= List of least concern arthropods =

- Extinct in the wild (EW): 2 species
- Critically endangered (CR): 850 species
- Endangered (EN): 1,531 species
- Vulnerable (VU): 1,574 species
- Near threatened (NT, LR/cd): 1,118 species
- Least concern (LC): 8,632 species
- Data deficient (DD): 4,643 species
Arthropod species (IUCN, 2025-2)
- 18431 extant species have been evaluated
- 13788 of those are fully assessed (Note: excludes data deficient evaluations.)
- 9750 are not threatened at present
- 4223 to 8866 are threatened (Note: Threatened comprises CR, EN and VU. Upper estimate additionally includes DD.)
- 83 to 261 are extinct or extinct in the wild:
  - 81 extinct (EX) species (Note: Chart omits extinct (EX) species)
  - 2 extinct in the wild (EW)
  - 171 possibly extinct [CR(PE)]
  - 1 possibly extinct in the wild [CR(PEW)]

In July 2016, the International Union for Conservation of Nature (IUCN) listed 4069 least concern arthropod species. Of all evaluated arthropod species, 43% are listed as least concern. The IUCN also lists 27 arthropod subspecies as least concern.

No subpopulations of arthropods have been evaluated by the IUCN.

This is a complete list of least concern arthropod species and subspecies as evaluated by the IUCN.

== Centipedes ==
- Mecistocephalus angusticeps

== Arachnids ==
There are 21 arachnid species assessed as least concern.

=== Spiders ===
- Argyrodes rostratus
- Fimbriated striated burrowing spider (Chilobrachys fimbriatus)
- Eastern Indian striated burrowing spider (Chilobrachys hardwicki)
- Cryptothele alluaudi
- Damastes validus
- Adanson's house jumper (Hasarius adansoni)
- Heliophanus activus
- Heteroonops tetraspinosus
- Microdipoena elsae
- Myrmarachne constricta
- Noideattella assumptia
- Pelicinus marmoratus
- Indian ornamental (Poecilotheria regalis)
- Pritha heikkii
- Rhacocnemis guttatus
- Selenops secretus

=== Schizomida ===
- Ovozomus similis

=== Pseudoscorpions ===
- Aldabrinus aldabrinus
- Feaella affinis
- Geogarypus ocellatus
- Oratemnus brevidigitatus

== Branchiopoda ==
- Giant fairy shrimp (Branchinecta gigas)

== Millipedes ==
- Doratogonus annulipes
- Doratogonus castaneus
- Doratogonus cristulatus
- Doratogonus falcatus
- Doratogonus flavifilis
- Doratogonus krausi
- Doratogonus levigatus
- Doratogonus montanus
- Doratogonus rugifrons
- Doratogonus xanthopus

== Malacostracans ==
Malacostraca includes crabs, lobsters, crayfish, shrimp, krill, woodlice, and many others. There are 1193 malacostracan species and 15 malacostracan subspecies assessed as least concern.

=== Isopods ===
- Thermosphaeroma subequalum

=== Decapods ===
There are 1191 decapod species and 15 decapod subspecies assessed as least concern.

==== Parastacids ====
- Orambato (Astacoides granulimanus)
- Astacopsis franklinii
- Astacopsis tricornis
- Cherax bicarinatus
- Smooth marron (Cherax cainii)
- Cusped crayfish (Cherax cuspidatus)
- Slender yabby (Cherax dispar)
- Koonac (Cherax preissii)
- Redclaw (Cherax quadricarinatus)
- Gilgies (Cherax quinquecarinatus)
- Cherax rhynchotus
- Engaeus cisternarius
- Engaeus cunicularius
- Engaeus cymus
- Engaeus fossor
- Engaeus fultoni
- Engaeus hemicirratulus
- Engaeus lengana
- Engaeus leptorhynchus
- Engaeus lyelli
- Engaeus mairener
- Engaeus merosetosus
- Engaeus orientalis
- Engaeus quadrimanus
- Engaeus sericatus
- Engaeus strictifrons
- Engaeus tayatea
- Engaeus tuberculatus
- Engaewa similis
- Engaewa subcoerulea
- Euastacus australasiensis
- Euastacus dangadi
- Gippsland spiny crayfish (Euastacus kershawi)
- Euastacus neohirsutus
- Euastacus reductus
- Euastacus spinifer
- Euastacus valentulus
- Euastacus yanga
- Geocharax tasmanicus
- Ombrastacoides brevirostris
- Ombrastacoides decemdentatus
- Ombrastacoides huonensis
- Ombrastacoides leptomerus
- Paranephrops planifrons
- Paranephrops zealandicus
- Parastacus pilimanus
- Spinastacoides catinipalmus
- Spinastacoides inermis
- Spinastacoides insignis

==== Gecarcinucids ====
- Adeleana chapmani
- Arachnothelphusa kadamaiana
- Arachnothelphusa rhadamanthysi
- Arachnothelphusa terrapes
- Austrothelphusa agassizi
- Austrothelphusa angustifrons
- Austrothelphusa raceki
- Austrothelphusa transversa
- Bakousa sarawakensis
- Balssiathelphusa cursor
- Barythelphusa cunicularis
- Barythelphusa guerini
- Barythelphusa jacquemontii
- Ceylonthelphusa rugosa
- Ceylonthelphusa sentosa
- Ceylonthelphusa soror
- Currothelphusa asserpes
- Cylindrothelphusa steniops
- Esanthelphusa chiangmai
- Esanthelphusa denchaii
- Esanthelphusa dugasti
- Esanthelphusa fangensis
- Esanthelphusa nimoafi
- Esanthelphusa phetchaburi
- Gecarcinucus jaquemontii
- Geelvinkia darnei
- Geithusa lentiginosa
- Heterothelphusa insolita
- Holthuisana alba
- Holthuisana biroi
- Holthuisana boesemani
- Holthuisana subconvexa
- Irmengardia pilosimana
- Lamella lamellifrons
- Mahatha adonis
- Mahatha ornatipes
- Maydelliathelphusa harpax
- Maydelliathelphusa lugubris
- Maydelliathelphusa masoniana
- Mekhongthelphusa brandti
- Niasathelphusa wirzi
- Oziothelphusa ceylonensis
- Oziothelphusa minneriyaensis
- Parathelphusa bogorensis
- Parathelphusa celebensis
- Parathelphusa ferruginea
- Parathelphusa lokaensis
- Parathelphusa maculata
- Parathelphusa malaysiana
- Parathelphusa manguao
- Parathelphusa oxygona
- Parathelphusa pallida
- Parathelphusa pareparensis
- Parathelphusa pulcherrima
- Parathelphusa rasilis
- Parathelphusa sorella
- Parathelphusa valida
- Perbrinckia scansor
- Perithelphusa borneensis
- Perithelphusa lehi
- Phricotelphusa amnicola
- Phricotelphusa deharvengi
- Panda crab (Phricotelphusa sirindhorn)
- Salangathelphusa brevicarinata
- Sartoriana blanfordi
- Sartoriana spinigera
- Sayamia bangkokensis
- Sayamia germaini
- Sayamia sexpunctata
- Siamthelphusa acutidens
- Siamthelphusa improvisa
- Siamthelphusa paviei
- Siamthelphusa retimanus
- Siamthelphusa transversa
- Siamthelphusa variegata
- Somanniathelphusa brevipodum
- Somanniathelphusa dangi
- Somanniathelphusa gaoyunensis
- Somanniathelphusa grayi
- Somanniathelphusa pax
- Somanniathelphusa plicatus
- Spiralothelphusa hydrodroma
- Sundathelphusa aspera
- Sundathelphusa boex
- Sundathelphusa cassiope
- Sundathelphusa cavernicola
- Sundathelphusa grapsoides
- Sundathelphusa hades
- Sundathelphusa tenebrosa
- Sundathelphusa urichi
- Sundathelphusa vedeniki
- Syntripsa flavichela
- Syntripsa matannensis
- Terrathelphusa kuhli
- Terrathelphusa loxophthalma
- Terrathelphusa ovis
- Thelphusula baramensis
- Thelphusula dicerophilus
- Thelphusula granosa
- Thelphusula hulu
- Thelphusula luidana
- Thelphusula sabana
- Thelphusula styx
- Thelphusula tawauensis
- Travancoriana convexa
- Travancoriana schirnerae

==== Atyids ====
Species

- Atya africana
- Atya crassa
- Atya dressleri
- Atya gabonensis
- Atya innocous
- Atya lanipes
- Atya margaritacea
- Atya scabra
- Atyaephyra acheronensis
- Atyaephyra desmarestii
- Atyaephyra orientalis
- Atyaephyra stankoi
- Atyaephyra thyamisensis
- Atyella brevirostris
- Atyoida pilipes
- Atyoida serrata
- Atyopsis moluccensis
- Atyopsis spinipes
- Australatya striolata
- Caridella cunningtoni
- Caridella minuta
- Caridella paski
- Caridina angulata
- Caridina appendiculata
- Caridina babaulti
- Caridina babaultioides
- Caridina bakoensis
- Caridina brachydactyla
- Caridina brevicarpalis
- Caridina bruneiana
- Caridina buehleri
- Caridina calmani
- Bee shrimp (Caridina cantonensis)
- Caridina celebensis
- Caridina chauhani
- Caridina chishuiensis
- Caridina cognata
- Caridina confusa
- Caridina demani
- Caridina disparidentata
- Caridina elongopoda
- Caridina endehensis
- Caridina evae
- Caridina excavatoides
- Caridina fernandoi
- Caridina fijiana
- Caridina fossarum
- Caridina gaesumi
- Caridina gracilipes
- Caridina gracilirostris
- Caridina gracillima
- Caridina grandirostris
- Caridina hova
- Caridina imitatrix
- Caridina indistincta
- Caridina isaloensis
- Caridina jalihali
- Caridina johnsoni
- Caridina kempi
- Caridina lanceifrons
- Caridina laoagensis
- Caridina leucosticta
- Caridina longirostris
- Caridina mahalona
- Caridina malayensis
- Caridina mccullochi
- Caridina medifolia
- Caridina mertoni
- Caridina moeri
- Caridina multidentata
- Caridina natalensis
- Caridina natarajani
- Caridina neglecta
- Caridina nilotica
- Caridina novaecaledoniae
- Caridina papuana
- Caridina pareparensis
- Caridina parvidentata
- Caridina peninsularis
- Caridina pingi
- Caridina prashadi
- Caridina pristis
- Caridina propinqua
- Caridina rapaensis
- Caridina rubella
- Caridina serratirostris
- Caridina shenoyi
- Caridina similis
- Caridina simoni
- Caridina spinula
- Caridina sulawesi
- Caridina sumatrensis
- Caridina temasek
- Caridina thambipillai
- Caridina togoensis
- Caridina typus
- Caridina villadolidi
- Caridina weberi
- Caridina xiphias
- Caridina yunnanensis
- Caridina zebra
- Caridina zeylanica
- Caridinides wilkinsi
- Caridinopsis chevalieri
- Jonga serrei
- Limnocaridina iridinae
- Limnocaridina latipes
- Limnocaridina parvula
- Limnocaridina retarius
- Limnocaridina similis
- Limnocaridina socius
- Limnocaridina spinipes
- Limnocaridina tanganyikae
- Micratya poeyi
- Neocaridina denticulata
- Neocaridina fukiensis
- Neocaridina gracilipoda
- Neocaridina hofendopoda
- Neocaridina iriomotensis
- Neocaridina ishigakiensis
- Neocaridina palmata
- Neocaridina spinosa
- Paracaridina guizhouensis
- Paratya australiensis
- Paratya boninensis
- Paratya bouvieri
- Paratya caledonica
- Paratya compressa
- Paratya curvirostris
- Paratya howensis
- Paratya improvisa
- Paratya intermedia
- Paratya typa
- Parisia gracilis
- Parisia unguis
- Potimirim brasiliana
- Potimirim glabra
- Potimirim potimirim
- Sinodina bispinosa
- Sinodina yui
- Troglocaris anophthalmus
- Typhlatya campecheae
- Typhlatya mitchelli
- Mona cave shrimp (Typhlatya monae)
- Typhlatya pearsei

Subspecies

- Caridina babaulti basrensis
- Caridina babaultioides babaultioides
- Caridina indistincta indistincta
- Caridina isaloensis grandidieri
- Caridina isaloensis isaloensis
- Neocaridina denticulata denticulata
- Neocaridina palmata meridionalis
- Neocaridina palmata palmata

==== Cambarids ====
Species and subspecies

- Bottlebrush crayfish (Barbicambarus cornutus)
- Angular dwarf crawfish (Cambarellus lesliei)
- Acocil (Cambarellus montezumae)
- Aransas dwarf crawfish (Cambarellus ninae)
- Cambarellus occidentalis
- Swamp dwarf crayfish (Cambarellus puer)
- Cajun dwarf crayfish (Cambarellus shufeldtii)
- Brazos dwarf crayfish (Cambarellus texanus)
- Cambarellus zempoalensis
- Thornytail crayfish (Cambarus acanthura)
- Acuminate crayfish (Cambarus acuminatus)
- Angled crayfish (Cambarus angularis)
- Mitten crayfish (Cambarus asperimanus)
- Appalachian brook crayfish (Cambarus bartonii)
- Bluegrass crayfish (Cambarus batchi)
- Longclaw crayfish (Cambarus buntingi)
- Rock crayfish (Cambarus carinirostris)
- Red burrowing crayfish (Cambarus carolinus)
- Boston Mountains crayfish (Cambarus causeyi)
- New river crayfish (Cambarus chasmodactylus)
- Chauga river crayfish (Cambarus chaugaensis)
- Coosa crayfish (Cambarus coosae)
- Hairyfoot crayfish (Cambarus crinipes)
- Apalachicola cave crayfish (Cambarus cryptodytes)
- Cumberland crayfish (Cambarus cumberlandensis)
- Carolina ladle crayfish (Cambarus davidi)
- Valley flame crayfish (Cambarus deweesae)
- Devil crawfish (Cambarus diogenes)
- Boxclaw crayfish (Cambarus distans)
- Upland burrowing crayfish (Cambarus dubius)
- Tallapoosa crayfish (Cambarus englishi)
- Cambarus friaufi
- Linear cobalt crayfish (Cambarus gentryi)
- Little Tennessee river crayfish (Cambarus georgiae)
- Tanback crayfish (Cambarus girardianus)
- Twospot crayfish (Cambarus graysoni)
- Slackwater crayfish (Cambarus halli)
- Prickly cave crayfish (Cambarus hamulatus)
- Hiwassee crayfish (Cambarus hiwasseensis)
- Rocky river crayfish (Cambarus hobbsorum)
- Chattahoochee crayfish (Cambarus howardi)
- Cambarus hubbsi
- Sandhills spiny crayfish (Cambarus hystricosus)
- Carolina foothills crayfish (Cambarus johni)
- Variable crayfish (Cambarus latimanus)
- Longnose crayfish (Cambarus longirostris)
- Atlantic slope crayfish (Cambarus longulus)
- Painted devil crayfish (Cambarus ludovicianus)
- Freckled crayfish (Cambarus maculatus)
- Greensaddle crayfish (Cambarus manningi)
- Rusty grave digger (Cambarus miltus)
- Monongahela crayfish (Cambarus monongalensis)
- Knotty burrowing crayfish (Cambarus nodosus)
- Sloped crayfish (Cambarus obstipus)
- Ortmann's mudbug (Cambarus ortmanni)
- Mountain midget crayfish (Cambarus parvoculus)
- Paintedhand mudbug (Cambarus polychromatus)
- French broad crayfish (Cambarus reburrus)
- Sickle crayfish (Cambarus reduncus)
- Pine savannah crayfish (Cambarus reflexus)
- Big water crayfish (Cambarus robustus)
- Depression crayfish (Cambarus rusticiformis)
- Teays river crayfish (Cambarus sciotensis)
- Chattooga river crayfish (Cambarus scotti)
- Triangleclaw crayfish (Cambarus sphenoides)
- Ambiguous crayfish (Cambarus striatus)
- Cavespring crayfish (Cambarus tenebrosus)
- Little brown mudbug (Cambarus thomai)
- Blackbarred crayfish (Cambarus unestami)
- Lavender burrowing crayfish (Fallicambarus byersi)
- Timberlands burrowing crayfish (Fallicambarus caesius)
- Texas prairie crayfish (Fallicambarus devastator)
- Digger crayfish (Fallicambarus fodiens)
- Houston burrowing crayfish (Fallicambarus houstonensis)
- Big thicket burrowing crayfish (Fallicambarus kountzeae)
- Old prairie digger (Fallicambarus macneesei)
- Saline burrowing crayfish (Fallicambarus strawni)
- Sabine fencing crayfish (Faxonella beyeri)
- Blair's fencing crayfish (Faxonella blairi)
- Ditch fencing crayfish (Faxonella clypeata)
- Prominence riverlet crayfish (Hobbseus prominens)
- Redspotted stream crayfish (Orconectes acares)
- Alabama crayfish (Orconectes alabamensis)
- Southern cave crayfish (Orconectes australis)
- Barren river crayfish (Orconectes barrenensis)
- North Carolina spiny crayfish (Orconectes carolinensis)
- Orconectes causeyi
- Chickasaw crayfish (Orconectes chickasawae)
- Slender crayfish (Orconectes compressus)
- Flint river crayfish (Orconectes cooperi)
- Spiny stream crayfish (Orconectes cristavarius)
- Conchas crayfish (Orconectes deanae)
- Painted crayfish (Orconectes difficilis)
- Saddle crayfish (Orconectes durelli)
- Reticulate crayfish (Orconectes erichsonianus)
- Ets crayfish (Orconectes etnieri)
- Surgeon crayfish (Orconectes forceps)
- Belted crayfish (Orconectes harrisonii)
- Teche painted crayfish (Orconectes hathawayi)

- Teche painted crayfish (Orconectes hathawayi hathawayi)

- Woodland crayfish (Orconectes hylas)
- Orconectes illinoiensis
- Calico crayfish (Orconectes immunis)
- Indiana crayfish (Orconectes indianensis)
- Ghost crayfish (Orconectes inermis)
- Kentucky river crayfish (Orconectes juvenilis)
- Kentucky crayfish (Orconectes kentuckiensis)
- Shrimp crayfish (Orconectes lancifer)
- Little river creek crayfish (Orconectes leptogonopodus)
- Spinycheek crayfish (Orconectes limosus)
- Longpincered crayfish (Orconectes longidigitus)
- Golden crayfish (Orconectes luteus)
- Neosho midget crayfish (Orconectes macrus)
- Saddlebacked crayfish (Orconectes medius)
- Meek's crayfish (Orconectes meeki)
- Mena crayfish (Orconectes menae)
- Wonderful crayfish (Orconectes mirus)
- Water nymph crayfish (Orconectes nais)
- Midget crayfish (Orconectes nana)
- Gapped ringed crayfish (Orconectes neglectus)
- Allegheny crayfish (Orconectes obscurus)
- Ozark crayfish (Orconectes ozarkae)
- Mottled crayfish (Orconectes pagei)
- Orconectes palmeri
- Mammoth cave crayfish (Orconectes pellucidus)
- Complete crayfish (Orconectes perfectus)
- Bigclaw crayfish (Orconectes placidus)
- Northern clearwater crayfish (Orconectes propinquus)
- Spothanded crayfish (Orconectes punctimanus)
- Phallic crayfish (Orconectes putnami)
- Rough river crayfish (Orconectes rafinesquei)
- Fishhook crayfish (Orconectes rhoadesi)
- Mild river crayfish (Orconectes ronaldi)
- Rusty crayfish (Orconectes rusticus)
- Sanborn's crayfish (Orconectes sanbornii)
- Sloan's crayfish (Orconectes sloanii)
- Coosa river spiny crayfish (Orconectes spinosus)
- Little Wabash crayfish (Orconectes stannardi)
- Caney mountain cave crayfish (Orconectes stygocaneyi)
- Western highland crayfish (Orconectes tricuspis)
- Powerful crayfish (Orconectes validus)
- Virile crayfish (Orconectes virilis)
- Williams crayfish (Orconectes williamsi)
- Hatchie river crayfish (Procambarus ablusus)
- Procambarus acanthophorus
- Procambarus achilli
- Sharpnose crayfish (Procambarus acutissimus)
- White river crayfish (Procambarus acutus)
- Vidalia crayfish (Procambarus advena)
- Blue crayfish (Procambarus alleni)
- Wandering crayfish (Procambarus barbatus)
- Ribbon crayfish (Procambarus bivittatus)
- Santee crayfish (Procambarus blandingii)
- Procambarus caballeroi
- Poor crayfish (Procambarus caritus)
- Blueclaw chimney crawfish (Procambarus ceruleus)
- Cedar creek crayfish (Procambarus chacei)
- Red swamp crayfish (Procambarus clarkii)
- Cockscomb crayfish (Procambarus clemmeri)
- Procambarus cuevachicae
- Red river burrowing crayfish (Procambarus curdi)
- Southwestern creek crayfish (Procambarus dupratzi)
- Edisto crayfish (Procambarus echinatus)
- Black mottled crayfish (Procambarus enoplosternum)
- Humpback crayfish (Procambarus epicyrtus)
- Deceitful crayfish (Procambarus fallax)
- Spiny-tail crayfish (Procambarus fitzpatricki)
- Twin crawfish (Procambarus geminus)
- Procambarus gonopodcristatus
- Prairie crayfish (Procambarus gracilis)
- Egyptian crayfish (Procambarus hagenianus)
- Straightedge crayfish (Procambarus hayi)
- Procambarus hidalgoensis
- Marsh crayfish (Procambarus hinei)
- Shaggy crayfish (Procambarus hirsutus)
- Procambarus hoffmani
- Ornate crayfish (Procambarus howellae)
- Jackknife crayfish (Procambarus hubbelli)
- Smoothnose crayfish (Procambarus hybus)
- Cut crayfish (Procambarus incilis)
- Javelin crayfish (Procambarus jaculus)
- Free state chimney crawfish (Procambarus kensleyi)
- Hatchet crayfish (Procambarus kilbyi)
- Mobile crayfish (Procambarus lecontei)
- Blacknose crayfish (Procambarus leonensis)
- Osage burrowing crayfish (Procambarus liberorum)
- Procambarus llamasi
- Mane crayfish (Procambarus lophotus)
- Vampire crayfish (Procambarus lucifugus)
- Lame crayfish (Procambarus mancus)
- Procambarus mexicanus
- Procambarus mirandai
- Red river crayfish (Procambarus natchitochae)
- Neches crayfish (Procambarus nechesae)
- Blackbelted crayfish (Procambarus nigrocinctus)
- Procambarus oaxacae
- Okaloosa crayfish (Procambarus okaloosae)
- Procambarus olmecorum
- Ouachita river crayfish (Procambarus ouachitae)
- Peninsula crayfish (Procambarus paeninsulanus)
- Bismark burrowing crayfish (Procambarus parasimulans)
- Procambarus pilosimanus
- Flatnose crayfish (Procambarus planirostris)
- Croatan crayfish (Procambarus plumimanus)
- Christmas tree crayfish (Procambarus pygmaeus)
- Procambarus riojae
- Seminole crayfish (Procambarus seminolae)
- Gulf crayfish (Procambarus shermani)
- Southern plains crayfish (Procambarus simulans)
- White tubercled crayfish (Procambarus spiculifer)
- Choctawhatchee crayfish (Procambarus suttkusi)
- Mole crayfish (Procambarus talpoides)
- Procambarus toltecae
- Eastern red swamp crayfish (Procambarus troglodytes)
- Procambarus truculentus
- Giant bearded crayfish (Procambarus tulanei)
- Grainy crayfish (Procambarus verrucosus)
- Sly crayfish (Procambarus versutus)
- Vernal crayfish (Procambarus viaeviridis)
- Percy's creek crayfish (Procambarus vioscai)

==== Potamonautids ====
- Erimetopus brazzae
- Foza raimundi
- Hydrothelphusa agilis
- Hydrothelphusa bombetokensis
- Hydrothelphusa goudoti
- Hydrothelphusa madagascariensis
- Hydrothelphusa vencesi
- Spiny river crab (Liberonautes chaperi)
- Common creek crab (Liberonautes latidactylus)
- Pale swamp crab (Liberonautes paludicolis)
- Madagapotamon humberti
- Malagasya antongilensis
- Platythelphusa armata
- Platythelphusa conculcata
- Platythelphusa denticulata
- Platythelphusa echinata
- Platythelphusa immaculata
- Platythelphusa maculata
- Platythelphusa polita
- Platythelphusa tuberculata
- Potamonautes alluaudi
- Potamonautes aloysiisabaudiae
- Anchieta's river crab (Potamonautes anchietae)
- Potamonautes antheus
- Potamonautes ballayi
- Potamonautes bayonianus
- Potamonautes berardi
- Brinck's river crab (Potamonautes brincki)
- Potamonautes calcaratus
- Bright river crab (Potamonautes clarus)
- Potamonautes choloensis
- Potamonautes congoensis
- Toothed river crab (Potamonautes dentatus)
- Flat river crab (Potamonautes depressus)
- Potamonautes dybowskii
- Ecorsse's river crab (Potamonautes ecorssei)
- Potamonautes emini
- Potamonautes granularis
- Potamonautes jeanneli
- Potamonautes johnstoni
- Potamonautes langi
- Potamonautes lirrangensis
- Potamonautes loashiensis
- Potamonautes loveni
- Potamonautes loveridgei
- Potamonautes margaritarius
- Potamonautes minor
- Potamonautes neumanni
- Potamonautes niloticus
- Potamonautes obesus
- Potamonautes odhneri
- Potamonautes paecilei
- Potamonautes parvicorpus
- Potamonautes parvispina
- Cape river crab (Potamonautes perlatus)
- Potamonautes perparvus
- Potamonautes platynotus
- Potamonautes rukwanzi
- Natal river crab (Potamonautes sidneyi)
- Potamonautes stanleyensis
- Potamonautes suprasulcatus
- Single-spined river crab (Potamonautes unispinus)
- Potamonautes walderi
- Warren's river crab (Potamonautes warreni)
- Potamonemus mambilorum
- Seychellum alluaudi
- African river crab (Sudanonautes africanus)
- Aubry's crab (Sudanonautes aubryi)
- Sudanonautes chavanesii
- Sudanonautes faradjensis
- Flower's crab (Sudanonautes floweri)
- Sudanonautes granulatus
- Kagoro stream crab (Sudanonautes kagoroensis)
- Monod's savanna crab (Sudanonautes monodi)

==== Pseudothelphusids ====
- Achlidon agrestis
- Chaceus caecus
- Chaceus pearsei
- Chaceus turikensis
- Epilobocera cubensis
- Epilobocera sinuatifrons
- Fredius beccarii
- Fredius chaffanjoni
- Fredius denticulatus
- Fredius estevisi
- Fredius fittkaui
- Fredius platyacanthus
- Fredius reflexifrons
- Fredius stenolobus
- Guinotia dentata
- Hypolobocera aequatorialis
- Hypolobocera beieri
- Hypolobocera bouvieri
- Hypolobocera chilensis
- Hypolobocera chocoensis
- Hypolobocera conradi
- Hypolobocera gorgonensis
- Hypolobocera lloroensis
- Hypolobocera martelathani
- Hypolobocera meineli
- Hypolobocera peruviana
- Kingsleya latifrons
- Kingsleya siolii
- Kingsleya ytupora
- Lindacatalina orientalis
- Moritschus henrici
- Neopseudothelphusa simoni
- Neostrengeria appressa
- Neostrengeria botti
- Neostrengeria boyacensis
- Neostrengeria charalensis
- Neostrengeria guenteri
- Neostrengeria lasallei
- Neostrengeria lindigiana
- Neostrengeria macropa
- Neostrengeria monterrodendoensis
- Neostrengeria niceforoi
- Neostrengeria tencalanensis
- Neostrengeria tonensis
- Odontothelphusa maxillipes
- Orthothelphusa holthuisi
- Orthothelphusa venezuelensis
- Phallangothelphusa dispar
- Phallangothelphusa magdalenensis
- Potamocarcinus armatus
- Potamocarcinus magnus
- Potamocarcinus nicaraguensis
- Potamocarcinus richmondi
- Prionothelphusa eliasi
- Pseudothelphusa americana
- Pseudothelphusa belliana
- Pseudothelphusa dilatata
- Pseudothelphusa jouyi
- Ptychophallus barbillaensis
- Ptychophallus colombianus
- Ptychophallus tumimanus
- Raddaus bocourti
- Raddaus orestrius
- Rodriguezus garmani
- Rodriguezus iturbei
- Rodriguezus ranchograndensis
- Strengeriana chaparralensis
- Strengeriana fuhrmanni
- Strengeriana maniformis
- Strengeriana restrepoi
- Strengeriana risaraldensis
- Strengeriana villaensis
- Typhlopseudothelphusa juberthiei
- Typhlopseudothelphusa mitchelli
- Zilchia aspoekorum
- Zilchia zilchi

==== Potamids ====
- Acanthopotamon martensi
- Alcomon lophocarpus
- Amamiku amamensis
- Aparapotamon grahami
- Bottapotamon fukienense
- Candidiopotamon kumejimense
- Candidiopotamon okinawense
- Rumsfeld stream crab (Candidiopotamon rathbunae)
- Cerberusa caeca
- Cerberusa tipula
- Chinapotamon depressum
- Daipotamon minos
- Demanietta huahin
- Demanietta khirikhan
- Demanietta lansak
- Demanietta nakhonsi
- Demanietta renongensis
- Demanietta suanphung
- Demanietta tritrungensis
- Donopotamon haii
- Eosamon boonyaratae
- Eosamon smithianum
- Erebusa calobates
- Huang Ze gray crab (Geothelphusa albogilva)
- Yuen Chak thick crab (Geothelphusa ancylophallus)
- Geothelphusa aramotoi
- Two-color crab (Geothelphusa bicolor)
- Blue-grey ze crab (Geothelphusa caesia)
- Sun Moon Lake ze crab (Geothelphusa candidiensis)
- Gray-taek crab (Geothelphusa cinerea)
- Geothelphusa dehaani
- Ze great crab (Geothelphusa dolichopodes)
- Geothelphusa exigua
- Geothelphusa fulva
- Geothelphusa grandiovata
- Geothelphusa hirsuta
- Geothelphusa iheya
- Geothelphusa kumejima
- Geothelphusa marginata
- Geothelphusa minei
- Chak Ko Shan crab (Geothelphusa monticola)
- Nan Xize crab (Geothelphusa nanhsi)
- Geothelphusa obtusipes
- Yellow-green crab (Geothelphusa olea)
- Geothelphusa sakomotoana
- Geothelphusa shokitai
- She crab (Geothelphusa tsayae)
- Hainanpotamon glabrum
- Hainanpotamon rubrum
- Himalayapotamon atkinsonianum
- Himalayapotamon emphyseteum
- Himalayapotamon koolooense
- Ibanum aethes
- Indochinamon bavi
- Indochinamon phongnha
- Isolapotamon anomalum
- Isolapotamon collinsi
- Isolapotamon consobrinum
- Isolapotamon griswoldi
- Isolapotamon ingeri
- Isolapotamon kinabaluense
- Isolapotamon nimboni
- Johora grallator
- Johora gua
- Johora hoiseni
- Johora intermedia
- Johora murphyi
- Johora tahanensis
- Johora thaiana
- Larnaudia chaiyaphumi
- Lobothelphusa woodmasoni
- Malayopotamon batak
- Malayopotamon brevimarginatum
- Mediapotamon leishanense
- Nanhaipotamon dongyinense
- Nanhaipotamon hongkongense
- Neilupotamon physalisum
- Neolarnaudia buesekomae
- Ovitamon artifrons
- Phaibulamon stilipes
- Potamiscus elaphrius
- Potamiscus tumidulum
- Potamon algeriense
- Potamon bilobatum
- Potamon gedrosianum
- Potamon hueceste
- Potamon magnum
- Potamon mesopotamicum
- Potamon persicum
- Potamon ruttneri
- Potamon strouhali
- Potamon transcaspicum
- Ryukyum yaeyamense
- Sinolapotamon patelifer
- Sinopotamon acutum
- Sinopotamon anyuanense
- Sinopotamon bilobatum
- Sinopotamon chekiangense
- Sinopotamon chishuiense
- Sinopotamon cladopodum
- Sinopotamon convexum
- Sinopotamon davidi
- Sinopotamon decrescentum
- Sinopotamon denticulatum
- Sinopotamon depressum
- Sinopotamon exiguum
- Sinopotamon honanese
- Sinopotamon huitongense
- Sinopotamon jiangkuoense
- Sinopotamon jianglenense
- Sinopotamon jichiense
- Sinopotamon jiujiangense
- Sinopotamon kwanhsienense
- Sinopotamon lansi
- Sinopotamon nanlingense
- Sinopotamon nanum
- Sinopotamon obliquum
- Sinopotamon planum
- Sinopotamon shensiense
- Sinopotamon styxum
- Sinopotamon teritisum
- Sinopotamon wanzaiense
- Sinopotamon xiangxiense
- Sinopotamon xingshanense
- Sinopotamon yaanense
- Sinopotamon yangtsekiense
- Socotra pseudocardisoma
- Socotrapotamon socotrensis
- Stelomon pruinosum
- Stoliczia ekavibhathai
- Stoliczia rafflesi
- Stoliczia stoliczkana
- Tenuilapotamon latilum
- Terrapotamon abbotti
- Terrapotamon palian
- Terrapotamon phaibuli
- Thaiphusa sirikit
- Thaipotamon chulabhorn
- Thaipotamon dansai
- Thaipotamon lomkao
- Tiwaripotamon annamense
- Trichopotamon sikkimensis

==== Palaemonids ====
Species

- Arachnochium mirabile
- Coutierella tonkinensis
- Creaseria morleyi
- Cryphiops caementarius
- Cryphiops perspicax
- Exopalaemon annandalei
- Exopalaemon modestus
- Leptocarpus fluminicola
- Leptocarpus potamiscus
- Leptopalaemon gagadjui
- Macrobrachium acanthurus
- Macrobrachium aemulum
- Macrobrachium ahkowi
- Macrobrachium altifrons
- Macrobrachium amazonicum
- Macrobrachium americanum
- Macrobrachium amplimanus
- Macrobrachium aracamuni
- Macrobrachium asperulum
- Macrobrachium assamense
- Macrobrachium auratum
- Macrobrachium australe
- Macrobrachium australiense
- Macrobrachium bariense
- Macrobrachium birmanicum
- Macrobrachium bombayense
- Macrobrachium borellii
- Macrobrachium brasiliense
- Macrobrachium bullatum
- Macrobrachium caledonicum
- Macrobrachium callirrhoe
- Macrobrachium carcinus
- Macrobrachium catonium
- Macrobrachium cavernicola
- Macrobrachium chevalieri
- Macrobrachium clymene
- Macrobrachium cortezi
- Macrobrachium crenulatum
- Macrobrachium dalatense
- Macrobrachium dayanum
- Macrobrachium depressimanum
- Macrobrachium dienbienphuense
- Macrobrachium digueti
- Macrobrachium dolichodactylus
- Macrobrachium duri
- Macrobrachium dux
- Macrobrachium empulipke
- Macrobrachium equidens
- Macrobrachium esculentum
- Macrobrachium faustinum
- Macrobrachium ferreirai
- Macrobrachium feunteuni
- Macrobrachium forcipatum
- Macrobrachium formosense
- Macrobrachium gallus
- Macrobrachium gangeticum
- Macrobrachium gracilirostre
- Macrobrachium grandimanus
- Macrobrachium hainanense
- Macrobrachium hancocki
- Macrobrachium handschini
- Macrobrachium hendersodayanum
- Macrobrachium hendersoni
- Macrobrachium heterochirus
- Macrobrachium hirsutimanus
- Macrobrachium hobbsi
- Macrobrachium horstii
- Macrobrachium idae
- Macrobrachium idella
- Macrobrachium iheringi
- Macrobrachium indicum
- Macrobrachium inpa
- Macrobrachium japonicum
- Macrobrachium jaroense
- Macrobrachium jelskii
- Macrobrachium kelianense
- Macrobrachium kistnense
- Macrobrachium koombooloomba
- Macrobrachium lamarrei
- Macrobrachium lanatum
- Macrobrachium lanceifrons
- Macrobrachium lanchesteri
- Macrobrachium lar
- Macrobrachium latidactylus
- Macrobrachium latimanus
- Macrobrachium lepidactyloides
- Macrobrachium lepidactylus
- Macrobrachium leucodactylus
- Macrobrachium lopopodus
- Macrobrachium lorentzi
- Macrobrachium lucifugum
- Macrobrachium macrobrachion
- Macrobrachium maculatum
- Macrobrachium malayanum
- Macrobrachium malcolmsonii
- Macrobrachium mammillodactylus
- Macrobrachium manningi
- Macrobrachium mazatecum
- Macrobrachium michoacanus
- Macrobrachium microps
- Macrobrachium mieni
- Macrobrachium moorei
- Macrobrachium nattereri
- Macrobrachium natulorum
- Macrobrachium neglectum
- Macrobrachium niloticum
- Macrobrachium niphanae
- Macrobrachium nipponense
- Macrobrachium nobilii
- Macrobrachium novaehollandiae
- Macrobrachium ohione
- Macrobrachium olfersii
- Macrobrachium panamense
- Macrobrachium patheinense
- Macrobrachium patsa
- Macrobrachium peguense
- Macrobrachium petersii
- Macrobrachium pilimanus
- Macrobrachium placidulum
- Macrobrachium placidum
- Macrobrachium platycheles
- Macrobrachium platyrostris
- Macrobrachium potiuna
- Macrobrachium rathbunae
- Macrobrachium reyesi
- Macrobrachium rhodochir
- Macrobrachium rodriguezi
- Giant river prawn (Macrobrachium rosenbergii)
- Macrobrachium rude
- Macrobrachium sabanus
- Macrobrachium saigonense
- Macrobrachium sankollii
- Macrobrachium sbordonii
- Macrobrachium scabriculum
- Macrobrachium shokitai
- Macrobrachium sintangense
- Macrobrachium sirindhorn
- Macrobrachium siwalikense
- Macrobrachium sollaudii
- Macrobrachium spinipes
- Macrobrachium spinosum
- Macrobrachium sulcatus
- Macrobrachium sundaicum
- Macrobrachium suongae
- Macrobrachium superbum
- Macrobrachium surinamicum
- Macrobrachium tenellum
- Macrobrachium thai
- Macrobrachium tiwarii
- Macrobrachium tolmerum
- Macrobrachium totonacum
- Macrobrachium tratense
- Macrobrachium urayang
- Macrobrachium venustum
- Macrobrachium vicconi
- Macrobrachium villalobosi
- Macrobrachium villosimanus
- Macrobrachium vollenhoveni
- Macrobrachium weberi
- Macrobrachium yui
- Palaemon capensis
- Palaemonetes antennarius
- Palaemonetes argentinus
- Palaemonetes australis
- Palaemonetes carteri
- Palaemonetes hobbsi
- Palaemonetes ivonicus
- Palaemonetes kadiakensis
- Palaemonetes mercedae
- Palaemonetes paludosus
- Palaemonetes sinensis
- Pseudopalaemon amazonensis
- Pseudopalaemon bouvieri
- Pseudopalaemon chryseus
- Pseudopalaemon gouldingi
- Pseudopalaemon nigramnis

Subspecies

- Macrobrachium altifrons altifrons
- Macrobrachium assamense assamense
- Macrobrachium idella georgii
- Macrobrachium idella idella
- Macrobrachium lamarrei lamarrei
- Macrobrachium malcolmsonii malcolmsonii

==== Trichodactylids ====
- Avotrichodactylus constrictus
- Bottiella niceforei
- Dilocarcinus pagei
- Dilocarcinus septemdentatus
- Forsteria venezuelensis
- Fredilocarcinus musmuschiae
- Goyazana castelnaui
- Goyazana rotundicauda
- Moreirocarcinus chacei
- Moreirocarcinus emarginatus
- Moreirocarcinus laevifrons
- Poppiana argentiniana
- Poppiana bulbifer
- Poppiana dentata
- Rotundovaldivia latidens
- Sylviocarcinus australis
- Sylviocarcinus devillei
- Sylviocarcinus maldonadoensis
- Sylviocarcinus pictus
- Sylviocarcinus piriformis
- Trichodactylus borellianus
- Trichodactylus dentatus
- Trichodactylus ehrhardti
- Trichodactylus faxoni
- Trichodactylus fluviatilis
- Trichodactylus kensleyi
- Trichodactylus panoplus
- Trichodactylus petropolitanus
- Trichodactylus quinquedentatus
- Valdivia camerani
- Valdivia cururuensis
- Valdivia novemdentata
- Valdivia serrata
- Zilchiopsis collastinensis
- Zilchiopsis oronensis

==== Spiny lobsters ====
- Southern rock lobster (Jasus edwardsii)
- Cape rock lobster (Jasus lalandii)
- Tristan rock lobster (Jasus tristani)
- African spear lobster (Linuparus somniosus)
- Oriental spear lobster (Linuparus sordidus)
- Japanese spear lobster (Linuparus trigonus)
- Japanese furrow lobster (Nupalirus japonicus)
- Caribbean furry lobster (Palinurellus gundlachi)
- Indo-pacific furry lobster (Palinurellus wieneckii)
- Natal spiny lobster (Palinurus delagoae)
- Southern spiny lobster (Palinurus gilchristi)
- Pink spiny lobster (Palinurus mauritanicus)
- American blunthorn lobster (Palinustus truncatus)
- Unicorn blunthorn lobster (Palinustus unicornutus)
- Japanese blunthorn lobster (Palinustus waguensis)
- Australian spiny lobster (Panulirus cygnus)
- Brown spiny lobster (Panulirus echinatus)
- White-whiskered coral crayfish (Panulirus femoristriga)
- Spotted spiny lobster (Panulirus guttatus)
- Scalloped spiny lobster (Panulirus homarus)
- Blue spiny lobster (Panulirus inflatus)
- California spiny lobster (Panulirus interruptus)
- Longlegged spiny lobster (Panulirus longipes)
- Ornate spiny lobster (Panulirus ornatus)
- Pronghorn spiny lobster (Panulirus penicillatus)
- Mud spiny lobster (Panulirus polyphagus)
- Painted spiny lobster (Panulirus versicolor)
- Chilean jagged lobster (Projasus bahamondei)
- Cape jagged lobster (Projasus parkeri)
- Banded whip lobster (Puerulus angulatus)
- Arabian whip lobster (Puerulus sewelli)
- Velvet whip lobster (Puerulus velutinus)
- Green rock lobster (Sagmariasus verreauxi)

==== Lobsters ====
- Atlantic deep-sea lobster (Acanthacaris caeca)
- Prickly deep-sea lobster (Acanthacaris tenuimana)
- Sculptured lobster (Eunephrops cadenasi)
- American lobster (Homarus americanus)
- European lobster (Homarus gammarus)
- Andaman lobster (Metanephrops andamanicus)
- Northwest lobster (Metanephrops australiensis)
- Caribbean lobster (Metanephrops binghami)
- Bight lobster (Metanephrops boschmai)
- New Zealand lobster (Metanephrops challengeri)
- African lobster (Metanephrops mozambicus)
- Neptune lobster (Metanephrops neptunus)
- Siboga lobster (Metanephrops sibogae)
- China lobster (Metanephrops sinensis)
- Velvet lobster (Metanephrops velutinus)
- Norway lobster (Nephrops norvegicus)
- Spinetail lobsterette (Nephropsis acanthura)
- Florida lobsterette (Nephropsis aculeata)
- Prickly lobsterette (Nephropsis agassizii)
- Scarlet lobsterette (Nephropsis atlantica)
- Ridge-back lobsterette (Nephropsis carpenteri)
- Gladiator lobsterette (Nephropsis ensirostris)
- Ruby lobsterette (Nephropsis neglecta)
- Pacific lobsterette (Nephropsis occidentalis)
- Two-toned lobsterette (Nephropsis rosea)
- Indian Ocean lobsterette (Nephropsis stewarti)
- Red and white lobsterette (Nephropsis suhmi)
- Grooved lobsterette (Nephropsis sulcata)
- Thaumastocheles dochmiodon
- Pacific pincer lobster (Thaumastocheles japonicus)
- Atlantic pincer lobster (Thaumastocheles zaleucus)
- Bellator lobster (Thymopides grobovi)
- Patagonian lobsterette (Thymops birsteini)
- Nilenta lobsterette (Thymopsis nilenta)

==== Slipper lobsters ====
- Acantharctus ornatus
- Antarctus mawsoni
- Antipodarctus aoteanus
- Rough Spanish lobster (Arctides antipodarum)
- Small Spanish lobster (Arctides guineensis)
- Royal Spanish lobster (Arctides regalis)
- Bathyarctus chani
- Faxon slipper lobster (Bathyarctus faxoni)
- Bathyarctus rubens
- Biarctus pumilus
- Pygmy slipper lobster (Biarctus sordidus)
- Fiji locust lobster (Biarctus vitiensis)
- Locust lobster (Chelarctus aureus)
- Chelarctus cultrifer
- Crenarctus bicuspidatus
- Crenarctus crenatus
- Eduarctus aesopius
- Striated locust lobster (Eduarctus martensii)
- Eduarctus modestus
- Eduarctus pyrrhonotus
- Eduarctus reticulatus
- Shield fan lobster (Evibacus princeps)
- Galearctus aurora
- Galearctus avulsus
- Galearctus kitanoviriosus
- Galearctus timidus
- Gibbularctus gibberosus
- Velvet fan lobster (Ibacus alticrenatus)
- Serrate fan lobster (Ibacus brevipes)
- Glabrous fan lobster (Ibacus brucei)
- Ibacus chacei
- Smooth fan lobster (Ibacus novemdentatus)
- Butterfly fan lobster (Ibacus peronii)
- Sculptured mitten lobster (Parribacus antarcticus)
- Caledonian mitten lobster (Parribacus caledonicus)
- Blue-back locust lobster (Petrarctus brevicornis)
- Petrarctus demani
- Petrarctus holthuisi
- Hunchback locust lobster (Petrarctus rugosus)
- Petrarctus veliger
- Two-spot locust lobster (Remiarctus bertholdii)
- Soft locust lobster (Scammarctus batei)
- Spanish slipper lobster (Scyllarides aequinoctialis)
- Brazilian slipper lobster (Scyllarides brasiliensis)
- Hooded slipper lobster (Scyllarides deceptor)
- Cape slipper lobster (Scyllarides elisabethae)
- Aesop slipper lobster (Scyllarides haanii)
- Ridged slipper lobster (Scyllarides nodifer)
- Blunt slipper lobster (Scyllarides squammosus)
- Clamkiller slipper lobster (Scyllarides tridacnophaga)
- Scyllarus americanus
- Small European locust lobster (Scyllarus arctus)
- Scyllarus caparti
- Scyllarus chacei
- Scyllarus depressus
- Pygmy locust lobster (Scyllarus pygmaeus)
- Flathead lobster (Thenus orientalis)

==== Polychelids ====
- Cardus crucifer
- Homeryon asper
- Pentacheles gibbus
- Pentacheles laevis
- Pentacheles obscurus
- Pentacheles snyderi
- Pentacheles validus
- Polycheles amemiyai
- Polycheles baccatus
- Polycheles coccifer
- Polycheles enthrix
- Polycheles kermadecensis
- Polycheles martini
- Polycheles perarmatus
- Polycheles tanneri
- Polycheles typhlops
- Stereomastis aculeata
- Stereomastis auriculata
- Stereomastis cerata
- Stereomastis evexa
- Stereomastis galil
- Stereomastis helleri
- Stereomastis nana
- Stereomastis pacifica
- Stereomastis panglao
- Pink blind lobster (Stereomastis phosphorus)
- Stereomastis polita
- Flatback lobster (Stereomastis sculpta)
- Stereomastis suhmi
- Stereomastis surda
- Stereomastis talismani
- Stereomastis trispinosa
- Willemoesia forceps
- Willemoesia leptodactyla

==== Other decapod species ====
- Danube crayfish (Astacus leptodactylus)
- Stone crayfish (Austropotamobius torrentium
- Desmocaris trispinosa
- Flaming reef lobster (Enoplometopus antillensis)
- Hawaiian red lobster (Enoplometopus occidentalis)
- Euryrhynchus amazoniensis
- Euryrhynchus burchelli
- Euryrhynchus pemoni
- Euryrhynchus wrzesniowskii
- Pilose crayfish (Pacifastacus gambelii)
- Signal crayfish (Pacifastacus leniusculus)
- Potamalpheops monodi
- Potamalpheops stygicola
- Xiphocaris elongata

=== Krill species ===
- Antarctic krill (Euphausia superba)

== Insects ==
There are 2843 insect species and 12 insect subspecies assessed as least concern.

=== Earwigs ===
- Spirolabia browni

=== Blattodea ===
- Desmosia alluaudi
- Distichopis stylopyga
- Miriamrothschildia gardineri
- Miriamrothschildia labrynthica
- Parasigmoidella reticulata
- Sliferia acuticerca
- Sliferia depressiceps
- Sliferia lineaticollis

=== Phasmatodea species ===
- Alluaud's stick insect (Carausius alluaudi)
- Gardiner's stick insect (Carausius gardineri)
- Seychelles stick insect (Carausius sechellensis)
- Seychelles leaf insect (Phyllium bioculatum)

=== Termites ===
- Nasutitermes maheensis
- Neotermes laticollis

=== Orthoptera ===
There are 184 species and six subspecies in the order Orthoptera assessed as least concern.

==== Crickets ====
- Metioche perpusilla
- Cyprian stripe-headed cricket (Modicogryllus cyprius)
- Cretan glandular cricket (Ovaliptila lindbergi)
- Epirus glandular cricket (Ovaliptila newmanae)
- Polionemobius modestus
- Zarceomorpha abdita
- Zarceus fallaciosus

==== Acridids ====
- Slender burrowing grasshopper (Acrotylus patruelis)
- Tenerife rock grasshopper (Arminda brunneri)
- Gran Canaria rock grasshopper (Arminda burri)
- Fuerteventura rock grasshopper (Arminda fuerteventurae)
- Lanzarote rock grasshopper (Arminda lancerottensis)
- Gomera rock grasshopper (Arminda latifrons)
- Palma rock grasshopper (Arminda palmae)
- East African sword grasshopper (Brachycrotaphus sjostedti)
- Canarian pincer grasshopper (Calliptamus plebeius)
- Tabora grasshopper (Catantops tanganus)
- Cretan grasshopper (Chorthippus biroi)
- Common field grasshopper (Chorthippus brunneus)
- Piedmont grasshopper (Chorthippus cialancensis)
- Morea grasshopper (Chorthippus moreanus)
- Cephalonia grasshopper (Chorthippus sangiorgii)
- Willemse's grasshopper (Chorthippus willemsei)
- East African forest grasshopper (Coenona brevipedalis)
- Eastern Arc forest grasshopper (Heteracris coerulipes)
- Baccetti's apennine grasshopper (Italopodisma baccettii)
- Costa's apennine grasshopper (Italopodisma costae)
- Reatine apennine grasshopper (Italopodisma ebneri)
- Canarian band-winged grasshopper (Oedipoda canariensis)
- Cretan band-winged grasshopper (Oedipoda venusta)
- Purpurarian grasshopper (Omocestus simonyi)
- Cyprian maquis grasshopper (Pezotettix cypria)
- Rhodes maquis grasshopper (Pezotettix lagoi)
- Fuerteventura sand grasshopper (Sphingonotus fuerteventurae)
- Lanzarote sand grasshopper (Sphingonotus pachecoi)
- Red sand grasshopper (Sphingonotus sublaevis)
- Cañadas sand grasshopper (Sphingonotus willemsei)
- Apennine toothed grasshopper (Stenobothrus apenninus)

==== Tettigoniids ====
Species

- Armoured katydid (Acanthoplus discoidalis)
- Long-legged armoured katydid (Acanthoplus longipes)
- Speiser's armoured katydid (Acanthoplus speiseri)
- Antlered thorny katydid (Acanthoproctus cervinus)
- Skeleton coast thorny katydid (Acanthoproctus diadematus)
- Striped thorny katydid (Acanthoproctus vittatus)
- Limpopo false shieldback (Acilacris obovatus)
- Alfred's shieldback (Alfredectes semiaeneus)
- Farrell's delicate katydid (Amyttacta farrelli)
- Rentz's false shieldback (Aroegas rentzi)
- East coast flat-necked shieldback (Arytropteris granulithorax)
- Wood-louse glandular bush-cricket (Bradyporus oniscus)
- Common ceresia (Ceresia pulchripes)
- Eastern black-winged clonia (Clonia assimilis)
- Namibian clonia (Clonia caudata)
- Kalahari clonia (Clonia kalahariensis)
- Giant black-winged clonia (Clonia melanoptera)
- Small wavy clonia (Clonia minuta)
- Saussure's black-winged clonia (Clonia saussurei)
- Yellow-winged clonia (Clonia tessellata)
- Van Son's wavy clonia (Clonia vansoni)
- Common wavy clonia (Clonia vittata)
- Wahlberg's clonia (Clonia wahlbergi)
- Long-tailed meadow katydid (Conocephalus caudalis)
- African cone-head (Conocephalus conocephalus)
- Yellowtail meadow katydid (Conocephalus iris)
- Elongate meadow katydid (Conocephalus longiceps)
- Spotted meadow katydid (Conocephalus maculatus)
- Common restio katydid (Conocephalus montana)
- Northern armoured katydid (Enyaliopsis transvaalensis)
- Epirus marbled bush-cricket (Eupholidoptera epirotica)
- Cyclades marbled bush-cricket (Eupholidoptera kykladica)
- Greek marbled bush-cricket (Eupholidoptera megastyla)
- Short-winged spiny bush-cricket (Gampsocleis abbreviata)
- Steppe spiny bush-cricket (Gampsocleis glabra)
- Bachmann's armoured katydid (Hemihetrodes bachmanni)
- Koringkriek (Hetrodes pupus)
- Southern black-faced katydid (Lanista annulicornis)
- Olympus meadow bush-cricket (Metrioptera tsirojanni)
- Ebner's modest bush-cricket (Modestana ebneri)
- Peringuey's ambush katydid (Peringueyella jocosa)
- Spear reed katydid (Pseudorhynchus hastifer)
- Sub-saharan reed katydid (Pseudorhynchus pungens)
- Toothless bush-cricket (Rhacocleis edentata)
- Greek bush-cricket (Rhacocleis graeca)
- Cyclades bush-cricket (Rhacocleis insularis)
- Robust conehead katydid (Ruspolia ampla)
- Greek predatory bush-cricket (Saga hellenica)
- Two-colored seedpod shieldback (Thoracistus viridifer)
- Zulu shieldback (Zuludectes modestus)

Subspecies

- Clonia wahlbergi wahlbergi
- Lesser reed katydid (Pseudorhynchus pungens meridionalis)

==== Rhaphidophorids ====
- Naoussa cave-cricket (Dolichopoda hussoni)
- Aghias Andreas cave-cricket (Dolichopoda lustriae)
- Makrykapa cave-cricket (Dolichopoda makrykapa)
- Palpate cave cricket (Dolichopoda palpata)
- Petalas cave-cricket (Dolichopoda patrizii)
- Remy's cave-cricket (Dolichopoda remyi)
- Katafygi cave-cricket (Dolichopoda unicolor)
- Orchomenos cave-cricket (Dolichopoda vandeli)
- Common cave-cricket (Troglophilus cavicola)
- Lago's cave-cricket (Troglophilus lagoi)
- Spiny cave-cricket (Troglophilus spinulosus)

==== Phaneropterids ====
Species

- Elegant sylvan katydid (Acauloplax exigua)
- Cretan long-legged bush-cricket (Acrometopa cretensis)
- African mecopod (Anoedopoda lamellata)
- Namibian black-kneed katydid (Aprosphylus hybridus)
- Olszanowski's black-kneed katydid (Aprosphylus olszanowskii)
- Giant leaf katydid (Arantia fasciata)
- Cape flightless katydid (Austrodontura capensis)
- Wilson's winter katydid (Brinckiella wilsoni)
- Slender leaf katydid (Catoptropteryx aurita)
- Corymeta (Corymeta amplectens)
- Common bark katydid (Cymatomera denticollis)
- Greater bark katydid (Cymatomerella spilophora)
- Angolan ducetia (Ducetia sagitta)
- Long-legged leaf katydid (Eulioptera flexilima)
- Reticulated leaf katydid (Eulioptera reticulata)
- Spined katydid (Eulioptera spinulosa)
- Kalahari oblong-eyed katydid (Eurycorypha cereris)
- Lesne's oblong-eyed katydid (Eurycorypha lesnei)
- African oblong-eyed katydid (Eurycorypha meruensis)
- Eastern oblong-eyed katydid (Eurycorypha proserpinae)
- Cape agile katydid (Griffiniana capensis)
- Long-winged agile katydid (Griffiniana longipes)
- Dimorphic leaf katydid (Horatosphaga serrifera)
- Namibian dimorphic leaf katydid (Horatosphaga stylifera)
- Andreeva's plump bush-cricket (Isophya andreevae)
- Bures' plump bush-cricket (Isophya bureschi)
- Durmitor plump bush-cricket (Isophya clara)
- Limnos plump bush-cricket (Isophya lemnotica)
- Miksic's plump bush-cricket (Isophya miksici)
- Blunt plump bush-cricket (Isophya obtusa)
- Plevne plump bush-cricket (Isophya plevnensis)
- Rhodope plump bush-cricket (Isophya rhodopensis)
- Showy plump bush-cricket (Isophya speciosa)
- Thrace plump bush-cricket (Isophya thracica)
- Tosevsk's plump bush-cricket (Isophya tosevski)
- Brunner's melidia (Melidia brunneri)
- Greek ornate bush-cricket (Metaplastes oertzeni)
- Balkan ornate bush-cricket (Metaplastes ornatus)
- Flap-eared leaf katydid (Oxyecous lesnei)
- Pelerinus rostratus
- Arabian sickle bush-cricket (Phaneroptera sparsa)
- Black-spotted plangia (Plangia compressa)
- Krompokkel (Plangia graminea)
- Aegean bright bush-cricket (Poecilimon aegaeus)
- Balkan bright bush-cricket (Poecilimon affinis)
- Lost bright bush-cricket (Poecilimon amissus)
- Enlarged bright bush-cricket (Poecilimon ampliatus)
- Pelopponesian bright bush-cricket (Poecilimon artedentatus)
- Cretan bright bush-cricket (Poecilimon cretensis)
- Dodecanese bright bush-cricket (Poecilimon deplanatus)
- Ebner's bright bush-cricket (Poecilimon ebneri)
- Ege bright bush-cricket (Poecilimon ege)
- Erimanthos bright bush-cricket (Poecilimon erimanthos)
- Gerlind's bright bush-cricket (Poecilimon gerlindae)
- Slender bright bush-cricket (Poecilimon gracilis)
- Hooked bright bush-cricket (Poecilimon hamatus)
- Heroic bright bush-cricket (Poecilimon heroicus)
- Macedonian bright bush-cricket (Poecilimon hoelzeli)
- Marianne's bright bush-cricket (Poecilimon mariannae)
- Noble bright bush-cricket (Poecilimon nobilis)
- Obese bright bush-cricket (Poecilimon obesus)
- Orbelicos bright bush-cricket (Poecilimon orbelicus)
- Similar bright bush-cricket (Poecilimon propinquus)
- Saint-paul's bright bush-cricket (Poecilimon sanctipauli)
- Poecilimon thessalicus
- Single-spined bright bush-cricket (Poecilimon unispinosus)
- Veluchi bright bush-cricket (Poecilimon veluchianus)
- Werner's bright bush-cricket (Poecilimon werneri)
- Zimmer's bright bush-cricket (Poecilimon zimmeri)
- Kalahari dimorphic leaf katydid (Prosphaga calaharica)
- Lace-winged katydid (Pseudosaga maculata)
- Acacia katydid (Terpnistria lobulata)
- Zebra katydid (Terpnistria zebrata)
- Striped grass katydid (Tylopsis bilineolata)
- Common grass katydid (Tylopsis continua)
- Elongate grass katydid (Tylopsis rubrescens)
- Blue-legged sylvan katydid (Zabalius ophthalmicus)
- Tsitsikamma katydid (Zitsikama tessellata)

Subspecies

- Eulioptera reticulata leptomorpha
- Eulioptera reticulata reticulata
- Isophya longicaudata adamovici
- Isophya rhodopensis leonorae

==== Other Orthoptera species ====
- African sandhopper (Afrotridactylus usambaricus)
- Seychelles monkey grasshopper (Euschmidtia cruciformis)
- Swahili monkey grasshopper (Euschmidtia sansibarica)
- Krimbas' mole-cricket (Gryllotalpa krimbasi)
- Niphetogryllacris fryeri
- Prosopogryllacris sechellensis
- Cyprian stick grasshopper (Pyrgomorpha cypria)

=== Hymenoptera ===
There are 106 species in the order Hymenoptera assessed as least concern.

==== Ants ====
- Temnothorax recedens

==== Colletids ====
- Colletes hederae
- Colletes pannonicus
- Colletes schmidi
- Colletes tuberculiger
- Hylaeus ater

==== Melittids ====
- Dasypoda morotei
- Dasypoda pyriformis
- Macropis europaea

==== Apids ====
- Amegilla canifrons
- Anthophora alluaudi
- White shouldered bumble bee (Bombus appositus)
- Black and gold bumble bee (Bombus auricomus)
- Bombus baeri
- Two form bumble bee (Bombus bifarius)
- Two-spotted bumble bee (Bombus bimaculatus)
- Northern amber bumble bee (Bombus borealis)
- Central bumble bee (Bombus centralis)
- Lemon cuckoo bumblebee (Bombus citrinus)
- Bombus coccineus
- Bombus ephippiatus
- Yellowhead bumblebee (Bombus flavifrons)
- Frigid bumblebee (Bombus frigidus)
- Bombus funebris
- Brown-belted bumblebee (Bombus griseocollis)
- Bombus handlirschi
- Hunt bumble bee (Bombus huntii)
- Common eastern bumblebee (Bombus impatiens)
- Indiscriminate cuckoo bumble bee (Bombus insularis)
- Bombus lapponicus
- Bombus macgregori
- Bombus magnus
- Black-tailed bumblebee (Bombus melanopygus)
- Fuzzy-horned bumble bee (Bombus mixtus)
- Bombus morio
- Nevada bumble bee (Bombus nevadensis)
- Bombus opifex
- Bombus pauloensis (= Bombus atratus)
- Bombus perezi
- Bombus pereziellus
- Confusing bumblebee (Bombus perplexus)
- Bombus pyrenaeus
- Red-belted bumble bee (Bombus rufocinctus)
- Sanderson bumble bee (Bombus sandersoni)
- Sitka bumblebee (Bombus sitkensis)
- Forest bumble bee (Bombus sylvicola)
- Bombus ternarius
- Bombus transversalis
- Bombus trinominatus
- Half-black bumblebee (Bombus vagans)
- Van Dyke bumble bee (Bombus vandykei)
- Yellow-faced bumblebee (Bombus vosnesenskii)
- Bombus weisi
- Ceratina gravidula
- Epeolus alpinus
- Epeolus fallax
- Nomada atroscutellaris
- Nomada bluethgeni
- Nomada concolor
- Nomada coronata
- Nomada discedens
- Nomada fabriciana
- Nomada ferruginata
- Nomada flava
- Nomada fusca
- Nomada hirtipes
- Nomada melathoracica
- Nomada merceti
- Nomada piccioliana
- Nomada priesneri
- Nomada signata
- Nomada similis

==== Halictids ====
- Dufourea alpina
- Halictus concinnus
- Halictus frontalis
- Halictus langobardicus
- Lasioglossum alpigenum
- Lasioglossum arctifrons
- Lasioglossum bavaricum
- Lasioglossum chalcodes
- Lasioglossum laetum
- Lasioglossum viride
- Lasioglossum wollastoni

==== Andrenids ====
- Andrena anthrisci
- Andrena concinna
- Andrena leucolippa
- Andrena maderensis
- Andrena nuptialis
- Andrena rogenhoferi
- Andrena strohmella
- Andrena wollastoni
- Flavipanurgus flavus
- Flavipanurgus ibericus
- Flavipanurgus venustus
- Panurgus canescens
- Panurgus dentipes
- Panurgus meridionalis

==== Megachilids ====
- Hoplitis lepeletieri
- Hoplitis loti
- Hoplitis ochraceicornis
- Hoplitis ravouxi
- Hoplitis villosa
- Megachile lagopoda
- Megachile parietina
- Osmia alticola
- Osmia pilicornis

=== Mantises ===
- Wingless mantis (Apteromantis aptera)
- Devil's flower mantis (Blepharopsis mendica)
- Sublime conehead mantis (Hypsicorypha gracilis)
- European mantis (Mantis religiosa)
- Seychelles mantis (Polyspilota seychelliana)

=== Lepidoptera ===
Lepidoptera comprises moths and butterflies. There are 420 species and one subspecies in the order Lepidoptera assessed as least concern.

==== Swallowtail butterflies ====
- Chinese three-tailed swallowtail (Bhutanitis thaidina)
- Yellow zebra (Graphium deucalion)
- Tabitha's swordtail (Graphium dorcus)
- Meyer's triangle (Graphium meyeri)
- Dancing swallowtail (Graphium polistratus)
- Tabora white lady (Graphium taboranus)
- Paradise birdwing (Ornithoptera paradisea)
- Papilio acheron
- Common white-banded swallowtail (Papilio cyproeofila)
- White-banded swallowtail (Papilio echerioides)
- Corsican swallowtail (Papilio hospiton)
- Papilio toboroi
- Papilio weymeri
- Cretan festoon (Zerynthia cretica)

==== Lycaenids ====
- Braine's zulu (Alaena brainei)
- Barkly's copper (Aloeides barklyi)
- Red Hill copper (Aloeides egerides)
- Nolloth's copper (Aloeides nollothi)
- Acacia blue (Amblypodia vivarna)
- Ancema anysis
- Ancema ctesia
- Arnold's ciliate blue (Anthene arnoldi)
- Red forewing (Anthene fulvus)
- Anomalous ciliate blue (Anthene juba)
- Kersten's ciliate blue (Anthene kersteni)
- Large red spot ciliate blue (Anthene lusones)
- Anthene opalina
- Trimen's ciliate blue (Anthene otacilia)
- Pitman's ciliate blue (Anthene pitmani)
- Allard's silver-line (Apharitis allardi)
- Saharan silverline (Apharitis nilus)
- Common silver-line (Apharitis siphax)
- Rare silver-spot (Aphnaeus argyrocyclus)
- Crowned highflier (Aphnaeus coronae)
- Arhopala agesias
- Bushblue (Arhopala anthelus)
- Arhopala argentea
- Tamil oakblue (Arhopala bazaloides)
- Arhopala cleander
- Arhopala similis
- Spanish argus (Aricia morronensis)
- Green flash (Artipe eryx)
- Aslauga latifurca
- Prouvost's aslauga (Aslauga prouvosti)
- White-banded babul blue (Azanus isis)
- Hildegard's buff (Baliochila hildegarda)
- Lannin's buff (Baliochila singularis)
- Bullis stigmata
- Alternative bush blue (Cacyreus virilis)
- Angled pierrot (Caleta caleta)
- Orange-banded protea butterfly (Capys alphaeus)
- Castalius fasciatus
- Crowley's epitola (Cerautola crowleyi)
- Common imperial (Cheritra freja)
- Beulah's opal (Chrysoritis beulah)
- Citrinophila unipunctata
- Crudaria capensis
- Lorquin's blue (Cupido lorquinii)
- Drupadia cindi
- Drupadia estella
- Purple giant epitola (Epitola urania)
- Western pearly (Eresiomera bicolor)
- Cookson's buff (Euthecta cooksoni)
- Western marble (Falcuna leonensis)
- Good's epitola (Geritola goodii)
- Paphos blue (Glaucopsyche paphos)
- Equatorial mountain blue (Harpendyreus aequatorialis)
- Congo tiger blue (Hewitsonia congoensis)
- Hypochrysops chrysargyra
- Diggles blue (Hypochrysops digglesi)
- Fiery jewel (Hypochrysops ignita)
- Hypolycaena auricostalis
- Shining fairy hairstreak (Hypolycaena coerulea)
- Black fairy hairstreak (Hypolycaena nigra)
- Hypophytala reducta
- Blotched sapphire (Iolaus creta)
- Yellow-banded sapphire (Iolaus diametra)
- Iolaus hemicyanus
- Iasis sapphire (Iolaus iasis)
- Ituri sapphire (Iolaus iturensis)
- Emerald sapphire (Iolaus laonides)
- Parallel sapphire (Iolaus paneperata)
- Dark jewel sapphire (Iolaus sciophilus)
- Nigerian sapphire gem (Iridana nigeriana)
- Jamides caerulea
- Druce's large woolly legs (Lachnocnema luna)
- Lachnocnema sosia
- Spanish purple hairstreak (Laeosopis roboris)
- Cream pierid blue (Larinopoda lircaea)
- Badham's blue (Lepidochrysops badhami)
- Barnes' blue (Lepidochrysops barnesi)
- Kitale giant cupid (Lepidochrysops kitale)
- Lesotho blue (Lepidochrysops lerothodi)
- Quickelberge's blue (Lepidochrysops quickelbergei)
- Leptomyrina boschi
- Cape black-eye (Leptomyrina lara)
- Canary blue (Leptotes webbianus)
- Lipaphnaeus loxura
- Modest false dots (Liptena modesta)
- Liptena praestans
- Liptena turbata
- Yellow liptena (Liptena xanthostola)
- Iberian sooty copper (Lycaena bleusei)
- Eastern harvester (Megalopalpus simplex)
- Common dots (Micropentila adelgitha)
- Micropentila ugandae
- Common acraea mimic (Mimacraea darwinia)
- Maessen's acraea mimic (Mimacraea maesseni)
- Mimacraea skoptoles
- Sharpe's fig tree blue (Myrina sharpei)
- Nacaduba sanaya
- Neoepitola barombiensis
- White imperial butterfly (Neomyrina nivea)
- Mimic liptena (Obania subvariegata)
- Liberian ginger white (Oboronia liberiana)
- Light ginger white (Oboronia pseudopunctatus)
- Ornipholidotos congoensis
- Ornipholidotos etoumbi
- Ornipholidotos gemina
- Ornipholidotos nbeti
- Large glasswing (Ornipholidotos peucetia)
- Common false head (Oxylides faunus)
- Paradeudorix eleala
- Western cream pentila (Pentila picena)
- Cator's fairy playboy (Pilodeudorix catori)
- Dark round-spot (Pilodeudorix leonina)
- Sombre diopetes (Pilodeudorix pseudoderitas)
- Bellier's blue (Plebejus bellieri)
- Glandon blue (Plebejus glandon)
- Spanish zephyr blue (Plebejus hespericus)
- Cretan argus (Plebejus psyloritus)
- Gavarnie blue (Plebejus pyrenaicus)
- Spanish chalkhill blue (Polyommatus albicans)
- Grecian anomalous blue (Polyommatus aroaniensis)
- Azure chalkhill blue (Polyommatus caelestissimus)
- Chalkhill blue (Polyommatus coridon)
- Furry blue (Polyommatus dolus)
- Oberthür's anomalous blue (Polyommatus fabressei)
- Catalan furry blue (Polyommatus fulgens)
- Provence chalkhill blue (Polyommatus hispanus)
- Spotted adonis blue (Polyommatus punctiferus)
- Andalusian anomalous blue (Polyommatus violetae)
- Pseudaletis camarensis
- Pseudaletis dolieri
- Pseudodipsas cephenes
- Baton blue (Pseudophilotes baton)
- Rapala rhodopis
- Spindasis kutu
- Taveta silverline (Spindasis tavetensis)
- Stempfferia badura
- Carpenter's sapphire (Stugeta carpenteri)
- Red imperial (Suasa lisides)
- Boniface's false head (Syrmoptera bonifacei)
- Le Gras' pierrot (Tarucus legrasi)
- Western telipna (Telipna semirufa)
- Thaumaina uranothauma
- Thermoniphas distincta
- Brauns' skolly (Thestor braunsi)
- Moroccan hairstreak (Tomares mauretanicus)
- Larsen's glasswing (Torbenia larseni)
- White pierrot (Tuxentius calice)
- Forest pied pierrot (Tuxentius carana)
- Mountain pierrot (Tuxentius margaritaceus)
- Una usta
- Antinori's branded blue (Uranothauma antinorii)
- Uranothauma cordatus
- Uranothauma delatorum
- Dark grass blue (Zizina antanossa)

==== Nymphalids ====
- Sardinian small tortoiseshell (Aglais ichnusa)
- Chief (Amauris echeria)
- Apatura parisatis
- Bebearia ikelemba
- Laetitia forester (Bebearia laetitia)
- Maligned forester (Bebearia maledicta)
- Fantasiella (Bebearia phantasiella)
- Bebearia severini
- Squinting bush-brown (Bicyclus anynana)
- Small stately bush-brown (Bicyclus evadne)
- Jeffery's bush-brown (Bicyclus jefferyi)
- Black bush-brown (Bicyclus martius)
- Lesser rock bush-brown (Bicyclus milyas)
- Smith's bush-brown (Bicyclus smithi)
- Fox's blue-banded bush-brown (Bicyclus sweadneri)
- Oberthür's pathfinder (Catuna oberthueri)
- Cethosia obscura
- Montane charaxes (Charaxes alpinus)
- Bocquet's demon charaxes (Charaxes bocqueti)
- Green-veined charaxes (Charaxes candiope)
- Silver demon charaxes (Charaxes catachrous)
- Demon charaxes (Charaxes etheocles)
- Charaxes fionae
- Charaxes grahamei
- Blue-spangled charaxes (Charaxes guderiana)
- Imperial blue charaxes (Charaxes imperialis)
- Charaxes phoebus
- Southern hermit (Chazara prieuri)
- Chersonesia excellens
- Chersonesia intermedia
- Cirrochroa regina
- Moroccan pearly heath (Coenonympha arcanioides)
- Corsican heath (Coenonympha corinna)
- Moroccan dusky heath (Coenonympha fettigii)
- Alpine heath (Coenonympha gardetta)
- Eastern large heath (Coenonympha rhodopensis)
- Cretan small heath (Coenonympha thyrsis)
- Cymothoe caenis
- Cream glider (Cymothoe consanguis)
- Cymothoe eris
- Cymothoe haynae
- Weymer's glider (Cymothoe weymeri)
- Zenker's glider (Cymothoe zenkeri)
- Straight line mapwing (Cyrestis nivea)
- Little mapwing (Cyrestis themire)
- False Mnestra ringlet (Erebia aethiopella)
- Almond-eyed ringlet (Erebia alberganus)
- Lorkovic's brassy ringlet (Erebia calcaria)
- Common brassy ringlet (Erebia cassioides)
- Small mountain ringlet (Erebia epiphron)
- Eriphyle ringlet (Erebia eriphyle)
- Silky ringlet (Erebia gorge)
- Gavarnie ringlet (Erebia gorgone)
- Spanish brassy ringlet (Erebia hispania)
- Lefèbvre's ringlet (Erebia lefebvrei)
- Yellow-spotted ringlet (Erebia manto)
- Lesser mountain ringlet (Erebia melampus)
- Black ringlet (Erebia melas)
- Piedmont ringlet (Erebia meolans)
- Mnestra's ringlet (Erebia mnestra)
- Marbled ringlet (Erebia montana)
- Autumn ringlet (Erebia neoridas)
- De Lesse's brassy ringlet (Erebia nivalis)
- Bright eyed ringlet (Erebia oeme)
- Bulgarian ringlet (Erebia orientalis)
- Chapman's ringlet (Erebia palarica)
- Blind ringlet (Erebia pharte)
- Sooty ringlet (Erebia pluto)
- Water ringlet (Erebia pronoe)
- Nicholl's ringlet (Erebia rhodopensis)
- Pyrenees brassy ringlet (Erebia rondoui)
- Larche ringlet (Erebia scipio)
- False dewy ringlet (Erebia sthennyo)
- Styrian ringlet (Erebia stiria)
- Stygian ringlet (Erebia styx)
- De Prunner's ringlet (Erebia triaria)
- Swiss brassy ringlet (Erebia tyndarus)
- Zapater's ringlet (Erebia zapateri)
- Erites elegans
- Eyed cyclops (Erites medura)
- Euphaedra abri
- Crosse's forester (Euphaedra crossei)
- Brown Ceres forester (Euphaedra delera)
- Western blue-banded forester (Euphaedra eupalus)
- Dark brown forester (Euphaedra losinga)
- Modest themis forester (Euphaedra modesta)
- Pear-banded forester (Euphaedra piriformis)
- Simple orange forester (Euphaedra simplex)
- Splendid themis forester (Euphaedra splendens)
- Themis forester (Euphaedra themis)
- Cynthia's fritillary (Euphydryas cynthia)
- Sulawesi striped blue crow (Euploea configurata)
- Euploea core
- Seram crow (Euploea dentiplaga)
- Pagenstecher's crow (Euploea doretta)
- Bismark crow (Euploea eboraci)
- Sulawesi pied crow (Euploea eupator)
- Weymer's crow (Euploea latifasciata)
- Western euptera (Euptera dorothea)
- Ducarme's euptera (Euptera ducarmei)
- Ituri euptera (Euptera ituriensis)
- Loma nymph (Euriphene lomaensis)
- Oban nymph (Euriphene obani)
- Mottled green nymph (Euryphura achlys)
- Euthalia dirtea
- Euthalia djata
- Euthalia malaccana
- White tipped baron (Euthalia merta)
- Fabriciana auresiana
- Corsican fritillary (Fabriciana elisa)
- Angular glider (Harma theobene)
- Common brown (Heteronympha merope)
- Eyed bush brown (Heteropsis perspicua)
- Mountain grayling (Hipparchia algirica)
- Southern grayling (Hipparchia aristaeus)
- Azores grayling (Hipparchia azorina)
- Sicilian grayling (Hipparchia blachieri)
- Moroccan rock grayling (Hipparchia caroli)
- Cretan grayling (Hipparchia cretica)
- Cyprus grayling (Hipparchia cypriensis)
- Gomera grayling (Hipparchia gomera)
- Austaut's grayling (Hipparchia hansii)
- Madeira grayling (Hipparchia maderensis)
- Samos grayling (Hipparchia mersina)
- Le Cerf's grayling (Hipparchia miguelensis)
- Italian grayling (Hipparchia neapolitana)
- Corsican grayling (Hipparchia neomiris)
- Powell's grayling (Hipparchia powelli)
- Grayling (Hipparchia semele)
- Tree grayling (Hipparchia statilinus)
- Gran Canaria grayling (Hipparchia tamadabae)
- Delattin's grayling (Hipparchia volgensis)
- Canary grayling (Hipparchia wyssii)
- Côte d'Ivoire eggfly (Hypolimnas aubergeri)
- Moroccan meadow brown (Hyponephele maroccana)
- Seram small tree-nymph (Ideopsis klassika)
- Ideopsis vulgaris
- Peacock pansy (Junonia almana)
- Yellow pansy (Junonia hierta)
- Dark blue pansy (Junonia oenone)
- Naval pansy (Junonia touhilimasa)
- Pale wall brown (Lasiommata paramegaera)
- Lasippa neriphus
- Cyprus meadow brown (Maniola cypricola)
- Turkish meadow brown (Maniola megala)
- Sardinian meadow brown (Maniola nurag)
- Italian marbled white (Melanargia arge)
- Iberian marbled white (Melanargia lachesis)
- Moroccan marbled white (Melanargia lucasi)
- Sicilian marbled white (Melanargia pherusa)
- Levantine marbled white (Melanargia titea)
- Aetherie fritillary (Melitaea aetherie)
- Little fritillary (Melitaea asteria)
- Meadow fritillary (Melitaea parthenoides)
- Algerian fritillary (Melitaea punica)
- Grisons fritillary (Melitaea varia)
- Moore's bushbrown (Mycalesis heri)
- Itys bush brown (Mycalesis itys)
- Common bush brown (Mycalesis janardana)
- Mycalesis lorna
- Barred false sailor (Neptidopsis fulgurata)
- Scalloped false sailor (Neptidopsis ophione)
- Celebes sailer (Neptis celebica)
- Original club sailer (Neptis melicerta)
- Clubbed sailer (Neptis nicoteles)
- Mountain sailer (Neptis occidentalis)
- Angled petty sailer (Neptis quintilla)
- Alpine grayling (Oeneis glacialis)
- Violet-banded palla (Palla violinitens)
- Crowley's tiger (Parantica crowleyi)
- Morishita's tiger (Parantica hypowattan)
- Kirby's tiger (Parantica kirbyi)
- Manado yellow tiger (Parantica menadensis)
- Least tiger (Parantica pumila)
- Fat tiger (Parantica rotundata)
- Weiske's tiger (Parantica weiskei)
- Canary speckled wood (Pararge xiphioides)
- Spotted-eye brown (Paternympha narycia)
- Toothed commodore (Precis frobeniusi)
- Gaudy commodore (Precis octavia)
- Montane commodore (Precis rauana)
- Glorious begum (Prothoe calydonia)
- Clouded mother-of-pearl (Protogoniomorpha anacardii)
- Martin's false sergeant (Pseudathyma martini)
- Pseudathyma plutonica
- Moroccan grayling (Pseudochazara atlantis)
- Grecian grayling (Pseudochazara graeca)
- Lydian tawny rockbrown (Pseudochazara lydia)
- Nevada grayling (Pseudochazara williamsi)
- Black Satyr (Satyrus actaea)
- Satyrus virbius
- Velvet tree nymph (Sevenia occidentalium)
- Ochreous tree nymph (Sevenia umbrina)
- Robertson's brown (Stygionympha robertsoni)
- Symbrenthia hippalus
- Symbrenthia hypatia
- Taenaris horsfieldii
- Malay viscount (Tanaecia pelea)
- Spring widow (Tarsocera cassus)
- Dark jungle glory (Thaumantis noureddin)
- Scarce blue tiger (Tirumala gautama)
- Vanessa vulcania

==== Skippers ====
Species

- Southern marbled skipper (Carcharodus boeticus)
- False mallow skipper (Carcharodus tripolinus)
- Alpine grizzled skipper (Pyrgus andromedae)
- Foulquier's grizzled skipper (Pyrgus bellieri)
- Dusky grizzled skipper (Pyrgus cacaliae)
- Carline skipper (Pyrgus carlinae)
- Southern grizzled skipper (Pyrgus malvoides)
- Warren's skipper (Pyrgus warrenensis)
- Corsican red-underwing skipper (Spialia therapne)
- Thymelicus christi
- Moroccan small skipper (Thymelicus hamza)

Subspecies

- Oreisplanus munionga larana

==== Pierids ====
- Anthocharis belia
- Provence orange-tip (Anthocharis euphenoides)
- Socotran caper white (Belenois anomala)
- Calypso caper white (Belenois calypso)
- Raffray's white (Belenois raffrayi)
- Red-edged white (Belenois rubrosignata)
- Central caper white (Belenois theuszi)
- Banded gold tip (Colotis eris)
- Purple tip (Colotis ione)
- Yellow splendour (Colotis protomedia)
- Delias enniana
- Delias luctuosa
- Delias periboea
- Rosenberg's painted jezebel (Delias rosenbergi)
- Spotless black-veined small white (Dixeia leucophanes)
- Spanish greenish black-tip (Euchloe bazae)
- Euchloe eversi
- Euchloe grancanariensis
- Canary green-striped white (Euchloe hesperidum)
- Corsican dappled white (Euchloe insularis)
- Mountain dappled white (Euchloe simplonia)
- Eurema alitha
- One-spot yellow grass (Eurema andersoni)
- Small grass yellow (Eurema brigitta)
- Eurema tominia
- Real's wood white (Leptidea reali)
- Asphodel dotted border (Mylothris asphodelus)
- Mylothris continua
- Talbot's dotted border (Mylothris talboti)
- Balkan green-veined white (Pieris balcana)
- Ethiopian cabbage white (Pieris brassicoides)
- Bath white (Pontia daplidice)

==== Riodinids ====
- Delicate judy (Abisara delicata)
- Abisara geza
- Scalloped judy (Abisara rutherfordii)
- Dodona eugenes
- Laxita teneta
- Malay red harliquin (Paralaxita damajanti)
- Paralaxita orphna

=== Beetles ===
There are 423 beetle species assessed as least concern.

==== Geotrupids ====
- Geotrupes douei
- Geotrupes ibericus
- Thorectes armifrons
- Thorectes escorialensis
- Thorectes geminatus
- Thorectes intermedius
- Thorectes laevigatus
- Thorectes nitidus
- Thorectes rugatulus
- Typhaeus typhaeoides

==== Longhorn beetles ====
- Brachypteroma ottomanum
- Callimus abdominalis
- Chlorophorus glabromaculatus
- Chlorophorus ruficornis
- Clytus lama
- Clytus tropicus
- Monochamus sartor
- Ropalopus femoratus

==== Click beetles ====
- Ampedus aethiops
- Ampedus apicalis
- Ampedus auripes
- Ampedus ochrinulus
- Ampedus triangulum
- Stenagostus rufus

==== Eucnemids ====
- Hylis cariniceps
- Hylis procerulus
- Isoriphis marmottani
- Microrhagus emyi
- Microrhagus lepidus
- Microrhagus pygmaeus
- Xylophilus corticalis

==== Scarabaeids ====
- Accrosus carpetanus
- Accrosus siculus
- Accrosus tingitanus
- Agoliinus ragusae
- Agrilinus ibericus
- Allogymnopleurus chloris
- Allogymnopleurus thalassinus
- Amidorus cribricollis
- Amidorus moraguesi
- Ammoecius dentatus
- Ammoecius elevatus
- Ammoecius franzi
- Ammoecius frigidus
- Amphistomus complanatus
- Amphistomus speculifer
- Anomiopus bonariensis
- Anomiopus nigrocoeruleus
- Anomiopus parallelus
- Anomiopus smaragdinus
- Anomiopus virescens
- Anomius annamariae
- Anomius baeticus
- Anomius castaneus
- Anomius segonzaci
- Aphodius algiricus
- Aphodius ghardimaouensis
- Aphodius orbignyi
- Aptenocanthon hopsoni
- Aptenocanthon winyar
- Ateuchetus laticollis
- Ateuchetus puncticollis
- Ateuchetus variolosus
- Ateuchus carbonarius
- Ateuchus latus
- Ateuchus murrayi
- Ateuchus puncticolle
- Aulacopris reichei
- Bdelyrus howdeni
- Besourenga horacioi
- Biralus mahunkaorum
- Bodilus barbarus
- Bodilus beduinus
- Bodilus longispina
- Boletoscapter furcatus
- Bubas bison
- Bubas bubaloides
- Bubas bubalus
- Caccobius cavatus
- Caccobius ferrugineus
- Caccobius nigritulus
- Calamosternus hyxos
- Calamosternus mayeri
- Canthidium bicolor
- Canthidium bokermanni
- Canthidium cavifrons
- Canthidium femoratum
- Canthidium guyanense
- Canthidium latum
- Canthidium manni
- Canthidium sladeni
- Canthidium viride
- Canthochilum anacaona
- Canthon angularis
- Canthon daguerrei
- Canthon deplanatus
- Canthon edentulus
- Canthon heyrovskyi
- Canthon janthinus
- Canthon laminatus
- Canthon lituratus
- Canthon lividus
- Canthon luctuosus
- Canthon lunatus
- Canthon mutabilis
- Canthon orfilai
- Canthon ornatus
- Canthon podagricus
- Canthon quinquemaculatus
- Canthon rubrescens
- Canthon rutilans
- Canthon septemmaculatus
- Canthon smaragdulus
- Canthon sordidus
- Canthon subhyalinus
- Canthon tetraodon
- Canthon triangularis
- Canthon unicolor
- Canthon virens
- Catharsius calaharicus
- Catharsius chinai
- Catharsius oedipus
- Catharsius pandion
- Cephalodesmius armiger
- Cephalodesmius laticollis
- Cheironitis audens
- Cheironitis furcifer
- Cheironitis scabrosus
- Chilothorax albosetosus
- Chilothorax exclamationis
- Chilothorax hieroglyphicus
- Chilothorax lineolatus
- Chilothorax naevuliger
- Chittius anatolicus
- Copris armiger
- Copris fallaciosus
- Copris fidius
- Copris inhalatus
- Copris pueli
- Copris umbilicatus
- Coprophanaeus corythus
- Coprophanaeus gamezi
- Coprophanaeus ohausi
- Coprophanaeus pertyi
- Coptodactyla lesnei
- Coptodactyla nitida
- Coptodactyla storeyi
- Cryptocanthon andersoni
- Cryptocanthon campbellorum
- Cyptochirus ambiguus
- Deltochilum batesi
- Deltochilum brasiliense
- Deltochilum carinatum
- Deltochilum guyanense
- Deltochilum icarus
- Deltochilum peruanum
- Deltochilum rubripenne
- Demarziella imitatrix
- Diastellopalpus infernalis
- Dichotomius apicalis
- Dichotomius calcaratus
- Dichotomius crinicollis
- Dichotomius glaucus
- Dichotomius nimuendaju
- Dichotomius planicollis
- Dichotomius podalirius
- Dichotomius prietoi
- Dichotomius punctulatipennis
- Dichotomius tristis
- Dichotomius worontzowi
- Dicranocara deschodti
- Diorygopyx niger
- Eodrepanus fastiditus
- Eodrepanus parallelus
- Epirinus gratus
- Epirinus validus
- Esymus helenaeliviae
- Esymus sesquivittatus
- Euheptaulacus atlantis
- Euoniticellus inaequalis
- Euoniticellus kawanus
- Euoniticellus nasicornis
- Euonthophagus crocatus
- Euonthophagus tissoni
- Euorodalus tersus
- Frankenbergerius armatus
- Garreta azureus
- Garreta malleolus
- Garreta nitens
- Gromphas aeruginosa
- Gromphas amazonica
- Gymnopleurus aenescens
- Gymnopleurus andreaei
- Gymnopleurus humanus
- Gymnopleurus reichei
- Gymnopleurus virens
- Gyronotus pumilus
- Hansreia affinis
- Heliocopris faunus
- Heliocopris japetus
- Heptaulacus rasettii
- Heteronitis castelnaui
- Homocopris torulosus
- Isocopris tarsalis
- Latodrepanus laticollis
- Lepanus bidentatus
- Lepanus politus
- Lepanus pygmaeus
- Lepanus ustulatus
- Lepanus villosus
- Liatongus arrowi
- Malagoniella argentina
- Malagoniella chalybaea
- Mecynodes leucopterus
- Mecynodes striatulus
- Melinopterus dellacasai
- Melinopterus stolzi
- Melinopterus tingens
- Melinopterus villarreali
- Mendidaphodius paganettii
- Metacatharsius inermis
- Metacatharsius pumilioniformis
- Monoplistes occidentalis
- Monoplistes phanophilus
- Monoplistes tropicus
- Neosisyphus fortuitus
- Neosisyphus macrorubrus
- Neosisyphus mirabilis
- Neosisyphus rubrus
- Nimbus franzinii
- Nimbus richardi
- Odontoloma endroedyi
- Odontoloma louwi
- Odontoloma pygidiale
- Onitis aerarius
- Onitis belial
- Onitis caffer
- Onitis fulgidus
- Onitis granulisetosus
- Onitis ion
- Onitis laminosus
- Onitis mendax
- Onitis obscurus
- Onitis robustus
- Onitis uncinatus
- Ontherus aequatorius
- Ontherus azteca
- Ontherus brevicollis
- Ontherus dentatus
- Ontherus erosioides
- Ontherus laminifer
- Ontherus obliquus
- Ontherus raptor
- Ontherus virescens
- Onthophagus aequepubens
- Onthophagus aethiopicus
- Onthophagus anchommatus
- Onthophagus andalusicus
- Onthophagus anisocerus
- Onthophagus asper
- Onthophagus atricapillus
- Onthophagus atrofasciatus
- Onthophagus atrox
- Onthophagus australis
- Onthophagus beiranus
- Onthophagus bicornis
- Onthophagus binyana
- Onthophagus bornemisszai
- Onthophagus bubalus
- Onthophagus bunamin
- Onthophagus capelliformis
- Onthophagus chepara
- Onthophagus cyaneoniger
- Onthophagus dellacasai
- Onthophagus depressus
- Onthophagus falzonii
- Onthophagus flavolimbatus
- Onthophagus fritschi
- Onthophagus fuscivestis
- Onthophagus giraffa
- Onthophagus granulatus
- Onthophagus gulmarri
- Onthophagus hermonensis
- Onthophagus hirtus
- Onthophagus hoplocerus
- Onthophagus humpatensis
- Onthophagus impressicollis
- Onthophagus janthinus
- Onthophagus jugicola
- Onthophagus juvencus
- Onthophagus kavirondus
- Onthophagus lacustris
- Onthophagus laminatus
- Onthophagus latigena
- Onthophagus leanus
- Onthophagus lemekensis
- Onthophagus lugubris
- Onthophagus mamillatus
- Onthophagus manya
- Onthophagus melitaeus
- Onthophagus muelleri
- Onthophagus mundill
- Onthophagus muticus
- Onthophagus neostenocerus
- Onthophagus nigellus
- Onthophagus nigriventris
- Onthophagus obtusicornis
- Onthophagus onorei
- Onthophagus opacicollis
- Onthophagus panici
- Onthophagus parallelicornis
- Onthophagus parumnotatus
- Onthophagus petrovitzianus
- Onthophagus probus
- Onthophagus propinquus
- Onthophagus pugionatus
- Onthophagus punctatus
- Onthophagus punthari
- Onthophagus quadricuspis
- Onthophagus queenslandicus
- Onthophagus rufosignatus
- Onthophagus semimetallicus
- Onthophagus sericatus
- Onthophagus stigmosus
- Onthophagus stylocerus
- Onthophagus subocelliger
- Onthophagus tamworthi
- Onthophagus tenebrosus
- Onthophagus trapezicornis
- Onthophagus tweedensis
- Onthophagus victoriensis
- Onthophagus vigens
- Onthophagus weringerong
- Onthophagus xanthomerus
- Onthophagus yaran
- Onthophagus yungaburra
- Oxysternon macleayi
- Pachysoma denticollis
- Pachysoma fitzsimonsi
- Pachysoma gariepinus
- Pachysoma hippocrates
- Paracanthon trichonotulus
- Pedaria biseria
- Pedaria conformis
- Pedaria criberrima
- Pedaria decorsei
- Pedaria dentata
- Pedaria durandi
- Pedaria estellae
- Pedaria juhellegrandi
- Pedaria puncticollis
- Pedaria tenebrosa
- Phalacronothus putoni
- Phanaeus bispinus
- Phanaeus prasinus
- Phanaeus pyrois
- Phanaeus sororibispinus
- Plagiogonus esimoides
- Plagiogonus nanus
- Proagoderus atriclaviger
- Proagoderus bicallosus
- Proagoderus extensus
- Proagoderus quadrituber
- Proagoderus sapphirinus
- Pseudacrossus suffertus
- Sauvagesinella palustris
- Scarabaeus aegyptiorum
- Scarabaeus ambiguus
- Scarabaeus costatus
- Scarabaeus damarensis
- Scarabaeus deludens
- Scarabaeus difficilis
- Scarabaeus galenus
- Scarabaeus inoportunus
- Scarabaeus karrooensis
- Scarabaeus laevistriatus
- Scarabaeus namibicus
- Scarabaeus nigroaeneus
- Scarabaeus subaeneus
- Scatimus simulator
- Scatonomus viridis
- Scybalocanthon nigriceps
- Scybalocanthon sexspilotus
- Scybalocanthon trimaculatus
- Scybalophagus patagonicus
- Scybalophagus plicatipennis
- Scybalophagus rugosus
- Sisyphus caffer
- Sisyphus fasciculatus
- Sisyphus natalensis
- Sisyphus ocellatus
- Subrinus vitellinus
- Sulcophanaeus auricollis
- Sulcophanaeus batesi
- Sulcophanaeus imperator
- Sulcophanaeus miyashitai
- Sylvicanthon bridarollii
- Temnoplectron bornemisszai
- Temnoplectron boucomonti
- Temnoplectron cooki
- Temnoplectron disruptum
- Temnoplectron finnigani
- Temnoplectron rotundum
- Temnoplectron subvolitans
- Tomogonus crassus
- Trichillidium quadridens
- Uroxys coarctatus
- Uroxys dilaticollis
- Uroxys elongatus
- Uroxys variabilis
- Xinidium davisi

==== Other beetle species ====
- Allopentarthrum elumbe
- Dacne notata
- Dorcus musimon
- Dryotribus mimeticus
- Grynocharis oblonga
- Lucanus barbarossa
- Lucanus tetraodon
- Macrancylus linearis
- Platycerus spinifer
- Scobicia barbifrons
- Scobicia ficicola
- Tritoma bipustulata

=== Odonata ===
Odonata includes dragonflies and damselflies. There are 1690 species and five subspecies in the order Odonata assessed as least concern.

==== Platystictids ====
- Drepanosticta anascephala
- Drepanosticta carmichaeli
- Palaemnema abbreviata
- Palaemnema brucelli
- Elongate shadowdamsel (Palaemnema gigantula)
- Palaemnema joanetta
- Palaemnema melanura
- Palaemnema nathalia
- Cordoba shadowdamsel (Palaemnema paulicoba)
- Palaemnema paulina
- Palaemnema paulitaba
- Palaemnema picicaudata
- Short-winged shadowdamsel (Protosticta beaumonti)
- Protosticta curiosa
- Protosticta davenporti
- Protosticta geijskesi
- Protosticta grandis
- Protosticta gravelyi
- Protosticta linnaei
- Protosticta medusa
- Protosticta rufostigma
- Protosticta taipokauensis
- Sinosticta debra
- Sinosticta ogatai

==== Chlorogomphids ====
- Chlorogomphus arooni
- Chlorogomphus campioni
- Chlorogomphus iriomotensis
- Chlorogomphus papilio
- Watanabeopetalia atkinsoni

==== Argiolestids ====
- Little flatwing (Argiolestes pusillus)
- Powdered flatwing (Austroargiolestes calcaris)
- Caledopteryx maculata
- Caledopteryx sarasini
- Neurolestes trinervis
- Podolestes orientalis
- Trineuragrion percostale

==== Perilestids ====
- Attenuate twigtail (Perilestes attenuatus)
- Perilestes kahli
- Perilestes solutus
- Perissolestes cornutus
- Perissolestes remotus

==== Chlorocyphids ====
- Blue jewel (Chlorocypha aphrodite)
- Exquisite jewel (Chlorocypha cancellata)
- Southern red jewel (Chlorocypha consueta)
- Blue-tipped jewel (Chlorocypha curta)
- Blue-fronted jewel (Chlorocypha cyanifrons)
- Orange-nosed jewel (Chlorocypha dahli)
- Little red jewel (Chlorocypha dispar)
- Spotted jewel (Chlorocypha fabamacula)
- Frigid jewel (Chlorocypha frigida)
- Eastern red-tipped jewel (Chlorocypha glauca)
- Orange jewel (Chlorocypha luminosa)
- River jewel (Chlorocypha pyriformosa)
- Western red-tipped jewel (Chlorocypha radix)
- Rosy jewel (Chlorocypha rubida)
- Blue-faced jewel (Chlorocypha selysi)
- Southern red-tipped jewel (Chlorocypha seydeli)
- Blue-nosed jewel (Chlorocypha trifaria)
- Victoria's jewel (Chlorocypha victoriae)
- Katanga jewel (Chlorocypha wittei)
- Cyrano unicolor
- Libellago aurantiaca
- Libellago hyalina
- Libellago lineata
- Libellago rufescens
- Libellago stigmatizans
- Dancing jewel (Platycypha caligata)
- Boulder jewel (Platycypha fitzsimonsi)
- Forest jewel (Platycypha lacustris)
- Beautiful jewel (Platycypha rufitibia)
- Rhinocypha arguta
- Rhinocypha biforata
- Rhinocypha bisignata
- Rhinocypha chaoi
- Rhinocypha drusilla
- Rhinocypha fenestrella
- Rhinocypha ignipennis
- Rhinocypha immaculata
- Rhinocypha iridea
- Rhinocypha pelops
- Common blue jewel (Rhinocypha perforata)
- Rhinocypha quadrimaculata
- Rhinocypha spuria
- Rhinocypha trifasciata
- Rhinocypha unimaculata
- Rhinocypha watsoni
- Graceful jewel (Stenocypha gracilis)
- Slender jewel (Stenocypha tenuis)

==== Platycnemidids ====
Species

- Red-backed yellowwing (Allocnemis contraria)
- Blue-tipped yellowwing (Allocnemis cyanura)
- Orange yellowwing (Allocnemis elongata)
- Dark yellowwing (Allocnemis flavipennis)
- Goldtail (Allocnemis leucosticta)
- Blue-shouldered threadtail (Allocnemis marshalli)
- Rainbow yellowwing (Allocnemis nigripes)
- Orange-tipped threadtail (Allocnemis pauli)
- Blue yellowwing (Allocnemis subnodalis)
- Allocnemis superba
- Allocnemis wittei
- Powder blue damselfly (Arabicnemis caerulea)
- Calicnemia chaseni
- Calicnemia doonensis
- Calicnemia erythromelas
- Calicnemia eximia
- Calicnemia imitans
- Calicnemia miles
- Calicnemia miniata
- Calicnemia mortoni
- Calicnemia pulverulans
- Calicnemia sinensis
- Coeliccia albicauda
- Coeliccia bimaculata
- Coeliccia chromothorax
- Coeliccia cyanomelas
- Coeliccia didyma
- Coeliccia doisuthepensis
- Coeliccia flavicauda
- Coeliccia kazukoae
- Coeliccia loogali
- Coeliccia poungyi
- Coeliccia renifera
- Coeliccia scutellum
- Coeliccia yamasakii
- Copera annulata
- Copera chantaburii
- Copera ciliata
- Congo featherleg (Copera congolensis)
- Copera guttifera
- Copera marginipes
- Eastern featherleg (Copera nyansana)
- Copera rufipes
- Little featherleg (Copera sikassoensis)
- Copera vittata
- Disparoneura quadrimaculata
- Eastern red threadtail (Elattoneura acuta)
- Elattoneura balli
- Elattoneura cellularis
- Elattoneura centrafricana
- Sooty threadtail (Elattoneura frenulata)
- Western red threadtail (Elattoneura girardi)
- Common threadtail (Elattoneura glauca)
- Elattoneura incerta
- Elattoneura josemorai
- Elattoneura lliba
- Elattoneura nigra
- Elattoneura pruinosa
- Elattoneura tetrica
- Orange-fronted threadtail (Elattoneura vittata)
- Elattoneura vrijdaghi
- Esme longistyla
- Idiocnemis bidentata
- Idiocnemis inaequidens
- Idioneura ancilla
- Indocnemis orang
- Mesocnemis robusta
- Common riverjack (Mesocnemis singularis)
- Green-blue threadtail (Nososticta coelestina)
- Nososticta erythrura
- Nososticta plagiata
- Fivespot threadtail (Nososticta solitaris)
- Paramecocnemis erythrostigma
- Orange featherleg (Platycnemis acutipennis)
- Ivory featherleg (Platycnemis dealbata)
- Kerville's featherleg (Platycnemis kervillei)
- White featherleg (Platycnemis latipes)
- White-legged damselfly (Platycnemis pennipes)
- Barbary featherleg (Platycnemis subdilatata)
- Prodasineura auricolor
- Prodasineura autumnalis
- Prodasineura coerulescens
- Prodasineura collaris
- Prodasineura croconota
- Prodasineura hosei
- Prodasineura laidlawii
- Prodasineura odzalae
- Prodasineura verticalis
- White-fronted threadtail (Prodasineura villiersi)
- Risiocnemis asahinai
- Risiocnemis atripes
- Risiocnemis atropurpurea
- Tricklejack (Stenocnemis pachystigma)

Subspecies

- Platycnemis pennipes nitidula

==== Synlestids ====
- Conspicuous malachite (Chlorolestes conspicuus)
- Drakensberg malachite (Chlorolestes draconicus)
- Mountain malachite (Chlorolestes fasciatus)
- Forest malachite (Chlorolestes tessellatus)
- White malachite (Chlorolestes umbratus)
- Megalestes distans
- Megalestes haui
- Megalestes heros
- Megalestes kurahashii
- Megalestes major
- Megalestes micans
- Sinolestes editus

==== Megapodagrionids ====
- Agriomorpha fusca
- Allopodagrion contortum
- Archaeopodagrion armatum
- Archaeopodagrion bicorne
- Burmargiolestes melanothorax
- Dimeragrion percubitale
- Heteragrion aequatoriale
- Heteragrion aurantiacum
- Heteragrion bickorum
- Heteragrion cooki
- Heteragrion erythrogastrum
- Heteragrion majus
- Heteragrion makiritare
- Highland flatwing (Heteragrion tricellulare)
- Heteropodagrion croizati
- Heteropodagrion sanguinipes
- Mesagrion leucorrhinum
- Mesopodagrion tibetanum
- Oxystigma petiolatum
- Oxystigma williamsoni
- Paraphlebia quinta
- Philogenia boliviana
- Philogenia buenavista
- Philogenia cassandra
- Philogenia championi
- Philogenia elisabeta
- Philogenia leonora
- Philogenia macuma
- Philogenia mangosisa
- Philogenia minteri
- Philogenia peacocki
- Philogenia redunca
- Philogenia silvarum
- Rhinagrion hainanense
- Rhinagrion mima
- Rhinagrion philippina
- Rhinagrion viridatum
- Rhipidolestes asatoi
- Rhipidolestes cyanoflavus
- Rhipidolestes janetae
- Rhipidolestes owadai
- Tatocnemis malgassica
- Teinopodagrion angulatum
- Teinopodagrion caquetanum
- Teinopodagrion chinchaysuyum
- Teinopodagrion croizati
- Teinopodagrion curtum
- Teinopodagrion decipiens
- Teinopodagrion depressum
- Teinopodagrion eretes
- Teinopodagrion mercenarium
- Teinopodagrion meridionale
- Teinopodagrion nebulosum
- Teinopodagrion schiessi
- Teinopodagrion setigerum
- Teinopodagrion yunka
- Giant waterfall damsel (Thaumatoneura inopinata)

==== Gomphids ====
- Amphigomphus hansoni
- Amphigomphus nakamurai
- Anisogomphus anderi
- Anisogomphus bivittatus
- Anisogomphus koxingai
- Anisogomphus maacki
- Anisogomphus occipitalis
- Anormogomphus heteropterus
- Southern dragon (Antipodogomphus acolythus)
- Aphylla boliviana
- Aphylla brasiliensis
- Aphylla brevipes
- Narrow-striped forceptail (Aphylla protracta)
- Aphylla tenuis
- Aphylla theodorina
- Two-striped forceptail (Aphylla williamsoni)
- Archaeogomphus hamatus
- Asiagomphus acco
- Asiagomphus pacificus
- Asiagomphus septimus
- Pale hunter (Austrogomphus amphiclitus)
- Jade hunter (Austrogomphus ochraceus)
- Burmagomphus divaricatus
- Burmagomphus intinctus
- Burmagomphus pyramidalis
- Burmagomphus sivalikensis
- Burmagomphus sowerbyi
- Burmagomphus vermicularis
- Burmagomphus williamsoni
- Common thorntail (Ceratogomphus pictus)
- Horned talontail (Crenigomphus cornutus)
- Clubbed talontail (Crenigomphus hartmanni)
- Kavango talontail (Crenigomphus kavangoensis)
- Western talontail (Crenigomphus renei)
- Cyanogomphus waltheri
- Davidius aberrans
- Davidius davidii
- Davidius fruhstorferi
- Davidius nanus
- Desmogomphus paucinervis
- Diaphlebia angustipennis
- Diastatomma bicolor
- Diastatomma gamblesi
- Diastatomma multilineatum
- Diastatomma selysi
- Diastatomma soror
- Diastatomma tricolor
- Southeastern spinyleg (Dromogomphus armatus)
- Black-shouldered spinyleg (Dromogomphus spinosus)
- Volcano knobtail (Epigomphus echeverrii)
- Epigomphus paludosus
- Epigomphus quadracies
- One-striped ringtail (Erpetogomphus bothrops)
- Knob-tipped ringtail (Erpetogomphus constrictor)
- Yellow-legged ringtail (Erpetogomphus crotalinus)
- Serpent ringtail (Erpetogomphus lampropeltis)
- Dark-shouldered ringtail (Erpetogomphus liopeltis)
- Erpetogomphus sabaleticus
- Erpetogomphus sipedon
- Erpetogomphus tristani
- Erpetogomphus viperinus
- Hong Kong tusktail (Fukienogomphus choifongae)
- Fukienogomphus prometheus
- Fukienogomphus promineus
- Gomphidia abbotti
- Northern fingertail (Gomphidia bredoi)
- Gomphidia confluens
- Gomphidia gamblesi
- Gomphidia kruegeri
- Gomphidia maclachlani
- Southern fingertail (Gomphidia quarrei)
- Gomphidia t-nigrum
- Gomphidictinus perakensis
- Spine-crowned clubtail (Gomphus abbreviatus)
- Levant clubtail (Gomphus davidi)
- Blackwater clubtail (Gomphus dilatatus)
- Lancet clubtail (Gomphus exilis)
- River clubtail (Gomphus flavipes)
- Splendid clubtail (Gomphus lineatifrons)
- Gulf coast clubtail (Gomphus modestus)
- Ozark clubtail (Gomphus ozarkensis)
- Piedmont clubtail (Gomphus parvidens)
- Western clubtail (Gomphus pulchellus)
- Turkish clubtail (Gomphus schneiderii)
- Septima's clubtail (Gomphus septima)
- Common clubtail (Gomphus vulgatissimus)
- Dragonhunter (Hagenius brevistylus)
- Heliogomphus bakeri
- Heliogomphus retroflexus
- Heliogomphus scorpio
- Heliogomphus selysi
- Rainforest vicetail (Hemigomphus theischingeri)
- Ictinogomphus angulosus
- Ictinogomphus decoratus
- Swamp tigertail (Ictinogomphus dundoensis)
- Common tiger (Ictinogomphus ferox)
- Ictinogomphus fraseri
- Ictinogomphus pertinax
- Ictinogomphus rapax
- Ictinogomphus regisalberti
- Ictinogomphus tenax
- Isomma hieroglyphicum
- Labrogomphus torvus
- Lamelligomphus biforceps
- Lamelligomphus camelus
- Lamelligomphus hainanensis
- Lamelligomphus ringens
- Leptogomphus celebratus
- Leptogomphus coomansi
- Leptogomphus divaricatus
- Leptogomphus gestroi
- Leptogomphus perforatus
- Leptogomphus risi
- Leptogomphus yayeyamensis
- Spined fairytail (Lestinogomphus angustus)
- Lestinogomphus congoensis
- Lestinogomphus matilei
- Large horntail (Libyogomphus tenaculatus)
- Bladetail (Lindenia tetraphylla)
- Macrogomphus parallelogramma
- Mastigogomphus chapini
- Mastigogomphus dissimilis
- Megalogomphus sommeri
- Megalogomphus sumatranus
- Melanocacus mungo
- Melligomphus ardens
- Merogomphus parvus
- Merogomphus pavici
- Microgomphus camerunensis
- Microgomphus chelifer
- Microgomphus jannyae
- Microgomphus nyassicus
- Congo scissortail (Microgomphus schoutedeni)
- Microgomphus souteri
- Microgomphus thailandica
- Neogomphus bidens
- Nepogomphus modestus
- Nepogomphus walli
- Neurogomphus alius
- Striped siphontail (Neurogomphus featheri)
- Neurogomphus fuscifrons
- Neurogomphus martininus
- Neurogomphus uelensis
- Neurogomphus wittei
- Zambezi siphontail (Neurogomphus zambeziensis)
- Nihonogomphus cultratus
- Nihonogomphus ruptus
- Nihonogomphus thomassoni
- Nihonogomphus viridis
- Notogomphus dendrohyrax
- Little longleg (Notogomphus dorsalis)
- Notogomphus kilimandjaricus
- Northern longleg (Notogomphus lecythus)
- Clubbed longleg (Notogomphus leroyi)
- Albertine longleg (Notogomphus lujai)
- Notogomphus moorei
- Southern yellowjack (Notogomphus praetorius)
- Notogomphus spinosus
- Notogomphus zernyi
- Nychogomphus duaricus
- Grappletail (Octogomphus specularis)
- Green-eyed hooktail (Onychogomphus forcipatus)
- Pale pincertail (Onychogomphus lefebvrii)
- Onychogomphus nilgiriensis
- Onychogomphus schmidti
- Onychogomphus seydeli
- Northern dark claspertail (Onychogomphus styx)
- Gorge claspertail (Onychogomphus supinus)
- Extra-striped snaketail (Ophiogomphus anomalus)
- Arizona snaketail (Ophiogomphus arizonicus)
- Brook snaketail (Ophiogomphus aspersus)
- Bison snaketail (Ophiogomphus bison)
- Green gomphid (Ophiogomphus cecilia)
- Boreal snaketail (Ophiogomphus colubrinus)
- Pygmy snaketail (Ophiogomphus howei)
- Sinuous snaketail (Ophiogomphus occidentis)
- Ophiogomphus reductus
- Saint Croix snaketail (Ophiogomphus susbehcha)
- Orientogomphus minor
- Paragomphus abnormis
- Paragomphus acuminatus
- Highland hooktail (Paragomphus alluaudi)
- Paragomphus bredoi
- Paragomphus capitatus
- Paragomphus capricornis
- Rock hocktail (Paragomphus cognatus)
- Corkscrew hooktail (Paragomphus elpidius)
- Common hooktail (Paragomphus genei)
- Paragomphus lacustris
- Lined hooktail (Paragomphus lineatus)
- Great hooktail (Paragomphus magnus)
- Paragomphus nigroviridis
- Paragomphus nyasicus
- Paragomphus pardalinus
- Small hooktail (Paragomphus pumilio)
- Flapper hooktail (Paragomphus sabicus)
- Paragomphus serrulatus
- Green-fronted hooktail (Paragomphus viridior)
- Perissogomphus stevensi
- Peruviogomphus moyobambus
- Peruviogomphus pearsoni
- Phaenandrogomphus asthenes
- Phaenandrogomphus tonkinicus
- Phyllocycla basidenta
- Phyllocycla breviphylla
- Phyllocycla hespera
- Phyllocycla titschacki
- Phyllocycla viridipleuris
- Phyllocycla volsella
- Phyllogomphoides andromeda
- Phyllogomphoides angularis
- Phyllogomphoides annectens
- Phyllogomphoides apiculatus
- Phyllogomphoides cepheus
- Phyllogomphoides duodentatus
- Phyllogomphoides lieftincki
- Phyllogomphoides nayaritensis
- Four-striped leaftail (Phyllogomphoides stigmatus)
- Phyllogomphus aethiops
- Phyllogomphus annulus
- Phyllogomphus coloratus
- Phyllogomphus moundi
- Phyllogomphus pseudoccidentalis
- Crowned leaftail (Phyllogomphus schoutedeni)
- Bold leaftail (Phyllogomphus selysi)
- Platygomphus dolabratus
- Bolivian sanddragon (Progomphus boliviensis)
- Progomphus brachycnemis
- Progomphus complicatus
- Progomphus costalis
- Progomphus herrerae
- Progomphus incurvatus
- Progomphus intricatus
- Progomphus mexicanus
- Progomphus montanus
- Progomphus phyllochromus
- Progomphus pijpersi
- Progomphus pygmaeus
- Scalmogomphus bistrigatus
- Sieboldius deflexus
- Sieboldius japponicus
- Golden flangetail (Sinictinogomphus clavatus)
- Stylogomphus chunliuae
- Stylogomphus inglisi
- Stylogomphus suzukii
- Riverine clubtail (Stylurus amnicola)
- Stylurus clathratus
- Shining clubtail (Stylurus ivae)
- Stylurus nanningensis
- Russet-tipped clubtail (Stylurus plagiatus)
- Zebra clubtail (Stylurus scudderi)
- Arrow clubtail (Stylurus spiniceps)
- Tibiagomphus uncatus
- Tragogomphus aurivillii
- Trigomphus beatus
- Trigomphus citimus

==== Cordulegastrids ====
- Anotogaster gregoryi
- Anotogaster nipalensis
- Cordulegaster brevistigma
- Apache spiketail (Cordulegaster diadema)
- Blue-eyed goldenring (Cordulegaster insignis)
- Cordulegaster mzymtae
- Arrowhead spiketail (Cordulegaster obliqua)
- Turkish goldenring (Cordulegaster picta)
- Ouachita spiketail (Cordulegaster talaria)
- Neallogaster hermionae
- Neallogaster latifrons
- Sinorogomphus nasutus
- Sinorogomphus tunti

==== Corduliids ====
- Dusk dragonfly (Antipodochlora braueri)
- Downy emerald (Cordulia aenea)
- Epitheca marginata
- Uhler's sundragon (Helocordulia uhleri)
- African emerald (Hemicordulia africana)
- Hemicordulia asiatica
- Australian emerald (Hemicordulia australiae)
- Fat-bellied emerald (Hemicordulia continentalis)
- Hemicordulia fidelis
- Hemicordulia intermedia
- Hemicordulia lulico
- Hemicordulia okinawensis
- Hemicordulia similis
- Hemicordulia tenera
- Heteronaias heterodoxa
- Offshore emerald (Metaphya tillyardi)
- Alabama shadowdragon (Neurocordulia alabamensis)
- Umber shadowdragon (Neurocordulia obsoleta)
- Cinnamon shadowdragon (Neurocordulia virginiensis)
- Western swamp emerald (Procordulia affinis)
- Yellow spotted dragonfly (Procordulia grayi)
- Eastern swamp emerald (Procordulia jacksoniensis)
- Ranger dragonfly (Procordulia smithii)
- Quebec emerald (Somatochlora brevicincta)
- Lake emerald (Somatochlora cingulata)
- Somatochlora dido
- Somatochlora flavomaculata
- Delicate emerald (Somatochlora franklini)
- Hudsonian emerald (Somatochlora hudsonica)
- Incurvate emerald (Somatochlora incurvata)
- Balkan emerald (Somatochlora meridionalis)
- Brilliant emerald (Somatochlora metallica)
- Beaverpond baskettail (Tetragoneuria canis)
- Florida baskettail (Tetragoneuria stella)

==== Calopterygids ====
- Archineura hetaerinoides
- Archineura incarnata
- Caliphaea confusa
- Caliphaea nitens
- River jewelwing (Calopteryx aequabilis)
- Appalachian jewelwing (Calopteryx angustipennis)
- Calopteryx atrata
- Calopteryx cornelia
- Copper demoiselle (Calopteryx haemorrhoidalis)
- Calopteryx melli
- Calopteryx orientalis
- Banded demoiselle (Calopteryx splendens)
- Beautiful demoiselle (Calopteryx virgo)
- Western demoiselle (Calopteryx xanthostoma)
- Echo margarita
- Echo modesta
- Echo uniformis
- Hetaerina aurora
- Hook-tipped rubyspot (Hetaerina curvicauda)
- Hetaerina duplex
- Hetaerina flavipennis
- Hetaerina hebe
- Hetaerina infecta
- Hetaerina majuscula
- Hetaerina sempronia
- Canyon rubyspot (Hetaerina vulnerata)
- Tepui shinywing (Iridictyon myersi)
- White-banded shinywing (Iridictyon trebbaui)
- Matrona basilaris
- Mnais andersoni
- Mnais gregoryi
- Mnais mneme
- Mnais pruinosa
- Mnais yunosukei
- Mnesarete devillei
- Mnesarete drepane
- Mnesarete ephippium
- Mnesarete guttifera
- Neurobasis anumariae
- Neurobasis chinensis
- Neurobasis kimminsi
- Neurobasis longipes
- Ormenophlebia imperatrix
- Ormenophlebia regina
- Ormenophlebia saltuum
- Forest flashwing (Phaon camerunensis)
- Glistening demoiselle (Phaon iridipennis)
- Spring bluewing (Sapho bicolor)
- Western bluewing (Sapho ciliata)
- Glorious bluewing (Sapho gloriosa)
- Eastern bluewing (Sapho orichalcea)
- Broad-winged sparklewing (Umma cincta)
- Metallic sparklewing (Umma electa)
- Bare-bellied sparklewing (Umma longistigma)
- Hairy-bellied sparklewing (Umma mesostigma)
- Sapphire sparklewing (Umma saphirina)
- Vestalaria miao
- Vestalaria smaragdina
- Vestalaria velata
- Vestalaria vinnula
- Vestalis amethystina
- Vestalis amoena
- Vestalis anne
- Vestalis apicalis
- Vestalis atropha
- Vestalis gracilis
- Vestalis venusta

==== Coenagrionids ====
Species

- Acanthagrion ablutum
- Acanthagrion adustum
- Acanthagrion chacoense
- Acanthagrion cuyabae
- Acanthagrion inexpectum
- Acanthagrion kennedii
- Acanthagrion longispinosum
- Acanthagrion obsoletum
- Acanthagrion peruanum
- Acanthagrion peruvianum
- Acanthagrion speculum
- Acanthagrion tepuiense
- Acanthagrion truncatum
- Acanthagrion yungarum
- Blue slim (Aciagrion africanum)
- Aciagrion approximans
- Aciagrion azureum
- Aciagrion borneense
- Aciagrion fragile
- Graceful slim (Aciagrion gracile)
- Long slim (Aciagrion heterosticta)
- Aciagrion hisopa
- Aciagrion migratum
- Aciagrion occidentale
- Aciagrion olympicum
- Aciagrion pallidum
- Swamp slim (Aciagrion steeleae)
- Aciagrion tillyardi
- Aeolagrion axine
- Elongate bluet (Africallagma elongatum)
- Africallagma glaucum
- Africallagma pallidulum
- Spotted bluet (Africallagma pseudelongatum)
- Sapphire bluet (Africallagma sapphirinum)
- Peak bluet (Africallagma sinuatum)
- Fragile bluet (Africallagma subtile)
- Forest bluet (Africallagma vaginale)
- Blue wisp (Agriocnemis angolensis)
- Agriocnemis clauseni
- Agriocnemis dabreui
- Little wisp (Agriocnemis exilis)
- White-masked wisp (Agriocnemis falcifera)
- Agriocnemis femina
- Forceps wisp (Agriocnemis forcipata)
- Gracious wisp (Agriocnemis gratiosa)
- Highland wisp (Agriocnemis inversa)
- Agriocnemis keralensis
- Agriocnemis lacteola
- Forest wisp (Agriocnemis maclachlani)
- Agriocnemis minima
- Agriocnemis nana
- Agriocnemis pieris
- Pinhey's wisp (Agriocnemis pinheyi)
- Wandering midget (Agriocnemis pygmaea)
- Orange wisp (Agriocnemis ruberrima)
- Nile wisp (Agriocnemis sania)
- Agriocnemis splendissima
- Congo wisp (Agriocnemis stygia)
- Lesser pincer-tailed wisp (Agriocnemis victoria)
- Sahel wisp (Agriocnemis zerafica)
- Amazoneura westfalli
- Eastern red damsel (Amphiagrion saucium)
- Amphiallagma parvum
- Amphicnemis martini
- Anisagrion allopterum
- Anisagrion inornatum
- Antiagrion gayi
- Antiagrion grinbergsi
- Archibasis crucigera
- Archibasis oscillans
- Archibasis viola
- Paiute dancer (Argia alberta)
- Blue-fronted dancer (Argia apicalis)
- Argia croceipennis
- Argia dives
- Argia frequentula
- Argia garrisoni
- Argia gerhardi
- Argia hamulata
- Huanacina dancer (Argia huanacina)
- Argia inculta
- Argia infrequentula
- Argia kokama
- Leonora's dancer (Argia leonorae)
- Argia limitata
- Sooty dancer (Argia lugens)
- Powdered dancer (Argia moesta)
- Argia nigrior
- Amethyst dancer (Argia pallens)
- Springwater dancer (Argia plana)
- Argia pocomana
- Argia popoluca
- Golden-winged dancer (Argia rhoadsi)
- Tarascan dancer (Argia tarascana)
- Blue-tipped dancer (Argia tibialis)
- Argia underwoodi
- Argia variata
- Westfall (Argia westfalli)
- Argia yungensis
- Red-tipped shadefly (Argiocnemis rubescens)
- Austroagrion exclamationis
- Austrocoenagrion lyelli
- Sailing azuret (Azuragrion nigridorsum)
- Somali azuret (Azuragrion somalicum)
- Tiny azuret (Azuragrion vansomereni)
- Cercion malayanum
- Ceriagrion aeruginosum
- Green-eyed waxtail (Ceriagrion annulatum)
- Orange-tailed sprite (Ceriagrion auranticum)
- Ceriagrion azureum
- Blue-fronted waxtail (Ceriagrion bakeri)
- Ceriagrion bellona
- Ceriagrion calamineum
- Ceriagrion cerinorubellum
- Ceriagrion chaoi
- Green-fronted waxtail (Ceriagrion corallinum)
- Ceriagrion coromandelianum
- Ceriagrion fallax
- Common waxtail (Ceriagrion glabrum)
- Little red waxtail (Ceriagrion ignitum)
- Ceriagrion indochinense
- Little orange waxtail (Ceriagrion kordofanicum)
- Ceriagrion malaisei
- Ceriagrion melanurum
- East coast waxtail (Ceriagrion mourae)
- Ceriagrion olivaceum
- Ceriagrion praetermissum
- Red-tipped waxtail (Ceriagrion rubellocerinum)
- Cream-sided waxtail (Ceriagrion sakejii)
- Plain waxtail (Ceriagrion suave)
- Fiery waxtail (Ceriagrion tricrenaticeps)
- Orange-red waxtail (Ceriagrion varians)
- Yellow-faced waxtail (Ceriagrion whellani)
- Norfolk damselfly (Coenagrion armatum)
- Mediterranean bluet (Coenagrion caerulescens)
- Spearhead bluet (Coenagrion hastulatum)
- Ornate bluet (Coenagrion ornatum)
- Coenagrion ponticum
- Azure damselfly (Coenagrion puella)
- Variable damselfly (Coenagrion pulchellum)
- Taiga bluet (Coenagrion resolutum)
- Dainty damselfly (Coenagrion scitulum)
- Coenagrion terue
- Cyanallagma bonariense
- Cyanallagma interruptum
- Denticulobasis dunklei
- Drepanoneura flinti
- Drepanoneura loutoni
- Drepanoneura muzoni
- Drepanoneura peruviensis
- Drepanoneura tennesseni
- Tule bluet (Enallagma carunculatum)
- Enallagma circulatum
- Common blue damselfly (Enallagma cyathigerum)
- Sandhill bluet (Enallagma davisi)
- Desert bluet (Enallagma deserti)
- Atlantic bluet (Enallagma doubledayi)
- Burgundy bluet (Enallagma dubium)
- Marsh bluet (Enallagma ebrium)
- Stream bluet (Enallagma exsulans)
- New England bluet (Enallagma laterale)
- Enallagma minusculum
- Slender bluet (Enallagma traviatum)
- Epipleoneura capilliformis
- Epipleoneura fuscaenea
- Epipleoneura kaxuriana
- Epipleoneura lamina
- Epipleoneura manauensis
- Epipleoneura metallica
- Epipleoneura williamsoni
- Epipotoneura nehalennia
- Goblet-marked damselfly (Erythromma lindenii)
- Small red-eyed damselfly (Erythromma viridulum)
- Helveciagrion obsoletum
- Helveciagrion simulacrum
- Painted damsel (Hesperagrion heterodoxum)
- Homeoura ambigua
- Ischnura acuticauda
- Gossamer damselfly (Ischnura aurora)
- Ischnura chingaza
- Ischnura cruzi
- Ischnura cyane
- Blue-tailed damselfly (Ischnura elegans)
- Desert bluetail (Ischnura evansi)
- Ischnura fluviatilis
- Ischnura forcipata
- Oasis bluetail (Ischnura fountaineae)
- Island bluetail (Ischnura genei)
- Iberian bluetail (Ischnura graellsii)
- Western forktail (Ischnura perparva)
- Fragile forktail (Ischnura posita)
- Scarce blue-tailed damselfly (Ischnura pumilio)
- Rambur's forktail (Ischnura ramburii)
- Ischnura rufostigma
- Sahara bluetail (Ischnura saharensis)
- Tropical bluetail (Ischnura senegalensis)
- Leptagrion macrurum
- Leptagrion perlongum
- Caribbean swampdamsel (Leptobasis candelaria)
- Leptobasis inversa
- Lucifer swampdamsel (Leptobasis lucifer)
- Leptobasis mauffrayi
- Red-tipped swampdamsel (Leptobasis vacillans)
- Blue-tipped helicopter (Mecistogaster buckleyi)
- Ornate helicopter (Mecistogaster ornata)
- Adytum swamp damselfly (Megalagrion adytum)
- Koele mountain damselfly (Megalagrion koelense)
- Mesamphiagrion occultum
- Mesamphiagrion risi
- Mesoleptobasis incus
- Metaleptobasis foreli
- Metaleptobasis furcifera
- Metaleptobasis knopfi
- Metaleptobasis mauffrayi
- Metaleptobasis prostrata
- Metaleptobasis westfalli
- Minagrion mecistogastrum
- Minagrion waltheri
- Mortonagrion aborense
- Mortonagrion falcatum
- Sphagnum sprite (Nehalennia gracilis)
- Neoerythromma gladiolatum
- Amelia's threadtail (Neoneura amelia)
- Neoneura bilinearis
- Neoneura desana
- Neoneura fulvicollis
- Onychargia atrocyana
- Oreiallagma acutum
- Oreiallagma oreas
- Oreiallagma quadricolor
- Oxyagrion bruchi
- Oxyagrion impunctatum
- Oxyagrion miniopsis
- Oxyagrion sulinum
- Oxyagrion tennesseni
- Oxyallagma colombianum
- Palaiargia humida
- Dusky lilysquatter (Paracercion calamorum)
- Paracercion dorothea
- Eastern lilysquatter (Paracercion melanotum)
- Paracercion v-nigrum
- Pericnemis stictica
- Phoenicagrion paulsoni
- Angola bluet (Pinheyagrion angolicum)
- Round-winged bluet (Proischnura rotundipennis)
- Fork-tailed bluet (Proischnura subfurcata)
- Protoneura amatoria
- Protoneura aurantiaca
- Protoneura calverti
- Protoneura cupida
- Purple threadtail (Protoneura dunklei)
- Red-legged threadtail (Protoneura sanguinipes)
- Sulphury threadtail (Protoneura sulfurata)
- Scarlet-backed threadtail (Protoneura tenuis)
- Acacia sprite (Pseudagrion acaciae)
- Pseudagrion aguessei
- Assegaai sprite (Pseudagrion assegaii)
- Pseudagrion australasiae
- Pseudagrion bernardi
- Springwater sprite (Pseudagrion caffrum)
- Orange-faced sprite (Pseudagrion camerunense)
- Yellow-faced sprite (Pseudagrion citricola)
- Catshead sprite (Pseudagrion coelestis)
- Black sprite (Pseudagrion commoniae)
- Pseudagrion cyathiforme
- Pseudagrion decorum
- Dening's sprite (Pseudagrion deningi)
- Pseudagrion divaricatum
- Mountain sprite (Pseudagrion draconis)
- Blue-faced sprite (Pseudagrion emarginatum)
- Pseudagrion epiphonematicum
- Fisher's sprite (Pseudagrion fisheri)
- Palmiet sprite (Pseudagrion furcigerum)
- Great sprite (Pseudagrion gamblesi)
- Pseudagrion gigas
- Blue-green sprite (Pseudagrion glaucescens)
- Cryptic sprite (Pseudagrion glaucoideum)
- Slender sprite (Pseudagrion glaucum)
- Pseudagrion greeni
- Painted sprite (Pseudagrion hageni)
- Swarthy sprite (Pseudagrion hamoni)
- Helena sprite (Pseudagrion helenae)
- Yellow-legged sprite (Pseudagrion hemicolon)
- Pseudagrion hypermelas
- Flame-headed riverdamsel (Pseudagrion ignifer)
- Inconspicuous sprite (Pseudagrion inconspicuum)
- Powder-faced sprite (Pseudagrion kersteni)
- Forest sprite (Pseudagrion kibalense)
- Pseudagrion laidlawi
- Pseudagrion lalakense
- Pseudagrion lindicum
- Green-striped sprite (Pseudagrion makabusiense)
- Pseudagrion malabaricum
- Pseudagrion malagasoides
- Masai sprite (Pseudagrion massaicum)
- Farmbush sprite (Pseudagrion melanicterum)
- Blue riverdamsel (Pseudagrion microcephalum)
- Nile sprite (Pseudagrion niloticum)
- Bluetail sprite (Pseudagrion nubicum)
- Pseudagrion pruinosum
- Cameroon sprite (Pseudagrion risi)
- Pseudagrion rubriceps
- Albertine sprite (Pseudagrion rufocinctum)
- Dark sprite (Pseudagrion rufostigma)
- Slate sprite (Pseudagrion salisburyense)
- Pseudagrion serrulatum
- Pseudagrion simonae
- Pseudagrion simplicilaminatum
- Variable sprite (Pseudagrion sjoestedti)
- Pseudagrion spencei
- Upland sprite (Pseudagrion spernatum)
- Cherry-eye sprite (Pseudagrion sublacteum)
- Blue-sided sprite (Pseudagrion sudanicum)
- Pseudagrion superbum
- Syrian sprite (Pseudagrion syriacum)
- Orange slimsprite (Pseudagrion thenartum)
- Wing-tailed sprite (Pseudagrion torridum)
- Vaal sprite (Pseudagrion vaalense)
- Pseudagrion williamsoni
- Large red damselfly (Pyrrhosoma nymphula)
- Rhodischnura nursei
- Schistolobos boliviensis
- Teinobasis ariel
- Teinobasis filamentum
- Teinobasis rajah
- Teinobasis samaritis
- Teinobasis superba
- Telebasis brevis
- Telebasis carmesina
- Telebasis corallina
- Telebasis demararum
- Marsh firetail (Telebasis digiticollis)
- Telebasis garleppi
- Telebasis griffinii
- Oasis firetail (Telebasis incolumis)
- Telebasis limoncocha
- Telebasis livida
- Telebasis milleri
- Selva firetail (Telebasis racenisi)
- Red-and-blue firetail (Telebasis rubricauda)
- Forcipate firetail (Telebasis versicolor)
- Telebasis willinki
- Tuberculobasis cardinalis
- Alpine redcoat damselfly (Xanthocnemis sinclairi)
- Chatham redcoat damselfly (Xanthocnemis tuanuii)
- Common redcoat damselfly (Xanthocnemis zealandica)
- Exclamation damsel (Zoniagrion exclamationis)

Subspecies

- Pele damselfly (Megalagrion amaurodytum peles)

==== Euphaeids ====
- Anisopleura comes
- Anisopleura furcata
- Anisopleura lestoides
- Anisopleura qingyuanensis
- Anisopleura subplatystyla
- Bayadera bidentata
- Bayadera continentalis
- Bayadera indica
- Bayadera melanopteryx
- Cryptophaea vietnamensis
- Dysphaea basitincta
- Dysphaea dimidiata
- Dysphaea gloriosa
- Dysphaea lugens
- Odalisque (Epallage fatime)
- Euphaea amphicyana
- Euphaea aspasia
- Euphaea bocki
- Euphaea cardinalis
- Euphaea decorata
- Euphaea dispar
- Euphaea formosa
- Euphaea fraseri
- Euphaea guerini
- Euphaea impar
- Euphaea masoni
- Euphaea ochracea
- Euphaea subcostalis
- Euphaea superba

==== Synthemistids ====
- Twinspot tigertail (Archaeosynthemis leachii)
- Variable tigertail (Eusynthemis aurolineata)
- Mountain tigertail (Eusynthemis tillyardi)
- Royal tigertail (Parasynthemis regina)
- Synthemis campioni
- Synthemis miranda
- Synthemis primigenia

==== Macromiids ====
- Regal pond cruiser (Epophthalmia elegans)
- Epophthalmia frontalis
- Epophthalmia vittata
- Epophthalmia vittigera
- Macromia amphigena
- Macromia annaimallaiensis
- Bronzed river cruiser (Macromia annulata)
- Macromia arachnomima
- Macromia bellicosa
- Macromia berlandi
- Macromia calliope
- Macromia chaiyaphumensis
- Macromia cingulata
- Macromia clio
- Macromia cupricincta
- Macromia cydippe
- Macromia ellisoni
- Macromia euterpe
- Macromia flavocolorata
- Macromia ida
- Macromia irata
- Macromia malleifera
- Macromia manchurica
- Macromia moorei
- Macromia pinratani
- Macromia unca
- Club-tailed cruiser (Macromia urania)
- Macromia westwoodii
- Phyllomacromia aeneothorax
- Phyllomacromia aequatorialis
- Sahel cruiser (Phyllomacromia africana)
- Phyllomacromia amicorum
- Golden-banded cruiser (Phyllomacromia aureozona)
- Phyllomacromia bicristulata
- Phyllomacromia bispina
- Phyllomacromia caneri
- Phyllomacromia congolica
- Two-banded cruiser (Phyllomacromia contumax)
- Phyllomacromia flavimitella
- Phyllomacromia gamblesi
- Phyllomacromia hervei
- Phyllomacromia insignis
- Crescent-faced cruiser (Phyllomacromia kimminsi)
- Phyllomacromia maesi
- Sombre cruiser (Phyllomacromia melania)
- Black cruiser (Phyllomacromia monoceros)
- Clubbed cruiser (Phyllomacromia overlaeti)
- Phyllomacromia pallidinervis
- Phyllomacromia paula
- Darting cruiser (Phyllomacromia picta)
- Western savanna cruiser (Phyllomacromia pseudafricana)
- Phyllomacromia schoutedeni
- Phyllomacromia seydeli
- Phyllomacromia sophia
- Forest cruiser (Phyllomacromia sylvatica)
- Phyllomacromia unifasciata

==== Lestids ====
- Blue damselfly (Austrolestes colensonis)
- Eastern willow spreadwing (Chalcolestes parvidens)
- Green emerald damselfly (Chalcolestes viridis)
- Indolestes cyaneus
- Indolestes gracilis
- Indolestes peregrinus
- Yellow-winged spreadwing (Lestes amicus)
- Lestes auritus
- Southern emerald damselfly (Lestes barbarus)
- Dusky spreadwing (Lestes concinnus)
- Lestes curvatus
- Lestes dichrostigma
- Cryptic spreadwing (Lestes dissimulans)
- Lestes dorothea
- Scarce emerald damselfly (Lestes dryas)
- Lestes elatus
- Lestes helix
- Lestes henshawi
- Tawny spreadwing (Lestes ictericus)
- Dark spreadwing (Lestes macrostigma)
- Lestes nodalis
- Ochre spreadwing (Lestes ochraceus)
- Pallid spreadwing (Lestes pallidus)
- Lestes paulistus
- Pinhey's spreadwing (Lestes pinheyi)
- Highland spreadwing (Lestes plagiatus)
- Lestes praemorsus
- Lestes quercifolia
- Common spreadwing (Lestes sponsa)
- Antillean spreadwing (Lestes spumarius)
- Lestes thoracicus
- Lestes tikalus
- Spotted spreadwing (Lestes tridens)
- Sickle spreadwing (Lestes uncifer)
- Lestes undulatus
- Small emerald spreadwing (Lestes virens)
- Smoky spreadwing (Lestes virgatus)
- Lestes viridulus
- Orolestes octomaculatus
- Orolestes selysi
- Orolestes wallacei
- Platylestes platystylus
- Common winter damsel (Sympecma fusca)
- Siberian winter damsel (Sympecma paedisca)

==== Aeshnids ====
- Aeschnophlebia longistigma
- Blue-eyed hawker (Aeshna affinis)
- Lancer dragonfly (Aeshna brevistyla)
- Azure hawker (Aeshna caerulea)
- Canada darner (Aeshna canadensis)
- Mottled darner (Aeshna clepsydra)
- Aeshna crenata
- Southern hawker (Aeshna cyanea)
- Brown hawker (Aeshna grandis)
- Green-eyed hawker (Aeshna isoceles)
- Common hawker (Aeshna juncea)
- Migrant hawker (Aeshna mixta)
- Aeshna ossiliensis
- Paddle-tailed darner (Aeshna palmata)
- Persephone's darner (Aeshna persephone)
- Aeshna petalura
- Baltic hawker (Aeshna serrata)
- Shadow darner (Aeshna umbrosa)
- Green hawker (Aeshna viridis)
- Shadow hawker (Afroaeschna scotias)
- Anaciaeschna donaldi
- Anaciaeschna jaspidea
- Anaciaeschna martini
- Evening hawker (Anaciaeschna triangulifera)
- Black-and-blue emperor (Anax chloromelas)
- Blue-spotted comet darner (Anax concolor)
- Dark emperor (Anax congoliath)
- Hemianax ephippiger (Anax ephippiger)
- Lesser green emperor (Anax guttatus)
- Anax immaculifrons
- Emperor (Anax imperator)
- Anax indicus
- Green darner (Anax junius)
- Comet darner (Anax longipes)
- Blue-spotted emperor (Anax nigrofasciatus)
- Anax panybeus
- Baron dragonfly (Anax papuensis)
- Lesser emperor (Anax parthenope)
- Orange emperor (Anax speratus)
- Black emperor (Anax tristis)
- Anax tumorifer
- Andaeschna rufipes
- Multi-spotted darner (Austroaeschna multipunctata)
- Southern giant darner (Austrophlebia costalis)
- Ocellated darner (Boyeria grafiana)
- Boyeria karubei
- Hairy dragonfly (Brachytron pratense)
- Eastern spectre (Caliaeschna microstigma)
- Cephalaeschna dinghuensis
- Cephalaeschna orbifrons
- Cephalaeschna viridifrons
- Blue-faced darner (Coryphaeschna adnexa)
- Coryphaeschna huaorania
- Regal darner (Coryphaeschna ingens)
- Wide-faced darner (Dendroaeschna conspersa)
- Ochre-tipped darner (Dromaeschna weiskei)
- Harlequin darner (Gomphaeschna furcillata)
- Giant duskhawker (Gynacantha africana)
- Gynacantha basiguttata
- Gynacantha bayadera
- Black-kneed duskhawker (Gynacantha bullata)
- Greater girdled duskhawker (Gynacantha cylindrata)
- Plain duskhawker (Gynacantha immaculifrons)
- Gynacantha incisura
- Little duskhawker (Gynacantha manderica)
- Gynacantha nausicaa
- Twilight darner (Gynacantha nervosa)
- Yellow-legged duskhawker (Gynacantha nigeriensis)
- Gynacantha saltatrix
- Dark-rayed duskhawker (Gynacantha sextans)
- Gynacantha subinterrupta
- Usambara duskhawker (Gynacantha usambarica)
- Lesser girdled duskhawker (Gynacantha vesiculata)
- Brown duskhawker (Gynacantha villosa)
- Gynacanthaeschna sikkima
- Heliaeschna crassa
- Blade-tipped duskhawker (Heliaeschna cynthiae)
- Black-banded duskhawker (Heliaeschna fuliginosa)
- Heliaeschna idae
- Hybrid duskhawker (Heliaeschna sembe)
- Heliaeschna simplicia
- Pale duskhawker (Heliaeschna trinervulata)
- Uganda duskhawker (Heliaeschna ugandica)
- Heliaeschna uninervulata
- Indaeschna grubaueri
- Cyrano darner (Nasiaeschna pentacantha)
- Neuraeschna harpya
- Neuraeschna titania
- Periaeschna flinti
- Periaeschna magdalena
- Periaeschna nocturnalis
- Periaeschna zhangzhouensis
- Meru hawker (Pinheyschna meruensis)
- Bullseye hawker (Pinheyschna rileyi)
- Stream hawker (Pinheyschna subpupillata)
- Planaeschna milnei
- Planaeschna risi
- Planaeschna suichangensis
- Planaeschna taiwana
- Polycanthagyna erythromelas
- Polycanthagyna melanictera
- Polycanthagyna ornithocephala
- Malachite darner (Remartinia luteipennis)
- Rhionaeschna diffinis
- Arroyo darner (Rhionaeschna dugesi)
- Rhionaeschna intricata
- Rhionaeschna peralta
- Rhionaeschna planaltica
- Sarasaeschna pryeri
- Tetracanthagyna bakeri
- Tetracanthagyna plagiata
- Tetracanthagyna waterhousei
- Caribbean darner (Triacanthagyna caribbea)
- Triacanthagyna obscuripennis
- Phantom darner (Triacanthagyna trifida)
- Triacanthagyna williamsoni
- Friendly hawker (Zosteraeschna minuscula)

==== Libellulids ====
Species

- Grizzled pintail (Acisoma panorpoides)
- Ivory pintail (Acisoma trifidum)
- Aethiothemis basilewskyi
- Aethiothemis bella
- Aethiothemis bequaerti
- Aethiothemis circe
- Aethiothemis coryndoni
- Aethiothemis ellioti
- Aethiothemis erythromelas
- Aethiothemis incongruens
- Aethiothemis palustris
- Aethiothemis solitaria
- Aethriamanta aethra
- Aethriamanta brevipennis
- Aethriamanta gracilis
- Pygmy basker (Aethriamanta rezia)
- Agrionoptera cynthiae
- Agrionoptera insignis
- Agrionoptera longitudinalis
- Agrionoptera similis
- Silver-spotted skimmer (Argyrothemis argentea)
- Atoconeura biordinata
- Atoconeura eudoxia
- Atoconeura kenya
- Western highlander (Atoconeura luxata)
- Atoconeura pseudeudoxia
- Swamp flat-tail (Austrothemis nigrescens)
- Bironides superstes
- Brachydiplax chalybea
- Brachydiplax denticauda
- Brachydiplax duivenbodei
- Brachydiplax farinosa
- Brachydiplax sobrina
- Brachygonia oculata
- Four-spotted pennant (Brachymesia gravida)
- Tawny pennant (Brachymesia herbida)
- Brachythemis contaminata
- Brachythemis impartita
- Red groundling (Brachythemis lacustris)
- Brachythemis leucosticta
- Wilson's groundling (Brachythemis wilsoni)
- Horned rock-dweller (Bradinopyga cornuta)
- Bradinopyga geminata
- Red rockdweller (Bradinopyga strachani)
- Brechmorhoga praedatrix
- Camacinia gigantea
- Camacinia othello
- Cannaphila vibex
- Red-veined pennant (Celithemis bertha)
- Calico pennant (Celithemis elisa)
- Martha's pennant (Celithemis martha)
- Inspector (Chalcostephia flavifrons)
- Chalybeothemis fluviatilis
- Cratilla lineata
- Cratilla metallica
- Crocothemis brevistigma
- Divisa scarlet (Crocothemis divisa)
- Scarlet dragonfly (Crocothemis erythraea)
- Little scarlet (Crocothemis sanguinolenta)
- Granite scarlet (Crocothemis saxicolor)
- Scarlet skimmer (Crocothemis servilia)
- Bluebolt (Cyanothemis simpsoni)
- Dasythemis mincki
- Deielia phaon
- Diastatops dimidiata
- Diastatops pullata
- Diplacina braueri
- Diplacina lisa
- Diplacina nana
- Diplacina paula
- Red percher dragonfly (Diplacodes bipunctata)
- Little percher (Diplacodes deminuta)
- Diplacodes exilis
- Black percher (Diplacodes lefebvrii)
- Barbet percher (Diplacodes luminans)
- Charcoal-winged percher (Diplacodes nebulosa)
- Dwarf percher (Diplacodes pumila)
- Diplacodes trivialis
- Checkered setwing (Dythemis fugax)
- Swift setwing (Dythemis velox)
- Sunlight firebelly (Eleuthemis buettikoferi)
- Epithemis mariae
- Erythemis carmelita
- Red pondhawk (Erythemis haematogastra)
- Claret pondhawk (Erythemis mithroides)
- Pin-tailed pondhawk (Erythemis plebeja)
- Eastern pondhawk (Erythemis simplicicollis)
- Great pondhawk (Erythemis vesiculosa)
- Erythrodiplax andagoya
- Erythrodiplax cleopatra
- Erythrodiplax fulva
- Erythrodiplax ines
- Erythrodiplax juliana
- Erythrodiplax leticia
- Erythrodiplax lygaea
- Erythrodiplax maculosa
- Erythrodiplax ochracea
- Erythrodiplax pallida
- Erythrodiplax paraguayensis
- White-eyed skimmer (Fylgia amazonica)
- Tiny sylph (Gynothemis pumila)
- Saddled jungleskimmer (Hadrothemis camarensis)
- Robust jungleskimmer (Hadrothemis coacta)
- Scarlet jungleskimmer (Hadrothemis defecta)
- Slender jungleskimmer (Hadrothemis infesta)
- Red jungle-skimmer (Hadrothemis scabrifrons)
- Variable jungleskimmer (Hadrothemis versuta)
- Hadrothemis vrijdaghi
- Hemistigma affine
- African pied-spot (Hemistigma albipunctum)
- Huonia arborophila
- Huonia thais
- Hydrobasileus croceus
- Hylaeothemis clementia
- Indothemis carnatica
- Indothemis limbata
- Scarlet grenadier (Lathrecista asiatica)
- Dark whiteface (Leucorrhinia albifrons)
- Lilypad whiteface (Leucorrhinia caudalis)
- White-faced darter (Leucorrhinia dubia)
- Frosted whiteface (Leucorrhinia frigida)
- Crimson-ringed whiteface (Leucorrhinia glacialis)
- Large white-faced darter (Leucorrhinia pectoralis)
- Comanche skimmer (Libellula comanche)
- Neon skimmer (Libellula croceipennis)
- Spangled skimmer (Libellula cyanea)
- Broad-bodied chaser (Libellula depressa)
- Libellula foliata
- Scarce chaser (Libellula fulva)
- Widow skimmer (Libellula luctuosa)
- Libellula melli
- Four-spotted chaser (Libellula quadrimaculata)
- Lyriothemis biappendiculata
- Lyriothemis bivittata
- Lyriothemis cleis
- Lyriothemis elegantissima
- Lyriothemis magnificata
- Lyriothemis meyeri
- Wide-bellied skimmer (Lyriothemis pachygastra)
- Lyriothemis tricolor
- Cora's pennant (Macrodiplax cora)
- Macrothemis brevidens
- Antillean sylph (Macrothemis celeno)
- Macrothemis flavescens
- Macrothemis hahneli
- Macrothemis hemichlora
- Macrothemis heteronycha
- Macrothemis idalia
- Straw-colored sylph (Macrothemis inacuta)
- Macrothemis lauriana
- Macrothemis tenuis
- Ringed leaftipper (Malgassophlebia bispina)
- Hyacinth glider (Miathyria marcella)
- Artemis dasher (Micrathyria artemis)
- Black dasher (Micrathyria atra)
- Blue-tipped dasher (Micrathyria caerulistyla)
- Micrathyria catenata
- Caribbean dasher (Micrathyria dissocians)
- Forest dasher (Micrathyria hippolyte)
- Micrathyria longifasciata
- Micrathyria schumanni
- Micrathyria spinifera
- Micrathyria spuria
- Micrathyria stawiarskii
- Micrathyria sympriona
- Pale-footed dasher (Micrathyria tibialis)
- Stream micmac (Micromacromia camerunica)
- Small micmac (Micromacromia zygoptera)
- Misagria bimacula
- Nannophlebia anatya
- Common archtail (Nannophlebia risi)
- Eastern pygmyfly (Nannophya dalei)
- Western pygmyfly (Nannophya occidentalis)
- Scarlet dwarf (Nannophya pygmaea)
- Nannophyopsis clara
- Neodythemis afra
- Neodythemis campioni
- Neodythemis klingi
- Neodythemis preussi
- Stripe-fronted dryad (Nephepeltia leonardina)
- Spine-bellied dryad (Nephepeltia phryne)
- Eastern blacktail (Nesciothemis farinosa)
- Nesciothemis fitzgeraldi
- Small blacktail (Nesciothemis minor)
- Northern redtail (Nesciothemis nigeriensis)
- Western blacktail (Nesciothemis pujoli)
- Nesoxenia lineata
- Neurothemis fluctuans
- Neurothemis fulvia
- Neurothemis intermedia
- Neurothemis ramburii
- Neurothemis terminata
- Neurothemis tullia
- Eastern forestwatcher (Notiothemis jonesi)
- Western forestwatcher (Notiothemis robertsi)
- Oligoclada abbreviata
- Oligoclada monosticha
- Oligoclada teretidentis
- Bottletail (Olpogastra lugubris)
- Onychothemis culminicola
- Onychothemis testacea
- Orchithemis pruinans
- Orchithemis pulcherrima
- Yellow-lined skimmer (Orthemis biolleyi)
- Concolored skimmer (Orthemis concolor)
- Roseate skimmer (Orthemis ferruginea)
- Orthemis nodiplaga
- Regal skimmer (Orthemis regalis)
- Orthemis sulphurata
- Orthemis tambopatae
- Abbott's skimmer (Orthetrum abbotti)
- Orthetrum africanum
- White-tailed skimmer (Orthetrum albistylum)
- Many-celled skimmer (Orthetrum angustiventre)
- Giant skimmer (Orthetrum austeni)
- Orthetrum azureum
- Speckled skimmer (Orthetrum balteatum)
- Banded skimmer (Orthetrum brachiale)
- Southern skimmer (Orthetrum brunneum)
- Two-striped skimmer (Orthetrum caffrum)
- One-spriped skimmer (Orthetrum camerunense)
- Black-tailed skimmer (Orthetrum cancellatum)
- Orthetrum chrysis
- Epaulet skimmer (Orthetrum chrysostigma)
- Keeled skimmer (Orthetrum coerulescens)
- Orthetrum glaucum
- Guinea skimmer (Orthetrum guineense)
- Dark-shouldered skimmer (Orthetrum hintzi)
- Spectacled skimmer (Orthetrum icteromelas)
- Orthetrum japonicum
- Julia skimmer (Orthetrum julia)
- Orthetrum kollmannspergeri
- Orthetrum kristenseni
- Orthetrum latihami
- Orthetrum lineostigma
- Orthetrum luzonicum
- Highland skimmer (Orthetrum machadoi)
- Orthetrum macrostigma
- Orthetrum melania
- Farmbush skimmer (Orthetrum microstigma)
- Rosy skimmer (Orthetrum migratum)
- Woodland skimmer (Orthetrum monardi)
- Orthetrum pruinosum
- Ransonnet's skimmer (Orthetrum ransonnetii)
- Robust skimmer (Orthetrum robustum)
- Slender skimmer (Orthetrum sabina)
- Orthetrum saegeri
- Green skimmer (Orthetrum serapia)
- Bold skimmer (Orthetrum stemmale)
- Small skimmer (Orthetrum taeniolatum)
- Orthetrum testaceum
- Orthetrum triangulare
- Long skimmer (Orthetrum trinacria)
- Pepperpants (Oxythemis phoenicosceles)
- Palpopleura albifrons
- Deceptive widow (Palpopleura deceptor)
- Yellow-veined widow (Palpopleura jucunda)
- Lucia widow (Palpopleura lucia)
- Portia widow (Palpopleura portia)
- Palpopleura sexmaculata
- Palpopleura vestita
- Wandering glider (Pantala flavescens)
- Banded duskdarter (Parazyxomma flavicans)
- Orange amberwing (Perithemis cornelia)
- Slough amberwing (Perithemis domitia)
- Golden amberwing (Perithemis electra)
- Perithemis icteroptera
- Fine-banded amberwing (Perithemis lais)
- Clear-tipped amberwing (Perithemis parzefalli)
- Ruby amberwing (Perithemis rubita)
- Scarlet spiderlegs (Planiplax arachne)
- Planiplax erythropyga
- Porpax asperipes
- Porpax bipunctus
- Porpax garambensis
- Porpax risi
- Porpax sentipes
- Swampwatcher (Potamarcha congener)
- Protorthemis woodfordi
- Pseudothemis jorina
- Pied skimmer (Pseudothemis zonata)
- Cardinal redskimmer (Rhodopygia cardinalis)
- Rhodopygia hinei
- Slender redskimmer (Rhodopygia hollandi)
- Rhodothemis rufa
- Rhyothemis apicalis
- Rhyothemis aterrima
- Rhyothemis cognata
- Skylight flutterer (Rhyothemis fenestrina)
- Rhyothemis fuliginosa
- Mariposa flutterer (Rhyothemis mariposa)
- Veiled flutterer (Rhyothemis notata)
- Rhyothemis obsolescens
- Yellow-striped flutterer (Rhyothemis variegata)
- Rhyothemis plutonia
- Sapphire flutterer (Rhyothemis princeps)
- Phantom flutterer (Rhyothemis semihyalina)
- Rhyothemis triangularis
- Risiophlebia dohrni
- Black pennant (Selysiothemis nigra)
- Blue-faced meadowhawk (Sympetrum ambiguum)
- Sympetrum arenicolor
- Sympetrum baccha
- Sympetrum commixtum
- Sympetrum darwinianum
- Sympetrum eroticum
- Yellow-winged darter (Sympetrum flaveolum)
- Red-veined darter (Sympetrum fonscolombii)
- Sympetrum haematoneura
- Dwarf darter (Sympetrum haritonovi)
- Sympetrum hypomelas
- Cardinal meadowhawk (Sympetrum illotum)
- Sympetrum infuscatum
- Cherry-faced meadowhawk (Sympetrum internum)
- Red-veined meadowhawk (Sympetrum madidum)
- Southern darter (Sympetrum meridionale)
- Island darter (Sympetrum nigrifemur)
- Talamanca meadowhawk (Sympetrum nigrocreatum)
- Sympetrum parvulum
- Banded darter (Sympetrum pedemontanum)
- Ruddy darter (Sympetrum sanguineum)
- Desert darter (Sympetrum sinaiticum)
- Common darter (Sympetrum striolatum)
- Vagrant darter (Sympetrum vulgatum)
- Forest elf (Tetrathemis camerunensis)
- Club-tailed elfe (Tetrathemis corduliformis)
- Tetrathemis godiardi
- Rainforest elf (Tetrathemis irregularis)
- Tetrathemis longfieldae
- Tetrathemis platyptera
- Black-splashed elf (Tetrathemis polleni)
- Dash-winged piedface (Thermochoria equivocata)
- Clear-winged piedface (Thermochoria jeanneli)
- Thermorthemis madagascariensis
- Old world twister (Tholymis tillarga)
- Keyhole glider (Tramea basilaris)
- Striped saddlebags (Tramea calverti)
- Carolina saddlebags (Tramea carolina)
- Ferruginous glider (Tramea limbata)
- Tramea loewii
- Red-mantled saddlebags (Tramea onusta)
- Tramea rustica
- Red glider dragonfly (Tramea transmarina)
- Tramea virginia
- Halfshade dropwing (Trithemis aconita)
- Bronze dropwing (Trithemis aenea)
- Western phantom dropwing (Trithemis africana)
- Violet dropwing (Trithemis annulata)
- Trithemis anomala
- Trithemis apicalis
- Red-veined dropwing (Trithemis arteriosa)
- Crimson marsh glider (Trithemis aurora)
- Trithemis basitincta
- Trithemis bifida
- Trithemis bredoi
- Trithemis congolica
- Trithemis dejouxi
- Black dropwing (Trithemis dichroa)
- Denim dropwing (Trithemis donaldsoni)
- Highland dropwing (Trithemis dorsalis)
- Trithemis dubia
- Trithemis ellenbeckii
- Black stream glider (Trithemis festiva)
- Navy dropwing (Trithemis furva)
- Trithemis grouti
- Silhouette dropwing (Trithemis hecate)
- Copycat dropwing (Trithemis imitata)
- Albertine dropwing (Trithemis integra)
- Trithemis kalula
- Orange-winged dropwing (Trithemis kirbyi)
- Trithemis leakeyi
- Trithemis lilacina
- Trithemis longistyla
- Monard's dropwing (Trithemis monardi)
- Hairy-legged dropwing (Trithemis nuptialis)
- Long-legged marsh glider (Trithemis pallidinervis)
- Russet dropwing (Trithemis pluvialis)
- Cobalt dropwing (Trithemis pruinata)
- Jaunty dropwing (Trithemis stictica)
- Eastern phantom dropwing (Trithemis tropicana)
- Elegant dropwing (Trithemis werneri)
- Trithetrum congoense
- Fiery darter (Trithetrum navasi)
- Tyriobapta torrida
- Red basker (Urothemis assignata)
- Blue basker (Urothemis edwardsii)
- Urothemis signata
- Rainforest bluewing (Zenithoptera fasciata)
- Zenithoptera viola
- Zygonoides fraseri
- Southern riverking (Zygonoides fuelleborni)
- Zygonoides occidentis
- Zygonyx asahinai
- Zygonyx atritibiae
- Zygonyx chrysobaphes
- Zygonyx elisabethae
- Zygonyx eusebia
- Ensign cascader (Zygonyx flavicosta)
- Zygonyx geminunca
- Zygonyx ida
- Zygonyx iris
- Blue cascader (Zygonyx natalensis)
- Regal cascader (Zygonyx regisalberti)
- Zygonyx speciosus
- Zygonyx takasago
- Ringed cascader (Zygonyx torridus)
- Smoky duskdarter (Zyxomma atlanticum)
- Zyxomma multinervinervis
- Long-tailed duskdarter (Zyxomma petiolatum)

Subspecies

- Acisoma panorpoides ascalaphoides
- Orthetrum coerulescens anceps
- Orthetrum julia falsum

==== Polythorids ====
- Glitterwing (Chalcopteryx rutilans)
- Tepui bannerwing (Chalcothore montgomeryi)
- Black-banded bannerwing (Cora aurea)
- Cora irene
- Cora jocosa
- Cora klenei
- Cora marina
- Cora terminalis
- Euthore fassli
- Euthore fastigiata
- Euthore meridana
- Polythore aurora
- Polythore boliviana
- Polythore concinna
- Polythore derivata
- Polythore lamerceda
- Polythore manua
- Polythore mutata
- Polythore ornata
- Polythore spaeteri
- Polythore terminata
- Polythore victoria

==== Other Odonata species ====
- Devadatta argyoides
- Devadatta cyanocephala
- Devadatta ducatrix
- Tropical rockmaster (Diphlebia euphoeoides)
- Whitewater rockmaster (Diphlebia lestoides)
- Gomphomacromia fallax
- White-dotted redspot (Hypopetalia pestilens)
- Idionyx carinata
- Idionyx claudia
- Idionyx iida
- Idionyx intricata
- Idionyx philippa
- Idionyx rhinoceroides
- Idionyx selysi
- Idionyx stevensi
- Idionyx thailandica
- Idomacromia lieftincki
- Idomacromia proavita
- Isosticta spinipes
- Macromidia donaldi
- Macromidia genialis
- Macromidia ishidai
- Macromidia kelloggi
- Macromidia rapida
- Macromidia samal
- Forest mosquitohawk (Micromidia atrifrons)
- Neophya rutherfordi
- Chilean petaltail (Phenes raptor)
- Philoganga montana
- Ochre titan (Philoganga vetusta)
- Narrow-flanged redspot (Phyllopetalia apicalis)
- Apollo redspot (Phyllopetalia apollo)
- Pudu redspot (Phyllopetalia pudu)
- Northern wiretail (Rhadinosticta banksi)
- Pantepui relict damsel (Rimanella arcana)
- Gray petaltail (Tachopteryx thoreyi)
- Tanymecosticta fissicollis
- Bush giant dragonfly (Uropetala carovei)
- Mountain giant dragonfly (Uropetala chiltoni)

== See also ==
- Lists of IUCN Red List least concern species
- List of near threatened arthropods
- List of vulnerable arthropods
- List of endangered arthropods
- List of critically endangered arthropods
- List of recently extinct arthropods
- List of data deficient arthropods
