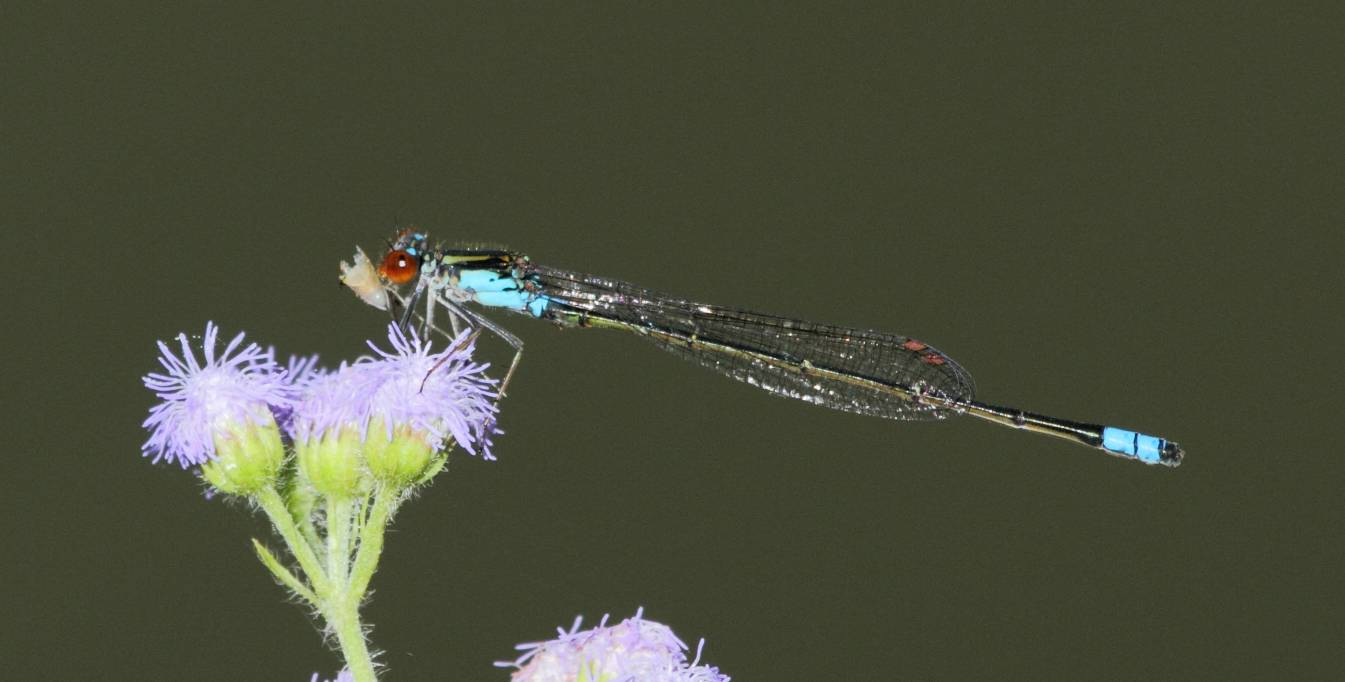
- Male

Conservation status
- Least Concern (IUCN 3.1)

Scientific classification
- Kingdom: Animalia
- Phylum: Arthropoda
- Clade: Pancrustacea
- Class: Insecta
- Order: Odonata
- Suborder: Zygoptera
- Family: Coenagrionidae
- Genus: Pseudagrion
- Species: P. sudanicum

Binomial name
- Pseudagrion sudanicum Le Roi, 1915

= Pseudagrion sudanicum =

Blue-sided sprite

Species of damselfly

Pseudagrion sudanicum, the blue-sided sprite is a species of damselfly in the family Coenagrionidae. It is found in Botswana, the Democratic Republic of the Congo, Gambia, Ghana, Malawi, Mozambique, Namibia, Nigeria, South Africa, Sudan, Uganda, Zambia, and Zimbabwe. Its natural habitats are intermittent rivers and freshwater marshes.

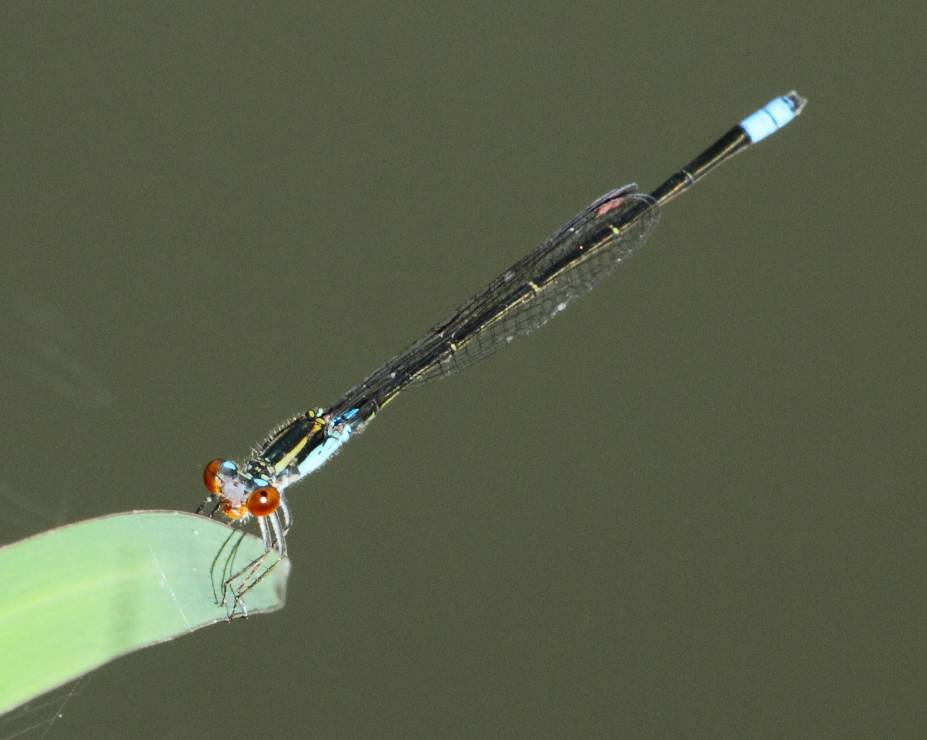
Male

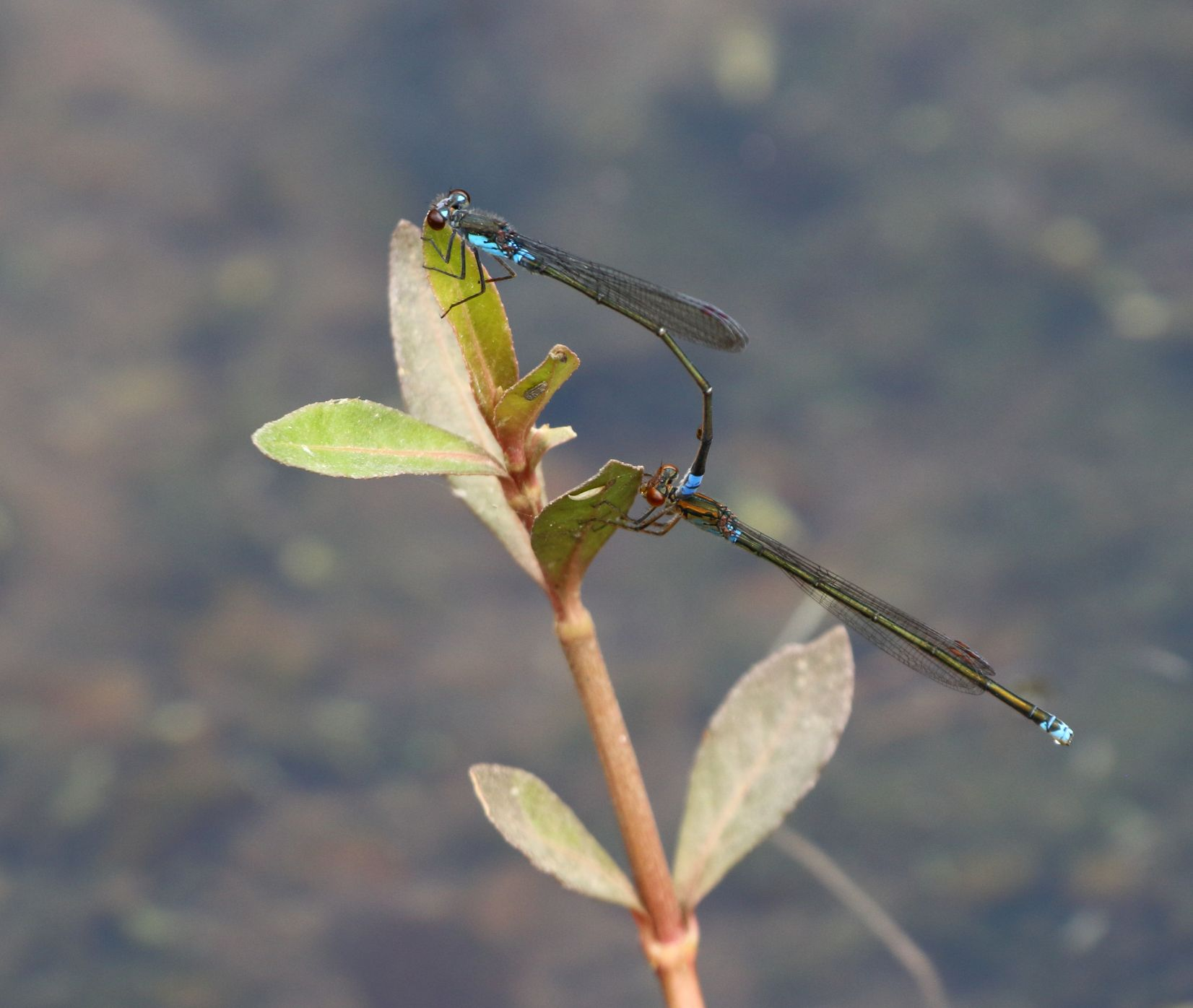
Mating pair

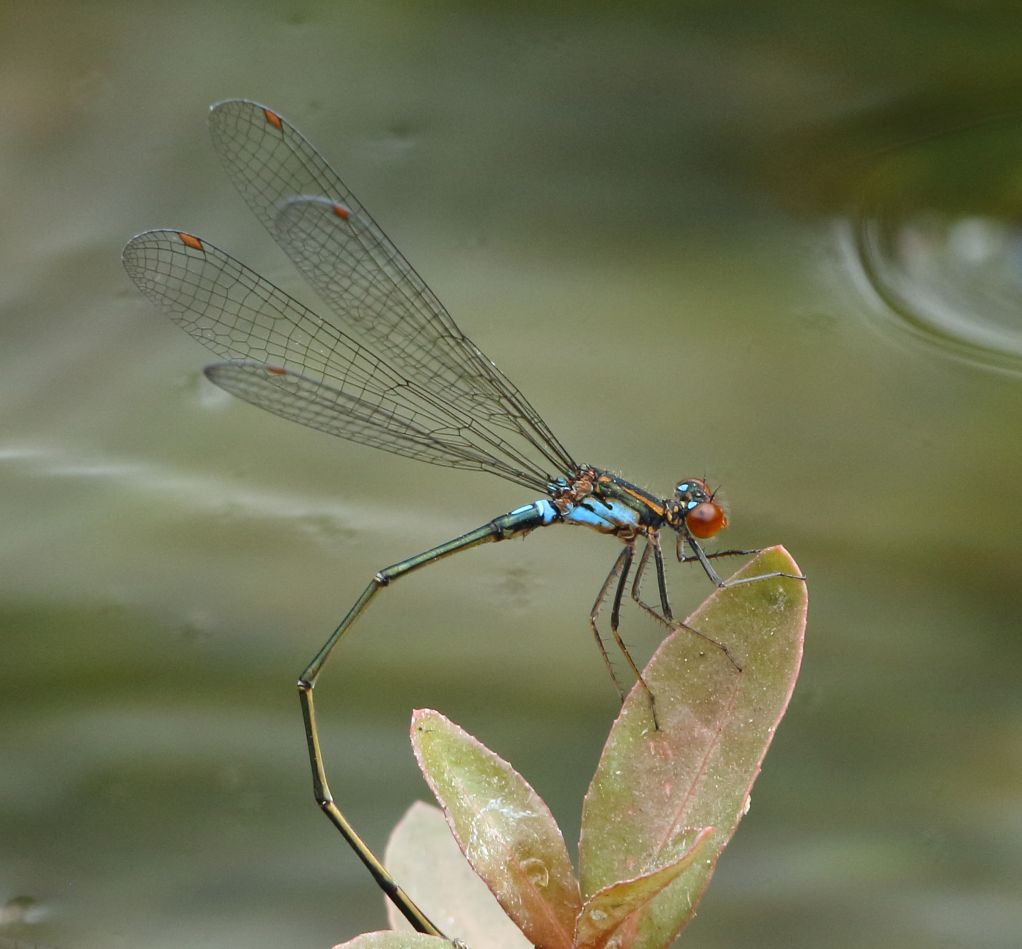
Male

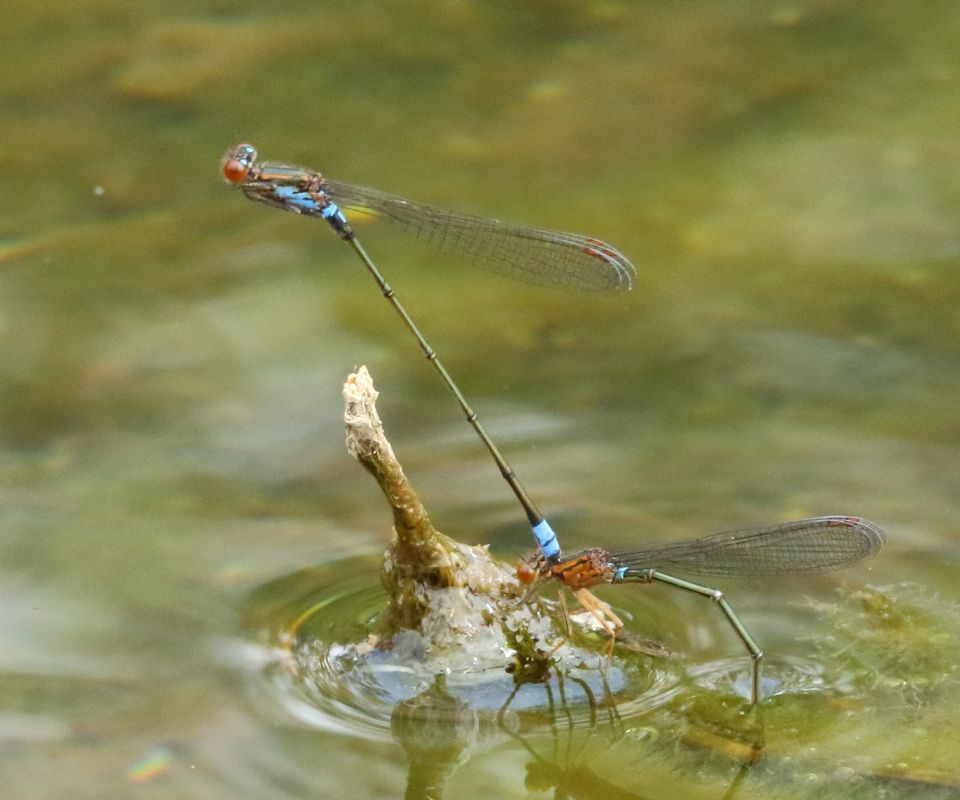
Pair; female ovipositing
