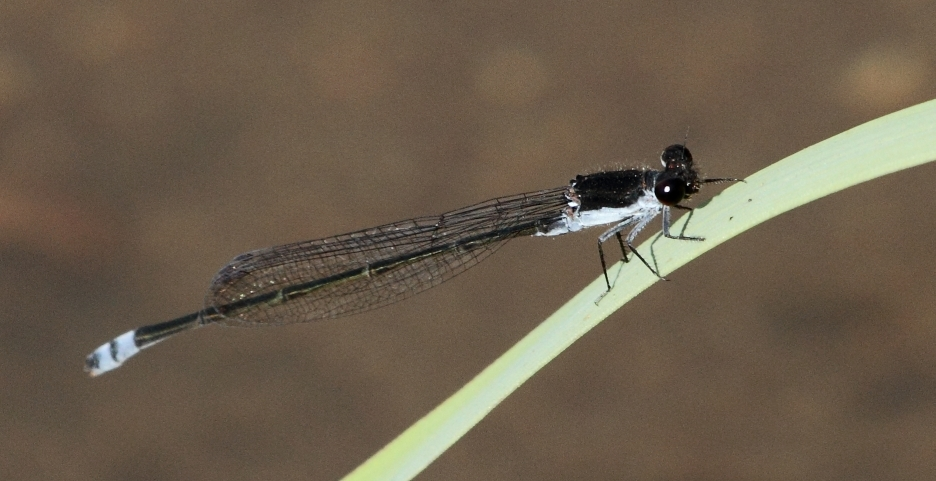
- Male

Conservation status
- Least Concern (IUCN 3.1)

Scientific classification
- Kingdom: Animalia
- Phylum: Arthropoda
- Clade: Pancrustacea
- Class: Insecta
- Order: Odonata
- Suborder: Zygoptera
- Family: Coenagrionidae
- Genus: Pseudagrion
- Species: P. commoniae

Binomial name
- Pseudagrion commoniae (Förster, 1902)

= Pseudagrion commoniae =

Species of damselfly

Pseudagrion commoniae, the black sprite, is a species of damselfly in the family Coenagrionidae.

== Distribution and status ==
This species is found in eastern Africa, from South Africa to Ethiopia.

== Habitat ==
The black sprite is found in and near streams and rivers in wooded country.
