= Pseudagrion glaucescens =

Conservation status
- Least Concern (IUCN 3.1)

Scientific classification
- Kingdom: Animalia
- Phylum: Arthropoda
- Clade: Pancrustacea
- Class: Insecta
- Order: Odonata
- Suborder: Zygoptera
- Family: Coenagrionidae
- Genus: Pseudagrion
- Species: P. glaucescens

Binomial name
- Pseudagrion glaucescens Selys, 1876

Species of damselfly

Pseudagrion glaucescens is a species of damselfly in the family Coenagrionidae. It is found in Angola, Benin, Botswana, Burkina Faso, Cameroon, Chad, Ivory Coast, Gambia, Ghana, Guinea, Kenya, Liberia, Malawi, Mozambique, Namibia, Nigeria, Senegal, Sierra Leone, Tanzania, Togo, Uganda, Zambia, Zimbabwe, and possibly Burundi. Its natural habitats are dry savanna, moist savanna, subtropical or tropical dry shrubland, subtropical or tropical moist shrubland, and rivers.
