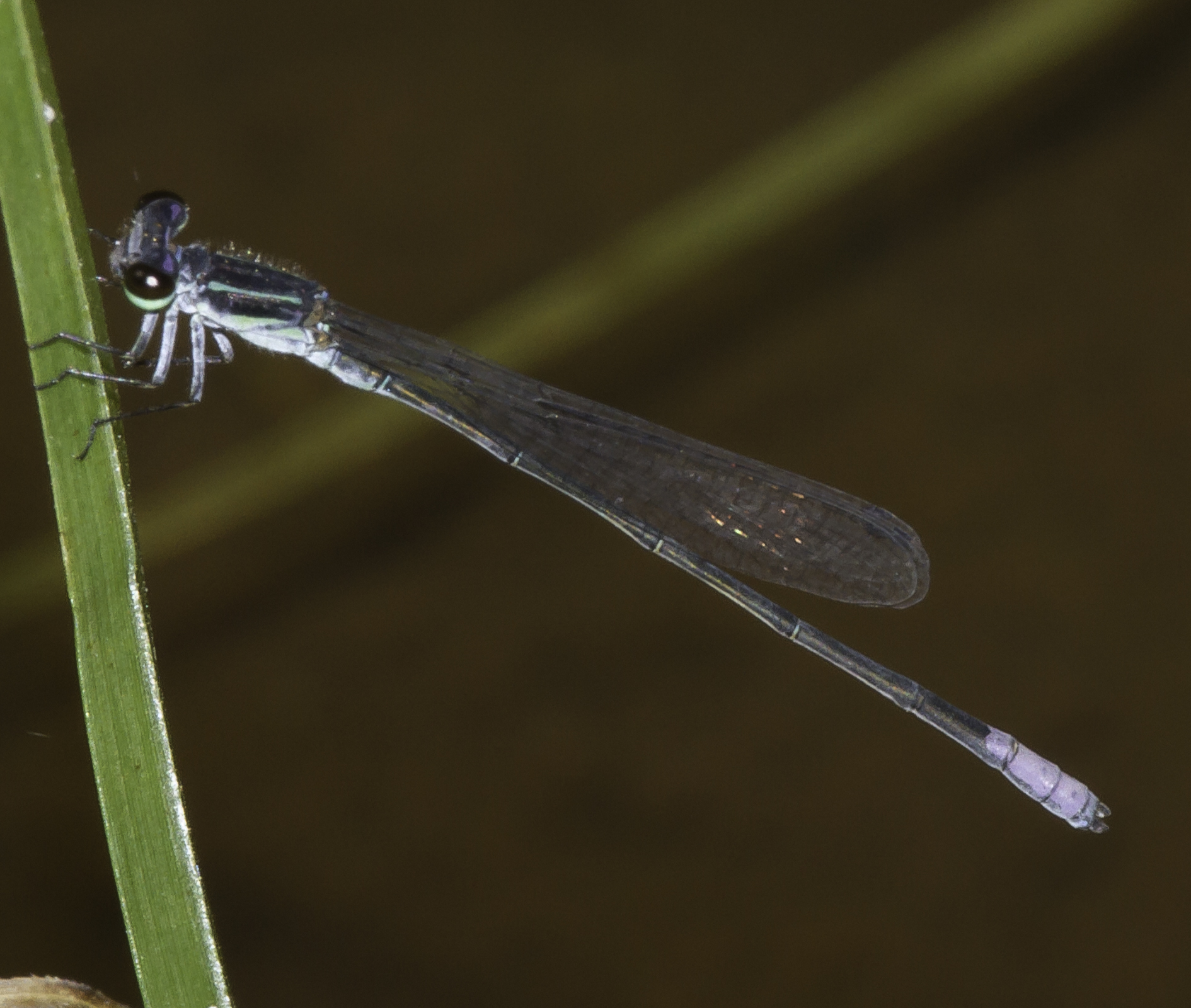
- Male on perch

Conservation status
- Least Concern (IUCN 3.1)

Scientific classification
- Kingdom: Animalia
- Phylum: Arthropoda
- Clade: Pancrustacea
- Class: Insecta
- Order: Odonata
- Suborder: Zygoptera
- Family: Coenagrionidae
- Genus: Pseudagrion
- Species: P. makabusiense

Binomial name
- Pseudagrion makabusiense Pinhey, 1950

= Pseudagrion makabusiense =

Species of damselfly

Pseudagrion makabusiense, the green-striped sprite or Makabusi sprite, is a species of damselfly in the family Coenagrionidae.

== Description ==
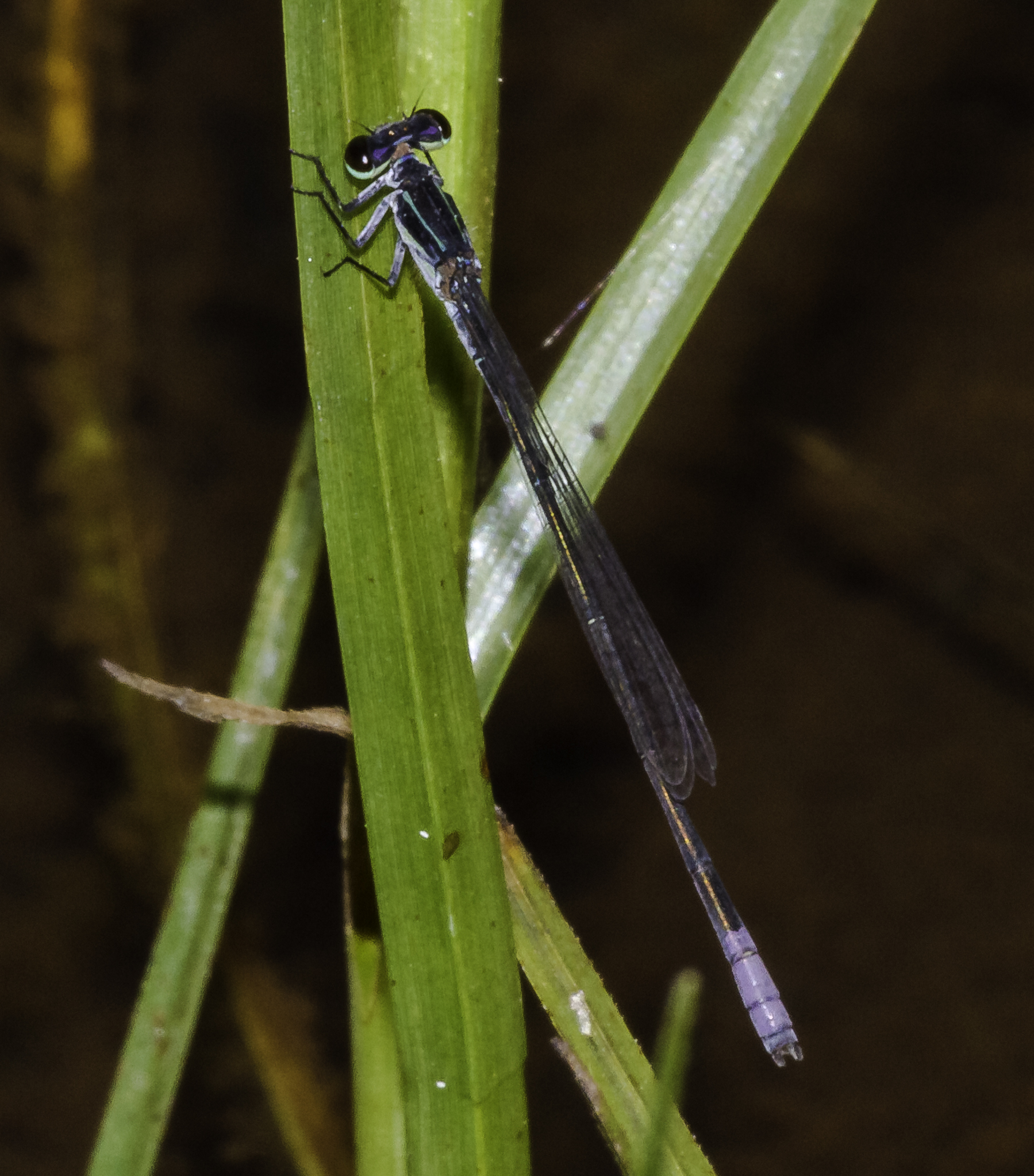
Male, top view

The green-striped sprite is small and slender. Its face is lilac with lilac wedge-shaped postocular spots behind eyes that are dark brown above and green below. The synthorax is black with thin green antehumeral stripes. The abdomen is black with green metallic sheen, pale green below and with a violet end (segment 7 – 9) terminating in a black tip (sometimes slightly pruinescent).

== Distribution and habitat ==
The species is found in Eastern Africa, South Africa, the Democratic Republic of the Congo, Mozambique, South Africa, Zambia, Zimbabwe and possibly Central Africa. It prefers streams and slow rivers with vegetation of rushes and long grasses and partial canopy in savanna landscapes.

== Conservation ==
While the green-striped sprite is widely distributed and apparently common throughout much of its range, it is believed to be under some pressure in South Africa from the degradation of riparian zones and the proliferation of invasive plant species.
