= Pseudagrion sjoestedti =

Conservation status
- Least Concern (IUCN 3.1)

Scientific classification
- Kingdom: Animalia
- Phylum: Arthropoda
- Clade: Pancrustacea
- Class: Insecta
- Order: Odonata
- Suborder: Zygoptera
- Family: Coenagrionidae
- Genus: Pseudagrion
- Species: P. sjoestedti

Binomial name
- Pseudagrion sjoestedti Förster, 1906

Species of damselfly

Pseudagrion sjoestedti is a species of damselfly in the family Coenagrionidae. It is found in Angola, Benin, Botswana, Cameroon, Central African Republic, the Democratic Republic of the Congo, Ivory Coast, Equatorial Guinea, Gambia, Ghana, Kenya, Liberia, Malawi, Mali, Mozambique, Namibia, Nigeria, Sierra Leone, South Africa, Tanzania, Togo, Uganda, Zambia, Zimbabwe, and possibly Burundi. Its natural habitats are subtropical or tropical moist lowland forests, subtropical or tropical dry shrubland, subtropical or tropical moist shrubland, and rivers.
