= Pseudagrion coeruleipunctum =

Conservation status
- Least Concern (IUCN 3.1)

Scientific classification
- Kingdom: Animalia
- Phylum: Arthropoda
- Clade: Pancrustacea
- Class: Insecta
- Order: Odonata
- Suborder: Zygoptera
- Family: Coenagrionidae
- Genus: Pseudagrion
- Species: P. coeruleipunctum

Binomial name
- Pseudagrion coeruleipunctum Pinhey, 1964

Species of damselfly

Pseudagrion coeruleipunctum is a species of damselfly in the family Coenagrionidae. It is found in Angola and Zambia. Its natural habitats are rivers and swamps.
