= Pseudagrion helenae =

Conservation status
- Least Concern (IUCN 3.1)

Scientific classification
- Kingdom: Animalia
- Phylum: Arthropoda
- Clade: Pancrustacea
- Class: Insecta
- Order: Odonata
- Suborder: Zygoptera
- Family: Coenagrionidae
- Genus: Pseudagrion
- Species: P. helenae

Binomial name
- Pseudagrion helenae Balinsky, 1964

Species of damselfly

Pseudagrion helenae is a species of damselfly in the family Coenagrionidae. It is found in Botswana, Malawi, and Zambia. Its natural habitats are swamps, freshwater marshes, and intermittent freshwater marshes. It is threatened by habitat loss.
