= Pseudagrion kaffinum =

Conservation status
- Vulnerable (IUCN 3.1)

Scientific classification
- Kingdom: Animalia
- Phylum: Arthropoda
- Clade: Pancrustacea
- Class: Insecta
- Order: Odonata
- Suborder: Zygoptera
- Family: Coenagrionidae
- Genus: Pseudagrion
- Species: P. kaffinum

Binomial name
- Pseudagrion kaffinum Consiglio, 1978

Species of damselfly

Pseudagrion kaffinum is a species of damselfly in the family Coenagrionidae. It is endemic to Ethiopia. Its natural habitat is rivers. Commonly known as the Kaffa Sprite. Lives along slow flowing water with nearby mud and grass. Lives at altitudes of 1,600–1,800 m (5,200–5,900 ft) above sea level.
