= Pseudagrion niloticum =

Conservation status
- Least Concern (IUCN 3.1)

Scientific classification
- Kingdom: Animalia
- Phylum: Arthropoda
- Clade: Pancrustacea
- Class: Insecta
- Order: Odonata
- Suborder: Zygoptera
- Family: Coenagrionidae
- Genus: Pseudagrion
- Species: P. niloticum

Binomial name
- Pseudagrion niloticum Dumont, 1978

Species of damselfly

Pseudagrion niloticum is a species of damselfly in the family Coenagrionidae. It is found in Egypt, Ethiopia, Kenya, Somalia, Sudan, and possibly Uganda. Its natural habitats are dry savanna, moist savanna, subtropical or tropical dry shrubland, subtropical or tropical moist shrubland, and rivers.
