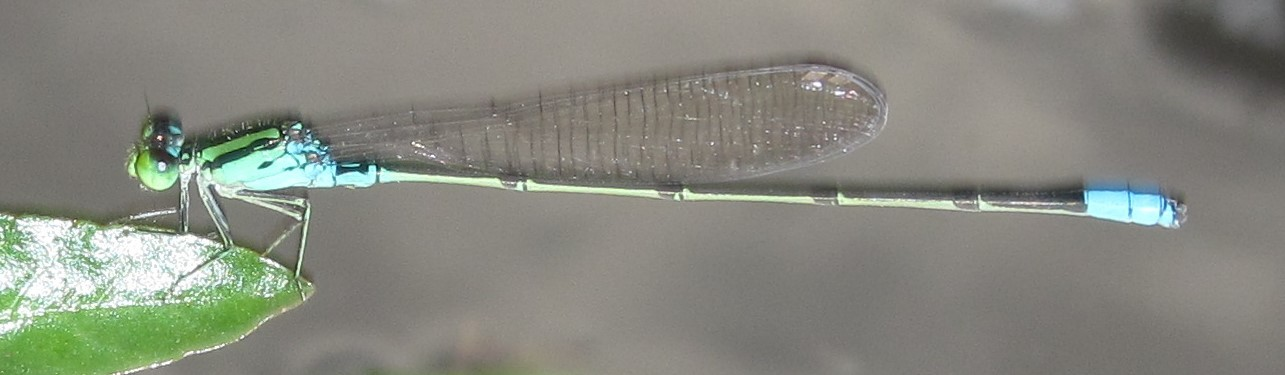
- Male, Botswana

Conservation status
- Least Concern (IUCN 3.1)

Scientific classification
- Kingdom: Animalia
- Phylum: Arthropoda
- Clade: Pancrustacea
- Class: Insecta
- Order: Odonata
- Suborder: Zygoptera
- Family: Coenagrionidae
- Genus: Pseudagrion
- Species: P. nubicum

Binomial name
- Pseudagrion nubicum Selys, 1876

= Pseudagrion nubicum =

Species of damselfly

Pseudagrion nubicum, also known as the Bluetail Sprite, is a species of damselfly in the family Coenagrionidae. It is found in Benin, Botswana, Burkina Faso, Cameroon, Chad, the Democratic Republic of the Congo, Ivory Coast, Egypt, Ethiopia, Gambia, Ghana, Kenya, Malawi, Mali, Namibia, Niger, Nigeria, Senegal, Sierra Leone, Sudan, Tanzania, Togo, Uganda, Zambia, Zimbabwe, and possibly Burundi. Its natural habitats are swamps, freshwater lakes, intermittent freshwater lakes, freshwater marshes, and intermittent freshwater marshes.
