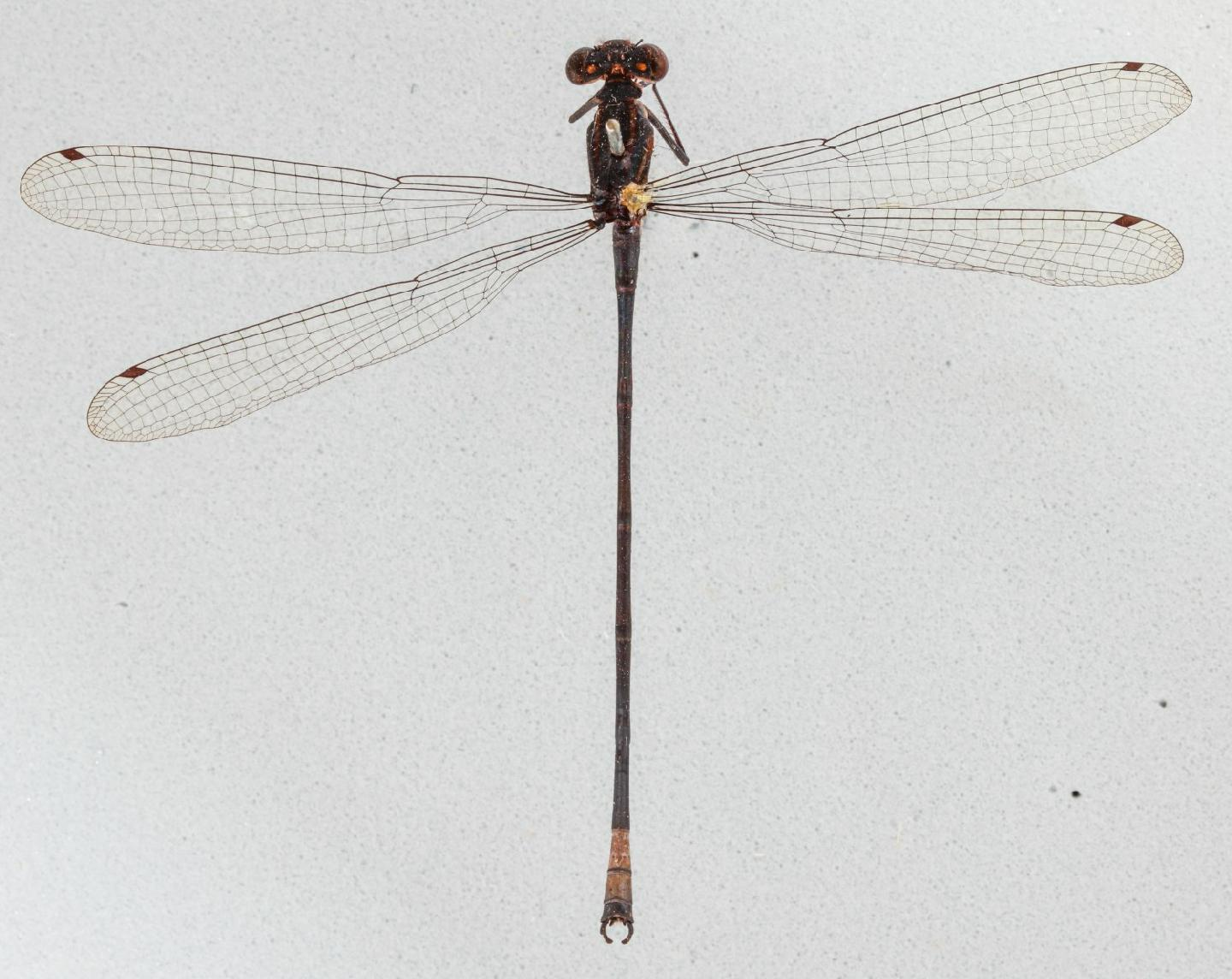

Conservation status
- Vulnerable (IUCN 3.1)

Scientific classification
- Kingdom: Animalia
- Phylum: Arthropoda
- Clade: Pancrustacea
- Class: Insecta
- Order: Odonata
- Suborder: Zygoptera
- Family: Coenagrionidae
- Genus: Pseudagrion
- Species: P. bicoerulans

Binomial name
- Pseudagrion bicoerulans Martin, 1907

= Pseudagrion bicoerulans =

Species of damselfly

Pseudagrion bicoerulans is a species of damselfly in the family Coenagrionidae. It is found in Kenya, Tanzania, and Uganda. Its natural habitats are subtropical or tropical moist montane forests, subtropical or tropical high-altitude grassland, and rivers. It is threatened by habitat loss.
