= Pseudagrion rufocinctum =

Conservation status
- Least Concern (IUCN 3.1)

Scientific classification
- Kingdom: Animalia
- Phylum: Arthropoda
- Clade: Pancrustacea
- Class: Insecta
- Order: Odonata
- Suborder: Zygoptera
- Family: Coenagrionidae
- Genus: Pseudagrion
- Species: P. rufocinctum

Binomial name
- Pseudagrion rufocinctum Pinhey, 1956

Species of damselfly

Pseudagrion rufocinctum is a species of damselfly in the family Coenagrionidae. It is found in the Democratic Republic of the Congo, Tanzania, and Uganda. Its natural habitats are subtropical or tropical moist lowland forests and freshwater springs. It is threatened by habitat loss.
