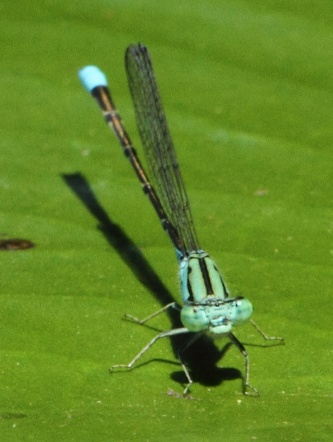
- Male

Conservation status
- Least Concern (IUCN 3.1)

Scientific classification
- Kingdom: Animalia
- Phylum: Arthropoda
- Clade: Pancrustacea
- Class: Insecta
- Order: Odonata
- Suborder: Zygoptera
- Family: Coenagrionidae
- Genus: Pseudagrion
- Species: P. coeleste

Binomial name
- Pseudagrion coeleste Longfield, 1947

Synonyms
- Pseudagrion coelestis Longfield 1947 (missp.); Pseudagrion samfyae Pinhey, 1964

= Pseudagrion coeleste =

Species of damselfly

Pseudagrion coeleste (catshead sprite) is a species of damselfly in family Coenagrionidae.

== Distribution ==
Found in Angola, Botswana, Malawi, Namibia, South Africa, Zambia, Zimbabwe.

== Habitat ==
Pseudagrion coeleste favours freshwater marshes and pools with emergent vegetation.

== Gallery ==
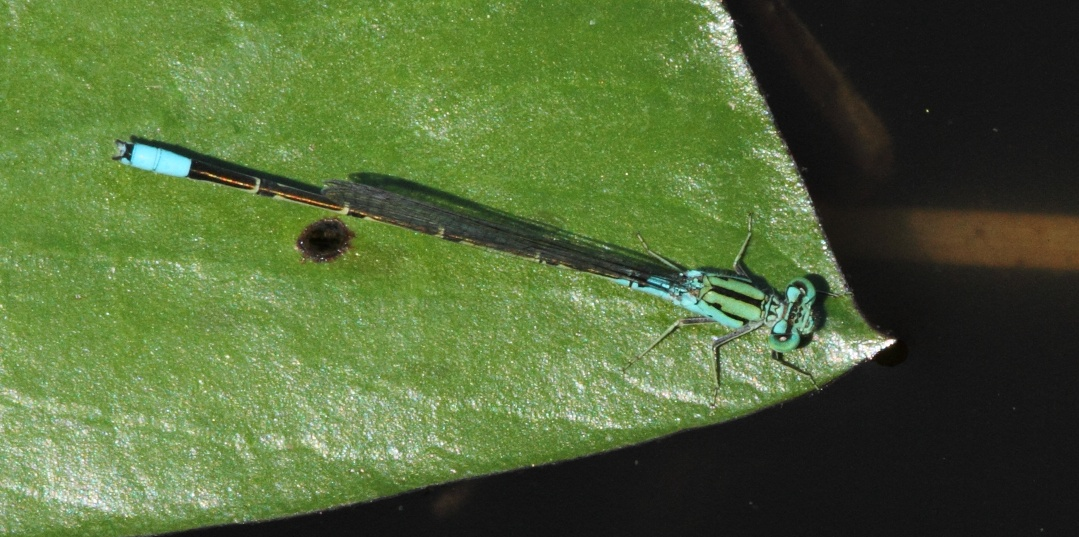
Male

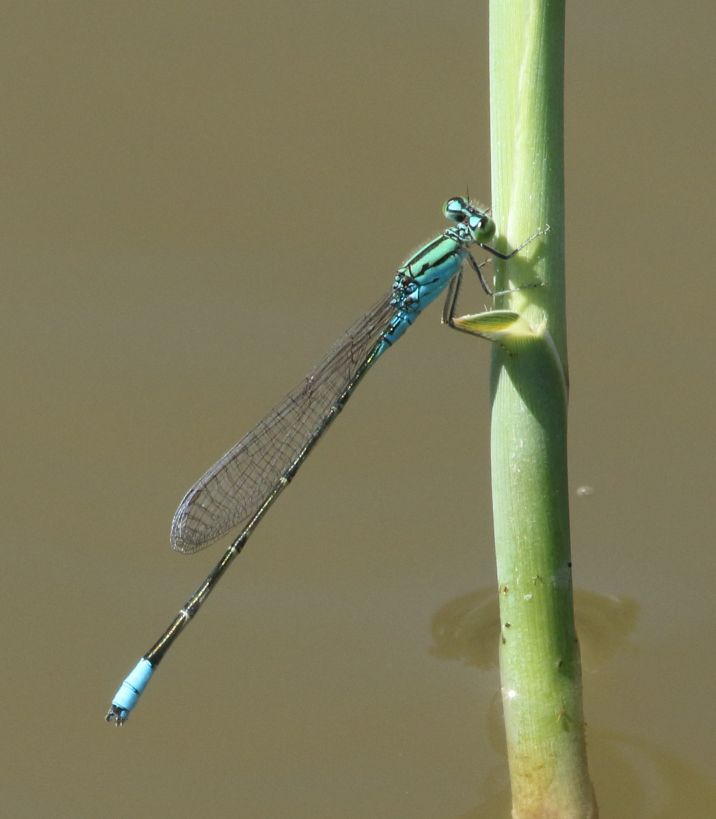
Male

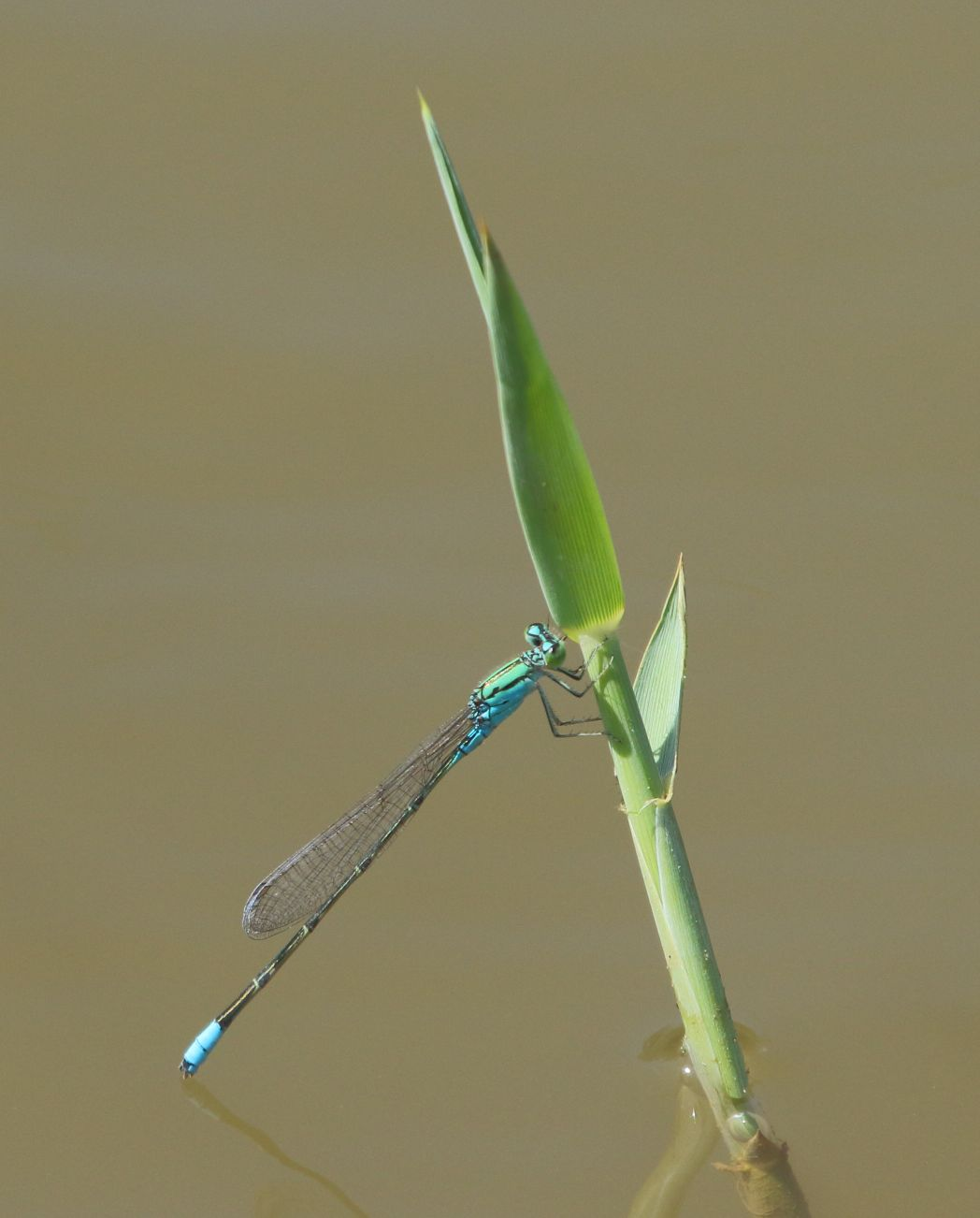
Male

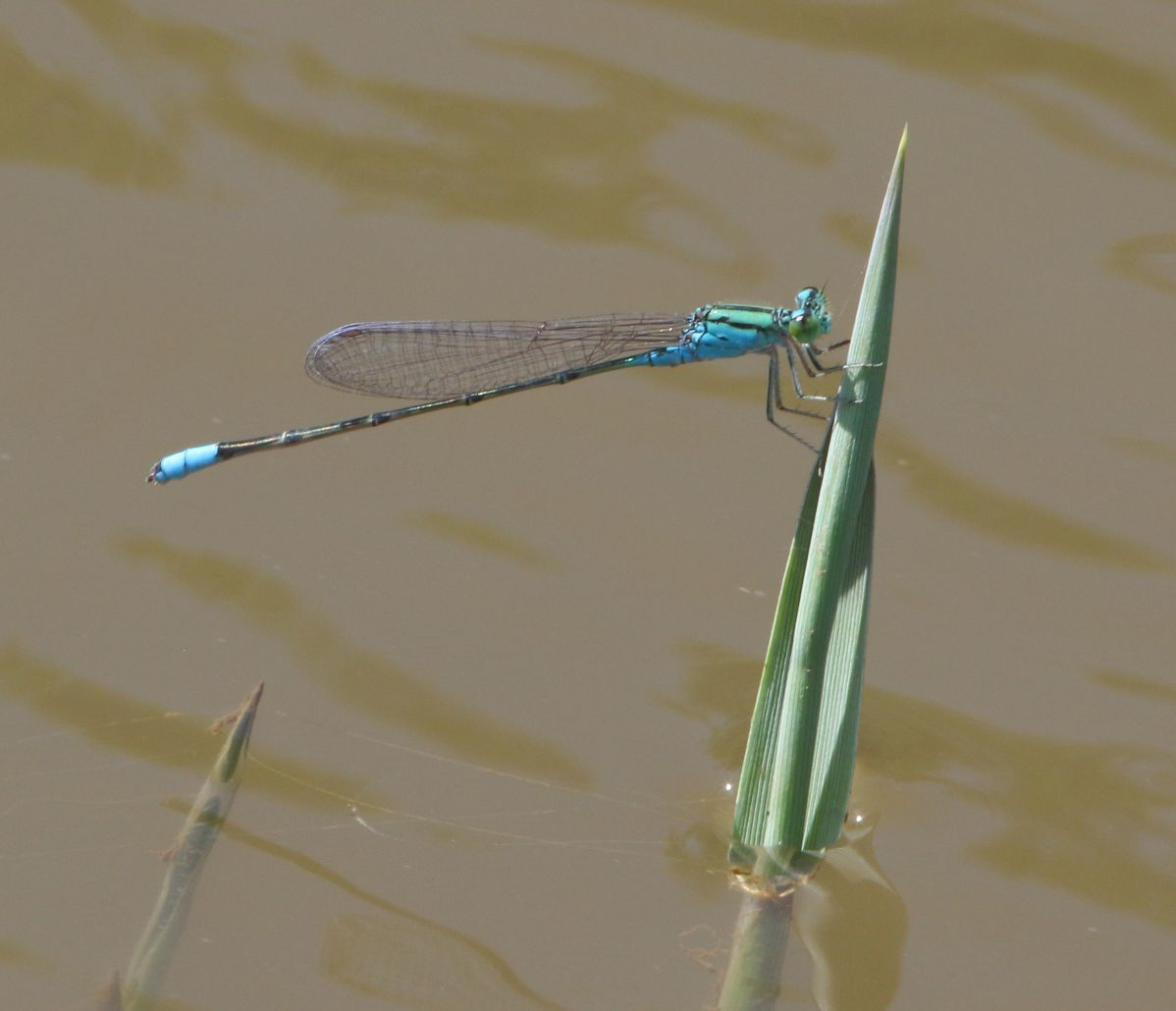
Male
