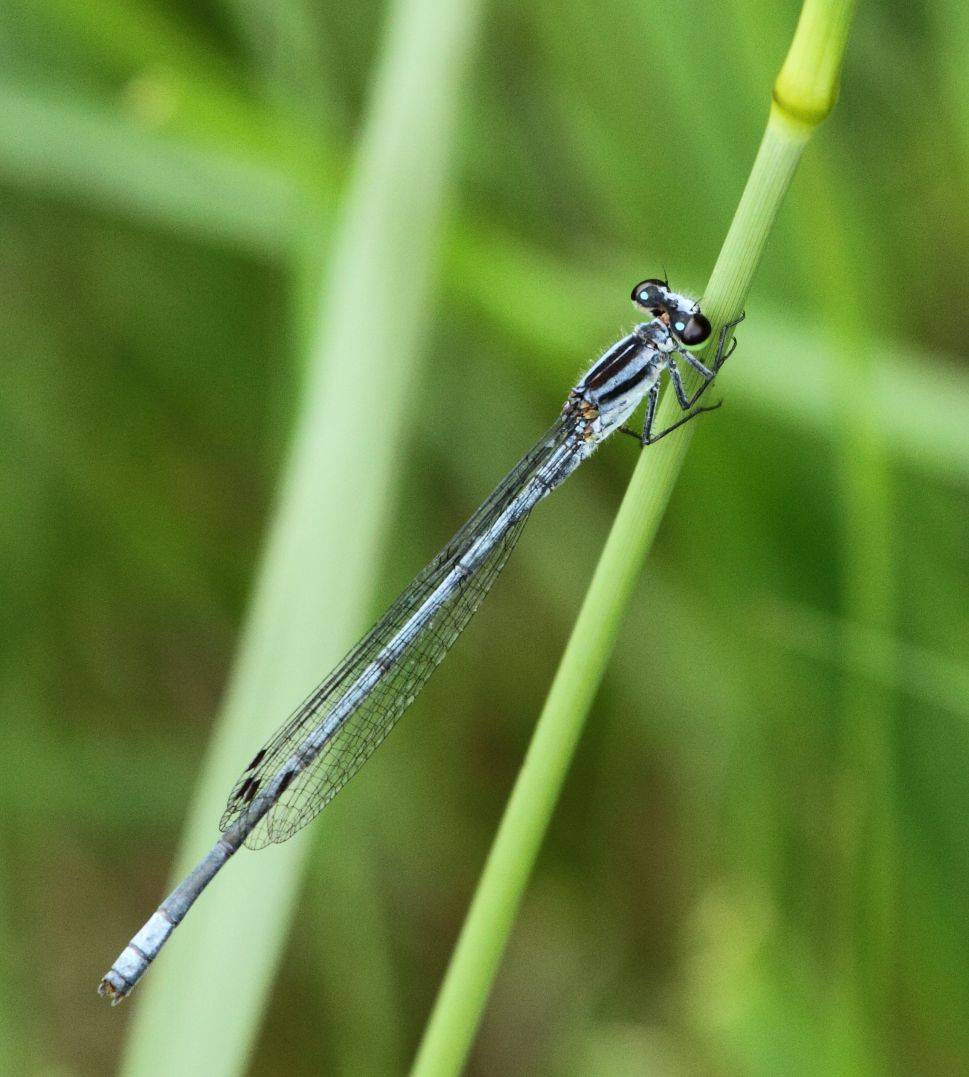
- Male

Conservation status
- Least Concern (IUCN 3.1)

Scientific classification
- Kingdom: Animalia
- Phylum: Arthropoda
- Clade: Pancrustacea
- Class: Insecta
- Order: Odonata
- Suborder: Zygoptera
- Family: Coenagrionidae
- Genus: Pseudagrion
- Species: P. kersteni

Binomial name
- Pseudagrion kersteni (Gerstäcker, 1869)

= Pseudagrion kersteni =

Species of damselfly

Pseudagrion kersteni, powder-striped sprite, Kersten's sprite or the powder-striped sprite, is a species of damselfly in the family Coenagrionidae. It is found in Angola, Benin, Burkina Faso, Cameroon, Central African Republic, Chad, the Republic of the Congo, Ivory Coast, Equatorial Guinea, Ethiopia, Ghana, Guinea, Kenya, Malawi, Mali, Mozambique, Namibia, Nigeria, Somalia, South Africa, Sudan, Tanzania, Togo, Uganda, Zambia, Zimbabwe, and possibly Burundi. Its natural habitat is rivers.

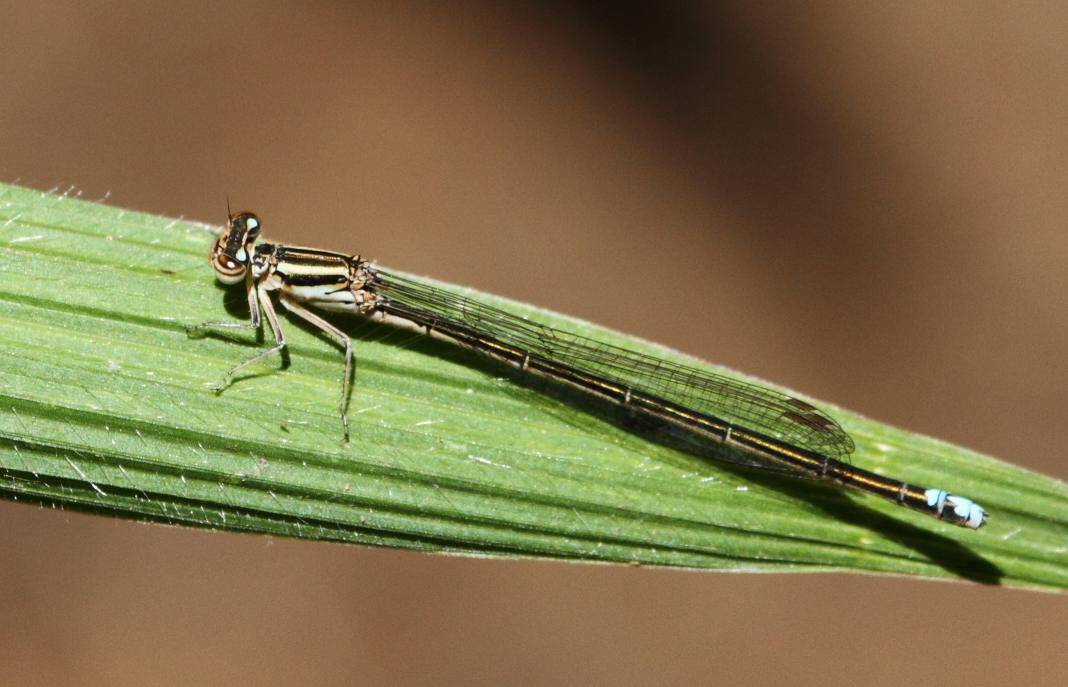
Female Kersten's sprite
