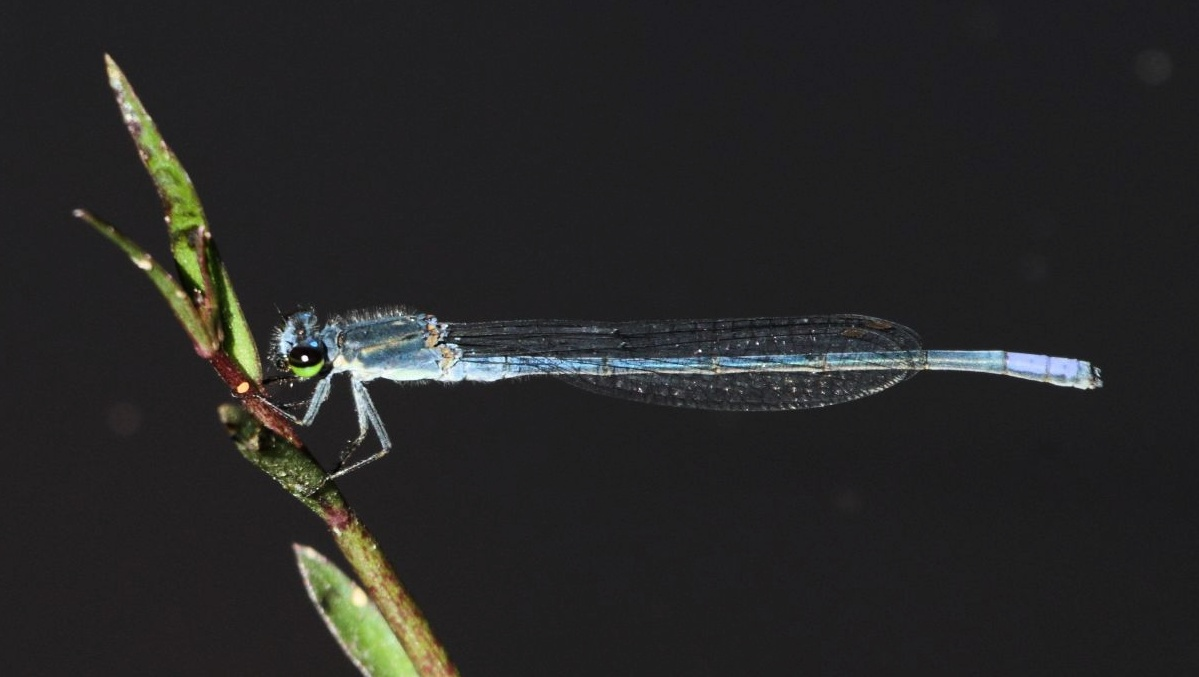
- Male

Conservation status
- Least Concern (IUCN 3.1)

Scientific classification
- Kingdom: Animalia
- Phylum: Arthropoda
- Clade: Pancrustacea
- Class: Insecta
- Order: Odonata
- Suborder: Zygoptera
- Family: Coenagrionidae
- Genus: Pseudagrion
- Species: P. draconis

Binomial name
- Pseudagrion draconis Barnard, 1937

= Pseudagrion draconis =

Species of damselfly

Pseudagrion draconis is a species of damselfly in the family Coenagrionidae. It is commonly known as the mountain sprite.

== Distribution and status ==
This sprite is endemic to South Africa and Lesotho; It is found from the south-western and southern Cape through the montane parts of the Eastern Cape, eastern Free State, Lesotho and KwaZulu-Natal to southern Gauteng. The species currently has no known threats. Its population is locally abundant and apparently stable.

== Habitat ==
Pseudagrion draconis is found at the vegetated edges of streams and rivers from October to March.

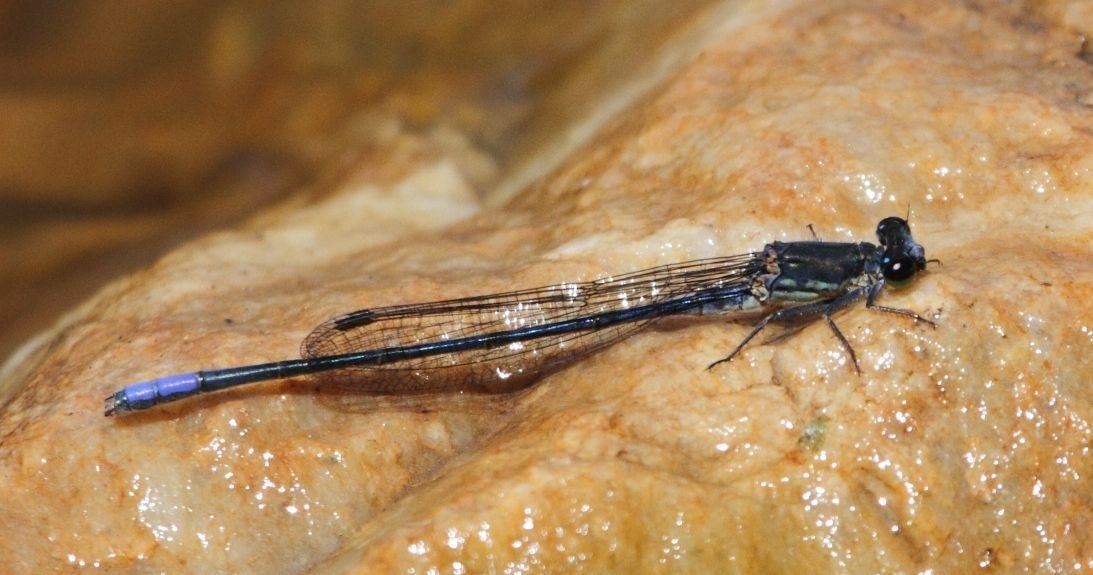
Male

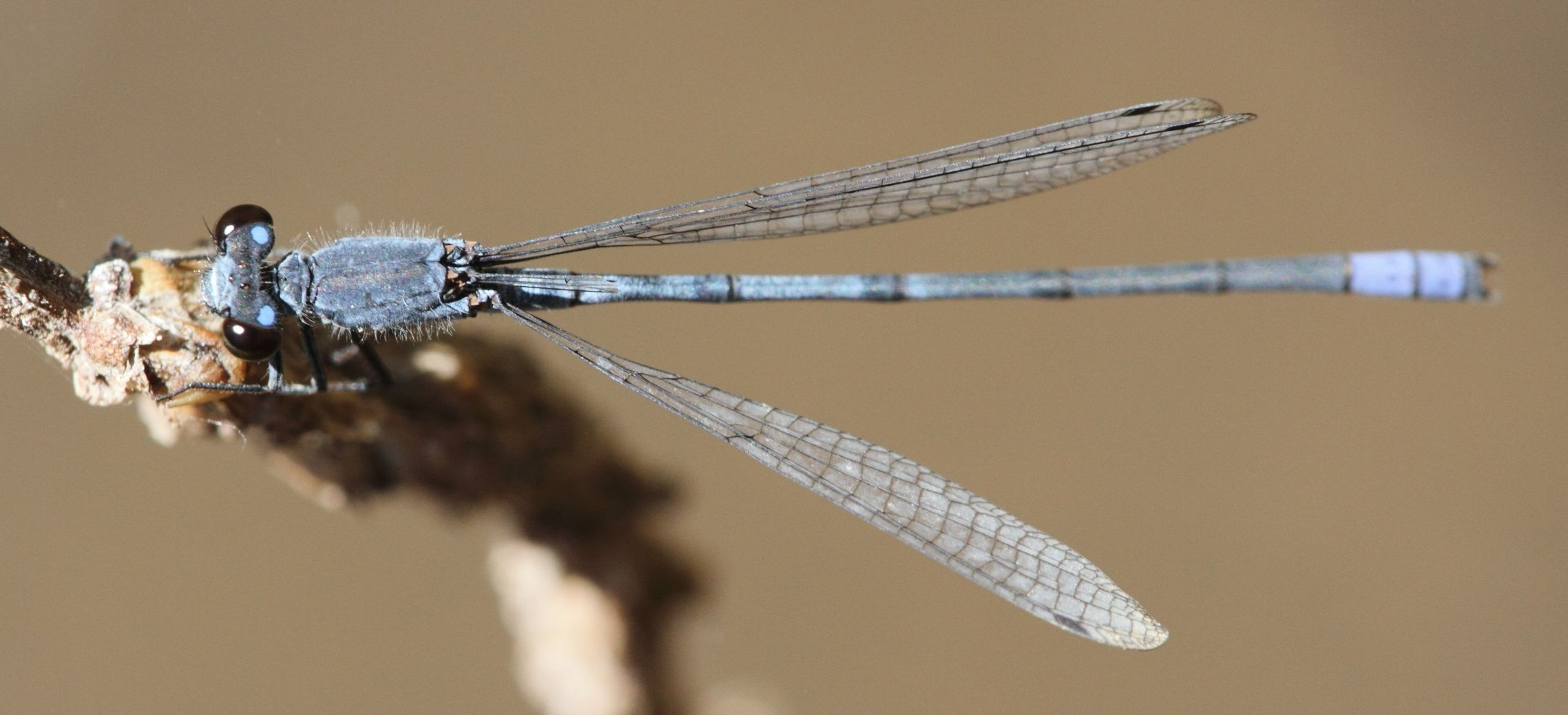
Male

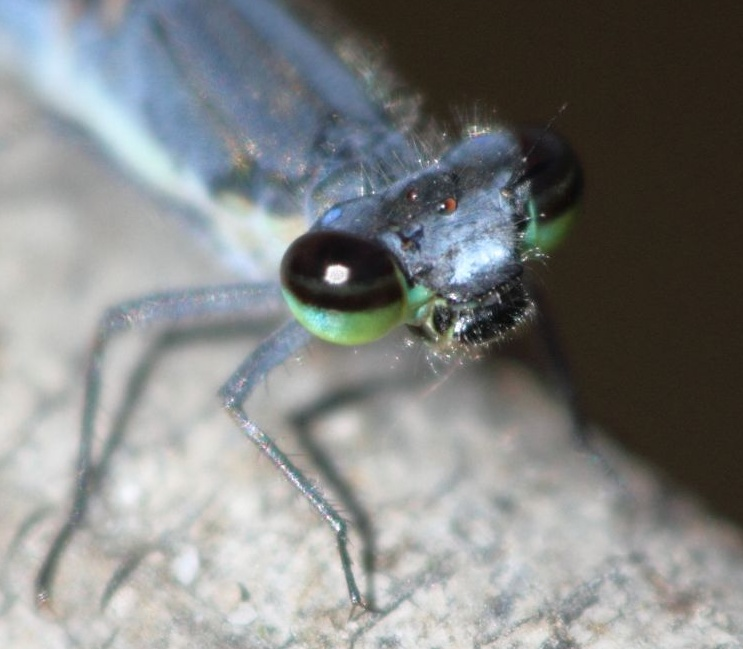
Male face

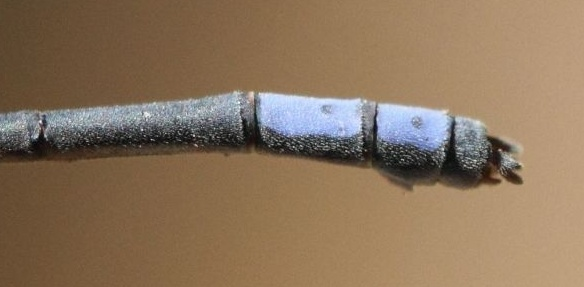
Tail (abdomen) of male

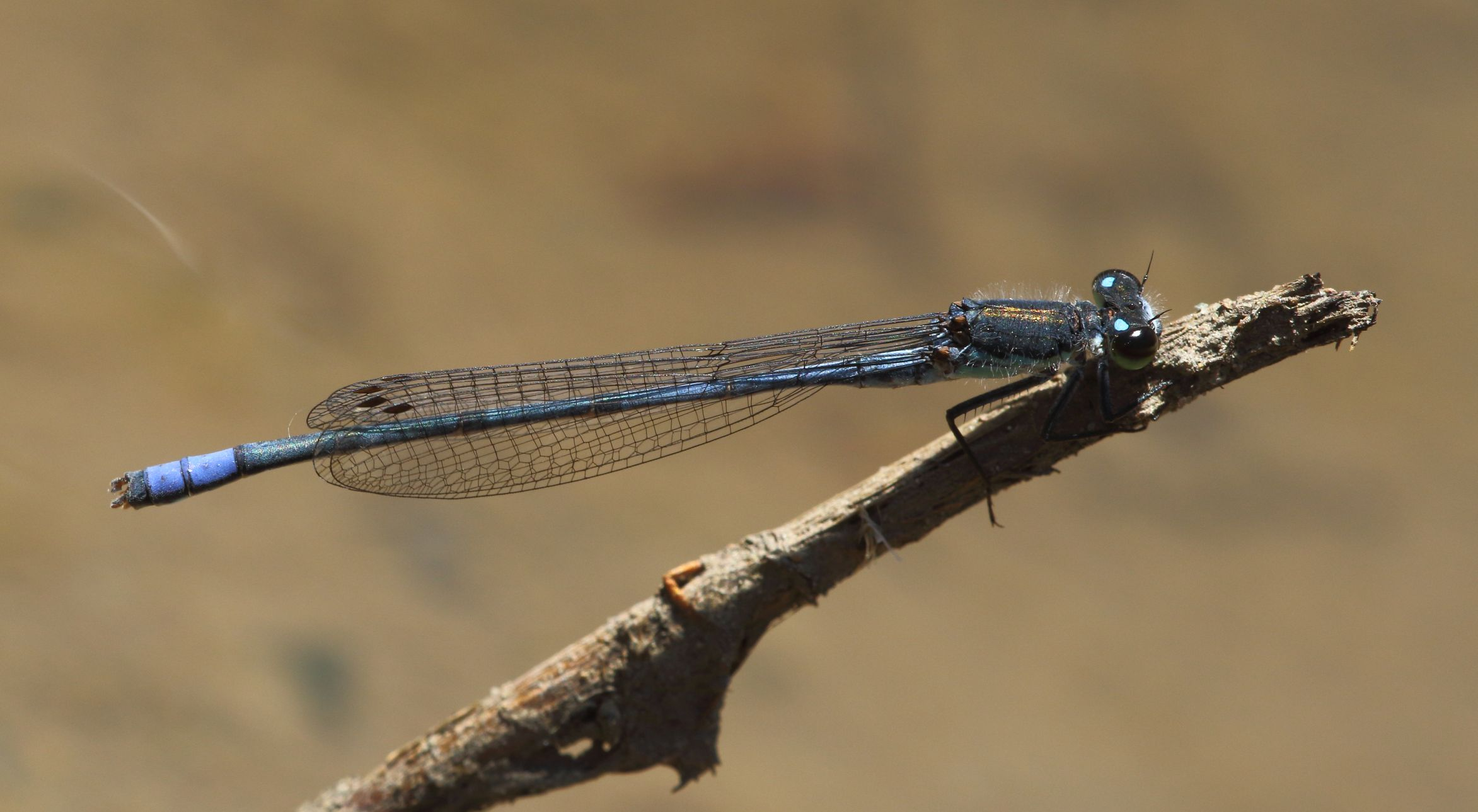
Male; Cedarville

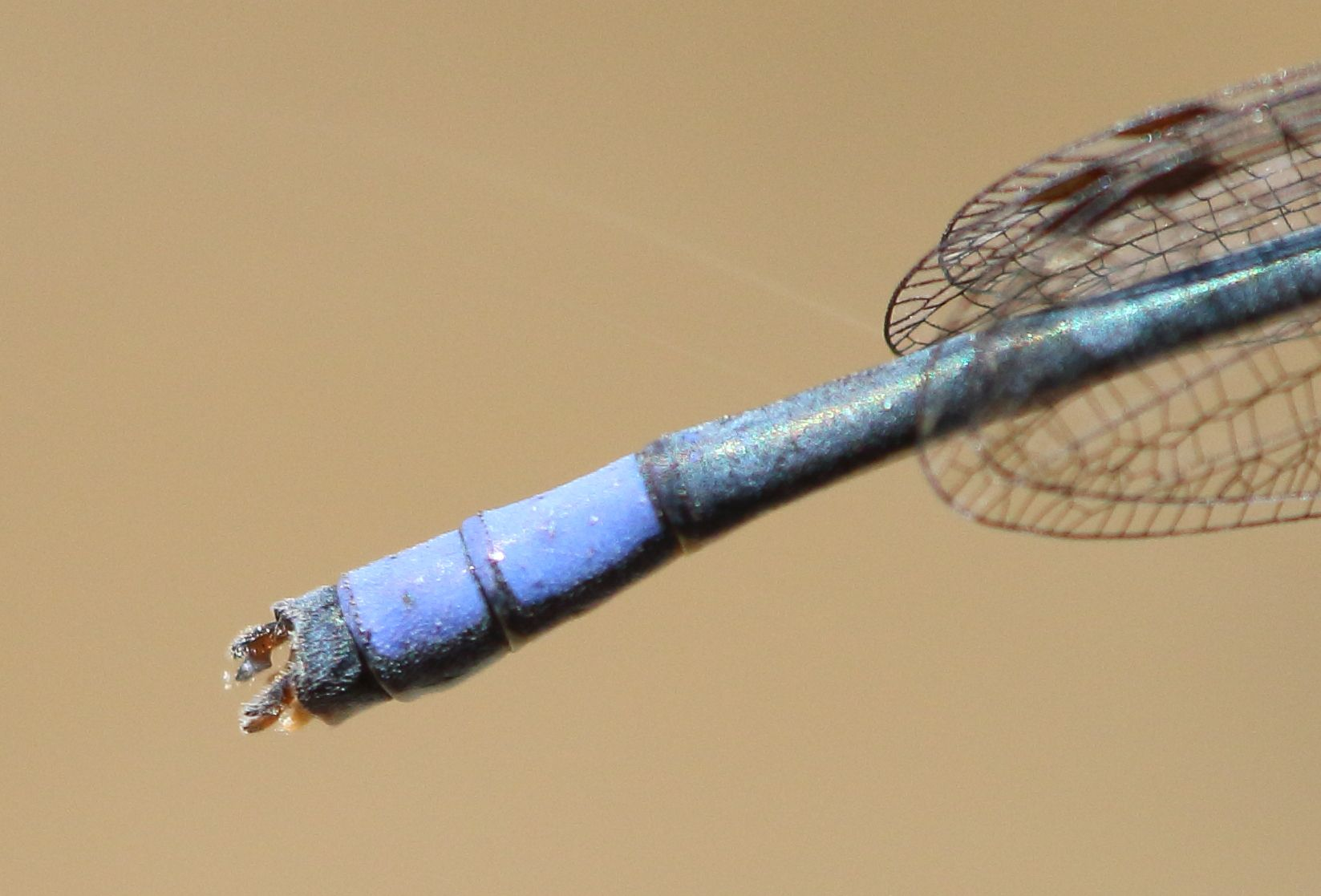
Male abdomen; Cedarville

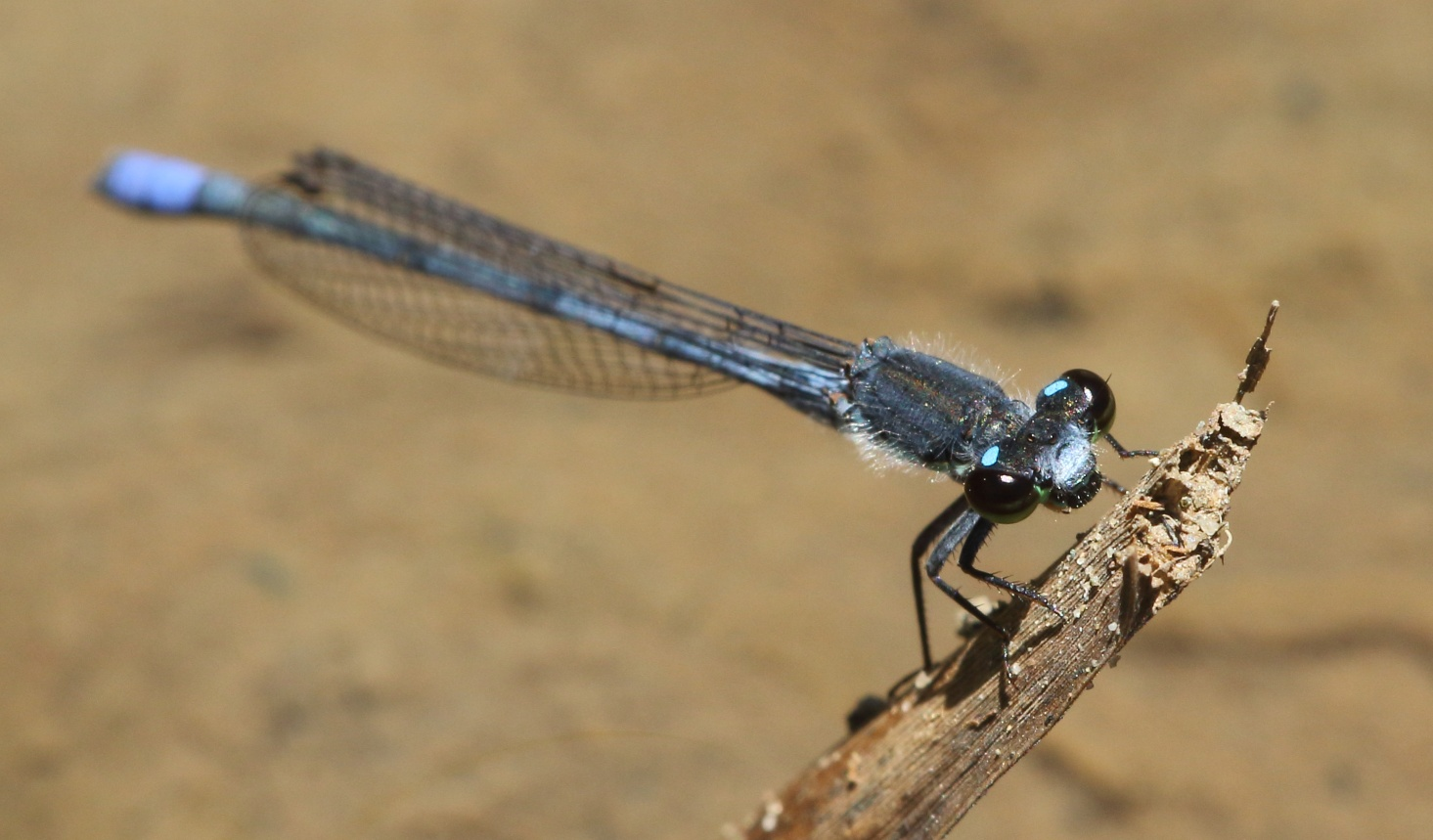
Male face; Cedarville

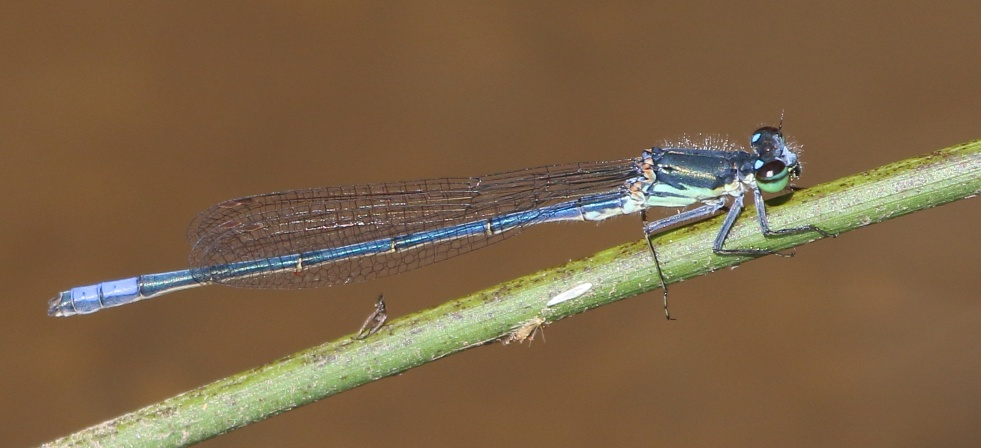
Male; Kamberg Nature Reserve

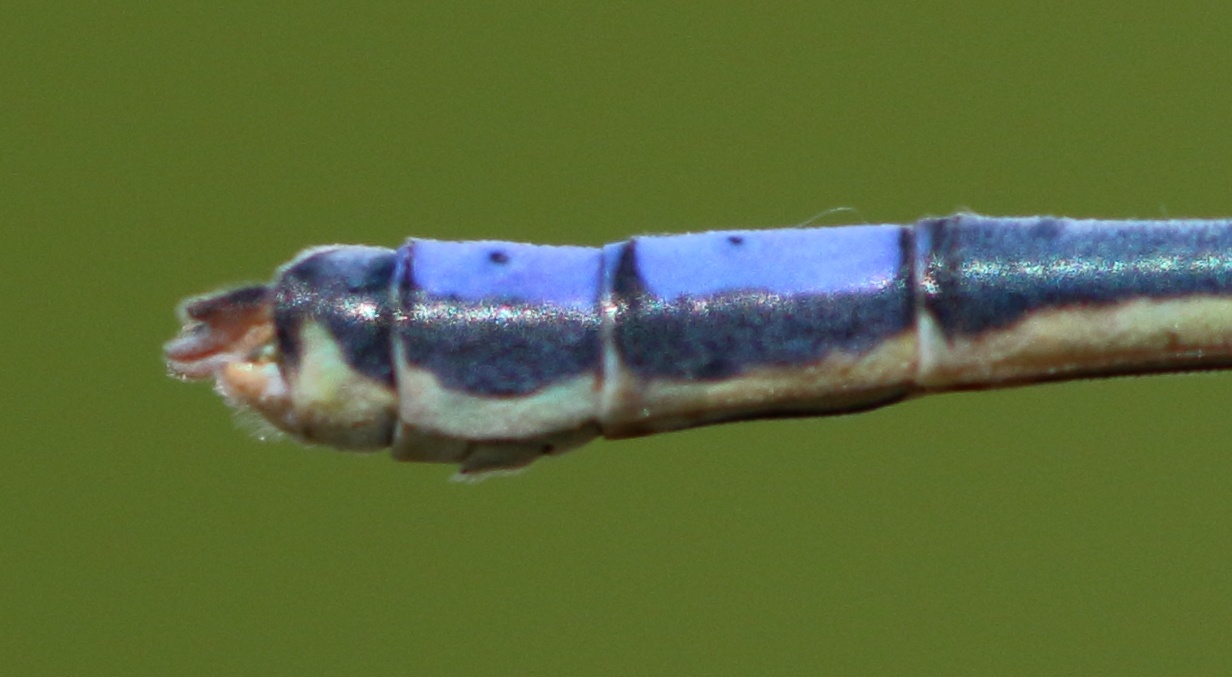
Male abdomen; Kamberg

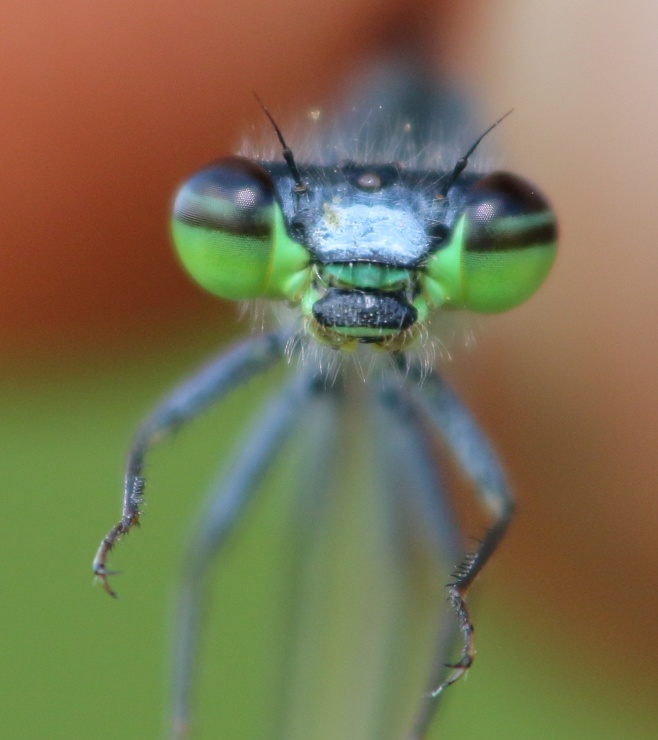
Male face; Kamberg
