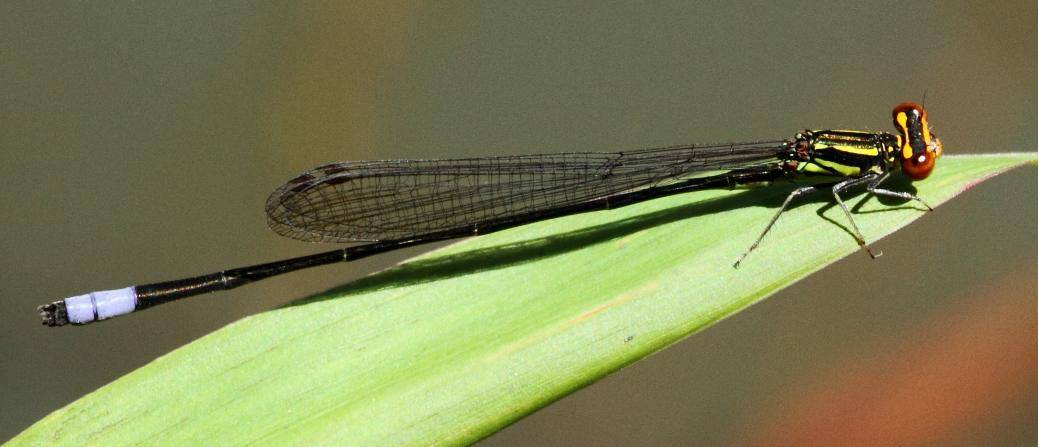
- Male

Conservation status
- Least Concern (IUCN 3.1)

Scientific classification
- Kingdom: Animalia
- Phylum: Arthropoda
- Clade: Pancrustacea
- Class: Insecta
- Order: Odonata
- Suborder: Zygoptera
- Family: Coenagrionidae
- Genus: Pseudagrion
- Species: P. hageni

Binomial name
- Pseudagrion hageni Karsch, 1893

= Pseudagrion hageni =

Species of damselfly

Pseudagrion hageni is a species of damselfly in the family Coenagrionidae. Common names include painted sprite and Hagen's sprite. It is found from South Africa to Kenya, Uganda, the Democratic Republic of the Congo and Angola (including Mozambique, Zimbabwe, Zambia, Malawi, and Tanzania). Its natural habitats are shaded streams in subtropical or tropical forest, thicket and bush.
