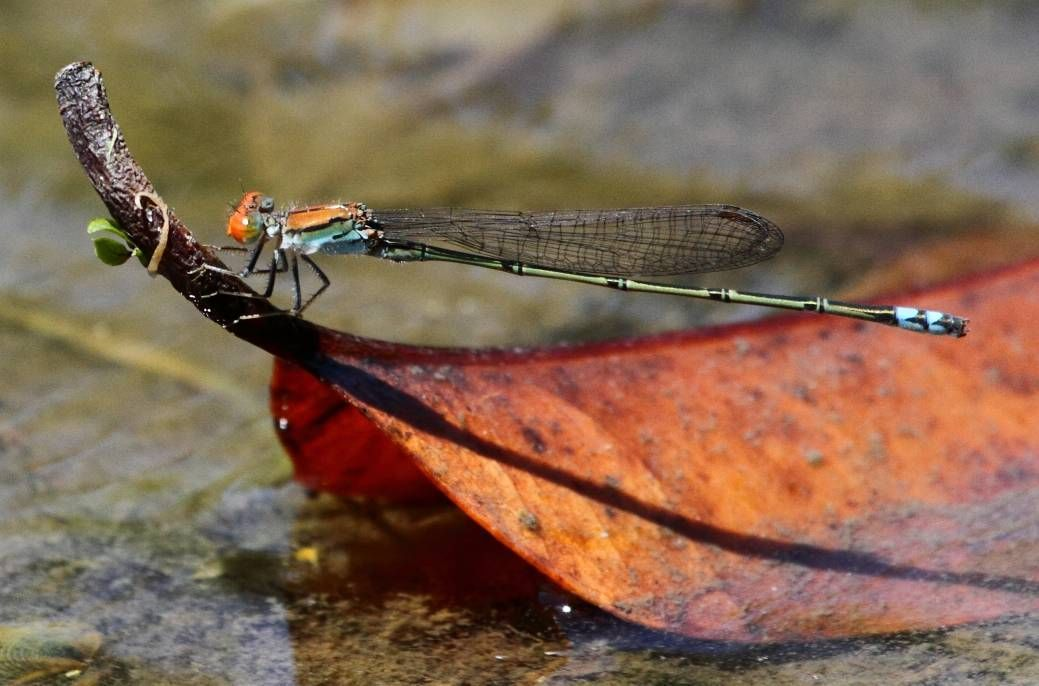

Conservation status
- Least Concern (IUCN 3.1)

Scientific classification
- Kingdom: Animalia
- Phylum: Arthropoda
- Clade: Pancrustacea
- Class: Insecta
- Order: Odonata
- Suborder: Zygoptera
- Family: Coenagrionidae
- Genus: Pseudagrion
- Species: P. acaciae

Binomial name
- Pseudagrion acaciae Förster, 1906

= Pseudagrion acaciae =

Species of damselfly

Pseudagrion acaciae, the acacia sprite is a species of damselfly in the family Coenagrionidae. It is found in Angola, Botswana, the Democratic Republic of the Congo, Malawi, Mozambique, Namibia, South Africa, Tanzania, Zambia, and Zimbabwe. Its natural habitats are subtropical or tropical rivers and floodplains.

A medium-sized damselfly (length 32–38 mm; wingspan 37–48 mm). The face is orange-red and it has greenish post-ocular spots. The front of the eyes are red-orange and the back of the eyes are green-blue. The synthorax is rusty red with black stripes above; the sides are light blue. The abdomen is lime green with black dorsal lines and black rings; segments eight and nine are bright pale blue with black markings at their ends.
