= Pseudagrion guichardi =

Conservation status
- Vulnerable (IUCN 3.1)

Scientific classification
- Kingdom: Animalia
- Phylum: Arthropoda
- Clade: Pancrustacea
- Class: Insecta
- Order: Odonata
- Suborder: Zygoptera
- Family: Coenagrionidae
- Genus: Pseudagrion
- Species: P. guichardi

Binomial name
- Pseudagrion guichardi Kimmins, 1958

Species of damselfly

Pseudagrion guichardi is a species of damselfly in the family Coenagrionidae. It is endemic to Ethiopia. Its natural habitats are subtropical or tropical moist montane forests and rivers. It is threatened by habitat loss.
