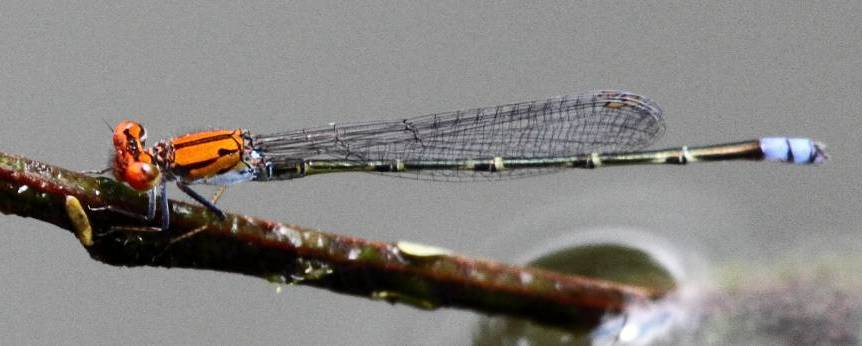
- Male

Conservation status
- Least Concern (IUCN 3.1)

Scientific classification
- Kingdom: Animalia
- Phylum: Arthropoda
- Clade: Pancrustacea
- Class: Insecta
- Order: Odonata
- Suborder: Zygoptera
- Family: Coenagrionidae
- Genus: Pseudagrion
- Species: P. massaicum

Binomial name
- Pseudagrion massaicum Sjöstedt, 1909

= Pseudagrion massaicum =

Species of damselfly

Pseudagrion massaicum is a species of damselfly in the family Coenagrionidae. It is found in Angola, Botswana, Comoros, the Democratic Republic of the Congo, Ethiopia, Ghana, Kenya, Malawi, Namibia, Somalia, South Africa, Sudan, Tanzania, Uganda, Zambia, Zimbabwe, possibly Burundi, and possibly Guinea. Its natural habitats are subtropical or tropical moist lowland forests, dry savanna, moist savanna, subtropical or tropical dry shrubland, subtropical or tropical moist shrubland, rivers, intermittent freshwater lakes, and freshwater marshes.
