= Pseudagrion superbum =

Conservation status
- Least Concern (IUCN 3.1)

Scientific classification
- Kingdom: Animalia
- Phylum: Arthropoda
- Clade: Pancrustacea
- Class: Insecta
- Order: Odonata
- Suborder: Zygoptera
- Family: Coenagrionidae
- Genus: Pseudagrion
- Species: P. superbum

Binomial name
- Pseudagrion superbum Fraser, 1956

Synonyms
- Pseudagrion quadrioculatum Pinhey, 1964

Species of damselfly

Pseudagrion superbum is a species of damselfly in the family Coenagrionidae. It is endemic to the Democratic Republic of the Congo. Its natural habitat is rivers.
