= Pseudagrion kibalense =

Conservation status
- Least Concern (IUCN 3.1)

Scientific classification
- Kingdom: Animalia
- Phylum: Arthropoda
- Clade: Pancrustacea
- Class: Insecta
- Order: Odonata
- Suborder: Zygoptera
- Family: Coenagrionidae
- Genus: Pseudagrion
- Species: P. kibalense

Binomial name
- Pseudagrion kibalense Longfield, 1959

Species of damselfly

Pseudagrion kibalense is a species of damselfly in the family Coenagrionidae. It is found in Angola, Central African Republic, the Republic of the Congo, the Democratic Republic of the Congo, Equatorial Guinea, Gabon, Kenya, Uganda, Zambia, and Zimbabwe. Its natural habitats are subtropical or tropical moist lowland forests and rivers.
