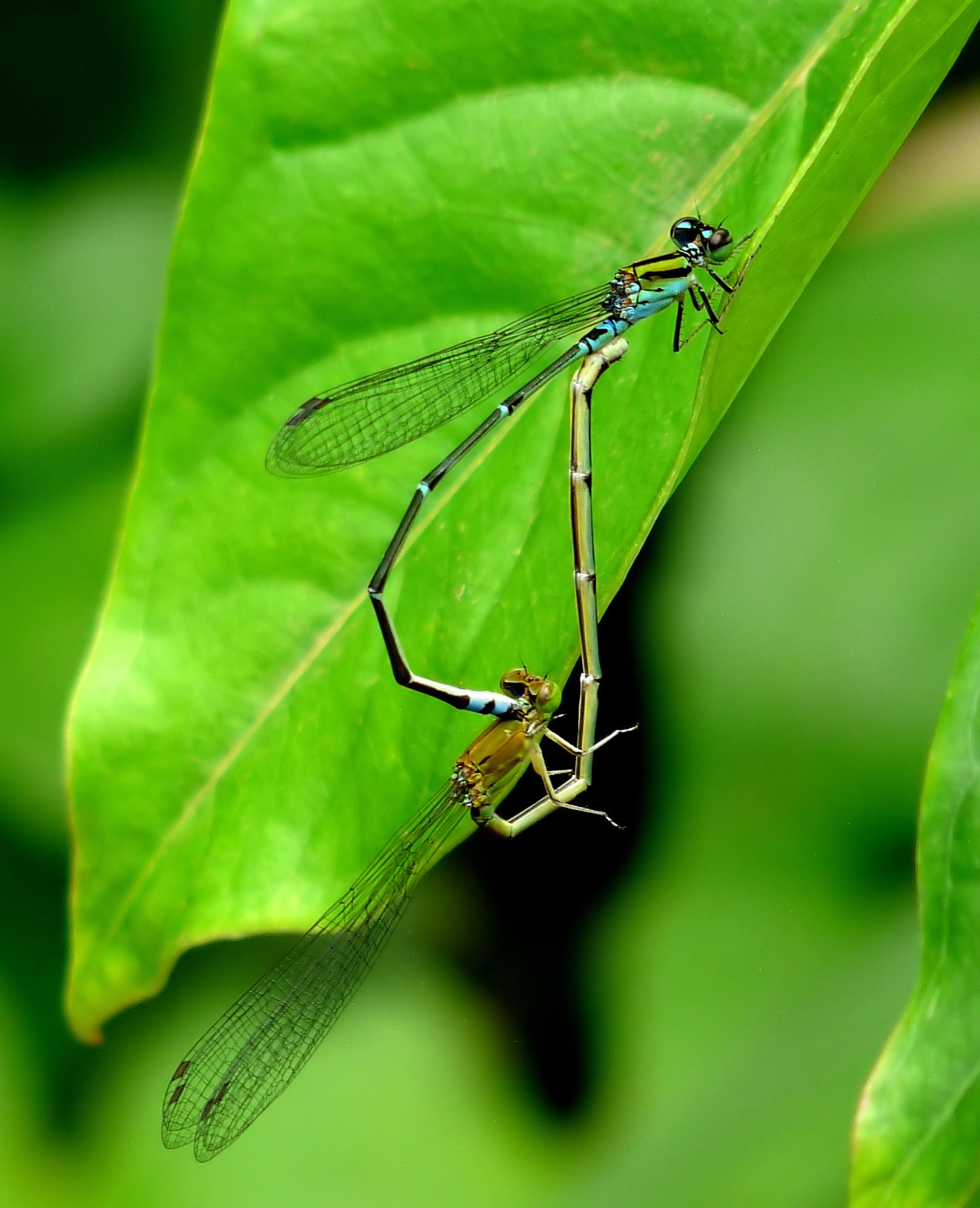
- Pseudagrion indicum

Scientific classification
- Kingdom: Animalia
- Phylum: Arthropoda
- Clade: Pancrustacea
- Class: Insecta
- Order: Odonata
- Suborder: Zygoptera
- Family: Coenagrionidae
- Genus: Pseudagrion; Selys, 1876

= Pseudagrion =

Genus of damselflies

Pseudagrion is the largest genus of damselfly in the family Coenagrionidae, with over 140 species. Its range includes most of Africa, much of Asia, and Australia. Africa holds most of the diversity with almost 100 species. It has occupied most of the freshwater habitats in its range, and dominates damselfly communities in habitats as different as desert pools, equatorial rainforests and montane streams.

On the African continent, the genus comprises two distinct groups: The "A-group" has about 45 species - they are predominantly highland species and males lack spines on S10; The "B-group" has about 25 species - mainly from lowlands and males have spines on S10. A third Afrotropical group comprises 31 species from the forest streams of Madagascar and the Comores.

== Etymology ==
The genus name Pseudagrion is derived from the Greek ψευδής (pseudēs, "false" or "not true"), combined with Agrion, a genus name derived from the Greek ἄγριος (agrios, "wild"). Agrion was the name given in 1775 by Johan Christian Fabricius for all damselflies.

== Species ==
The genus Pseudagrion includes the following species:

- Pseudagrion acaciae Förster, 1906 - Green-naped Sprite
- Pseudagrion aguessei Pinhey, 1964
- Pseudagrion alcicorne Förster, 1906
- Pseudagrion ambatoroae Aguesse, 1968
- Pseudagrion ampolomitae Aguesse, 1968
- Pseudagrion andamanicum Fraser, 1924
- Pseudagrion angolense Selys, 1876
- Pseudagrion apicale Schmidt, 1951
- Pseudagrion approximatum Schmidt, 1951
- Pseudagrion arabicum Waterston, 1980
- Pseudagrion assegaii Pinhey, 1950 - Spearhead Sprite
- Pseudagrion aureofrons Tillyard, 1906 - Gold-fronted Riverdamsel
- Pseudagrion australasiae Selys, 1876
- Pseudagrion azureum Needham & Gyger, 1939
- Pseudagrion basicornu Schmidt, 1936
- Pseudagrion bernardi Terzani & Carletti, 2001
- Pseudagrion bicoerulans Martin, 1906
- Pseudagrion bidentatum Morton, 1907
- Pseudagrion buenafei Müller, 1996
- Pseudagrion caffrum (Burmeister, 1839) - Springhead Sprite
- Pseudagrion calosomum Lieftinck, 1936
- Pseudagrion camerunense (Karsch, 1899)
- Pseudagrion celebense Lieftinck, 1937
- Pseudagrion cheliferum Fraser, 1949
- Pseudagrion chloroceps Fraser, 1953
- Pseudagrion cingillum (Brauer, 1869) - Northern Riverdamsel
- Pseudagrion citricola Barnard, 1937 - Yellow-faced Sprite
- Pseudagrion civicum Lieftinck, 1932
- Pseudagrion coarctatum Lieftinck, 1932
- Pseudagrion coeleste Longfield, 1947 - Catshead Sprite
- Pseudagrion coeruleipunctum Pinhey, 1964
- Pseudagrion commoniae Förster, 1902 - Black Sprite, Mourning Spite
- Pseudagrion coomansi Lieftinck, 1937
- Pseudagrion coriaceum Selys, 1876
- Pseudagrion crenatum Seehausen & Marinov, 2026
- Pseudagrion crocops Selys, 1876
- Pseudagrion cyathiforme Pinhey, 1973
- Pseudagrion daponshanensis Zhou & Zhou, 2007
- Pseudagrion deconcertans Aguess, 1968
- Pseudagrion decorum (Rambur, 1842)
- Pseudagrion deningi Pinhey, 1961
- Pseudagrion dispar Schmidt, 1951
- Pseudagrion divaricatum Schmidt, 1951
- Pseudagrion draconis Barnard, 1937 - Mountain Sprite
- Pseudagrion dundoense Longfield, 1959
- Pseudagrion emarginatum Karsch, 1893
- Pseudagrion epiphonematicum Karsch, 1891
- Pseudagrion estesi Pinhey, 1971
- Pseudagrion evanidum Needham & Gyger, 1939
- Pseudagrion farinicolle Lieftinck, 1932
- Pseudagrion fisheri Pinhey, 1961
- Pseudagrion flavipes Sjöstedt, 1900
- Pseudagrion fumipennis Polhemus, Michalski & Richards, 2008
- Pseudagrion furcigerum (Rambur, 1842) - Palmiet Sprite, Cape Sprite
- Pseudagrion gamblesi Pinhey, 1978 - Great Sprite
- Pseudagrion giganteum Schmidt, 1951
- Pseudagrion gigas Schmidt in Ris, 1936
- Pseudagrion glaucescens Selys, 1876
- Pseudagrion glaucoideum Schmidt, 1936
- Pseudagrion greeni Pinhey, 1961
- Pseudagrion grilloti Legrand, 1987
- Pseudagrion guichardi Kimmins, 1958
- Pseudagrion hageni Karsch, 1893 - Painted Sprite
- Pseudagrion hamoni Fraser, 1955 - Drab Sprite
- Pseudagrion hamulus Schmidt, 1951
- Pseudagrion helenae Balinsky, 1964
- Pseudagrion hypermelas Selys, 1876
- Pseudagrion igniceps Fraser, 1953
- Pseudagrion ignifer Tillyard, 1906 - Flame-headed Riverdamsel
- Pseudagrion incisurum Lieftinck, 1949
- Pseudagrion inconspicuum Ris, 1931
- Pseudagrion indicum Fraser, 1924
- Pseudagrion ingrid Theischinger, 2000
- Pseudagrion inopinatum Balinsky, 1971 - Badplaas Sprite
- Pseudagrion jedda Theischinger & Watson, 1991 - Dusky Riverdamsel
- Pseudagrion kaffinum Consiglio, 1978
- Pseudagrion kersteni (Gerstäcker, 1869) - Powder-striped Sprite
- Pseudagrion kibalense Longfield, 1959
- Pseudagrion laidlawi Fraser, 1922
- Pseudagrion lalakense Orr & van Tol, 2001
- Pseudagrion lindicum Grünberg, 1902
- Pseudagrion lorenzi Gassmann, 2011
- Pseudagrion lucidum Schmidt, 1951
- Pseudagrion lucifer Theischinger, 1997 - Citrine-headed Riverdamsel
- Pseudagrion macrolucidum Aguesse, 1968
- Pseudagrion makabusiense Pinhey, 1950 - Makabusi Sprite
- Pseudagrion malabaricum Fraser, 1924
- Pseudagrion malagasoides Pinhey, 1973
- Pseudagrion malgassicum Schmidt, 1951
- Pseudagrion mascagnii Terzani & Marconi, 2004
- Pseudagrion massaicum Sjöstedt, 1909
- Pseudagrion melanicterum Selys, 1876
- Pseudagrion mellisi Schmidt, 1951
- Pseudagrion merina Schmidt, 1951
- Pseudagrion microcephalum (Rambur, 1842) - Blue Riverdamsel
- Pseudagrion mohelii Aguesse, 1968
- Pseudagrion newtoni Pinhey, 1962 - Harlequin Sprite
- Pseudagrion nigripes Schmidt, 1951
- Pseudagrion nigrofasciatum Lieftinck, 1934
- Pseudagrion niloticum Dumont, 1978
- Pseudagrion nubicum Selys, 1876 - Bluetail Sprite
- Pseudagrion olsufieffi Schmidt, 1951
- Pseudagrion pacificum Tillyard, 1924
- Pseudagrion palauense Lieftinck, 1962
- Pseudagrion pelecotomum Lieftinck, 1932
- Pseudagrion perfuscatum Lieftinck, 1937
- Pseudagrion pilidorsum (Brauer, 1868)
- Pseudagrion pirata Seehausen & Marinov, 2026
- Pseudagrion pontogenes Ris, 1915
- Pseudagrion pruinosum (Burmeister, 1839)
- Pseudagrion pterauratum Aguesse, 1968
- Pseudagrion punctum (Rambur, 1842)
- Pseudagrion renaudi Fraser, 1953
- Pseudagrion risi Schmidt in Ris, 1936
- Pseudagrion rubriceps Selys, 1876
- Pseudagrion rufocinctum Pinhey, 1956
- Pseudagrion rufostigma Longfield, 1947
- Pseudagrion salisburyense Ris, 1921 - Slate Sprite
- Pseudagrion samoense Fraser, 1925
- Pseudagrion schmidtianum Lieftinck, 1936
- Pseudagrion serrulatum Karsch, 1894
- Pseudagrion seyrigi Schmidt, 1951
- Pseudagrion siamense Fraser, 1922
- Pseudagrion silaceum Lieftinck, 1932
- Pseudagrion simile Schmidt, 1951
- Pseudagrion simonae Legrand, 1987
- Pseudagrion simplicilaminatum Carletti & Terzani, 1997
- Pseudagrion sjoestedti Förster, 1906
- Pseudagrion spencei Fraser, 1922
- Pseudagrion spernatum Selys, 1881
- Pseudagrion spinithoracicum Legrand, 1981
- Pseudagrion starreanum Lieftinck, 1949
- Pseudagrion stuckenbergi Pinhey, 1964
- Pseudagrion sublacteum (Karsch, 1893) - Rifle Sprite
- Pseudagrion sudanicum Le Roi, 1915
- Pseudagrion superbum Fraser, 1956
- Pseudagrion symoensii Pinhey, 1967
- Pseudagrion syriacum Selys, 1887
- Pseudagrion thenartum Fraser, 1955
- Pseudagrion tinctipenne Fraser, 1951
- Pseudagrion torridum Selys, 1876
- Pseudagrion tricorne Pinhey, 1967
- Pseudagrion trigonale Schmidt, 1951
- Pseudagrion umsingaziense Balinsky, 1963
- Pseudagrion ungulatum Fraser, 1951
- Pseudagrion ustum Selys, 1876
- Pseudagrion vaalense Chutter, 1962
- Pseudagrion vakoanae Aguesse, 1968
- Pseudagrion vumbaense Balinsky, 1963
- Pseudagrion williamsoni Fraser, 1922
- Pseudagrion woodlarkensis Gassmann & Richards, 2016
- Pseudagrion yalomi Hunter, Sutherland, Bushnell, Scribner, Bybee & Kalkman, 2026

=== Gallery of species without an article ===
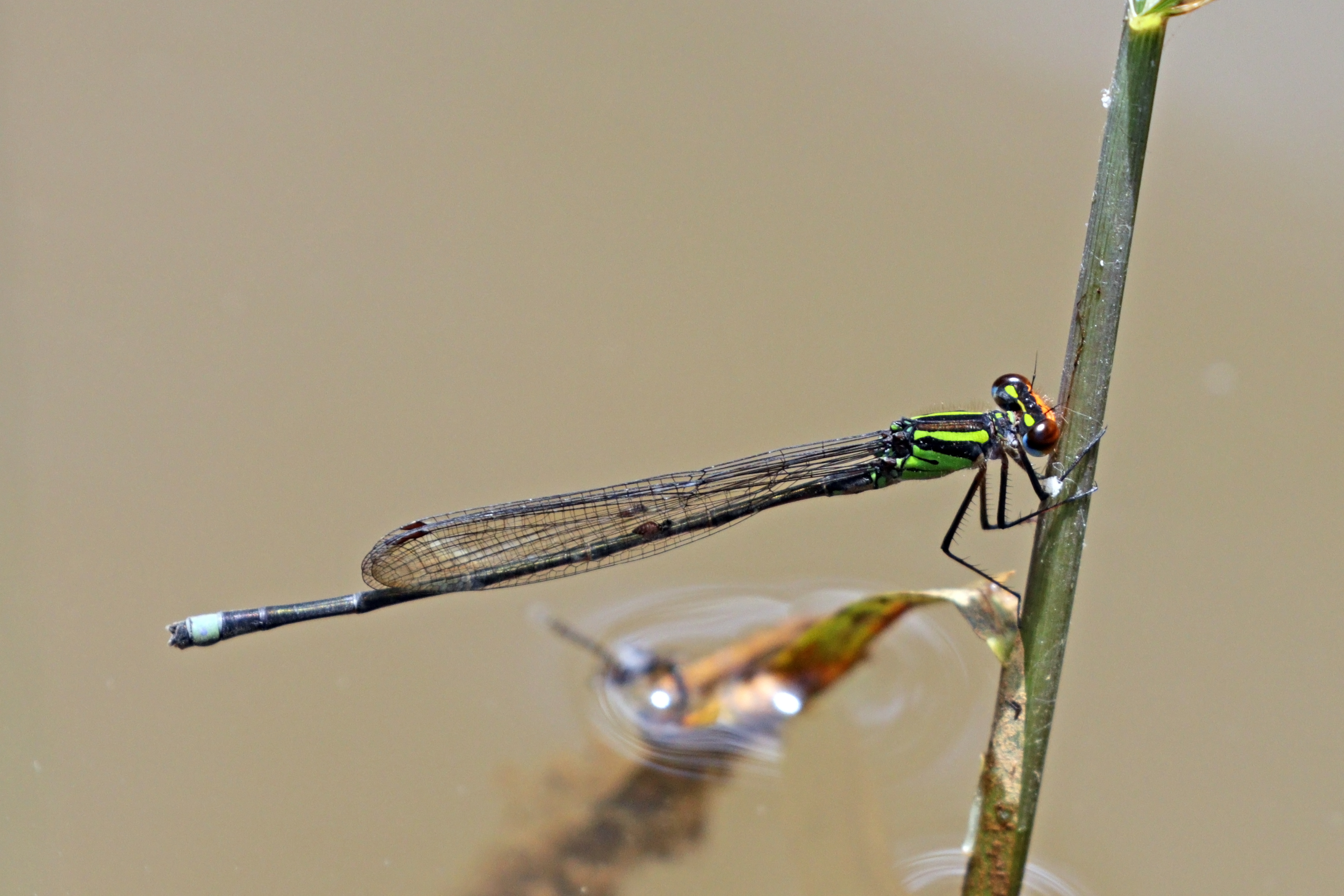
Pseudagrion dispar male

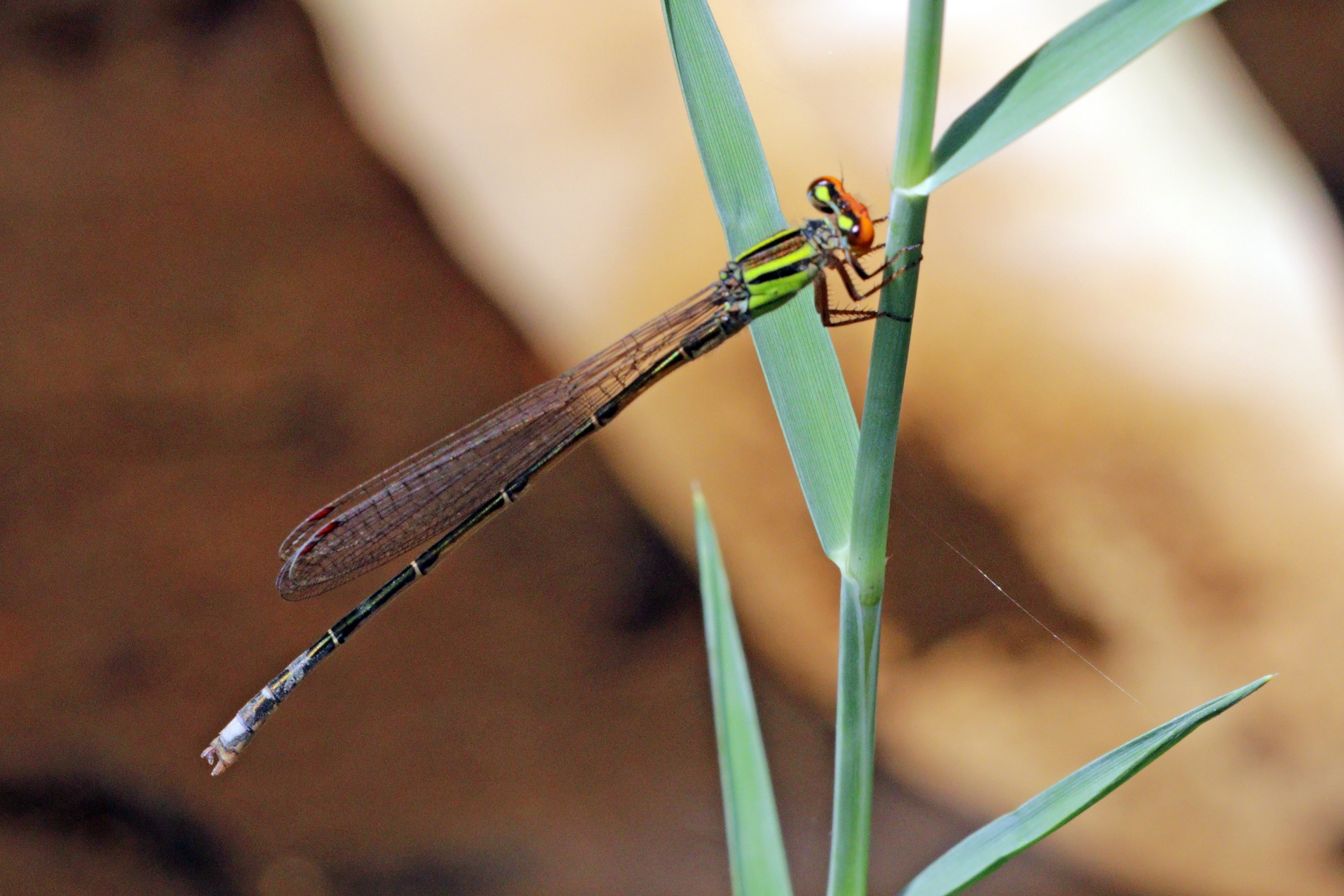
Pseudagrion malagassicum male

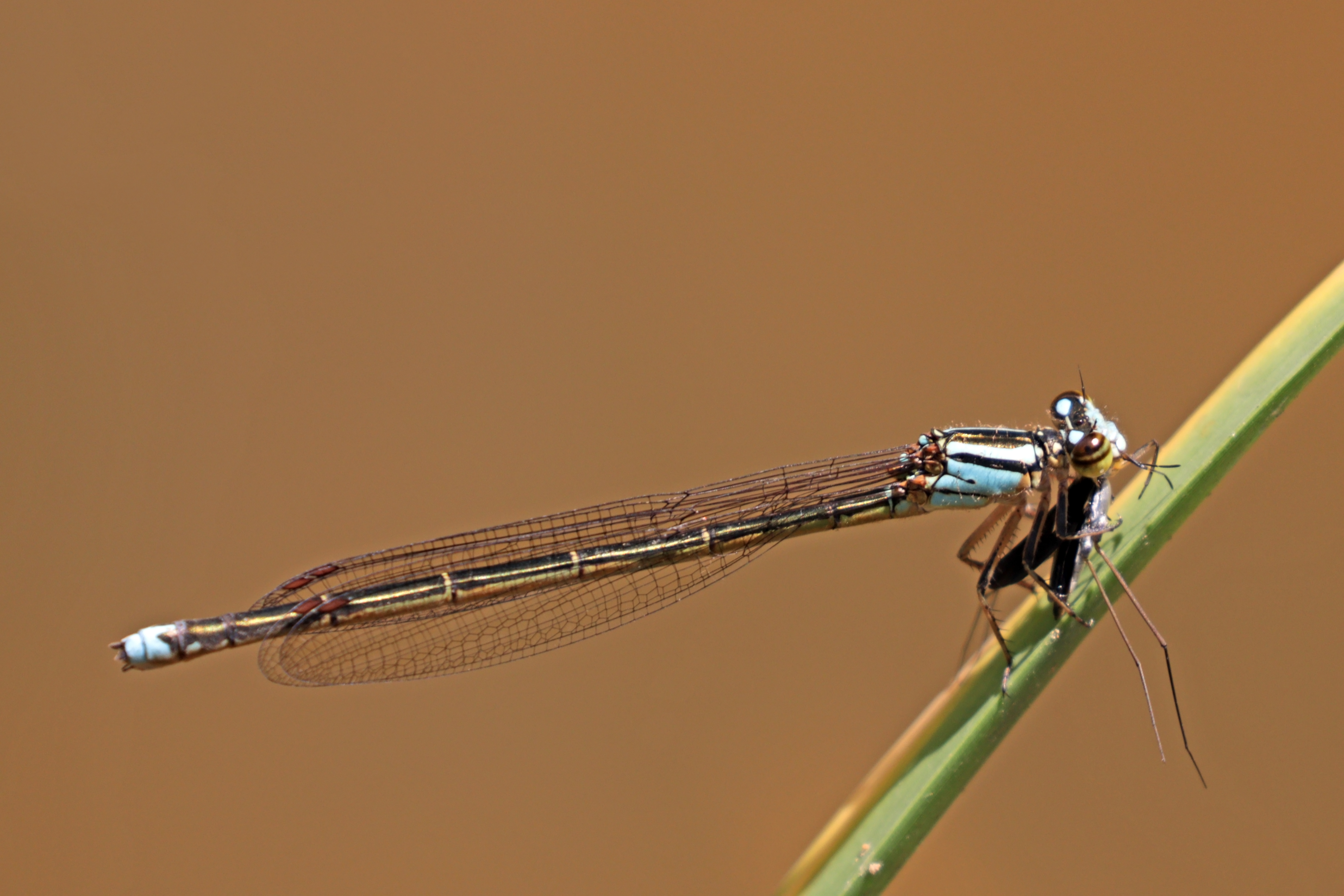
Pseudagrion malagassicum female
