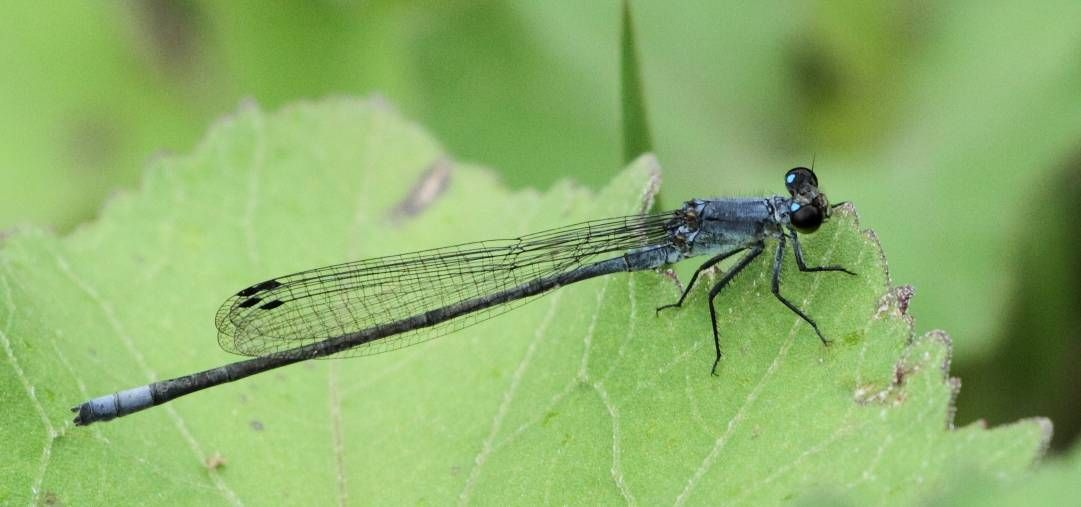

Conservation status
- Least Concern (IUCN 3.1)

Scientific classification
- Kingdom: Animalia
- Phylum: Arthropoda
- Clade: Pancrustacea
- Class: Insecta
- Order: Odonata
- Suborder: Zygoptera
- Family: Coenagrionidae
- Genus: Pseudagrion
- Species: P. salisburyense

Binomial name
- Pseudagrion salisburyense Ris, 1921

= Pseudagrion salisburyense =

Species of damselfly

Pseudagrion salisburyense is a species of damselfly in the family Coenagrionidae. It is found in Angola, Botswana, Ethiopia, Kenya, Malawi, Mozambique, Namibia, Somalia, South Africa, Tanzania, Uganda, Zambia, Zimbabwe, and possibly Burundi. Its natural habitats are subtropical or tropical moist lowland forests, dry savanna, moist savanna, subtropical or tropical dry shrubland, subtropical or tropical moist shrubland, and intermittent rivers.

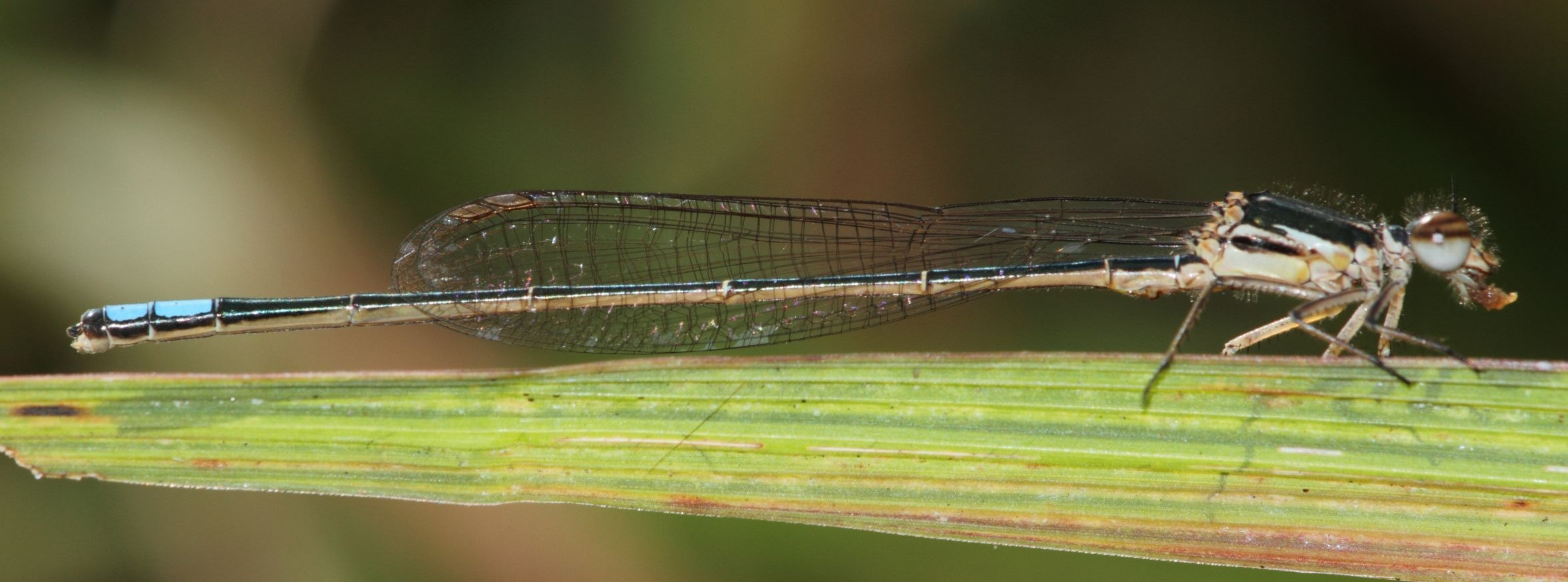
Teneral male

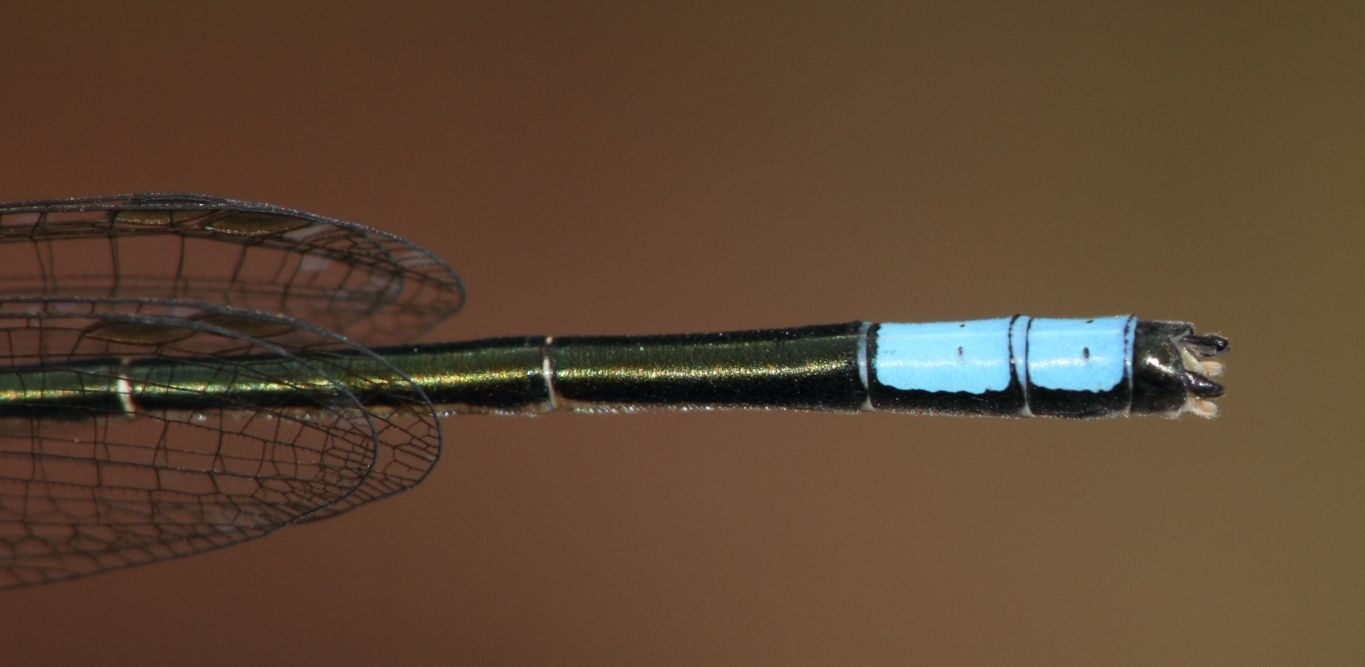
Tail (abdomen) of teneral male

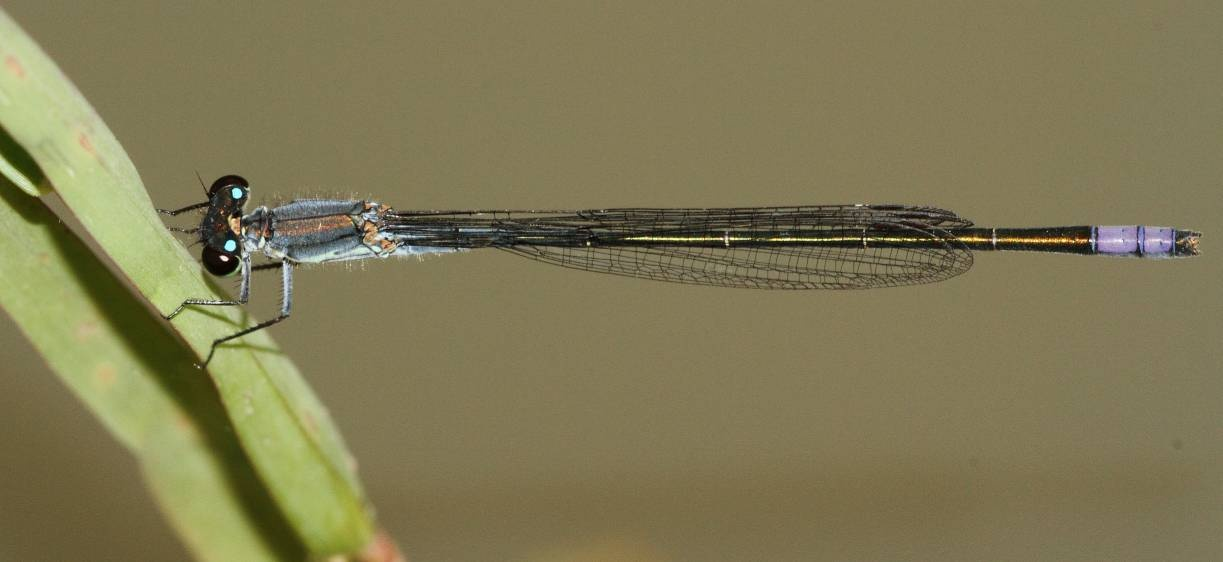
Immature male

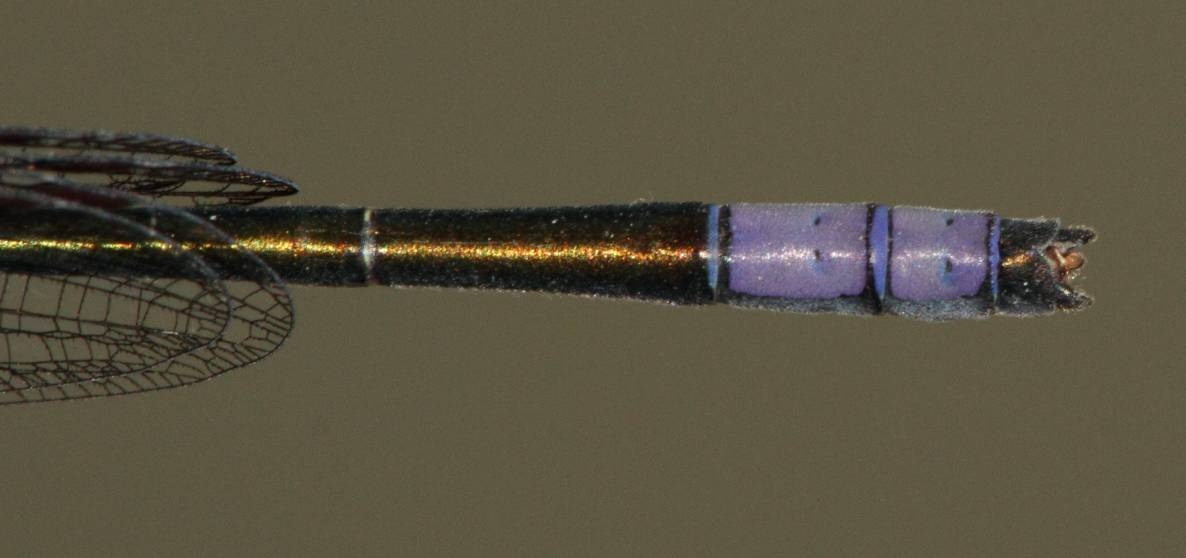
Tail (abdomen) of immature male

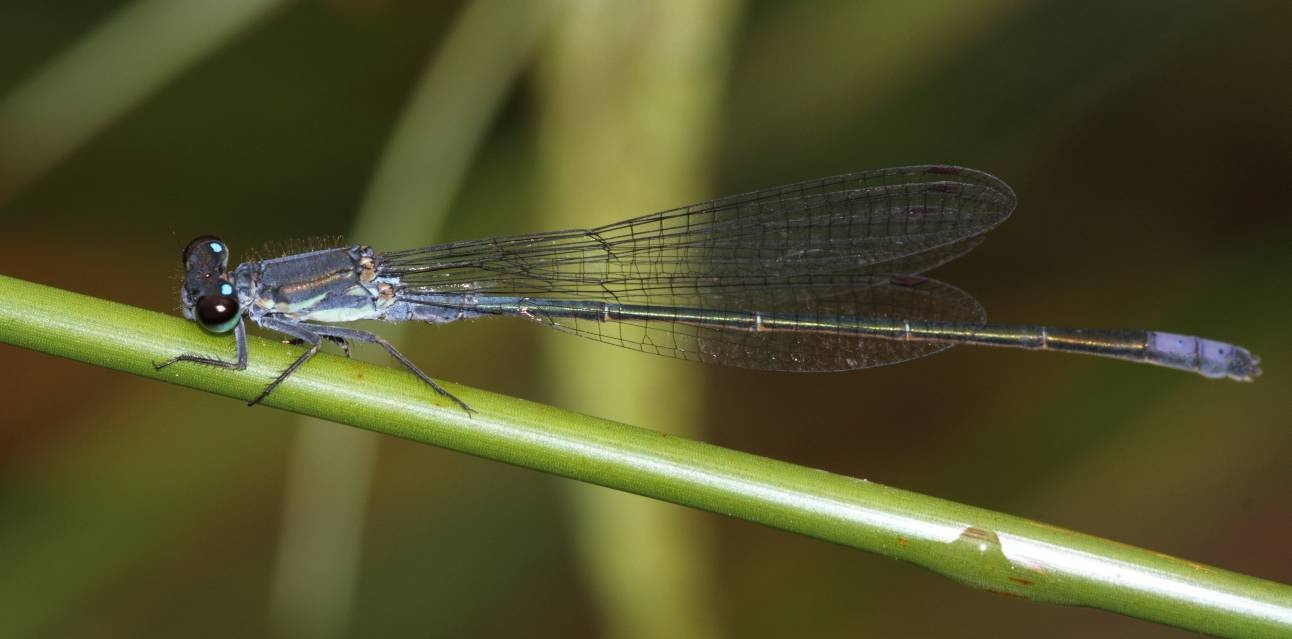
Mature male

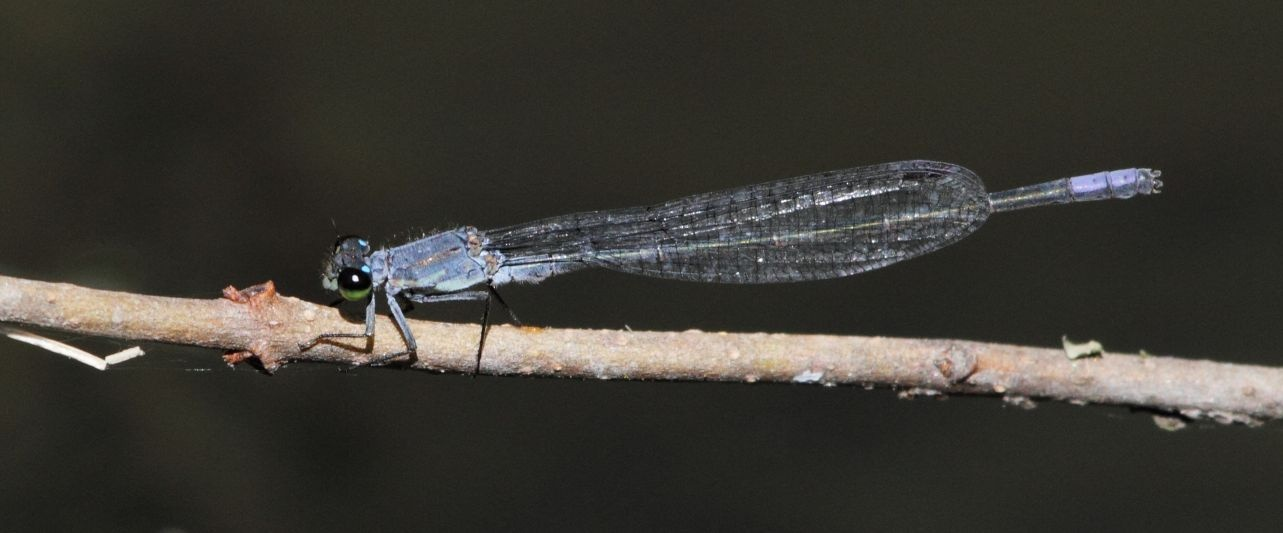
Old male

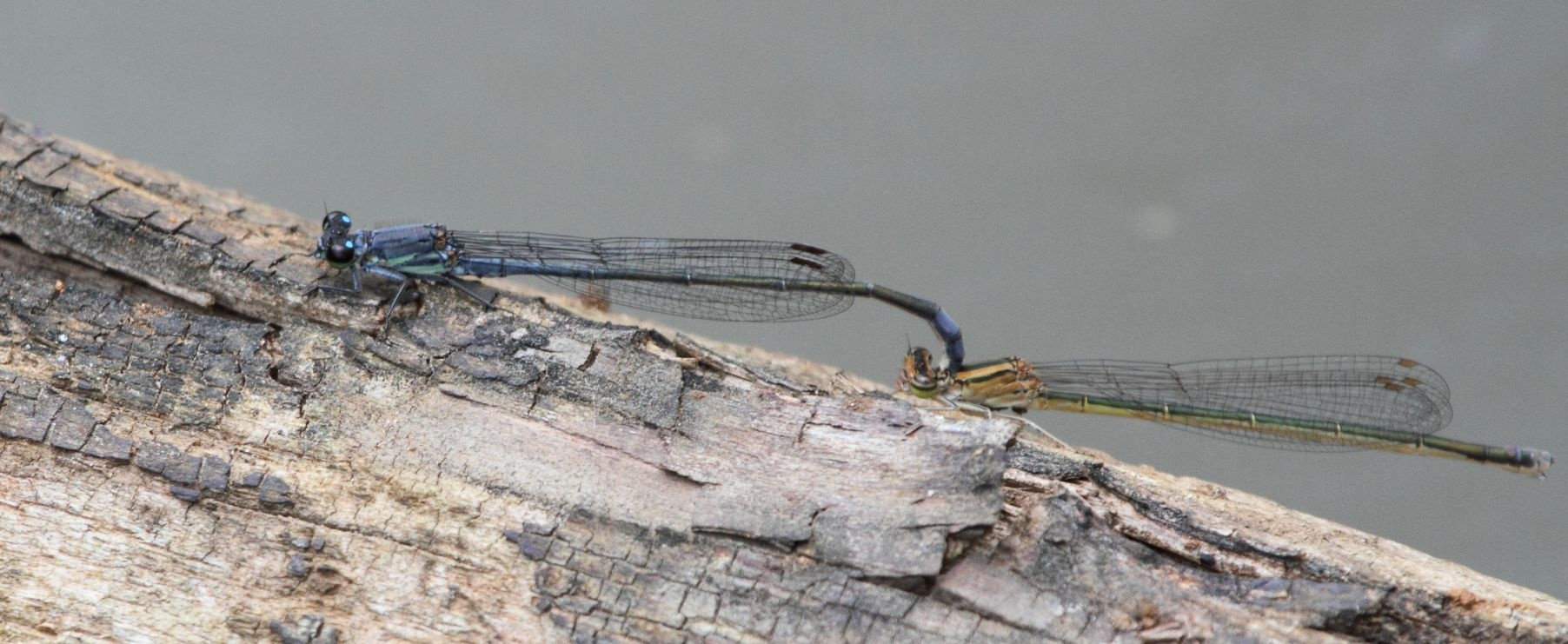
Pair

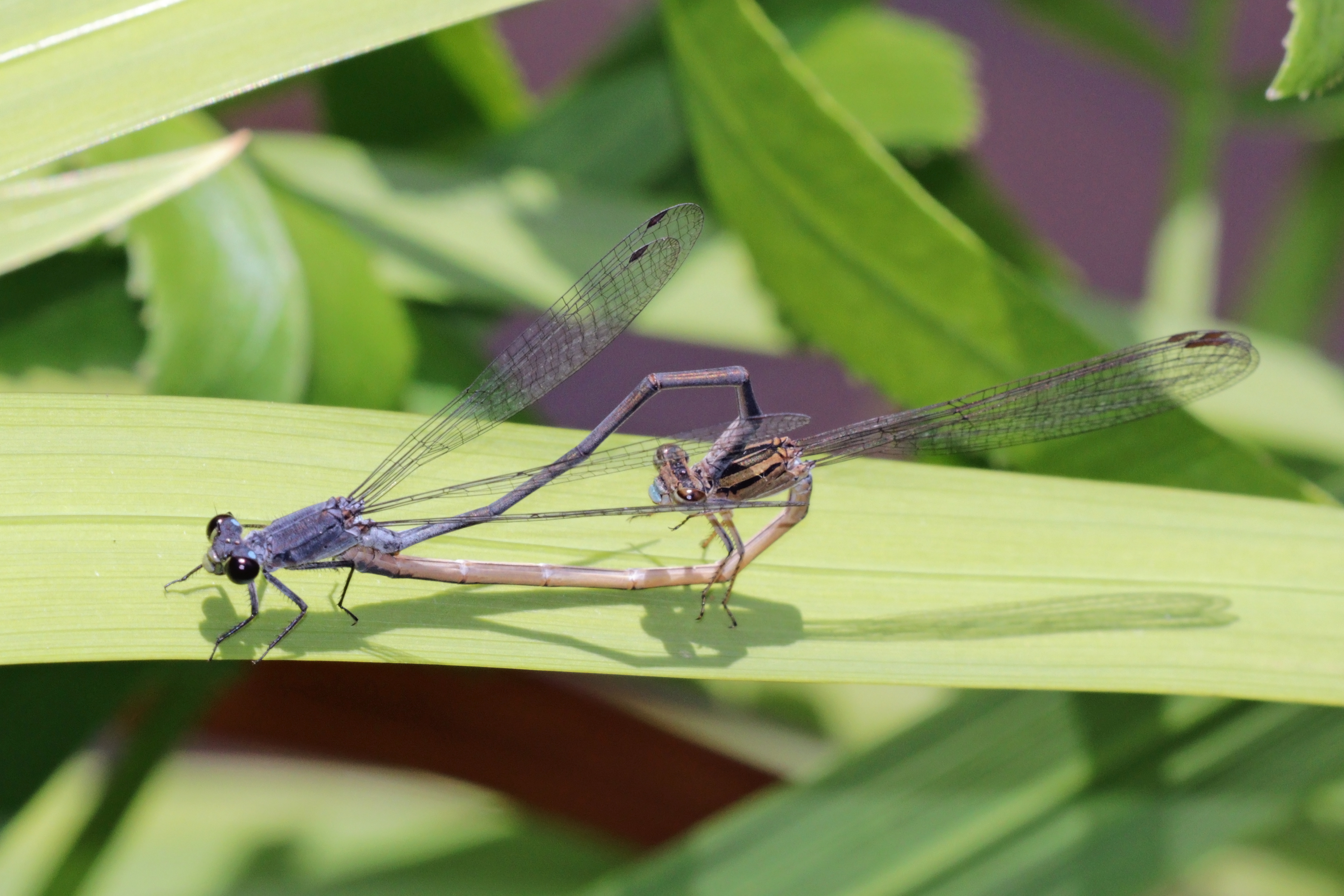
mating
