= Pseudagrion camerunense =

Conservation status
- Least Concern (IUCN 3.1)

Scientific classification
- Kingdom: Animalia
- Phylum: Arthropoda
- Clade: Pancrustacea
- Class: Insecta
- Order: Odonata
- Suborder: Zygoptera
- Family: Coenagrionidae
- Genus: Pseudagrion
- Species: P. camerunense

Binomial name
- Pseudagrion camerunense (Karsch, 1899)

Synonyms
- Enallagma camerunense Karsch, 1899

Species of damselfly

Pseudagrion camerunense is a species of damselfly in the family Coenagrionidae. It is found in Benin, Cameroon, Côte d'Ivoire, Ghana, Guinea, Guinea-Bissau, Nigeria, and Togo. Its natural habitat is rivers.
