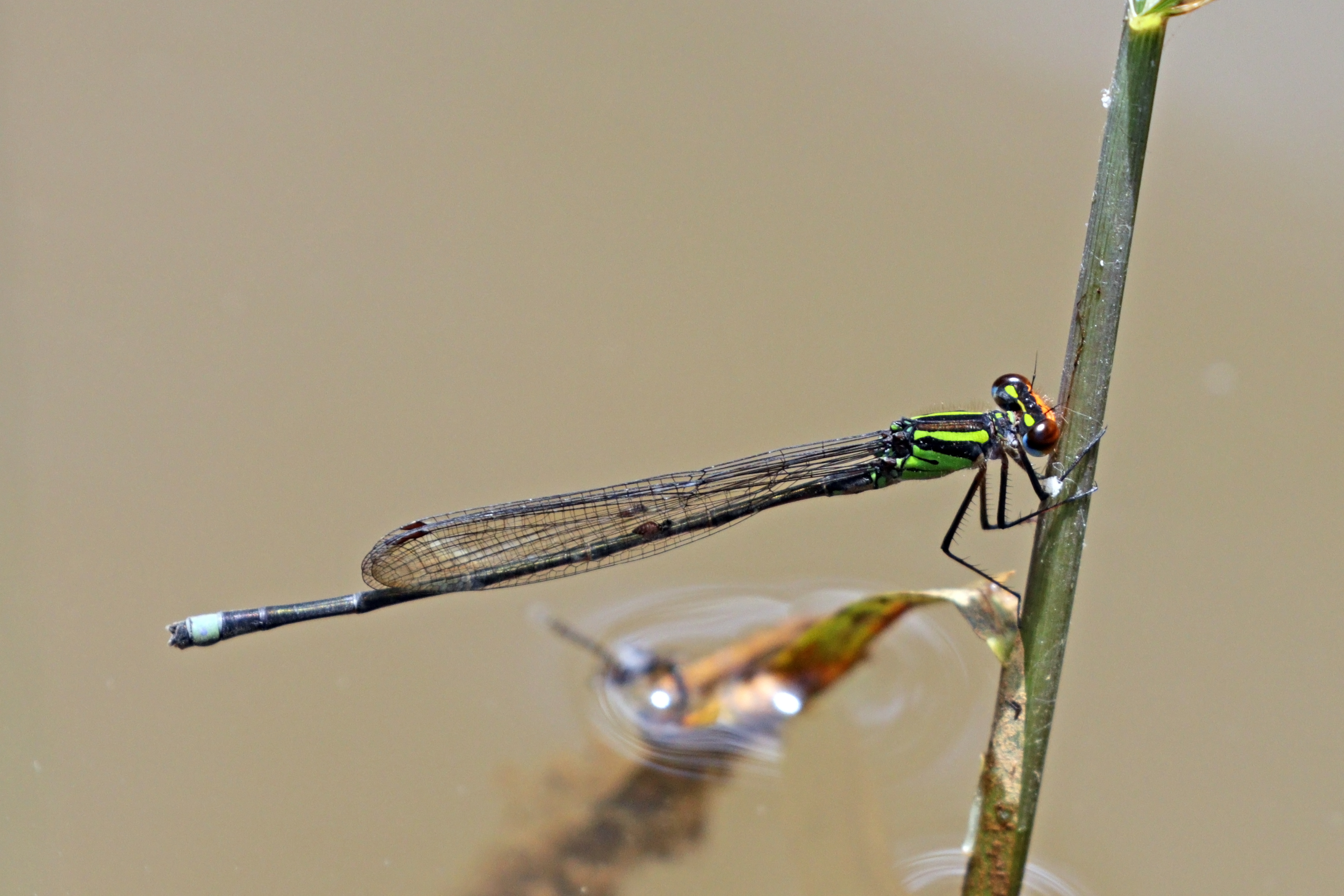

Conservation status
- Least Concern (IUCN 3.1)

Scientific classification
- Kingdom: Animalia
- Phylum: Arthropoda
- Clade: Pancrustacea
- Class: Insecta
- Order: Odonata
- Suborder: Zygoptera
- Family: Coenagrionidae
- Genus: Pseudagrion
- Species: P. dispar

Binomial name
- Pseudagrion dispar Fraser, 1949

= Pseudagrion dispar =

Species of insect

Pseudagrion dispar is a species of Pseudagrion found in Madagascar.
