= Pseudagrion inconspicuum =

Conservation status
- Least Concern (IUCN 3.1)

Scientific classification
- Kingdom: Animalia
- Phylum: Arthropoda
- Clade: Pancrustacea
- Class: Insecta
- Order: Odonata
- Suborder: Zygoptera
- Family: Coenagrionidae
- Genus: Pseudagrion
- Species: P. inconspicuum

Binomial name
- Pseudagrion inconspicuum Ris, 1931

Species of damselfly

Pseudagrion inconspicuum is a species of damselfly in the family Coenagrionidae. It is found in Angola, the Democratic Republic of the Congo, Malawi, South Africa, Zambia, and possibly Tanzania. Its natural habitats are subtropical or tropical high-altitude grassland, rivers, and swamps.
