= Pseudagrion lindicum =

Conservation status
- Least Concern (IUCN 3.1)

Scientific classification
- Kingdom: Animalia
- Phylum: Arthropoda
- Clade: Pancrustacea
- Class: Insecta
- Order: Odonata
- Suborder: Zygoptera
- Family: Coenagrionidae
- Genus: Pseudagrion
- Species: P. lindicum

Binomial name
- Pseudagrion lindicum Grünberg, 1902

Species of damselfly

Pseudagrion lindicum is a species of damselfly in the family Coenagrionidae. It is found in Kenya, Mozambique, Somalia, Tanzania, and possibly Uganda. Its natural habitats are subtropical or tropical moist lowland forests, subtropical or tropical dry shrubland, subtropical or tropical moist shrubland, rivers, intermittent rivers, freshwater marshes, and intermittent freshwater marshes.
