= Pseudagrion assegaii =

Conservation status
- Least Concern (IUCN 3.1)

Scientific classification
- Kingdom: Animalia
- Phylum: Arthropoda
- Clade: Pancrustacea
- Class: Insecta
- Order: Odonata
- Suborder: Zygoptera
- Family: Coenagrionidae
- Genus: Pseudagrion
- Species: P. assegaii

Binomial name
- Pseudagrion assegaii Pinhey, 1950

Species of damselfly

Pseudagrion assegaii is a species of damselfly in the family Coenagrionidae. It is found in Botswana, Namibia, South Africa, Uganda, Zambia, and Zimbabwe.

== Habitat ==
Its natural habitats include swamps and pools, especially pools with grass fringes, lilies and some shade. Its continued existence is threatened by habitat loss through agricultural development and groundwater extraction.
