= Pseudagrion glaucoideum =

Conservation status
- Least Concern (IUCN 3.1)

Scientific classification
- Kingdom: Animalia
- Phylum: Arthropoda
- Clade: Pancrustacea
- Class: Insecta
- Order: Odonata
- Suborder: Zygoptera
- Family: Coenagrionidae
- Genus: Pseudagrion
- Species: P. glaucoideum

Binomial name
- Pseudagrion glaucoideum Schmidt in Ris, 1936

Species of damselfly

Pseudagrion glaucoideum is a species of damselfly in the family Coenagrionidae. It is found in the Republic of the Congo, the Democratic Republic of the Congo, Equatorial Guinea, Gabon, Ghana, Liberia, Nigeria, and Uganda. Its natural habitats are subtropical or tropical moist lowland forests and rivers.
