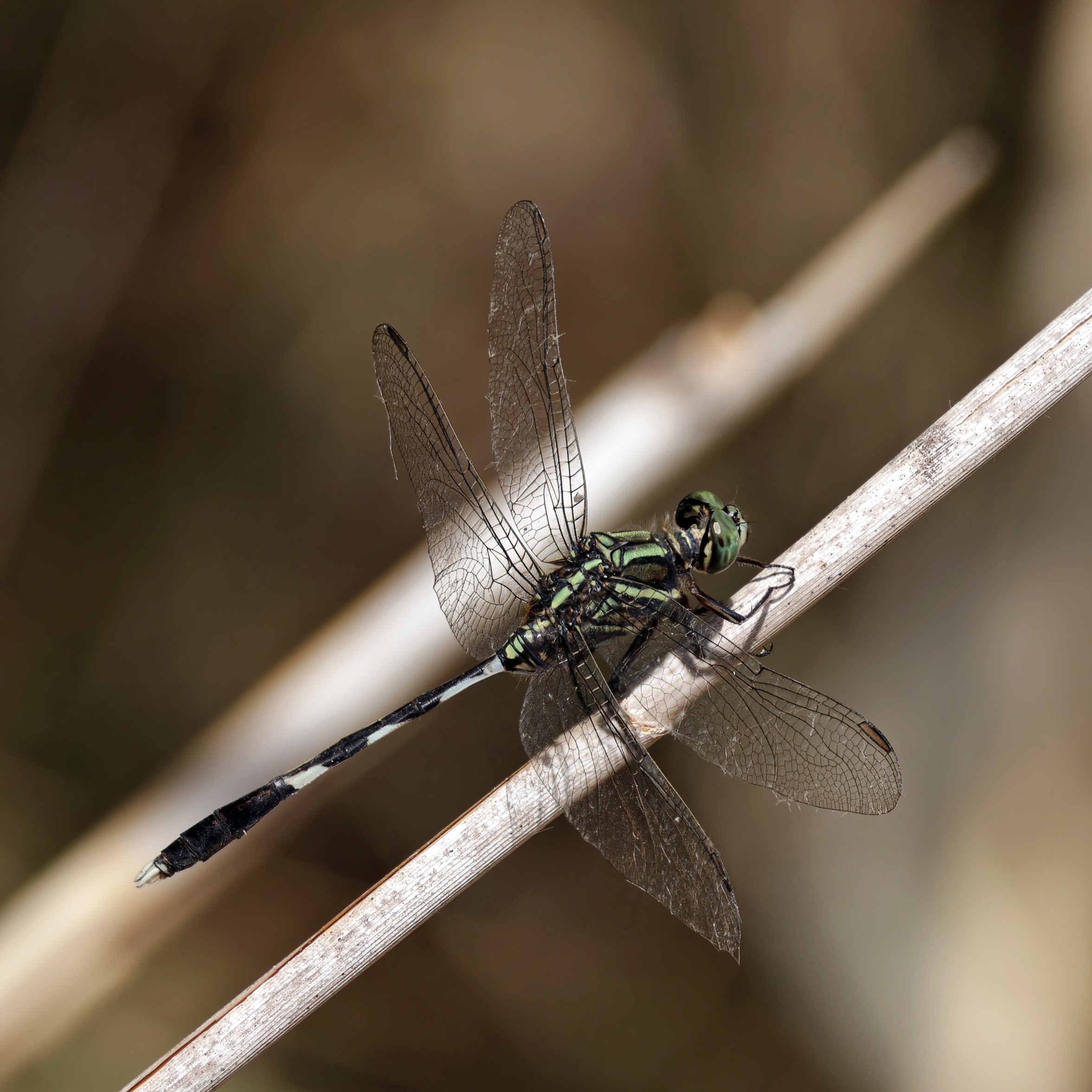
- Male, Cyprus
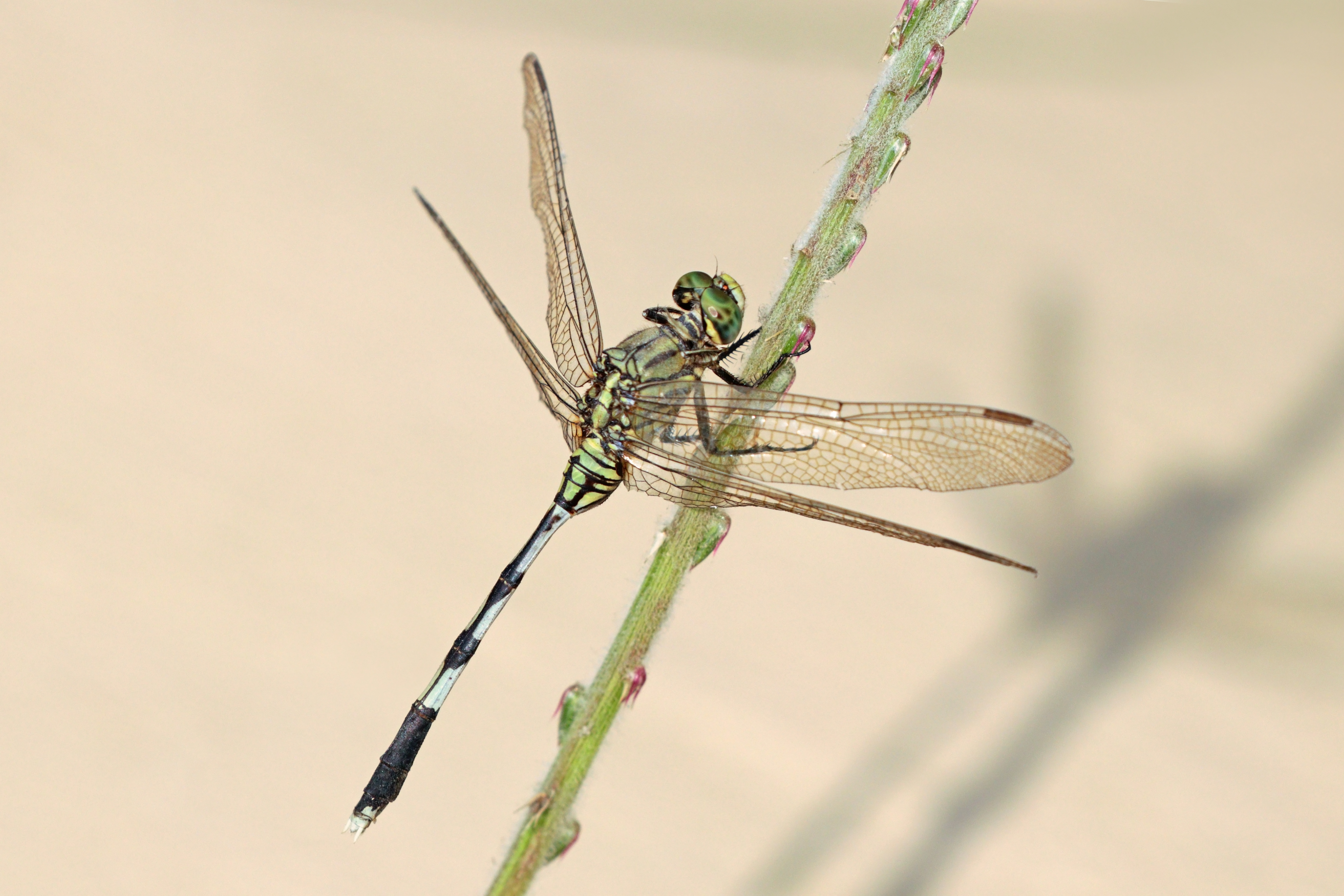
- Female, Nepal

Conservation status
- Least Concern (IUCN 3.1)

Scientific classification
- Kingdom: Animalia
- Phylum: Arthropoda
- Clade: Pancrustacea
- Class: Insecta
- Order: Odonata
- Infraorder: Anisoptera
- Family: Libellulidae
- Genus: Orthetrum
- Species: O. sabina

Binomial name
- Orthetrum sabina (Drury, 1770)

Synonyms
- Libellula sabina Drury, 1770; Libellula gibba Fabricius, 1798; Libellua leptura Burmeister, 1839; Libellula ampullacea Schneider, 1845; Lepthemis divisa Selys, 1878; Orthetrum nigrescens Bartenev, 1929; Orthetrum viduatum Lieftinck, 1942

= Orthetrum sabina =

Species of dragonfly

Orthetrum sabina, the slender skimmer or green marsh hawk, is a species of dragonfly in the family Libellulidae. It is widespread, being found from south-eastern Europe and North Africa to Japan and south to Australia and Micronesia.

== Description and habitat ==
It is a medium-sized dragonfly with a wingspan of 60-85mm. Adults are greyish to greenish yellow with black and pale markings and green eyes. Its abdomen is greenish-yellow, marked with black. It is very similar to Orthetrum serapia in appearance, with both species appearing in northern Australia. Pale markings on segment four of the abdomen do not extend into the posterior section when viewed from above on Orthetrum sabina. Females are similar to males in shape, colour and size; differing only in sexual characteristics. This dragonfly perches motionless on shrubs and dry twigs for long periods. It preys voraciously on smaller butterflies and dragonflies.

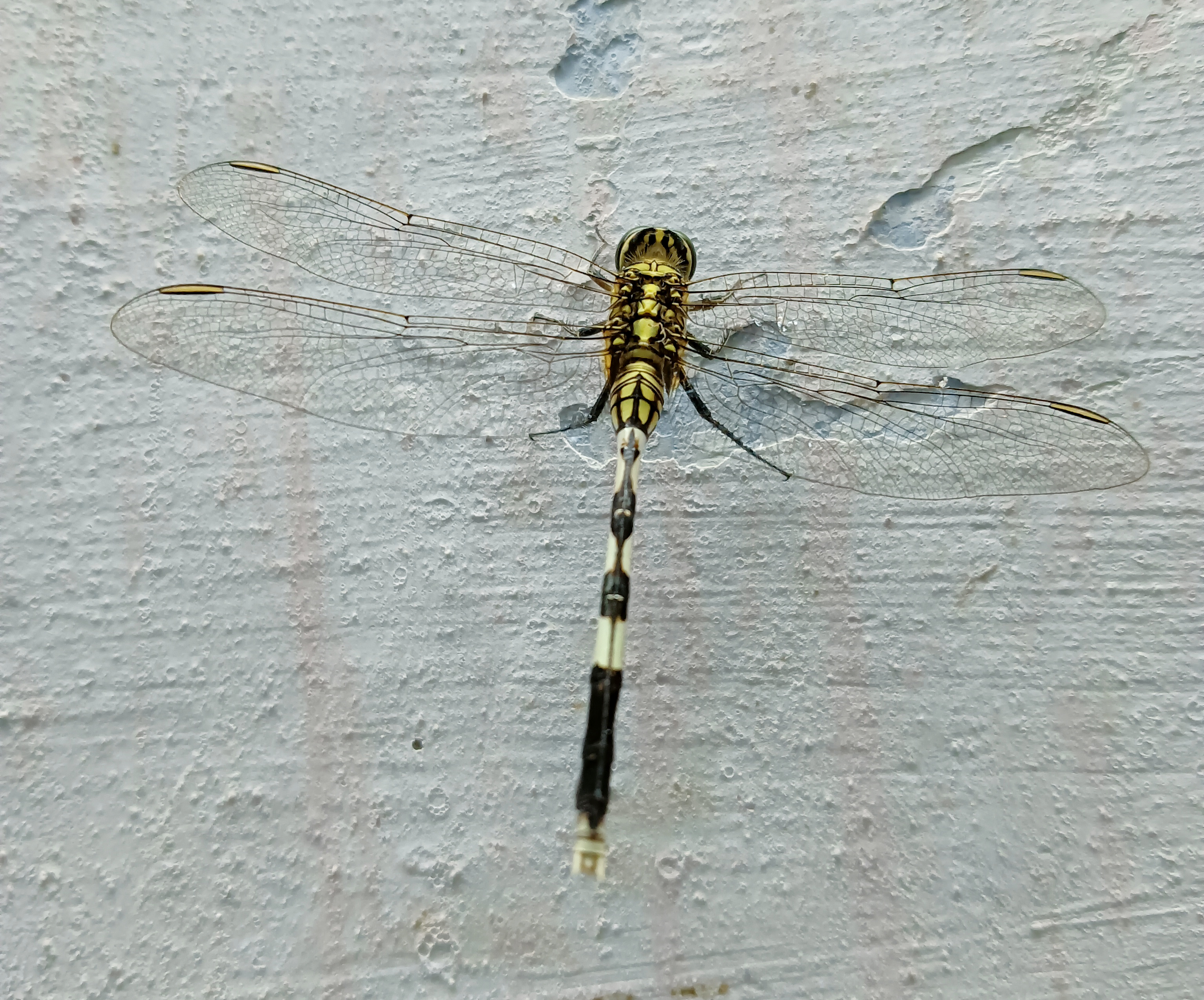
Orthetrum sabina, Libellulidae: Odonata. Taken at Rabindra Abas, Bidhan Chandra Krishi Vishwavidyalaya, Mohanpur, Nadia, West Bengal, India

== Etymology ==
The genus name Orthetrum is derived from the Greek ὀρθός (orthos, "straight") and ἦτρον (ētron, "abdomen"), referring to the parallel-sided abdomen of the genus.

The species name sabina is possibly named for Saint Sabina.

== Gallery ==
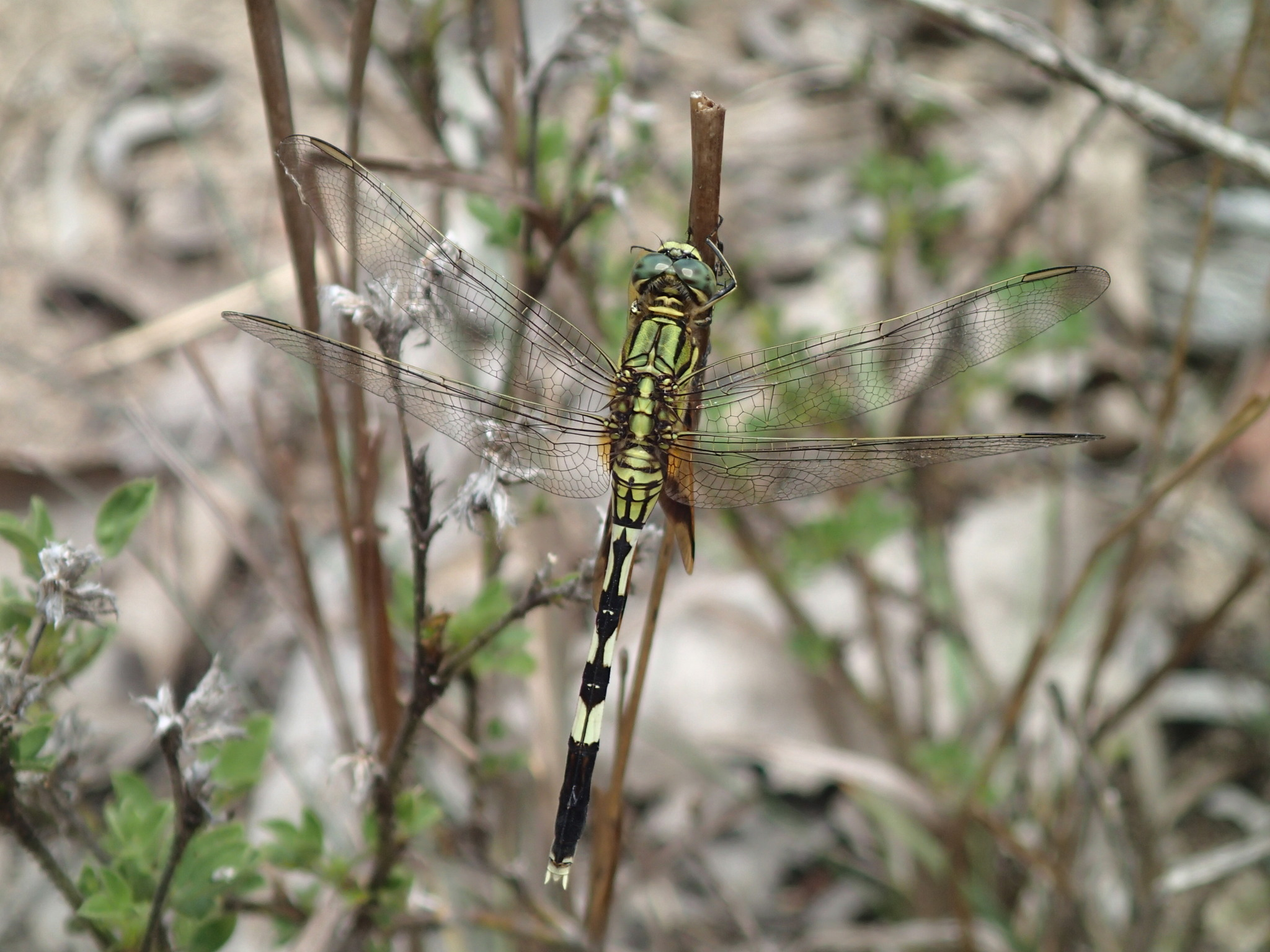
Female

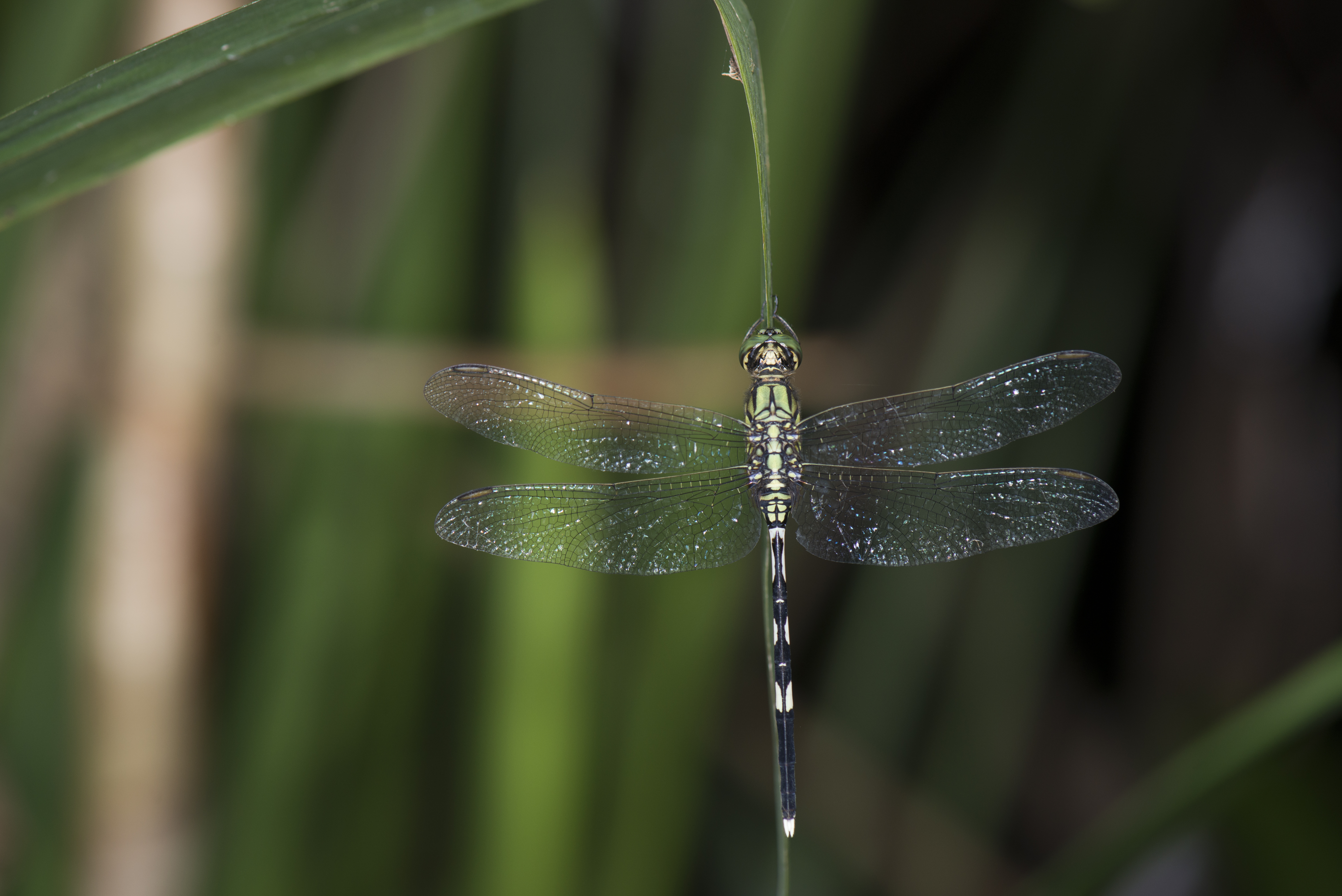
Male

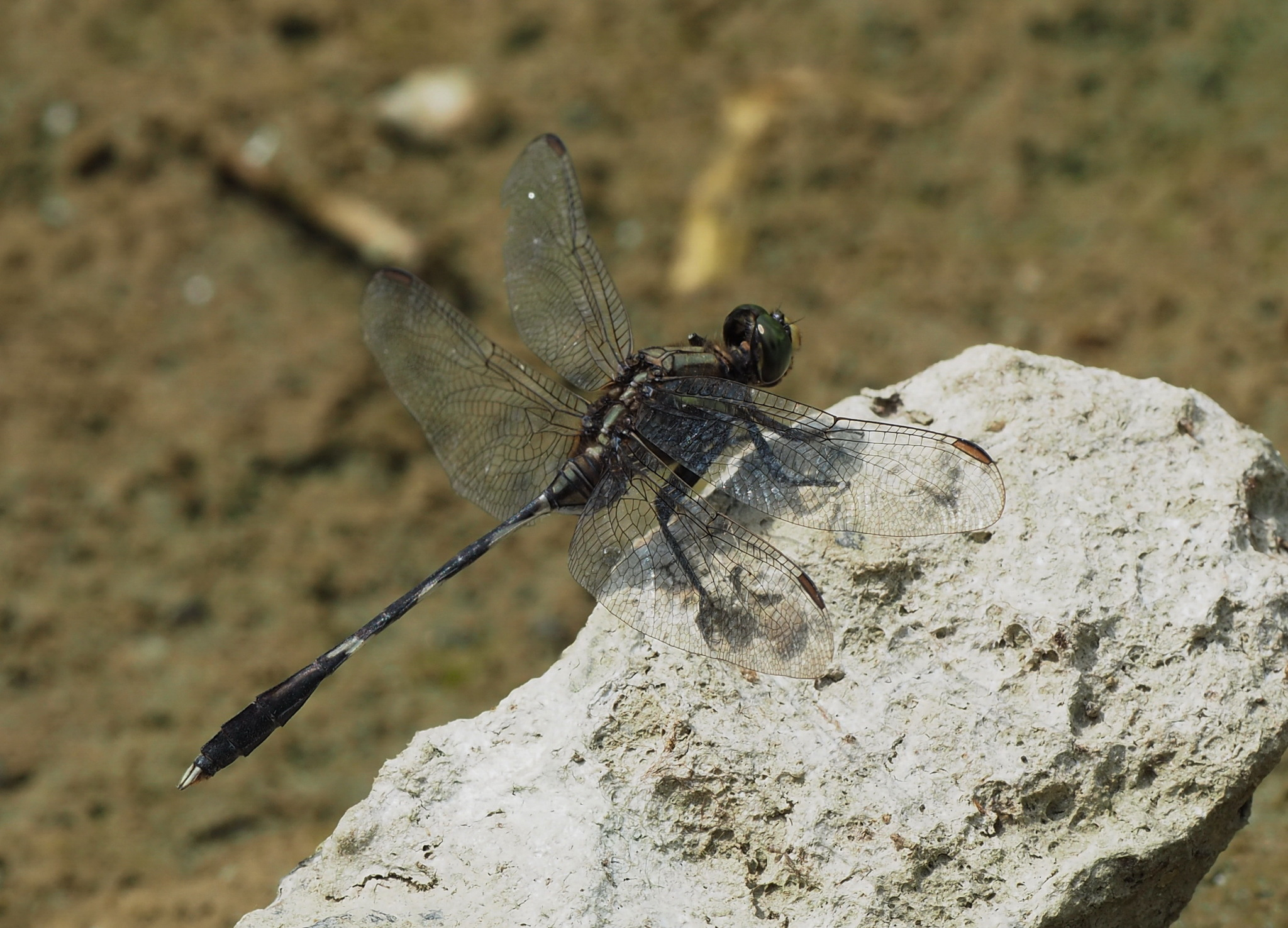
Old male with darkened abdomen and thorax

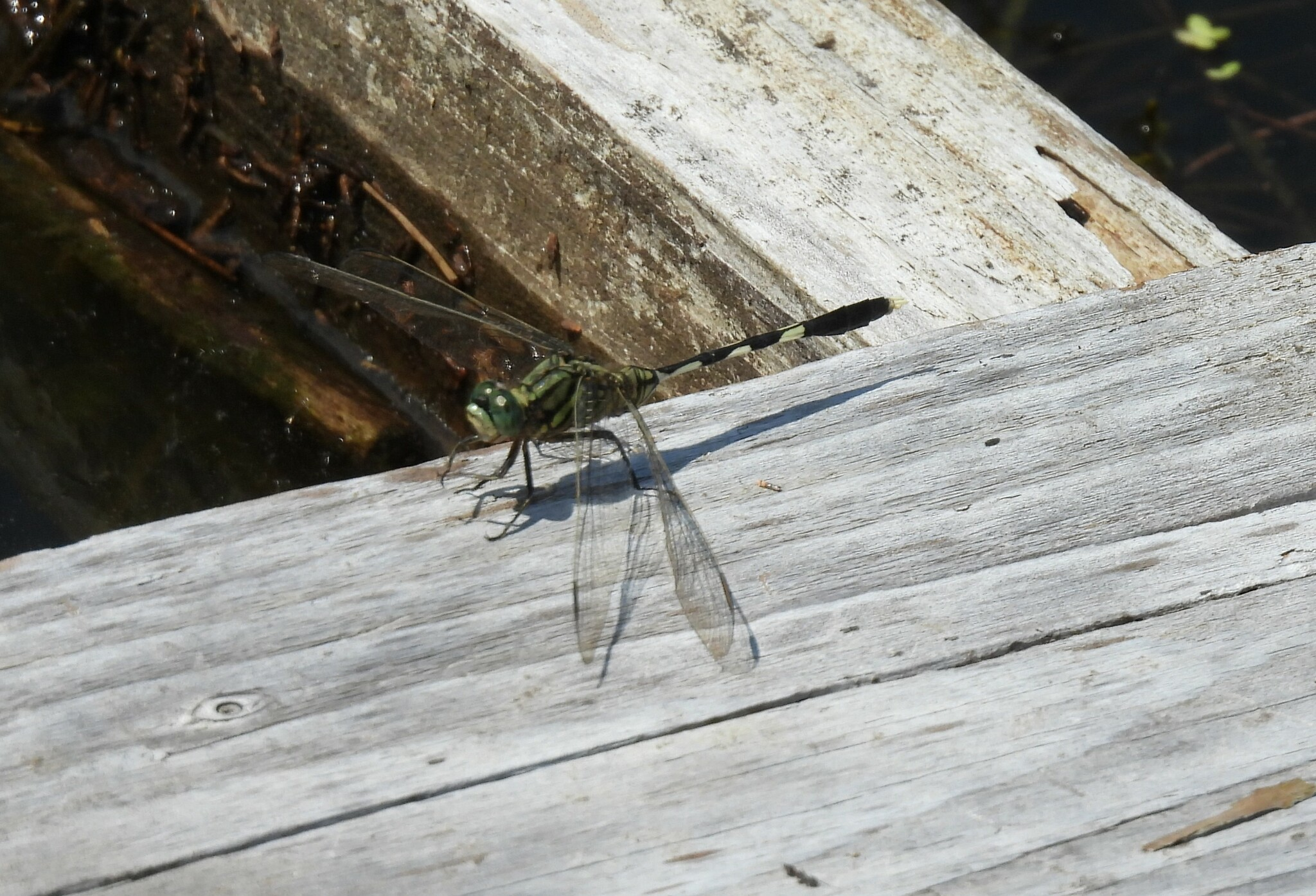
Male

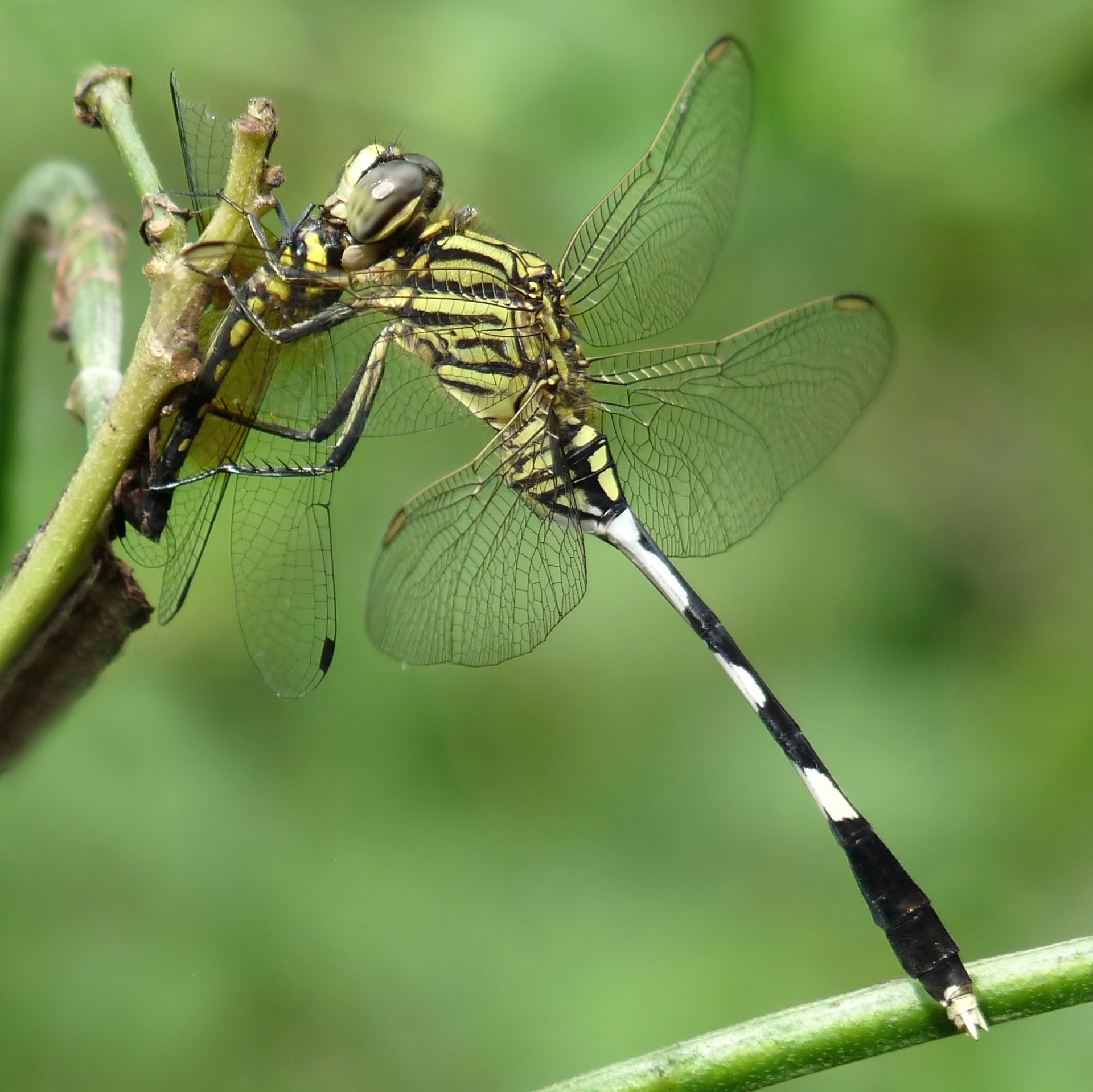
Orthetrum sabina feeding on Tetrathemis platyptera

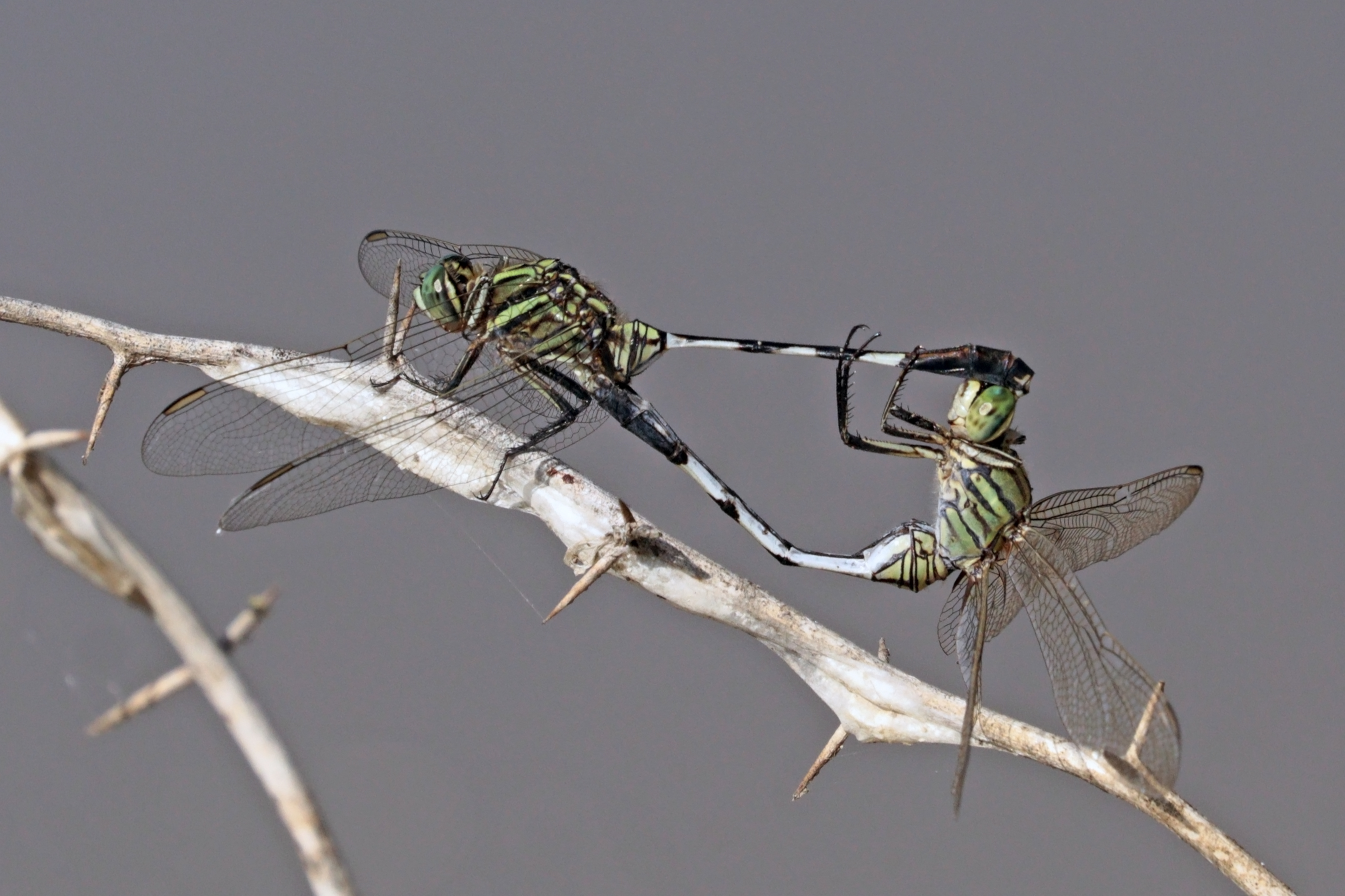
Mating pair

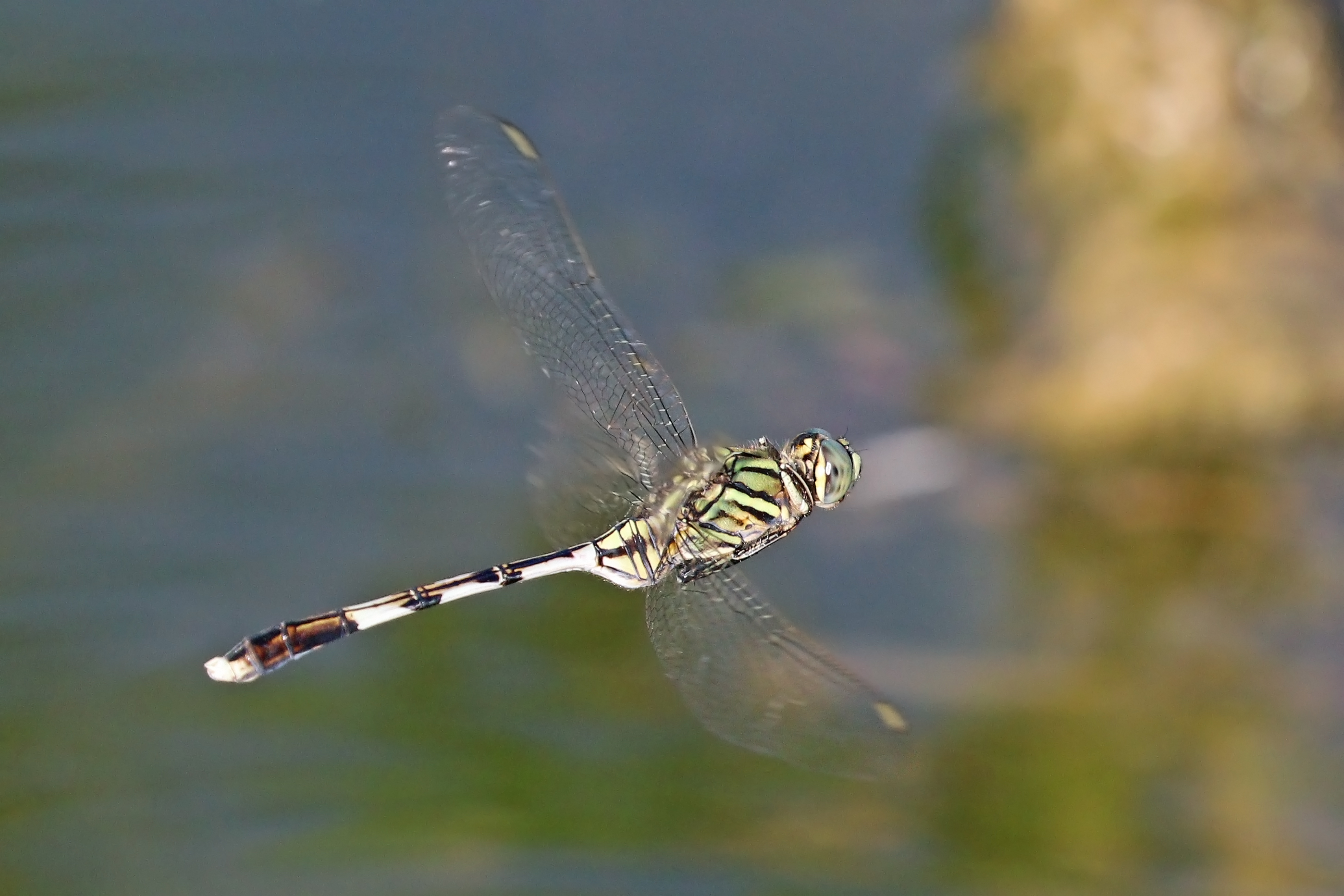
in flight

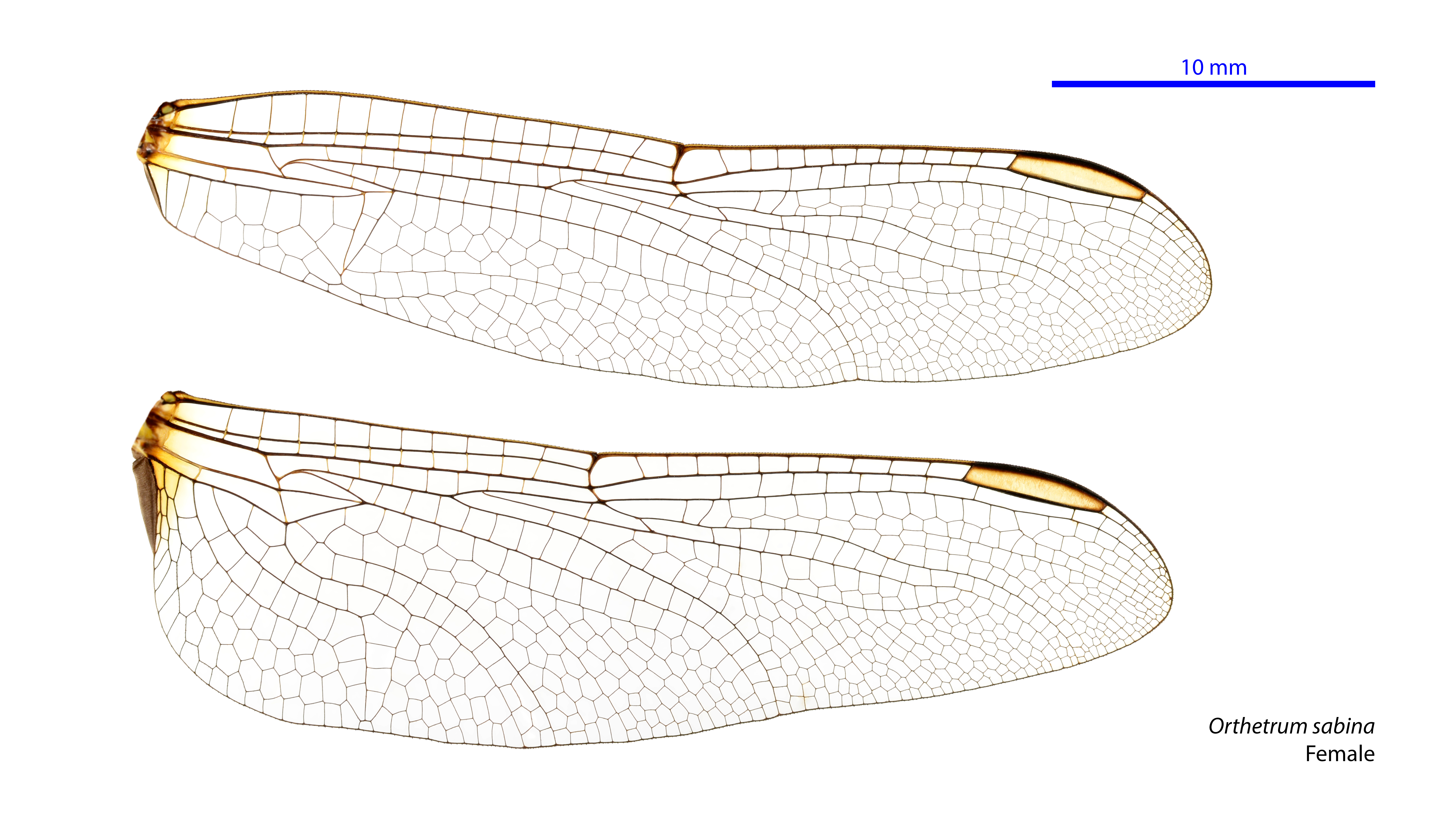
Female wings

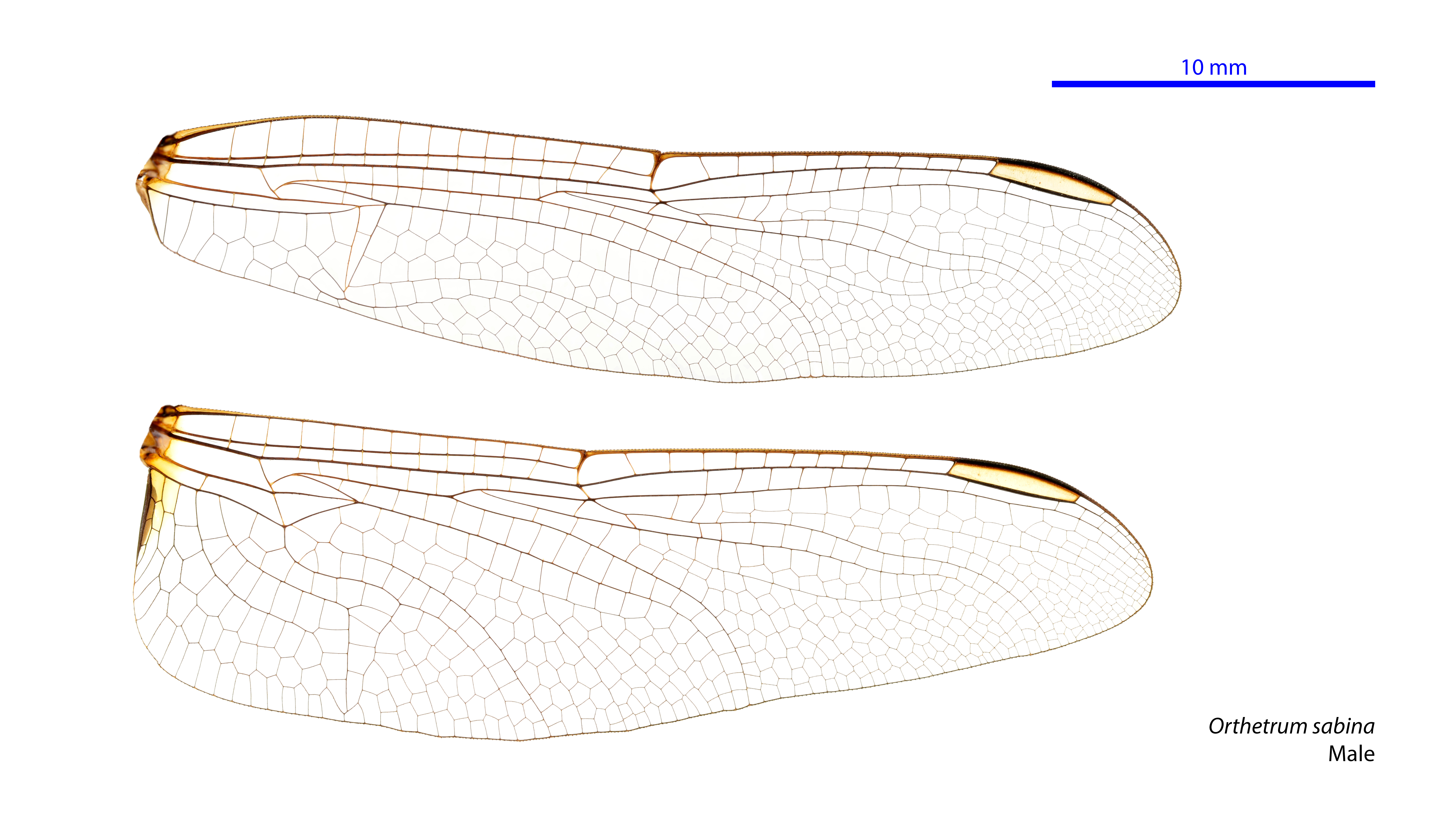
Male wings

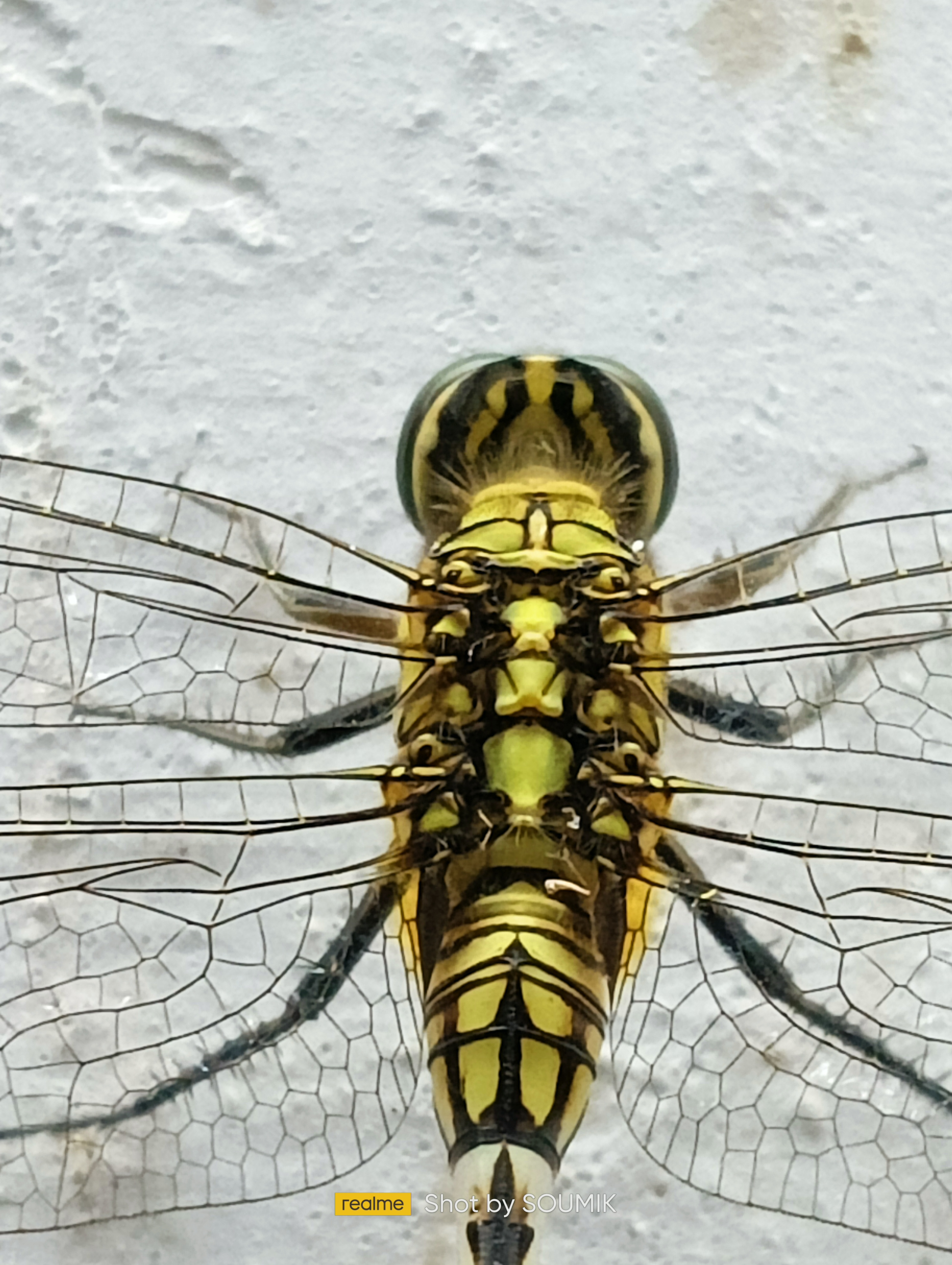
Wing Sclerites and Dorsum of Thorax

== See also ==
- List of odonates of Sri Lanka
- List of odonates of India
- List of odonata of Kerala
- List of Odonata species of Australia
