= Tetrathemis camerunensis =

Conservation status
- Least Concern (IUCN 3.1)

Scientific classification
- Kingdom: Animalia
- Phylum: Arthropoda
- Class: Insecta
- Order: Odonata
- Infraorder: Anisoptera
- Family: Libellulidae
- Genus: Tetrathemis
- Species: T. camerunensis

Binomial name
- Tetrathemis camerunensis (Sjöstedt, 1900)

Species of dragonfly

Tetrathemis camerunensis is a species of dragonfly in the family Libellulidae. It is found in Benin, Cameroon, Central African Republic, the Democratic Republic of the Congo, Ivory Coast, Equatorial Guinea, Gabon, Gambia, Ghana, Guinea, Liberia, Nigeria, Togo, and Uganda. Its natural habitats are subtropical or tropical moist lowland forests and shrub-dominated wetlands.
