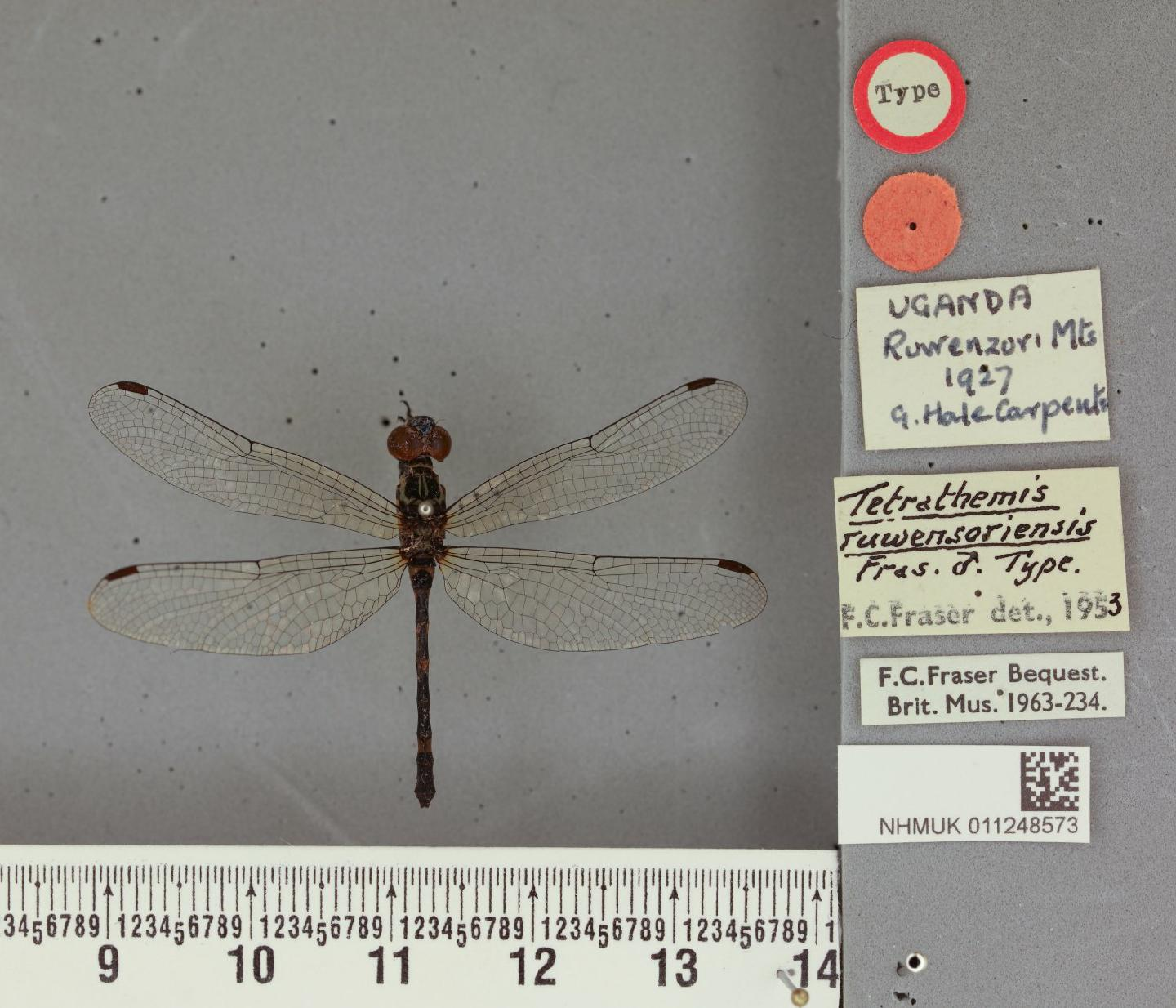

Conservation status
- Data Deficient (IUCN 3.1)

Scientific classification
- Kingdom: Animalia
- Phylum: Arthropoda
- Class: Insecta
- Order: Odonata
- Infraorder: Anisoptera
- Family: Libellulidae
- Genus: Tetrathemis
- Species: T. ruwensoriensis

Binomial name
- Tetrathemis ruwensoriensis Fraser, 1941

= Tetrathemis ruwensoriensis =

Species of dragonfly

Tetrathemis ruwensoriensis is a species of dragonfly in the family Libellulidae. It is endemic to Uganda. Its natural habitats are subtropical or tropical moist montane forests and rivers. It is threatened by habitat loss.
