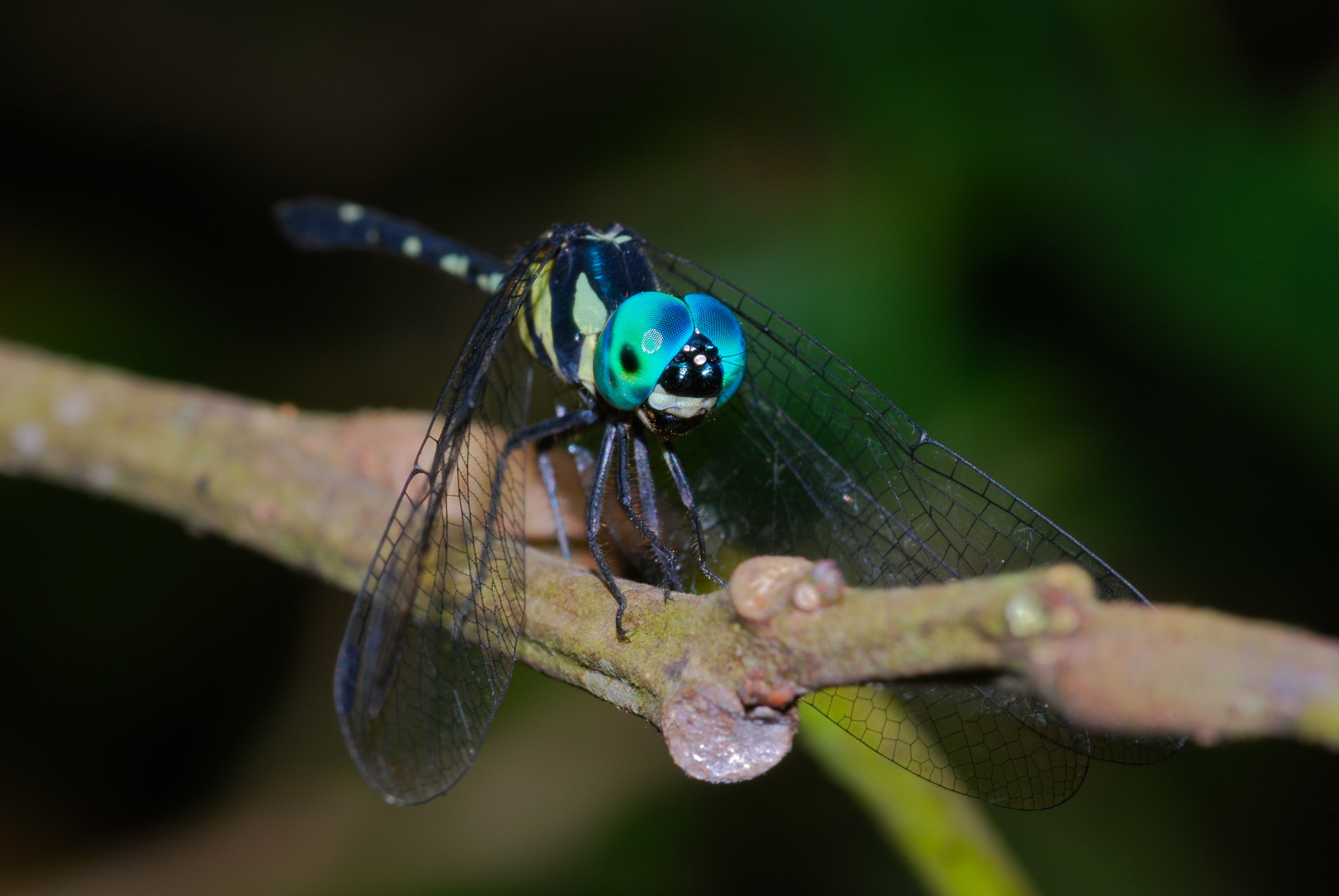
- Tetrathemis irregularis, Malaysia

Conservation status
- Least Concern (IUCN 3.1)

Scientific classification
- Kingdom: Animalia
- Phylum: Arthropoda
- Clade: Pancrustacea
- Class: Insecta
- Order: Odonata
- Infraorder: Anisoptera
- Family: Libellulidae
- Genus: Tetrathemis
- Species: T. irregularis

Binomial name
- Tetrathemis irregularis Brauer, 1868

Synonyms
- Tetrathemis tristrigata Kirby, 1889; Tetrathemis sumatrana Krüger, 1902; Tetrathemis cladophila Tillyard, 1908

= Tetrathemis irregularis =

Species of dragonfly

Tetrathemis irregularis is a species of dragonfly in the family Libellulidae, known as the rainforest elf. It is a tiny to small, slender dragonfly with black and yellow markings. It inhabits rainforest streams in north-eastern Australia and Southeast Asia, including the Aru Islands.

== Subspecies ==
The species Tetrathemis irregularis includes the following subspecies:

- Tetrathemis irregularis irregularis Brauer, 1868 - found in South-east Asia and New Guinea
- Tetrathemis irregularis cladophila Tillyard, 1908 - found in Australia and the Aru islands

== Etymology ==
The genus name Tetrathemis is derived from the Greek τετρα- (tetra, "four") and -themis, from Greek Θέμις (Themis), the goddess of divine law, order and justice. In early odonate taxonomy, names ending in -themis were widely used for dragonflies. The name refers to the apparently four-sided triangle in the wings.

The species name irregularis is derived from the Latin in- ("not") and regularis ("regular" or "orderly"). The name also refers to the irregular four-sided triangle in the wings.

== See also ==
- List of Odonata species of Australia
