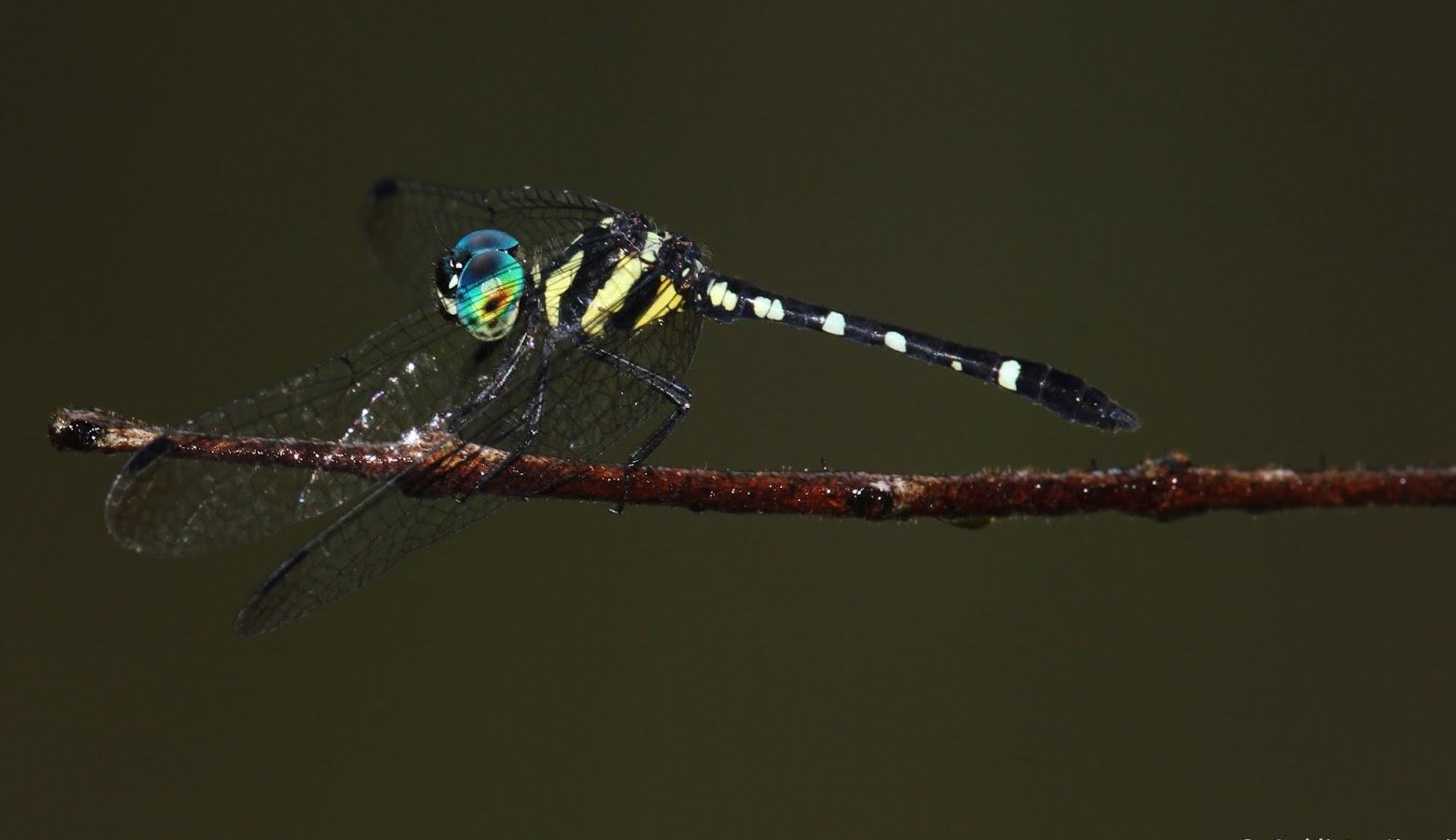

Conservation status
- Vulnerable (IUCN 3.1)

Scientific classification
- Kingdom: Animalia
- Phylum: Arthropoda
- Class: Insecta
- Order: Odonata
- Infraorder: Anisoptera
- Family: Libellulidae
- Genus: Tetrathemis
- Species: T. yerburii

Binomial name
- Tetrathemis yerburii Kirby, 1894

= Tetrathemis yerburii =

Species of dragonfly

Tetrathemis yerburii is a species of dragonfly in the family Libellulidae. It is endemic to Sri Lanka. Its natural habitats are subtropical or tropical moist lowland forests and rivers. It is threatened by habitat loss.
