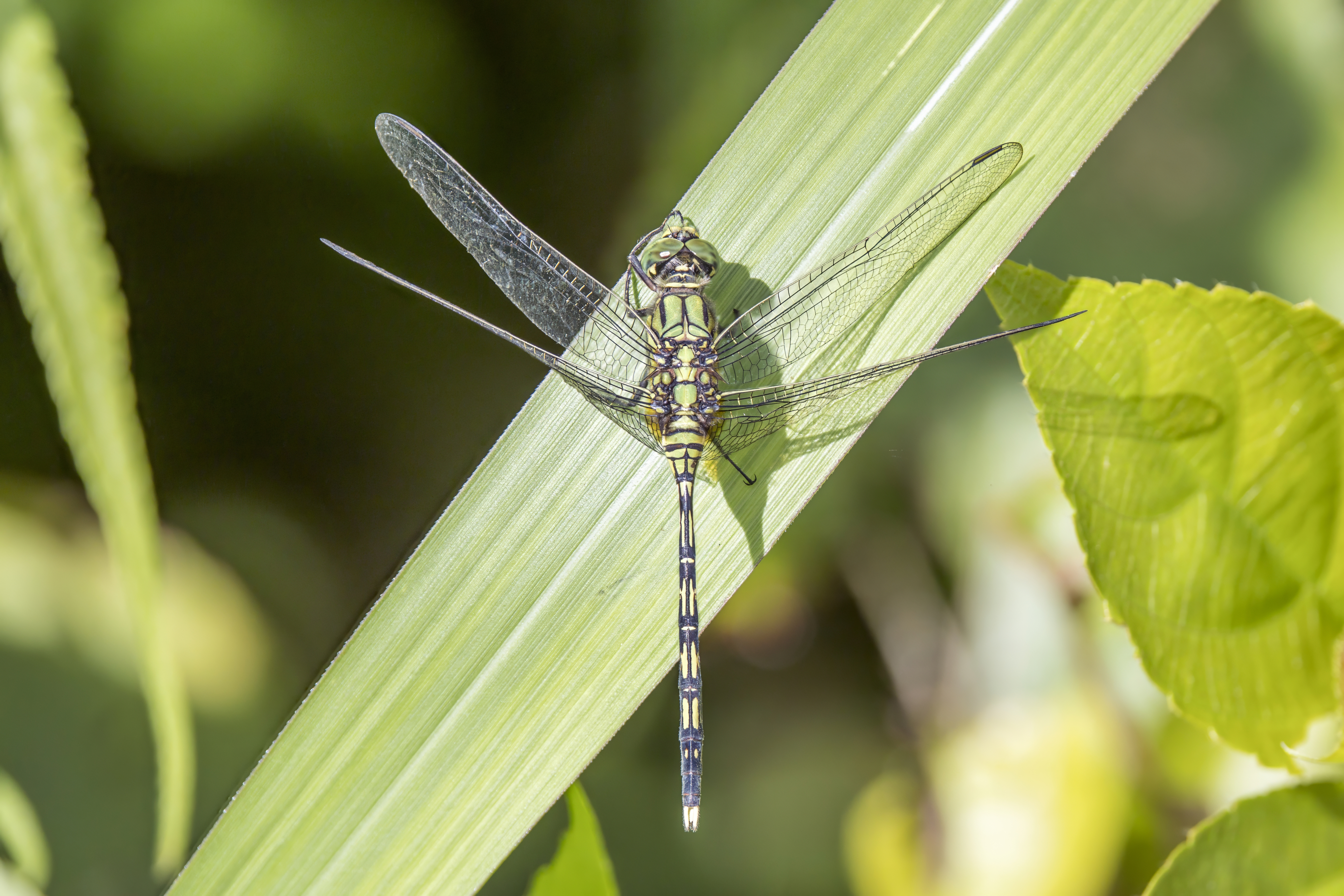
- Male, Bohol, Philippines
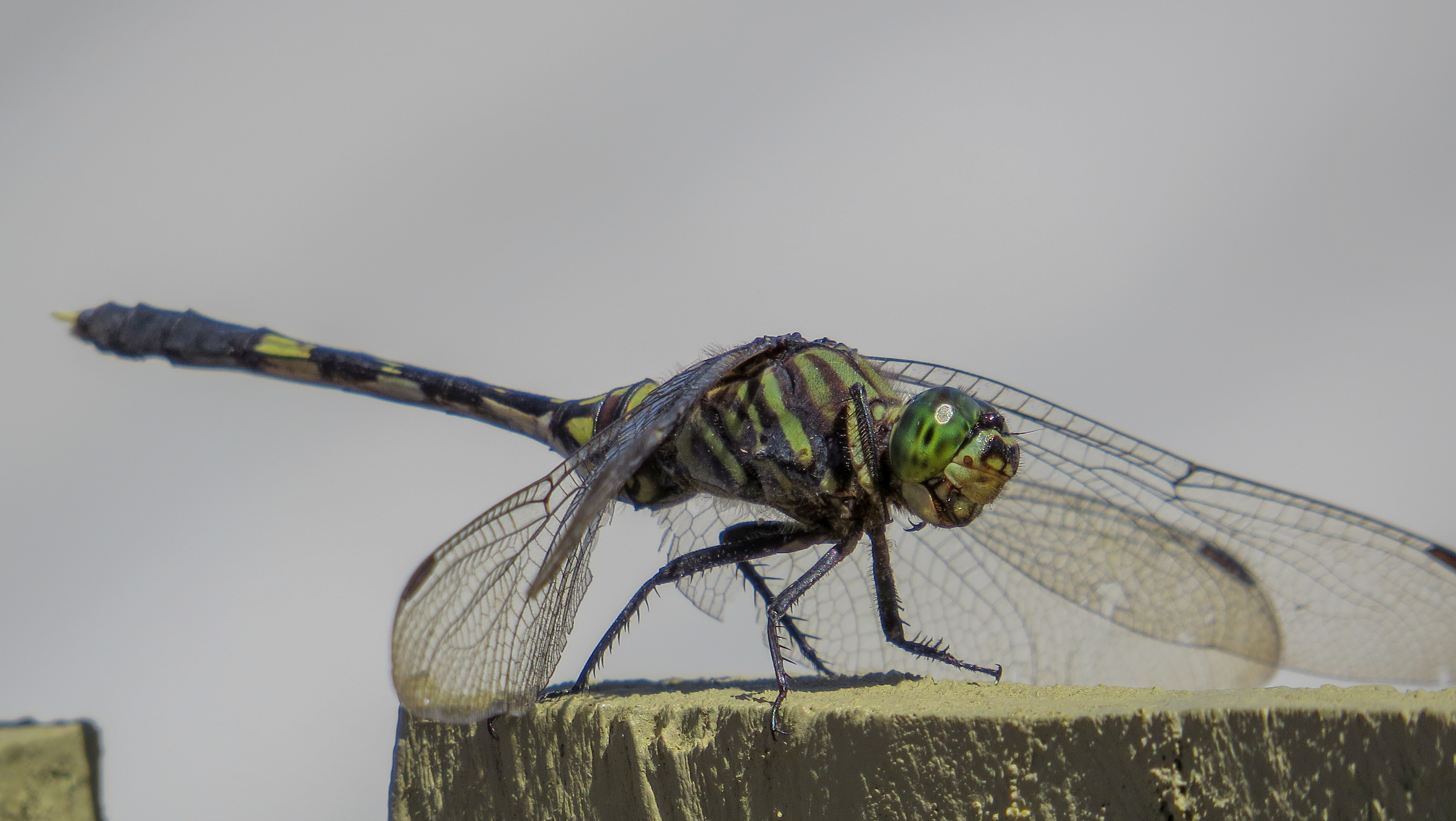
- Female

Conservation status
- Least Concern (IUCN 3.1)

Scientific classification
- Kingdom: Animalia
- Phylum: Arthropoda
- Clade: Pancrustacea
- Class: Insecta
- Order: Odonata
- Infraorder: Anisoptera
- Family: Libellulidae
- Genus: Orthetrum
- Species: O. serapia

Binomial name
- Orthetrum serapia Watson, 1984

= Orthetrum serapia =

Species of dragonfly

Orthetrum serapia, the green skimmer, is a freshwater dragonfly in the family Libellulidae. The serapia species is present in Australia, the Philippines, Fiji, Papua New Guinea and Solomon Islands. It inhabits a wide range of still and sluggish waters, often shallow. In Australia it ranges from the top end of the Northern Territory to about Mackay in central Queensland.

== Description ==
Orthetrum serapia is a medium-sized dragonfly with a wingspan of 60-85mm. Its wings are clear except for a small dark spot at the base of the hindwing. The thorax is greenish to greyish yellow with black markings. The abdomen is black with pale yellow or pale green markings. Orthetrum serapia appears very similar to Orthetrum sabina and can be confused where the range of the two overlaps in north-eastern Australia.

== Etymology ==
The genus name Orthetrum is derived from the Greek ὀρθός (orthos, "straight") and ἦτρον (ētron, "abdomen"), referring to the parallel-sided abdomen of the genus.

The species name serapia is an eponym honouring Saint Serapia, a slave, martyr, and servant of Saint Sabina.

== Gallery ==
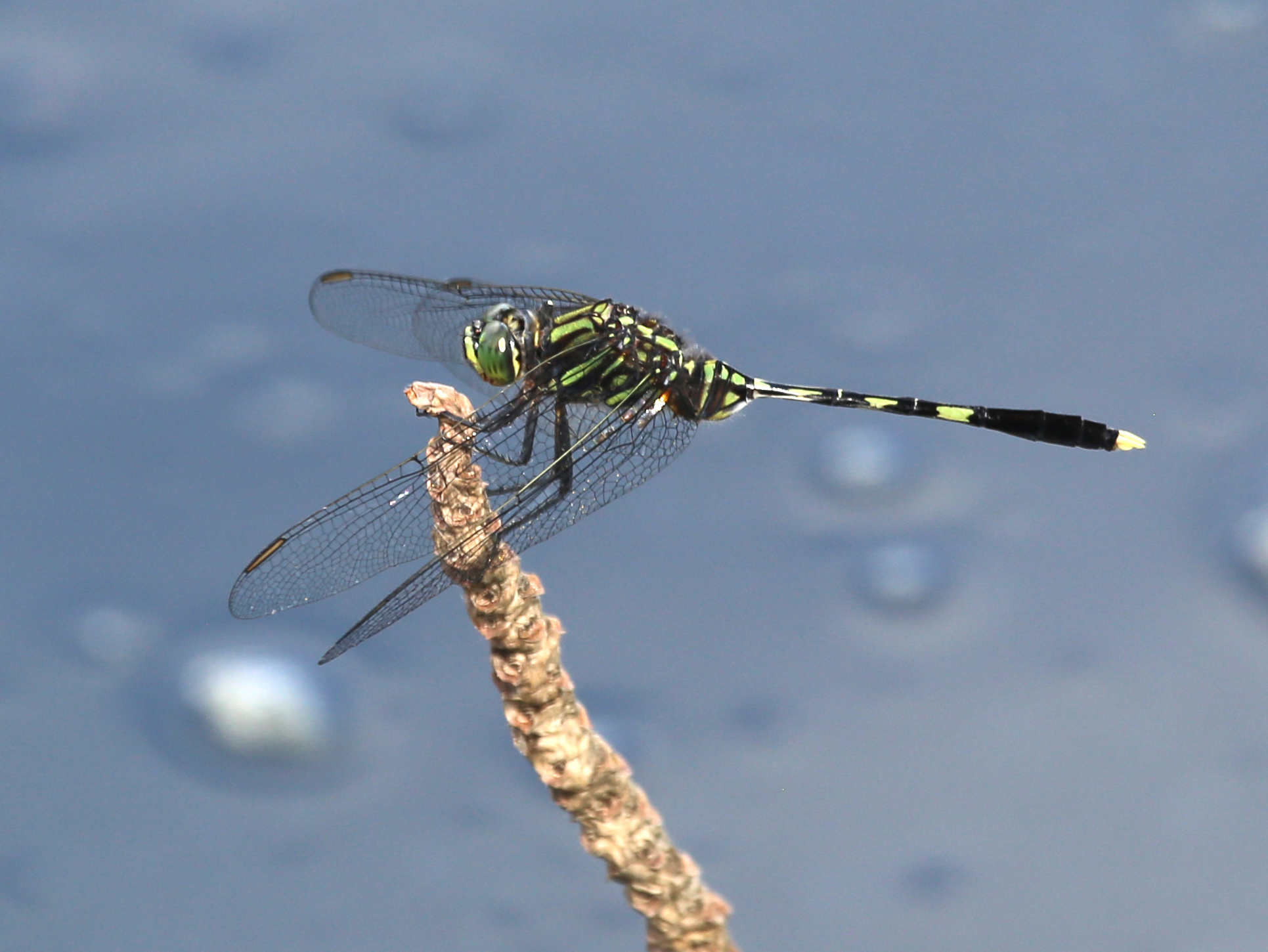
Male side view

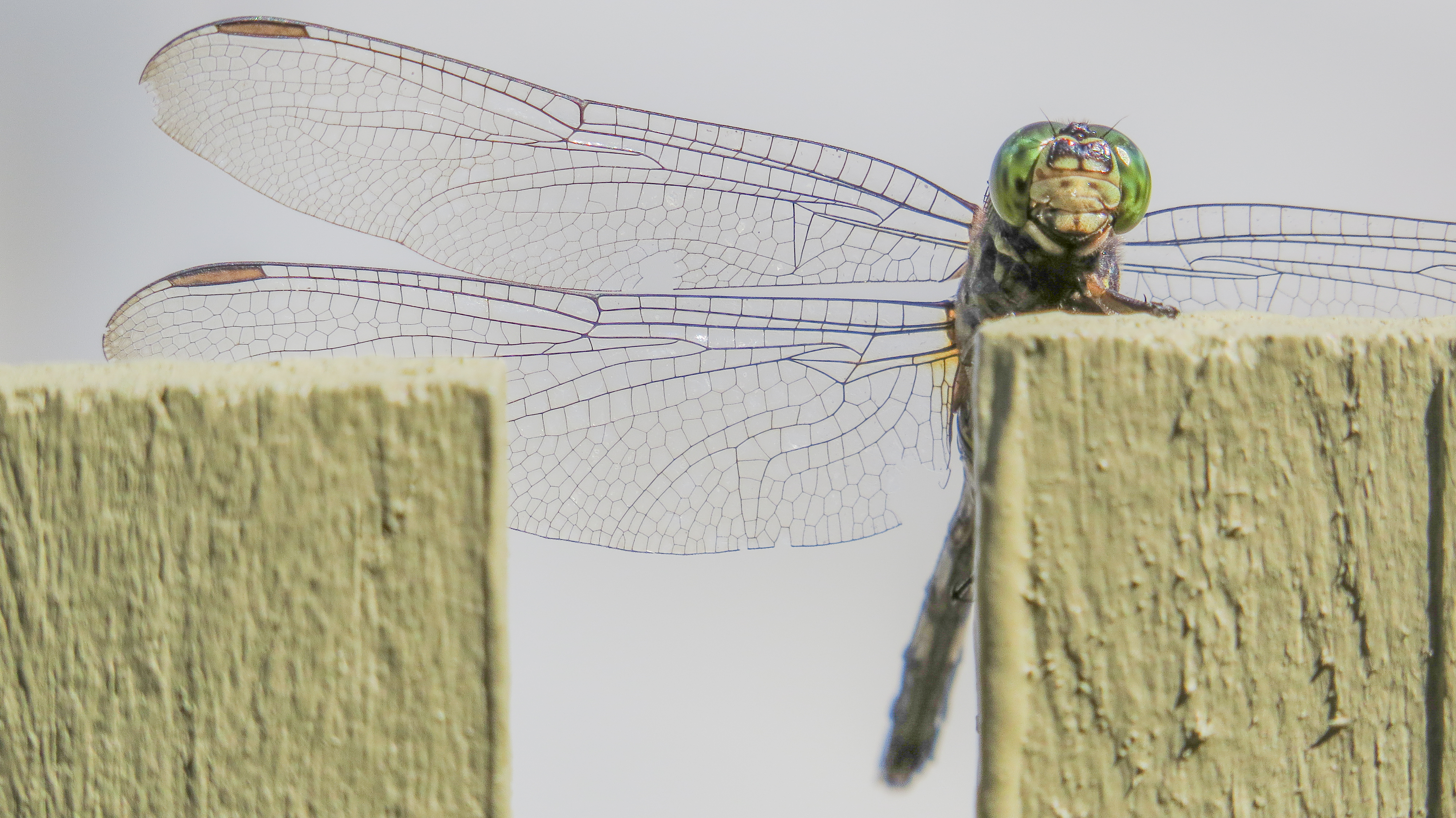
Female face

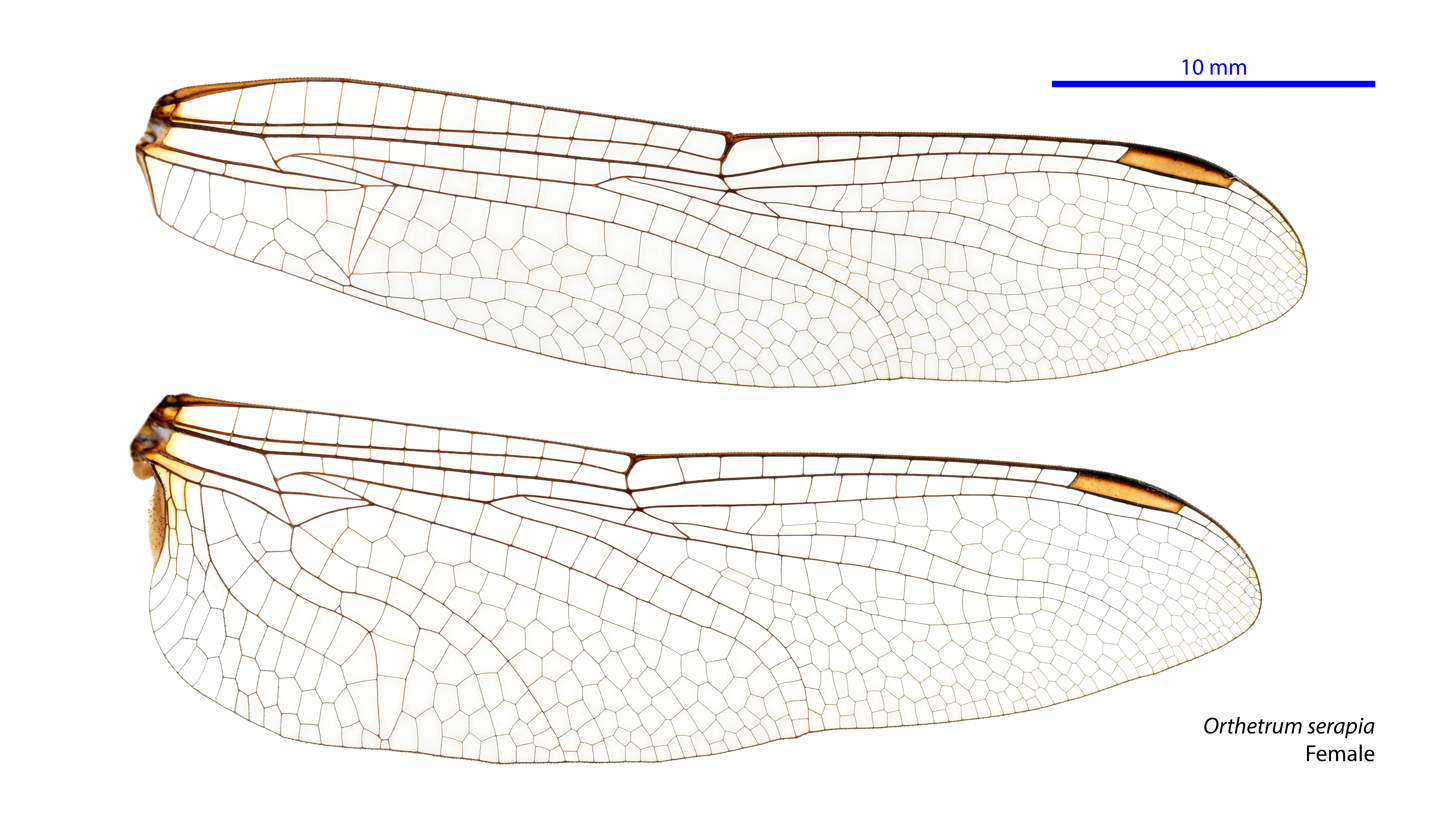
Female wings

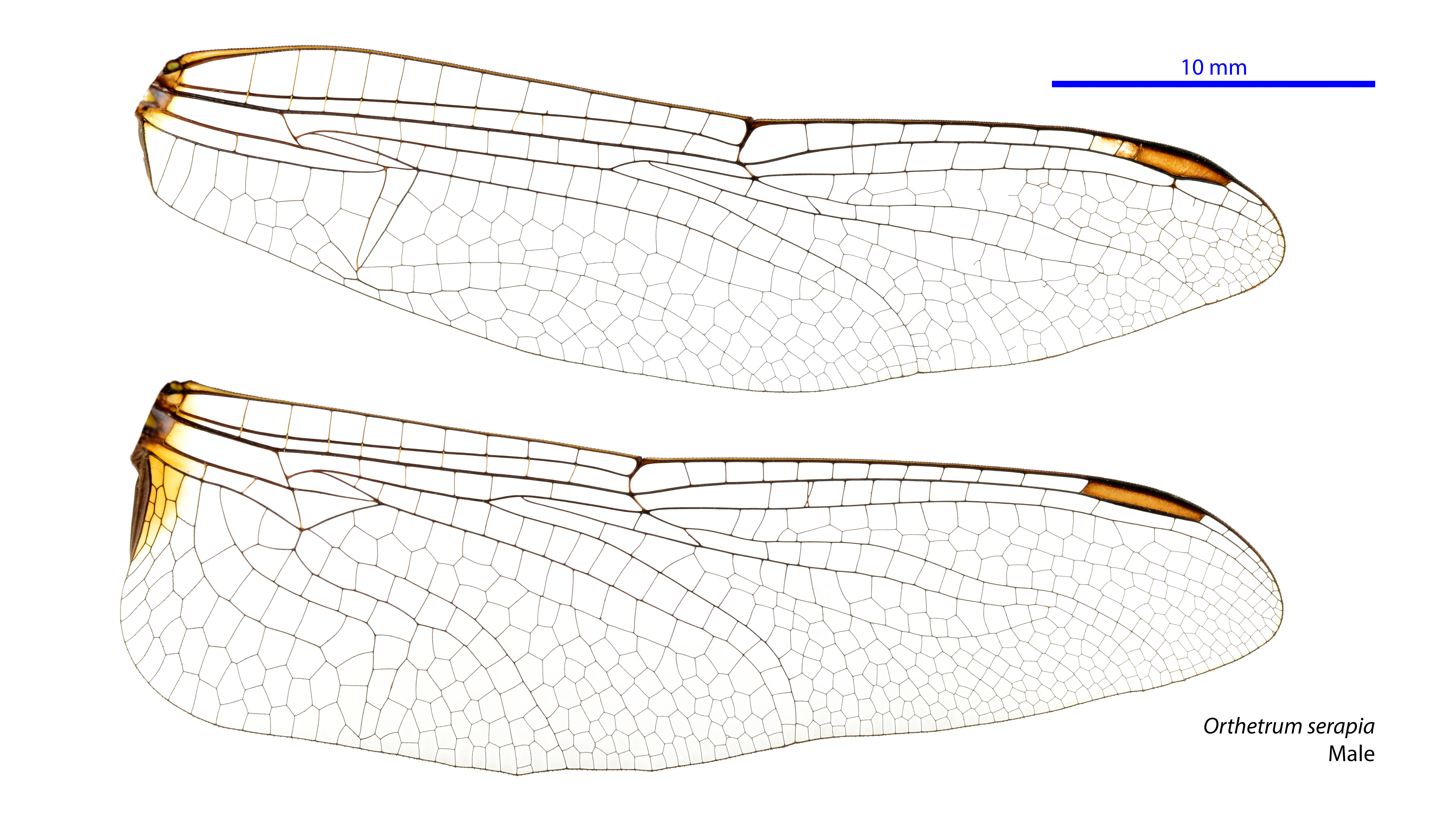
Male wings

== See also ==
- List of Odonata species of Australia
