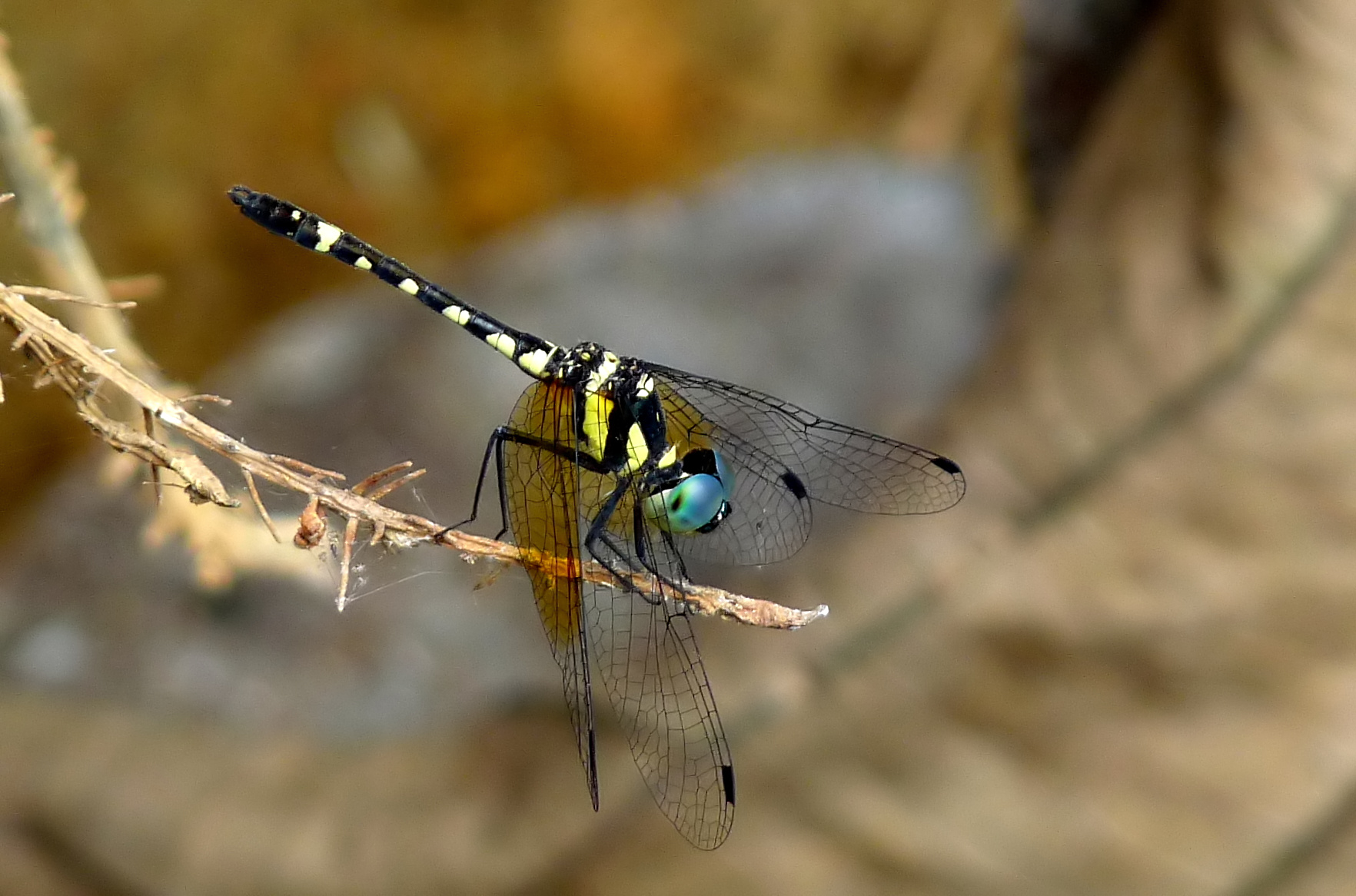
- Tetrathemis platyptera male

Scientific classification
- Kingdom: Animalia
- Phylum: Arthropoda
- Clade: Pancrustacea
- Class: Insecta
- Order: Odonata
- Infraorder: Anisoptera
- Family: Libellulidae
- Subfamily: Tetrathemistinae
- Genus: Tetrathemis; Brauer, 1868

= Tetrathemis =

Genus of dragonflies

Tetrathemis is a genus of dragonflies in the family Libellulidae. Species of Tetrathemis are found in Africa, Madagascar, Asia, New Guinea and Australia.

== Species ==
The genus Tetrathemis includes the following species:

- Tetrathemis camerunensis (Sjöstedt, 1900)
- Tetrathemis corduliformis Longfield, 1936
- Tetrathemis denticauda Fraser, 1954
- Tetrathemis flavescens Kirby, 1889
- Tetrathemis fraseri Legrand, 1977 - treefall elf
- Tetrathemis godiardi Lacroix, 1921
- Tetrathemis irregularis Brauer, 1868 - rainforest elf

- Tetrathemis irregularis cladophila - Tillyard, 1908 - rainforest elf

- Tetrathemis leptoptera Selys, 1877
- Tetrathemis longfieldae Legrand, 1977
- Tetrathemis platyptera Selys, 1878
- Tetrathemis polleni (Selys, 1877) - black-splashed elf
- Tetrathemis ruwensoriensis Fraser, 1941
- Tetrathemis victoriae (Pinhey, 1963)
- Tetrathemis yerburii Kirby, 1893

== Etymology ==
The genus name Tetrathemis is derived from the Greek τετρα- (tetra, "four") and -themis, from Greek Θέμις (Themis), the goddess of divine law, order and justice. In early odonate taxonomy, names ending in -themis were widely used for dragonflies. The name refers to the apparently four-sided triangle in the wings.
