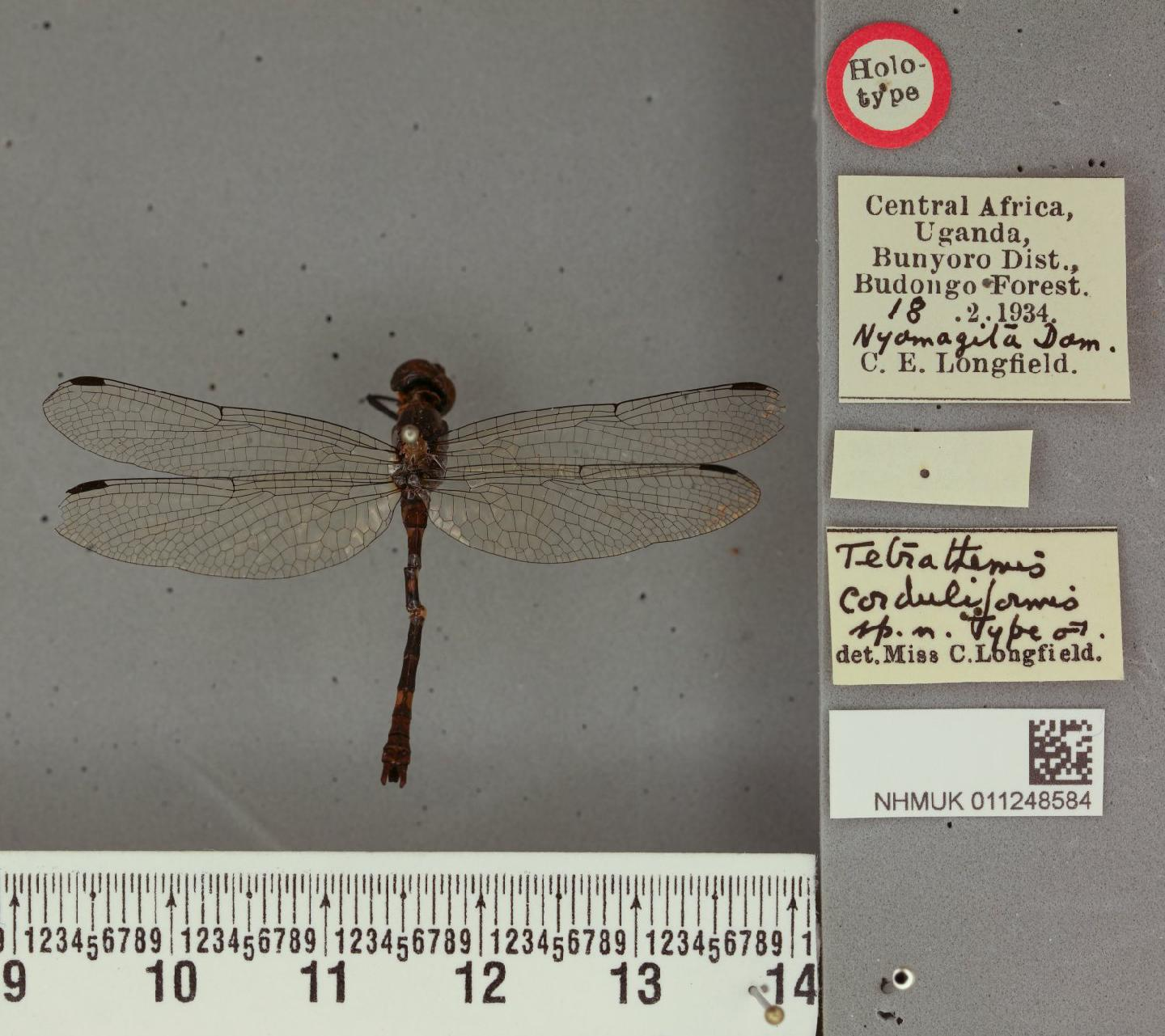

Conservation status
- Least Concern (IUCN 3.1)

Scientific classification
- Kingdom: Animalia
- Phylum: Arthropoda
- Class: Insecta
- Order: Odonata
- Infraorder: Anisoptera
- Family: Libellulidae
- Genus: Tetrathemis
- Species: T. corduliformis

Binomial name
- Tetrathemis corduliformis Longfield, 1936

= Tetrathemis corduliformis =

Species of dragonfly

Tetrathemis corduliformis is a species of dragonfly in the family Libellulidae. It is found in the Democratic Republic of the Congo, Kenya, and Uganda. Its natural habitat is subtropical or tropical moist lowland forests.
