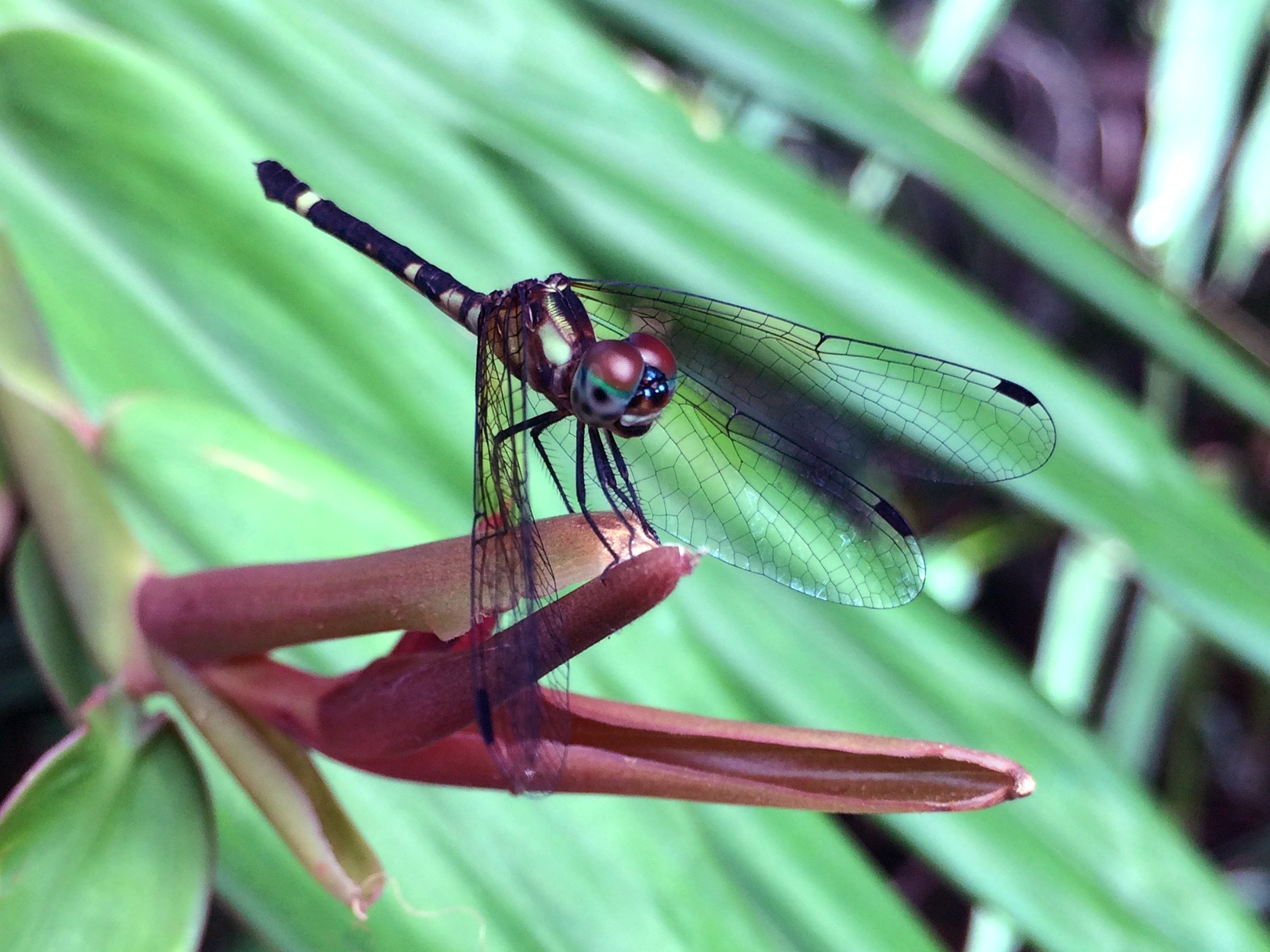
- Tetrathemis irregularis cladophila, Cairns, Australia

Scientific classification
- Kingdom: Animalia
- Phylum: Arthropoda
- Clade: Pancrustacea
- Class: Insecta
- Order: Odonata
- Infraorder: Anisoptera
- Family: Libellulidae
- Genus: Tetrathemis
- Species: T. irregularis
- Subspecies: T. i. cladophila

Trinomial name
- Tetrathemis irregularis cladophila (Tillyard, 1908)

Synonyms
- Tetrathemis cladophila Tillyard, 1908

= Tetrathemis irregularis cladophila =

Subspecies of dragonfly

Tetrathemis irregularis cladophila, known as the rainforest elf, is a subspecies of Tetrathemis irregularis, a dragonfly in the family Libellulidae found only in Australia.

== Description ==
It is a tiny to small, black and yellow dragonfly with a length of 25-30mm and wingspan of 40-50mm. The mostly clear wings are suffused with pale lemon. The abdomen is black with 3 to 4 yellow markings, and there is a metallic sheen on the synthorax.

== Distribution ==
The genus Tetrathemis extends from Africa and Madagascar to south-east Asia, New Guinea and Australia. Tetrathemis irregularis cladophila has only been recorded coastal and adjacent inland from Cape York Peninsula to Cardwell in Queensland. The taxon has not yet been assessed for the IUCN Red List, but it appears in the Catalogue of Life.

== Habitat ==
Tetrathemis irregularis cladophila inhabits streams in rainforest.

== Etymology ==
The genus name Tetrathemis is derived from the Greek τετρα- (tetra, "four") and -themis, from Greek Θέμις (Themis), the goddess of divine law, order and justice. In early odonate taxonomy, names ending in -themis were widely used for dragonflies. The name refers to the apparently four-sided triangle in the wings.

The species name irregularis is derived from the Latin in- ("not") and regularis ("regular" or "orderly"). The name also refers to the irregular four-sided triangle in the wings.

The subspecies name cladophila is derived from the Greek κλάδος (klados, "branch" or "twig") and φίλος (philos, "loving" or "fond of"), referring to its behaviour of repeatedly returning to the same twig.

== Gallery ==
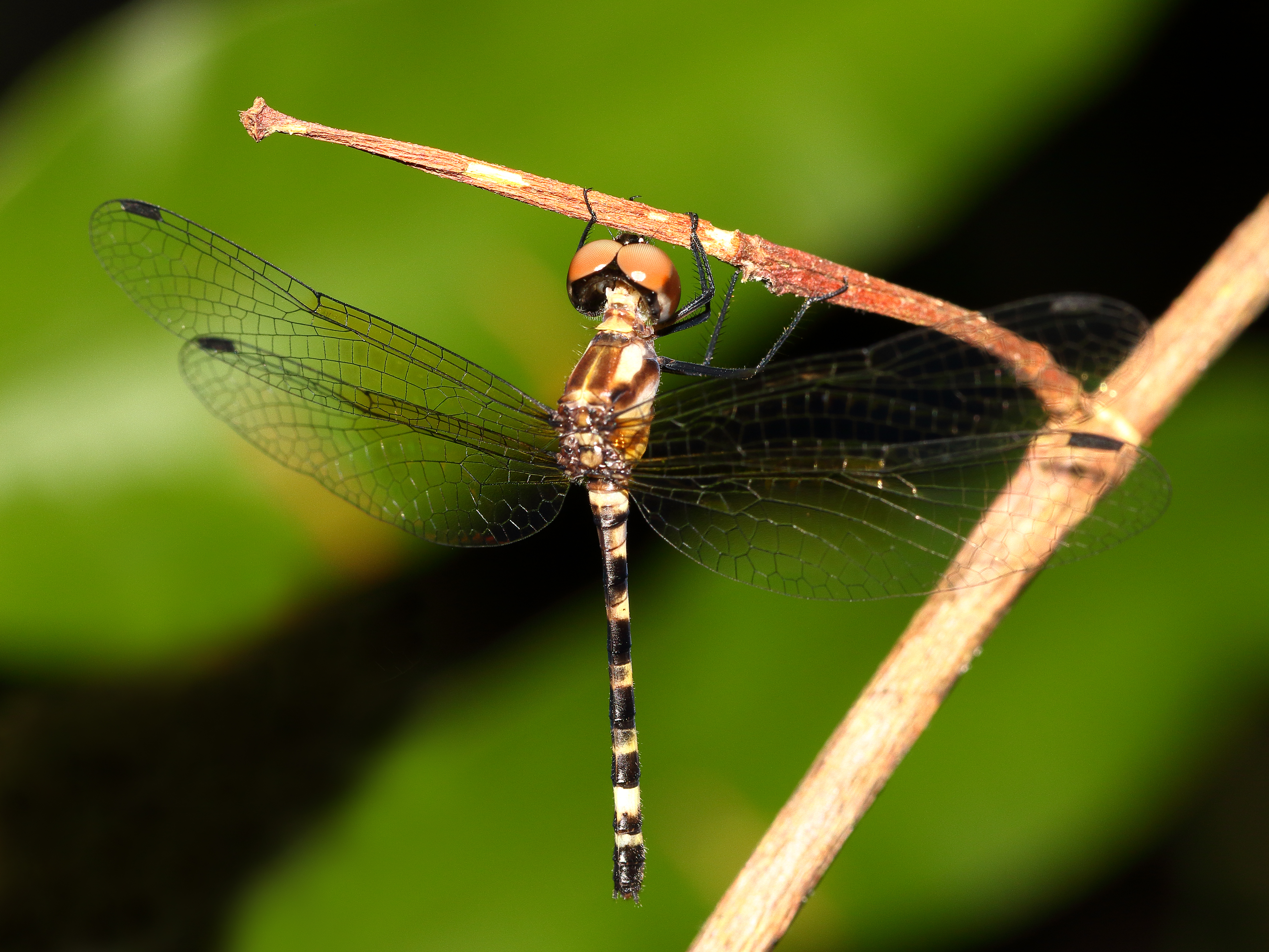
Female in Cairns

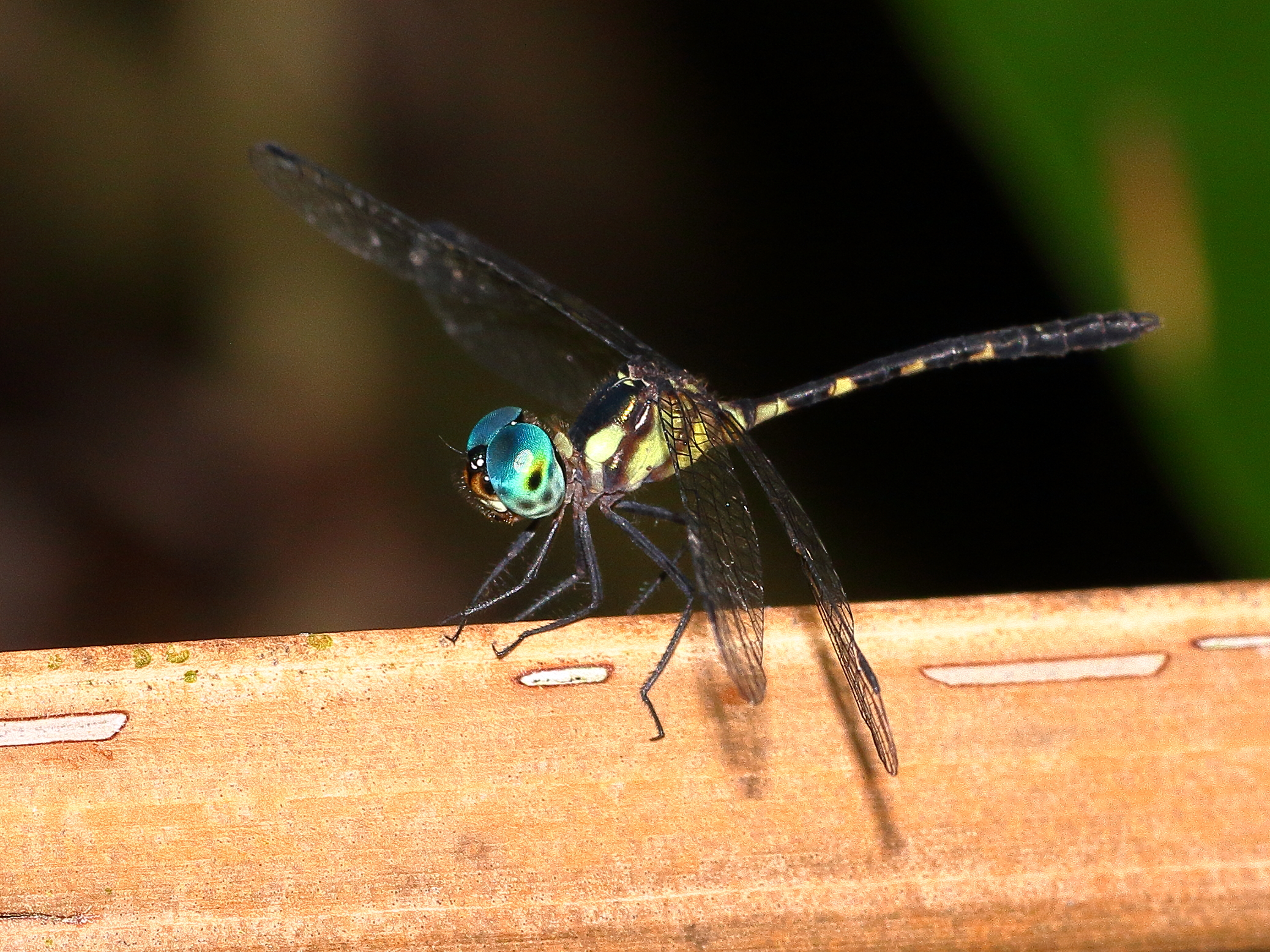
Male in Cairns

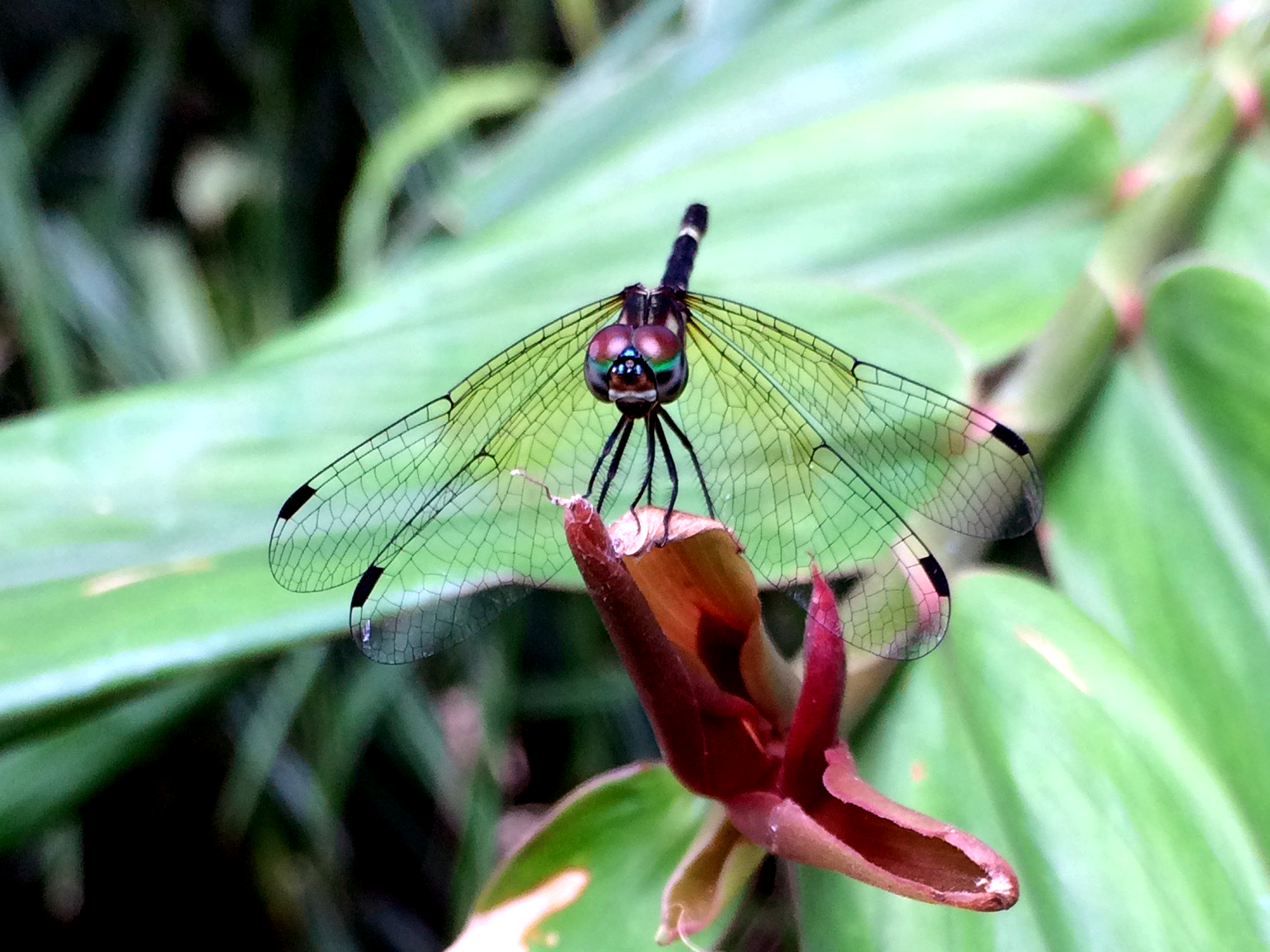
Female Rainforest elf in Cairns, head on view

Illustration of Tetrathemis wings

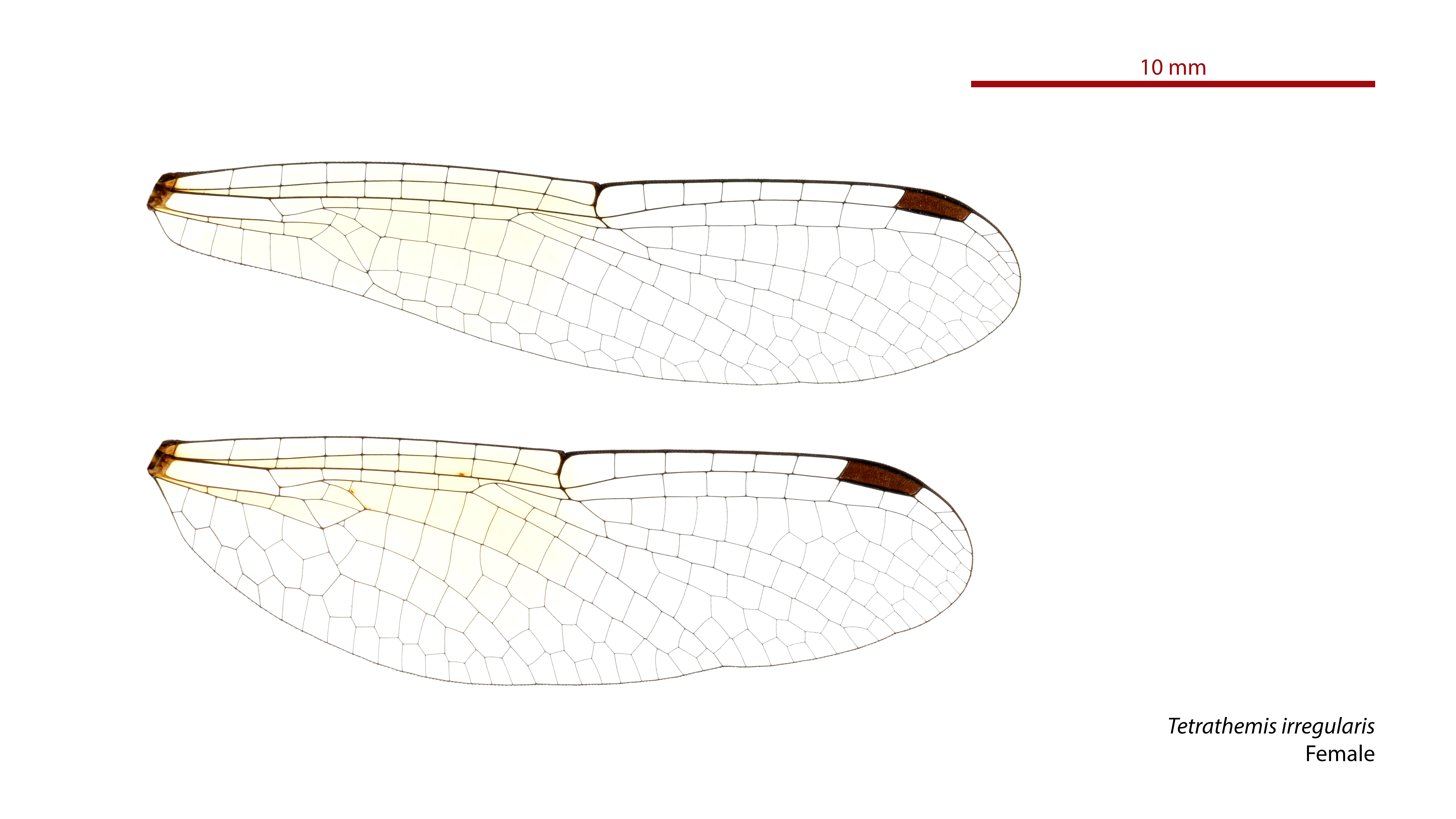
Photo of female wings
