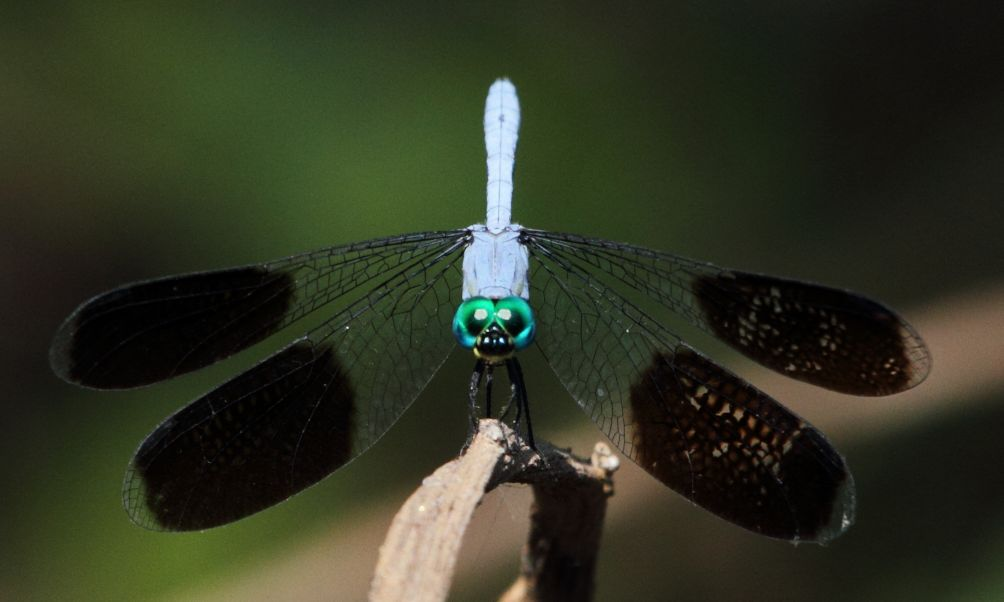
- Male

Conservation status
- Least Concern (IUCN 3.1)

Scientific classification
- Kingdom: Animalia
- Phylum: Arthropoda
- Class: Insecta
- Order: Odonata
- Infraorder: Anisoptera
- Family: Libellulidae
- Genus: Tetrathemis
- Species: T. polleni

Binomial name
- Tetrathemis polleni (Selys, 1869)

= Tetrathemis polleni =

Species of dragonfly

Tetrathemis polleni, the black-splashed elf, is a species of dragonfly in the family Libellulidae.

== Distribution and status ==
It is found in sub-Saharan Africa from South Africa to Somalia, Ethiopia and Gambia.

== Habitat ==
This dragonfly is found at shaded pools, such as those found in gallery forest.
