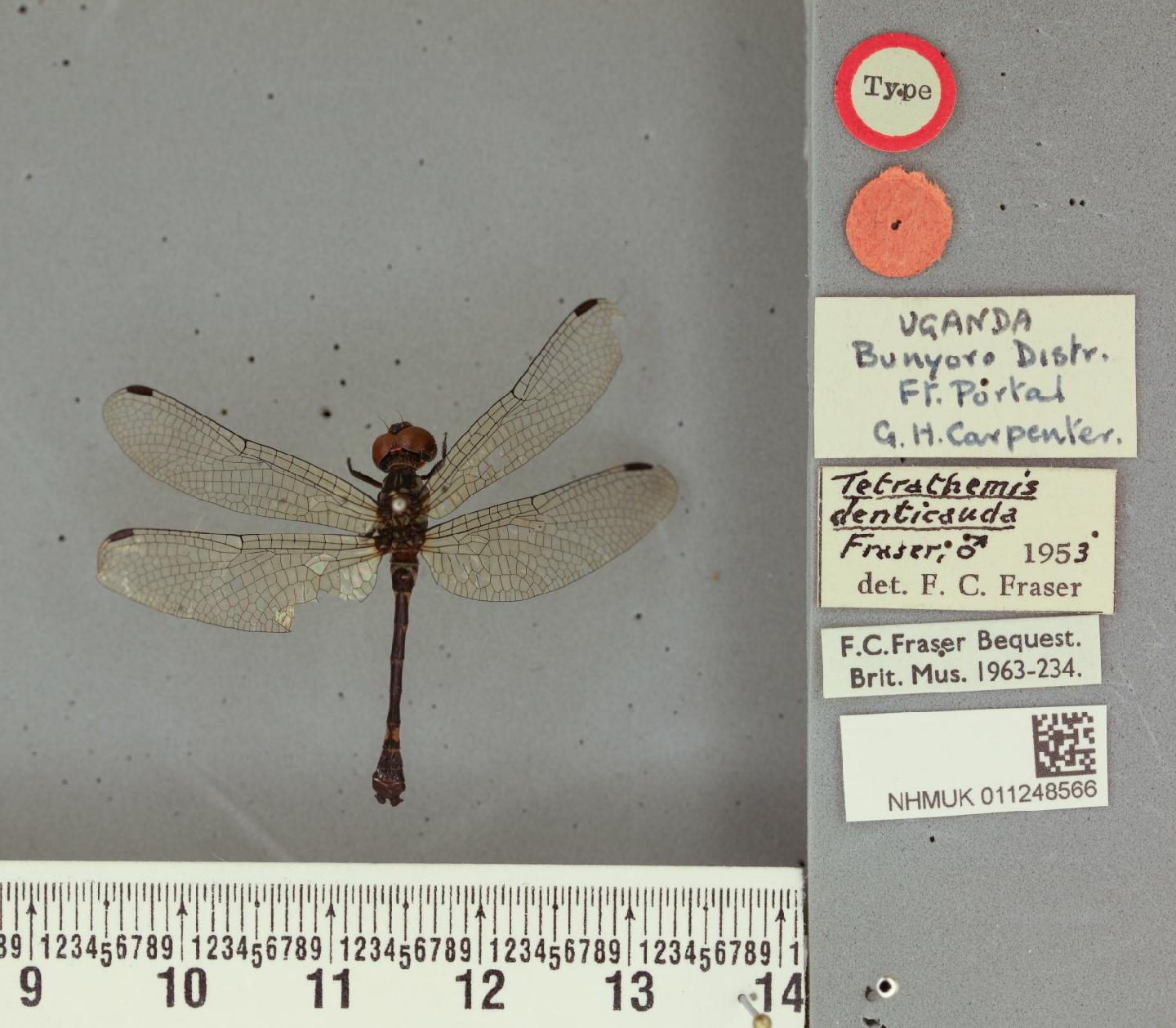

Conservation status
- Data Deficient (IUCN 3.1)

Scientific classification
- Kingdom: Animalia
- Phylum: Arthropoda
- Class: Insecta
- Order: Odonata
- Infraorder: Anisoptera
- Family: Libellulidae
- Genus: Tetrathemis
- Species: T. denticauda

Binomial name
- Tetrathemis denticauda Fraser, 1954

= Tetrathemis denticauda =

Species of dragonfly

Tetrathemis denticauda is a species of dragonfly in the family Libellulidae. It is found in the Democratic Republic of the Congo and Uganda. Its natural habitat is subtropical or tropical moist lowland forests. It is threatened by habitat loss.
