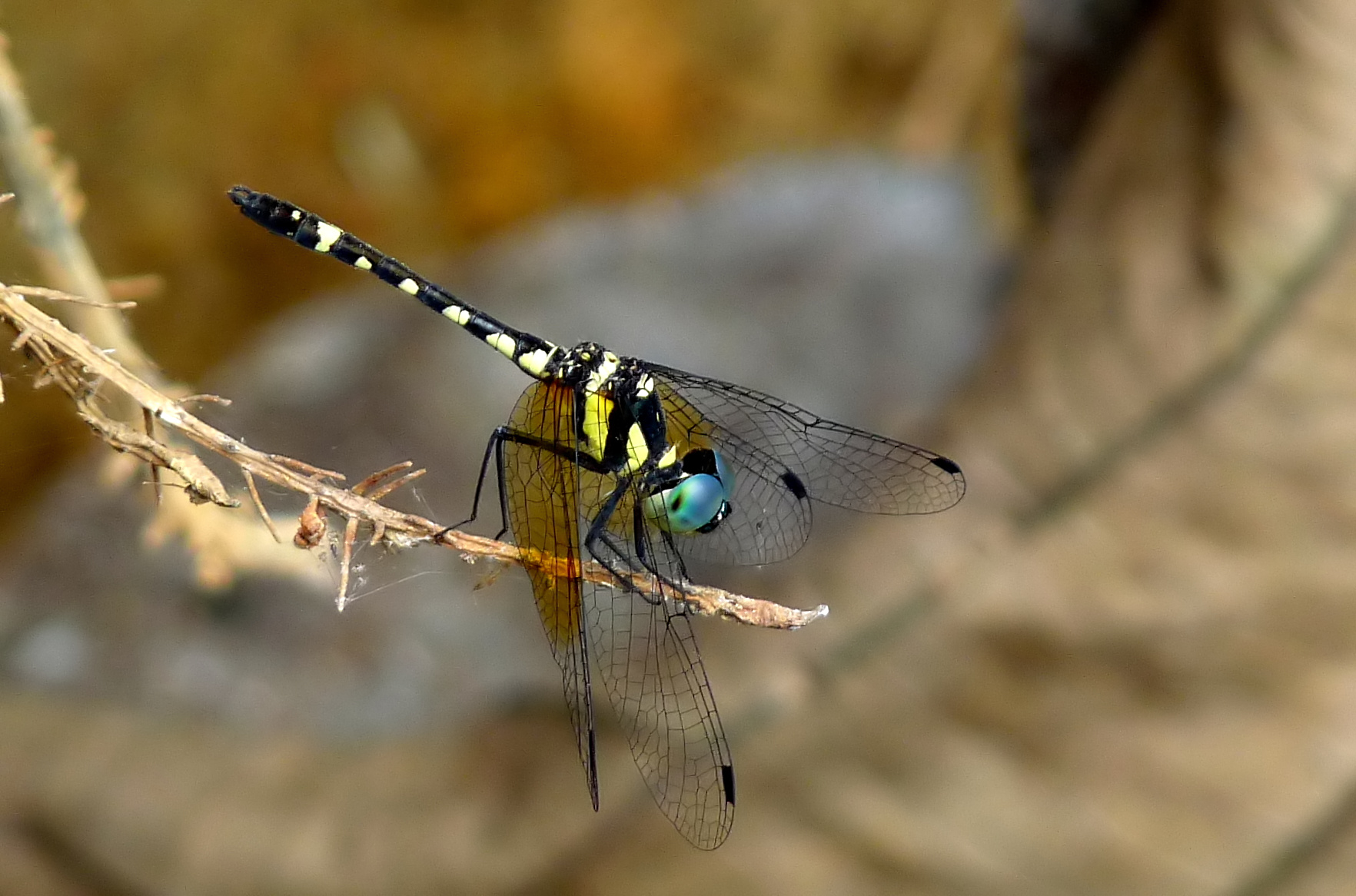
- Male

Conservation status
- Least Concern (IUCN 3.1)

Scientific classification
- Kingdom: Animalia
- Phylum: Arthropoda
- Class: Insecta
- Order: Odonata
- Infraorder: Anisoptera
- Family: Libellulidae
- Genus: Tetrathemis
- Species: T. platyptera

Binomial name
- Tetrathemis platyptera Sélys, 1878

Synonyms
- Tetrathemis flava Krüger, 1902; Tetrathemis pulchra Laidlaw, 1902

= Tetrathemis platyptera =

Species of dragonfly

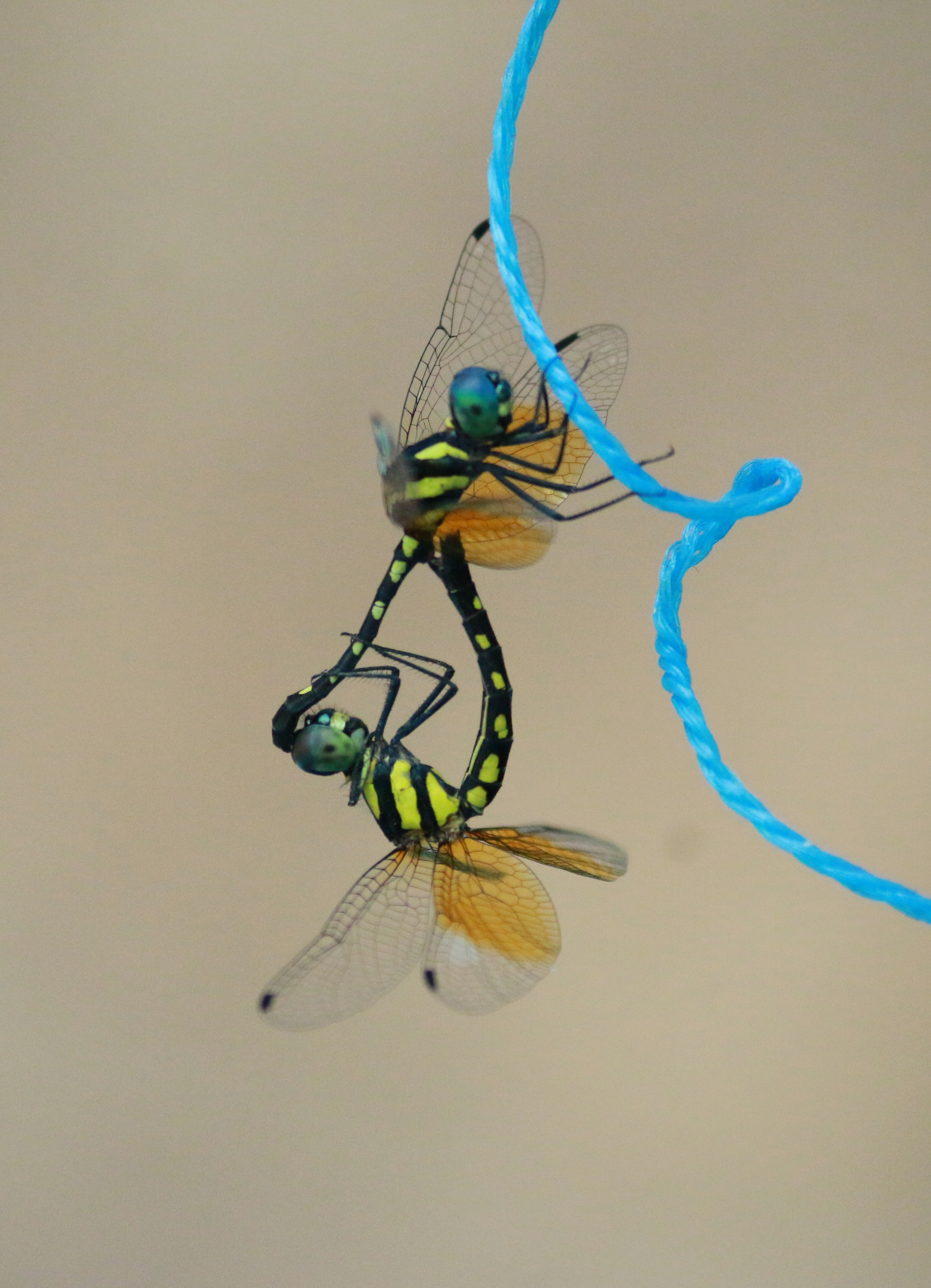

Tetrathemis platyptera, the pigmy skimmer, is a species of dragonfly in the family Libellulidae. It is widespread in many Asian countries and locally common over much of its range.

== Description and habitat ==
It is a small dragonfly with yellow face and bluish green eyes. Its thorax and abdomen are yellow with broad black marks. Its wings are transparent, with fore-wings faintly and hind-wings broadly tinted with yellow at the bases. Females are similar to males.

It breeds in vegetated ponds and wells. The female stabs her eggs onto dry twigs hanging over water. The eggs hatch out in rains and the naiads fall directly into the water below.

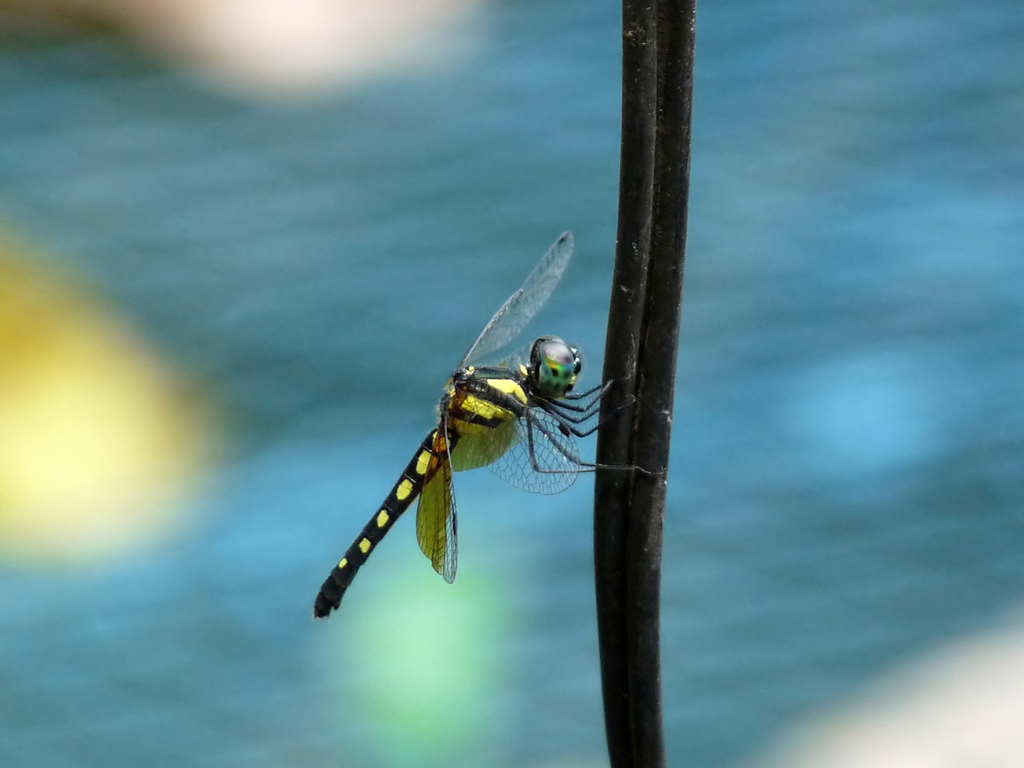
Female

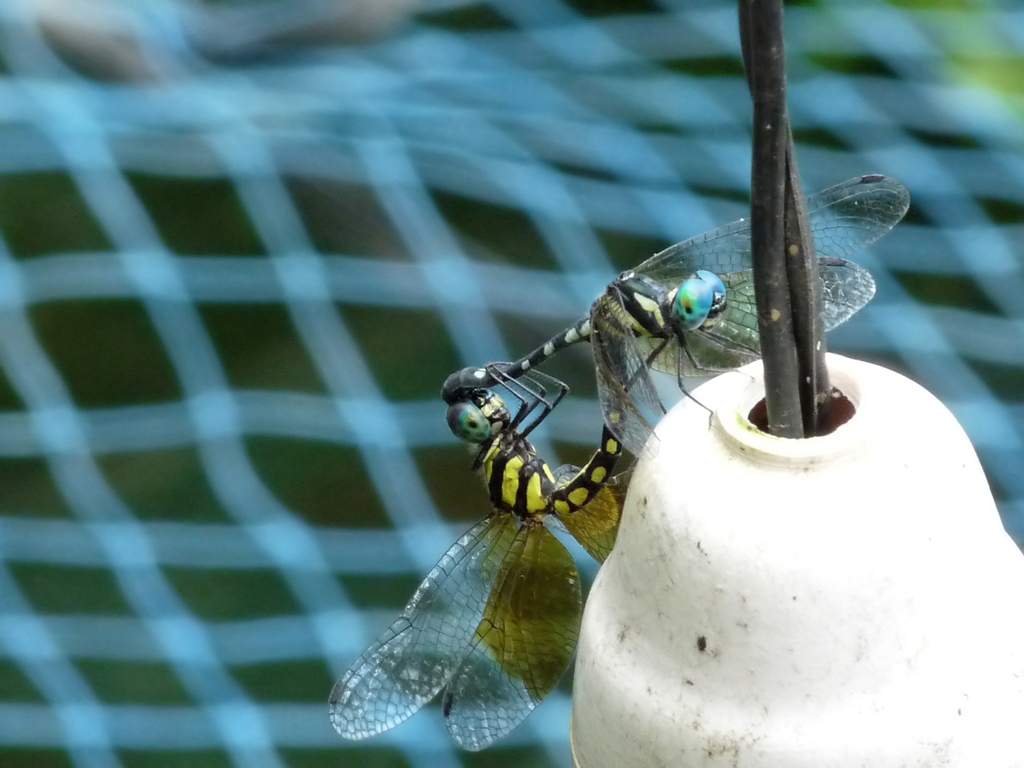
Mating

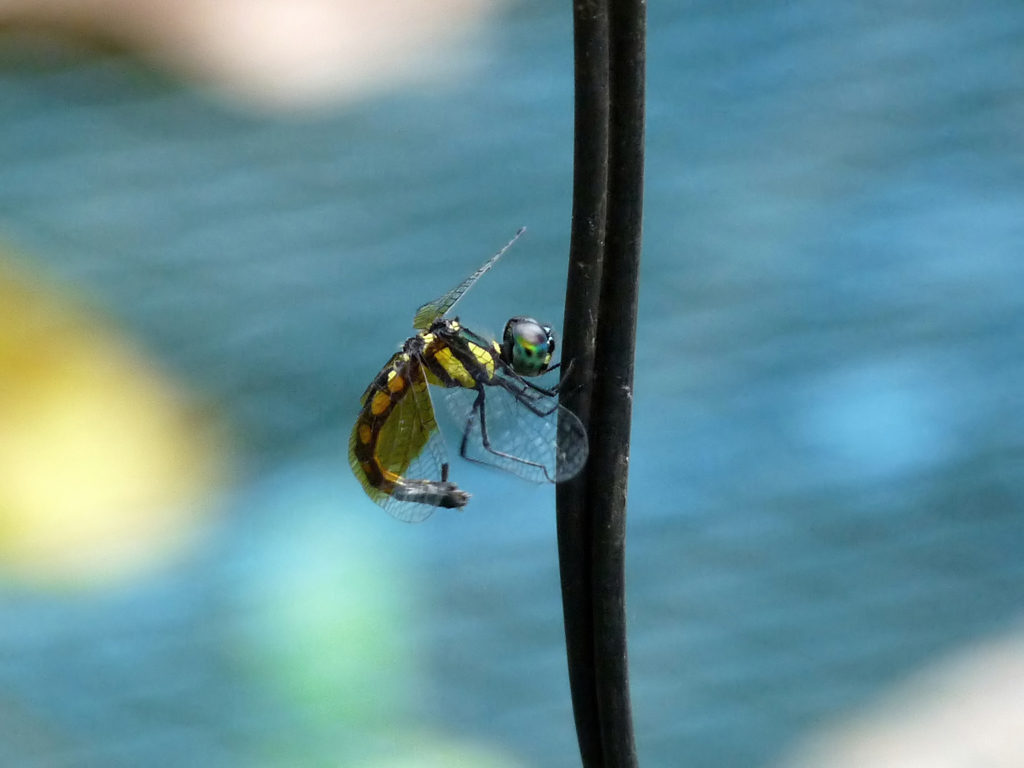
Laying eggs on a hanging wire over the pool

== See also ==
- List of odonates of Sri Lanka
- List of odonates of India
- List of odonata of Kerala
