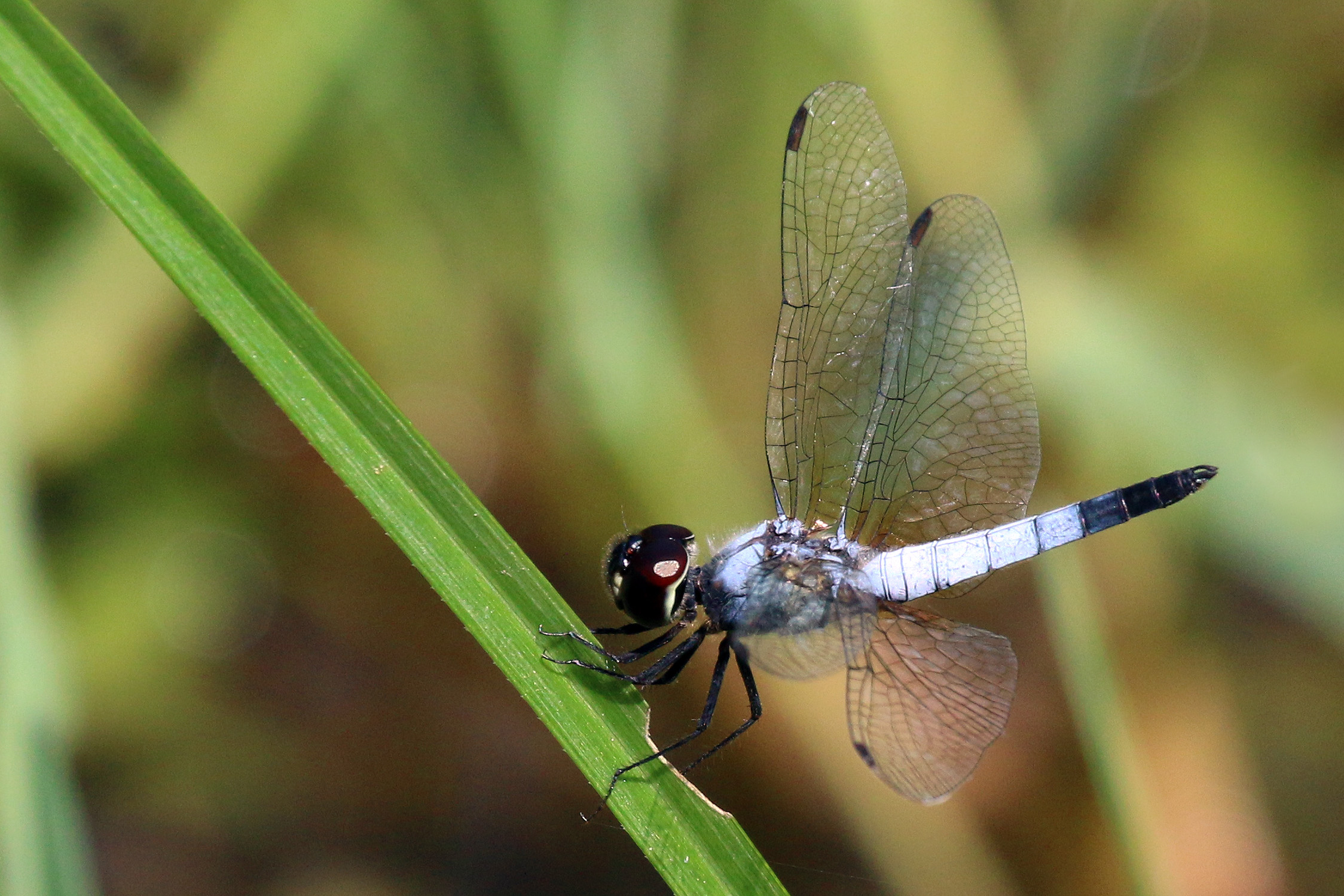
- Pond adjutant, male Aethriamanta gracilis Pulau Ubin, Singapore

Scientific classification
- Kingdom: Animalia
- Phylum: Arthropoda
- Clade: Pancrustacea
- Class: Insecta
- Order: Odonata
- Suborder: Anisoptera
- Superfamily: Libelluloidea
- Family: Libellulidae
- Genus: Aethriamanta; Kirby, 1889

Type species
- Aethriamanta brevipennis

= Aethriamanta =

Genus of dragonflies

Aethriamanta is a genus of dragonflies in the family Libellulidae. Species of Aethriamanta are found in Madagascar, through Southeast Asia, Indonesia, New Guinea and northern Australia.

== Etymology ==
The genus name Aethriamanta combines the Greek αἴθρα (aithra, "bright sky") with the Latin amans ("loving"), possibly meaning "loving the bright sky".

== Species ==
This genus Aethriamanta includes the following species:

Male	Female	Scientific name	Common name	Distribution
		Aethriamanta aethra Ris, 1912		Cambodia, Indonesia, Malaysia, Singapore, Thailand, and Vietnam.
		Aethriamanta brevipennis (Rambur, 1842)	scarlet marsh hawk	Asia
		Aethriamanta circumsignata Selys, 1897	square-spot basker	Australia, and New Guinea
		Aethriamanta gracilis (Brauer, 1878)		Sumatra and Borneo Philippines, Singapore, Peninsular Malaysia, Thailand and Lao
		Aethriamanta nymphaeae Lieftinck, 1949	L-spot basker	northern Australia
		Aethriamanta rezia Kirby, 1889	pygmy basker	Angola, Botswana, the Democratic Republic of the Congo, Ivory Coast, Gambia, Ghana, Guinea, Kenya, Liberia, Madagascar, Malawi, Mozambique, Namibia, Nigeria, Senegal, South Africa, Tanzania, Togo, Uganda, Zimbabwe
