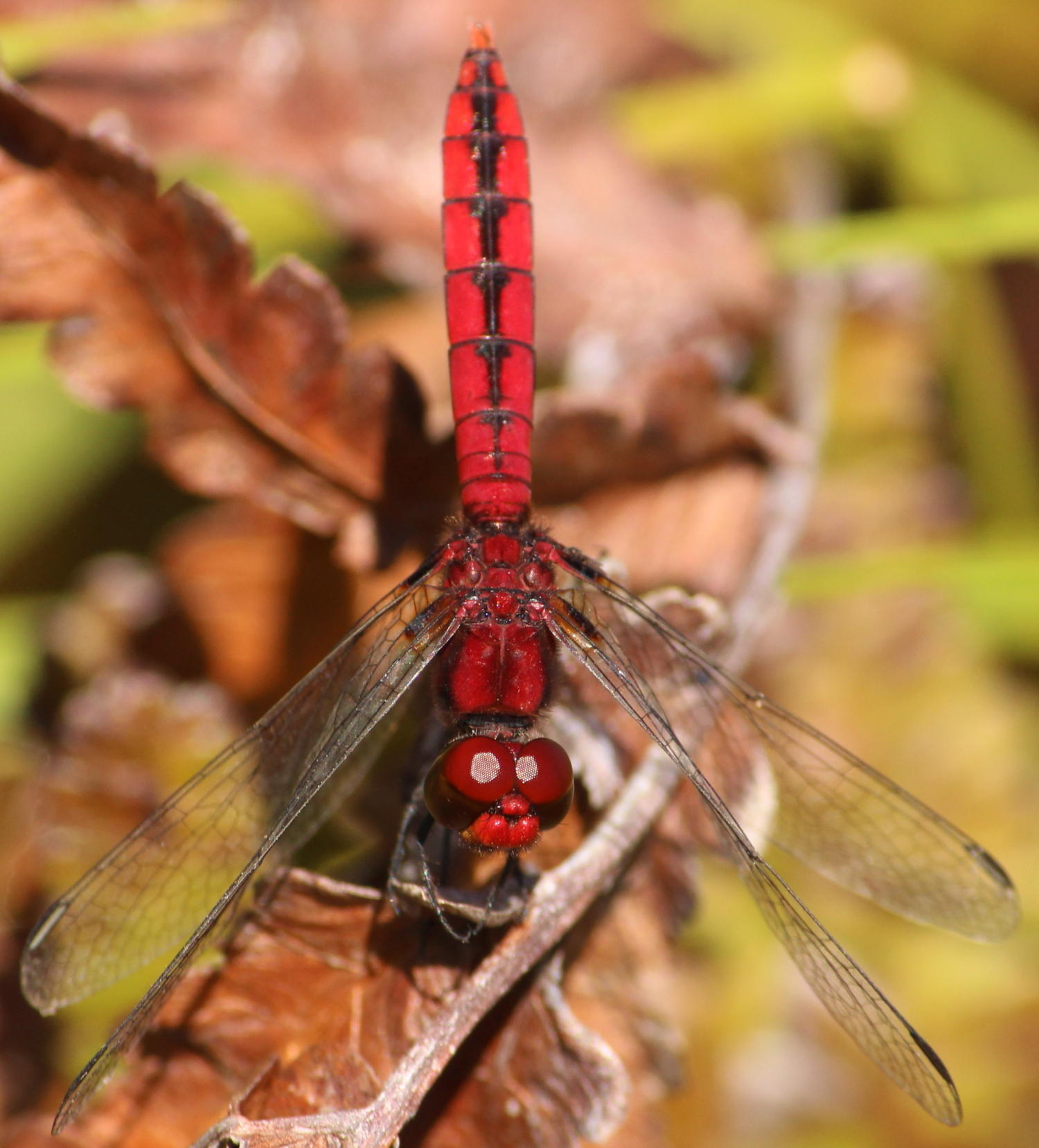

Conservation status
- Least Concern (IUCN 3.1)

Scientific classification
- Kingdom: Animalia
- Phylum: Arthropoda
- Class: Insecta
- Order: Odonata
- Infraorder: Anisoptera
- Family: Libellulidae
- Genus: Aethriamanta
- Species: A. rezia

Binomial name
- Aethriamanta rezia Kirby, 1889

= Aethriamanta rezia =

Species of dragonfly

Aethriamanta rezia is a species of dragonfly in the family Libellulidae. Described by William Forsell Kirby in 1889, it is found in Angola, Botswana, the Democratic Republic of the Congo, Ivory Coast, Gambia, Ghana, Guinea, Kenya, Liberia, Madagascar, Malawi, Mozambique, Namibia, Nigeria, Senegal, South Africa, Tanzania, Togo, Uganda, Zimbabwe, and possibly Burundi. Its natural habitats are subtropical or tropical moist lowland forests, moist and dry savanna, subtropical or tropical moist and dry shrubland, rivers, marshes, and other wetlands.
