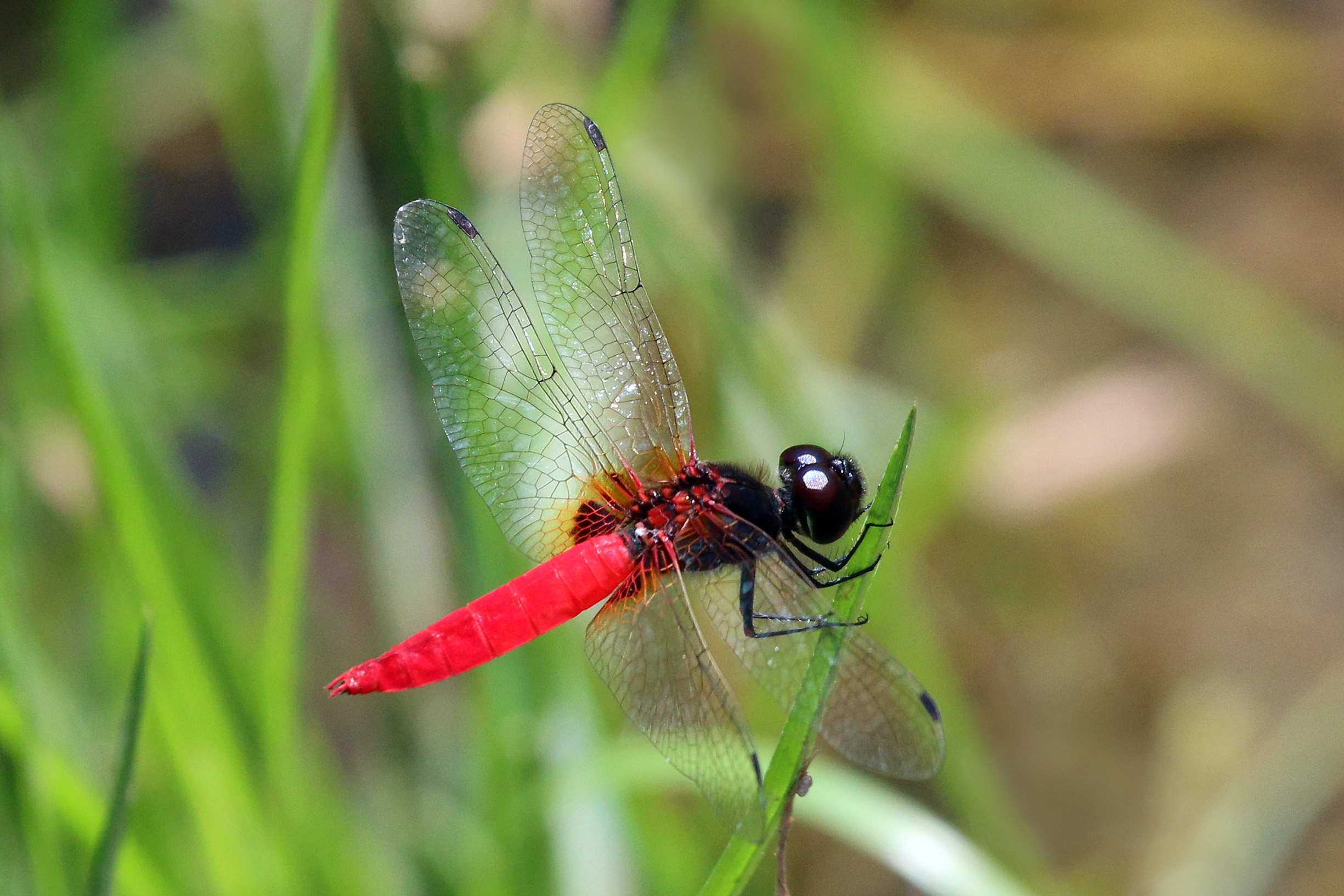
- Male, Sabah, Borneo
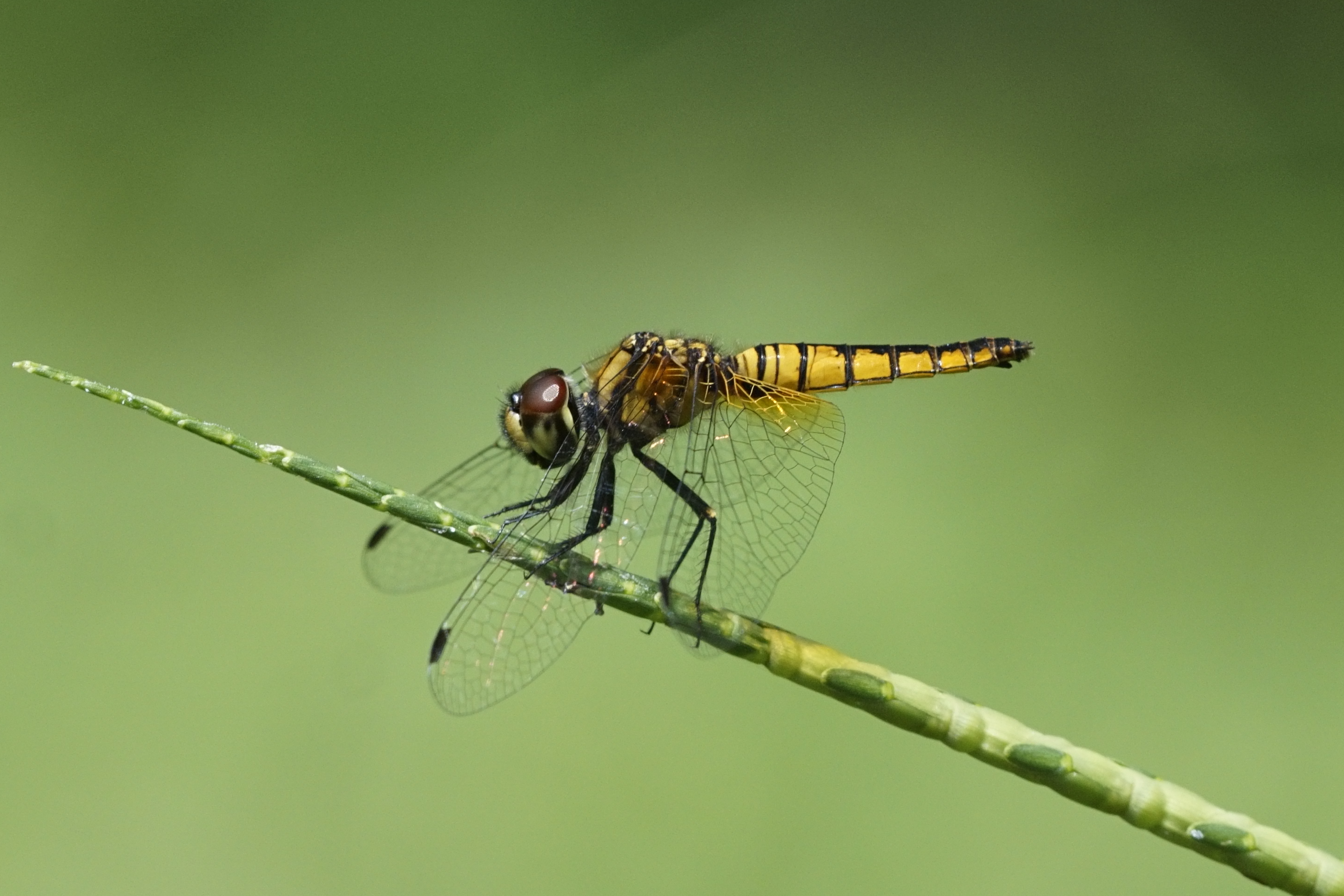
- female

Conservation status
- Least Concern (IUCN 3.1)

Scientific classification
- Kingdom: Animalia
- Phylum: Arthropoda
- Class: Insecta
- Order: Odonata
- Infraorder: Anisoptera
- Family: Libellulidae
- Genus: Aethriamanta
- Species: A. brevipennis

Binomial name
- Aethriamanta brevipennis (Rambur, 1842)

Synonyms
- Libellula brevipennis Rambur, 1842

= Aethriamanta brevipennis =

Scarlet marsh hawk

Species of dragonfly

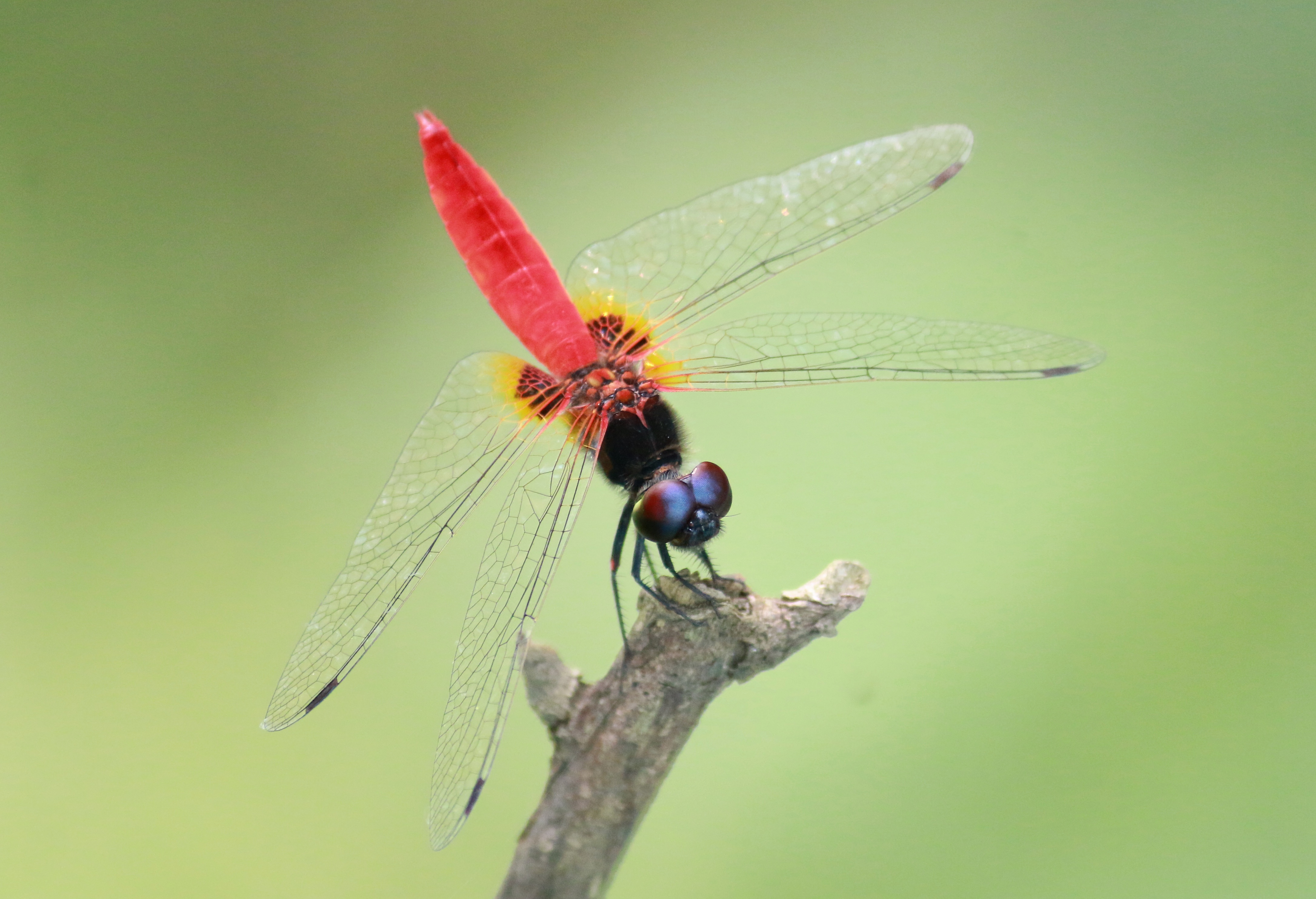
Aethriamanta brevipennis male

Aethriamanta brevipennis, scarlet marsh hawk, is a species of dragonfly in the family Libellulidae. It is widely distributed in South and Southeast Asia and also occurs in the Solomon Islands.

== Subspecies ==
Two subspecies may be recognized:

- Aethriamanta brevipennis brevipennis Rambur, 1842 – scarlet marsh hawk
- Aethriamanta brevipennis subsignata Selys, 1897 – black-headed basker

== Description and habitat ==
It is a small dragonfly with dark reddish-brown eyes. Its thorax is dark chocolate-brown on dorsum and humeral region, paling on sides. Wings are transparent, tinted with deep golden-amber at base. Abdomen and anal appendages are bright red. Female is similar to the male; but greenish-yellow in colors.

It breeds in weedy ponds and lakes.

== See also ==
- List of odonates of Sri Lanka
- List of odonates of India
- List of odonata of Kerala
