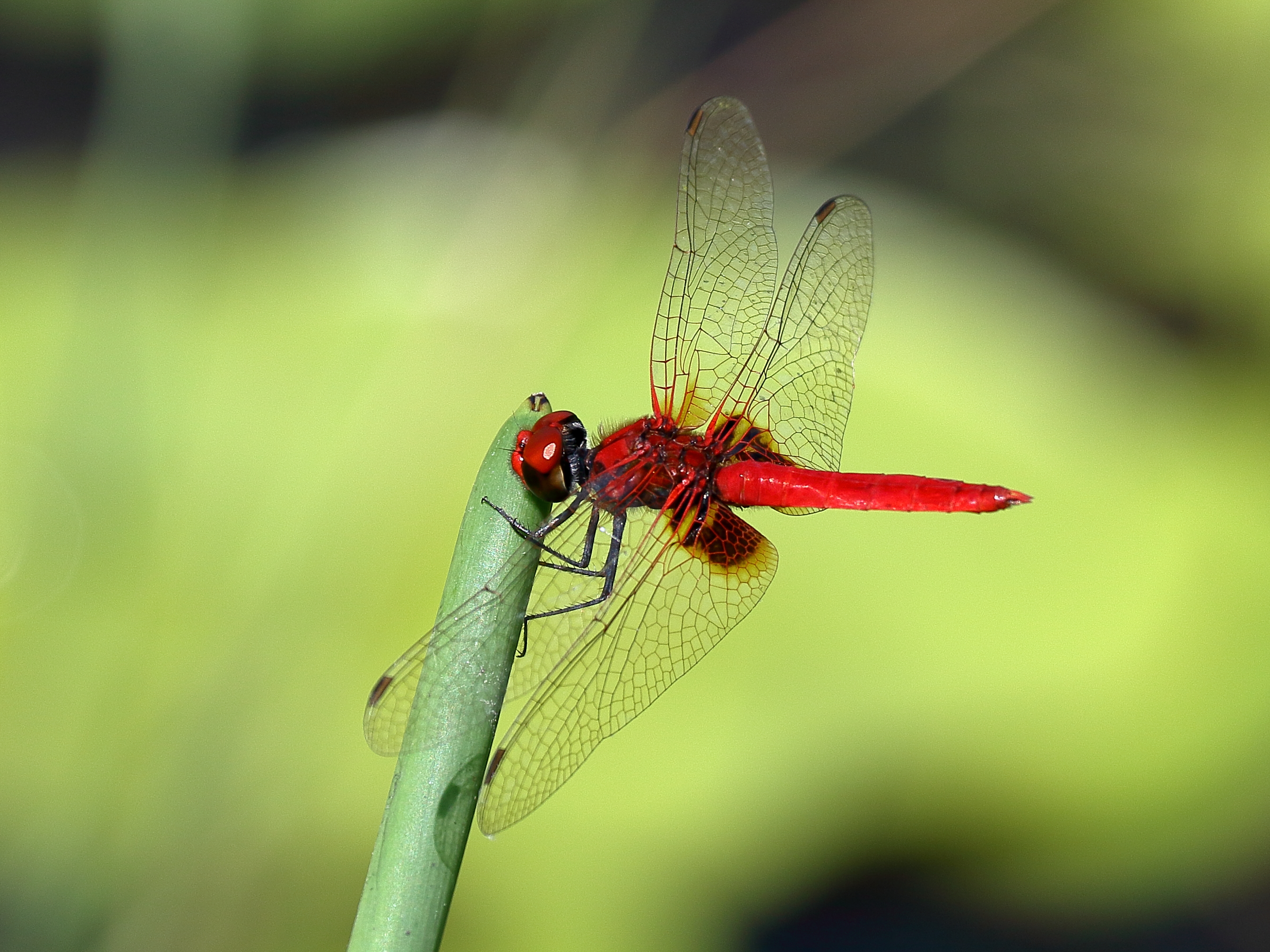
- Male Aethriamanta circumsignata, Northern Territory, Australia
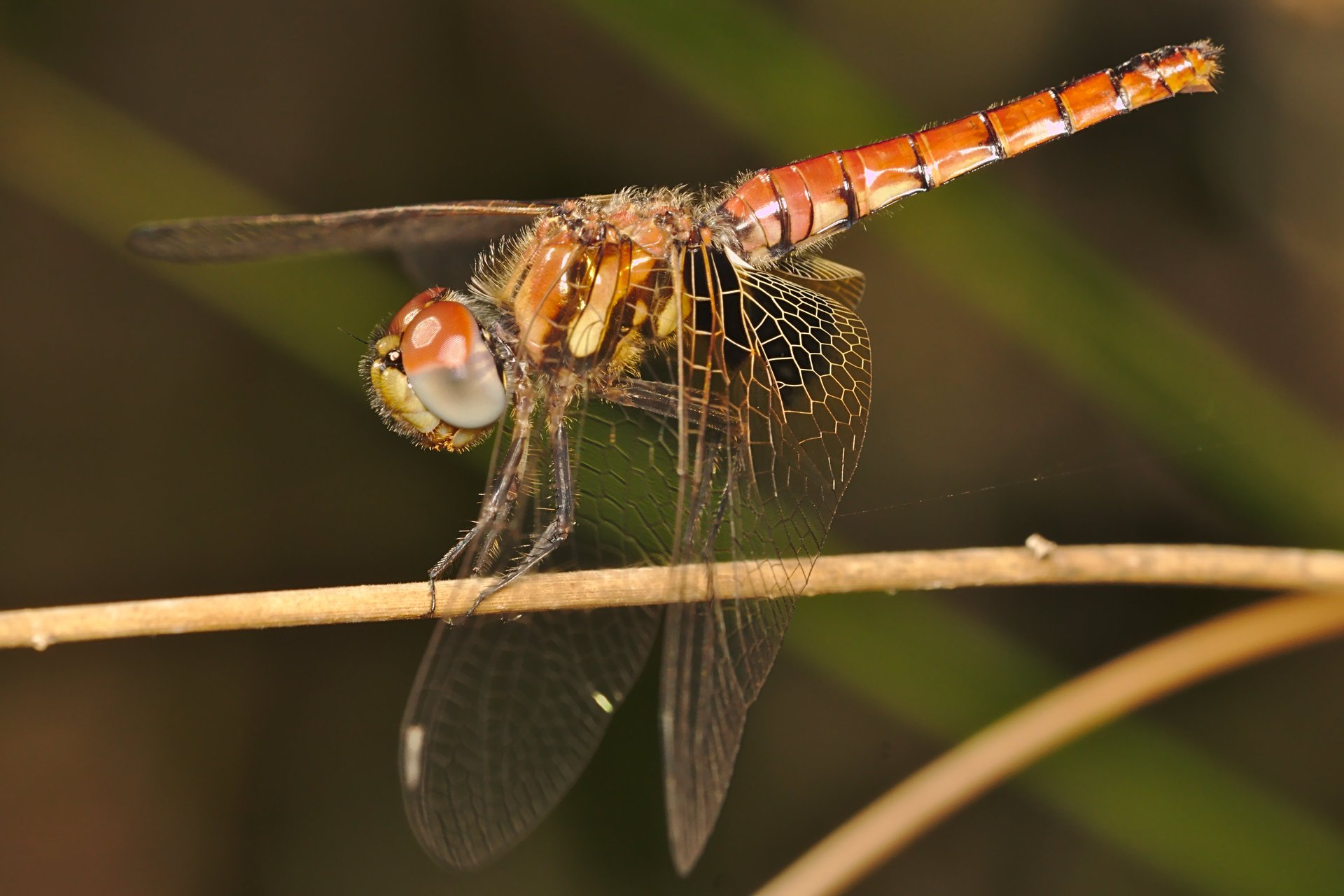
- Female Aethriamanta circumsignata

Conservation status
- Least Concern (IUCN 3.1)

Scientific classification
- Kingdom: Animalia
- Phylum: Arthropoda
- Clade: Pancrustacea
- Class: Insecta
- Order: Odonata
- Infraorder: Anisoptera
- Family: Libellulidae
- Genus: Aethriamanta
- Species: A. circumsignata

Binomial name
- Aethriamanta circumsignata Selys, 1897

Synonyms
- Urothemis circumscripta Martin, 1901

= Aethriamanta circumsignata =

Square-spot basker

Species of dragonfly

Aethriamanta circumsignata known as the square-spot basker is a species of dragonfly in the family Libellulidae. It is found in Australia, and New Guinea. The species is usually found near still or sluggish waters.

In northern Australia, it is found coastal and adjacent inland in an arc from Broome, Western Australia to around Coffs Harbour in New South Wales.

They are a small dragonfly with a wingspan of 40–60 mm, and predominantly red in colour. The wings have less venation than larger dragonflies, and few antenodal cross-veins. Adults may be found at some distance from water. The hindwing has a brown mark at the base which is squarish in shape, leading to its common name. The taxon has been assessed as being of least concern for the IUCN Red List.

== Identification ==
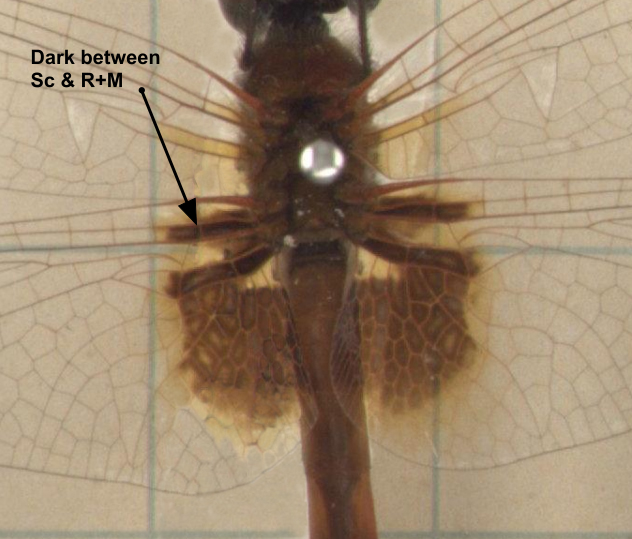
Square-spot basker detail

The square-spot basker Aethriamanta circumsignata and L-spot basker Aethriamanta nymphaeae are very similar dragonflies and can be difficult to separate. The common name describes dark markings at the base of the hindwing of each species. The square-spot basker generally has two dark brown flecks. One radiates between the second and third vein (Sc and R) and the other radiates between the fourth and fifth vein (Cu and A). Below these flecks is a large dark squarish patch containing a small transparent wedge near the abdomen. A lighter brown surrounds the dark marks and may extend to the triangle and hindwing margin. Light brown marks may also exist at the base of the forewing.

== Etymology ==
The genus name Aethriamanta combines the Greek αἴθρα (aithra, "bright sky") with the Latin amans ("loving"), possibly meaning "loving the bright sky".

The species name circumsignata is derived from the Latin circum ("around") and signo ("to mark"), referring to the dark spot on the hindwings bordered with yellow.

== Gallery ==
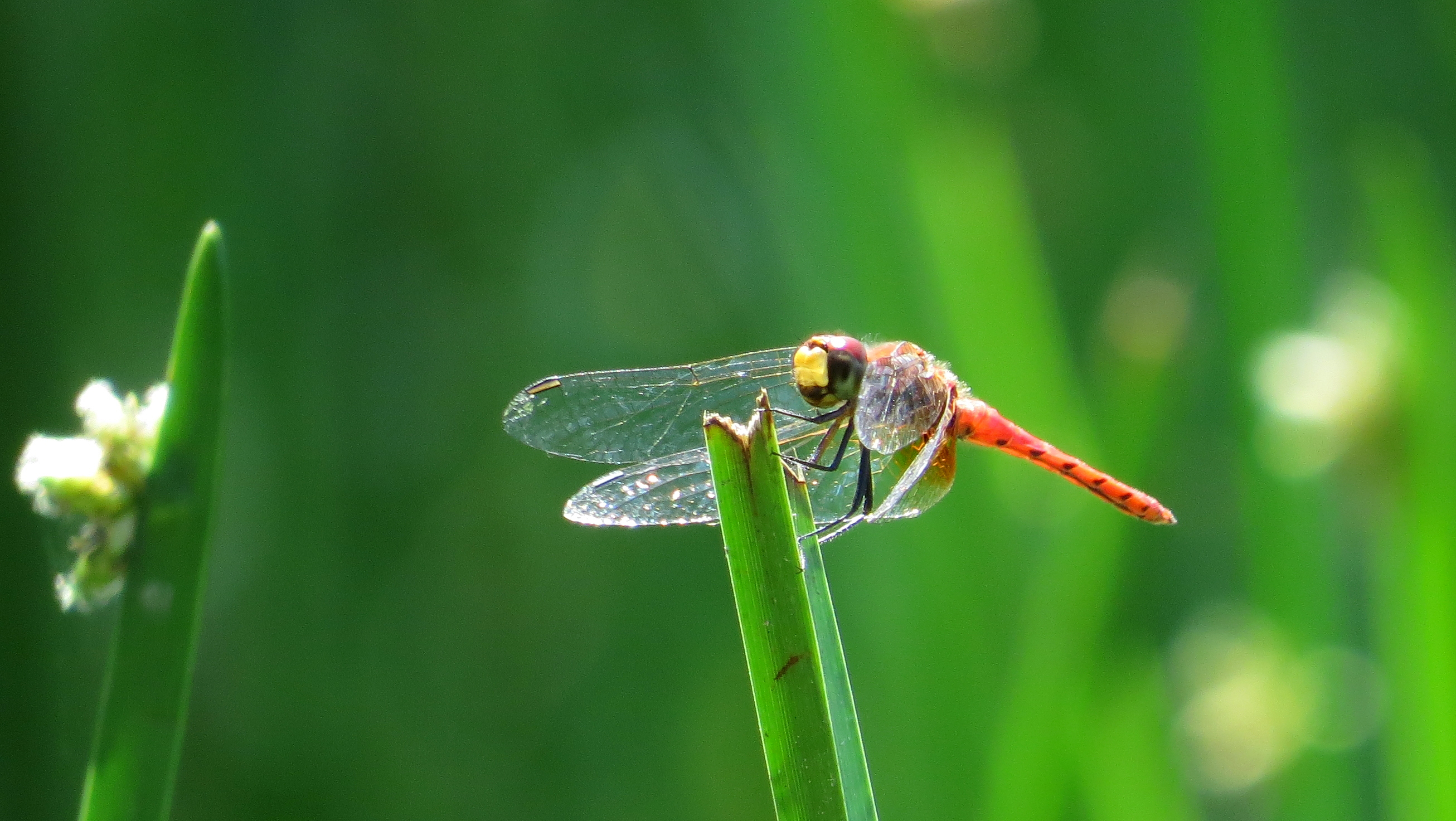
Male with bright yellow on face

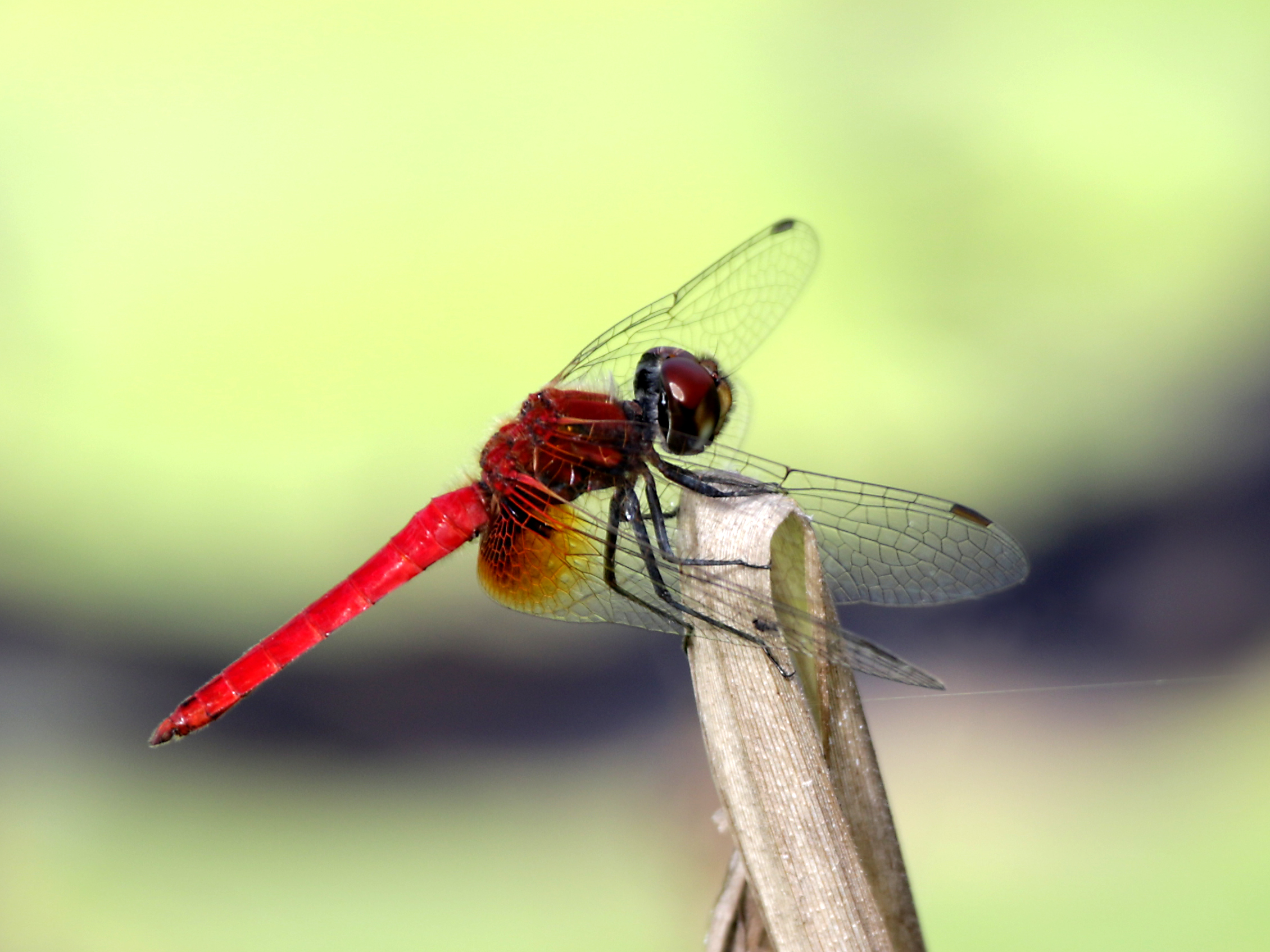
Male, Cairns, Queensland

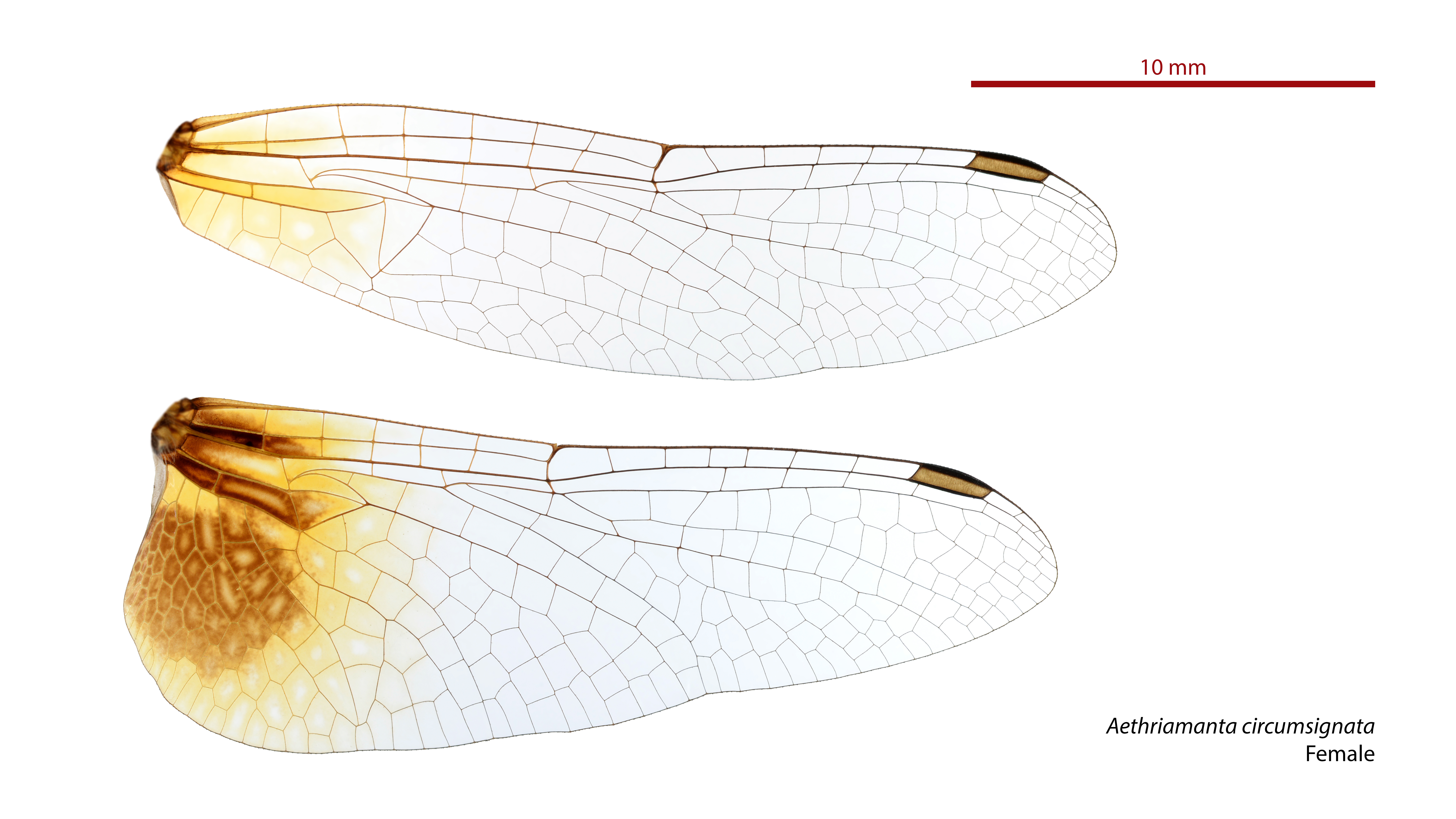
Female wings

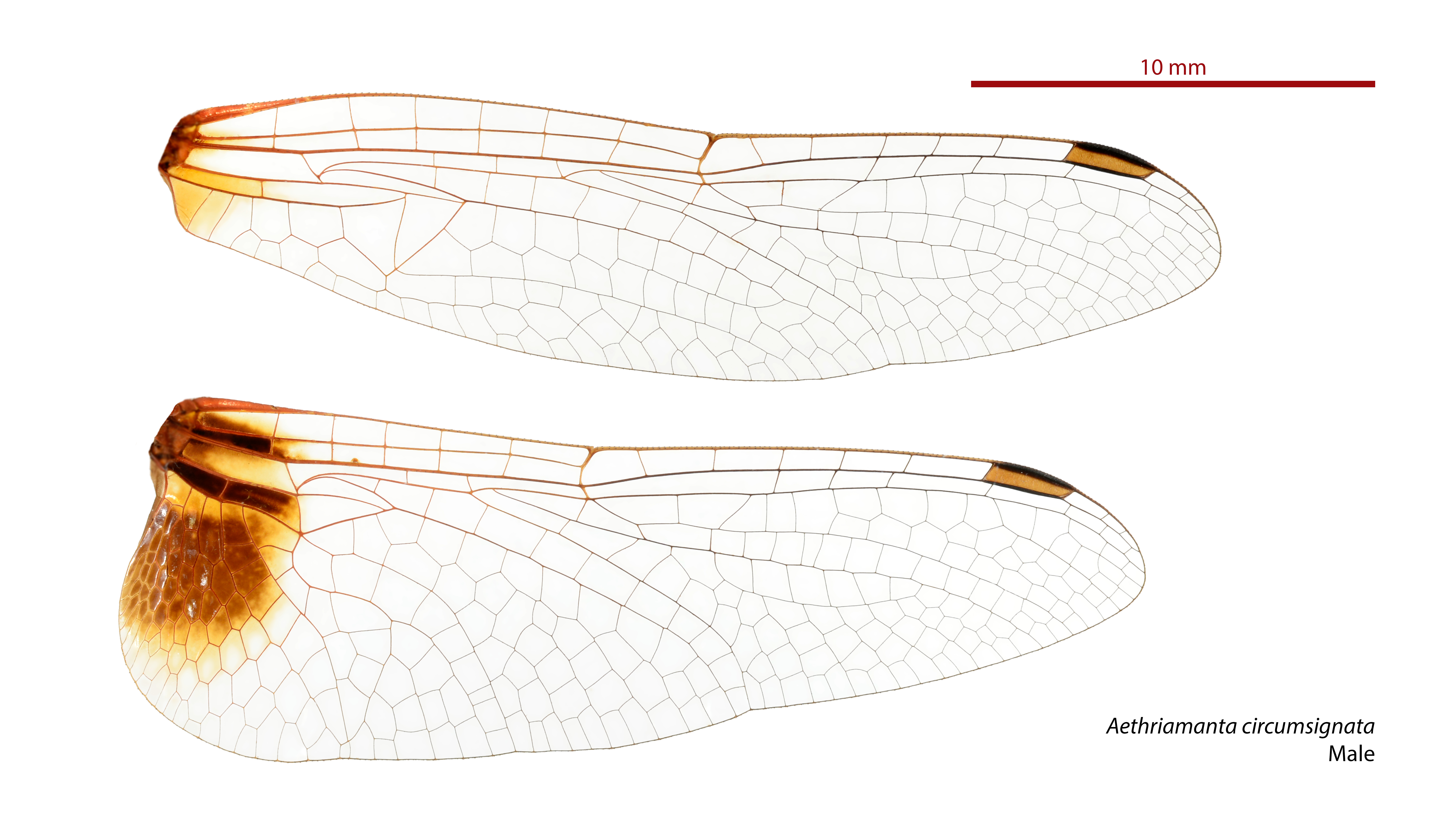
Male wings

== See also ==
- List of Odonata species of Australia
