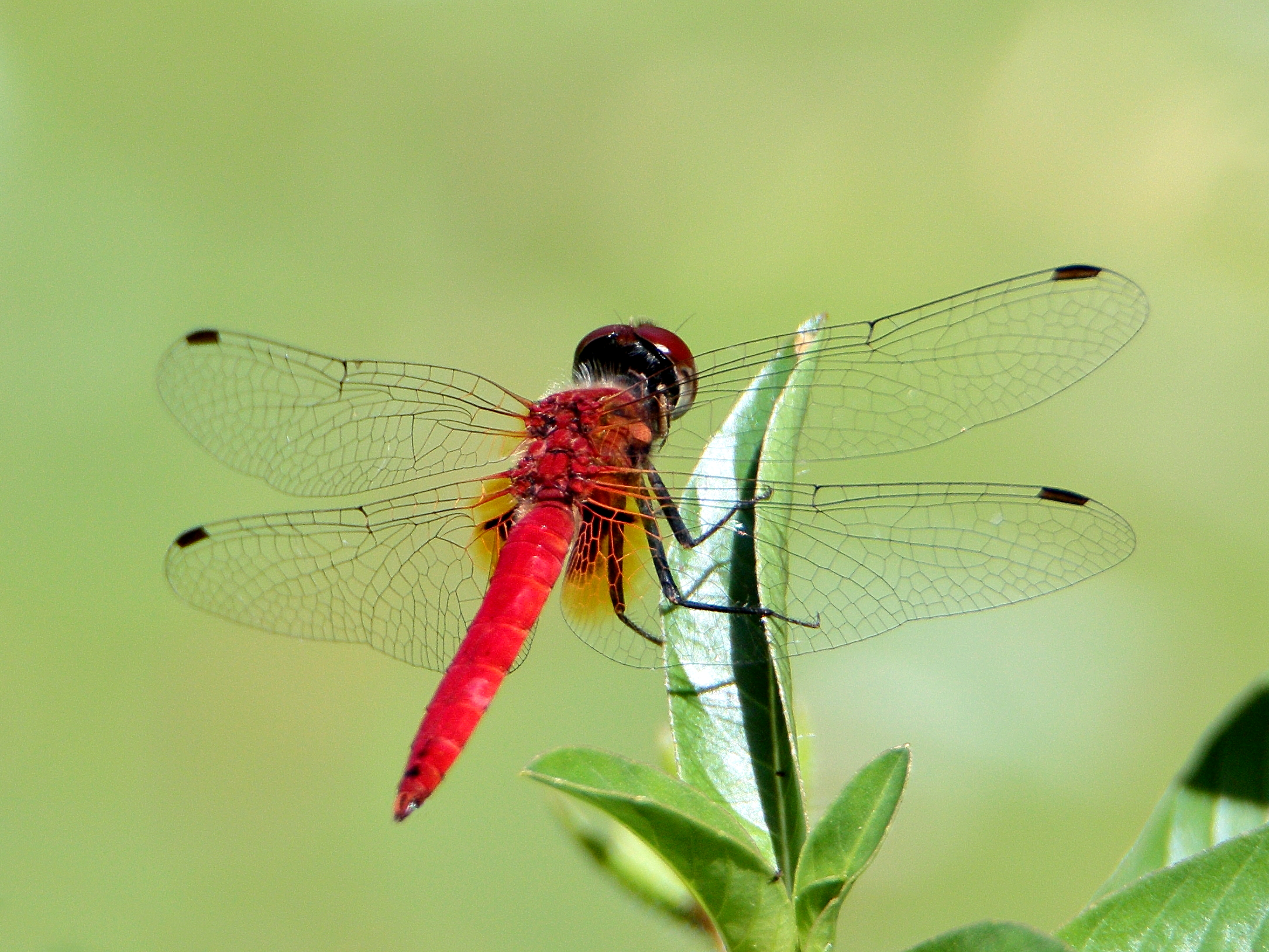
- L-Spot Basker in Cairns

Conservation status
- Least Concern (IUCN 3.1)

Scientific classification
- Kingdom: Animalia
- Phylum: Arthropoda
- Clade: Pancrustacea
- Class: Insecta
- Order: Odonata
- Suborder: Anisoptera
- Superfamily: Libelluloidea
- Family: Libellulidae
- Genus: Aethriamanta
- Species: A. nymphaeae

Binomial name
- Aethriamanta nymphaeae Lieftinck, 1949

= Aethriamanta nymphaeae =

L-spot basker

Species of dragonfly

Aethriamanta nymphaeae is a species of dragonfly of the family Libellulidae, commonly known as the L-spot basker. It inhabits lagoons ponds and swamps across northern Australia.

== Identification ==
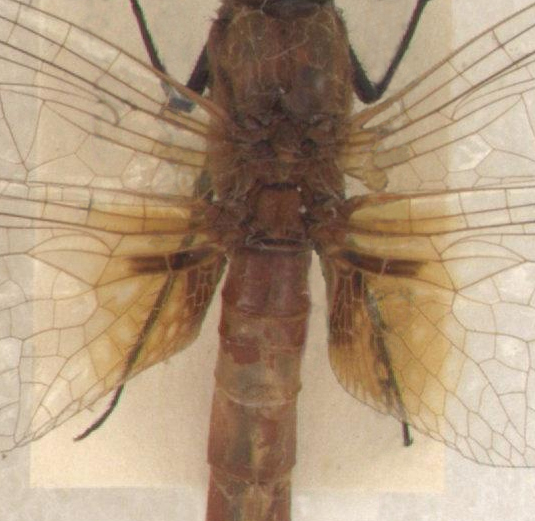
L-spot basker detail

The L-spot basker Aethriamanta nymphaeae and Square-spot basker Aethriamanta circumsignata are very similar dragonflies and can be difficult to separate. The common name describes dark markings at the base of the hindwing of each species. The L-spot basker usually has one dark brown fleck radiating between the fourth and fifth vein (Cu and A) and a small dark patch at right angles which occupies a few cells parallel to the abdomen. These marks form the L shape. A lighter brown surrounds the dark marks and may extend to the arculus and hindwing margin. Light brown marks may also exist at the base of the forewing. In some examples of the L-spot basker, the dark markings may be absent altogether.

== Etymology ==
The genus name Aethriamanta combines the Greek αἴθρα (aithra, "bright sky") with the Latin amans ("loving"), possibly meaning "loving the bright sky".

The species name nymphaeae is named for Nymphaea, the genus of waterlilies, derived from the Greek νυμφαία (nymphaia, "waterlily"), referring to the waterlily ponds of Lake Sentani, west of Hollandia, northern New Guinea, where the original specimens of this species were collected.

== Gallery ==
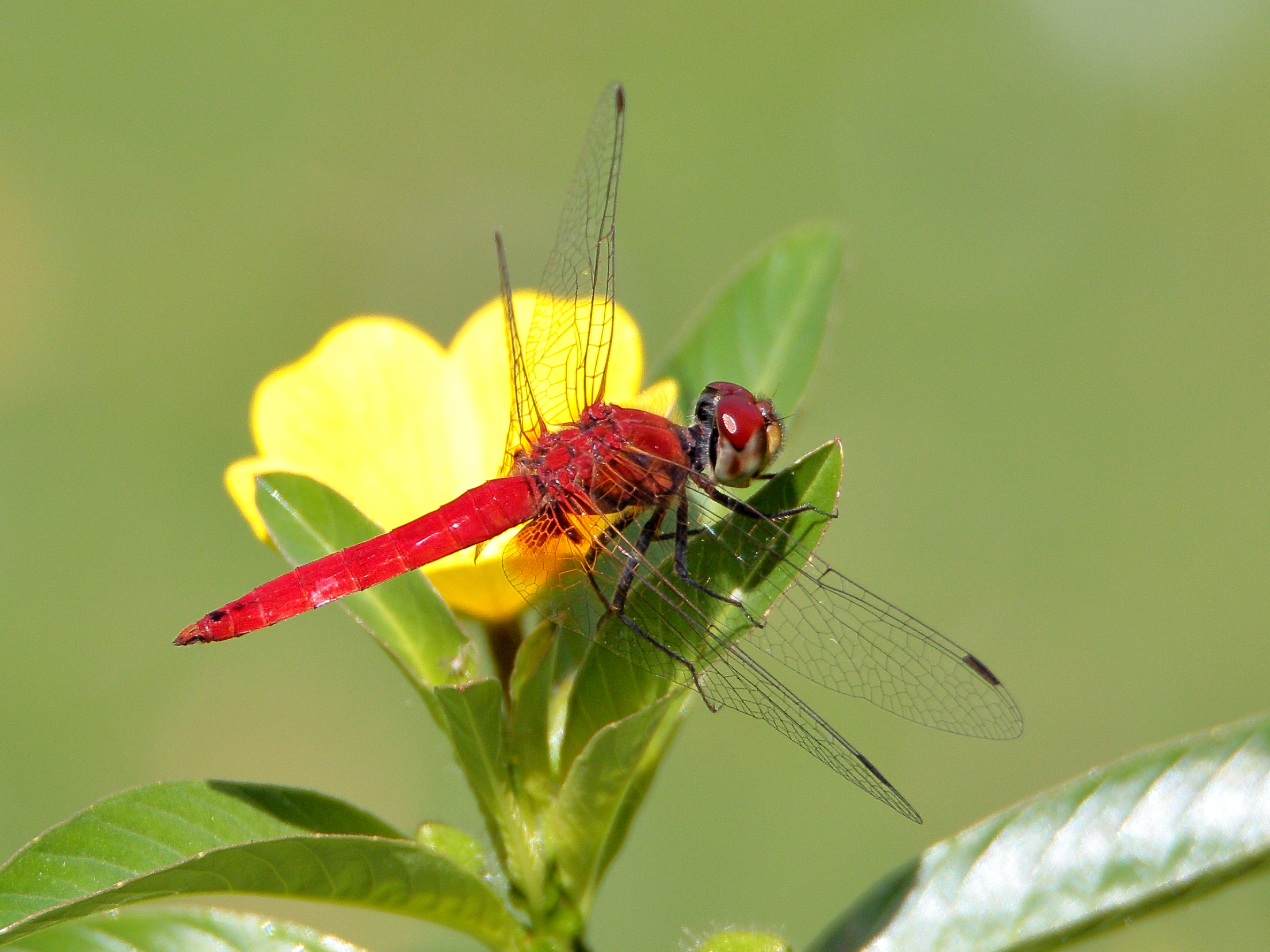
Male, Cairns, Australia

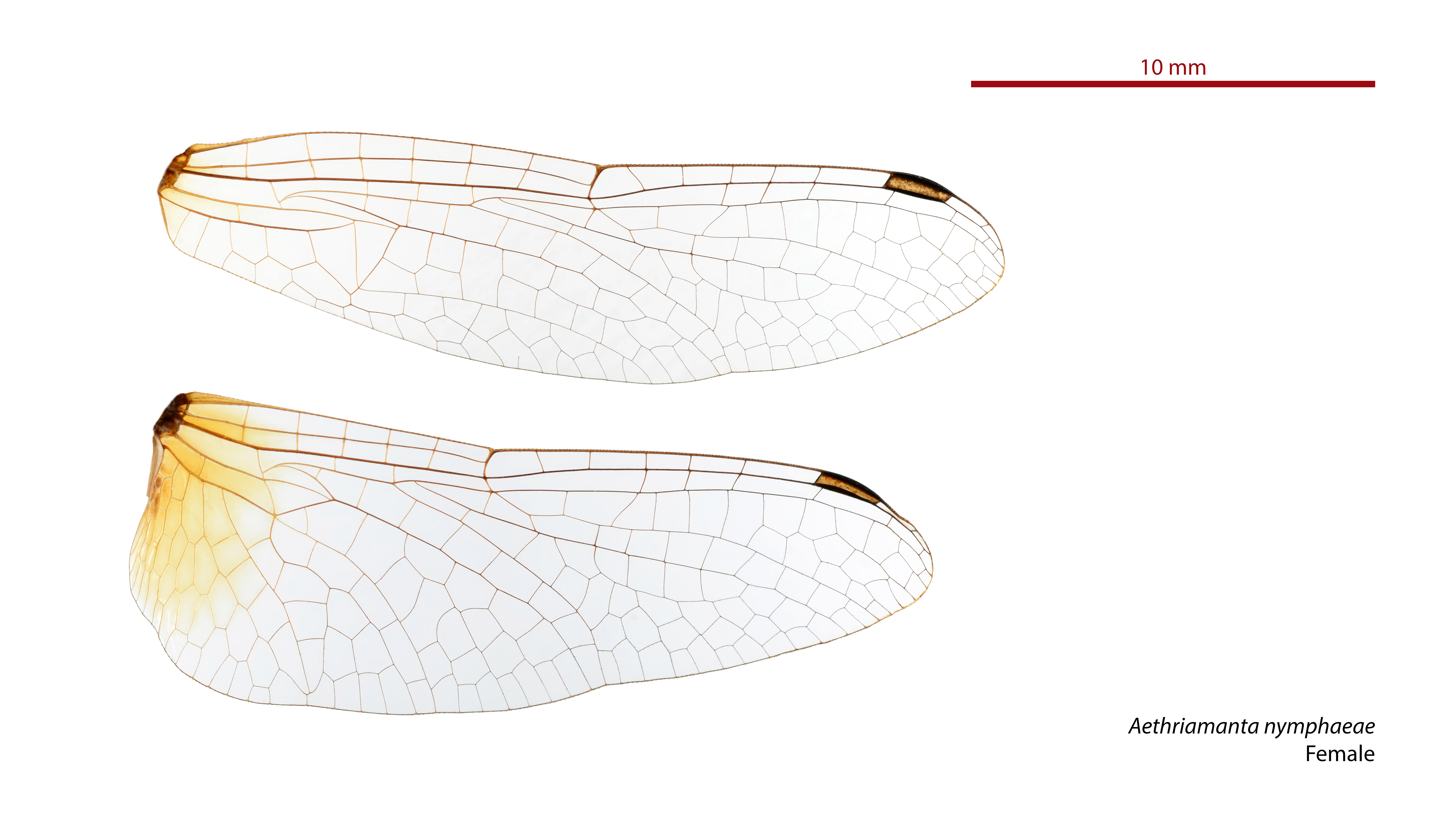
Female wings

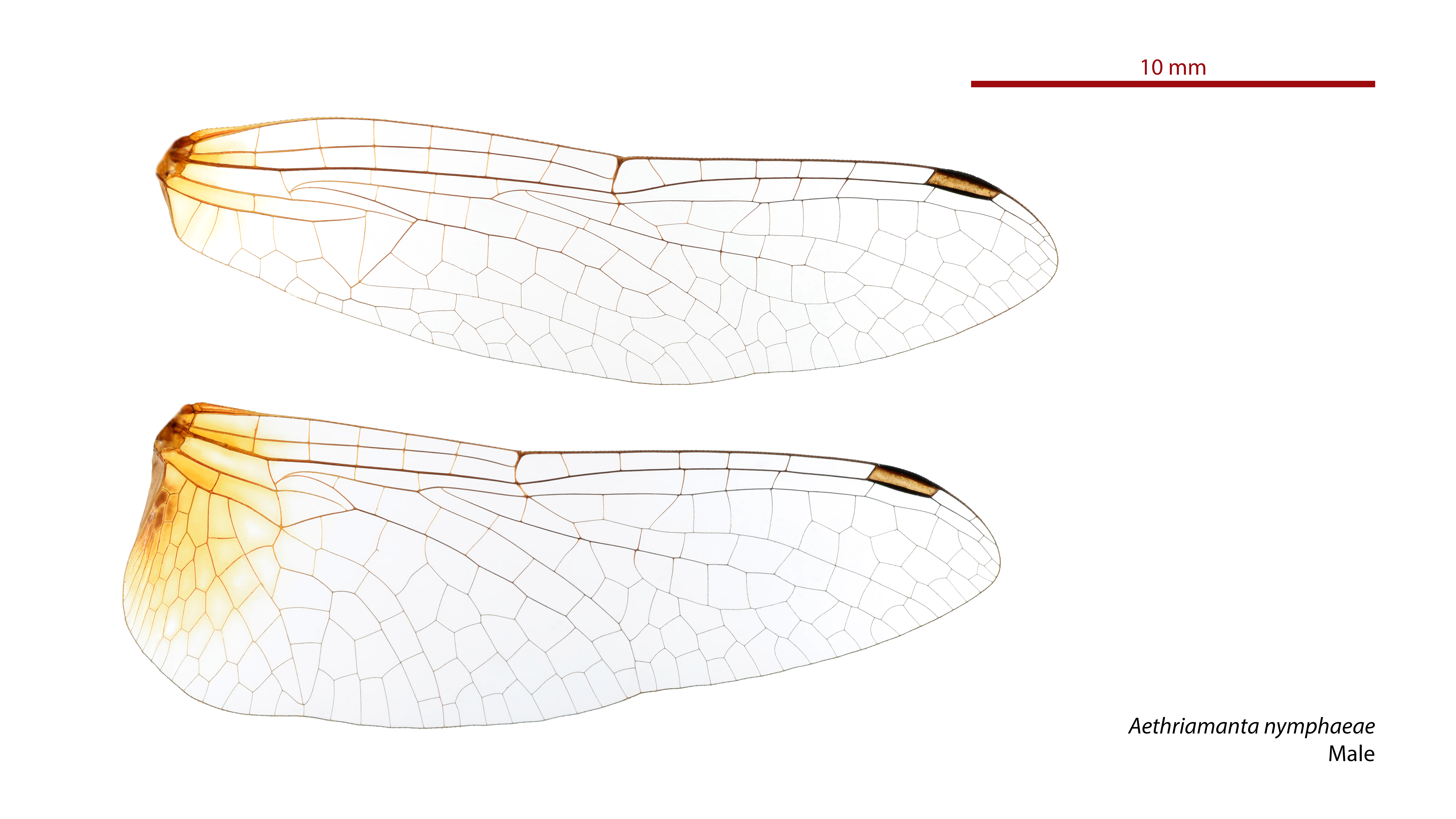
Male wings

== See also ==
- List of Odonata species of Australia
