= Aethriamanta aethra =

Conservation status
- Least Concern (IUCN 3.1)

Scientific classification
- Kingdom: Animalia
- Phylum: Arthropoda
- Class: Insecta
- Order: Odonata
- Infraorder: Anisoptera
- Family: Libellulidae
- Genus: Aethriamanta
- Species: A. aethra

Binomial name
- Aethriamanta aethra Ris, 1912

Species of dragonfly

Aethriamanta aethra is a species of dragonfly in the family Libellulidae. It is native to Cambodia, Indonesia, Malaysia, Singapore, Thailand, and Vietnam. It lives in marshy habitat, such as swamps, mangroves, and ponds.
