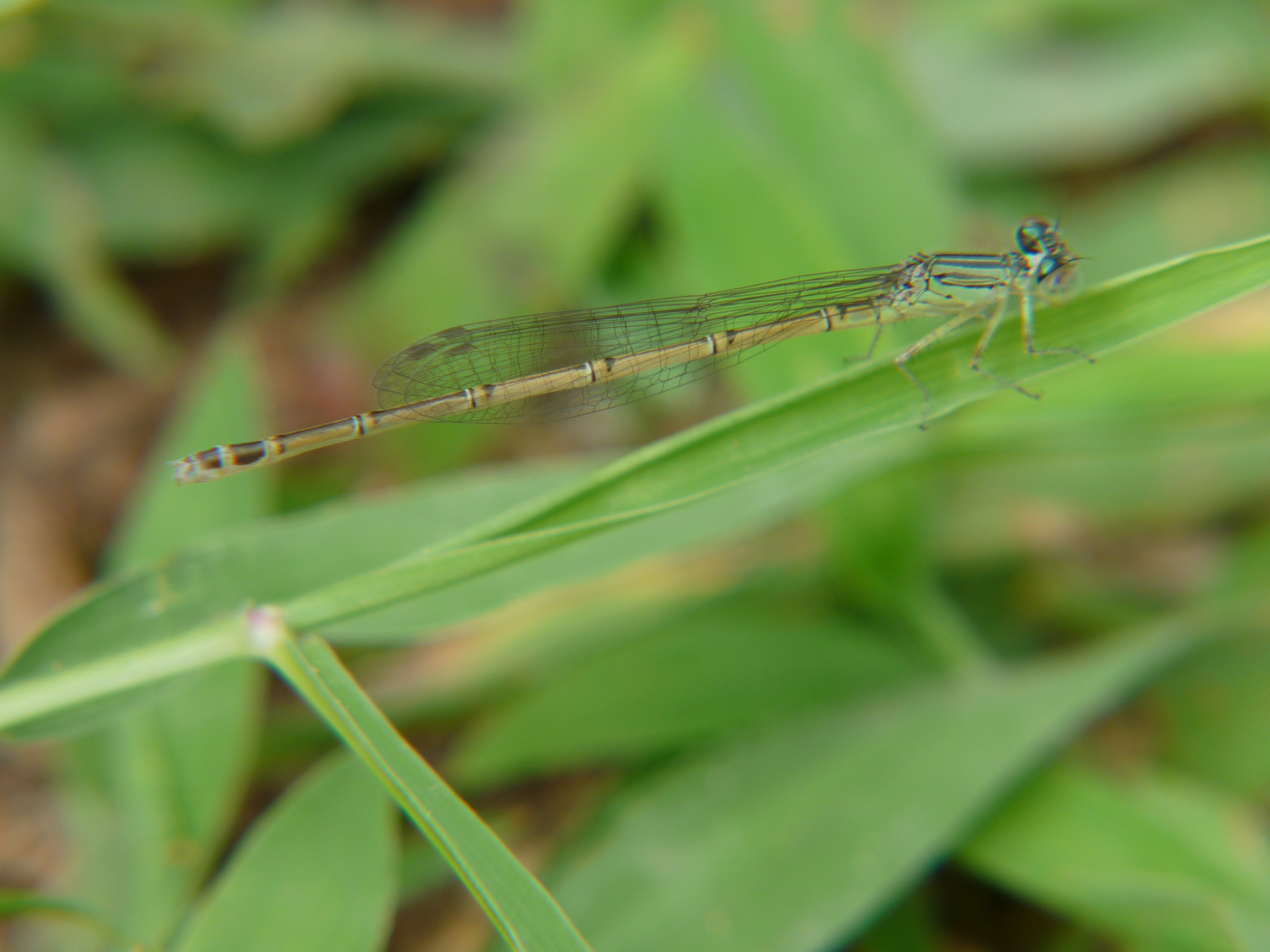
- Paracercion hieroglyphicum

Scientific classification
- Kingdom: Animalia
- Phylum: Arthropoda
- Class: Insecta
- Order: Odonata
- Suborder: Zygoptera
- Family: Coenagrionidae
- Genus: Paracercion; Weekers & Dumont, 2004

= Paracercion =

Genus of damselflies

Paracercion is a small genus of damselflies in the family Coenagrionidae. They are commonly known as lilysquatters.

The genus includes the following species:

- Paracercion barbatum (Needham, 1930)
- Paracercion calamorum (Ris, 1916) - Dusky Lilysquatter
- Paracercion hieroglyphicum (Brauer, 1865)
- Paracercion impar (Needham, 1930)
- Paracercion melanotum (Selys, 1876) - Eastern Lilysquatter
- Paracercion plagiosum (Needham, 1930)
- Paracercion sieboldii (Selys, 1876)
- Paracercion v-nigrum (Needham, 1930)
