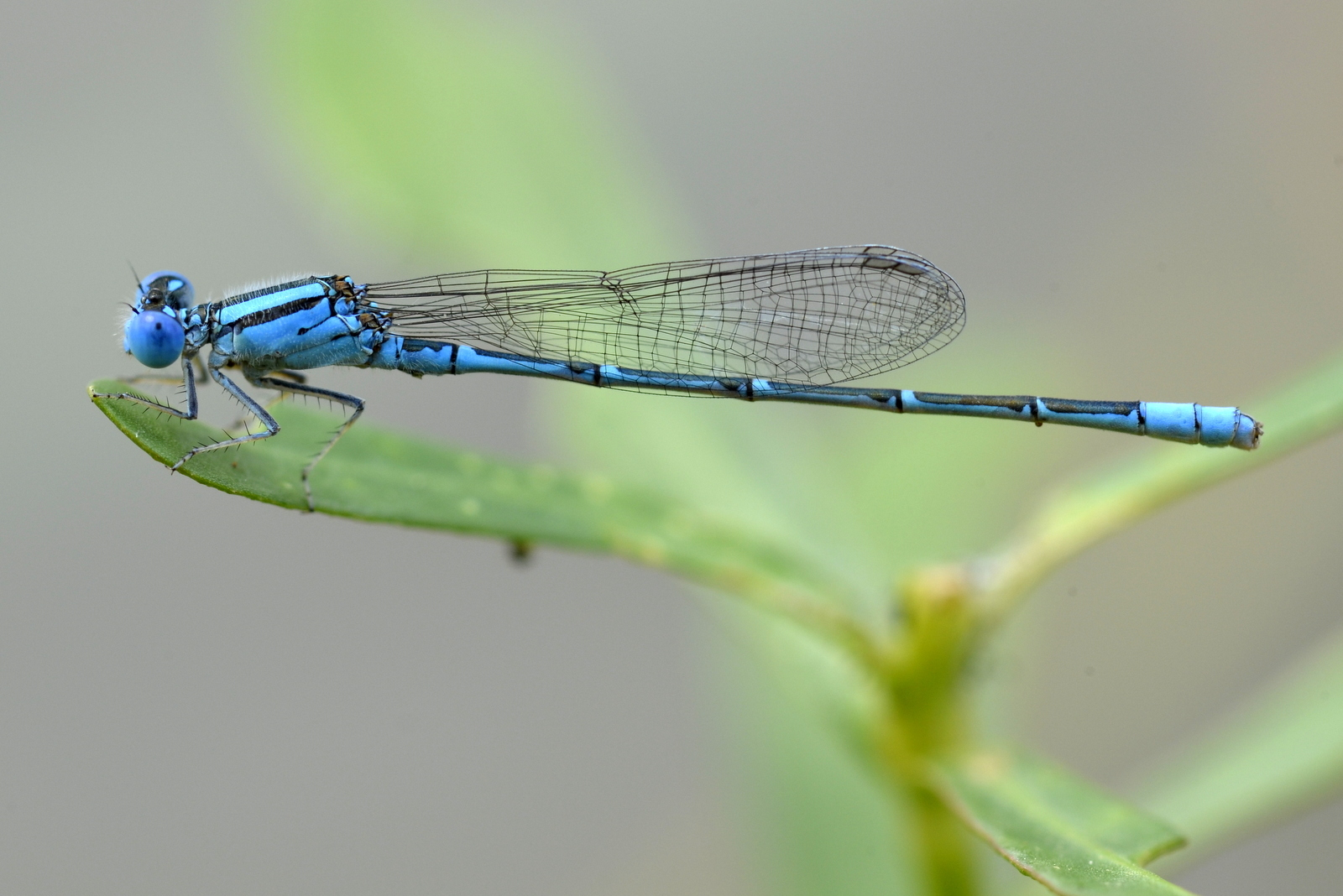
- Male

Conservation status
- Least Concern (IUCN 3.1)

Scientific classification
- Kingdom: Animalia
- Phylum: Arthropoda
- Class: Insecta
- Order: Odonata
- Suborder: Zygoptera
- Family: Coenagrionidae
- Genus: Paracercion
- Species: P. melanotum

Binomial name
- Paracercion melanotum (Selys, 1876)

Synonyms
- Enallagma melanotum Selys, 1876; Enallagma malayanum Selys, 1876; Paracercion malayanum (Selys, 1876); Coenagrion malayanum Selys, 1876; Agrion sexlineatum Selys, 1883; Coenagrion admirationis Navás, 1933; Coenagrion trilineatum Navás, 1933; Coenagrion pendulum Needham & Gyger, 1939

= Paracercion melanotum =

Eastern lilysquatter

Species of damselfly

Paracercion melanotum, also known as the eastern lilysquatter, is a species of damselfly in the family Coenagrionidae. It is known to occur in China, Taiwan, South Korea, Japan, Vietnam, India, Sri Lanka, Nepal, Java, Philippines and Thailand.

== Taxonomy ==
Species delimitation study based on COI, ITS, and morphological evidence concluded that P. pendulum and P. malayanum were synonymized as junior synonyms of P. melanotum.

== Description and habitat ==
It is a medium sized damselfly with deep blue eyes. Its thorax is black on dorsum with very broad azure blue antehumeral stripes, which are very narrow or missing in Paracercion calamorum. Lateral sides of thorax are blue with a fine black line on the upper part of each lateral suture. No pruinescence compared to P. calamorum. Its wings are transparent and pterostigma is yellow, framed with heavy black nervures. Its abdomen is azure blue with broad black dorsal marks up to segment 7. Segment 2 has a distinct broad dorsal spot shaped like a thistle-head connected narrowly to a fine apical ring. This mark will help to distinguish it from Pseudagrion species. Segment 10 has a narrow mid-dorsal black streak. Female is dull green in colors. Its abdomen is similar to the male. But the lateral ground colour is yellowish red and segments 8 and 9 are broadly black on dorsum. Segment 10 is blue only in the apical border.

It breeds in shallow lakes, ponds and paddy fields in the lowland, perches on the floating vegetation.

== See also ==
- List of odonates of India
- List of odonata of Kerala
