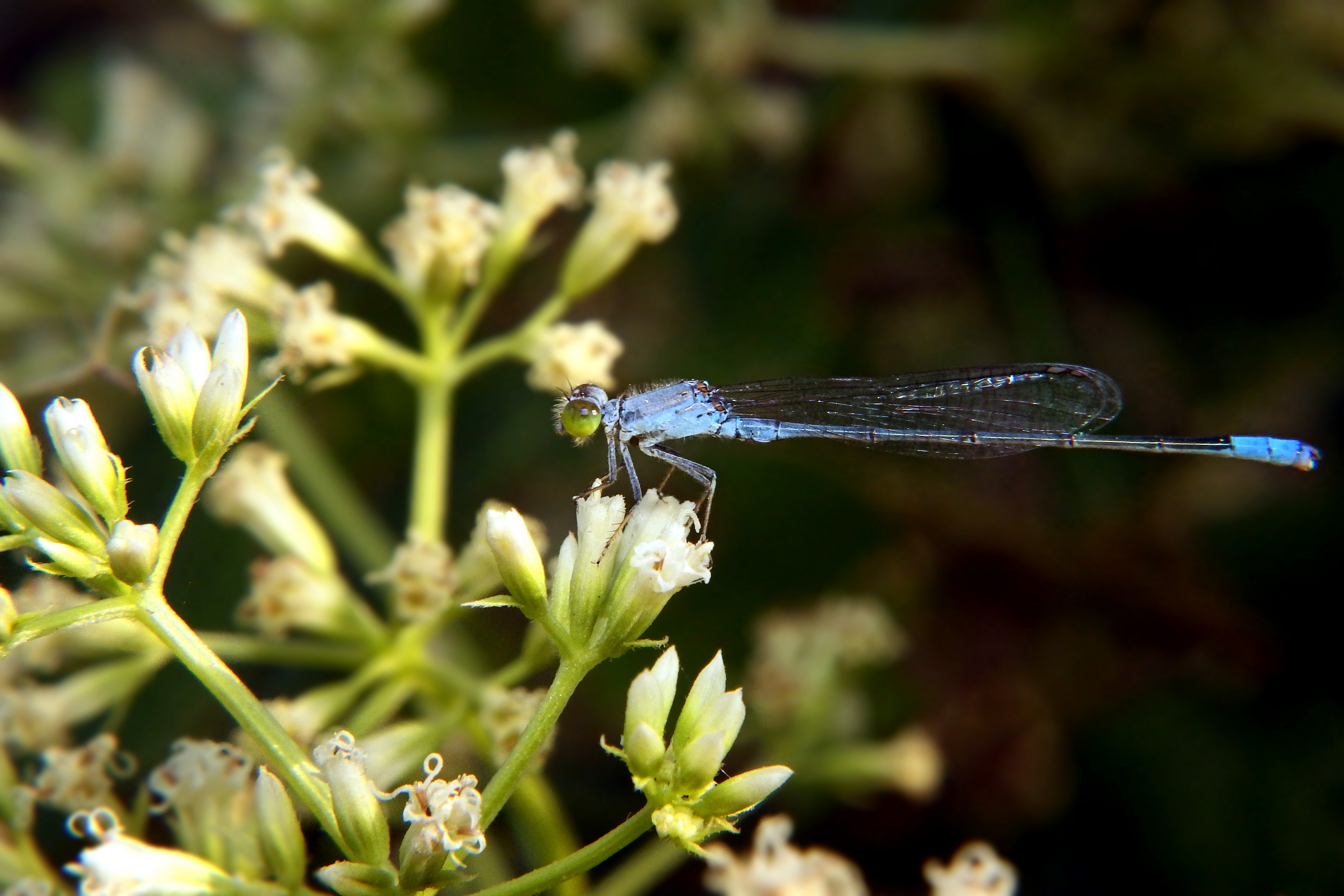
- Male
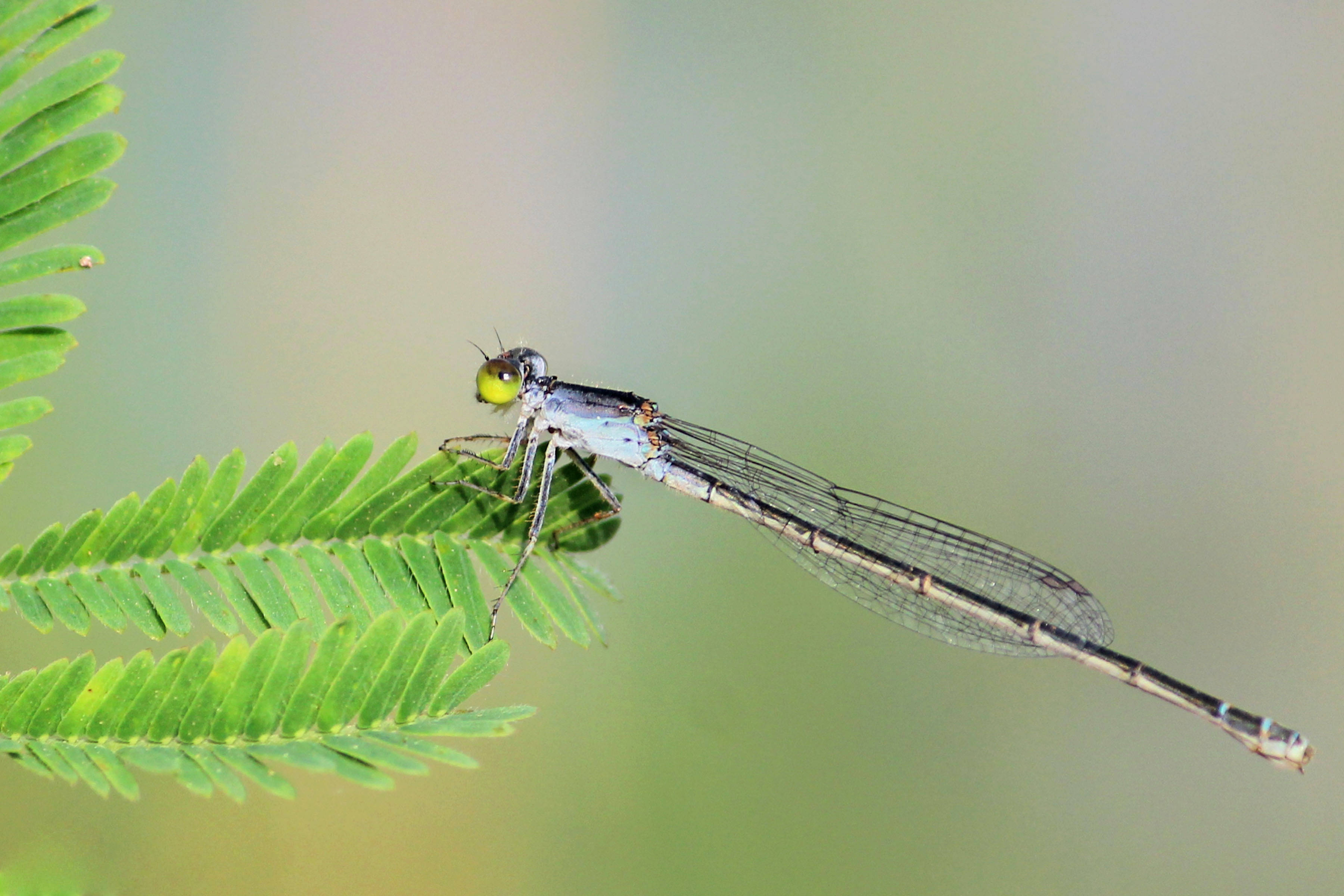
- Female

Conservation status
- Least Concern (IUCN 3.1)

Scientific classification
- Kingdom: Animalia
- Phylum: Arthropoda
- Class: Insecta
- Order: Odonata
- Suborder: Zygoptera
- Family: Coenagrionidae
- Genus: Paracercion
- Species: P. calamorum

Binomial name
- Paracercion calamorum (Ris, 1916)

Synonyms
- Agrion calamorus Ris, 1916; Argiocnemis dyeri Fraser, 1919; Argiocnemis gravelyi Fraser, 1919; Coenagrion violacea Fraser, 1924

= Paracercion calamorum =

Species of damselfly

Paracercion calamorum, the dusky lilly-squatter, is a species of damselfly in the family Coenagrionidae. It has a range that extends from southern far-eastern Russia to Japan, and to India and Indonesia. The nominate subspecies P. c. calamorum is known from central and eastern China, Korea and Japan. The subspecies P. c. dyeri occurs in southern China, Hong Kong, Taiwan, Indonesia, India, Nepal, and Thailand.

== Description and habitat ==
It is a medium-sized damselfly with brown-capped yellowish green eyes. Its thorax is black on dorsum without any or very fine azure blue antehumeral stripes, which are very broad in Paracercion malayanum. Lateral sides of thorax are greenish blue with a fine black line on the upper part of each lateral suture. In old males, all these marks are obscured by bluish white pruinescence. Its wings are transparent and pterostigma is yellow, framed with heavy black nervures. Its abdomen is azure blue with broad black dorsal marks up to segment 7. Segment 2 has a distinct broad dorsal spot connected narrowly to a fine apical ring. This mark will help to distinguish it from Pseudagrion species. Segment 10 has a narrow mid-dorsal black streak. Female is dull in colors. Its abdomen is similar to the male. But the lateral ground colour is greenish-yellow and segments 8 and 9 are broadly black on dorsum. Segment 10 is bluish-green. Female also get pruinosed when aged.

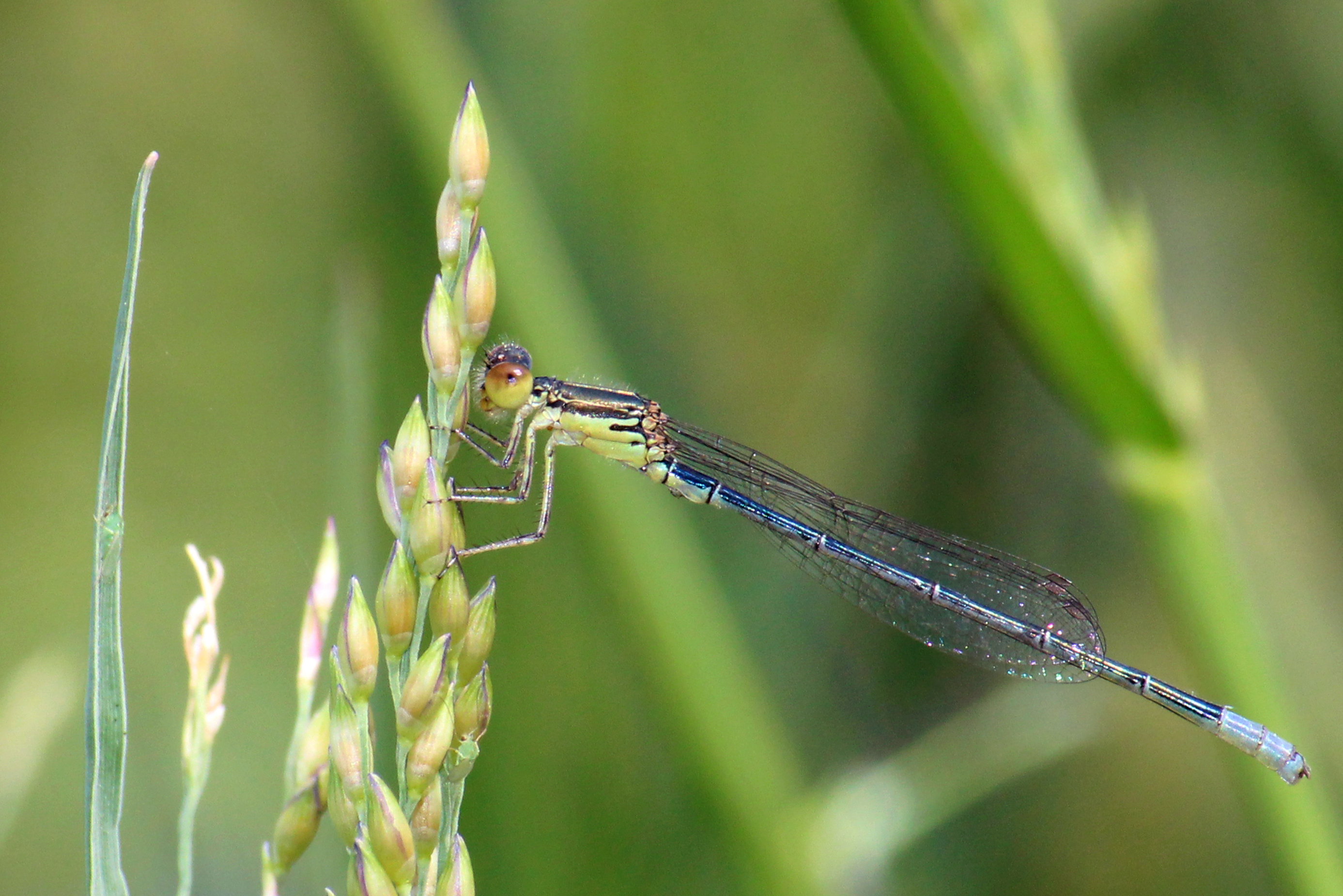
Male (sub-adult), showing all marks

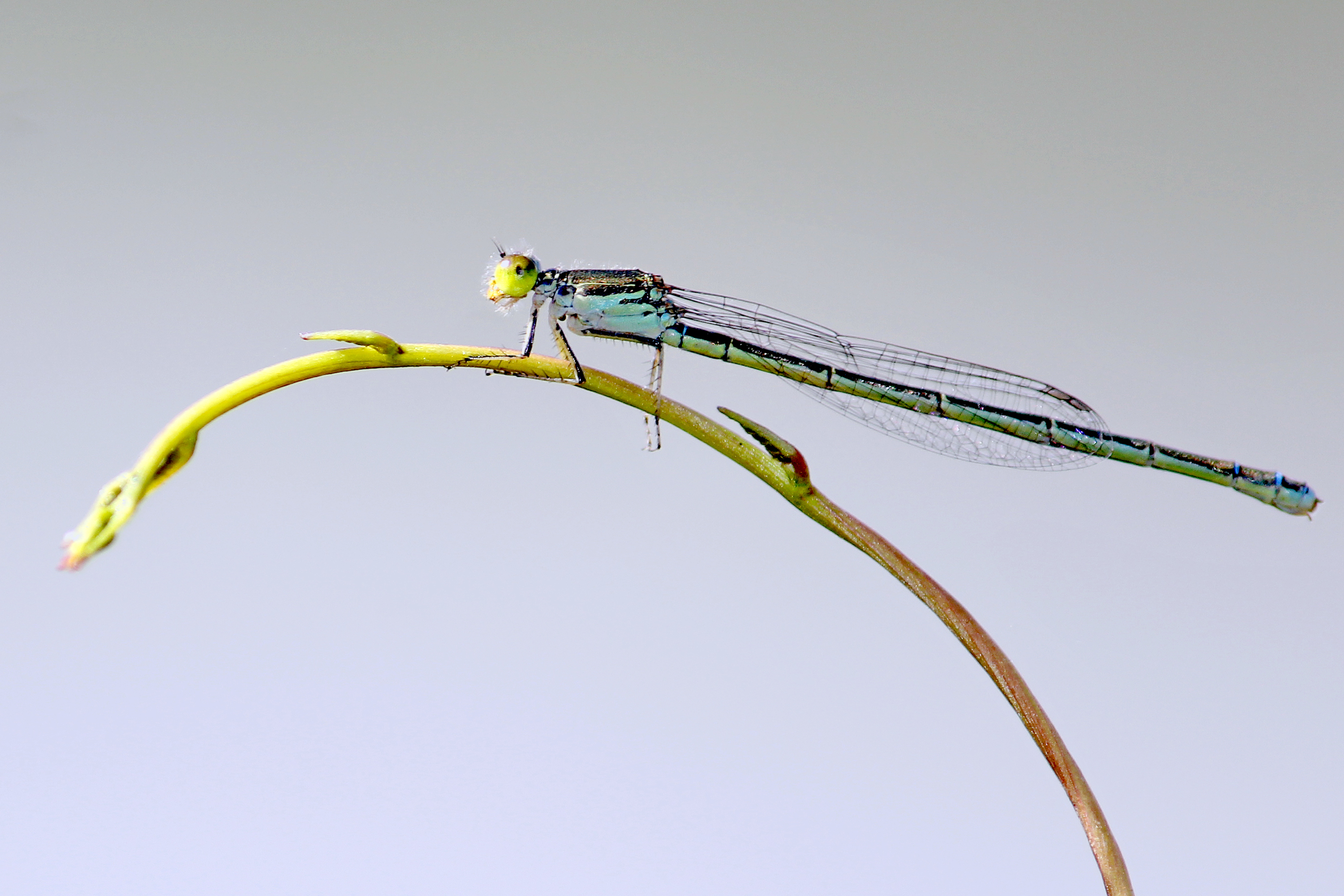
Female (sub-adult), showing all marks

It breeds in stagnant and weedy ponds, resting flat on floating grasses and lotus leaves. Eggs are inserted well within the up-curled rim of the lotus leaf or any other floating vegetation.

== See also ==
- List of odonates of India
- List of odonata of Kerala
