= Bodilus longispina =

Scientific classification
- Kingdom: Animalia
- Phylum: Arthropoda
- Clade: Pancrustacea
- Class: Insecta
- Order: Coleoptera
- Suborder: Polyphaga
- Infraorder: Scarabaeiformia
- Family: Scarabaeidae
- Genus: Bodilus
- Species: B. longispina

Binomial name
- Bodilus longispina (Küster, 1854)

Synonyms
- Aphodius longispina Küster, 1854

Species of beetle

Bodilus longispina is a species of beetle of the family Scarabaeidae. It is found in Algeria, Egypt, Italy (Sicily, Sardinia), Libya, Malta, Morocco, Spain and Tunisia.

== Description ==
Adults reach a length of about 6–7.5 mm (0.24–0.30 in). They are very similar to Bodilus marani, but the tips of the elytra are more distinctly hairy and glossy. The pronotum is bordered with yellowish-red along the sides and along the base.
