= Bodilus circumcinctus =

Scientific classification
- Kingdom: Animalia
- Phylum: Arthropoda
- Clade: Pancrustacea
- Class: Insecta
- Order: Coleoptera
- Suborder: Polyphaga
- Infraorder: Scarabaeiformia
- Family: Scarabaeidae
- Genus: Bodilus
- Species: B. circumcinctus

Binomial name
- Bodilus circumcinctus (Schmidt, 1840)

Synonyms
- Aphodius circumcinctus Schmidt, 1840; Aphodius limbatus Germar, 1823

Species of beetle

Bodilus circumcinctus is a species of beetle of the family Scarabaeidae. It is found in Austria, Bulgaria, Croatia, Hungary, Kazakhstan, Kyrgyzstan, Macedonia, Moldova, Romania, Russia, Serbia, Slovakia, Tajikistan, Turkmenistan, Ukraine and Uzbekistan.

== Description ==
Adults reach a length of about 6–7 mm (0.24–0.28 in). They have a quite strongly convex body. The forebody is black, the pronotum with yellow-red sides. The scutellum is dark and the elytra are yellow-brown, with a darker patch. The legs are light brown.
