= Bodilus holgati =

Scientific classification
- Kingdom: Animalia
- Phylum: Arthropoda
- Clade: Pancrustacea
- Class: Insecta
- Order: Coleoptera
- Suborder: Polyphaga
- Infraorder: Scarabaeiformia
- Family: Scarabaeidae
- Genus: Bodilus
- Species: B. holgati

Binomial name
- Bodilus holgati (Endrödi, 1983)

Synonyms
- Aphodius (Bodilus) holgati Endrödi, 1983

Species of beetle

Bodilus holgati is a species of beetle of the family Scarabaeidae. It is found in South Africa (Cape).

== Description ==
Adults reach a length of about 6–8 mm (0.24–0.31 in). They have a long, uniformly yellowish-brown body.
