= Bodilus crassus =

Scientific classification
- Kingdom: Animalia
- Phylum: Arthropoda
- Clade: Pancrustacea
- Class: Insecta
- Order: Coleoptera
- Suborder: Polyphaga
- Infraorder: Scarabaeiformia
- Family: Scarabaeidae
- Genus: Bodilus
- Species: B. crassus

Binomial name
- Bodilus crassus (Schmidt, 1917)

Synonyms
- Aphodius (Bodilus) crassus Schmidt, 1917

Species of beetle

Bodilus crassus is a species of beetle of the family Scarabaeidae. It is found in northern Mongolia.

== Description ==
Adults reach a length of about 5–5.5 mm (0.20–0.22 in). They have an elongate-oval, shiny, glabrous, yellowish-brown body, with the disc of the pronotum and sometimes the back of the head dark reddish-brown. In some specimens, there is a darker longitudinal spot behind the shoulders on the elytra.
