= Bodilus =

Scientific classification
- Kingdom: Animalia
- Phylum: Arthropoda
- Clade: Pancrustacea
- Class: Insecta
- Order: Coleoptera
- Suborder: Polyphaga
- Infraorder: Scarabaeiformia
- Family: Scarabaeidae
- Subfamily: Aphodiinae
- Tribe: Aphodiini
- Genus: Bodilus; Mulsant & Rey, 1870

Synonyms
- Aphodius (Neobodilus) Hollande & Thérond, 1998; Aphodius (Paramelinopterus) Rakovič, 1984; Aphodius (Lunaphodius) Balthasar, 1964; Aphodius (Melaphodius) Reitter, 1892; Aphodius (Therilus) Mulsant & Rey, 1870

Genus of beetles

Bodilus is a genus of beetles of the family Scarabaeidae.

== Species ==
- Bodilus acutifrons (Petrovitz, 1958)
- Bodilus amabilis (Boheman, 1857)
- Bodilus angolensis (Petrovitz, 1958)
- Bodilus apertus (Schmidt, 1909)
- Bodilus ardens (Harold, 1866)
- Bodilus ardescens (Schmidt, 1917)
- Bodilus arsissaensis (Petrovitz, 1968)
- Bodilus barbarus (Fairmaire, 1860)
- Bodilus beduinus (Reitter, 1892)
- Bodilus buxeipennis (Harold, 1871)
- Bodilus caspius (Ménétriés, 1832)
- Bodilus cathedralensis (Endrödi, 1991)
- Bodilus circumcinctus (Schmidt, 1840)
- Bodilus comptifer (Petrovitz, 1958)
- Bodilus crassus (Schmidt, 1917)
- Bodilus damarinus (Kolbe, 1908)
- Bodilus edgardi (Solsky, 1876)
- Bodilus flagrans (Erichson, 1843)
- Bodilus furvus (Schmidt, 1917)
- Bodilus gregarius (Harold, 1871)
- Bodilus hammeri (Petrovitz, 1958)
- Bodilus hastatus (Reitter, 1892)
- Bodilus holgati (Endrödi, 1983)
- Bodilus insperatus (Petrovitz, 1967)
- Bodilus inylchekensis (Frolov, 2001)
- Bodilus karrooensis (Endrödi, 1983)
- Bodilus kaznakovi (Frolov, 2001)
- Bodilus kermanschahensis (Petrovitz, 1959)
- Bodilus kububanus (Kolbe, 1908)
- Bodilus laetus (Wiedemann, 1823)
- Bodilus laterosetosus (Petrovitz, 1958)
- Bodilus liesenfeldti (Petrovitz, 1958)
- Bodilus loeffleri (Petrovitz, 1963)
- Bodilus longeciliatus (Reitter, 1887)
- Bodilus longispina (Küster, 1854)
- Bodilus lucidulus (Boheman, 1857)
- Bodilus lugens (Creutzer, 1799)
- Bodilus lunifer (Solsky, 1876)
- Bodilus marani (Balthasar, 1929)
- Bodilus marshalli (Paulian, 1942)
- Bodilus nigriventris (Reitter, 1892)
- Bodilus noxius (Schmidt, 1917)
- Bodilus nylsvleyicus (Endrödi, 1980)
- Bodilus oblatus (Bordat, 1996)
- Bodilus pantherinus (Petrovitz, 1963)
- Bodilus punctipennis (Erichson, 1848)
- Bodilus sabaeus (Peyerimhoff, 1907)
- Bodilus saoudi (Paulian, 1980)
- Bodilus sordescens (Harold, 1869)
- Bodilus strigilatus (Roth, 1851)
- Bodilus terminassianae (Kolov & Nikolajev, 2011)
- Bodilus transvaalensis (Endrödi, 1979)
- Bodilus veselyi (Tesař, 1969)
- Bodilus zarudnyi (Frolov, 2001)
- Bodilus zunbajanicus (Stebnicka, 1975)
