= Bodilus cathedralensis =

Scientific classification
- Kingdom: Animalia
- Phylum: Arthropoda
- Clade: Pancrustacea
- Class: Insecta
- Order: Coleoptera
- Suborder: Polyphaga
- Infraorder: Scarabaeiformia
- Family: Scarabaeidae
- Genus: Bodilus
- Species: B. cathedralensis

Binomial name
- Bodilus cathedralensis (Endrödi, 1991)

Synonyms
- Aphodius (Bodilus) cathedralensis Endrödi, 1991

Species of beetle

Bodilus cathedralensis is a species of beetle of the family Scarabaeidae. It is found in South Africa (KwaZulu-Natal).

== Description ==
Adults reach a length of about 6 mm (0.24 in). They have a black, shiny body, with the margins of the head, anterior angles of the pronotum and legs dark reddish, while the mouthparts and shafts of the antennae are yellow.

== Life history ==
Specimens have been collected from cattle dung.
