= Bodilus liesenfeldti =

Scientific classification
- Kingdom: Animalia
- Phylum: Arthropoda
- Clade: Pancrustacea
- Class: Insecta
- Order: Coleoptera
- Suborder: Polyphaga
- Infraorder: Scarabaeiformia
- Family: Scarabaeidae
- Genus: Bodilus
- Species: B. liesenfeldti

Binomial name
- Bodilus liesenfeldti (Petrovitz, 1958)

Synonyms
- Aphodius (Loboparius) liesenfeldti Petrovitz, 1958; Aphodius (Bodilus) pakistanus Balthasar, 1961

Species of beetle

Bodilus liesenfeldti is a species of beetle of the family Scarabaeidae. It is found in India (Sikkim, Uttarakhand, Haryana) and Pakistan.

== Description ==
Adults reach a length of about 4–5.5 mm (0.16–0.22 in). They have a strongly convex, fairly parallel-sided, glossy body. The head, pronotum, scutellum, elytral suture and the tips of the elytra are dark reddish-brown, while the rest is light reddish-brown to yellowish. The apical part of the elytra has yellowish hairs.
