= Bodilus insperatus =

Scientific classification
- Kingdom: Animalia
- Phylum: Arthropoda
- Clade: Pancrustacea
- Class: Insecta
- Order: Coleoptera
- Suborder: Polyphaga
- Infraorder: Scarabaeiformia
- Family: Scarabaeidae
- Genus: Bodilus
- Species: B. insperatus

Binomial name
- Bodilus insperatus (Petrovitz, 1967)

Synonyms
- Aphodius (Melinopterus) insperatus Petrovitz, 1967; Aphodius (Paramelinopterus) longipennis Rakovič, 1984

Species of beetle

Bodilus insperatus is a species of beetle of the family Scarabaeidae. It is found in Afghanistan, Iran and Pakistan.

== Description ==
Adults reach a length of about 6.5–7 mm (0.26–0.28 in). They have a parallel-sided, brownish-yellow body, with the disc of the pronotum with a darkened spot. The elytra are finely and shortly setaceous.
