= Bodilus punctipennis =

Scientific classification
- Kingdom: Animalia
- Phylum: Arthropoda
- Clade: Pancrustacea
- Class: Insecta
- Order: Coleoptera
- Suborder: Polyphaga
- Infraorder: Scarabaeiformia
- Family: Scarabaeidae
- Genus: Bodilus
- Species: B. punctipennis

Binomial name
- Bodilus punctipennis (Erichson, 1848)

Synonyms
- Aphodius punctipennis Erichson, 1848; Aphodius (Bodilus) vartiani Petrovitz, 1965; Aphodius (Bodilus) arvernicus Hoffmann, 1928; Aphodius incertus Ballion, 1878; Aphodius intermedius Ballion, 1871; Aphodius similis Sturm, 1843

Species of beetle

Bodilus punctipennis is a species of beetle of the family Scarabaeidae. It is found in Afghanistan, Armenia, Azerbaijan, Cyprus, Egypt, Georgia, Greece, Hungary, Iran, Iraq, Lithuania, Romania, Kazakhstan, Kyrgyzstan, Lebanon, Russia (including Siberia), Turkey, Turkmenistan and Ukraine.

== Description ==
Adults reach a length of about 6–7.5 mm (0.24–0.30 in). They have a moderately convex body, with the forebody glossy, while the elytra are often less glossy. They are yellowish-brown, with the pronotum and sides and sutural edge of the elytra reddish- to blackish-brown. The legs are either lighter or darker brown.
