= Bodilus lugens =

Scientific classification
- Kingdom: Animalia
- Phylum: Arthropoda
- Clade: Pancrustacea
- Class: Insecta
- Order: Coleoptera
- Suborder: Polyphaga
- Infraorder: Scarabaeiformia
- Family: Scarabaeidae
- Genus: Bodilus
- Species: B. lugens

Binomial name
- Bodilus lugens (Creutzer, 1799)

Synonyms
- Aphodius lugens Creutzer, 1799; Bodilus lugens discus Negrobov, 2016; Aphodius (Cinacanthus) apiceopacus Petrovitz, 1959; Aphodius lugens emarginalis Mulsant, 1842; Aphodius lugens indecorus Mulsant, 1842; Aphodius faldermani Sperk, 1835

Species of beetle

Bodilus lugens is a species of beetle of the family Scarabaeidae. It is found in Afghanistan, Algeria, Armenia, Austria, Azerbaijan, Belarus, Belgium, Bosnia and Herzegovina, Bulgaria, Croatia, Cyprus, the Czech Republic, Egypt, Estonia, France, Georgia, Germany, Greece, Hungary, Iran, Italy, Kazakhstan, Kyrgyzstan, Latvia, Lithuania, Malta, Macedonia, Morocco, the Netherlands, Poland, Portugal, Romania, Russia, Slovakia, Spain, Switzerland, Syria, Tajikistan, Tunisia, Turkey, Turkmenistan and Ukraine.

== Description ==
Adults reach a length of about 7–9 mm (0.28–0.35 in). They have an oblong-oval, moderately convex, shiny, glabrous body. The head is brown-reddish, the pronotum is dark brown-reddish with the sides testaceous. The elytra are testaceous, with the suture and lateral margins brownish and the abdomen is testaceous.
