= Bodilus hastatus =

Scientific classification
- Kingdom: Animalia
- Phylum: Arthropoda
- Clade: Pancrustacea
- Class: Insecta
- Order: Coleoptera
- Suborder: Polyphaga
- Infraorder: Scarabaeiformia
- Family: Scarabaeidae
- Genus: Bodilus
- Species: B. hastatus

Binomial name
- Bodilus hastatus (Reitter, 1892)

Synonyms
- Aphodius (Melinopterus) hastatus Reitter, 1892

Species of beetle

Bodilus hastatus is a species of beetle of the family Scarabaeidae. It is found in Turkmenistan and Uzbekistan.

== Description ==
Adults reach a length of about 7 mm (0.28 in). They have an oblong, convex, light yellowish-brown body. The head and pronotum are darker brown at the rear and in the middle and the elytra are finely pubescent at the apex.
