= Bodilus gregarius =

Scientific classification
- Kingdom: Animalia
- Phylum: Arthropoda
- Clade: Pancrustacea
- Class: Insecta
- Order: Coleoptera
- Suborder: Polyphaga
- Infraorder: Scarabaeiformia
- Family: Scarabaeidae
- Genus: Bodilus
- Species: B. gregarius

Binomial name
- Bodilus gregarius (Harold, 1871)

Synonyms
- Aphodius gregarius Harold, 1871; Aphodius (Cinacanthus) rudii stupidus Endrödi, 1969; Aphodius (Cinacanthus) rudii Endrödi, 1968; Aphodius (Melinopterus) kaeufeli Roubal, 1915; Aphodius lineatosetosus Benderitter, 1911; Aphodius maculicollis Ballion, 1871

Species of beetle

Bodilus gregarius is a species of beetle of the family Scarabaeidae. It is found in Azerbaijan, China (Xinjiang), Iran, Kazakhstan, Kyrgyzstan, Mongolia, Pakistan, Russia (including Siberia), Tajikistan, Turkmenistan, Ukraine and Uzbekistan.

== Description ==
Adults reach a length of about 7–8.5 mm (0.28–0.33 in). They have an oblong, moderately convex, fairly shiny, light to dark yellowish-red body. The head is darkened in the middle and toward the rear and the pronotum has a large, blackish-brown spot on the disc and a light-colored lateral margin. The edges of the scutellum and the sutural margin of the elytra are darkened. The underside is blackish-brown and the legs are light brown.
