= Bodilus barbarus =

Scientific classification
- Kingdom: Animalia
- Phylum: Arthropoda
- Clade: Pancrustacea
- Class: Insecta
- Order: Coleoptera
- Suborder: Polyphaga
- Infraorder: Scarabaeiformia
- Family: Scarabaeidae
- Genus: Bodilus
- Species: B. barbarus

Binomial name
- Bodilus barbarus (Fairmaire, 1860)

Synonyms
- Aphodius barbarus Fairmaire, 1860; Bodilus barbarus elytrisflavis Dellacasa & Dellacasa, 2005; Aphodius (Melaphodius) irritans Reitter, 1892

Species of beetle

Bodilus barbarus is a species of beetle of the family Scarabaeidae. It is found in Algeria, Morocco and Spain.

== Description ==
Adults reach a length of about 6–7 mm (0.24–0.28 in). They have a moderately convex, rather robust body. The anterior part of the body is glossy, while the elytra are duller, with very short hairs at the tips. The head, pronotum and scutellum are black, with the sides of the pronotum reddish-brown. The elytra range from light brown or reddish-brown to dark brown. The suture is darkened. The legs are brown.
