= Bodilus ardescens =

Scientific classification
- Kingdom: Animalia
- Phylum: Arthropoda
- Clade: Pancrustacea
- Class: Insecta
- Order: Coleoptera
- Suborder: Polyphaga
- Infraorder: Scarabaeiformia
- Family: Scarabaeidae
- Genus: Bodilus
- Species: B. ardescens

Binomial name
- Bodilus ardescens (Schmidt, 1917)

Synonyms
- Aphodius (Bodilus) ardescens Schmidt, 1917

Species of beetle

Bodilus ardescens is a species of beetle of the family Scarabaeidae. It is found in southern Pakistan.

== Description ==
Adults reach a length of about 5 mm (0.20 in). They have an elongate-oval, shiny, dark reddish-brown body, with the pronotum slightly lighter on the sides. The elytra are yellowish-brown with a darkened suture, lateral margins and apex.
