= Bodilus longeciliatus =

Scientific classification
- Kingdom: Animalia
- Phylum: Arthropoda
- Clade: Pancrustacea
- Class: Insecta
- Order: Coleoptera
- Suborder: Polyphaga
- Infraorder: Scarabaeiformia
- Family: Scarabaeidae
- Genus: Bodilus
- Species: B. longeciliatus

Binomial name
- Bodilus longeciliatus (Reitter, 1887)

Synonyms
- Aphodius longeciliatus Reitter, 1887

Species of beetle

Bodilus longeciliatus is a species of beetle of the family Scarabaeidae. It is found in China (Jiangsu, Nei Mongol, Xinjiang, Xizang), Iran, Kazakhstan, Mongolia and Russia.

== Description ==
Adults reach a length of about 6–7.5 mm (0.24–0.30 in). They have a moderately convex, glossy body. The sides and the apex of the elytra have fine, short hairs. They are yellowish-brown, with the back of the head, the disc of the pronotum, the scutellum and the sutural margin of the elytra dark brown.
