= Bodilus caspius =

Scientific classification
- Kingdom: Animalia
- Phylum: Arthropoda
- Clade: Pancrustacea
- Class: Insecta
- Order: Coleoptera
- Suborder: Polyphaga
- Infraorder: Scarabaeiformia
- Family: Scarabaeidae
- Genus: Bodilus
- Species: B. caspius

Binomial name
- Bodilus caspius (Ménétriés, 1832)

Synonyms
- Aphodius caspius Ménétriés, 1832

Species of beetle

Bodilus caspius is a species of beetle of the family Scarabaeidae. It is found in Armenia, Azerbaijan, Georgia, Iran, Kazakhstan, Kyrgyzstan, Moldova, Mongolia, Romania, Russia, Turkmenistan, Ukraine and Uzbekistan.

== Description ==
Adults reach a length of about 6–7.5 mm (0.24–0.30 in). They have a quite strongly convex, shiny body. The forebody is black, the pronotum sometimes faintly reddish in the middle of the lateral margins. The scutellum is dark and the elytra are yellowish-brown, with a darkened sutural margin and a diffuse spot. The legs are reddish-brown.
