= Bodilus kermanschahensis =

Scientific classification
- Kingdom: Animalia
- Phylum: Arthropoda
- Clade: Pancrustacea
- Class: Insecta
- Order: Coleoptera
- Suborder: Polyphaga
- Infraorder: Scarabaeiformia
- Family: Scarabaeidae
- Genus: Bodilus
- Species: B. kermanschahensis

Binomial name
- Bodilus kermanschahensis (Petrovitz, 1959)

Synonyms
- Aphodius (Cinacanthus) kermanschahensis Petrovitz, 1959

Species of beetle

Bodilus kermanschahensis is a species of beetle of the family Scarabaeidae. It is found in Iran.

== Description ==
Adults reach a length of about 7.5–8.8 mm (0.30–0.35 in). They have a broad, stout, glossy body, with the head and pronotum dark reddish-brown, both with lighter yellowish-brown sides. The scutellum is dark and the elytra are light reddish-brown with a darkened sutural margin and with the sides and apex covered with dust-like pubescence. The legs are reddish-brown.
