= Bodilus sordescens =

Scientific classification
- Kingdom: Animalia
- Phylum: Arthropoda
- Clade: Pancrustacea
- Class: Insecta
- Order: Coleoptera
- Suborder: Polyphaga
- Infraorder: Scarabaeiformia
- Family: Scarabaeidae
- Genus: Bodilus
- Species: B. sordescens

Binomial name
- Bodilus sordescens (Harold, 1869)

Synonyms
- Aphodius sordescens Harold, 1869; Aphodius (Melinopterus) delirus Balthasar, 1965; Aphodius (Melinopterus) pallididorsis Reitter, 1887

Species of beetle

Bodilus sordescens is a species of beetle of the family Scarabaeidae. It is found in China (Ningxia, Xinjiang, Xizang), Kazakhstan, Mongolia and Russia (including Siberia).

== Description ==
Adults reach a length of about 5.5–7 mm (0.22–0.28 in). They have a shiny, with the sides and in apical third of the elytra covered with fine, short hairs. They are reddish-yellow, with the posterior part of the head, a spot on the disc of the pronotum, the sides of the scutellum, and the sutural margin reddish-brown. The legs are yellowish-brown, with dark edges.
