= Bodilus furvus =

Scientific classification
- Kingdom: Animalia
- Phylum: Arthropoda
- Clade: Pancrustacea
- Class: Insecta
- Order: Coleoptera
- Suborder: Polyphaga
- Infraorder: Scarabaeiformia
- Family: Scarabaeidae
- Genus: Bodilus
- Species: B. furvus

Binomial name
- Bodilus furvus (Schmidt, 1917)

Synonyms
- Aphodius (Bodilus) furvus Schmidt, 1917; Aphodius (Pseudacrossus) rawalpindianus Balthasar, 1960

Species of beetle

Bodilus furvus is a species of beetle of the family Scarabaeidae. It is found in Nepal and Pakistan.

== Description ==
Adults reach a length of about 7–7.5 mm (0.28–0.30 in). They have a shiny, glabrous, brown body, with the sides of the head and, in most cases, the anterior angles of the pronotum with a faint, reddish translucency. The elytra are lighter brown, with a darkened suture and darkened lateral and apical margins.
