= Bodilus lunifer =

Scientific classification
- Kingdom: Animalia
- Phylum: Arthropoda
- Clade: Pancrustacea
- Class: Insecta
- Order: Coleoptera
- Suborder: Polyphaga
- Infraorder: Scarabaeiformia
- Family: Scarabaeidae
- Genus: Bodilus
- Species: B. lunifer

Binomial name
- Bodilus lunifer (Solsky, 1876)

Synonyms
- Aphodius lunifer Solsky, 1876; Lunaphodius lunifer

Species of beetle

Bodilus lunifer is a species of beetle of the family Scarabaeidae. It is found in Kazakhstan, Kyrgyzstan, Taijikistan, Turkmenistan and Uzbekistan.

== Description ==
Adults reach a length of about 6–8 mm (0.24–0.31 in). They have an elongate oval, moderately convex, shiny, nearly glabrous, blackish body. The pronotum is reddish at the sides and the elytra are yellowish with brownish suture and sometimes a darker discal spot. The legs and antennae are testaceous, the latter with a blackish club.
