= Bodilus edgardi =

Scientific classification
- Kingdom: Animalia
- Phylum: Arthropoda
- Clade: Pancrustacea
- Class: Insecta
- Order: Coleoptera
- Suborder: Polyphaga
- Infraorder: Scarabaeiformia
- Family: Scarabaeidae
- Genus: Bodilus
- Species: B. edgardi

Binomial name
- Bodilus edgardi (Solsky, 1876)

Synonyms
- Aphodius edgardi Solsky, 1876; Aphodius sartus Iablokoff-Khnzorian, 1971; Aphodius medvedevi Iablokoff-Khnzorian, 1970

Species of beetle

Bodilus edgardi is a species of beetle of the family Scarabaeidae. It is found in Afghanistan, Kazakhstan, Kyrgyzstan, Tajikistan and Turkmenistan.

== Description ==
Adults reach a length of about 5–7 mm (0.20–0.28 in). They have a rather flatly convex, glossy body. The tips of the elytra have some short hairs. The head, pronotum and scutellum are black, the pronotum sometimes with a reddish translucency in the middle of the lateral margin. The elytra are yellowish-red with a large spot. The legs are dark brown.
