= Bodilus veselyi =

Scientific classification
- Kingdom: Animalia
- Phylum: Arthropoda
- Clade: Pancrustacea
- Class: Insecta
- Order: Coleoptera
- Suborder: Polyphaga
- Infraorder: Scarabaeiformia
- Family: Scarabaeidae
- Genus: Bodilus
- Species: B. veselyi

Binomial name
- Bodilus veselyi (Tesař, 1969)

Synonyms
- Aphodius (Agrilinus) veselyi Tesař, 1969

Species of beetle

Bodilus veselyi is a species of beetle of the family Scarabaeidae. It is found in Pakistan.

== Description ==
Adults reach a length of about 6.5 mm (0.26 in). They have a blackish brown body, with the sides of the pronotum reddish and the apex of the elytra minutely setaceous.
