= Bodilus karrooensis =

Scientific classification
- Kingdom: Animalia
- Phylum: Arthropoda
- Clade: Pancrustacea
- Class: Insecta
- Order: Coleoptera
- Suborder: Polyphaga
- Infraorder: Scarabaeiformia
- Family: Scarabaeidae
- Genus: Bodilus
- Species: B. karrooensis

Binomial name
- Bodilus karrooensis (Endrödi, 1983)

Synonyms
- Aphodius (Bodilus) karrooensis Endrödi, 1983

Species of beetle

Bodilus karrooensis is a species of beetle of the family Scarabaeidae. It is found in South Africa (Cape).

== Description ==
Adults reach a length of about 7–8 mm (0.28–0.31 in). They have a shiny, reddish-brown body, with the vertex and disc of the pronotum darker.
