= Bodilus marani =

Scientific classification
- Kingdom: Animalia
- Phylum: Arthropoda
- Clade: Pancrustacea
- Class: Insecta
- Order: Coleoptera
- Suborder: Polyphaga
- Infraorder: Scarabaeiformia
- Family: Scarabaeidae
- Genus: Bodilus
- Species: B. marani

Binomial name
- Bodilus marani (Balthasar, 1929)

Synonyms
- Aphodius marani Balthasar, 1929

Species of beetle

Bodilus marani is a species of beetle of the family Scarabaeidae. It is found in Tunisia.

== Description ==
Adults reach a length of about 7 mm (0.28 in). They have a moderately convex, glossy, blackish-brown body. The head is reddish on the sides, and the pronotum is yellowish-red on the sides. The scutellum is dark. The elytra are yellowish-brown with a darkened suture and with the lateral margins covered with tiny hairs toward the rear. The legs are reddish-brown.
