= Plagiogonus farai =

Scientific classification
- Kingdom: Animalia
- Phylum: Arthropoda
- Clade: Pancrustacea
- Class: Insecta
- Order: Coleoptera
- Suborder: Polyphaga
- Infraorder: Scarabaeiformia
- Family: Scarabaeidae
- Genus: Plagiogonus
- Species: P. farai

Binomial name
- Plagiogonus farai (Balthasar, 1955)

Synonyms
- Aphodius (Plagiogonus) farai Balthasar, 1955

Species of beetle

Plagiogonus farai is a species of beetle of the family Scarabaeidae. It is found in Afghanistan, Iran and Pakistan.

== Description ==
Adults reach a length of about 3.5 mm (0.14 in). They have a strongly convex, glossy, blackish-brown body. The anterior part of the head is translucent light red and the legs are yellowish-brown.
