= Plagiogonus esimoides =

Scientific classification
- Kingdom: Animalia
- Phylum: Arthropoda
- Clade: Pancrustacea
- Class: Insecta
- Order: Coleoptera
- Suborder: Polyphaga
- Infraorder: Scarabaeiformia
- Family: Scarabaeidae
- Genus: Plagiogonus
- Species: P. esimoides

Binomial name
- Plagiogonus esimoides (Reitter, 1892)

Synonyms
- Aphodius (Plagiogonus) esimoides Reitter, 1892

Species of beetle

Plagiogonus esimoides is a species of beetle of the family Scarabaeidae. It is found in Algeria, Libya, Morocco and Tunisia.

== Description ==
Adults reach a length of about 2.5–2.8 mm (0.098–0.110 in). They have an oblong-oval, moderately convex, mostly shiny body. The head and pronotum are blackish-grey, while the elytra are yellowish-brown, with the sutural area and usually also the base, sides and apex darkened.
