= Plagiogonus shirahatai =

Scientific classification
- Kingdom: Animalia
- Phylum: Arthropoda
- Clade: Pancrustacea
- Class: Insecta
- Order: Coleoptera
- Suborder: Polyphaga
- Infraorder: Scarabaeiformia
- Family: Scarabaeidae
- Genus: Plagiogonus
- Species: P. shirahatai

Binomial name
- Plagiogonus shirahatai (Nakane, 1951)

Synonyms
- Aphodius (Plagiogonus) shirahatai Nakane, 1951

Species of beetle

Plagiogonus shirahatai is a species of beetle of the family Scarabaeidae. It is found in China (Shaanxi, Shanxi).

== Description ==
Adults reach a length of about 3.3 mm (0.13 in). They have a moderately convex, glossy, blackish-brown body, with the anterior margin of the head, the sides of the pronotum and the sides and apical portion of the elytra reddish-brown. The legs are reddish.
