= Plagiogonus duporti =

Scientific classification
- Kingdom: Animalia
- Phylum: Arthropoda
- Clade: Pancrustacea
- Class: Insecta
- Order: Coleoptera
- Suborder: Polyphaga
- Infraorder: Scarabaeiformia
- Family: Scarabaeidae
- Genus: Plagiogonus
- Species: P. duporti

Binomial name
- Plagiogonus duporti Paulian, 1945

Species of beetle

Plagiogonus duporti is a species of beetle of the family Scarabaeidae. It is found in Thailand and Vietnam.

== Description ==
Adults reach a length of about 2.5 mm (0.098 in). They have a rather elongate, glossy, blackish-brown body, with the sides of the head and the pronotum lighter. The elytra are brown, with a blackened suture and blackish sides.
