= Plagiogonus burgaltaicus =

Scientific classification
- Kingdom: Animalia
- Phylum: Arthropoda
- Clade: Pancrustacea
- Class: Insecta
- Order: Coleoptera
- Suborder: Polyphaga
- Infraorder: Scarabaeiformia
- Family: Scarabaeidae
- Genus: Plagiogonus
- Species: P. burgaltaicus

Binomial name
- Plagiogonus burgaltaicus (Csiki, 1901)

Synonyms
- Aphodius (Mendidius) burgaltaicus Csiki, 1901

Species of beetle

Plagiogonus burgaltaicus is a species of beetle of the family Scarabaeidae. It is found in China (Nei Mongol), Mongolia and the Russian Far East.

== Description ==
Adults reach a length of about 3 mm (0.12 in). They have a convex, shiny, blackish-brown body, with the sides of the pronotum lighter. The elytra are pale yellow with a dark suture. The scutellum is dark and the legs light reddish-brown.
