= Plagiogonus nanus =

Scientific classification
- Kingdom: Animalia
- Phylum: Arthropoda
- Clade: Pancrustacea
- Class: Insecta
- Order: Coleoptera
- Suborder: Polyphaga
- Infraorder: Scarabaeiformia
- Family: Scarabaeidae
- Genus: Plagiogonus
- Species: P. nanus

Binomial name
- Plagiogonus nanus (Fairmaire, 1860)

Synonyms
- Aphodius nanus Fairmaire, 1860; Plagiogonus theryi Clouët, 1896; Plagiogonus algiricus Harold, 1863

Species of beetle

Plagiogonus nanus is a species of beetle of the family Scarabaeidae. It is found in Algeria, Egypt, Libya, Morocco, Spain, Tunisia and Turkey.

== Description ==
Adults reach a length of about 2.5–3.5 mm (0.098–0.138 in). They have a short, strongly convex, glossy, blackish-brown body, with the anterior margin of the head and the lateral margins of the pronotum lighter. The elytra are lighter brown.
