= Plagiogonus nanoides =

Scientific classification
- Kingdom: Animalia
- Phylum: Arthropoda
- Clade: Pancrustacea
- Class: Insecta
- Order: Coleoptera
- Suborder: Polyphaga
- Infraorder: Scarabaeiformia
- Family: Scarabaeidae
- Genus: Plagiogonus
- Species: P. nanoides

Binomial name
- Plagiogonus nanoides (Balthasar, 1961)

Synonyms
- Aphodius (Plagiogonus) nanoides Balthasar, 1961

Species of beetle

Plagiogonus nanoides is a species of beetle of the family Scarabaeidae. It is found in Turkey.

== Description ==
Adults reach a length of about 3.5–3.7 mm (0.14–0.15 in). They have a strongly convex, highly lustrous, blackish-brown body, with the apical portion of the elytra reddish-brown.
