= Plagiogonus =

Scientific classification
- Kingdom: Animalia
- Phylum: Arthropoda
- Clade: Pancrustacea
- Class: Insecta
- Order: Coleoptera
- Suborder: Polyphaga
- Infraorder: Scarabaeiformia
- Family: Scarabaeidae
- Subfamily: Aphodiinae
- Tribe: Aphodiini
- Genus: Plagiogonus; Mulsant, 1842

Synonyms
- Aphodius (Eccoptaphodius) Iablokoff-Khnzorian, 1964; Oloperus Mulsant & Rey, 1870

Genus of beetles

Plagiogonus is a genus of beetles of the family Scarabaeidae.

== Species ==
- Plagiogonus arenarius (Olivier, 1789)
- Plagiogonus bortkevitschi (Koshantschikov, 1916)
- Plagiogonus burgaltaicus (Csiki, 1901)
- Plagiogonus chan (Endrödi, 1967)
- Plagiogonus clypeodentatus (Bordat, 1990)
- Plagiogonus critchlowi Bordat, 2005
- Plagiogonus culminarius (Reitter, 1900)
- Plagiogonus duporti Paulian, 1945
- Plagiogonus esimoides (Reitter, 1892)
- Plagiogonus farai (Balthasar, 1955)
- Plagiogonus hielkemai Bellmann, 2023
- Plagiogonus hirticeps (Péringuey, 1901)
- Plagiogonus huainamdang (Masumoto, Kiuchi & Higurashi, 2025)
- Plagiogonus inflatus (Balthasar, 1938)
- Plagiogonus khaoensis (Stebnicka, 1988)
- Plagiogonus krataay (Masumoto, 1992)
- Plagiogonus martensi (Stebnicka, 1986)
- Plagiogonus nanoides (Balthasar, 1961)
- Plagiogonus nanus (Fairmaire, 1860)
- Plagiogonus oberthueri (Paulian, 1936)
- Plagiogonus palea (Balthasar, 1967)
- Plagiogonus phuhimrongkla (Masumoto, Kiuchi & Higurashi, 2025)
- Plagiogonus praeustus (Ballion, 1871)
- Plagiogonus quadriclypealis (Červenka, 1995)
- Plagiogonus ramamiensis (Stebnicka, 1982)
- Plagiogonus reitteri (Koshantschikov, 1894)
- Plagiogonus separatus (Petrovitz, 1962)
- Plagiogonus sextus Bordat, 2019
- Plagiogonus shirahatai (Nakane, 1951)
- Plagiogonus syriacus Harold, 1863
- Plagiogonus tertius (Bordat, 1992)
- Plagiogonus zobeidae (Petrovitz, 1980)
