= Plagiogonus praeustus =

Scientific classification
- Kingdom: Animalia
- Phylum: Arthropoda
- Clade: Pancrustacea
- Class: Insecta
- Order: Coleoptera
- Suborder: Polyphaga
- Infraorder: Scarabaeiformia
- Family: Scarabaeidae
- Genus: Plagiogonus
- Species: P. praeustus

Binomial name
- Plagiogonus praeustus (Ballion, 1871)

Synonyms
- Aphodius praeustus Ballion, 1871

Species of beetle

Plagiogonus praeustus is a species of beetle of the family Scarabaeidae. It is found in Afghanistan, Azerbaijan, Cyprus, Israel, Kazakhstan, Kyrgyzstan, Russia, Syria, Tajikistan, Turkmenistan and Uzbekistan.

== Description ==
Adults reach a length of about 2.7–3.2 mm (0.11–0.13 in). They have an elongate-oval, moderately convex, highly glossy, black to blackish-brown body, with the anterior angles of the pronotum sometimes dark reddish-brown. The elytra are yellowish-brown, with the sutural margin darkened.
