= Plagiogonus reitteri =

Scientific classification
- Kingdom: Animalia
- Phylum: Arthropoda
- Clade: Pancrustacea
- Class: Insecta
- Order: Coleoptera
- Suborder: Polyphaga
- Infraorder: Scarabaeiformia
- Family: Scarabaeidae
- Genus: Plagiogonus
- Species: P. reitteri

Binomial name
- Plagiogonus reitteri (Koshantschikov, 1894)

Synonyms
- Aphodius (Plagiogonus) reitteri Koshantschikov, 1894; Aphodius (Plagiogonus) kricheldorffi Koshantschikov, 1910

Species of beetle

Plagiogonus reitteri is a species of beetle of the family Scarabaeidae. It is found in Kazakhstan and Kyrgyzstan.

== Description ==
Adults reach a length of about 3.5–4.2 mm (0.14–0.17 in). The head is brown and the pronotum is shiny and brown with paler sides. The scutellum is brown with darker lateral margins and the elytra are glabrous, shiny, and yellow with brown suture and pale brown apices.
