= Plagiogonus oberthueri =

Scientific classification
- Kingdom: Animalia
- Phylum: Arthropoda
- Clade: Pancrustacea
- Class: Insecta
- Order: Coleoptera
- Suborder: Polyphaga
- Infraorder: Scarabaeiformia
- Family: Scarabaeidae
- Genus: Plagiogonus
- Species: P. oberthueri

Binomial name
- Plagiogonus oberthueri (Paulian, 1936)

Synonyms
- Aphodius (Plagiogonus) oberthueri Paulian, 1936; Aphodius (Plagiogonus) oberthueri nigrescens Paulian, 1936; Aphodius (Plagiogonus) oberthueri rubricatus Paulian, 1936

Species of beetle

Plagiogonus oberthueri is a species of beetle of the family Scarabaeidae. It is found in Bangladesh.

== Description ==
Adults reach a length of about 2.8–3.5 mm (0.11–0.14 in). They have a rather convex, oblong-oval, glossy, blackish-brown body. The anterior margin of the head is lighter, and each elytron has a large, reddish-brown patch at the base.
