= Plagiogonus inflatus =

Scientific classification
- Kingdom: Animalia
- Phylum: Arthropoda
- Clade: Pancrustacea
- Class: Insecta
- Order: Coleoptera
- Suborder: Polyphaga
- Infraorder: Scarabaeiformia
- Family: Scarabaeidae
- Genus: Plagiogonus
- Species: P. inflatus

Binomial name
- Plagiogonus inflatus (Balthasar, 1938)

Synonyms
- Aphodius (Plagiogonus) inflatus Balthasar, 1938; Plagiogonus tesarianus Paulian, 1942

Species of beetle

Plagiogonus inflatus is a species of beetle of the family Scarabaeidae. It is found in China (Sichuan, Xinjiang).

== Description ==
Adults reach a length of about 2.5–3 mm (0.098–0.118 in). They have a strongly convex, glossy body. The head and pronotum are brownish-black, with the sides lighter. The elytra are brown, with the shoulders and the apical portion lighter. The legs are brown.
