= Plagiogonus bortkevitschi =

Scientific classification
- Kingdom: Animalia
- Phylum: Arthropoda
- Clade: Pancrustacea
- Class: Insecta
- Order: Coleoptera
- Suborder: Polyphaga
- Infraorder: Scarabaeiformia
- Family: Scarabaeidae
- Genus: Plagiogonus
- Species: P. bortkevitschi

Binomial name
- Plagiogonus bortkevitschi (Koshantschikov, 1916)

Synonyms
- Aphodius (Plagiogonus) bortkevitschi Koshantschikov, 1916; Aphodius (Orodalus) gurjevae Nikolajev, 1984

Species of beetle

Plagiogonus bortkevitschi is a species of beetle of the family Scarabaeidae. It is found in China (Jilin), Mongolia and Siberia.

== Description ==
Adults reach a length of about 2.7 mm (0.11 in). They have a rather weakly convex, oblong, moderately shiny, black body, with the anterior angles of the pronotum, the elytra and the legs reddish-brown, the latter with a dark sutural interval.
