= Plagiogonus culminarius =

Scientific classification
- Kingdom: Animalia
- Phylum: Arthropoda
- Clade: Pancrustacea
- Class: Insecta
- Order: Coleoptera
- Suborder: Polyphaga
- Infraorder: Scarabaeiformia
- Family: Scarabaeidae
- Genus: Plagiogonus
- Species: P. culminarius

Binomial name
- Plagiogonus culminarius (Reitter, 1900)

Synonyms
- Aphodius (Plagiogonus) culminarius Reitter, 1900

Species of beetle

Plagiogonus culminarius is a species of beetle of the family Scarabaeidae. It is found in China (Beijing, Gansu, Guangdong, Liaoning, Xinjiang, Xizang, Zhejiang), Korea, Kyrgyzstan, Mongolia, the Russian Far East and Turkmenistan.

== Description ==
Adults reach a length of about 2–4 mm (0.079–0.157 in). They have a shiny yellowish brown body with a blackish-brown to black head, scutellum and medial part of the pronotum.

== Life history ==
Specimens have been collected from cow dung.
