= Plagiogonus syriacus =

Scientific classification
- Kingdom: Animalia
- Phylum: Arthropoda
- Clade: Pancrustacea
- Class: Insecta
- Order: Coleoptera
- Suborder: Polyphaga
- Infraorder: Scarabaeiformia
- Family: Scarabaeidae
- Genus: Plagiogonus
- Species: P. syriacus

Binomial name
- Plagiogonus syriacus Harold, 1863

Species of beetle

Plagiogonus syriacus is a species of beetle of the family Scarabaeidae. It is found in Armenia, Azerbaijan, Georgia, Israel, Lebanon, Russia, Syria and Turkey.

== Description ==
Adults reach a length of about 3.5–4 mm (0.14–0.16 in). They have a strongly convex, glossy, mostly glabrous, blackish-brown body, with the elytra becoming lighter reddish-brown toward the tips. The elytra also have dark stripes.
