= Plagiogonus arenarius =

Scientific classification
- Kingdom: Animalia
- Phylum: Arthropoda
- Clade: Pancrustacea
- Class: Insecta
- Order: Coleoptera
- Suborder: Polyphaga
- Infraorder: Scarabaeiformia
- Family: Scarabaeidae
- Genus: Plagiogonus
- Species: P. arenarius

Binomial name
- Plagiogonus arenarius (Olivier, 1789)

Synonyms
- Scarabaeus arenarius Olivier, 1789; Aphodius (Eccoptaphodius) avetissiani Iablokov-Khnzoryan, 196; Ammoecius nitidus Küster, 1849; Scarabaeus putridus Geoffroy, 1785; Scarabaeus rhododactylus Marsham, 1802; Plagiogonus arenarius sabulicola Mulsant, 1842; Scarabaeus pusillus Preyssler, 1790

Species of beetle

Plagiogonus arenarius is a species of beetle of the family Scarabaeidae. It is found in Armenia, Austria, Belarus, Belgium, Bosnia and Herzegovina, Croatia, Cyprus, the Czech Republic, Denmark, Estonia, Finland, France, Georgia, Germany, Great Britain, Greece, Hungary, Italy, Kazakhstan, Latvia, Lithuania, Luxembourg, Moldova, Montenegro, the Netherlands, Poland, Romania, Russia, Serbia, Siberia, Slovakia, Slovenia, Spain, Sweden, Switzerland, Turkey, Turkmenistan and Ukraine.

== Description ==
Adults reach a length of about 2.5–4 mm (0.098–0.157 in). They have an obovate, convex, shiny, glabrous, piceous body. The elytra are chestnut-brown, but paler apically. Sometimes, they are piceous-reddish, with the elytra pale reddish.
