= Amidorus cribricollis =

Scientific classification
- Kingdom: Animalia
- Phylum: Arthropoda
- Clade: Pancrustacea
- Class: Insecta
- Order: Coleoptera
- Suborder: Polyphaga
- Infraorder: Scarabaeiformia
- Family: Scarabaeidae
- Genus: Amidorus
- Species: A. cribricollis

Binomial name
- Amidorus cribricollis (Lucas, 1846)

Synonyms
- Aphodius cribricollis Lucas, 1846; Aphodius (Amidorus) oranicus Balthasar, 1961; Aphodius (Amidorus) cribricollis barbaroides Schmidt, 1910; Aphodius barbarus Reitter, 1897

Species of beetle

Amidorus cribricollis is a species of beetle of the family Scarabaeidae. It is found in Algeria, Morocco, Spain and Tunisia.

== Description ==
Adults reach a length of about 6–8 mm (0.24–0.31 in). They have an oval, rather convex, somewhat elongate, black body. The elytra are yellowish-brown to dark yellowish-brown and nearly glabrous. The legs are reddish-brown.
