= Amidorus cribrarius =

Scientific classification
- Kingdom: Animalia
- Phylum: Arthropoda
- Clade: Pancrustacea
- Class: Insecta
- Order: Coleoptera
- Suborder: Polyphaga
- Infraorder: Scarabaeiformia
- Family: Scarabaeidae
- Genus: Amidorus
- Species: A. cribrarius

Binomial name
- Amidorus cribrarius (Brullé, 1832)

Synonyms
- Aphodius cribrarius Brullé, 1832; Aphodius (Amidorus) tarsensis Petrovitz, 1967; Aphodius (Amidorus) cribarius purpuripennis Reitter, 1892; Aphodius dalmatinus Schmidt, 1840; Aphodius punctatissimus Dejean, 1833

Species of beetle

Amidorus cribrarius is a species of beetle of the family Scarabaeidae. It is found in Albania, Armenia, Bosnia Herzegovina, Bulgaria, Croatia, Cyprus, Georgia, Greece, Macedonia, Syria, Turkey and Turkmenistan.

== Description ==
Adults reach a length of about 6–8 mm (0.24–0.31 in). They have an oval, rather convex, somewhat elongate, black body. The elytra are red to dark red and nearly glabrous. The legs are slightly reddish.
