= Amidorus salebrosus =

Scientific classification
- Kingdom: Animalia
- Phylum: Arthropoda
- Clade: Pancrustacea
- Class: Insecta
- Order: Coleoptera
- Suborder: Polyphaga
- Infraorder: Scarabaeiformia
- Family: Scarabaeidae
- Genus: Amidorus
- Species: A. salebrosus

Binomial name
- Amidorus salebrosus (Schmidt, 1910)

Synonyms
- Aphodius salebrosus Schmidt, 1910

Species of beetle

Amidorus salebrosus is a species of beetle of the family Scarabaeidae. It is found in Zimbabwe.

== Description ==
Adults reach a length of about 3 mm (0.12 in). They have a slightly glossy, hairy, oblong, and only slightly convex body. The upper and lower surfaces are uniformly light reddish-brown.
