= Amidorus thermicola =

Scientific classification
- Kingdom: Animalia
- Phylum: Arthropoda
- Clade: Pancrustacea
- Class: Insecta
- Order: Coleoptera
- Suborder: Polyphaga
- Infraorder: Scarabaeiformia
- Family: Scarabaeidae
- Genus: Amidorus
- Species: A. thermicola

Binomial name
- Amidorus thermicola (Sturm, 1800)

Synonyms
- Aphodius thermicola Sturm, 1800; Aphodius (Amidorus) thermicola ovium Roubal, 1936; Aphodius obscurus meridionalis Mulsant, 1842

Species of beetle

Amidorus thermicola is a species of beetle of the family Scarabaeidae. It is found in Armenia, Austria, Bosnia Herzegovina, Bulgaria, Croatia, Cyprus, the Czech Republic, France, Georgia, Greece, Hungary, Italy, Macedonia, Poland, Romania, Russia, Slovakia, Slovenia, Spain, Syria, Turkey, Turkmenistan and Ukraine.

== Description ==
Adults reach a length of about 7–8 mm (0.28–0.31 in). They have an oval, rather convex, elongate, black, reddish or dark reddish body. The elytra are pubescent and the legs are slightly reddish.
