= Amidorus moraguesi =

Scientific classification
- Kingdom: Animalia
- Phylum: Arthropoda
- Clade: Pancrustacea
- Class: Insecta
- Order: Coleoptera
- Suborder: Polyphaga
- Infraorder: Scarabaeiformia
- Family: Scarabaeidae
- Genus: Amidorus
- Species: A. moraguesi

Binomial name
- Amidorus moraguesi (Baraud, 1978)

Synonyms
- Aphodius (Amidorus) moraguesi Baraud, 1978

Species of beetle

Amidorus moraguesi is a species of beetle of the family Scarabaeidae. It is found in Morocco.

== Description ==
Adults reach a length of about 7–8 mm (0.28–0.31 in). They have an oval, rather convex, somewhat elongate, black body. The elytra are black to dark reddish-brown and nearly glabrous. The legs are sometimes reddish.
