= Amidorus alagoezi =

Scientific classification
- Kingdom: Animalia
- Phylum: Arthropoda
- Clade: Pancrustacea
- Class: Insecta
- Order: Coleoptera
- Suborder: Polyphaga
- Infraorder: Scarabaeiformia
- Family: Scarabaeidae
- Genus: Amidorus
- Species: A. alagoezi

Binomial name
- Amidorus alagoezi (Olsoufieff, 1918)

Synonyms
- Aphodius (Amidorus) alagoezi Olsoufieff, 1918; Aphodius (Amidorus) rollandi Kalashian & Lumaret, 2000; Aphodius (Amidorus) monticustos Balthasar, 1946

Species of beetle

Amidorus alagoezi is a species of beetle of the family Scarabaeidae. It is found in Armenia and Russia.

== Description ==
Adults reach a length of about 6–8 mm (0.24–0.31 in). They have an oval, rather convex, somewhat elongate, nearly glabrous, black body. The elytra are black to black-reddish and the legs are slightly reddish.
