= Amidorus =

Scientific classification
- Kingdom: Animalia
- Phylum: Arthropoda
- Clade: Pancrustacea
- Class: Insecta
- Order: Coleoptera
- Suborder: Polyphaga
- Infraorder: Scarabaeiformia
- Family: Scarabaeidae
- Subfamily: Aphodiinae
- Tribe: Aphodiini
- Genus: Amidorus; Mulsant & Rey, 1870

Genus of beetles

Amidorus is a genus of beetles of the family Scarabaeidae.

== Species ==
- Amidorus alagoezi (Olsoufieff, 1918)
- Amidorus cribrarius (Brullé, 1832)
- Amidorus cribricollis (Lucas, 1846)
- Amidorus dentellus (Schmidt, 1908)
- Amidorus granulatus (Boheman, 1857)
- Amidorus immaturus (Mulsant, 1842)
- Amidorus koshantschikovi (Jacobson, 1911)
- Amidorus moraguesi (Baraud, 1978)
- Amidorus obscurus (Fabricius, 1792)
- Amidorus salebrosus (Schmidt, 1910)
- Amidorus thermicola (Sturm, 1800)
