= Amidorus koshantschikovi =

Scientific classification
- Kingdom: Animalia
- Phylum: Arthropoda
- Clade: Pancrustacea
- Class: Insecta
- Order: Coleoptera
- Suborder: Polyphaga
- Infraorder: Scarabaeiformia
- Family: Scarabaeidae
- Genus: Amidorus
- Species: A. koshantschikovi

Binomial name
- Amidorus koshantschikovi (Jacobson, 1911)

Synonyms
- Aphodius koshantschikovi Jacobson, 1911; Aphodius (Amidorus) koshanschikovi rubens Olsoufieff, 1918; Aphodius (Amidorus) atratellus Schmidt, 1917; Aphodius fimicola Reiche & Saulcy, 1856

Species of beetle

Amidorus koshantschikovi is a species of beetle of the family Scarabaeidae. It is found in Cyprus, Greece and Syria.

== Description ==
Adults reach a length of about 5–6 mm (0.20–0.24 in). They have an oval, rather convex, black body. The elytra are black to brownish-black and nearly glabrous. The legs are sometimes slightly reddish.
