= Amidorus immaturus =

Scientific classification
- Kingdom: Animalia
- Phylum: Arthropoda
- Clade: Pancrustacea
- Class: Insecta
- Order: Coleoptera
- Suborder: Polyphaga
- Infraorder: Scarabaeiformia
- Family: Scarabaeidae
- Genus: Amidorus
- Species: A. immaturus

Binomial name
- Amidorus immaturus (Mulsant, 1842)

Synonyms
- Aphodius sericatus immaturus Mulsant, 1842; Aphodius (Amidorus) germandi Nicolas & Riboulet, 1967

Species of beetle

Amidorus immaturus is a species of beetle of the family Scarabaeidae. It is found in France and Italy.

== Description ==
Adults reach a length of about 6–8 mm (0.24–0.31 in). They have an oval, rather convex, somewhat elongate, nearly glabrous, black body. The elytra are black to black-brown and the legs are slightly reddish.
