= Amidorus obscurus =

Scientific classification
- Kingdom: Animalia
- Phylum: Arthropoda
- Clade: Pancrustacea
- Class: Insecta
- Order: Coleoptera
- Suborder: Polyphaga
- Infraorder: Scarabaeiformia
- Family: Scarabaeidae
- Genus: Amidorus
- Species: A. obscurus

Binomial name
- Amidorus obscurus (Fabricius, 1792)

Synonyms
- Scarabaeus obscurus Fabricius, 1792; Aphodius kluchoris Roubal, 1918; Aphodius obscurus purpureus Schmidt, 1917; Aphodius (Amidorus) obscurus dichrous Reitter, 1892; Aphodius flavipennis Miller, 1883; Aphodius hyleus Gistel, 1857; Aphodius sericatus Schmidt, 1840; Aphodius asiaticus Faldermann, 1836; Aphodius bubulcus Faldermann, 1836; Aphodius (Amidorus) obscurus latinus Dellacasa, 1983

Species of beetle

Amidorus obscurus is a species of beetle of the family Scarabaeidae. It is found in the Palearctic region.

== Description ==
Adults reach a length of about 6–8 mm (0.24–0.31 in). They have an oblong-oval, moderately convex, rather dull, nearly glabrous, blackish body, sometimes with the elytra reddish or in exceptional cases yellowish.

== Subspecies ==
- Amidorus obscurus obscurus (Albania, Andorra, Armenia, Austria, Azerbaijan, Bosnia Herzegovina, Bulgaria, Croatia, France, Georgia, Germany, Greece: Crete, Iran, Italy, Latvia, Macedonia, Montenegro, Poland, Romania, Russia, Serbia, Slovenia, Spain, Switzerland, Turkey, Ukraine)
- Amidorus obscurus latinus (Dellacasa, 1983) (Italy: Appennino Centrale)
