= List of Canadian damselflies =

This is a list of damselflies (Odonata) of Canada.

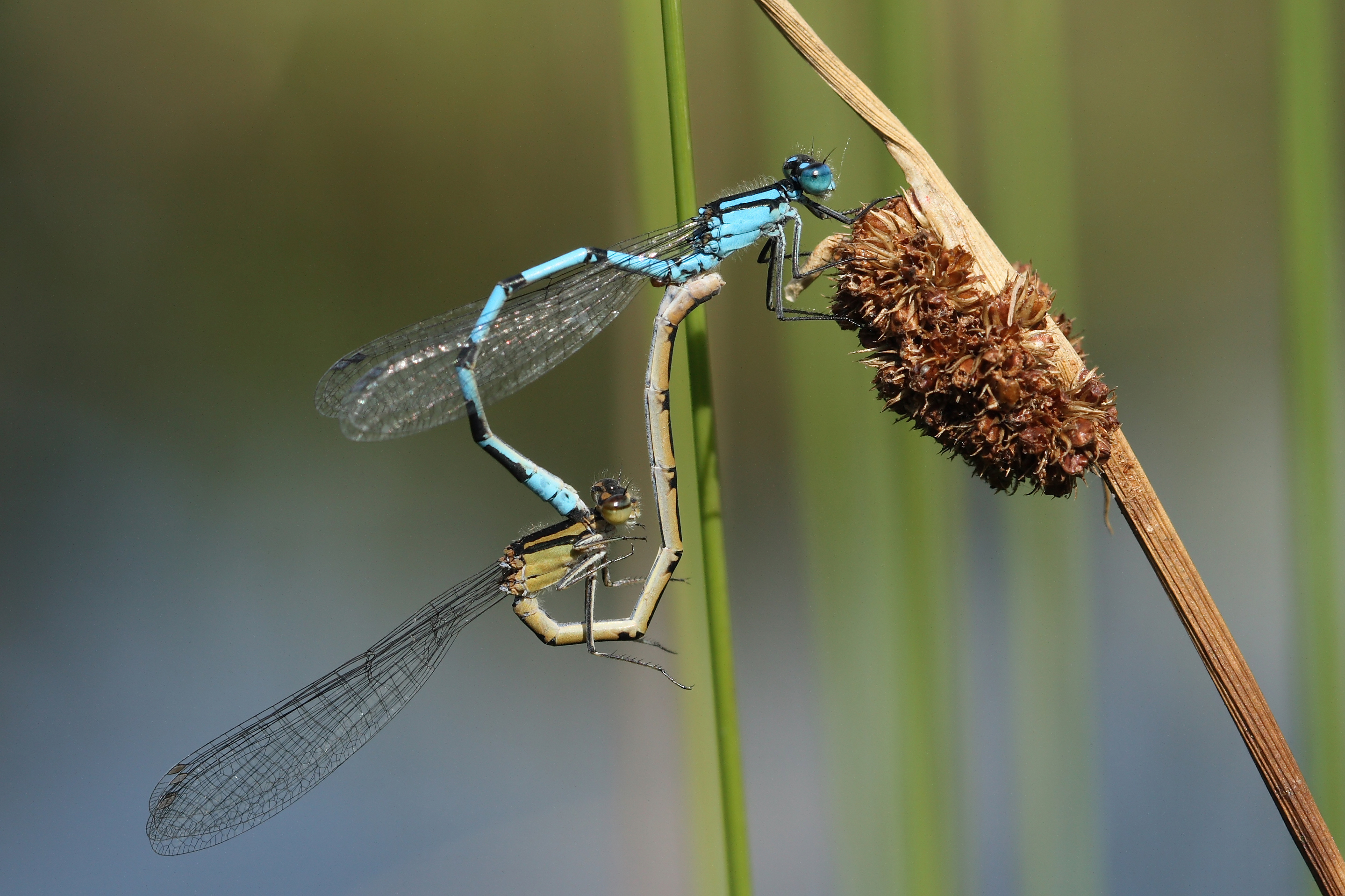
Northern bluets in mating wheel (Enallagma cyathigerum)

== Family Calopterygidae, broad-winged damsels ==
=== Genus Calopteryx, jewelwings ===
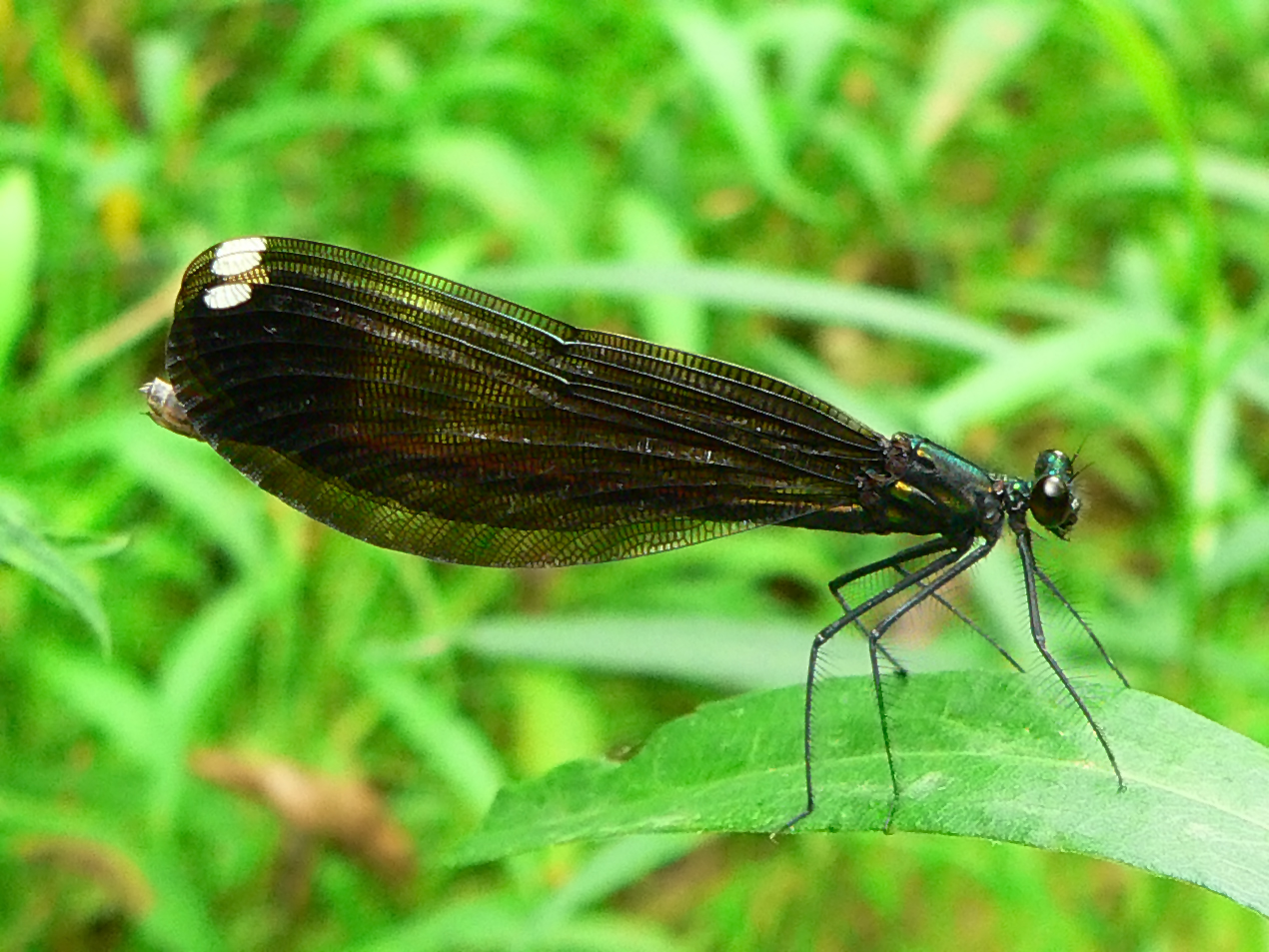
Ebony jewelwing (Calopteryx maculata)

- Calopteryx aequabilis, river jewelwing
- Calopteryx amata, superb jewelwing
- Calopteryx dimidiata, sparkling jewelwing
- Calopteryx maculata, ebony jewelwing

=== Genus Hetaerina, rubyspots ===
- Hetaerina americana, American rubyspot

== Family Lestidae, spreadwings ==
=== Genus Archilestes ===
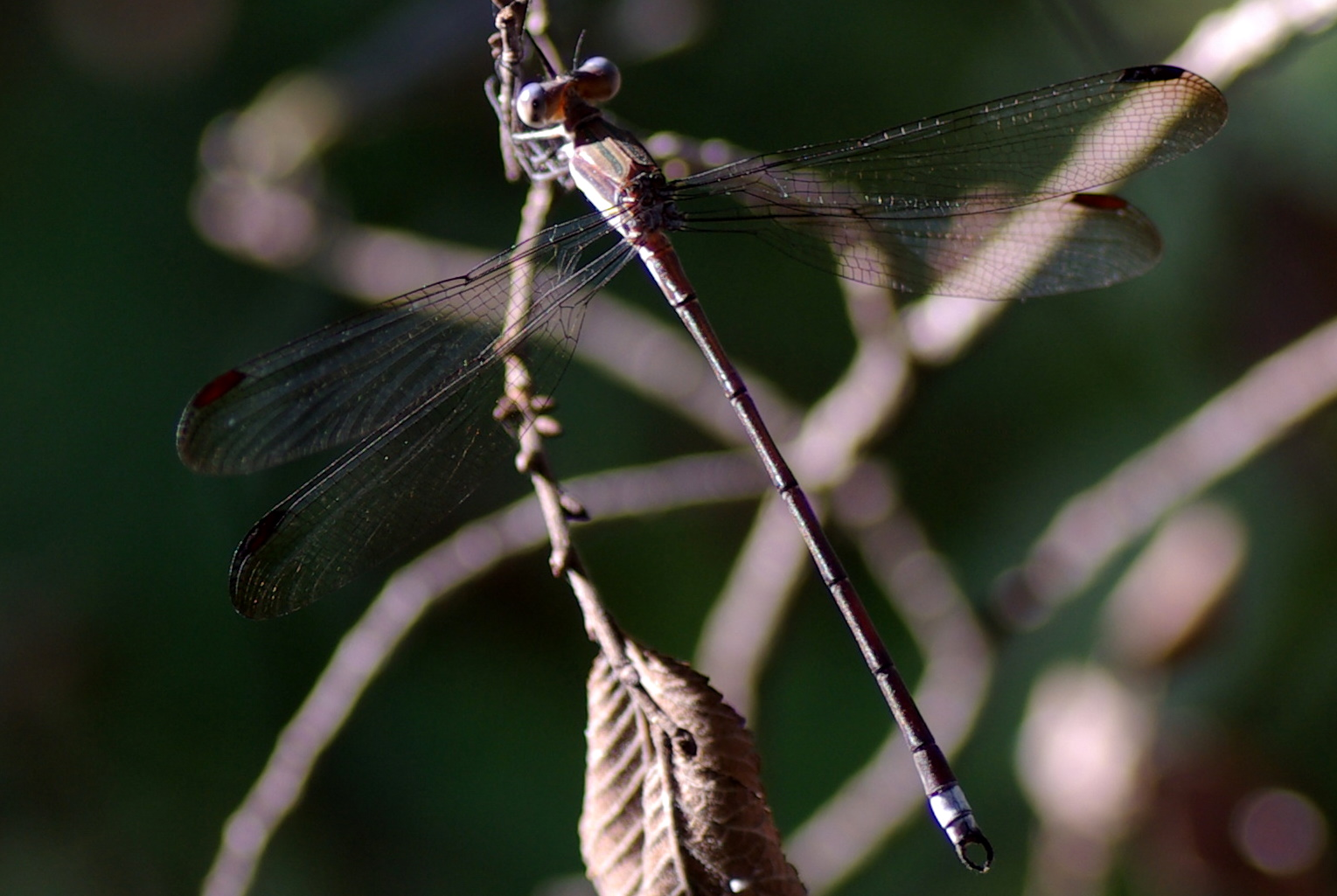
Great spreadwing

- Archilestes grandis, great spreadwing

=== Genus Lestes ===
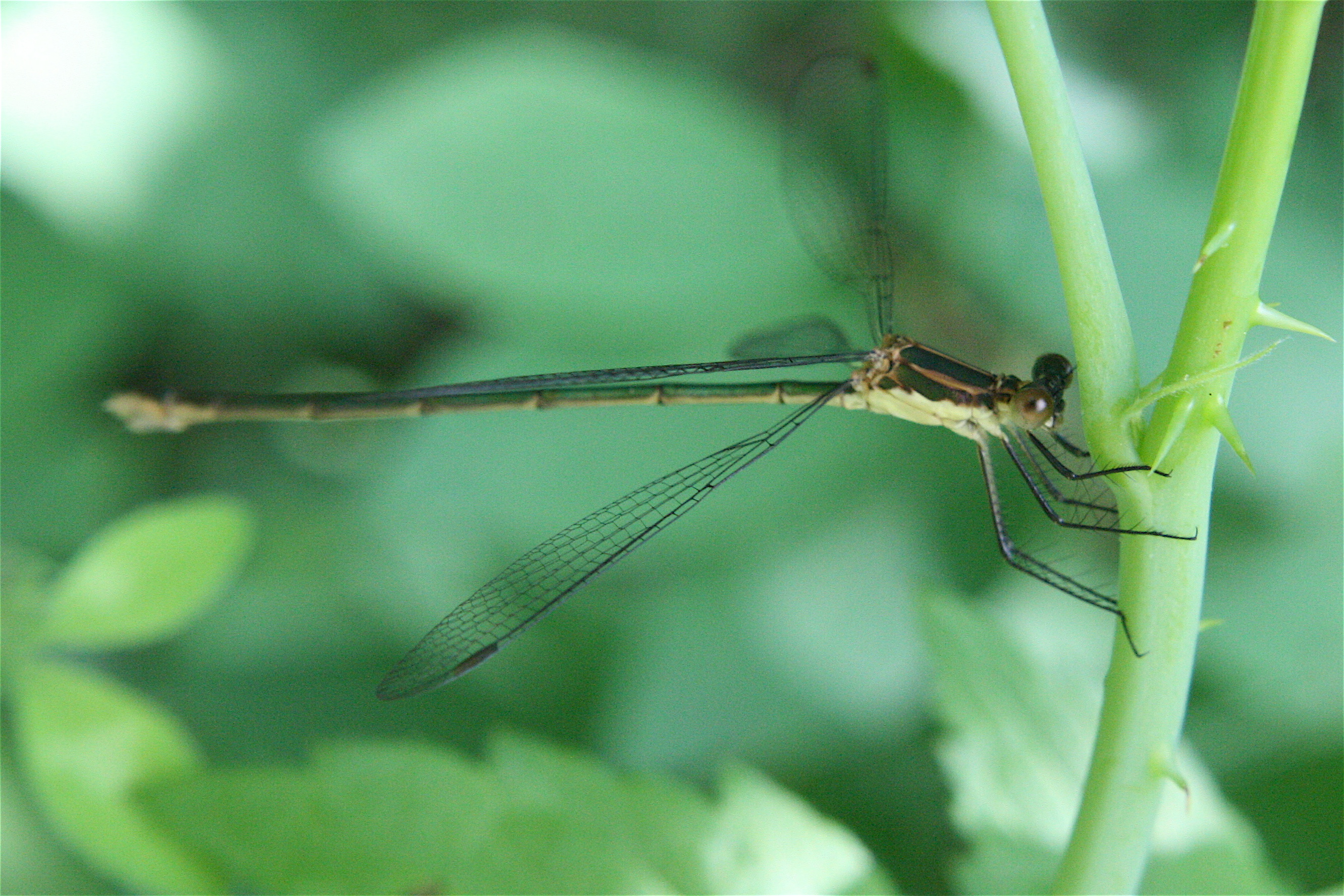
Swamp spreadwing (Lestes vigilax)

- Lestes australis, southern spreadwing
- Lestes congener, spotted spreadwing
- Lestes disjunctus, common spreadwing or northern spreadwing
- Lestes dryas, emerald spreadwing
- Lestes eurinus, amber-winged spreadwing
- Lestes forcipatus, sweetflag spreadwing
- Lestes inaequalis, elegant spreadwing
- Lestes rectangularis, slender spreadwing
- Lestes stultus, black spreadwing
- Lestes unguiculatus, lyre-tipped spreadwing
- Lestes vigilax, swamp spreadwing

== Family Coenagrionidae, pond damsels ==
=== Genus Amphiagrion ===
- Amphiagrion abbreviatum, western red damsel
- Amphiagrion saucium, eastern red damsel

=== Genus Argia, dancers ===
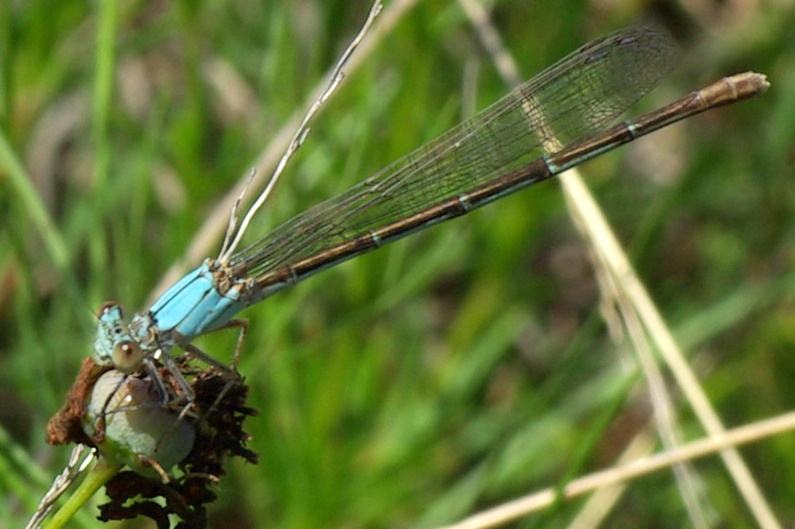
Powdered dancer (Argia moesta)

- Argia alberta, Paiute dancer
- Argia apicalis, blue-fronted dancer
- Argia bipunctulata, seepage dancer
- Argia emma, Emma's dancer
- Argia fumipennis, variable dancer and violet dancer
- Argia moesta, powdered dancer
- Argia plana, springwater dancer
- Argia tibialis, blue-tipped dancer
- Argia translata, dusky dancer
- Argia vivida, vivid dancer

=== Genus Chromagrion ===
- Chromagrion conditum, aurora damsel

=== Genus Chrysobasis ===
- Chrysobasis lucifer, tail-light damsel

=== Genus Coenagrion, Eurasian bluets ===
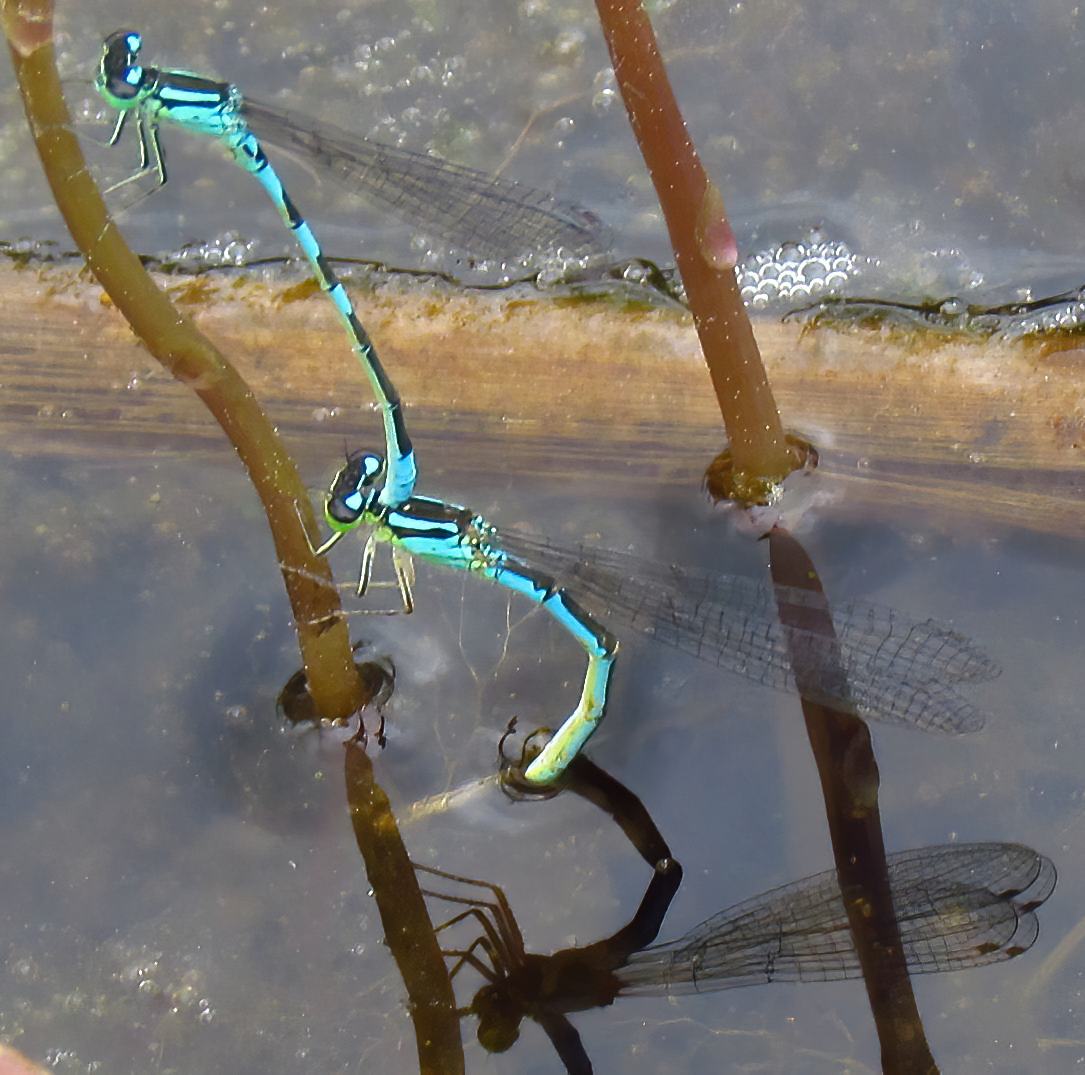
Taiga bluets (Coenagrion resolutum)

- Coenagrion angulatum, prairie bluet
- Coenagrion interrogatum, Subarctic bluet
- Coenagrion resolutum, taiga bluet

=== Genus Enallagma, bluets ===
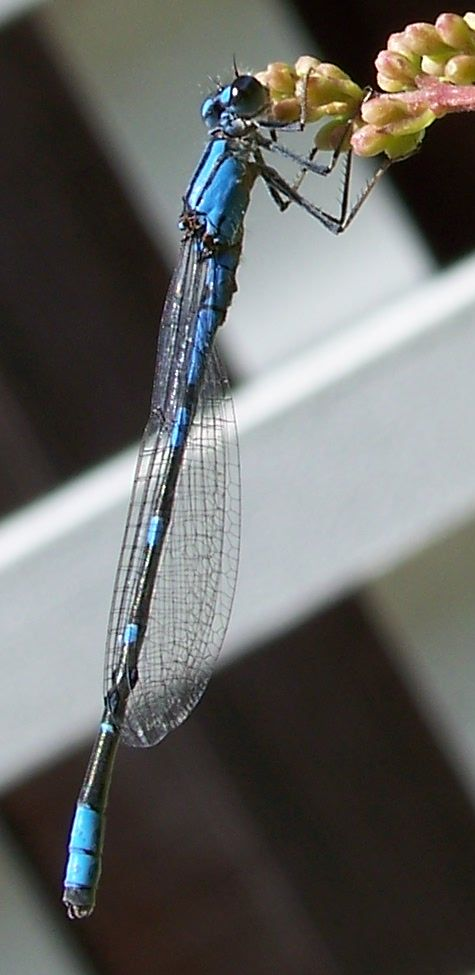
Tule bluet (Enallagma carunculatum)

- Enallagma anna, river bluet
- Enallagma antennatum, rainbow bluet
- Enallagma aspersum, azure bluet
- Enallagma basidens, double-striped bluet
- Enallagma boreale, boreal bluet
- Enallagma carunculatum, tule bluet
- Enallagma civile, familiar bluet
- Enallagma clausum, alkali bluet
- Enallagma cyathigerum, northern bluet
- Enallagma daeckii, attenuated bluet
- Enallagma divagans, turquoise bluet
- Enallagma doubledayi, Atlantic bluet
- Enallagma durum, big bluet
- Enallagma ebrium, marsh bluet
- Enallagma exsulans, stream bluet
- Enallagma geminatum, skimming bluet
- Enallagma hageni, Hagen's bluet
- Enallagma laterale, New England bluet
- Enallagma minusculum, little bluet
- Enallagma pallidum, pale bluet
- Enallagma pictum, scarlet bluet
- Enallagma praevarum, arroyo bluet
- Enallagma recurvatum, pine barrens bluet
- Enallagma signatum, orange bluet
- Enallagma traviatum, slender bluet
- Enallagma vesperum, vesper bluet

=== Genus Ischnura, forktails ===
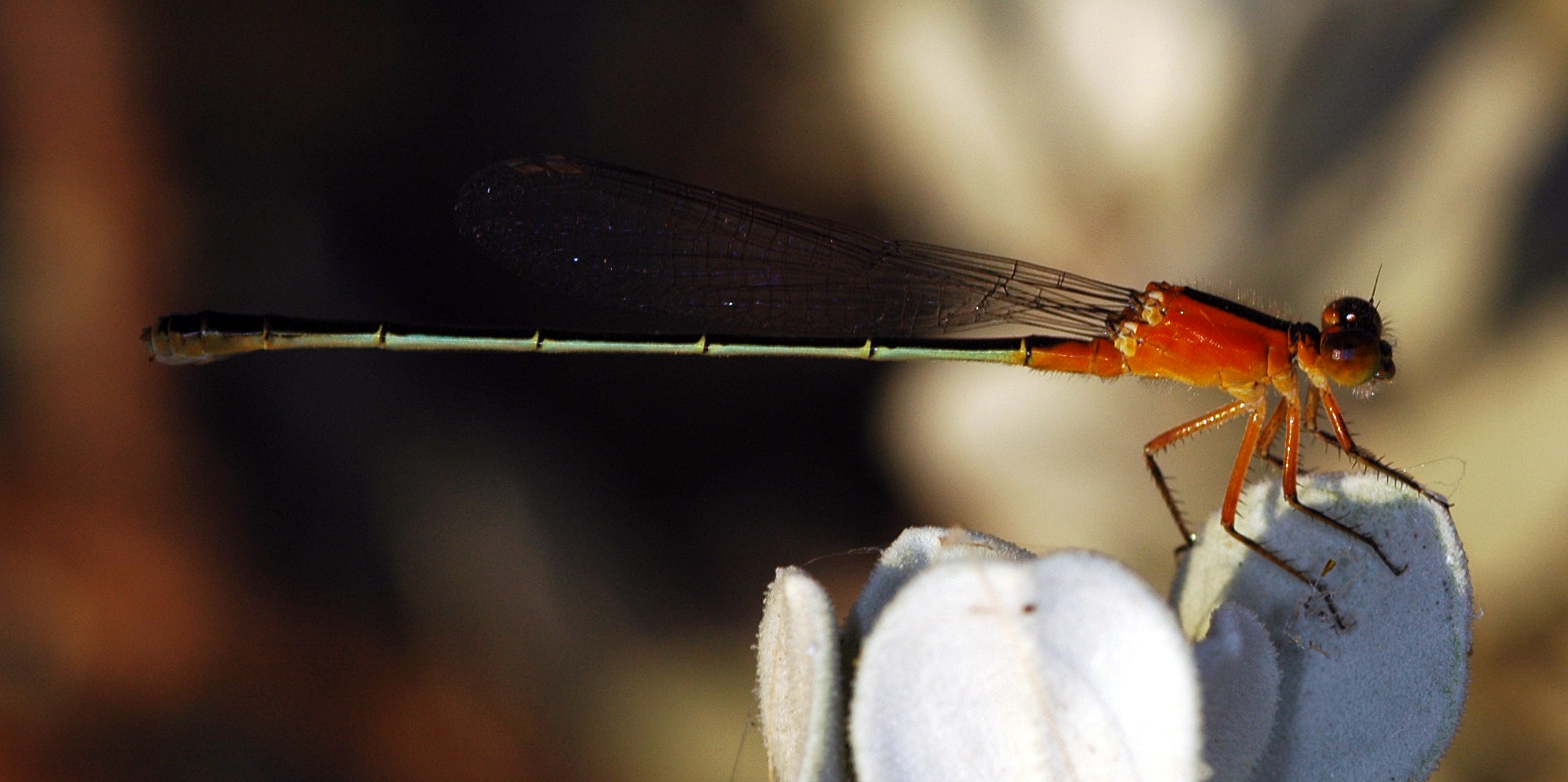
Eastern forktail (Ischnura verticalis)

- Ischnura cervula, Pacific forktail
- Ischnura damula, plains forktail
- Ischnura hastata, citrine forktail
- Ischnura kellicotti, lilypad forktail
- Ischnura posita, fragile forktail
- Ischnura verticalis, eastern forktail

=== Genus Nehalennia, sprites ===
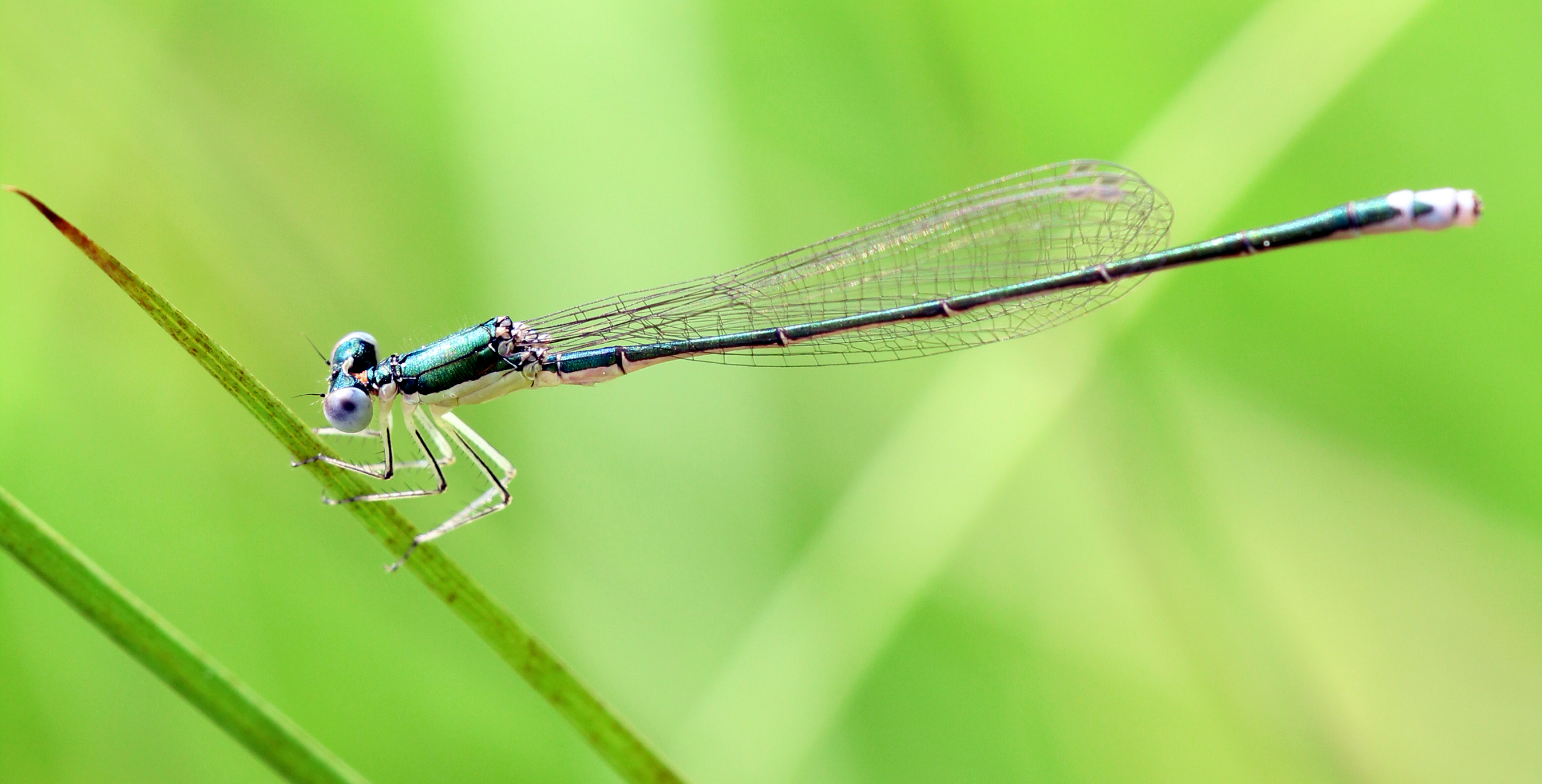
Sedge sprite

- Nehalennia gracilis, sphagnum sprite
- Nehalennia irene, sedge sprite

=== Genus Telebasis, firetails ===
- Telebasis byersi, duckweed firetail

== See also ==
- List of butterflies of Canada
- List of moths of Canada
- List of dragonflies of Canada
