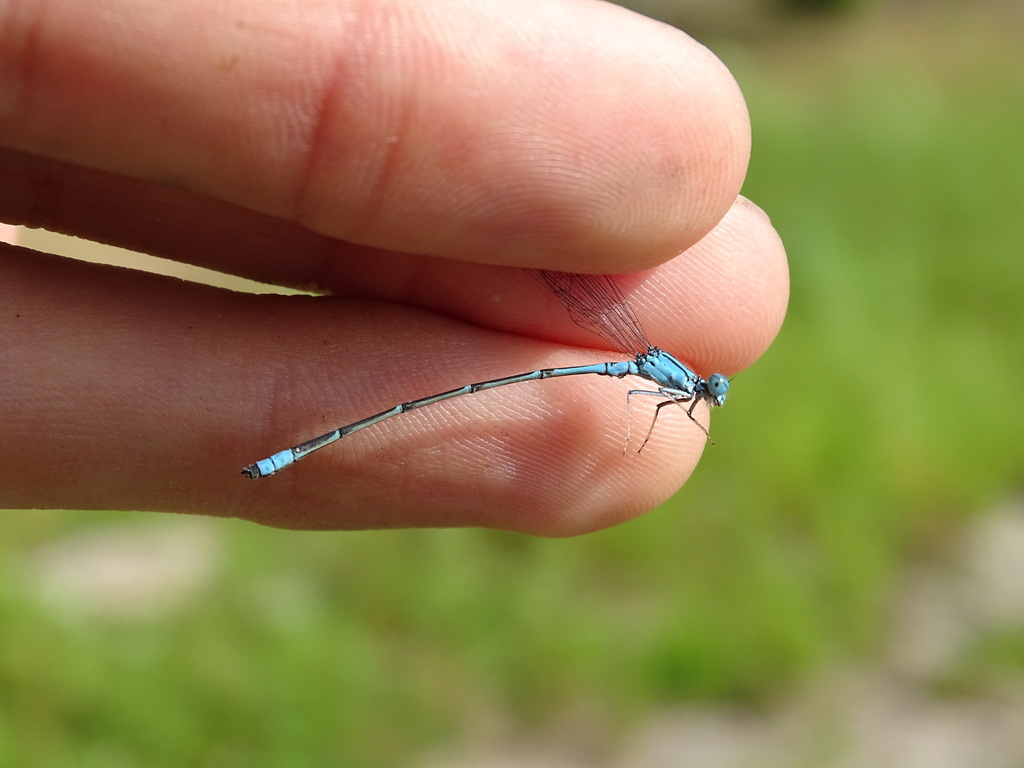

Conservation status
- Least Concern (IUCN 3.1)

Scientific classification
- Kingdom: Animalia
- Phylum: Arthropoda
- Clade: Pancrustacea
- Class: Insecta
- Order: Odonata
- Suborder: Zygoptera
- Family: Coenagrionidae
- Genus: Enallagma
- Species: E. traviatum

Binomial name
- Enallagma traviatum (Selys, 1876)

= Slender bluet =

Species of damselfly

Enallagma traviatum is a species of small damselfly in the family Coenagrionidae. It is commonly known as the slender bluet. The slender is small about 29–32 mm in length.

== Identification ==
The slender bluet, as its common name implies is a blue damselfly with a thin abdomen. The eyespots of both genders are large, with a thin blue line between them. The black shoulder stripes are thin in both genders. On the male slender bluet his abdominal segments 8 and 9 are blue. Segment 10 of the male is black and its terminal appendages are longer than its similar species. On the female slender bluet her segments 8-10 are blue, while the top of segment 8 is a black bar or T-shaped mark.

== Habitat ==
Slender bluets are found along large ponds and lakes, particularly those with the forest edge nearby. It flies generally in June and July in Oklahoma.

== Distribution ==
- United States: (Alabama • Arkansas • Connecticut • District Of Columbia • Delaware • Florida • Georgia • Iowa • Illinois • Indiana • Kansas • Kentucky • Louisiana • Massachusetts • Maryland • Michigan • Missouri • Mississippi • North Carolina • New Hampshire • New Jersey • Ohio • Pennsylvania • Rhode Island • South Carolina • Tennessee • Texas • Vermont • Wisconsin • West Virginia)
- Canada: (Ontario)

== Similar species ==
The slender bluet has many species that are similar to it. One of the similar species is the skimming Bluet which is found in similar habitats. It is also similar to the stream bluet and turquoise bluet which are usually found along streams and last the attenuated bluet found in the Pine Barrens.

== Flight season ==
Slender bluets are usually fly from late May to early September. Its flight season depends on where it is distributed.

== Subspecies ==
Enallagma traviatum has two different subspecies. The following are the two subspecies:

- Enallagma traviatum traviatum
- Enallagma traviatum westfalli
