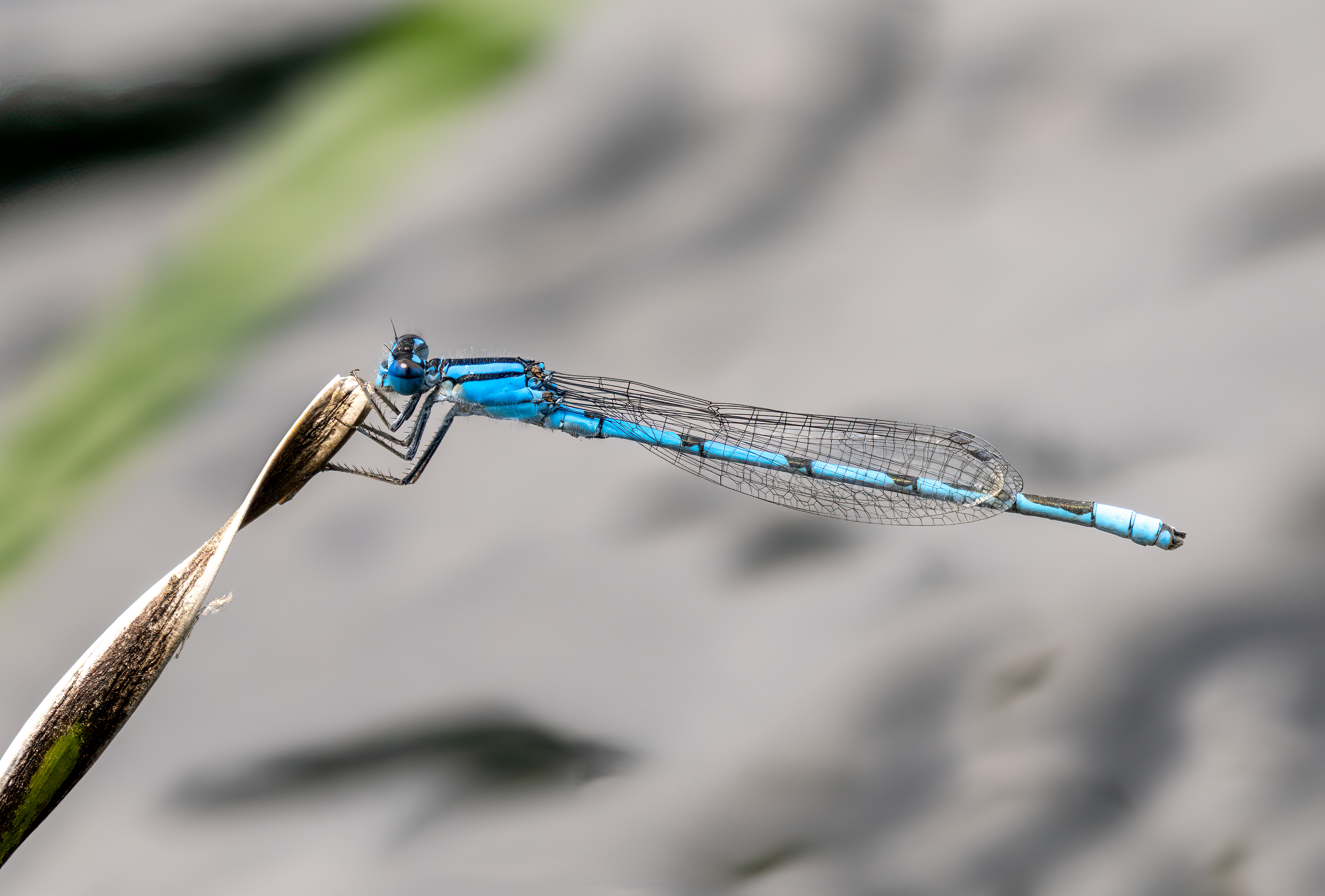
- Male

Conservation status
- Least Concern (IUCN 3.1)

Scientific classification
- Kingdom: Animalia
- Phylum: Arthropoda
- Clade: Pancrustacea
- Class: Insecta
- Order: Odonata
- Suborder: Zygoptera
- Family: Coenagrionidae
- Genus: Enallagma
- Species: E. civile

Binomial name
- Enallagma civile (Hagen, 1861)

= Familiar bluet =

Species of damselfly

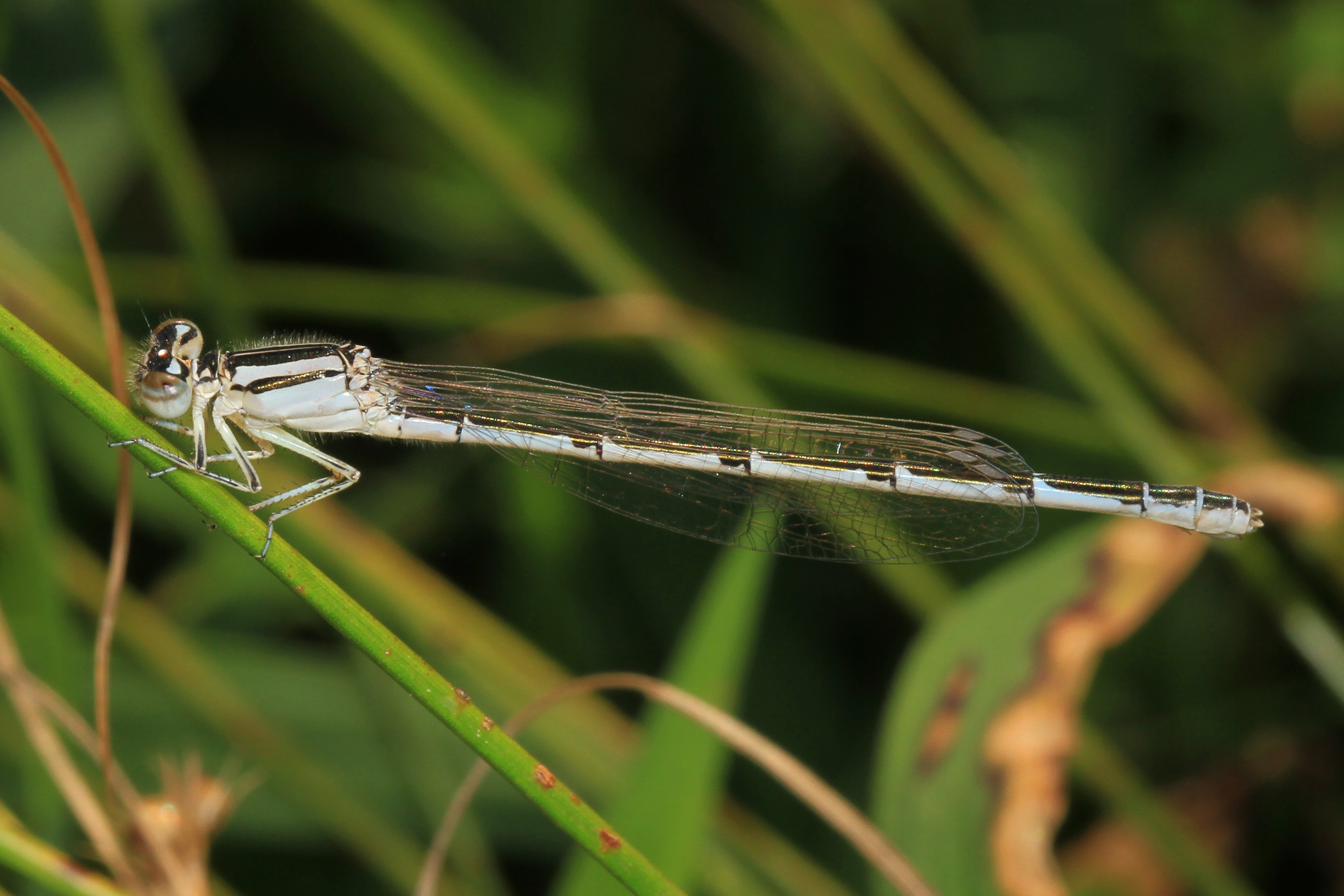
Dull-coloring for female familiar bluet

The familiar bluet (Enallagma civile) is a narrow-winged damselfly of the family Coenagrionidae, which is native to much of the United States and southern Canada. In a broader sense, it is a part of the order Odonata. It is an order that consists of predatory flying insects, such as dragonflies and damselflies. Damselflies are structurally similar to dragonflies, except damselflies have a slimmer body and they have widely-separated eyes; whereas dragonflies have larger eyes that nearly touch.

The familiar bluet have been found to reside in natural or artificially-made ponds, or simply places where bodies of non-polluted freshwater and vegetation are located: lakes, ponds, or slow streams. The familiar bluet is generally less tolerant of significant chemical imbalances, thus helping to indicate pure water quality. It has a torpedo-shaped thorax that tapers into a slender abdomen, separated by an average of 10 segments, and it is on average 30-39 mm in length. The familiar bluet has a striking resemblance to the tule bluet, bearing the same sky-blue and black bodies, but differs due to the less heavy black coloration on the abdomen and thorax.

Familiar bluets display sexual dimorphism. Male familiar bluets have a distinct bright, blue color that covers the majority of its head and body and has jet-black spots that cover the dorsal portion of its eyes, segments and upper abdomen. Females are polymorphic; they may appear in nature as a pale blue or an olive-tan color.

The life cycle of damselflies is an incomplete metamorphosis. Once the familiar bluets hatch from their eggs, they are in their nymphal stage, where they will spend the majority of the lifetime molting and developing important adult anatomical structures.

== Taxonomy ==
The genus, Enallagma, is one of the largest within the suborder Zygoptera, with about seventy species spanning most of North America and sub-Saharan Africa. Enallagma is divided into two smaller subgenera: Enallagma sensu stricto (meaning "Enallagma in the strict sense") and Chromatallagma.

The subgroup Enallagma s.s. represents the typical bluets, including the familiar bluet and many other species located in many areas of North America, the Holarctic and Palearctic regions.

The subgroup Chromatallagma typically reside in regions of North America, the Caribbean, and the northern South Africa. This subgroup contains species of damselflies with varying colors: males have a pale blue, red, orange, or yellow colored thorax; females are pale blue, green, tan or dull yellow to orange (e.g., Enallagma vesperum, Enallagma signatum, and Enallagma weewa).

The species, Enallagma civile, was identified by German entomologist, Herman August Hagen, in 1861. However, it was originally identified by Hagen under the name, Agrion civile, in his scientific work "Synopsis of the Neuroptera of North America". Agrion civil is the French scientific/common name for the familiar bluet (Enallagma civile).

Hybrid complexes between the E. civile and other species have been found in areas of Ontario, Canada and Iowa, USA. In Iowa, there has been recordings of hybrids with the E. civile and the Enallagma anna. These hybrids can be identified by closely analyzing intermediate structures in the male cerci, otherwise known as the sensory appendages, located at the rear of the insect abdomen. Additionally, researchers are able to distinguish between the pure species and hybrid species by comparing these cerci.

== Life cycle ==
The life cycle for damselflies and dragonflies is generally the same; their life cycle goes through incomplete metamorphosis that is split into three stages: egg, nymph (larva), and adult. As the nymph progresses into the adult stage, the damselfly's main purpose is to mate through a unique mating behavior called the copulation wheel.

Female damselflies will conduct exploratory flights to disperse their eggs across the multiple locations onto aquatic vegetation. Their high tolerance to varying environmental conditions, (e.g., winds, temperatures, food resources), allows this species to prosper and remain abundant.

=== Egg ===
Female damselflies lay their eggs in the summer and eggs will be expected to hatch within a few weeks. Eggs can be found on the surface of the water or on the leaves of aquatic vegetation. The newly hatched damselflies are now called nymphs (larvae).

=== Nymph (Larva) ===
Nymphs are considered to be aquatic predators that look similar to small crayfish or water fleas. Damselfly nymphs have six long legs and are unique in the way that it has three external gills, located at the tip of its abdomen, propelling themselves underwater. Additionally, damselfly nymphs possess a detachable lower jaw known as the labium. It has the ability to extend this structure and quickly impale its prey.

Throughout the nymph stage, nymphs will molt several times in preparation for the adult stage. Upon completion of its final molt, the nymphs will undergo metamorphosis and emerge onto land to become an air-breathing adult. The exoskeleton left behind from its final molt is called the exuviae.

=== Adult ===
Following metamorphosis, the adult damselfly will emerge soft-bodied and are referred to as tenerals. As time progresses, the newly-emerged exoskeleton of the damselfly will harden and its wings will unfold. Initially, the coloration on the familiar bluet will appear dull; its colors will brighten and become vivid over the next few days.

As stated prior, the familiar bluet belongs in a subgenera Enallagma s.s., that represents species with the "typical" bluet colors. The E. civile's bright blue coloring can be explained by its spherical nano-structures within the epidermal cells, located beneath the cuticles. Additionally, researchers have found that the bright-blue integumentary colors are not produced by Tyndall scattering, but rather the complex and organized nano-structures. These spherical structures exist on the chest and abdomen of the E. civile. The spherical structures diameter, as well as its closely-packed arrangement in the endoplasmic reticulum, allows it to emit a wavelength of about 500 nanometers; this wavelength measurement is equivalent to a cyan-blue hue.

== Behavior ==
Familiar bluets tend to spend the majority of their lifetime either underwater (nymphs) or hunting prey above the surface of slow-moving water. The E. civile nymphs (naiads) have been found to predominantly predate on chironomid larvae, as well as corixids, cladocerans, ostracods, and aquatic mites. Their voracious appetite helps regulate the small insect populations within their habitats.

Familiar bluet perched on a branch

=== Males ===
Males have been found to exhibit aggressive behavior when it comes to protecting their territory; this area is approximately 20 cm in diameter. During this defensive mechanism, the male familiar bluets do not show complex flight maneuvers to ward off intruders, but instead simple wing clapping. The right and left wings of the bluet slightly separate then quickly return, repeating this mechanism several times. Another method of warding off intruders is by simply flying towards them, then returning to its original perched position.

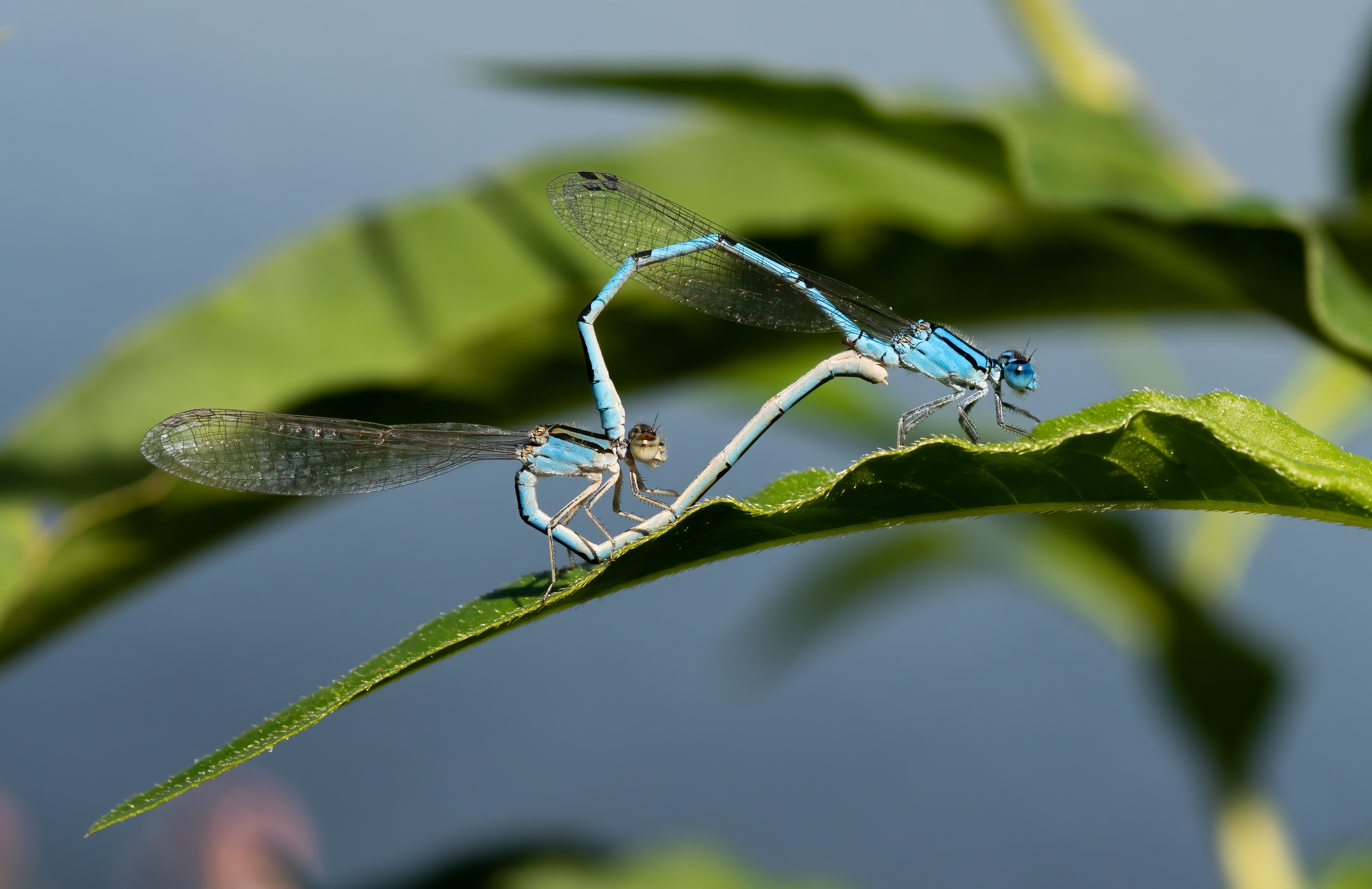
Familiar bluets mating: the male is in the front. It is using its claspers to attach to the female's head.

=== Mating ===
Generally, the order Odonata have very similar reproductive manners and anatomical structures, with only slight variations for each species.

Males possess two reproductive anatomical structures. The primary genitalia is responsible for producing sperm. The secondary genitalia is used for insemination, which is located at the second segment.

Once the male familiar bluet grasps onto a female, this is known as the tandem position. Next, the sperm that is produced in the primary genitalia translocates to the secondary genitalia. The female bluet bends her abdomen forward to connect her genitalia with the male's secondary genitalia, forming the heart-shaped copulation "wheel."

The tandem pair conducts exploratory flights in order to find ideal ovipositing sites: directly on the water's surface or under vegetation. In total, both the copulation process and ovipositing flights last about an hour.

== Distribution and habitat ==
Familiar bluets are generally found in freshwater aquatic habitats with vegetation: lakes, ponds, marshes, and slow moving streams. This aligns with the bluets' mating behaviors where the female damselfly oviposits her eggs directly on the water's surface or on emergent vegetation.

A study conducted in Maine, USA, found that the E. civile flight period spans from mid-June to mid-October. Additionally, the study suggests that this species (specifically in Maine) overwinters in the nymphal stage.

== Conservation ==
Familiar bluets are listed as a "G5" ranking under the species of potential concern. This indicates that this species population is secure and it is at a very low risk of global extinction.
