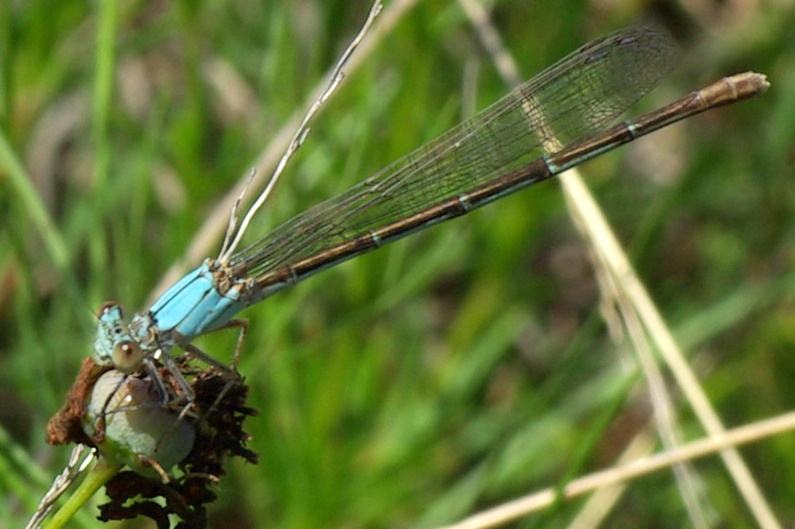

Conservation status
- Least Concern (IUCN 3.1)

- Secure (NatureServe)

Scientific classification
- Kingdom: Animalia
- Phylum: Arthropoda
- Class: Insecta
- Order: Odonata
- Suborder: Zygoptera
- Family: Coenagrionidae
- Genus: Argia
- Species: A. moesta

Binomial name
- Argia moesta (Hagen, 1861)
- Range of A. moesta

= Powdered dancer =

Species of damselfly

The powdered dancer (Argia moesta) is a damselfly of the family Coenagrionidae. It is native to North America. It may be seen year-round in at least some of its range.

== Etymology ==
The common name refers directly to the male's pruinosity, appearing to be covered with a powdery blue or grayish substance. Older males are more pruinose, and may even be more ash white than blue. The specific epithet moesta, means sorrowful, and may refer to customs (such as those on Ash Wednesday) of dusting oneself with ashes to express sorrow or mourning.

== Description ==
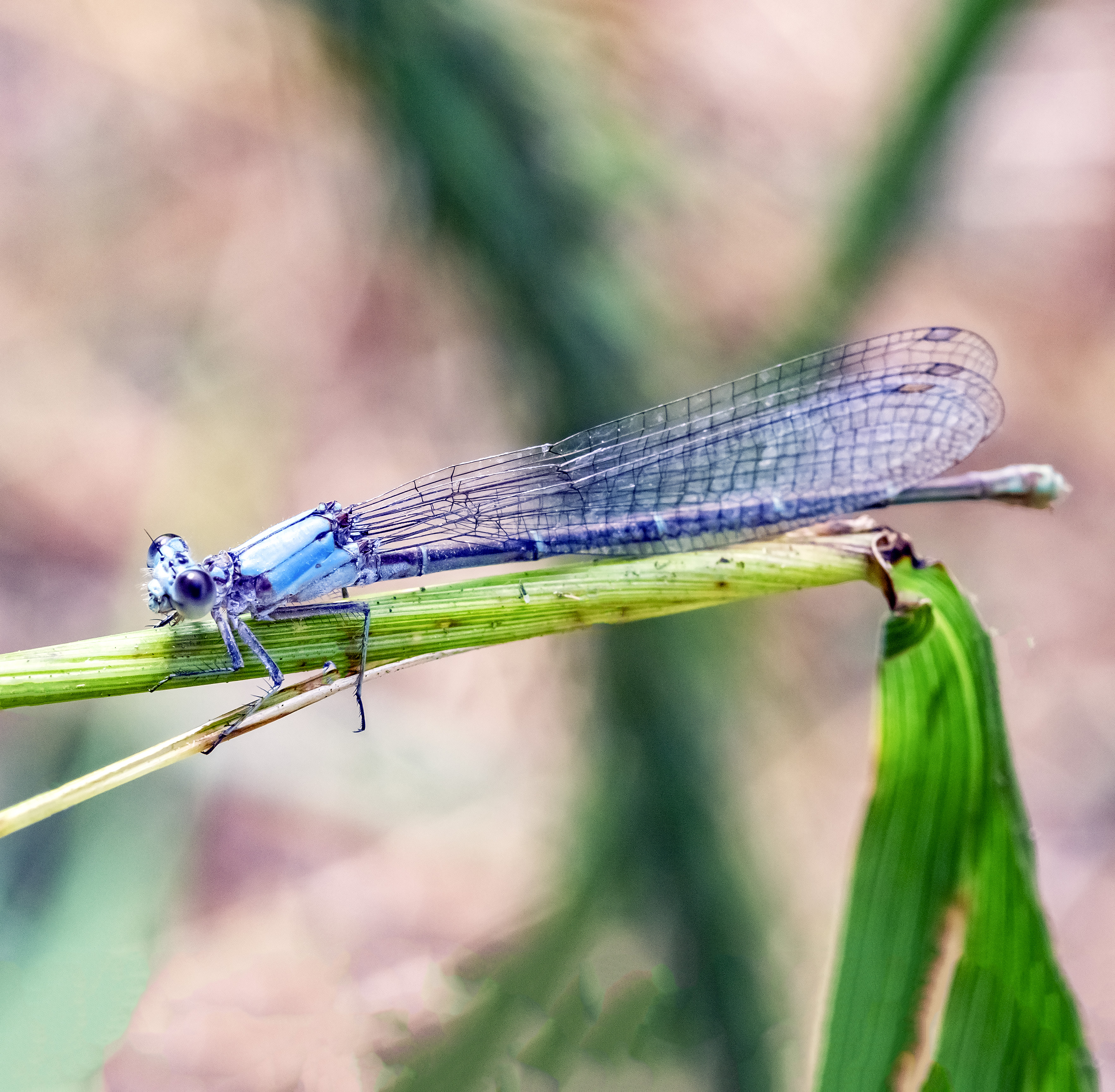
Powdered dancer (Argia moesta)

Males have a blue tip at the end of the abdomen. Immature (freshly moulted, or teneral) males are tan to dark brown, turning darker with age and becoming almost completely whitish (pruinose) at maturity. Females come in blue and brown forms based on the color of the thorax, which has hair thin dark shoulder stripes. The blue form female is very similar to the female blue-fronted dancer; a key to separating these two is the number of cells below the stigma: our species has two cells below the stigma where a blue-fronted dancer has one.

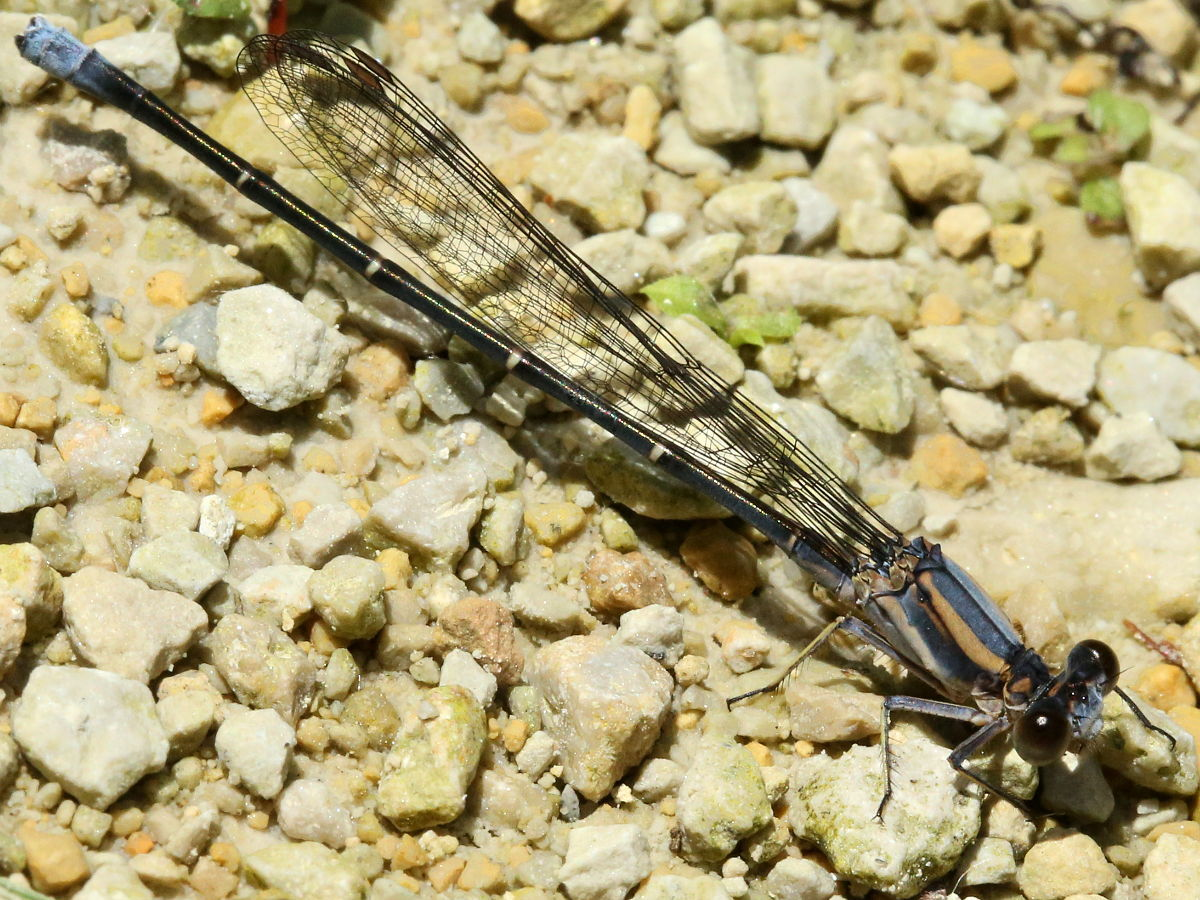
teneral male

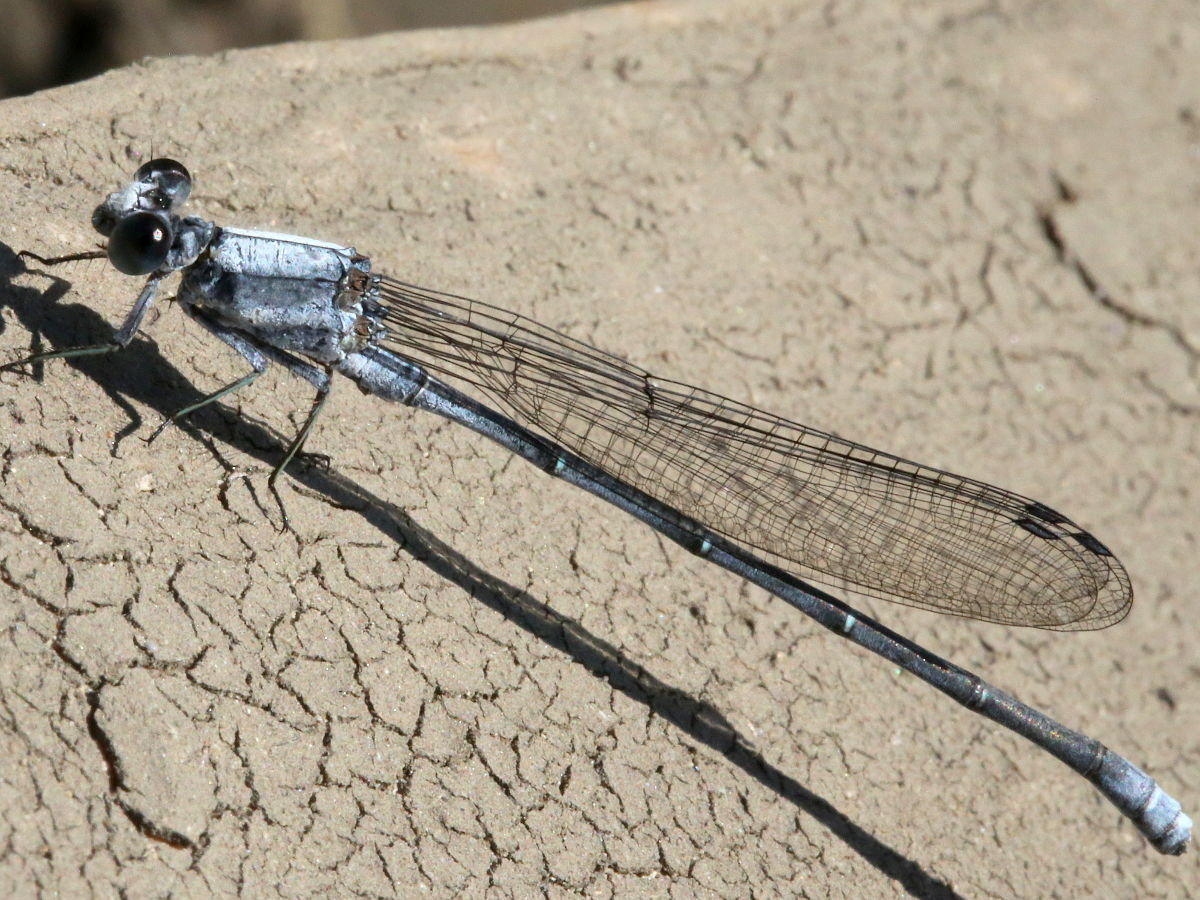
mature male

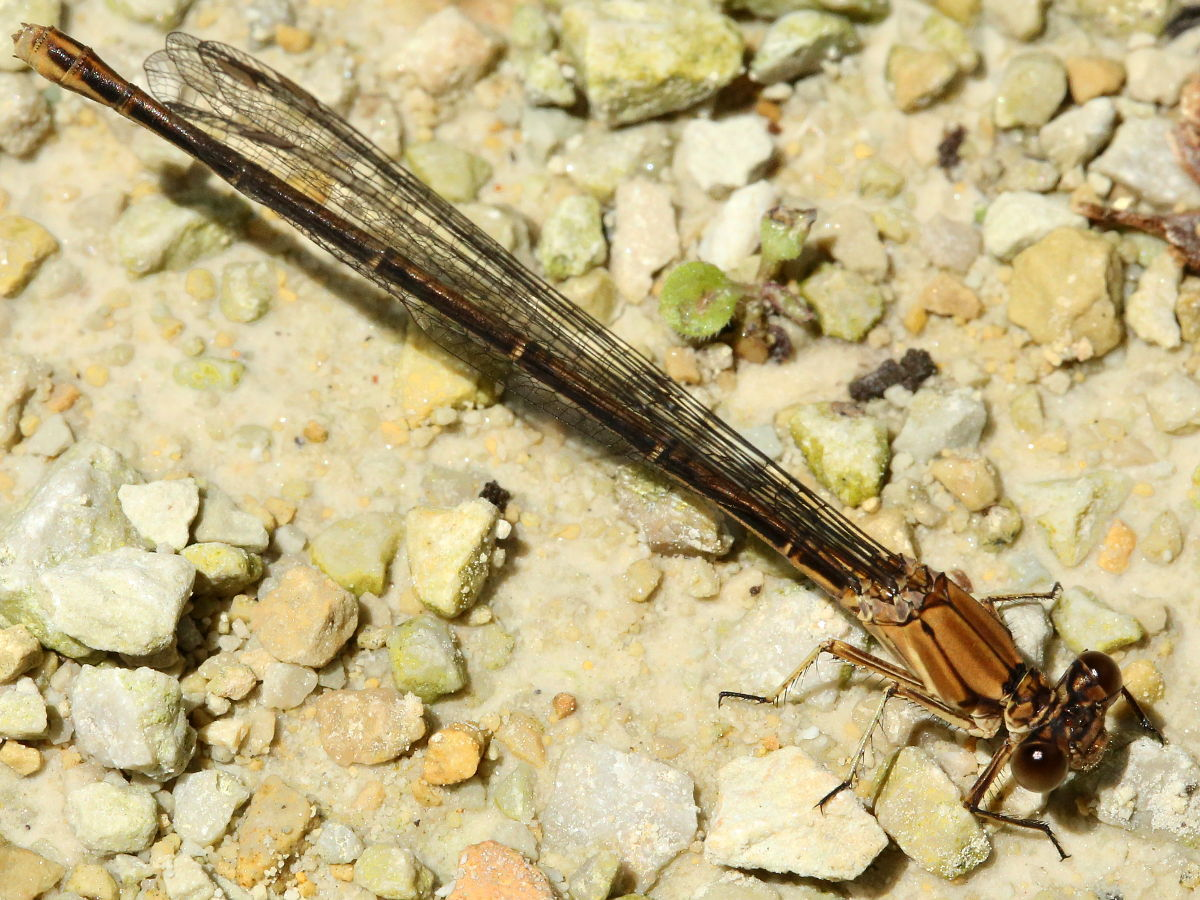
brown form female

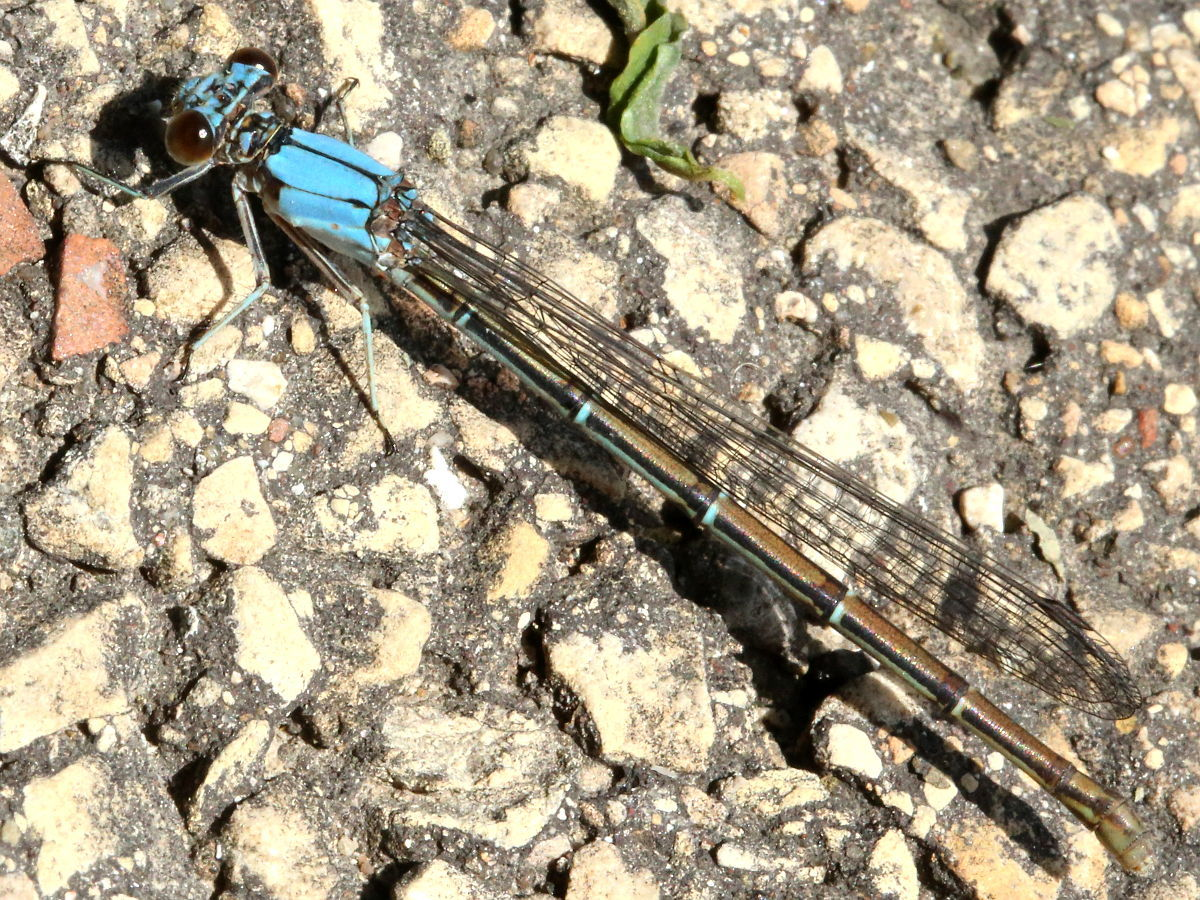
blue form female

== Breeding ==
During mating, a male uses claspers at the end of his abdomen to grab a female between the head and thorax, forming a tandem. The female then bends her abdomen to engage segments 2–3 of the male, where sperm is stored, forming a heart-shaped "mating wheel". Both sexes can change color during mating. The pair often remains attached until eggs are laid by the female. The female finds a shallow aquatic plant and uses her ovipositor to insert her eggs in dead or live tissue while guarded by her mate.

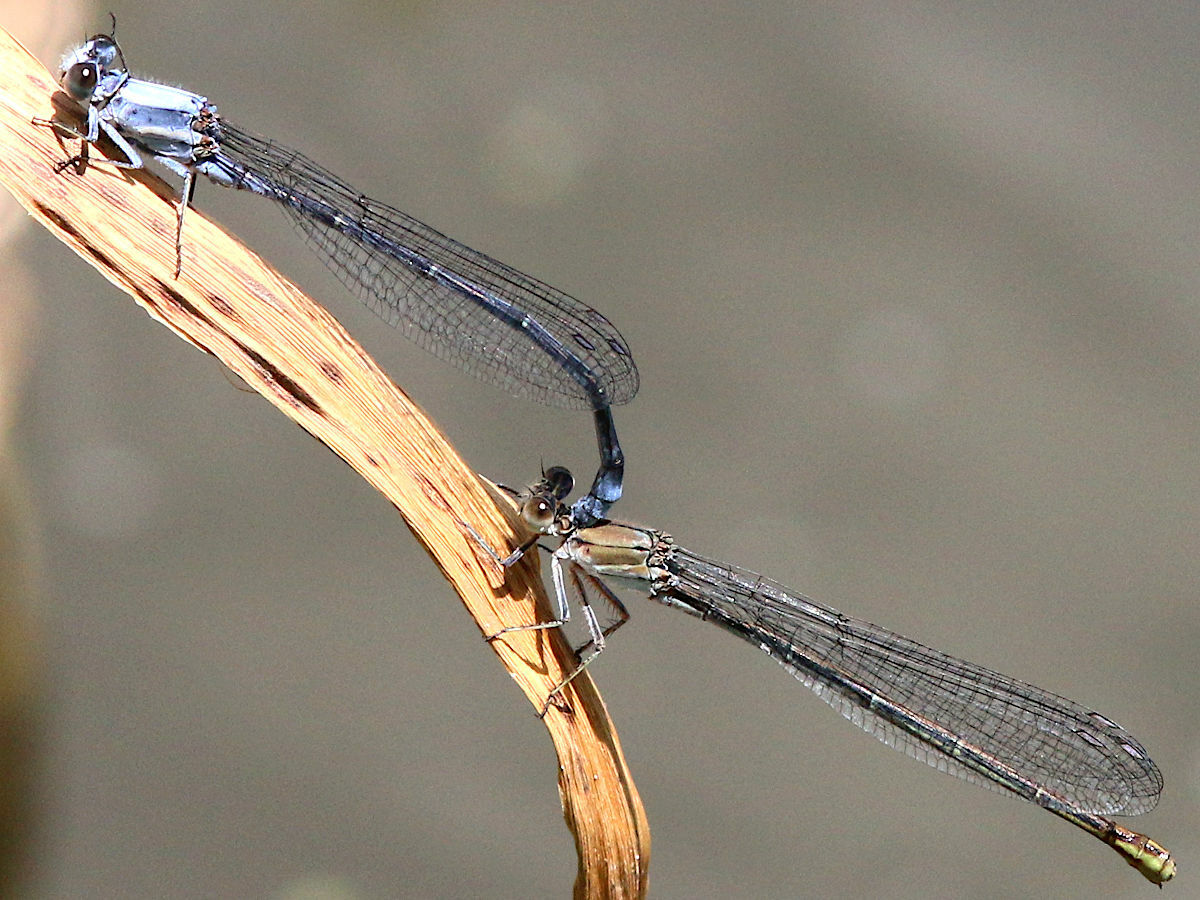
pair in tandem

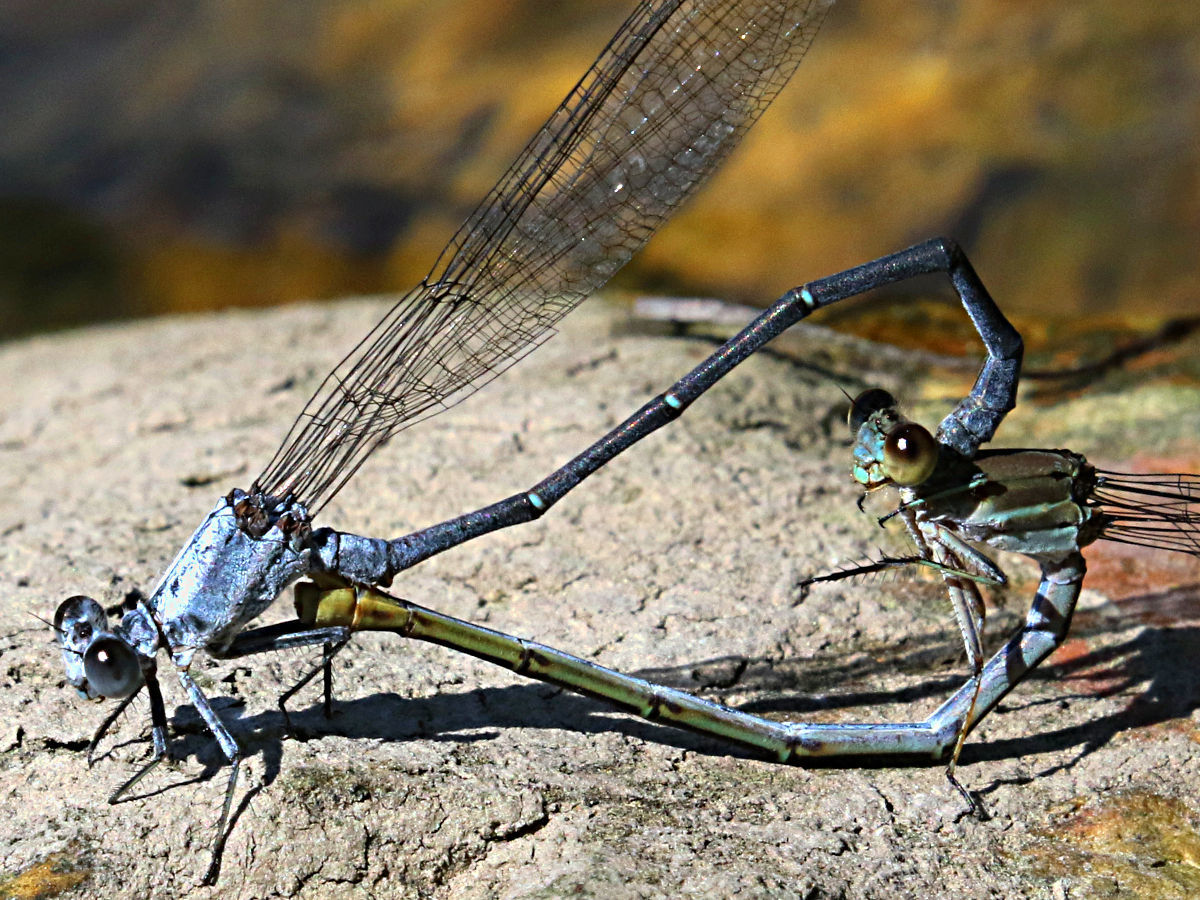
mating wheel

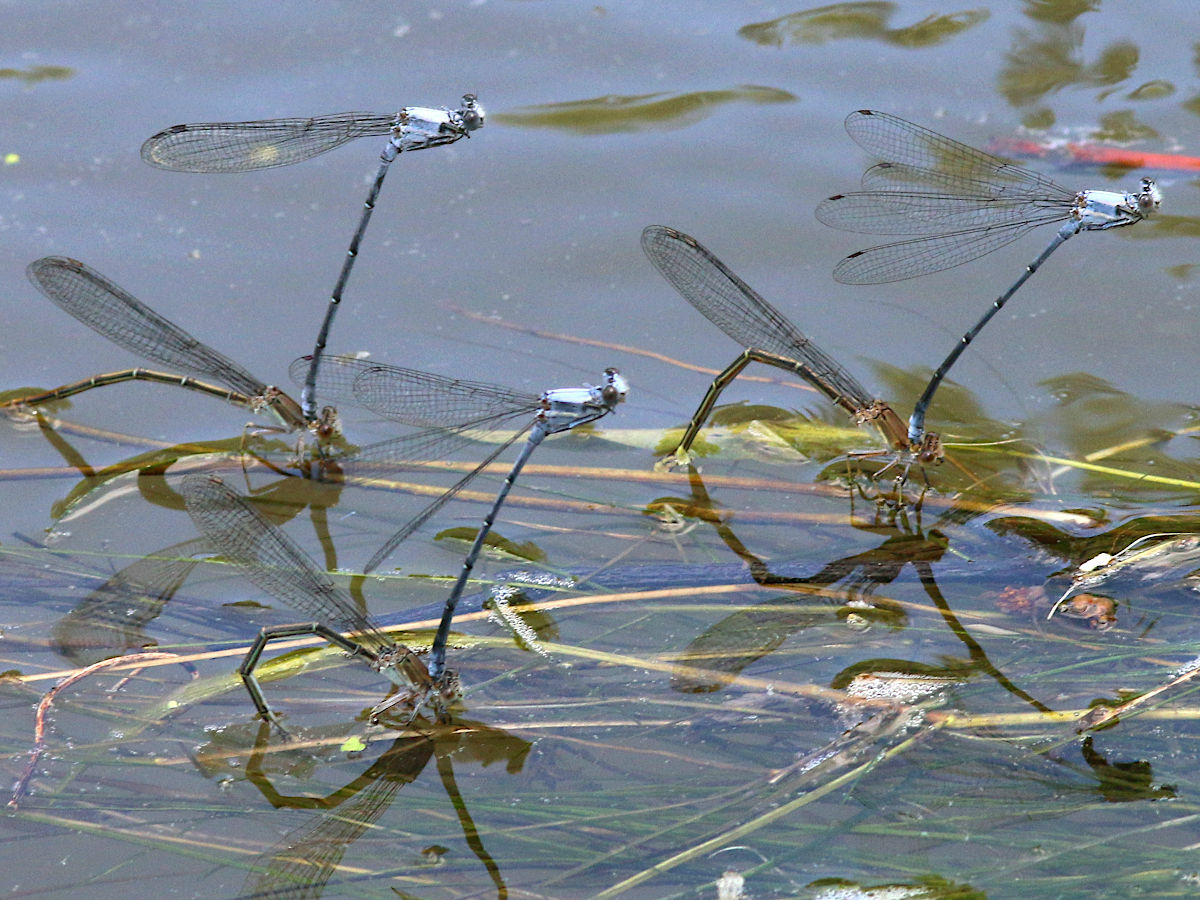
ovipositing
