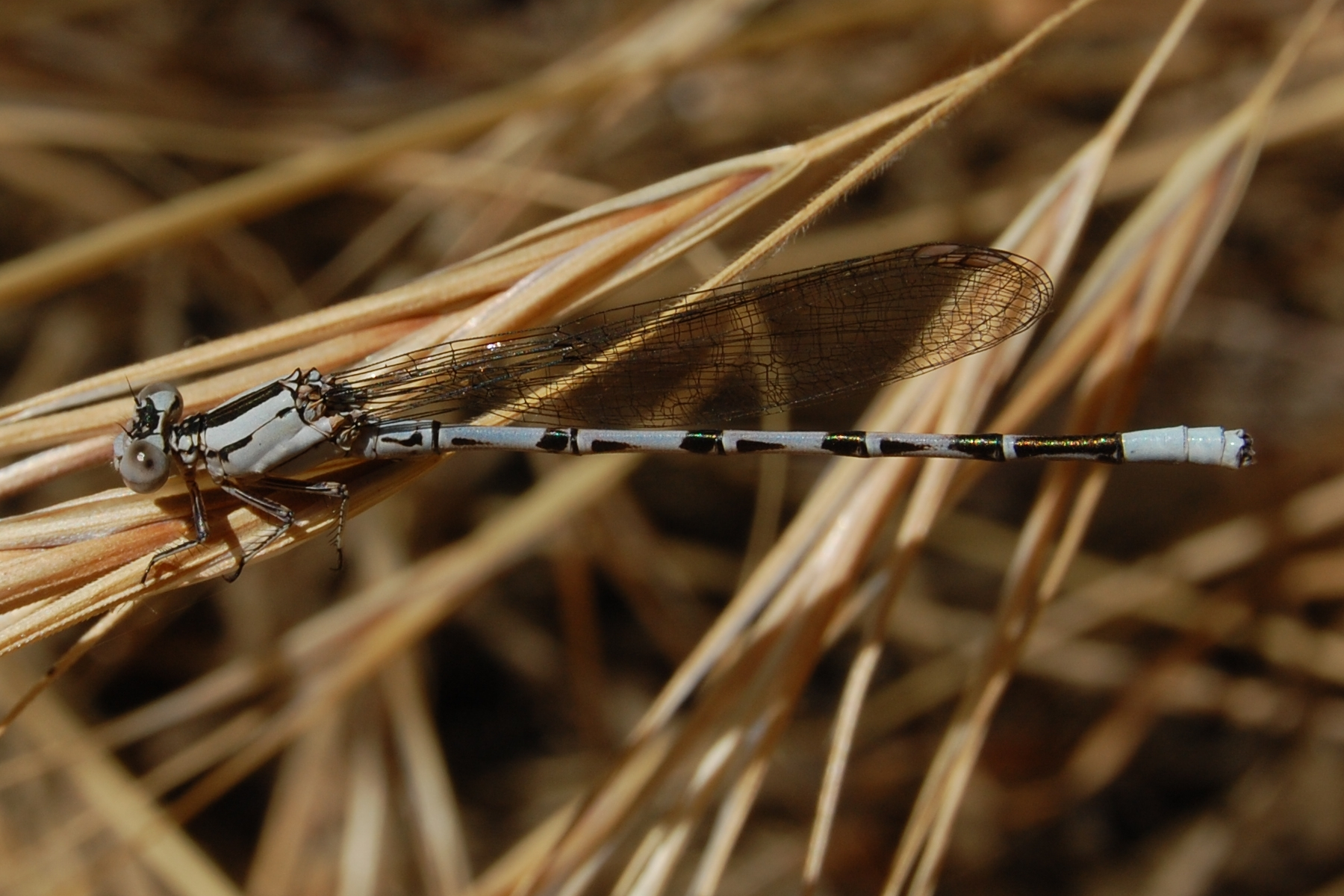
- Male
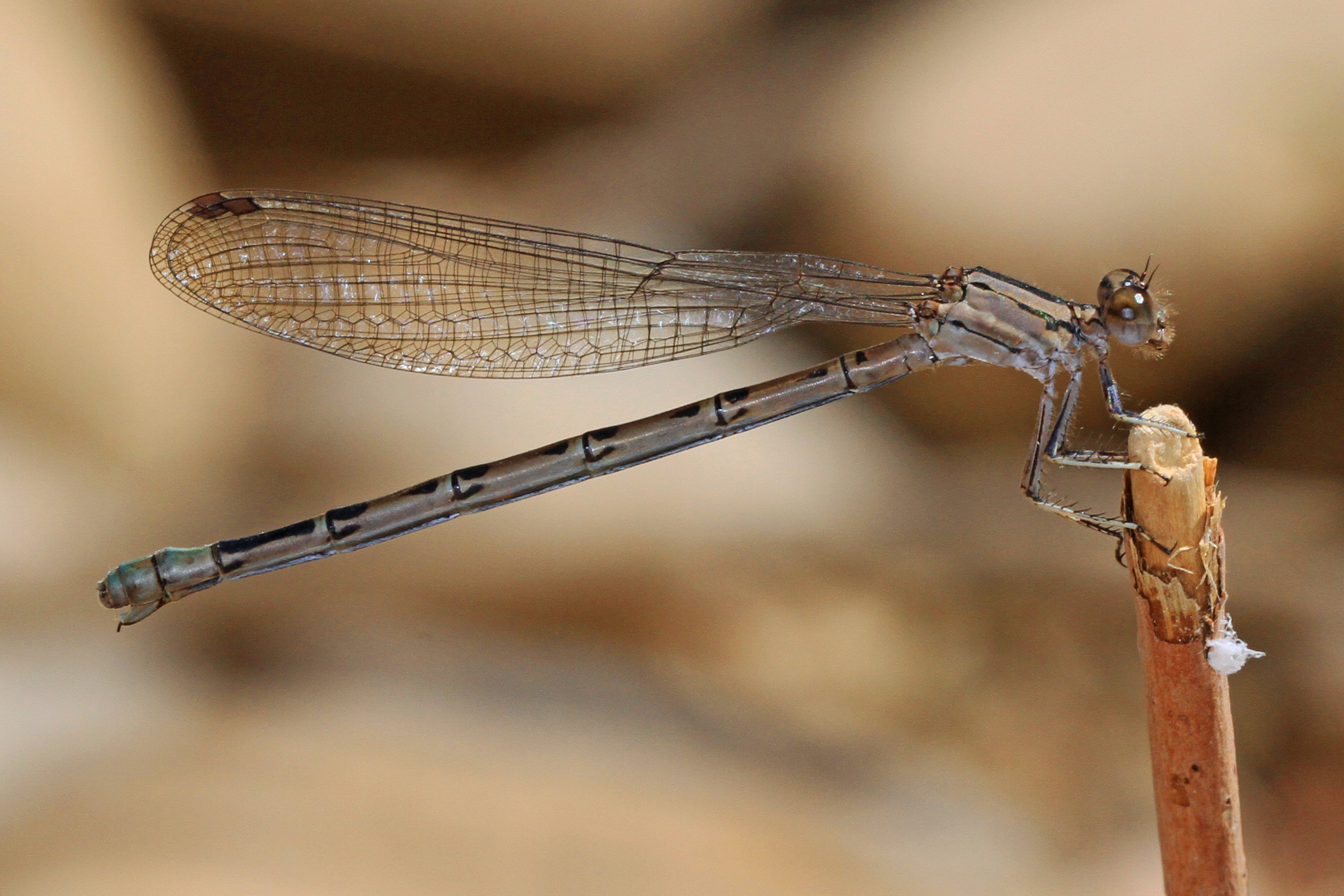
- Female, Utah

Conservation status
- Least Concern (IUCN 3.1)

Scientific classification
- Kingdom: Animalia
- Phylum: Arthropoda
- Class: Insecta
- Order: Odonata
- Suborder: Zygoptera
- Family: Coenagrionidae
- Genus: Argia
- Species: A. vivida

Binomial name
- Argia vivida Hagen in Selys, 1865

= Argia vivida =

Species of damselfly

Argia vivida, the vivid dancer, is a species of narrow-winged damselfly in the family Coenagrionidae. This species is commonly found in springs and forests of Central America and North America. Argia vivida inhabit areas of diverse temperatures due to thermoregulation. The species is also considered the state insect of Nevada.

Argia vivida vary in color, although they are typically associated with the bright blue coloration. Other variations include red, brown, or grey depending on the type of morph and temperature. Mating occurs in mornings and afternoons, and eggs are oviposited just below the surface of the water. Larvae and adults feed on larvae from small invertebrates and small flying insects, respectively.

The IUCN conservation status of Argia vivida is "LC", least concern, with no immediate threat to the species' population. The population is stable.

== Coloration ==
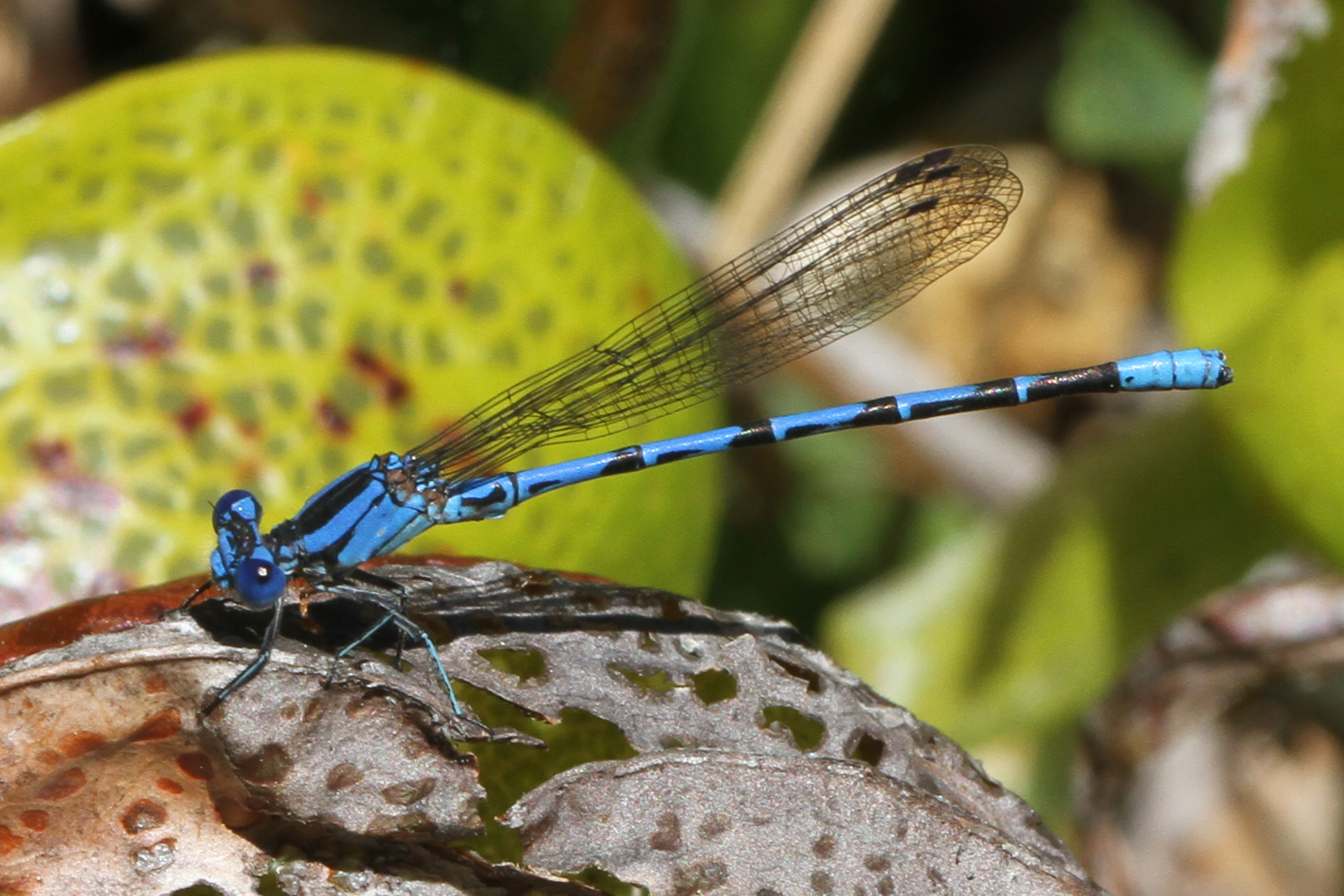
Blue-morph on pitcher plant in California

Female dimorphism occurs in two populations of Argia vivida from British Columbia, Canada. They are described as varying from a blue color morph and red color morph. Physiological color changes occur in males and both female morphs as a result of changing temperatures throughout the day. The two phases of color changes are denoted as the "bright phase" and "dark phase." Individuals transition to the bright phase as shade temperatures rise over 25°C; males and blue-morph females transition to a lighter shade of blue with pale blue or blue-grey markings, while red-morph females transition to a red-brown or brown with tan or grey-tan markings. At lower temperatures around 18°C, the dark phase occurs; males and blue-morph females transition to a darker blue shade, while red-morph females transition to a grey-brown to brown shade.

== Mating ==
Mates are encountered in two ways, morning matings or afternoon matings. In the morning, the males bask at sunspots and attempt to gain the attention of females by darting out at them. Successful males and females will then engage in copulation, tandem flight, and finally oviposition. In the afternoon, unmated males move towards the water and wait for an available female released from a previous mating pair. These new pairs begin the mating cycle once again but throughout a more brief time period than the morning matings.

== Life cycle ==
Upon mating, females lay their eggs on sources of vegetation just below the surface of the water. A temperature of at least 11°C is required for egg development, although larvae can overwinter in water temperatures in the range 0–33°C. In thermal springs, the life cycle takes approximately 1 year to complete, but may extend for up to 2 to 3 years in cooler springs. Argia vivida finally emerge as adults anytime between April through October depending on the current temperature.

== Diet ==
=== Larvae ===
Because Argia vivida larvae are aquatic, they typically feed on small invertebrates found in the water such as larvae from mosquitoes and mayflies.

=== Adults ===
Adult Argia vivida typically feed on a variety of soft-bodied, small flying insects including mosquitoes, flies, mayflies, and even small moths. In some cases, adults will also eat insects from plants such as small aphids.

== Thermoregulation and habitat ==
Argia vivida exhibit thermoregulation by living in habitats that allow for different thermal regimes throughout the day. At night, individuals typically settle in forest trees to maintain their body temperatures and slow the radiant loss of heat. During the day, they move away from the trees into sunspots available in thinned forest for thermal basking. Therefore, an ideal habitat for the species consists of a forest containing dense trees in addition to cleared patches or thinned forest to best suit their thermoregulation requirements.

In fuel-modified forests, Argia vivida still roost in trees at night but prefer cleared fuel treatment sections of the forest compared to thinned forest for the purposes of basking and foraging.
