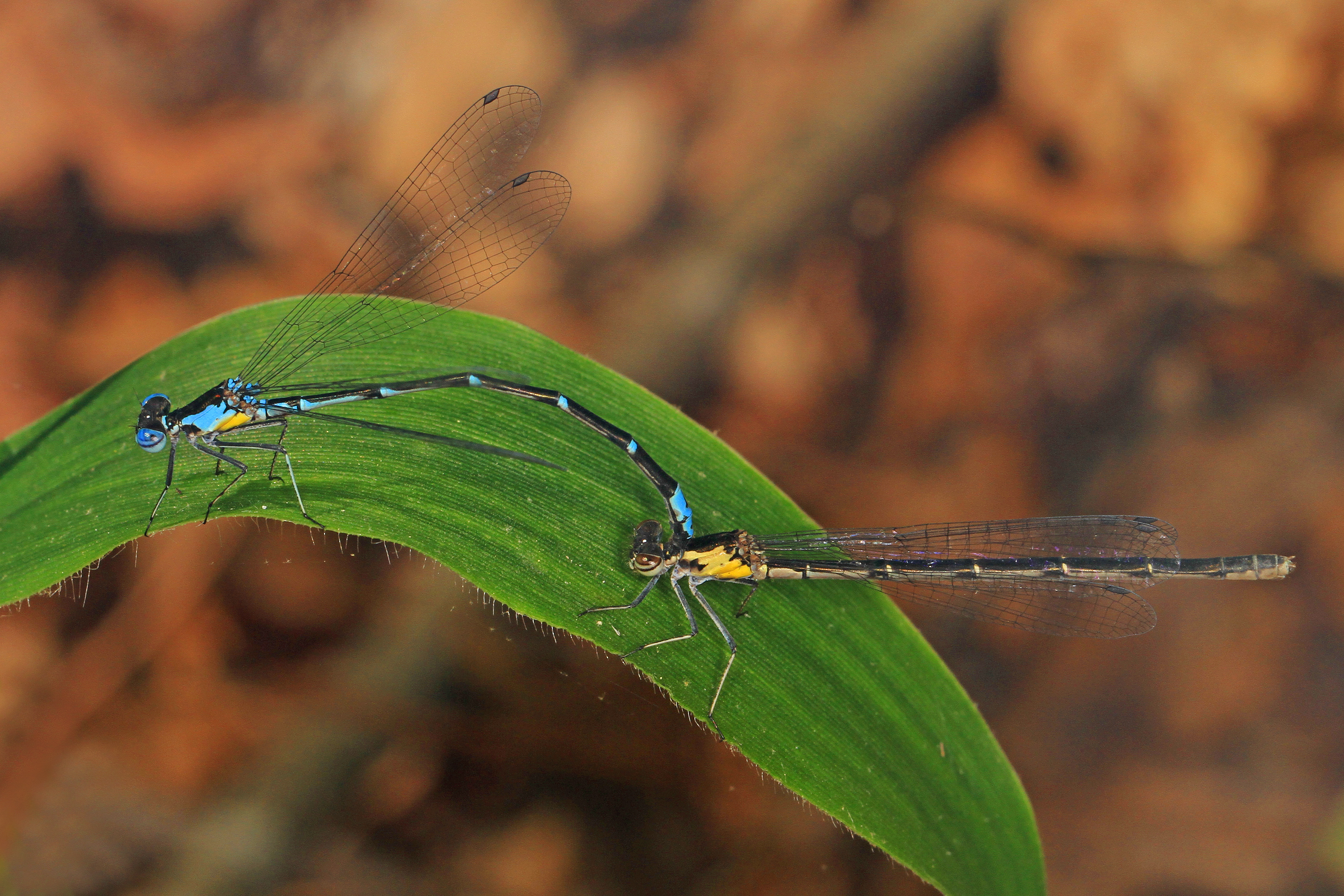

Conservation status
- Least Concern (IUCN 3.1)

Scientific classification
- Kingdom: Animalia
- Phylum: Arthropoda
- Class: Insecta
- Order: Odonata
- Suborder: Zygoptera
- Family: Coenagrionidae
- Genus: Chromagrion; Needham, 1903
- Species: C. conditum

Binomial name
- Chromagrion conditum (Selys, 1876)

= Chromagrion =

Chromagrion conditum

Genus of damselflies

Chromagrion is a genus of aurora damsels in the damselfly family Coenagrionidae. There is one described species in the genus, Chromagrion conditum.
