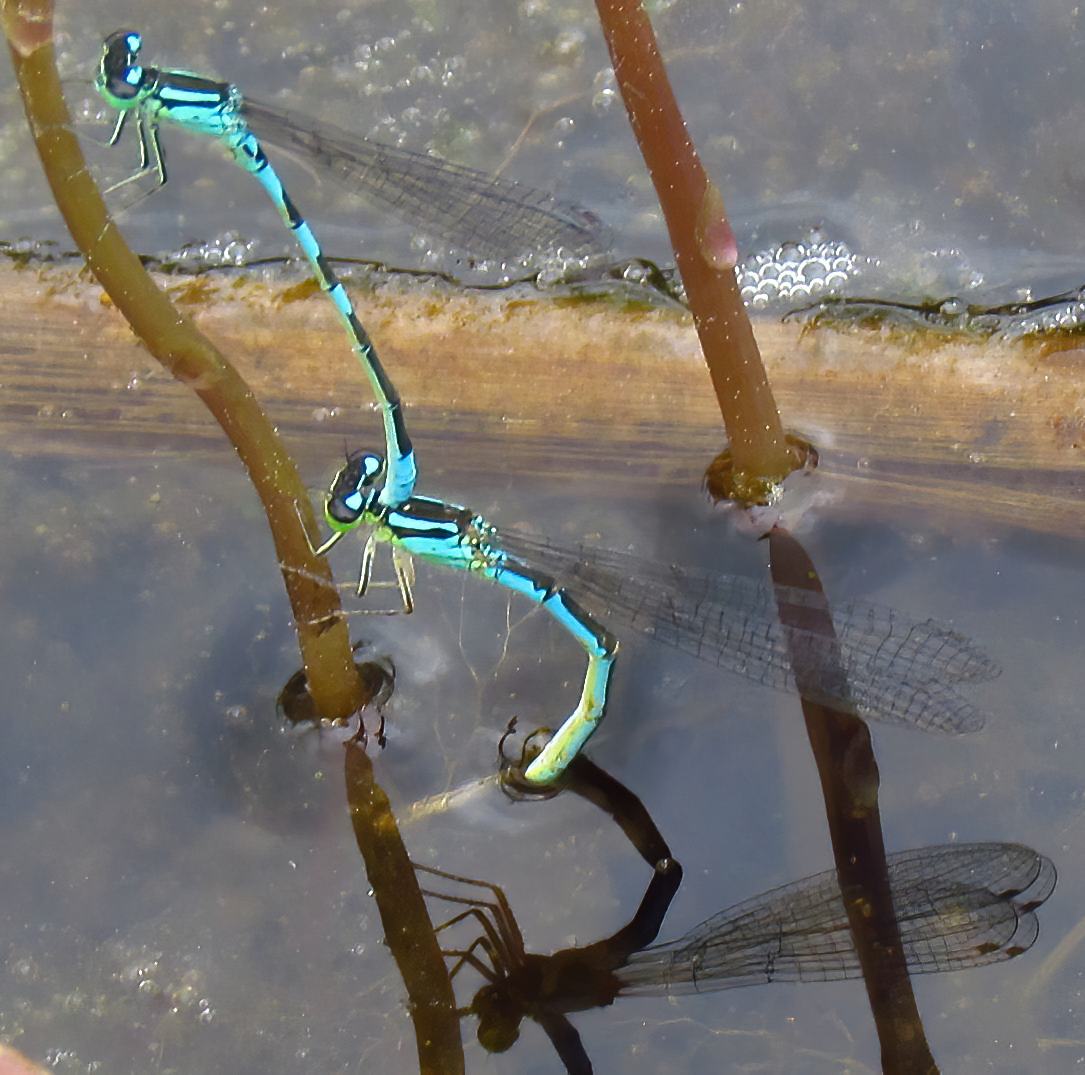
- Laying eggs

Scientific classification
- Kingdom: Animalia
- Phylum: Arthropoda
- Clade: Pancrustacea
- Class: Insecta
- Order: Odonata
- Suborder: Zygoptera
- Family: Coenagrionidae
- Genus: Coenagrion
- Species: C. resolutum

Binomial name
- Coenagrion resolutum (Hagen in Selys, 1876)

= Coenagrion resolutum =

Species of damselfly

Coenagrion resolutum, the taiga bluet, is a damselfly which is part of the family of Coenagrionidae found in North America.

== Description ==
The male is blue with black markings on the top of the abdomen and greenish sides on the thorax. The black markings are half length on segments 3 to 5. The females are greenish blue or yellowish green with black dorsal markings that are nearly contiguous on the abdomen. The wings are held behind the body. The wingspan is between 27 and 33 mm.
