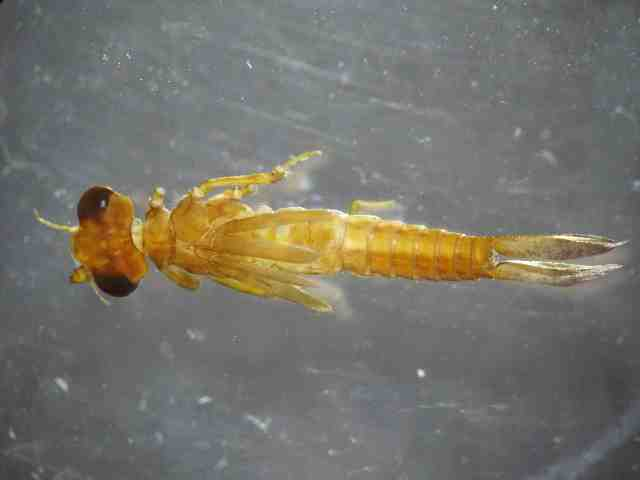

Conservation status
- Least Concern (IUCN 3.1)

Scientific classification
- Domain: Eukaryota
- Kingdom: Animalia
- Phylum: Arthropoda
- Class: Insecta
- Order: Odonata
- Suborder: Zygoptera
- Family: Coenagrionidae
- Genus: Argia
- Species: A. alberta

Binomial name
- Argia alberta Kennedy, 1918

= Argia alberta =

Species of damselfly

Argia alberta, the Paiute dancer, is a species of narrow-winged damselfly in the family Coenagrionidae. It is found in North America.

The IUCN conservation status of Argia alberta is "LC", least concern, with no immediate threat to the species' survival. The population is stable.

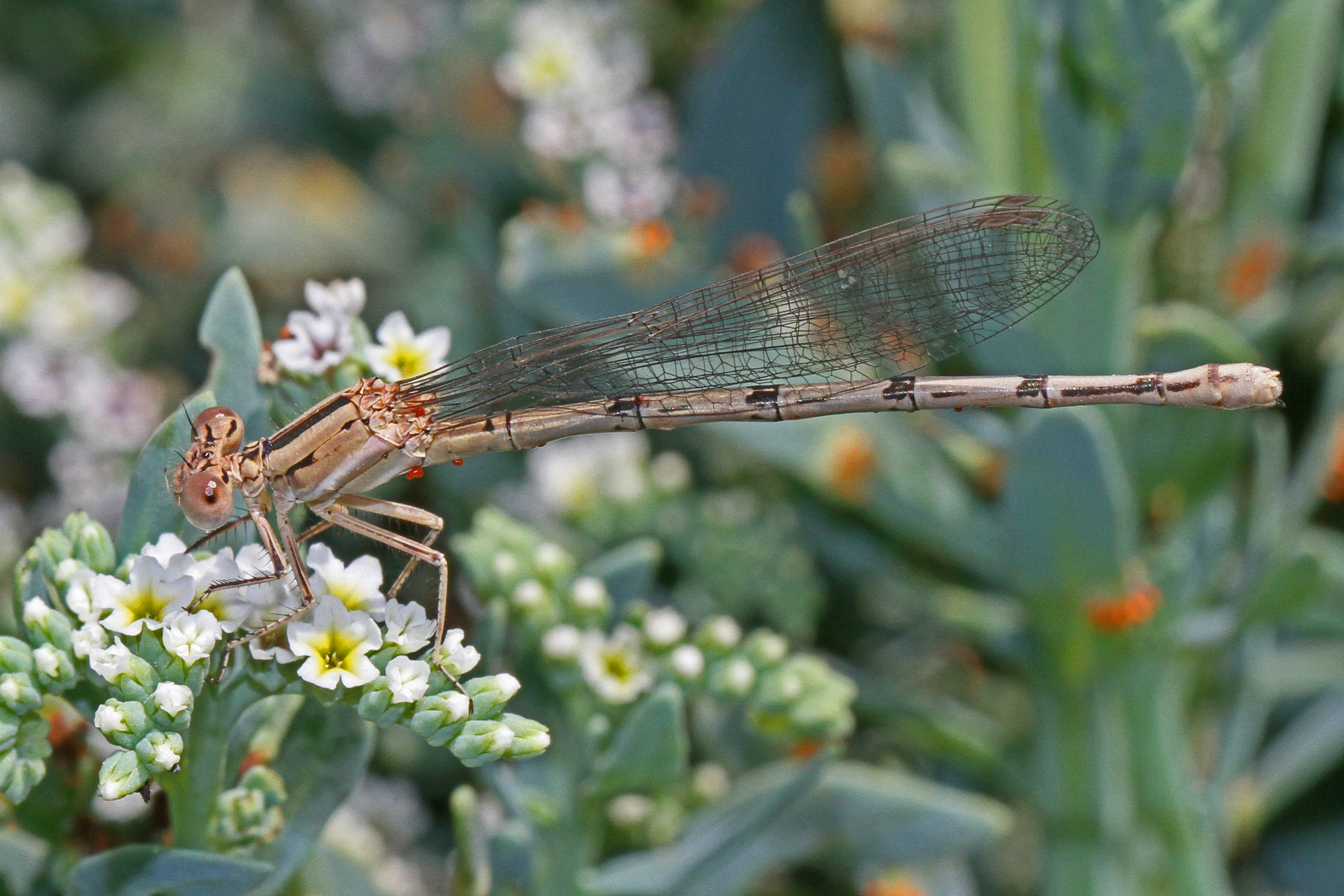
Paiute dancer, Argia alberta

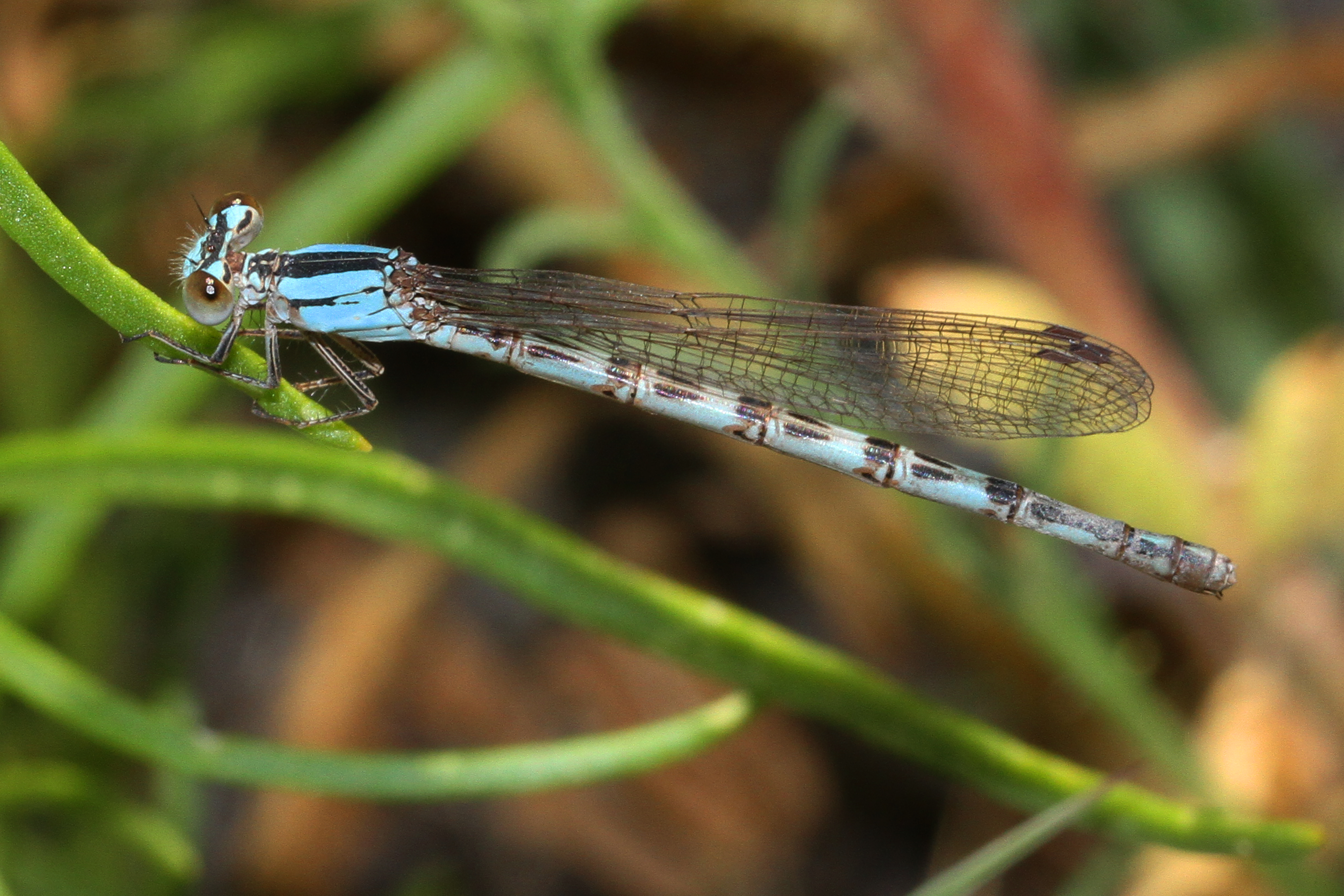
Paiute dancer, Argia alberta
