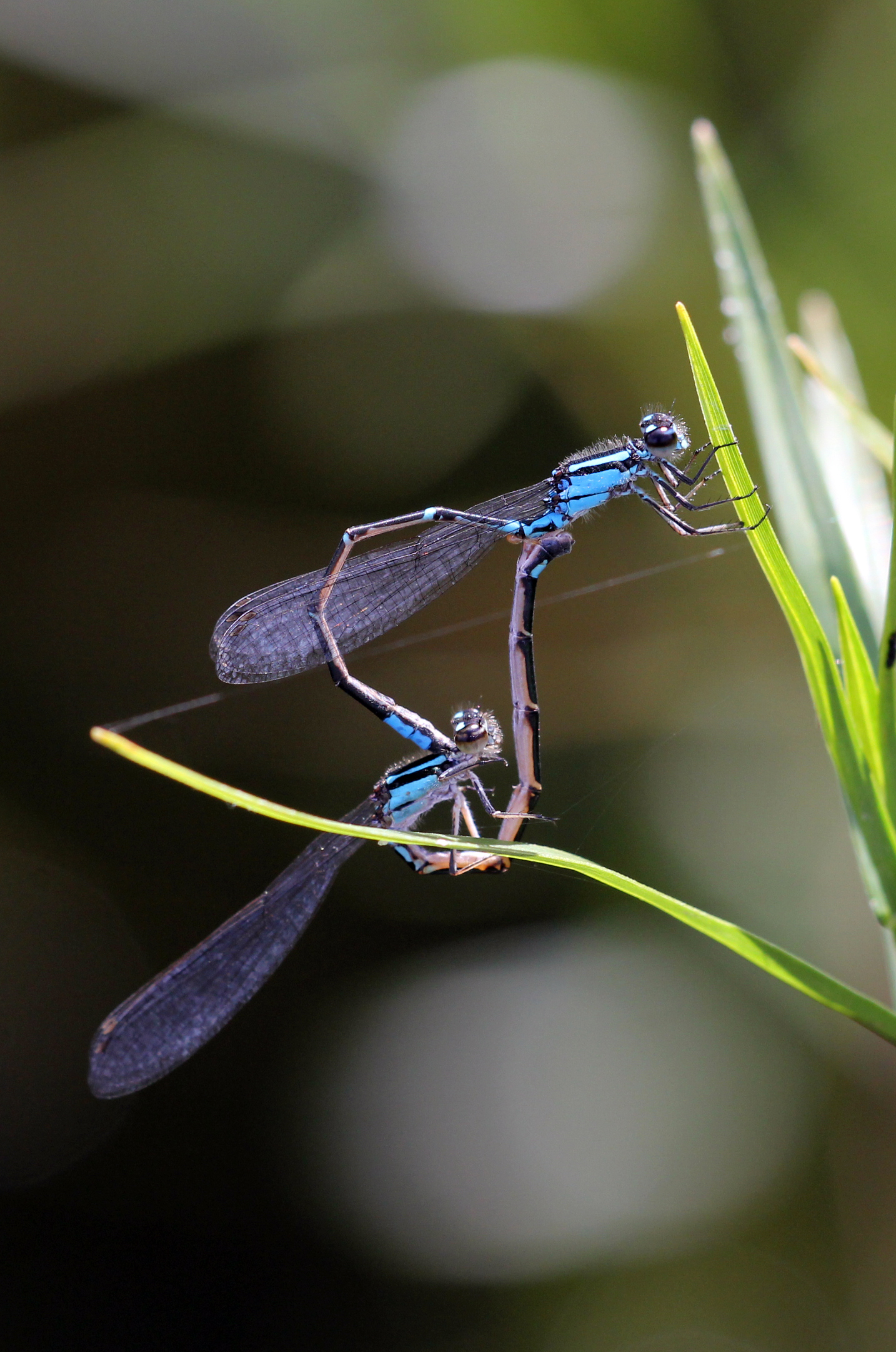

Conservation status
- Least Concern (IUCN 3.1)

Scientific classification
- Kingdom: Animalia
- Phylum: Arthropoda
- Class: Insecta
- Order: Odonata
- Suborder: Zygoptera
- Family: Coenagrionidae
- Genus: Enallagma
- Species: E. geminatum

Binomial name
- Enallagma geminatum Kellicott, 1895

= Enallagma geminatum =

Species of damselfly

Enallagma geminatum, the skimming bluet, is a species of narrow-winged damselfly in the family Coenagrionidae. It is found in North America.

The IUCN conservation status of Enallagma geminatum is "LC", least concern, with no immediate threat to the species' survival. The population is stable.

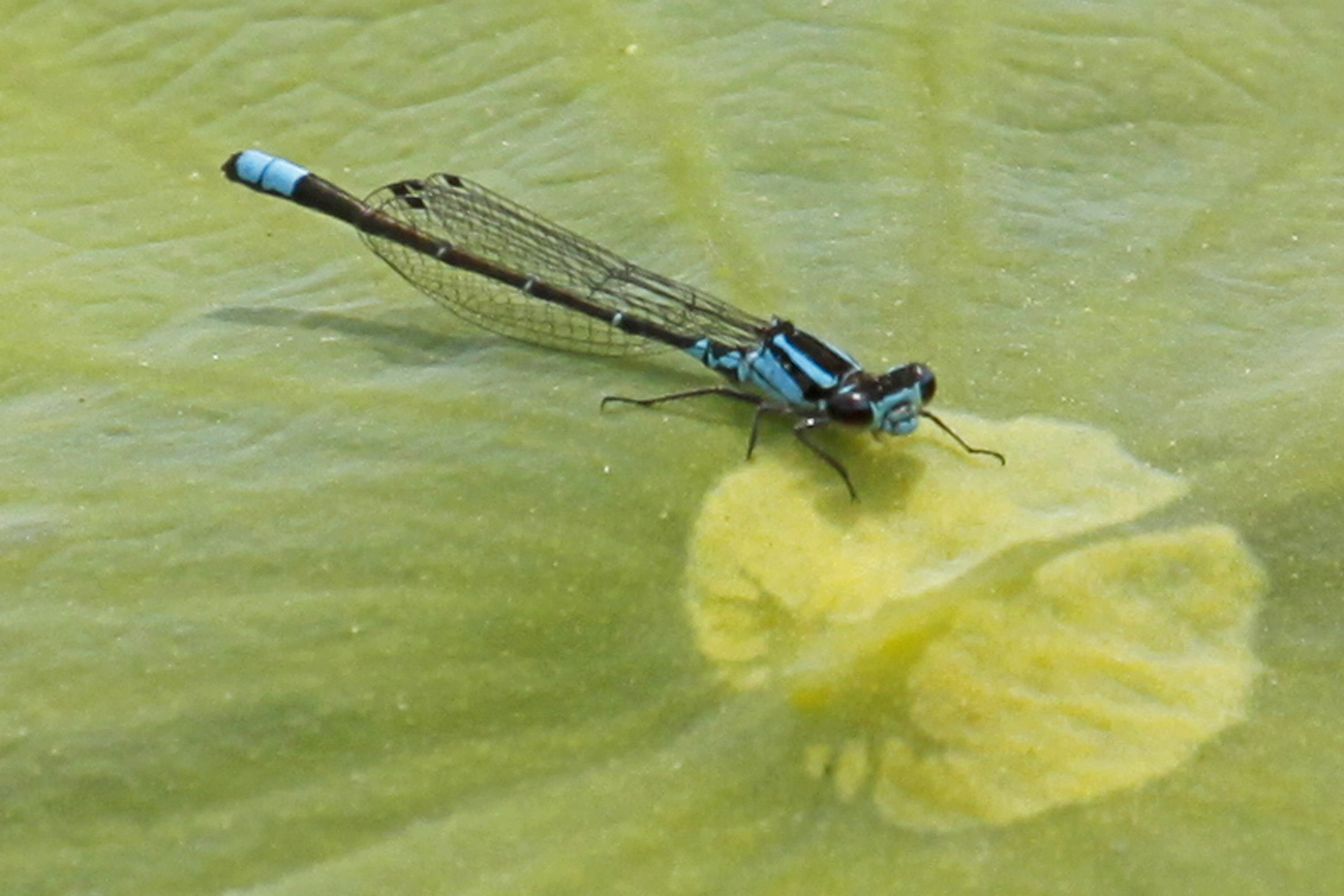
Skimming bluet, Enallagma geminatum
