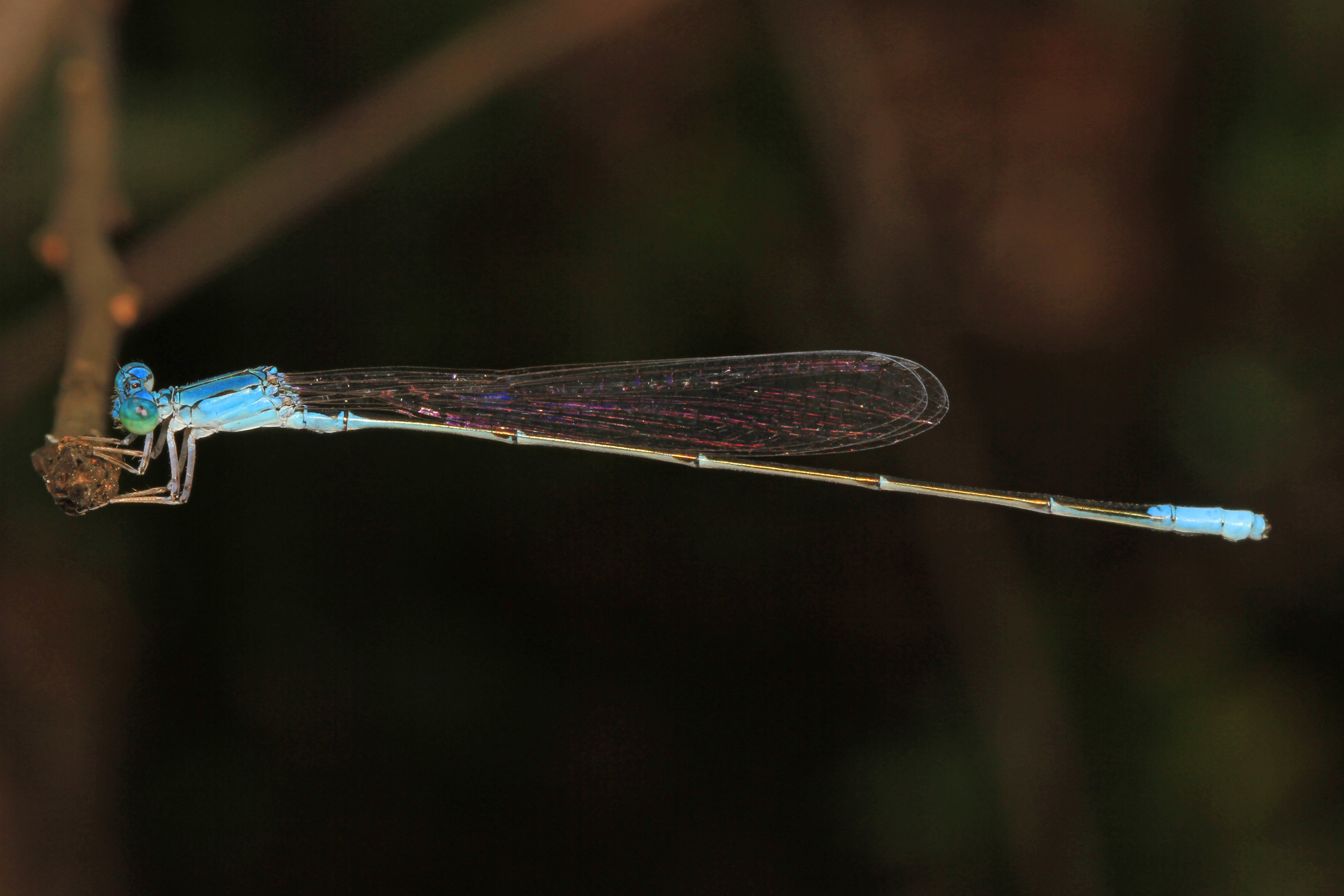

Conservation status
- Least Concern (IUCN 3.1)

Scientific classification
- Kingdom: Animalia
- Phylum: Arthropoda
- Class: Insecta
- Order: Odonata
- Suborder: Zygoptera
- Family: Coenagrionidae
- Genus: Enallagma
- Species: E. daeckii

Binomial name
- Enallagma daeckii (Calvert, 1903)

Synonyms
- Telagrion daeckii Calvert, 1903

= Enallagma daeckii =

Species of damselfly

Enallagma daeckii, the attenuated bluet, is a species of narrow-winged damselfly in the family Coenagrionidae. It is endemic to the Eastern United States.

The IUCN conservation status of Enallagma daeckii is "least concern", with no immediate threat to the species' survival. The population is stable.
