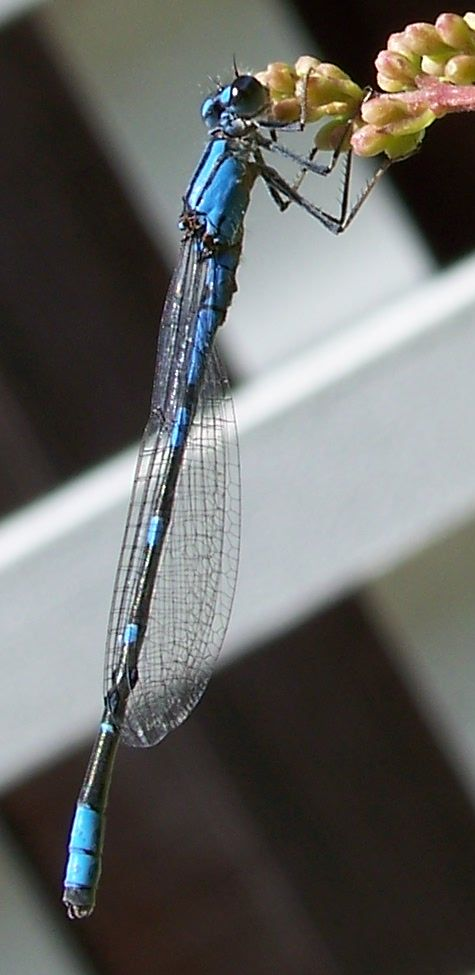

Conservation status
- Least Concern (IUCN 3.1)

Scientific classification
- Kingdom: Animalia
- Phylum: Arthropoda
- Class: Insecta
- Order: Odonata
- Suborder: Zygoptera
- Family: Coenagrionidae
- Genus: Enallagma
- Species: E. carunculatum

Binomial name
- Enallagma carunculatum Morse, 1895

= Tule bluet =

Species of damselfly

The tule bluet (Enallagma carunculatum) is a species of damselfly in the family Coenagrionidae found in North America, from northern Mexico to southern Canada.

== Identification ==
The damselfly has a blue and black abdomen, usually with more black than blue. The black humeral stripes are about a half the width of the blue antehumerals. The tule bluet postocular spots are small and triangular; they are separated by a thin occipital bar.

== Size ==
This bluet is 27–37 mm (1.1–1.5 in) long.

== Distribution ==
The tule bluet is found throughout North America from southern Canada to northern Mexico, excluding the southeastern United States.

== Habitat ==
The following is the list of habitats of the tule bluet.

- rivers
- lakes
- ponds
- marshes
- bogs

They occur where there are bulrushes around.

== Flight season ==
Mid-May to mid-September. It can also be during early July to mid-October.

== Diet ==
- Nymphs: nymphs eat a large variety of aquatic insects, they include mosquito larvae, mayfly larvae, and other aquatic insect larvae.
- Adults: adult tule bluet feed on a wide variety small flying insects, mayflies, flies, small moths, and mosquitoes. They sometimes pick up small insects from plants like aphids.

== Ecology ==
The tule bluet is found almost always where there are extensive stands of tules. This is how this bluet gets its common name. The damselfly will emerge from relatively deep water if there are bulrushes nearby. The tule bluet can be also found in alkaline or salty water.

== Reproduction ==
The male damselflies set up territories at choice breeding sites. After males and females have mated, the male stays attached to the female, as she oviposits in the stems of bulrushes. They are in their tandem position.

== Conservation ==
The populations of the tule bluet are widespeard, abundant, and secure.
