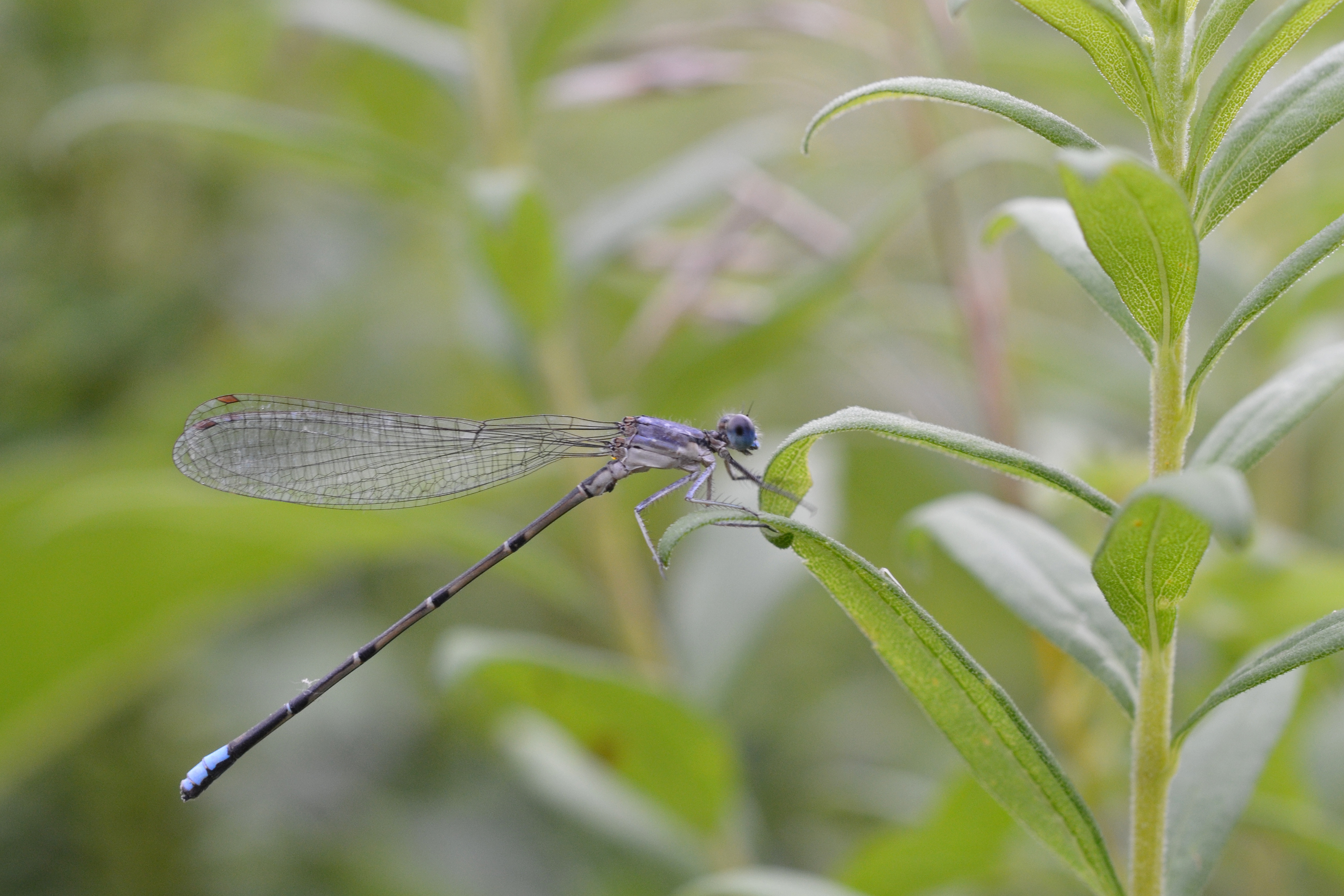
- Male
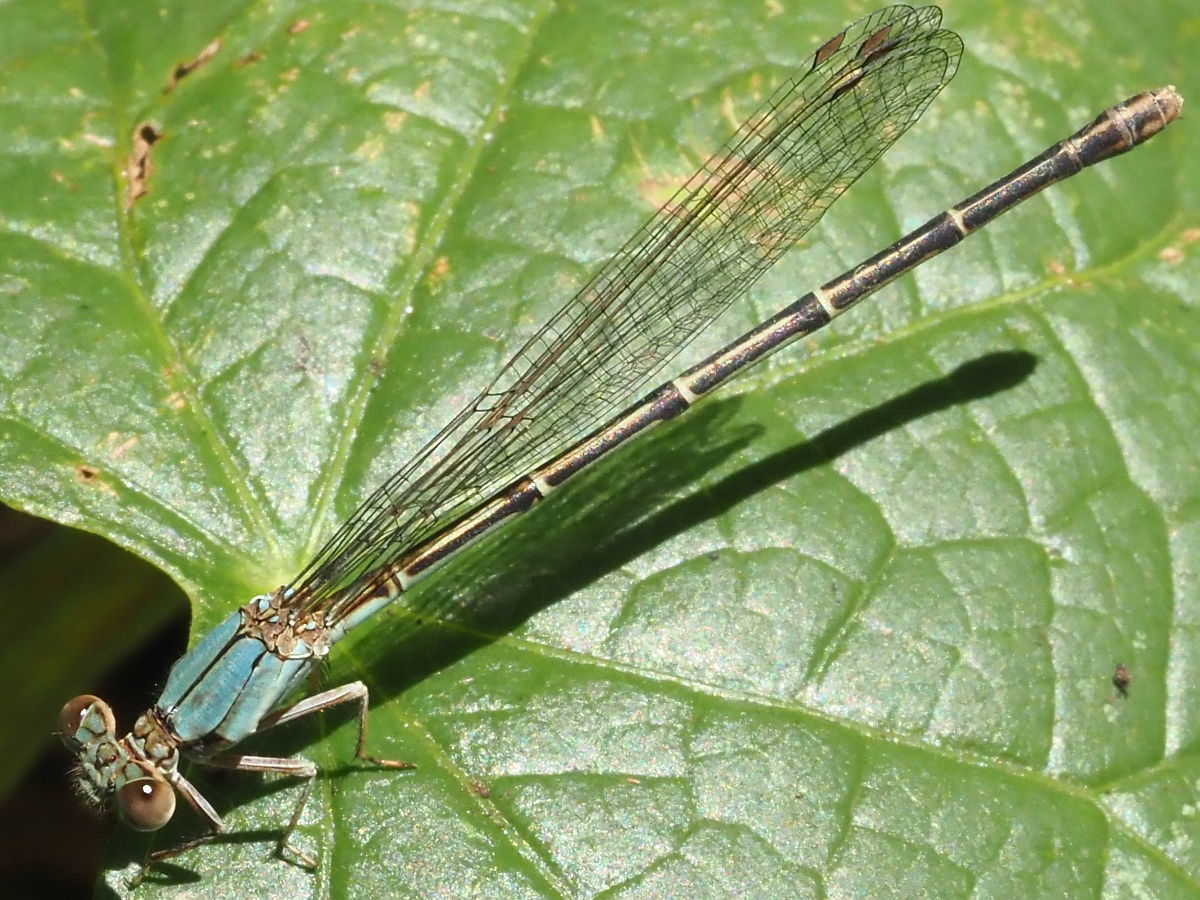
- Female

Conservation status
- Least Concern (IUCN 3.1)

Scientific classification
- Kingdom: Animalia
- Phylum: Arthropoda
- Class: Insecta
- Order: Odonata
- Suborder: Zygoptera
- Family: Coenagrionidae
- Genus: Argia
- Species: A. apicalis

Binomial name
- Argia apicalis Say, 1840

= Blue-fronted dancer =

Species of damselfly

The blue-fronted dancer (Argia apicalis) is a species of damselfly in the family Coenagrionidae, native to parts of North America. It was first described by the American zoologist Thomas Say in 1840. It is a common species with a wide range and the International Union for Conservation of Nature has assessed its conservation status as being of "least concern".

== Description ==
This damselfly ranges in length between about 33 and 40 mm (1.3 and 1.6 in). Most males have a blue thorax, the plates being separated by a few black lines, and also have a color-tipped abdomen, segments eight, nine and ten being bright blue. The remaining segments are dark brown. However the color of the thorax of Argia apicalis is variable and some males can be greyish-black rather than blue. They can change from one phase to the other and back again over the course of several days, with several intervening variations on the way; neither color phase seems to be particularly related to age or sexual maturity.

Females exhibit three thoracic color phases: brown, turquoise and grayish-black. Again the phase change often takes place in steps, and none of the phases seems to be associated with a particular age or state of maturity.

== Distribution ==
Argia apicalis has a wide distribution in North America, its range extending from Ontario in Canada, across the United States except for the extreme southwest, to the state of Nuevo León in Mexico. It inhabits a range of habitats including near large and small rivers, streams, lakes and ponds, but is most common in the vicinity of large, muddy rivers. Though it is usually found in woodland, it also occurs in treeless areas.

== Behavior ==
Adults are on the wing from mid-summer onwards. Males often patrol small territories over water but females only visit water when ready to mate. Copulation soon follows the arrival of the female, and the pair flies around the pond in tandem, investigating sites for egg-laying. The female begins ovipositing while still linked to the male and often continues to lay after he has flown off. The eggs are laid in mats of willow roots, among floating driftwood, on bits of floating board and on living, but horizontal, Helenium stems. By this time, the male is no longer aggressive towards other males, and several females use the same sites for egg deposition.

This species has been much studied, and its behavior is fairly typical of damselfly behavior. The adults hatched over an extended period and first appeared at a study site in Oklahoma in mid-summer. Males visited water on about 40% of their adult days while females merely did so on 20%, both spending the rest of the time elsewhere, mostly in woods. The males arrived at water earlier in the day than females and start patrolling areas, stationing themselves about 2 metres (6 ft) from adjoining males. They darted at invaders and successfully drove them off in most instances although no physical contact occurred. Peak activity was around midday. The arrival of a female in the patrolled territory was greeted with immediate copulation lasting about 16 minutes, with no preliminary display or courtship. There followed a phase of 25 minutes while they explored the pond, an ovipositing phase with the pair in tandem lasting about 60 minutes followed by a further 20 minute egg-laying period by the female alone. Females avoided further sexual activity by flying rapidly away. Marked males had an apparent life expectancy of about 8 days and females 7, though the oldest marked male lived for 33 days. By late afternoon, all the damselflies had departed.

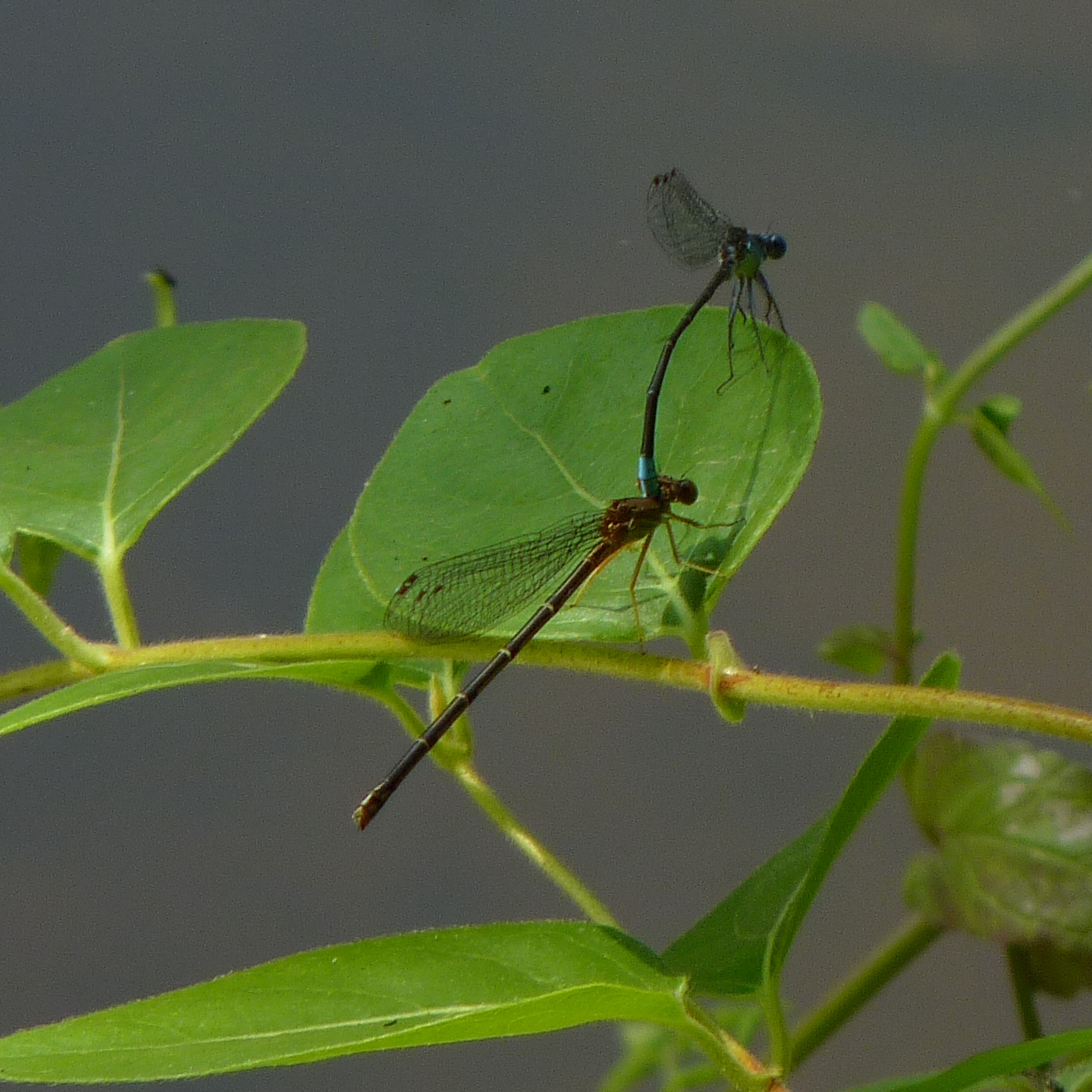
In tandem

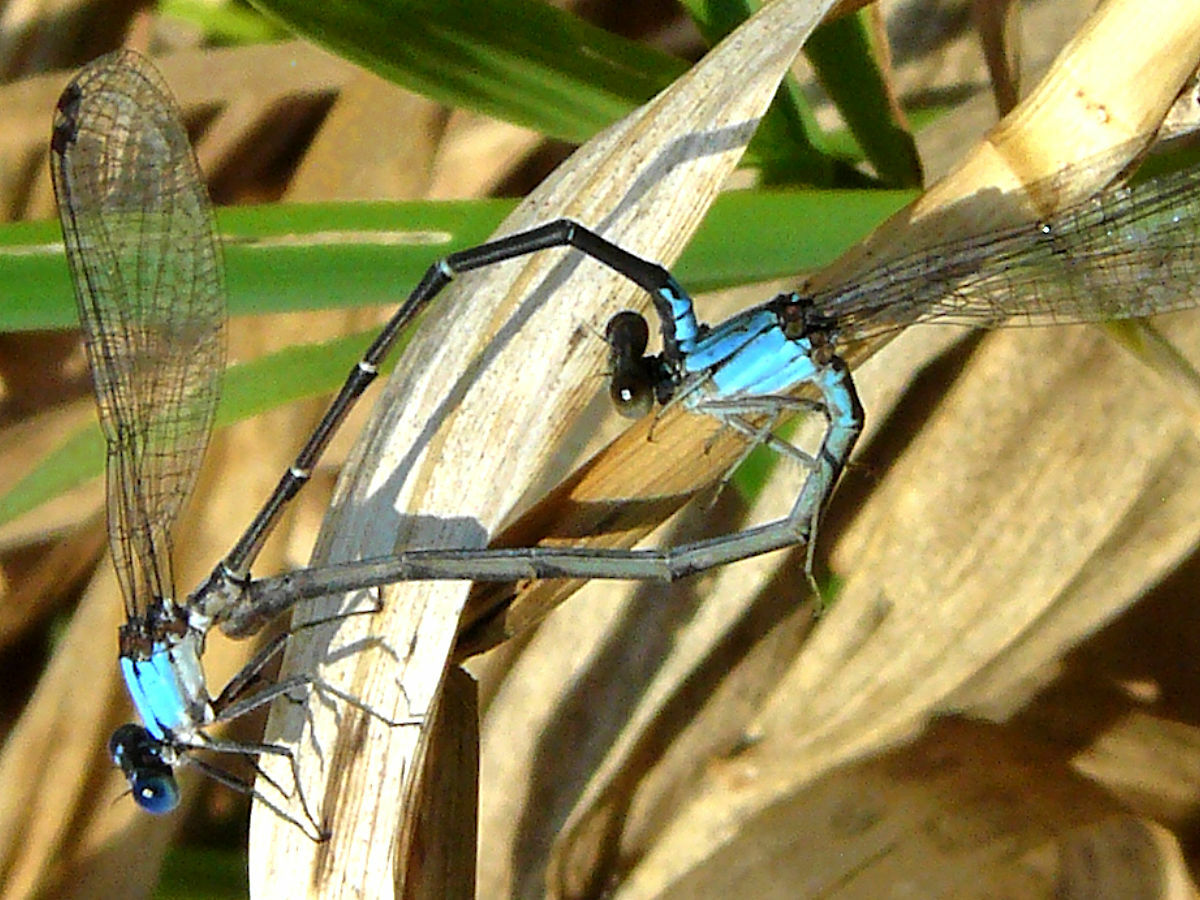
Mating wheel
