= Enallagma annexum =

Northern bluet
- Male
- Female

Conservation status
- Least Concern (IUCN 3.1)

Scientific classification
- Kingdom: Animalia
- Phylum: Arthropoda
- Clade: Pancrustacea
- Class: Insecta
- Order: Odonata
- Suborder: Zygoptera
- Family: Coenagrionidae
- Genus: Enallagma
- Species: E. annexum

Binomial name
- Enallagma annexum (Hagen, 1861)

Species of damselfly

Enallagma annexum, the northern bluet, is a species of damselfly in the family Coenagrionidae. Enallagma annexum was formerly included with Enallagma cyathigerum.

== Identification ==
The northern bluet is a small damselfly with a length of 1 to 1.6 inches (26 to 40 mm) long. The male is predominantly blue on the sides of its thorax, and the upper side of its abdomen. Its lower abdominal appendages are longer than its upper appendages. The female's body is greenish-yellow to brown color. The upper side of its abdomen is mostly black.

teneral female

mating

== Flight season ==
Northern bluets have a flight season of early May to July.

== Similar species ==
Many species in the genus Enallagma look similar to each other. The northern bluet looks similar to many bluet species. They include the boreal bluet, familiar bluet, Hagen's bluet, marsh bluet, and vernal bluet. It can be distinguished from familiar bluet by the large postocular spots and the shorter cerci. The characteristics shared by northern and boreal bluets are their large eyespots, and a mushroom-shaped black spot on abdominal segment S2. Its best seen dorsally.
