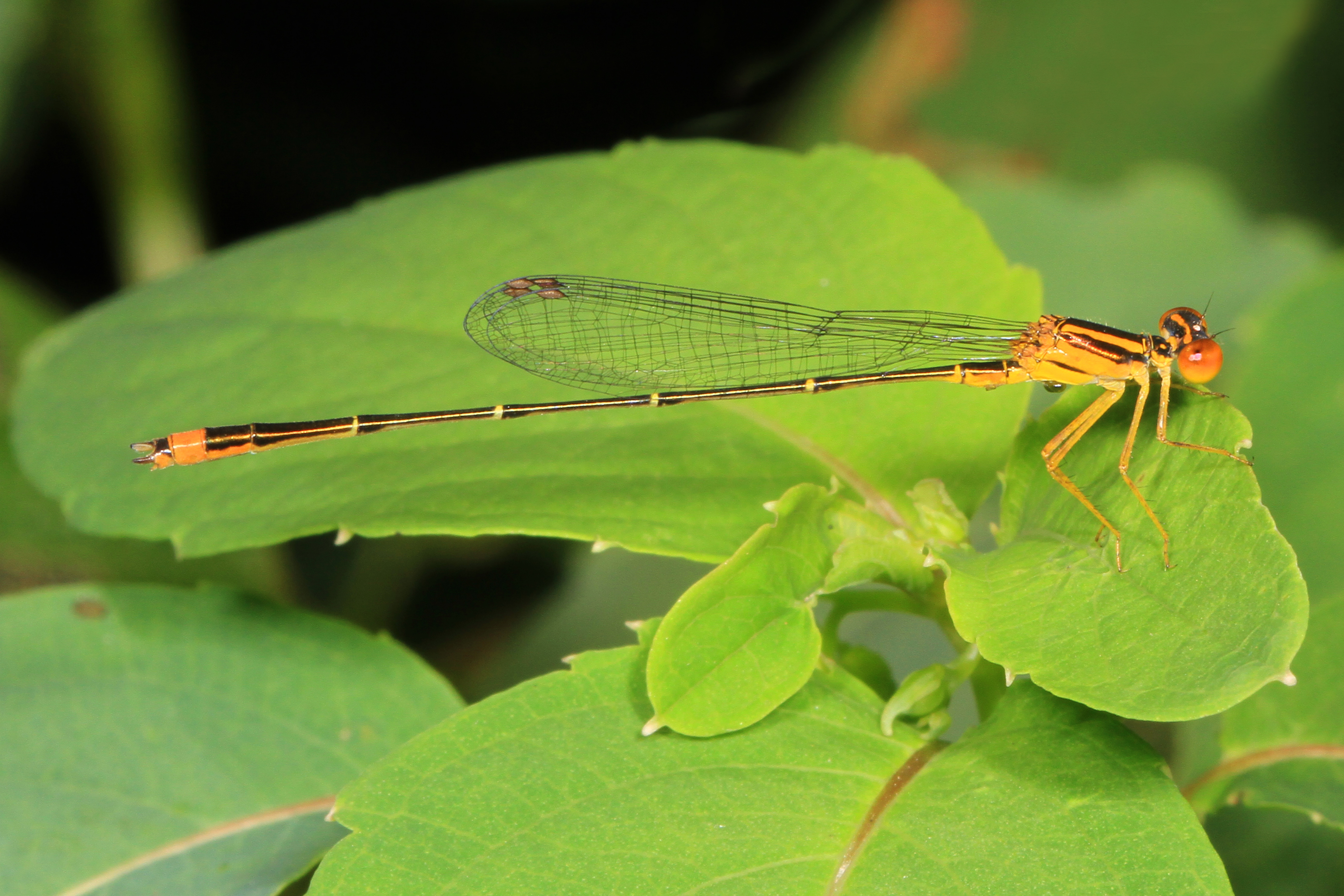

Conservation status
- Least Concern (IUCN 3.1)

Scientific classification
- Kingdom: Animalia
- Phylum: Arthropoda
- Clade: Pancrustacea
- Class: Insecta
- Order: Odonata
- Suborder: Zygoptera
- Family: Coenagrionidae
- Genus: Enallagma
- Species: E. signatum

Binomial name
- Enallagma signatum (Hagen, 1861)

= Orange bluet =

Species of damselfly

The orange bluet (Enallagma signatum) is a species of damselfly in the family Coenagrionidae.

== Identification ==
This species of bluet stands out from many other bluets because of its orange color. On male orange bluets, the thorax is orange with a thick, black stipe along the back and black shoulder stripes. His abdomen is mostly black with some orange rings, orange below, and orange near the tip. His large eyes are orange on a black head; small orange postocular spots are connected across the back of the head by an orange bar. On female orange bluets, the thorax is similar looking to the male thorax only the color is dull yellow instead of orange. Her abdomen is mostly black above and dull yellow below. Her large eyes are yellow-brown with small yellow postocular spots connected by a thin, yellow bar. The female can also be one of three forms. The first remains blue throughout life, one becomes green and the third becomes orange.

== Habitat ==
This bluet is often found near streams, ponds, pools with still waters, slow moving streams, and rivers.

== Distribution ==
- Mexico: Tamaulipas
- United States: (Colorado • Georgia • Massachusetts • New Jersey • Ohio • Vermont)
- Canada: (New Brunswick)

== Size ==
The orange bluet is small with an average length of 1 to 1.5 inches (25–38 mm). Its hindwing is 15–21 mm long.

== Diet ==
Orange bluets feed on insects. Their flight pattern is slow, moving in and out of emergent vegetation.

== Habits ==
The orange bluet may perch on rock, foliage, water lilies, other emergent vegetation, and on the bare ground along the shore with wings together.

== Similar species ==
Orange bluets are similar to cherry, burgundy, and scarlet bluets. All three bluets are red not orange. General vesper bluets are similar, but the black humeral stripe is either lacking or narrowly reduced in that species. Threadtail damselflies are orange and are found alongside the orange bluet, but they will have much longer and thinner abdomens. Their abdomens are twice as long as the length of their wings. It also looks similar to the Florida bluet which is orange in color, but males have shorter and stubbier cerci.

== Reproduction ==
Orange bluet females will posture their unwillingness to mate. Females stay a distance from the water and are often not encountered except in copula or tandem. After mating, the pairs will begin laying eggs in floating vegetation or debris, with the male often accompanying his partner underwater. The female will remain underwater, ovipositing in the traditional manner for up to 20 minutes at a time.

== Flight Season ==
The orange bluet has a long flight season. It is from early March to early November. This bluet is unusual in that it is most active in the late afternoon.
