= Hispania (disambiguation) =

Hispania is the ancient Roman name for the Iberian Peninsula (comprising modern Portugal and Spain).

Hispania may also refer to:

== Places ==
- Hispania or Iberia
  - Hispania Citerior, Republican Roman province
  - Hispania Ulterior, Republican Roman province
  - Hispania Baetica, Imperial Roman province
  - Hispania Lusitania, Imperial Roman province
  - Hispania Tarraconensis, Imperial Roman province
  - Hispania Balearica, a latter Imperial Roman province
  - Hispania Carthaginiensis, a latter Imperial Roman province
  - Hispania Gallaecia, a latter Imperial Roman province
  - Hispania Nova (disambiguation), a latter designation of two Imperial Roman provinces and a Latinate name for colonial Mexico
  - Marca Hispanica, buffer zone (795) between the Umayyad Al-Andalus and the Frankish Kingdom
- Hispania, Antioquia, town and municipality in Antioquia, Colombia
- Hispania, known as Capital mundial de Hispania, 1927 proposed Spanish new capital city replacing Madrid

== People ==
- Trajan, Roman Emperor (53-117)
- Hadrian, Roman Emperor (76-138)
- Theodosius I, Roman Emperor (379-395)
- Seneca the Younger, Roman philosopher and playwright, tutor and advisor of Nero (1BC-65AD)
- Seneca the Elder, Roman rhetorician and writer (54BC-39AD)
- Hosius of Corduba. Bishop of Corduba (257-359)
- Maximus of Hispania, Roman usurper (409-411)

== Other ==
- Allegory of Hispania, the national personification of Spain
- Hispania (journal), the journal of the American Association of Teachers of Spanish and Portuguese
- Hispania, revista española de historia, published in Spain by the Consejo Superior de Investigaciones Científicas
- Hispania Clásica, classical music concert promotion agency active in Europe and in the Americas
- Hispano-Suiza, a car manufacturer
- 804 Hispania, minor planet orbiting the Sun
- MV Ancona, a ferry operated by Swedish Lloyd 1969–1972 under the name MV Hispania
- SS Hispania, a number of steamships carried this name
- Hispania Líneas Aéreas, a defunct Spanish charter airline from 1982-1989.
- Hispania Racing F1 Team, a Formula One team that debuted in the 2010 Formula One season

== Derivations ==
- Hispanic, the linguistic group of Spanish speakers
- Hispaniola, original Spanish name for the island presently occupied by Haiti and the Dominican Republic

== See also ==
- Iberia (disambiguation)
- Roman conquest of Hispania
- Umayyad conquest of Hispania
