= Northern bluet =

Northern bluet is a common name for several damselflies and may refer to:

- Enallagma annexum, native to North America
- Enallagma cyathigerum, native to Europe
