= Azure bluet =

Azure bluet may refer to:

- Houstonia caerulea, a North American plant
- Enallagma aspersum, a North American damselfly
- Azure damselfly, a European damselfly
