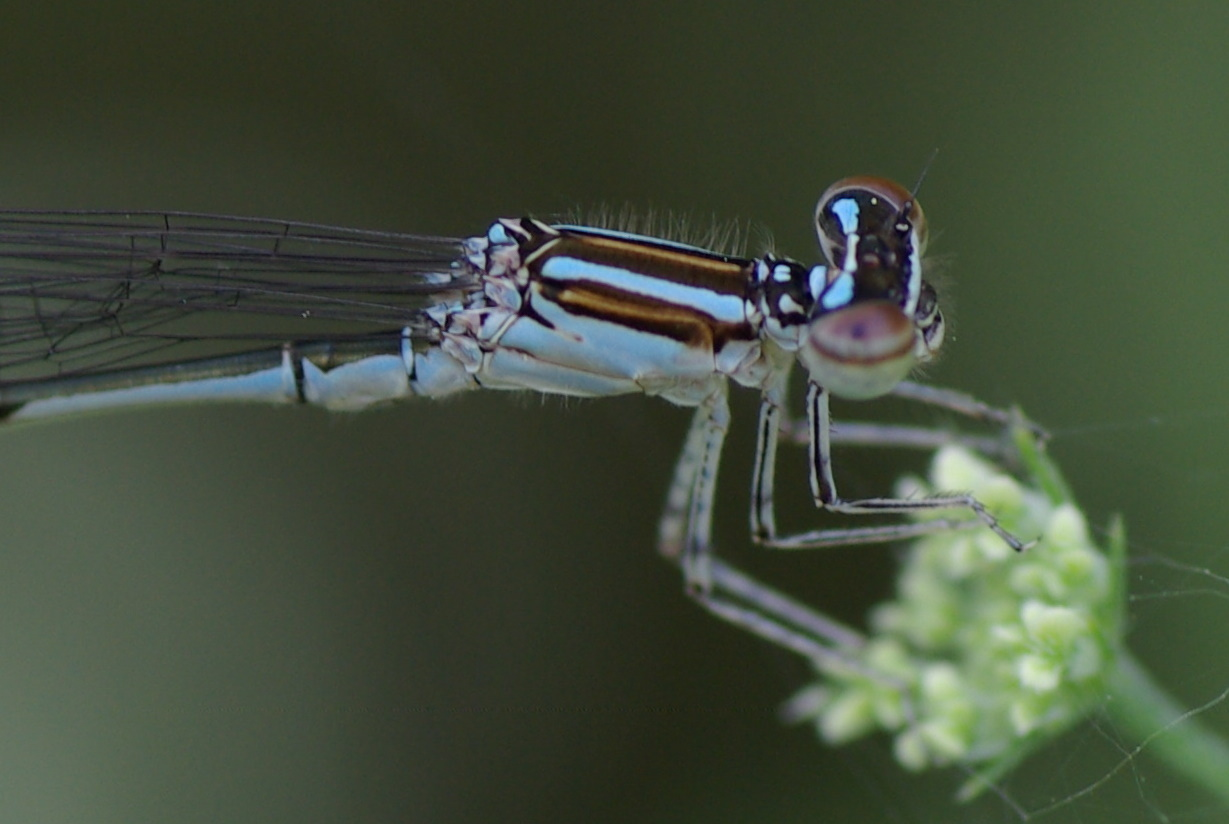

Conservation status
- Least Concern (IUCN 3.1)

Scientific classification
- Kingdom: Animalia
- Phylum: Arthropoda
- Class: Insecta
- Order: Odonata
- Suborder: Zygoptera
- Family: Coenagrionidae
- Genus: Enallagma
- Species: E. exsulans

Binomial name
- Enallagma exsulans (Hagen, 1861)

= Stream bluet =

Species of damselfly

The stream bluet (Enallagma exsulans) is a species of American bluet damselflies in the family Coenagrionidae. Its length is 29–37 mm. Many bluet species prefer ponds and lakes; the stream bluet as its name implies is most at home along moving waters. It can be found along small to medium-sized rivers. It is occasionally found at lakes too. In many species of damselflies the males have a blue tip to the abdomen. Enallagma exsulans is one of those less common cases where the female, too, has a blue abdominal tip. Summertime is the best time to look for stream bluets.

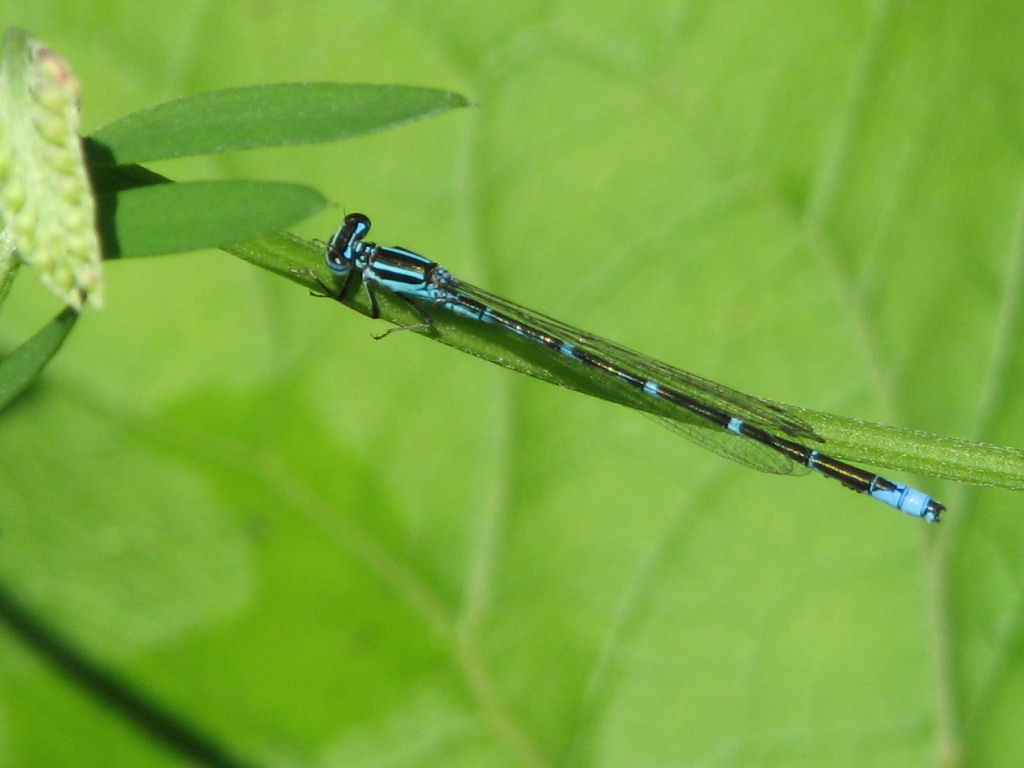
Taken in Ottawa, Ontario, Canada

== Distribution ==
- United States: (Alabama • Arkansas • Colorado • Connecticut • Delaware • Florida • Georgia • Iowa • Illinois • Indiana • Kansas • Kentucky • Louisiana • Massachusetts • Maryland • Maine • Michigan • Minnesota • Mississippi • Nebraska • North Carolina • New Hampshire • New Jersey • Ohio • Pennsylvania • Rhode Island • South Carolina • Tennessee • Texas • Vermont • Wisconsin • West Virginia)
- Canada: (Manitoba • New Brunswick • Ontario • Quebec)

== Similar species ==
Stream bluets look similar to turquoise bluets.
