= Enallagma sulcatum =

Conservation status
- Least Concern (IUCN 3.1)

Scientific classification
- Kingdom: Animalia
- Phylum: Arthropoda
- Class: Insecta
- Order: Odonata
- Suborder: Zygoptera
- Family: Coenagrionidae
- Genus: Enallagma
- Species: E. sulcatum

Binomial name
- Enallagma sulcatum Williamson, 1922

Species of damselfly

Enallagma sulcatum, the golden bluet, is a species of narrow-winged damselfly in the family Coenagrionidae. It is endemic to the Southeastern United States.

The IUCN conservation status of Enallagma sulcatum is "least concern", with no immediate threat to the species' survival. The population is stable.
