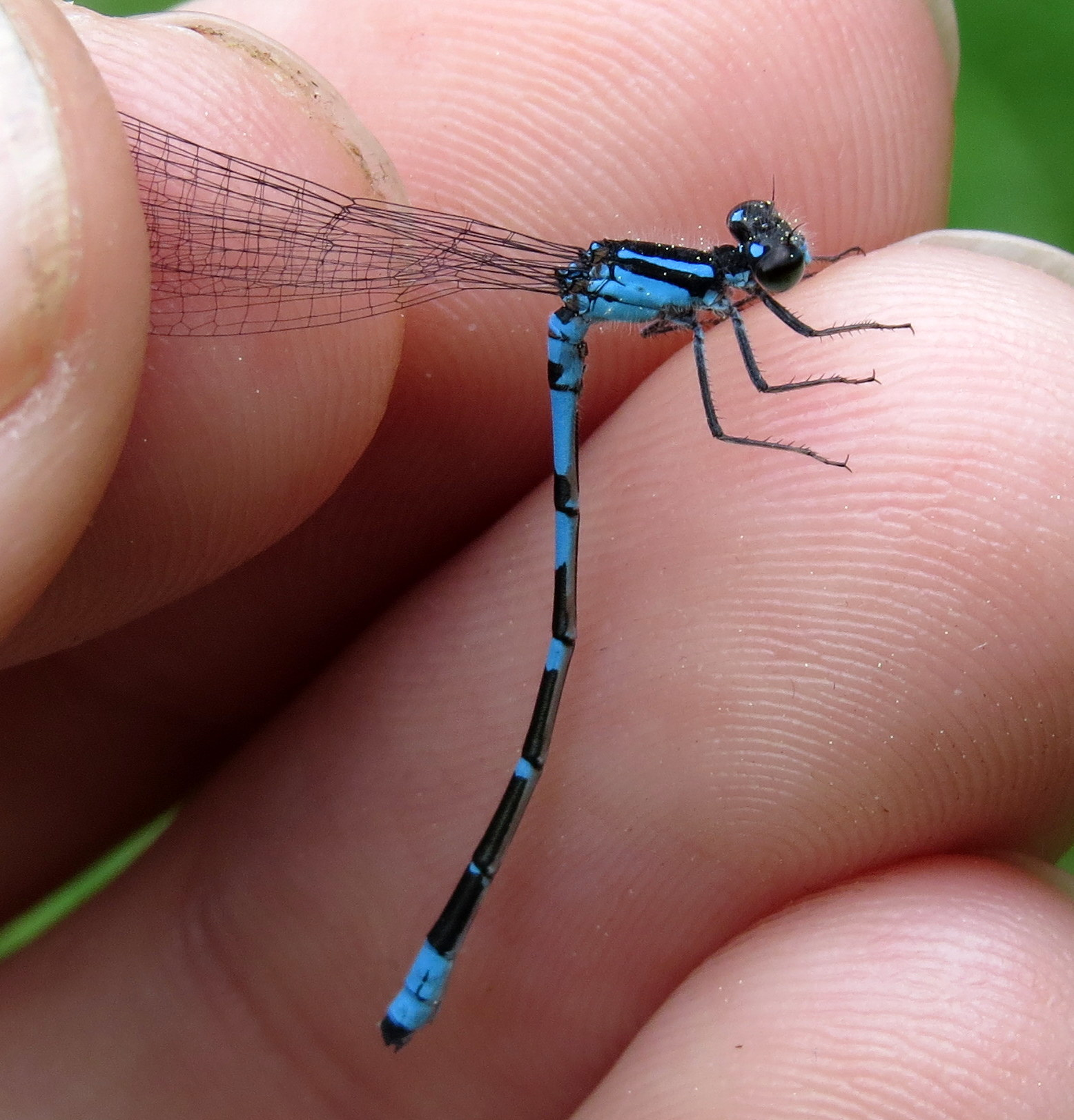
- A Pine Barrens Bluet is held by the wings for inspection

Conservation status
- Least Concern (IUCN 3.1)

Scientific classification
- Kingdom: Animalia
- Phylum: Arthropoda
- Class: Insecta
- Order: Odonata
- Suborder: Zygoptera
- Family: Coenagrionidae
- Genus: Enallagma
- Species: E. recurvatum

Binomial name
- Enallagma recurvatum Davis, 1913

= Enallagma recurvatum =

Species of damselfly

Enallagma recurvatum, the pine barrens bluet, is a species of damselfly in the family Coenagrionidae. It is endemic to the United States. Its natural habitat is freshwater lakes. It is threatened by habitat loss.
