= Enallagma truncatum =

Conservation status
- Vulnerable (IUCN 3.1)

Scientific classification
- Kingdom: Animalia
- Phylum: Arthropoda
- Class: Insecta
- Order: Odonata
- Suborder: Zygoptera
- Family: Coenagrionidae
- Genus: Enallagma
- Species: E. truncatum

Binomial name
- Enallagma truncatum (Gundlach, 1888)

Species of damselfly

Enallagma truncatum is a species of damselfly in the family Coenagrionidae. It is endemic to Cuba. Its natural habitats are intermittent freshwater lakes and freshwater marshes. It is threatened by habitat loss.
