= Hispania Nova =

Hispania Nova (Latin for "New Hispania") can mean:

- Two Roman provinces
  - Hispania Nova Citerior Antoniniana ("New Hither Hispania of Antoninus"), established by Caracalla from a short time after 211 over the Gallaecian conventi of Bracara, Lucus and perhaps Asturica.
  - Hispania Nova Ulterior Tingitana ("New Yonder Hispania of Tangier"), the name set by Marcus Aurelius on Mauretania Tingitana when he linked it to Hispania instead of the Diocese of Africa
- A Latinate name for New Spain (i.e. Mexico) as in the scientific name of the Neotropical bluet (Enallagma novaehispaniae).
