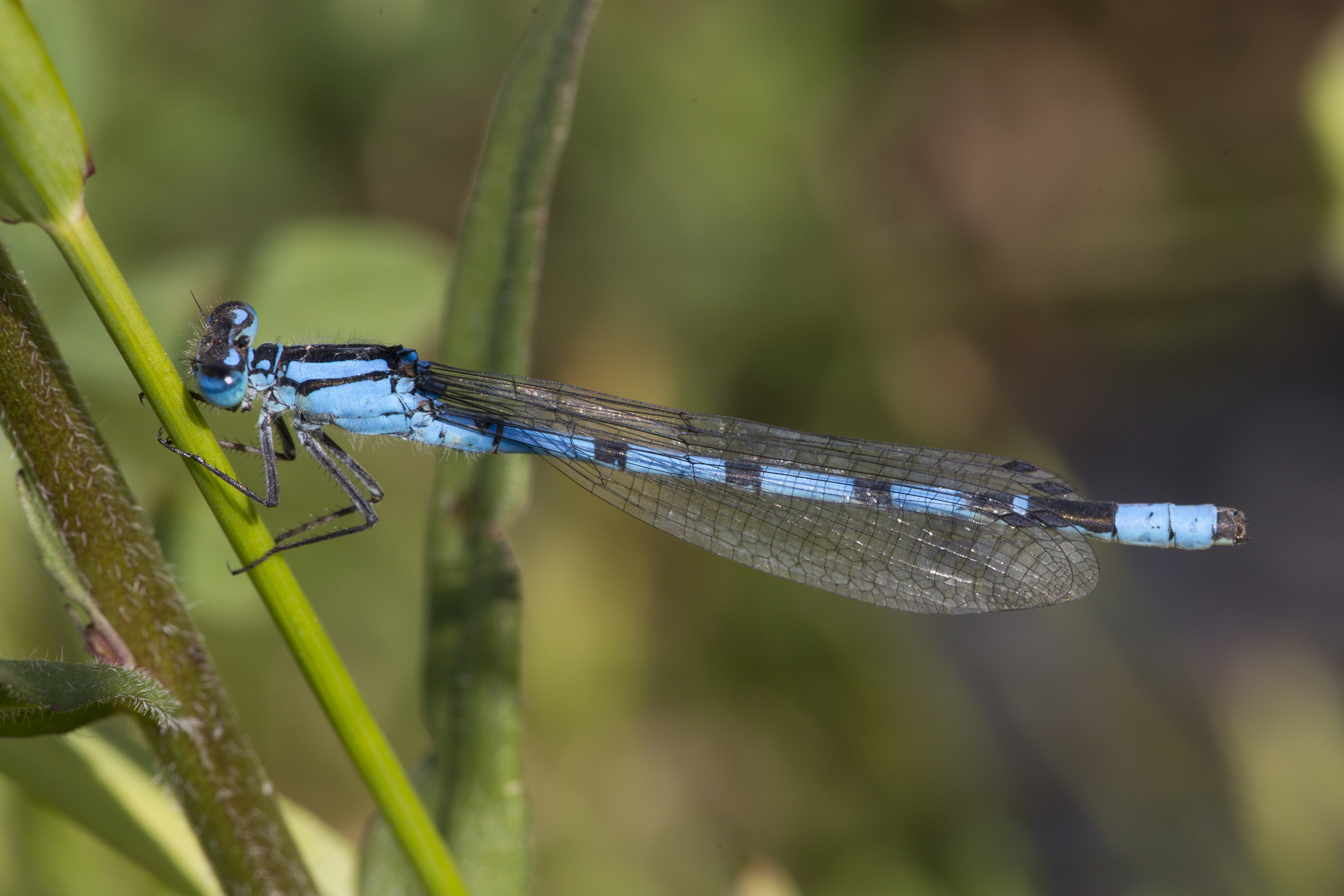
- Enallagma cyathigerum

Scientific classification
- Kingdom: Animalia
- Phylum: Arthropoda
- Class: Insecta
- Order: Odonata
- Suborder: Zygoptera
- Family: Coenagrionidae
- Genus: Enallagma; Charpentier, 1840

= Enallagma =

Genus of damselflies

Common blue damselfly, genus Enallagma, family Coenagrionidae

Enallagma is a genus of damselflies in the family Coenagrionidae commonly known as bluets.

== Description ==
Adults range in length from 28 mm to 40 mm. Males are usually bright blue and black while the coloration of females varies by species. With larval lifecycles, eggs do not diapause but hatch after a couple weeks. The larvae are found submerged often far from shore.

== Species ==
The genus consists of the following species:

- Enallagma ambiguum Navás, 1936
- Enallagma anna Williamson, 1900 – River Bluet
- Enallagma annexum (Hagen, 1861) – Northern Bluet
- Enallagma antennatum (Say, 1839) – Rainbow Bluet
- Enallagma aspersum (Hagen, 1861) – Azure Bluet
- Enallagma basidens Calvert, 1902 – Double-Striped Bluet
- Enallagma boreale Selys, 1875 – Boreal Bluet
- Enallagma cardenium (Hagen, 1861) – Purple Bluet
- Enallagma carunculatum Morse, 1895 – Tule Bluet
- Enallagma civile (Hagen, 1861) – Familiar Bluet
- Enallagma clausum Morse, 1895 – Alkali Bluet
- Enallagma concisum Williamson, 1922 – Cherry Bluet
- Enallagma cyathigerum (Charpentier, 1840) – Common Blue Damselfly
- Enallagma daeckii (Calvert, 1903) – Attenuated Bluet
- Enallagma davisi Westfall, 1943 – Sandhill Bluet
- Enallagma deserti Selys, 1871 – Desert Bluet
- Enallagma divagans Selys, 1876 – Turquoise Bluet
- Enallagma doubledayi (Selys, 1850) – Atlantic Bluet
- Enallagma dubium Root, 1924 – Burgundy Bluet
- Enallagma durum (Hagen, 1861) – Big Bluet
- Enallagma ebrium (Hagen, 1861) – Marsh Bluet
- Enallagma eiseni Calvert, 1895 – Baja California Bluet
- Enallagma exsulans (Hagen, 1861) – Stream Bluet
- Enallagma geminatum Kellicott, 1895 – Skimming Bluet
- Enallagma hageni (Walsh, 1863) – Hagen's Bluet
- Enallagma laterale Morse, 1895 – New England Bluet
- Enallagma minusculum Morse, 1895 – Little Bluet
- Enallagma novaehispaniae Calvert, 1907 – Neotropical Bluet
- Enallagma pallidum Root, 1923 – Pale Bluet
- Enallagma parvum Selys,1876
- Enallagma pictum Morse, 1895 – Scarlet Bluet
- Enallagma pollutum (Hagen, 1861) – Florida Bluet
- Enallagma praevarum (Hagen, 1861) – Arroyo Bluet
- Enallagma recurvatum Davis, 1913 – Pine Barrens Bluet
- Enallagma semicirculare Selys, 1876 – Claw-tipped Bluet
- Enallagma signatum (Hagen, 1861) – Orange Bluet
- Enallagma sulcatum Williamson, 1922 – Golden Bluet
- Enallagma traviatum Selys, 1876 – Slender Bluet
- Enallagma truncatum (Gundlach, 1888) – Cuban Bluet
- Enallagma vernale Gloyd, 1943 – Vernal Bluet
- Enallagma vesperum Calvert, 1919 – Vesper Bluet
- Enallagma weewa Byers, 1927 – Blackwater Bluet
