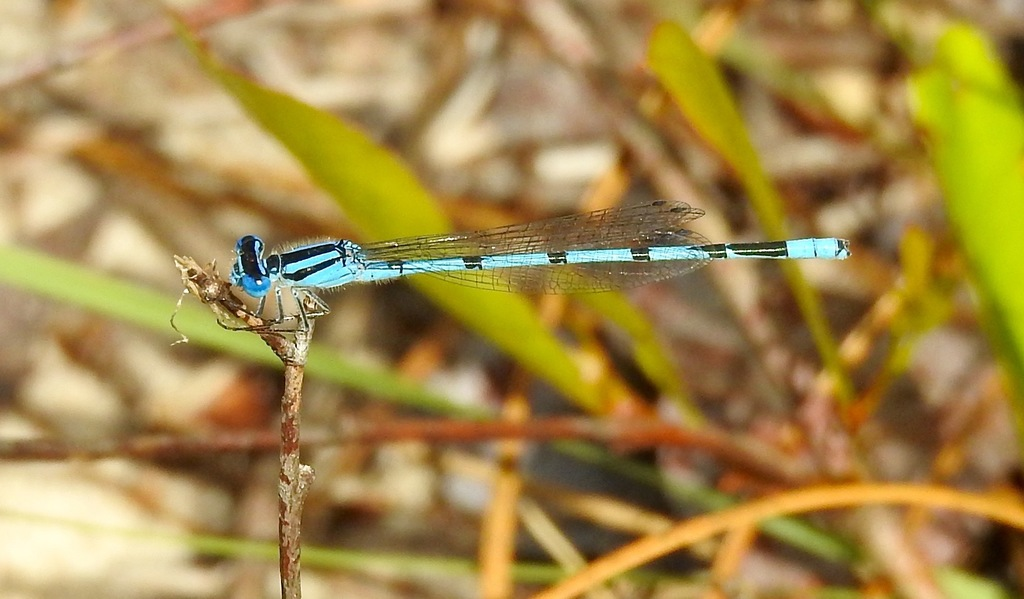

Conservation status
- Least Concern (IUCN 3.1)

Scientific classification
- Kingdom: Animalia
- Phylum: Arthropoda
- Class: Insecta
- Order: Odonata
- Suborder: Zygoptera
- Family: Coenagrionidae
- Genus: Enallagma
- Species: E. doubledayi

Binomial name
- Enallagma doubledayi (Selys, 1850)

= Enallagma doubledayi =

Species of damselfly

Enallagma doubledayi, the Atlantic bluet, is a species of narrow-winged damselfly in the family Coenagrionidae. It is found in the Caribbean and North America.

The IUCN conservation status of Enallagma doubledayi is "least concern", with no immediate threat to the species' survival. The population is stable. The IUCN status was reviewed in 2017.
