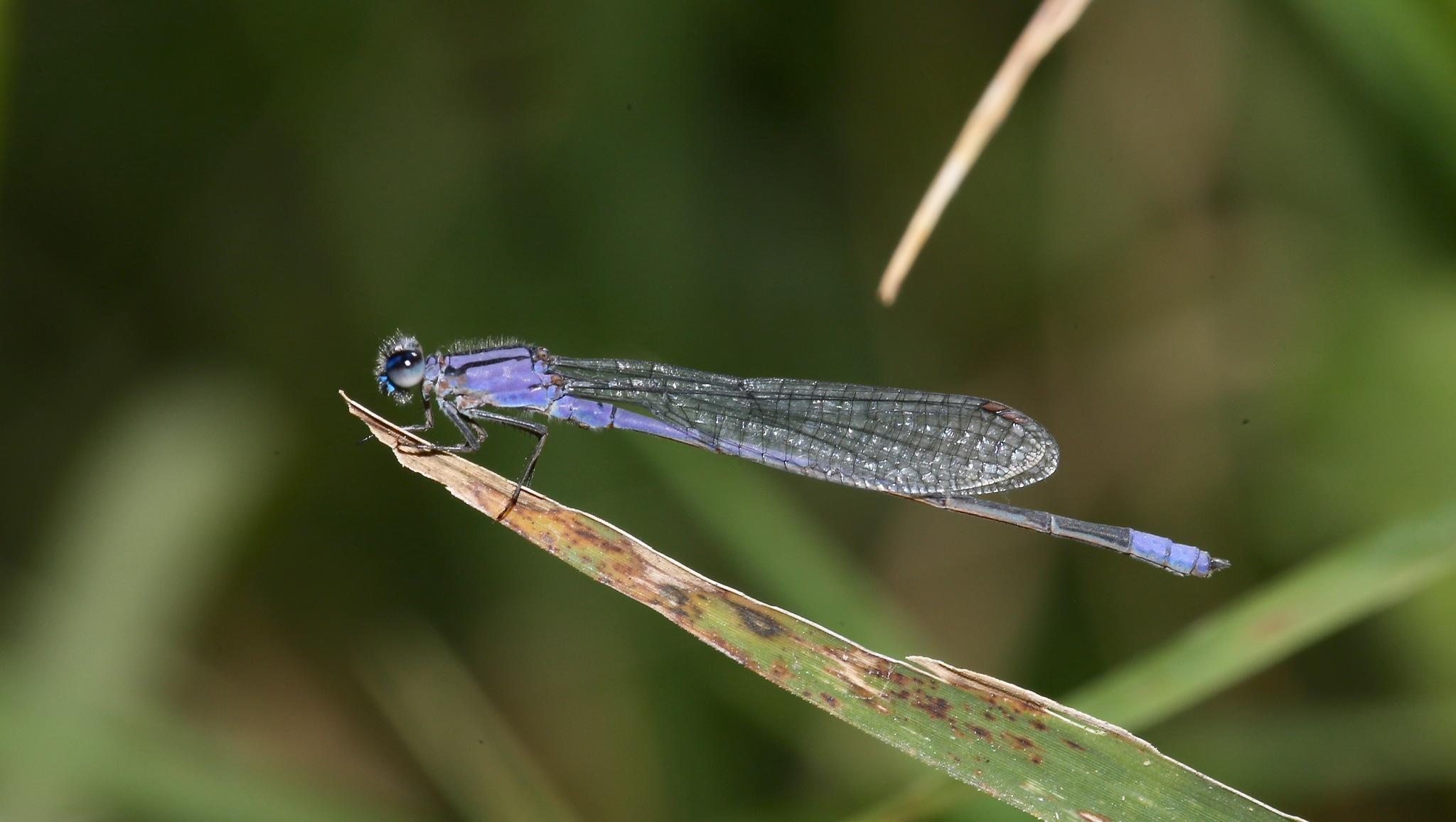
- In Jalisco, Mexico

Conservation status
- Least Concern (IUCN 3.1)

Scientific classification
- Kingdom: Animalia
- Phylum: Arthropoda
- Class: Insecta
- Order: Odonata
- Suborder: Zygoptera
- Family: Coenagrionidae
- Genus: Enallagma
- Species: E. semicirculare

Binomial name
- Enallagma semicirculare (Selys, 1876)

= Enallagma semicirculare =

Species of damselfly

Enallagma semicirculare, the claw-tipped bluet, is a species of damselfly generally found in Mexico and the southwestern United States (Arizona and New Mexico). It has also been sighted in southern Texas.
