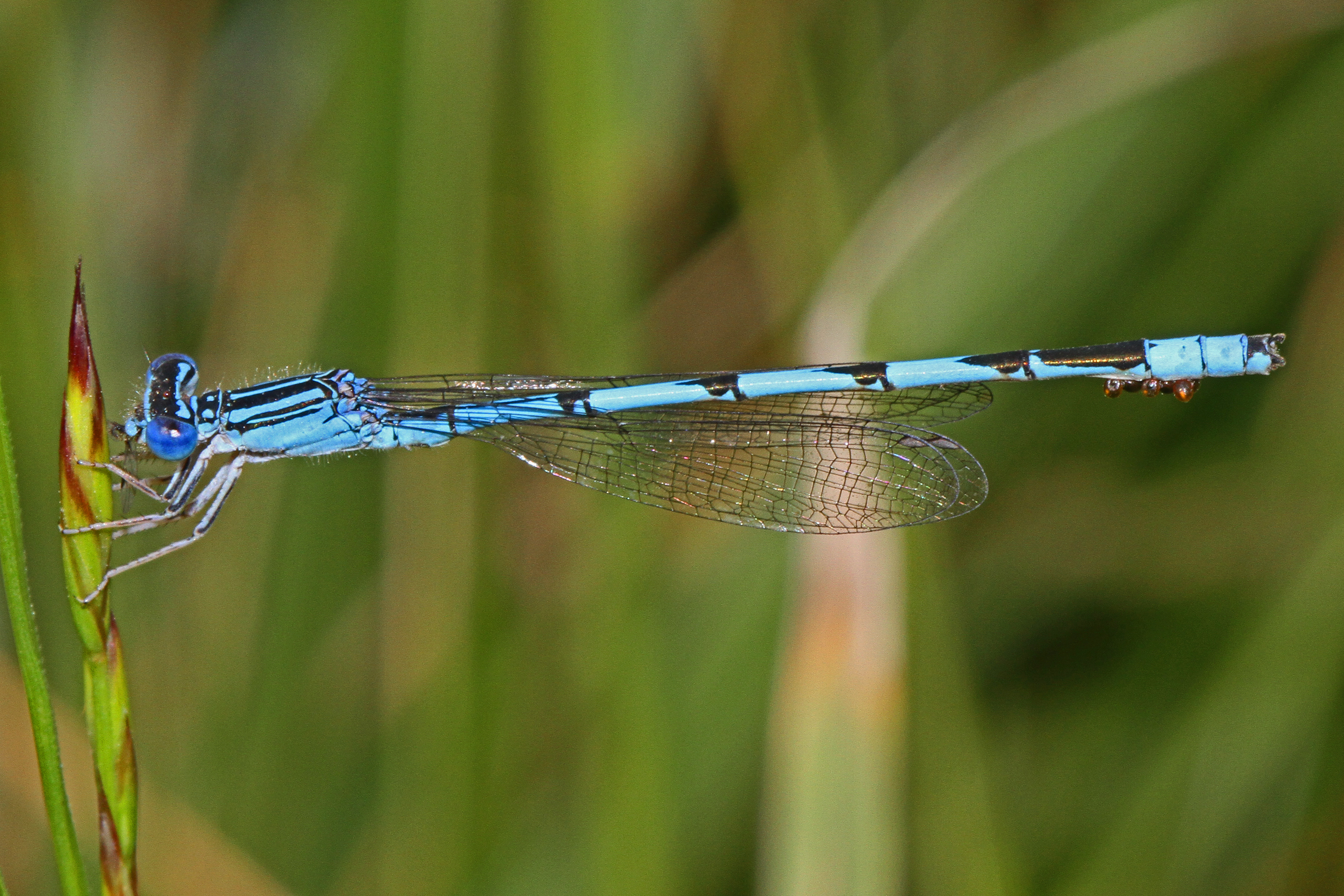

Conservation status
- Least Concern (IUCN 3.1)

Scientific classification
- Kingdom: Animalia
- Phylum: Arthropoda
- Clade: Pancrustacea
- Class: Insecta
- Order: Odonata
- Suborder: Zygoptera
- Family: Coenagrionidae
- Genus: Enallagma
- Species: E. basidens

Binomial name
- Enallagma basidens Calvert, 1902

= Double-striped bluet =

Species of damselfly

The double-striped bluet (Enallagma basidens) is a species of damselfly in the family Coenagrionidae. This species grows to lengths 21–28 mm. Its common name from the peculiar black shoulder stripe, which is divided in two by a thin blue stripe. This is the key identification characteristic; no other damselfly has a shoulder stripe that looks like this one.

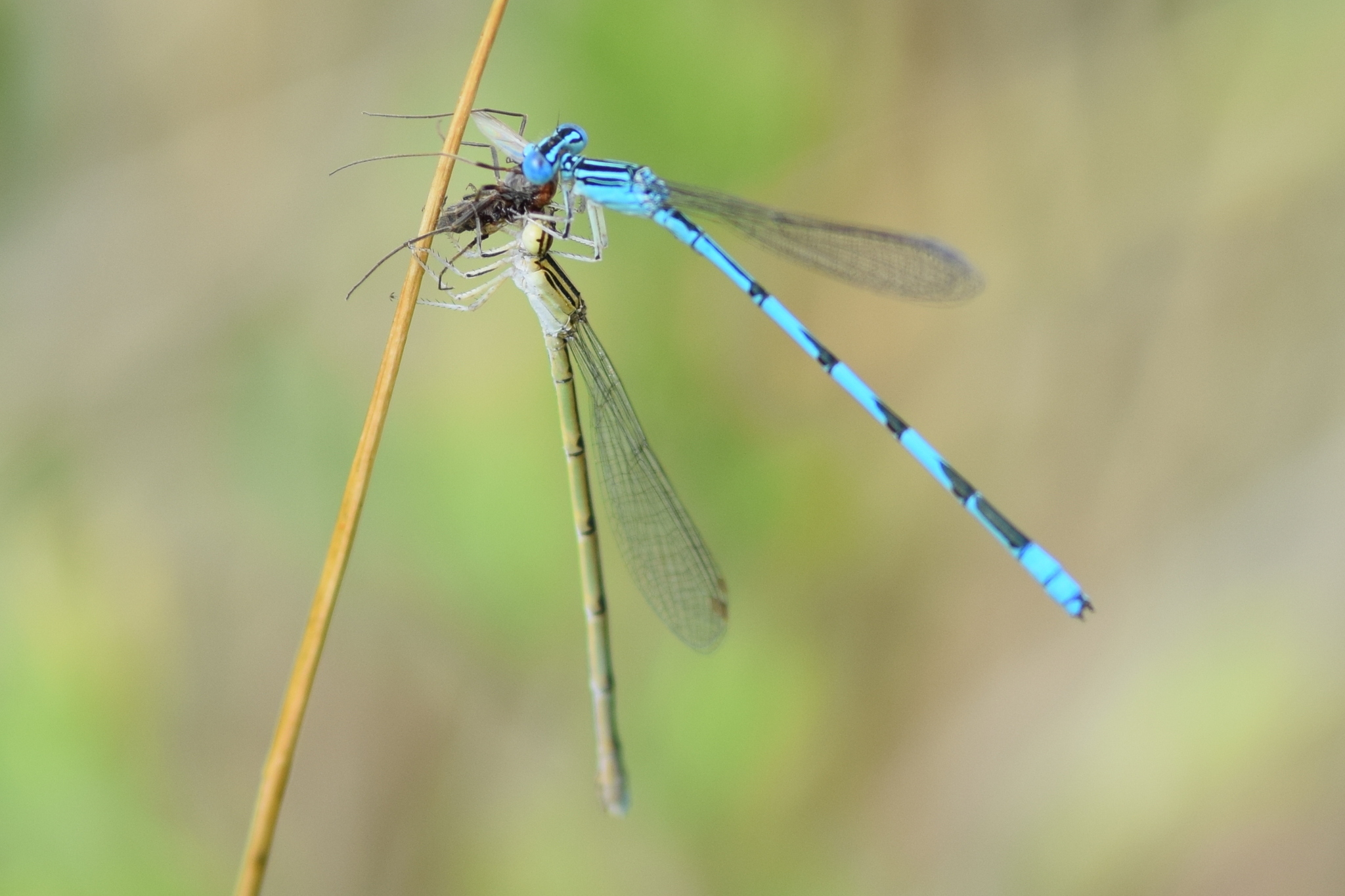
Male and female fighting over prey

Mature males have an abdomen that alternates black and blue. The final segment of the abdomen is blue below and black above, while segments 8 and 9 are all blue. Females and immatures are tan to olive or brown, but like the mature males they have the divided shoulder stripe.

These damselflies are most typically found alongside lakes and ponds, but are occasionally found next to slow-moving streams, too.

== Distribution ==
- Mexico: Tamaulipas, San Luis Potosí, Nuevo León, Coahuila, Chihuahua, Baja California
- United States: (Alabama • Arkansas • Arizona • California • Colorado • Delaware • Florida • Georgia • Iowa • Illinois • Indiana • Kansas • Kentucky • Louisiana • Maryland • Michigan • Missouri • Mississippi • Nebraska • North Carolina • New Jersey • New Mexico • Ohio • Pennsylvania • South Carolina • Tennessee • Texas • Vermont • Wisconsin • West Virginia)
- Canada: (Ontario)
