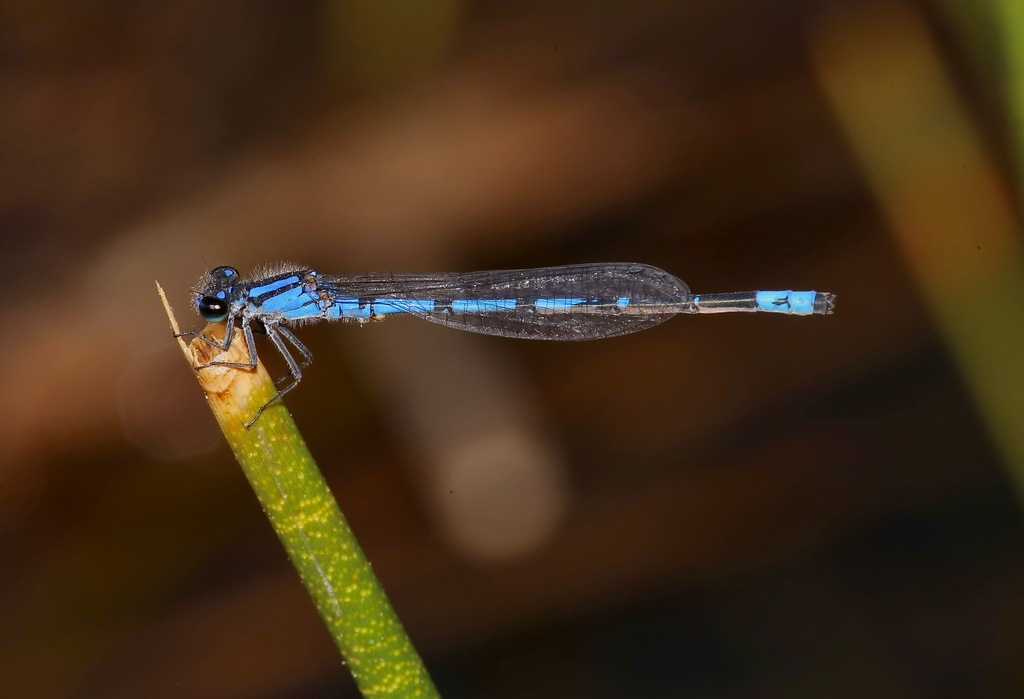

Conservation status
- Least Concern (IUCN 3.1)

Scientific classification
- Domain: Eukaryota
- Kingdom: Animalia
- Phylum: Arthropoda
- Class: Insecta
- Order: Odonata
- Suborder: Zygoptera
- Family: Coenagrionidae
- Genus: Enallagma
- Species: E. davisi

Binomial name
- Enallagma davisi Westfall, 1943

= Enallagma davisi =

Species of damselfly

Enallagma davisi, the sandhill bluet, is a species of narrow-winged damselfly in the family Coenagrionidae. It is found in North America.

The IUCN conservation status of Enallagma davisi is "LC", least concern, with no immediate threat to the species' survival. The population is stable.
