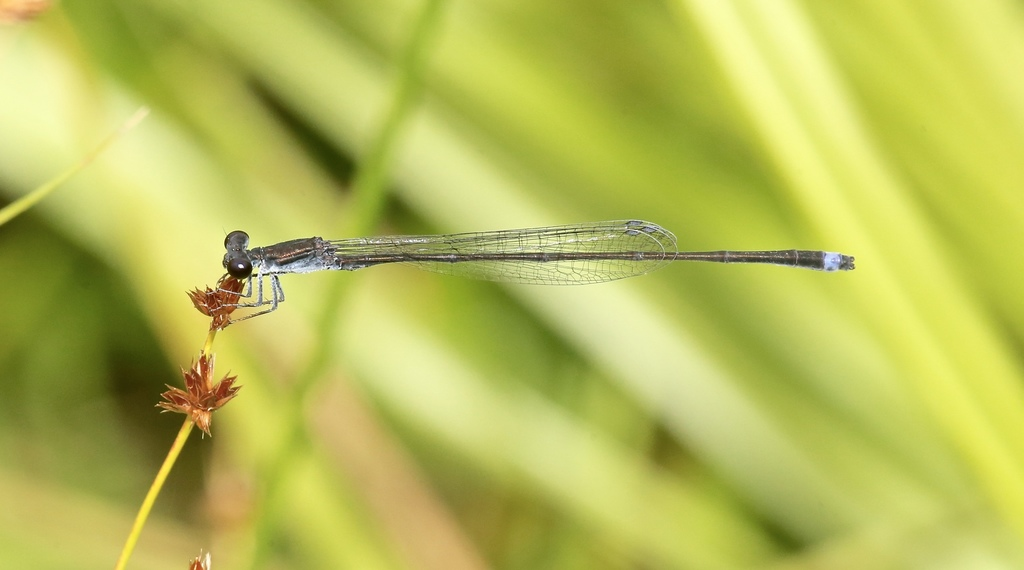

Conservation status
- Least Concern (IUCN 3.1)

Scientific classification
- Domain: Eukaryota
- Kingdom: Animalia
- Phylum: Arthropoda
- Class: Insecta
- Order: Odonata
- Suborder: Zygoptera
- Family: Coenagrionidae
- Genus: Enallagma
- Species: E. weewa

Binomial name
- Enallagma weewa Byers, 1927

= Enallagma weewa =

Species of damselfly

Enallagma weewa, the blackwater bluet, is a species of narrow-winged damselfly in the family Coenagrionidae. It is found in North America.

The IUCN conservation status of Enallagma weewa is "LC", least concern, with no immediate threat to the species' survival. The population is stable.
