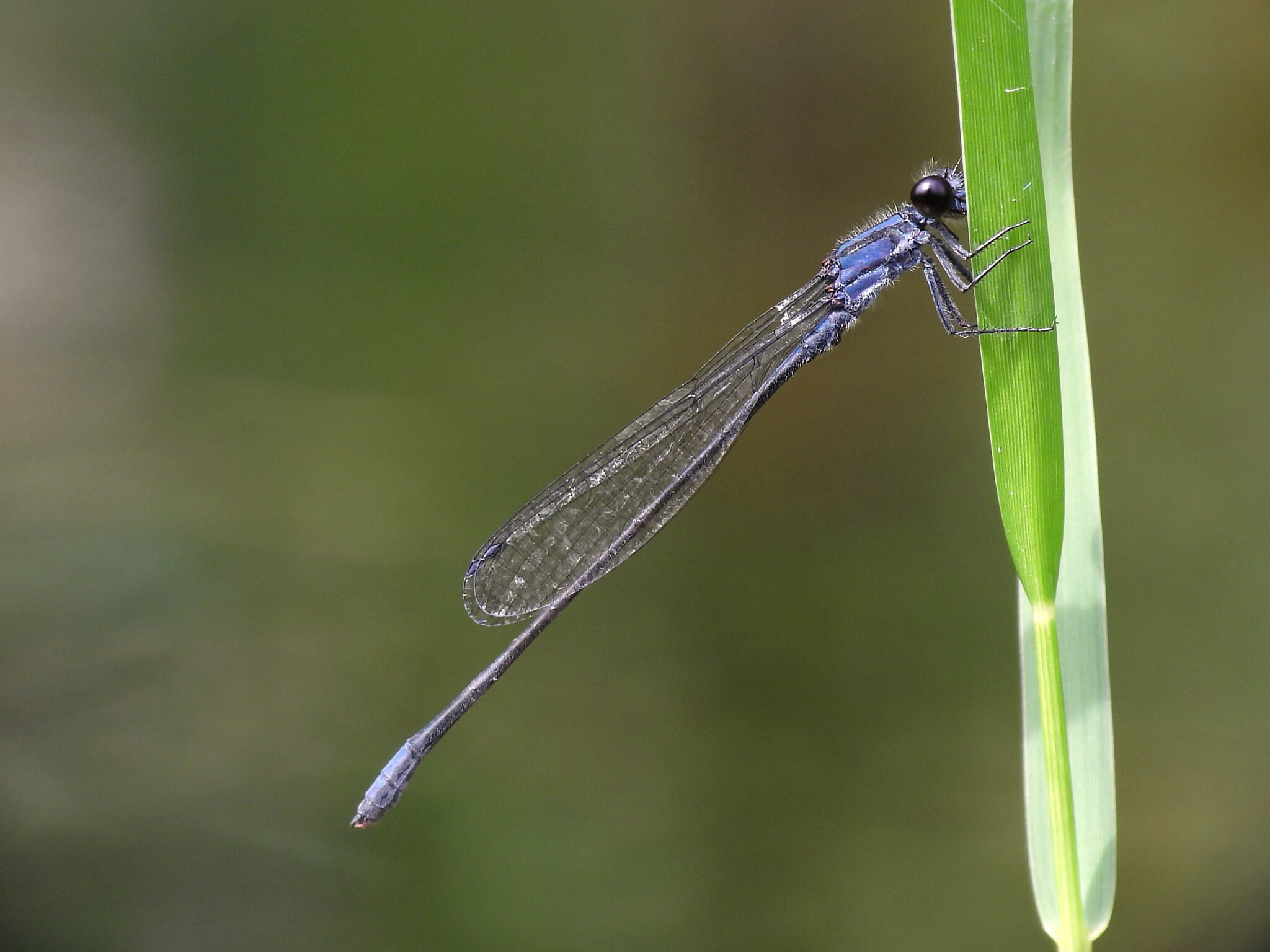
- Male
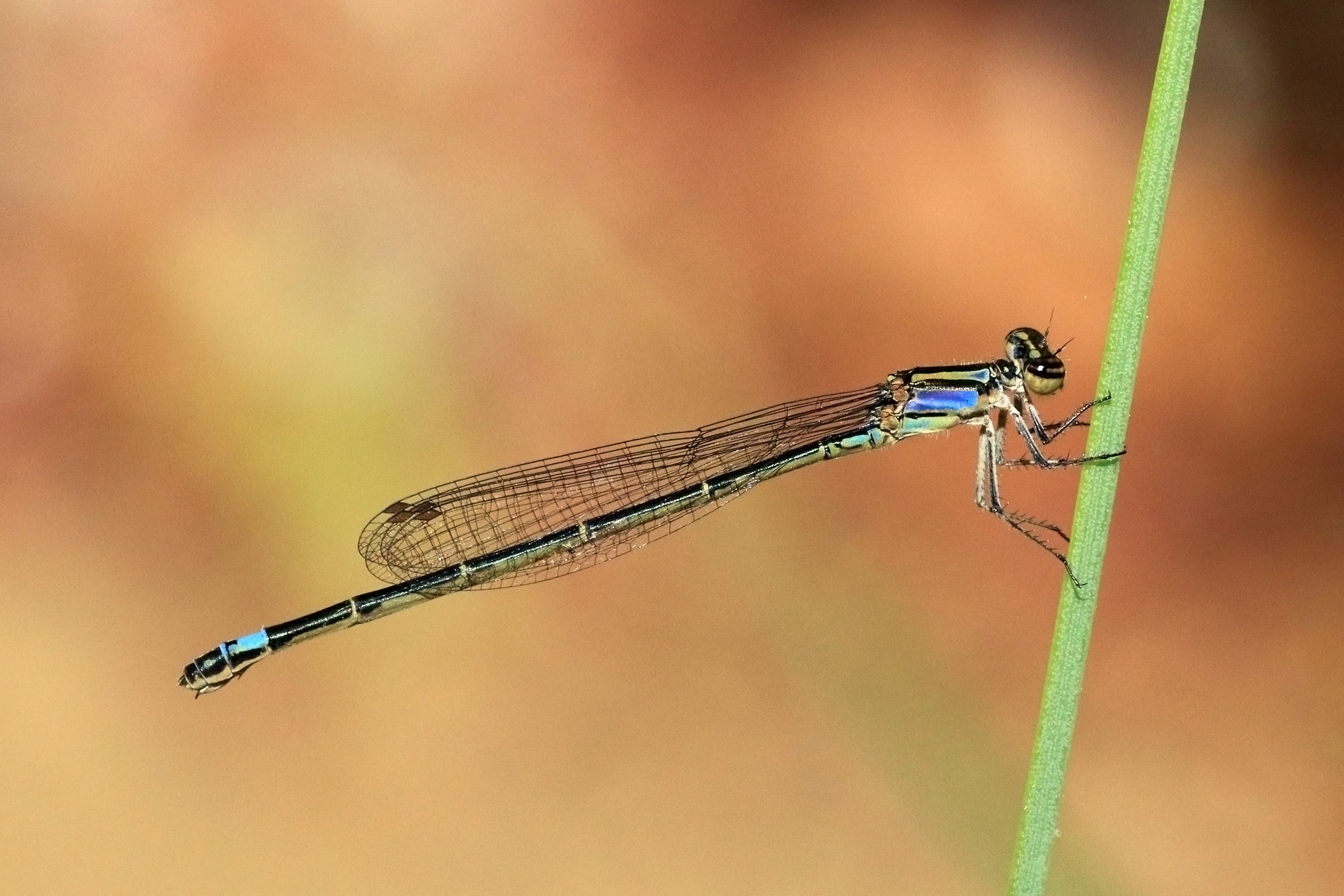
- Female

Scientific classification
- Kingdom: Animalia
- Phylum: Arthropoda
- Clade: Pancrustacea
- Class: Insecta
- Order: Odonata
- Suborder: Zygoptera
- Family: Coenagrionidae
- Genus: Enallagma
- Species: E. cardenium

Binomial name
- Enallagma cardenium Hagen in Selys, 1876

= Enallagma cardenium =

Species of damselfly

Enallagma cardenium, the purple bluet, is a species of narrow-winged damselfly in the family Coenagrionidae. It is found in the Caribbean and North America.

The IUCN conservation status of Enallagma cardenium is "LC", least concern, with no immediate threat to the species' survival. The population is stable.
