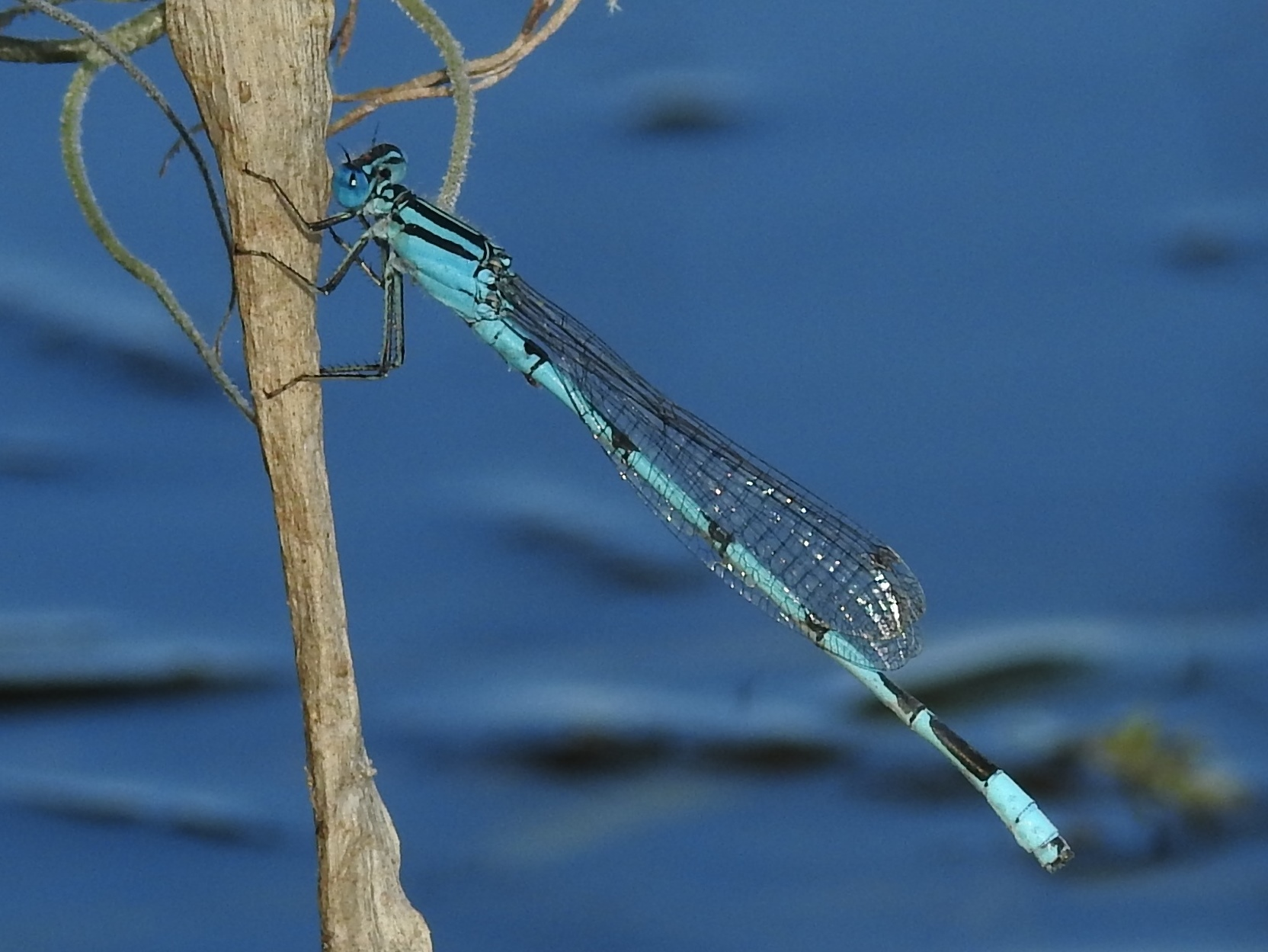
- Adult male in Florida, USA

Conservation status
- Least Concern (IUCN 3.1)

Scientific classification
- Kingdom: Animalia
- Phylum: Arthropoda
- Class: Insecta
- Order: Odonata
- Suborder: Zygoptera
- Family: Coenagrionidae
- Genus: Enallagma
- Species: E. durum

Binomial name
- Enallagma durum (Hagen, 1861)

= Enallagma durum =

Species of damselfly

Enallagma durum, the big bluet, is a species of narrow-winged damselfly in the family Coenagrionidae. It is found in northern Mexico and southern and eastern United States.

The IUCN conservation status of Enallagma durum is "least concern", with no immediate threat to the species' survival. The population is stable.

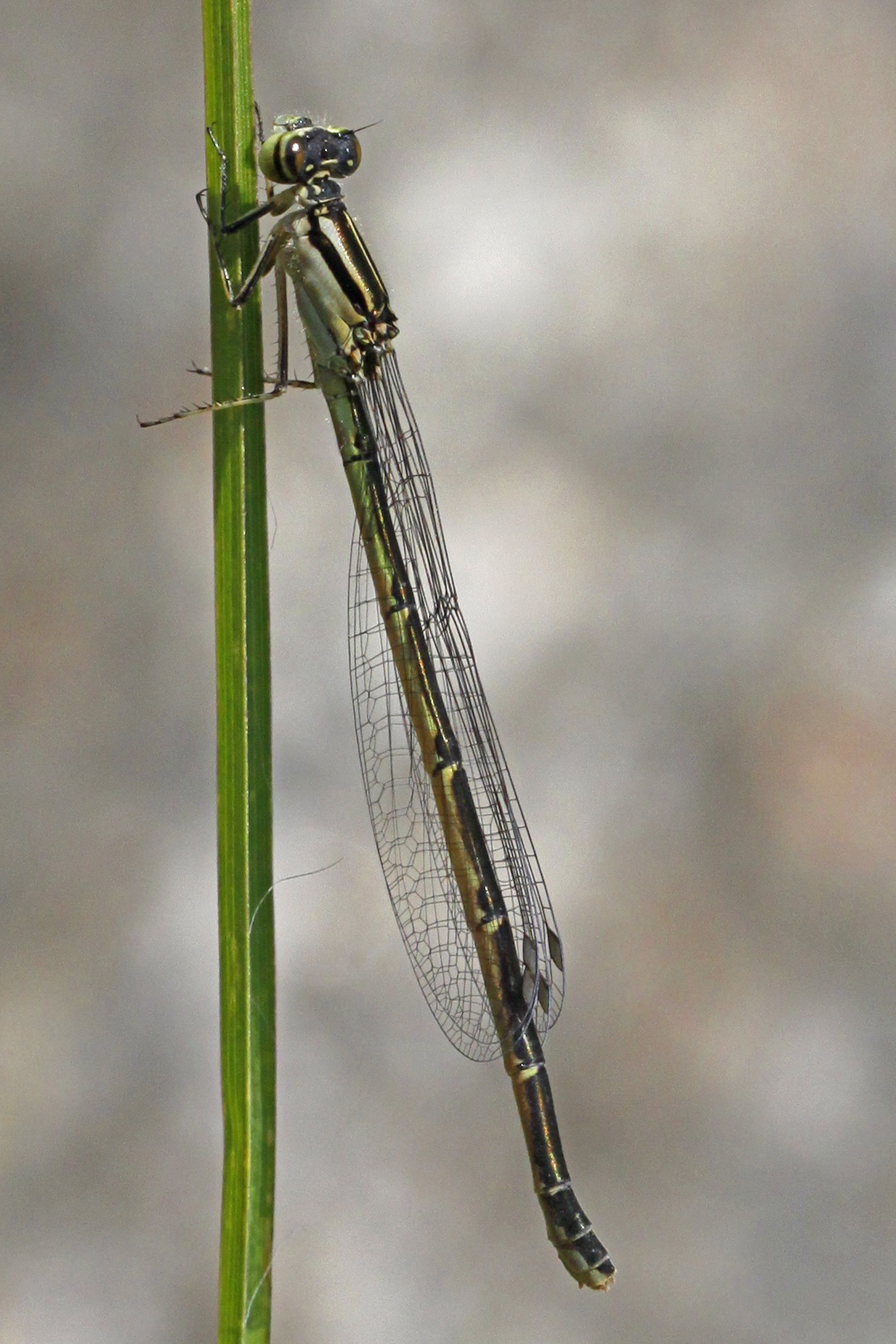
Big bluet, Enallagma durum

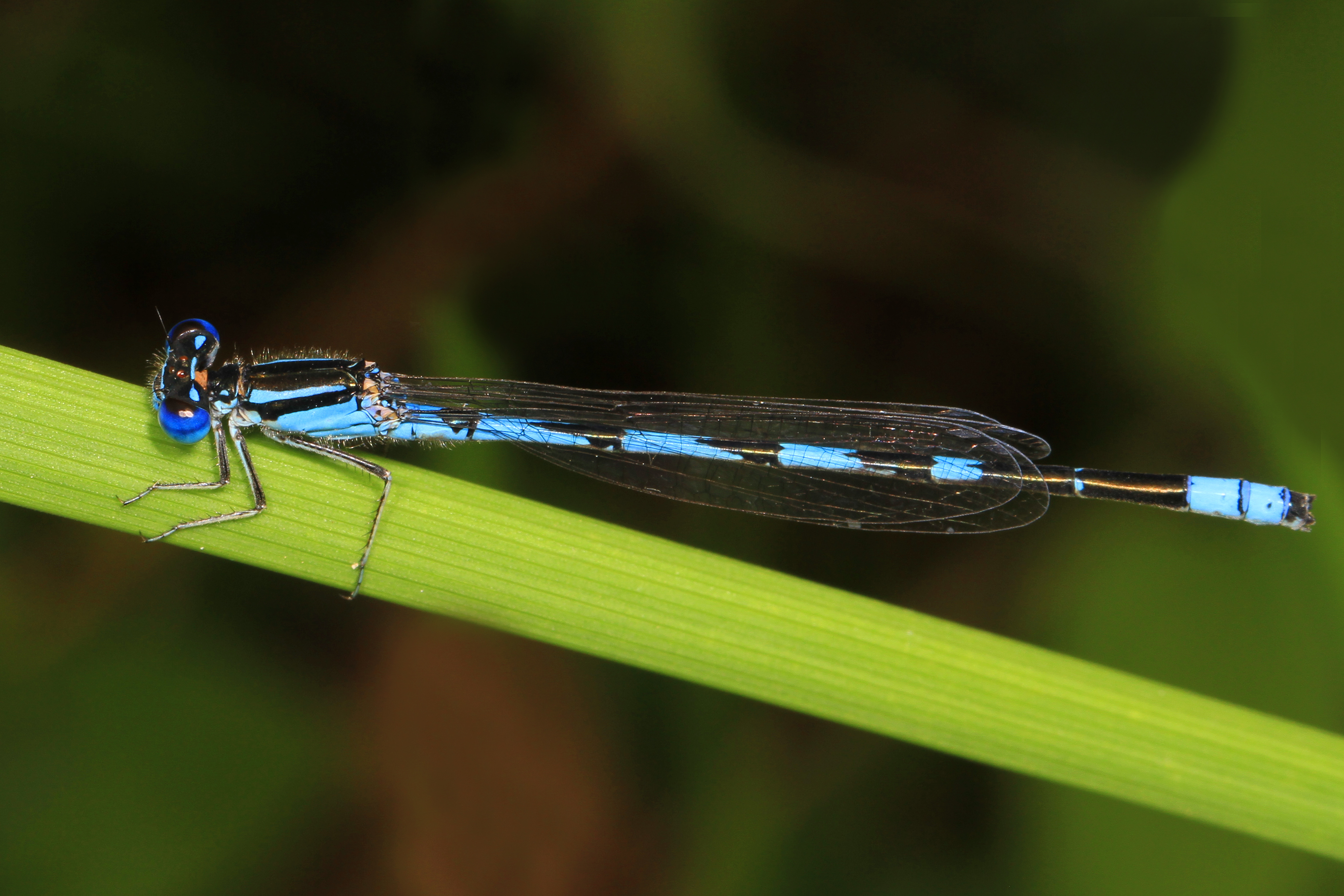
Big bluet, Enallagma durum
