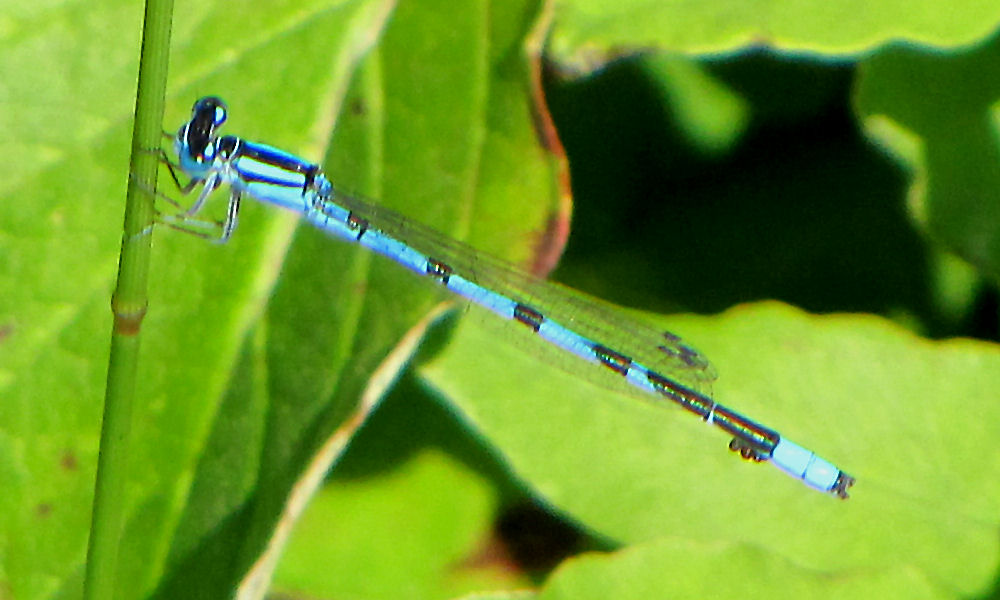
- male

Scientific classification
- Kingdom: Animalia
- Phylum: Arthropoda
- Clade: Pancrustacea
- Class: Insecta
- Order: Odonata
- Suborder: Zygoptera
- Family: Coenagrionidae
- Genus: Enallagma
- Species: E. ebrium

Binomial name
- Enallagma ebrium (Hagen, 1861)

= Marsh bluet =

Species of damselfly

The marsh bluet (Enallagma ebrium) is a damselfly species in the family Coenagrionidae.

== Description ==
- Adult – Male marsh bluets have a blue thorax with a broad black stripe above and has two black shoulder stripes. Its slender abdomen is mostly blue with black marks along the top and with a black tip. The large eyes are dark blue-black with small, tear-shaped postocular spots. The thorax of the female is similar to the male only its tan or blue-green and black instead of blue and black. Its abdomen is mostly black above and tan or blue-green below. Its large eyes are brown and yellowish.
- Naiad – The naiad is small about 16 to 20 mm (0.63 to 0.79 in) in length. It has the typical slender shape of an immature damselfly. The naiad is light to dark brown in color.

== Habitat ==
Marsh bluets are usually found near lowland lakes, ponds, and marshes, and has a definite preference for alkaline waters.

== Diet ==
- Naiad – They eat a wide variety of aquatic insects, including mosquito larvae, mayfly larvae, and other aquatic fly larvae.
- Adult – Adult bluets eat a wide variety of small soft-bodied flying insects, such as mosquitoes, mayflies, flies and small moths. They sometimes pick small insects such as aphids from plants.

== Size ==
It is a smaller species of bluets, with a size of 25–34 mm (0.98–1.34 in) in length.

== Distribution ==
- United States (Colorado • Connecticut • Iowa • Idaho • Illinois • Indiana • Kentucky • Massachusetts • Maryland • Maine • Michigan • Minnesota • Montana • Nebraska • North Dakota • New Hampshire • New Jersey • Ohio • Pennsylvania • Rhode Island • South Dakota • Tennessee • U.S. Virgin Islands • Vermont • Washington • Wisconsin • Wyoming)
- Canada (Alberta • British Columbia • Manitoba • New Brunswick • Northwest Territories • Nova Scotia • Ontario • Prince Edward Island • Quebec • Saskatchewan)

== Habits ==
Marsh bluets perch occasionally on vegetation in the area with the wings together. Their flight pattern is slow. They dart in and out of emergent vegetation.

== Flight season ==
The marsh bluet is active early June to early September.

== Ecology ==
Marsh bluets are very common at alkaline marshes in mid-summer.

== Reproduction ==
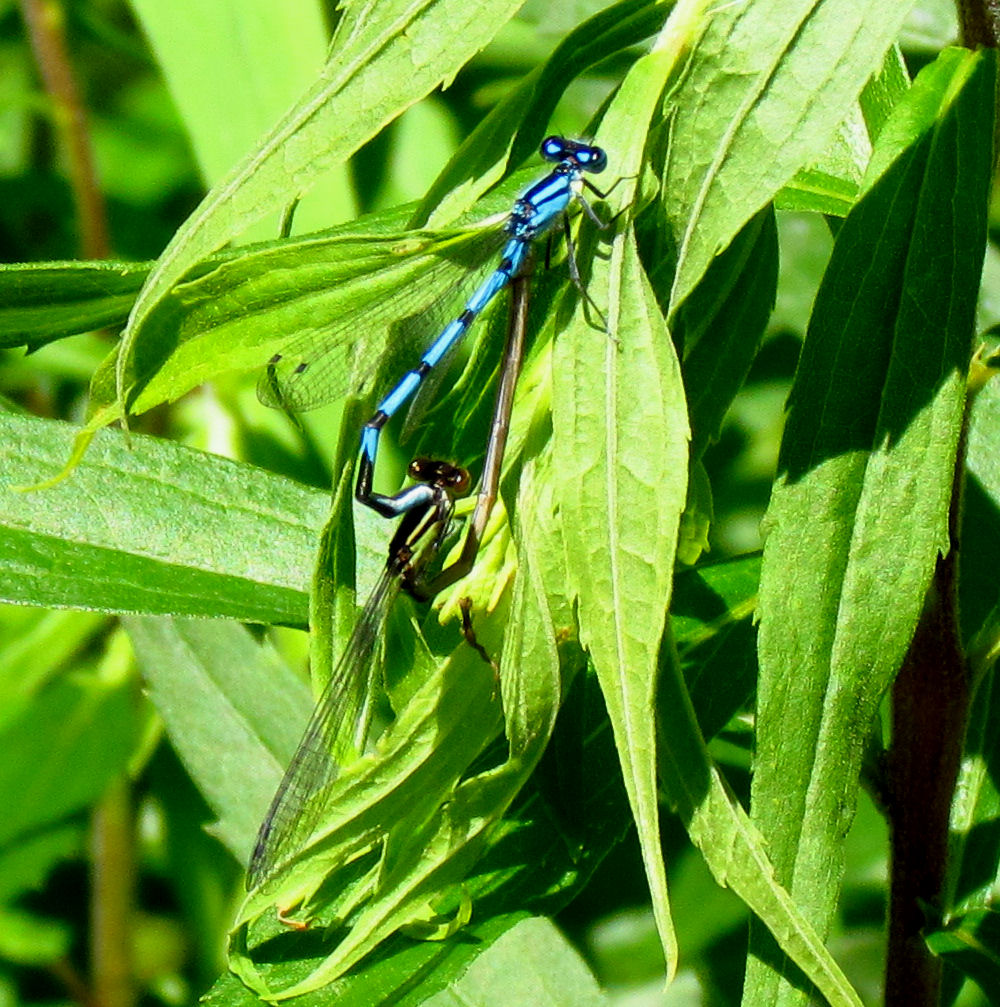
In wheel position

Males set up territories at choice breeding sites. After males and females mate, the female oviposits, or lays her eggs, either singly or in tandem with the male. They will descend as much as a foot under the water to oviposit in aquatic vegetation.

== Similar species ==
The marsh bluet looks similar to the Hagen's bluet and the familiar bluet.
