= Enallagma pallidum =

Conservation status
- Least Concern (IUCN 3.1)

Scientific classification
- Domain: Eukaryota
- Kingdom: Animalia
- Phylum: Arthropoda
- Class: Insecta
- Order: Odonata
- Suborder: Zygoptera
- Family: Coenagrionidae
- Genus: Enallagma
- Species: E. pallidum

Binomial name
- Enallagma pallidum Root, 1923

Species of damselfly

Enallagma pallidum, the pale bluet or pallid bluet, is a species of narrow-winged damselfly in the family Coenagrionidae. It is found in North America.

The IUCN conservation status of Enallagma pallidum is "LC", least concern, with no immediate threat to the species' survival. The population is stable.
