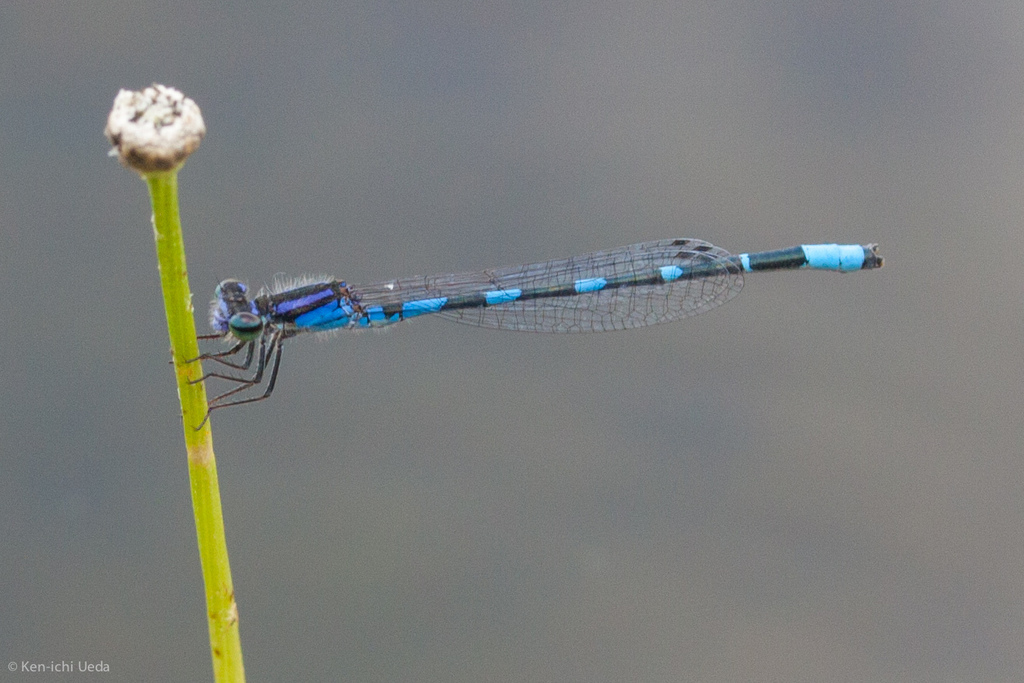

Conservation status
- Least Concern (IUCN 3.1)

Scientific classification
- Domain: Eukaryota
- Kingdom: Animalia
- Phylum: Arthropoda
- Class: Insecta
- Order: Odonata
- Suborder: Zygoptera
- Family: Coenagrionidae
- Genus: Enallagma
- Species: E. minusculum

Binomial name
- Enallagma minusculum Morse, 1895

= Enallagma minusculum =

Species of damselfly

Enallagma minusculum, the little bluet, is a species of narrow-winged damselfly in the family Coenagrionidae. It is found in North America. This species was first described by American entomologist Albert Pitts Morse in 1895.

The IUCN conservation status of Enallagma minusculum is "LC", least concern, with no immediate threat to the species' survival. The population is stable.
