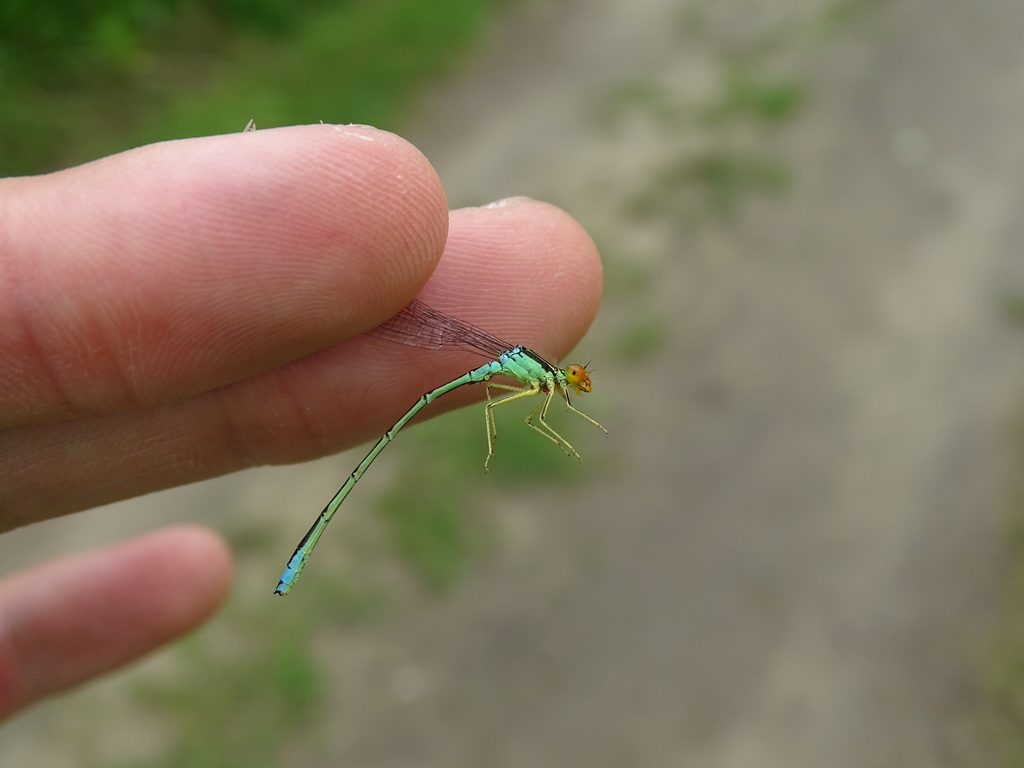

Conservation status
- Least Concern (IUCN 3.1)

Scientific classification
- Kingdom: Animalia
- Phylum: Arthropoda
- Class: Insecta
- Order: Odonata
- Suborder: Zygoptera
- Family: Coenagrionidae
- Genus: Enallagma
- Species: E. antennatum

Binomial name
- Enallagma antennatum (Say, 1839)

= Enallagma antennatum =

Species of damselfly

Enallagma antennatum, the rainbow bluet, is a species of narrow-winged damselfly in the family Coenagrionidae. It is found in eastern and central North America.

The IUCN conservation status of Enallagma antennatum is "LC", least concern, with no immediate threat to the species' survival. The population is stable. The IUCN status was reviewed in 2017.
