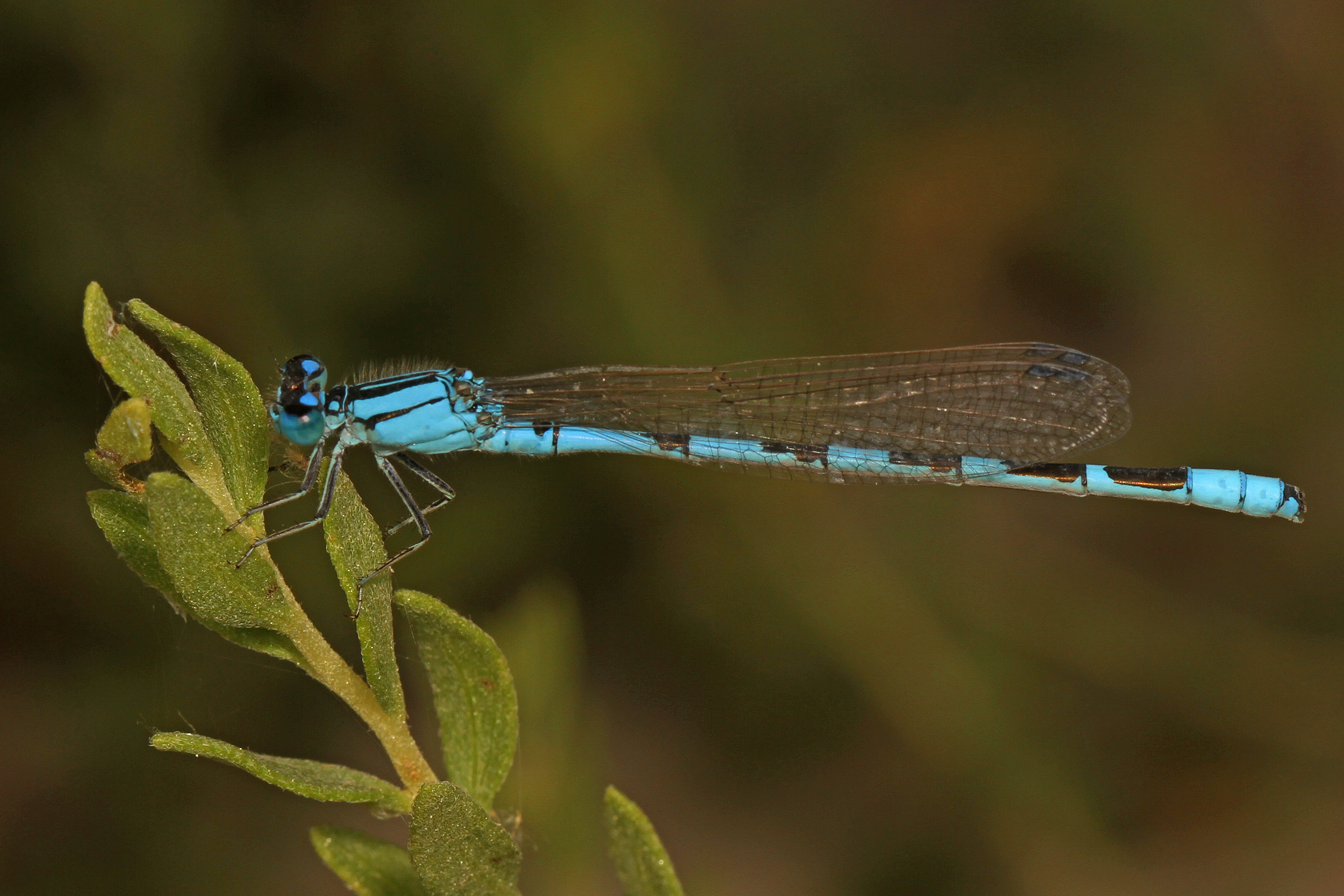

Conservation status
- Least Concern (IUCN 3.1)

Scientific classification
- Kingdom: Animalia
- Phylum: Arthropoda
- Class: Insecta
- Order: Odonata
- Suborder: Zygoptera
- Family: Coenagrionidae
- Genus: Enallagma
- Species: E. clausum

Binomial name
- Enallagma clausum Morse, 1895

= Enallagma clausum =

Species of damselfly

Enallagma clausum, the alkali bluet, is a species of narrow-winged damselfly in the family Coenagrionidae. It is found in North America.

The IUCN conservation status of Enallagma clausum is "LC", least concern, with no immediate threat to the species' survival. The population is stable.
