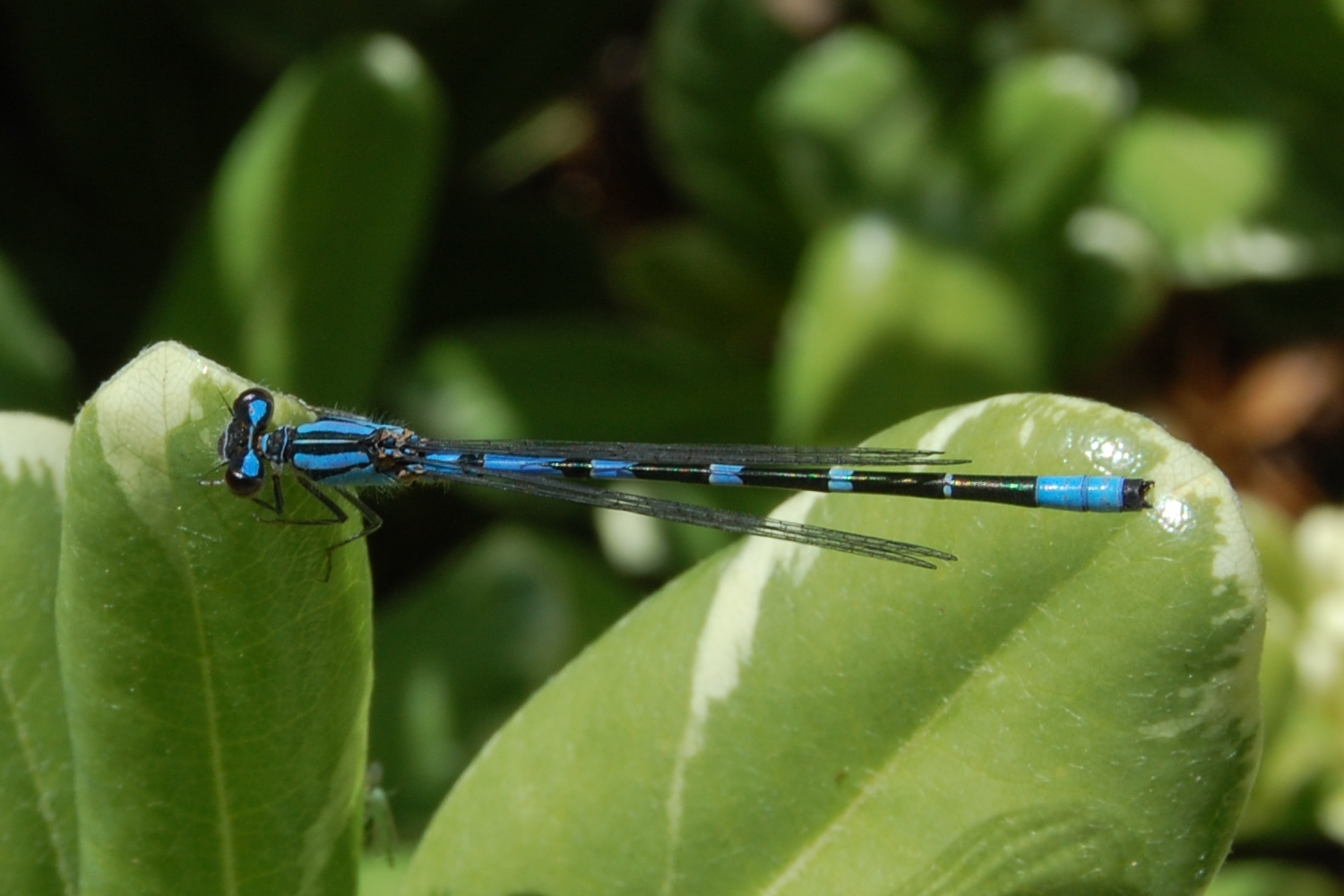

Conservation status
- Least Concern (IUCN 3.1)

Scientific classification
- Kingdom: Animalia
- Phylum: Arthropoda
- Class: Insecta
- Order: Odonata
- Suborder: Zygoptera
- Family: Coenagrionidae
- Genus: Enallagma
- Species: E. praevarum

Binomial name
- Enallagma praevarum (Hagen, 1861)

= Arroyo bluet =

Species of damselfly

The arroyo bluet (Enallagma praevarum) is a damselfly of the family Coenagrionidae, native to the western United States, south to southern Mexico. It is associated with slow-flowing streams or lake margins with emergent vegetation.

== Anatomy and morphology ==
=== Male ===
Males have blue eyes, accompanied by oval, raindrop shaped turquoise spots above each eye. Their abdomen is blue with large black rectangular spots lining the top, ending in an abdomen tip of the same color set.

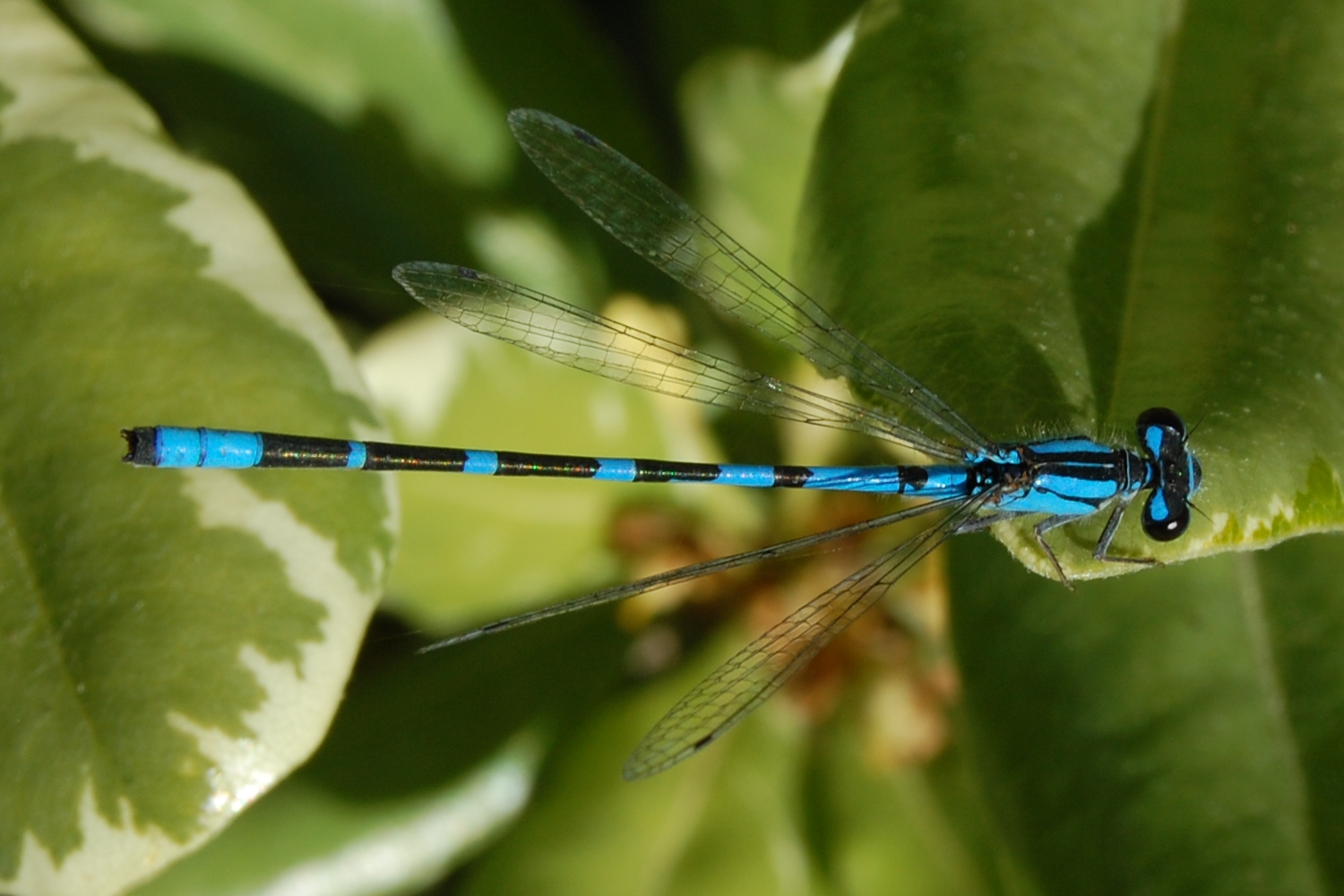
A male Arroyo Bluett

=== Female ===
Females possess the same build as males, but can also be found in tan or lighter blue shades rather than turquoise. Their legs are a lighter brown color (as opposed to black), and the spots above their eyes are usually larger than their male counterparts.

== Distribution and habitat ==
=== Distribution ===
Arroyo Bluets occupy both the west coast of Southern California and the region of sagebrush along the northeastern California border. The elevations at which the Arroyo bluet can be most commonly found are best described as intermediate. In northeastern California, the Arroyo Bluet has been recorded from sea level at elevations up to 4,600 feet or 1,400 meters. These damselflies are abundant in western Texas, along with south Nevada, and statewide-spread throughout Arizona and New Mexico.

=== Habitat ===
The habitat of the Arroyo Bluet typically consists of open regions with abundances of shrubs and trees. The climate of their habitat is typically arid. The Arroyo Bluet tends to inhabit areas in which there are bodies of water such as ponds and the backwaters of arroyos, washes, canyons, and rivers. Their habitat may be generally referred to as riparian thickets.

== Behavior ==
The Arroyo Bluet exhibits behavior that is similar to other bluets. It forages in its habitat and in the opposite direction of where water is located such as in oak savannas and grasslands. The flight season of the Arroyo Bluet consists of the month of March until October.

Males are often found near water where vegetation is abundant. Females are often found in mating pairs. Female pairs will oviposit within vegetation that is floating. They submerge themselves underwater to lay eggs while males guard above water.
