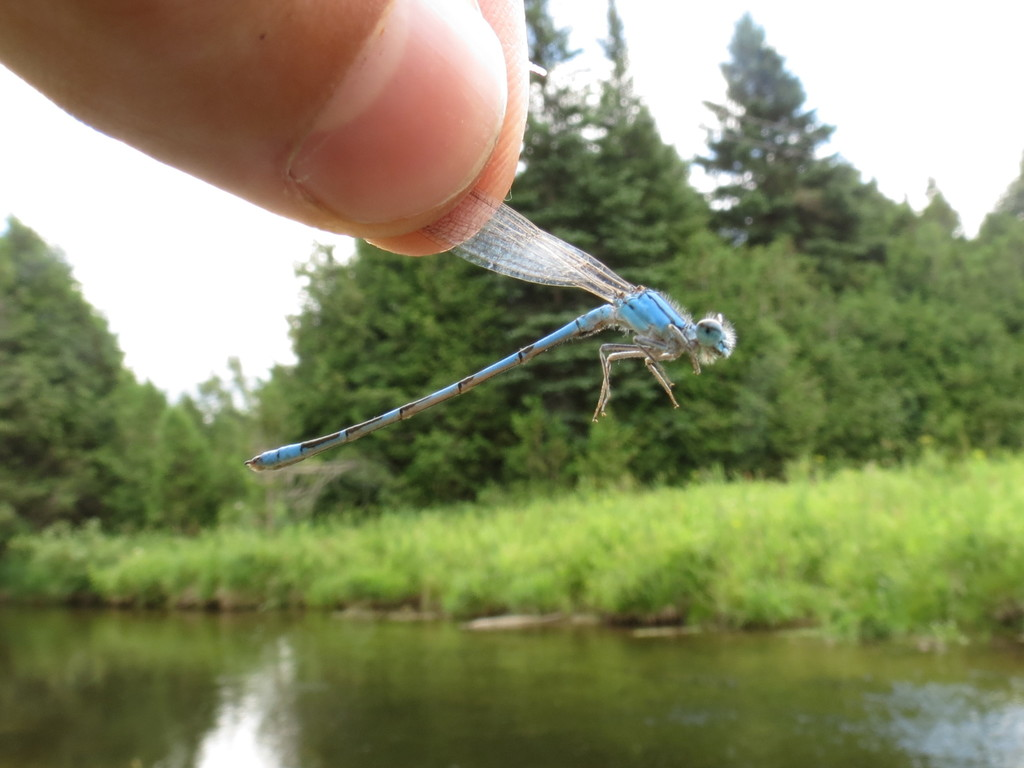

Conservation status
- Least Concern (IUCN 3.1)

Scientific classification
- Kingdom: Animalia
- Phylum: Arthropoda
- Class: Insecta
- Order: Odonata
- Suborder: Zygoptera
- Family: Coenagrionidae
- Genus: Enallagma
- Species: E. anna

Binomial name
- Enallagma anna Williamson, 1900

= Enallagma anna =

Species of damselfly

Enallagma anna, the river bluet, is a species of narrow-winged damselfly in the family Coenagrionidae. It is found in southern Canada and western and northeastern United States.

The IUCN conservation status of Enallagma anna is "least concern", with no immediate threat to the species' survival. The population is stable.
