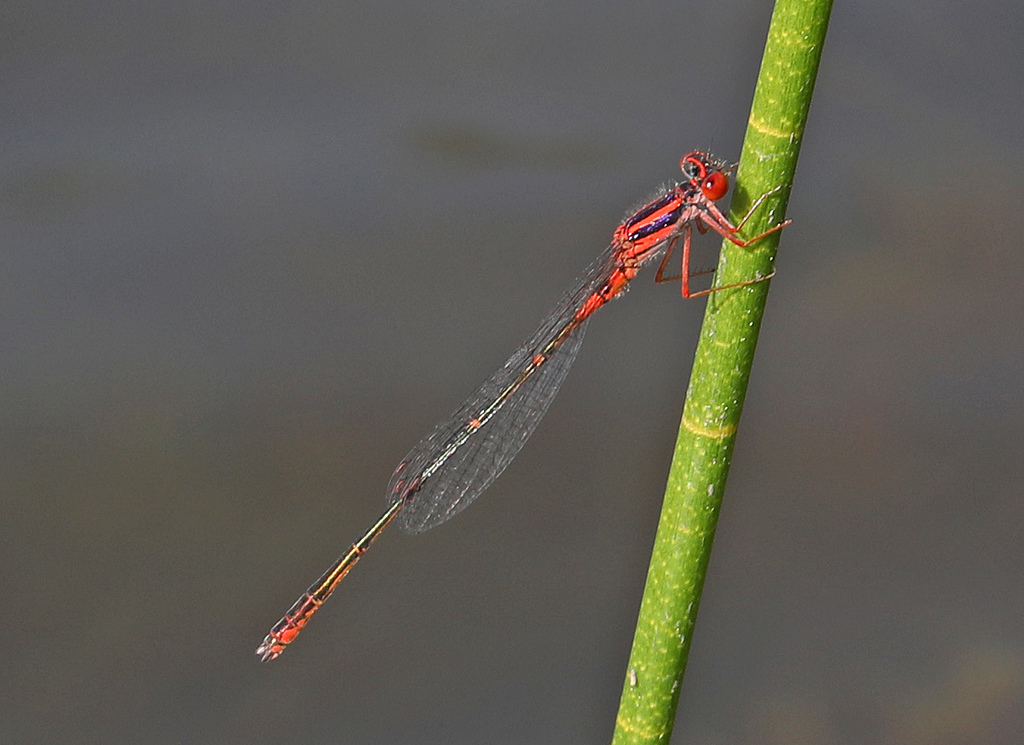

Conservation status
- Least Concern (IUCN 3.1)

Scientific classification
- Kingdom: Animalia
- Phylum: Arthropoda
- Class: Insecta
- Order: Odonata
- Suborder: Zygoptera
- Family: Coenagrionidae
- Genus: Enallagma
- Species: E. concisum

Binomial name
- Enallagma concisum Williamson, 1922

= Enallagma concisum =

Species of damselfly

Enallagma concisum, the cherry bluet, is a species of narrow-winged damselfly in the family Coenagrionidae. It is endemic to the Eastern United States.

The IUCN conservation status of Enallagma concisum is "least concern", with no immediate threat to the species' survival. The population is stable.

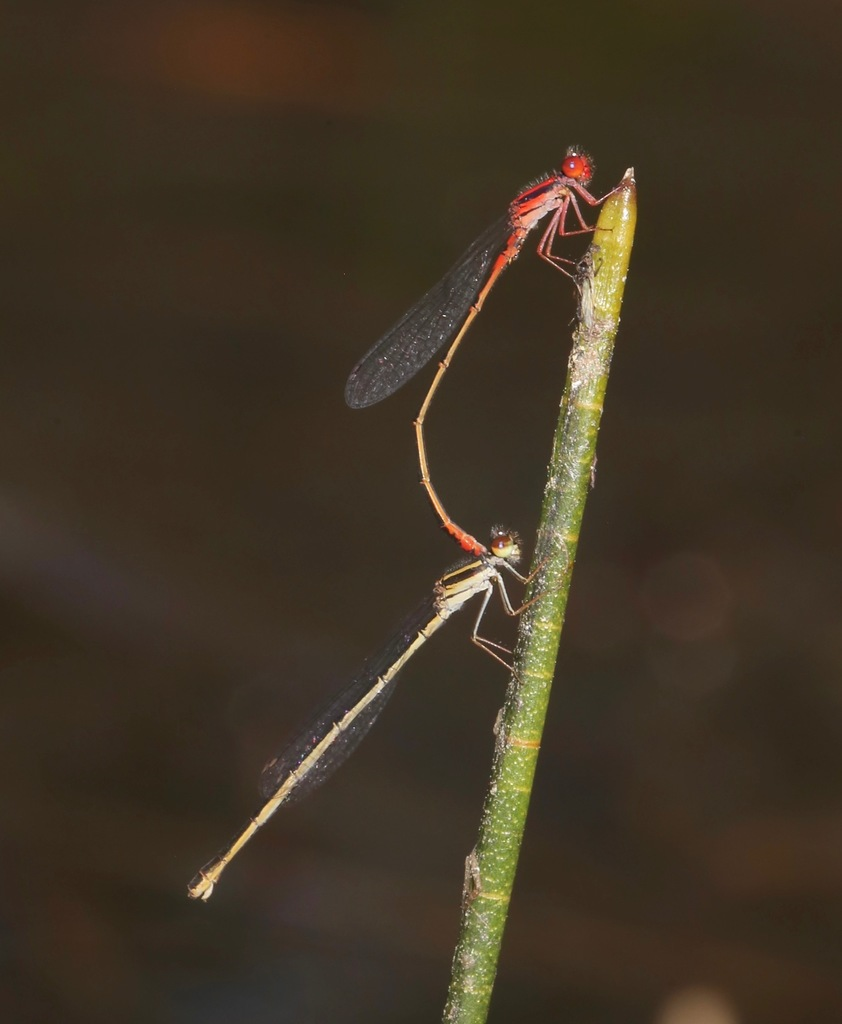
pair
