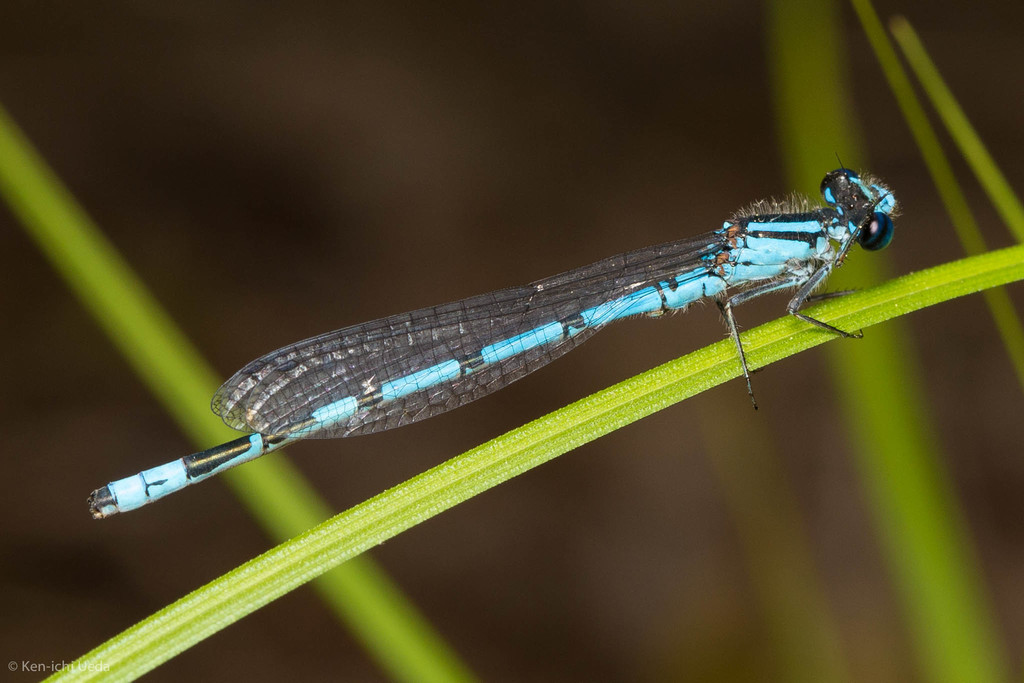

Conservation status
- Least Concern (IUCN 3.1)

Scientific classification
- Domain: Eukaryota
- Kingdom: Animalia
- Phylum: Arthropoda
- Class: Insecta
- Order: Odonata
- Suborder: Zygoptera
- Family: Coenagrionidae
- Genus: Enallagma
- Species: E. laterale

Binomial name
- Enallagma laterale Morse, 1895

= Enallagma laterale =

Species of damselfly

Enallagma laterale, the New England bluet, is a species of narrow-winged damselfly in the family Coenagrionidae. It is found in North America.

The IUCN conservation status of Enallagma laterale is "LC", least concern, with no immediate threat to the species' survival. The population is stable.
