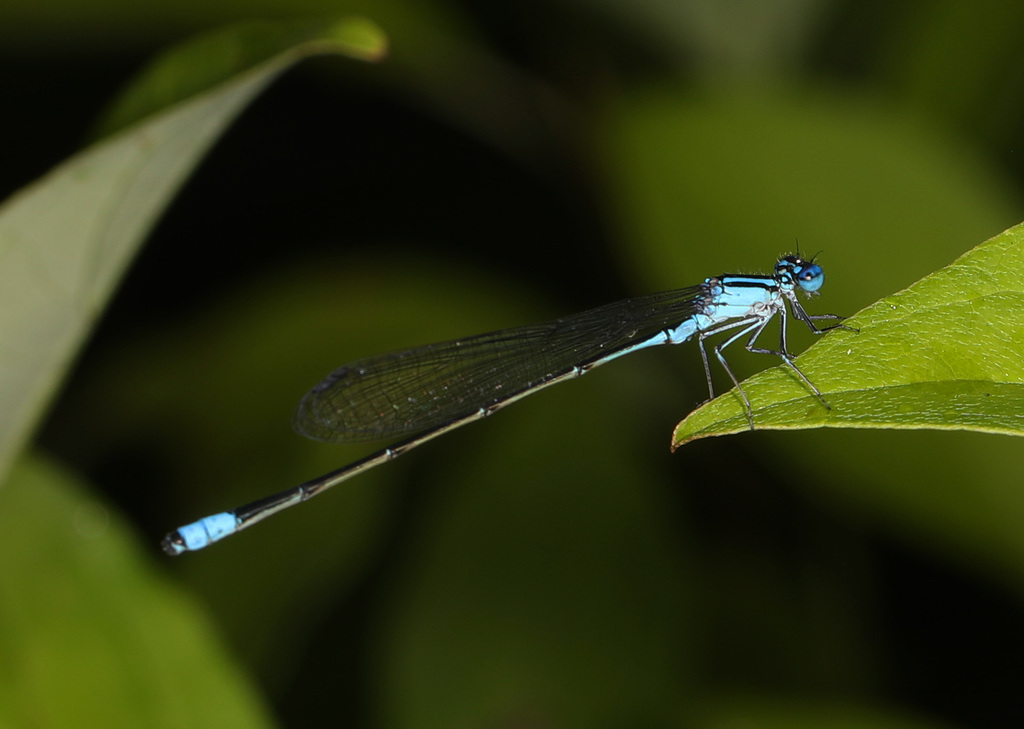

Conservation status
- Least Concern (IUCN 3.1)

Scientific classification
- Kingdom: Animalia
- Phylum: Arthropoda
- Class: Insecta
- Order: Odonata
- Suborder: Zygoptera
- Family: Coenagrionidae
- Genus: Enallagma
- Species: E. divagans

Binomial name
- Enallagma divagans Selys, 1876

= Enallagma divagans =

Species of damselfly

Enallagma divagans, the turquoise bluet, is a species of narrow-winged damselfly in the family Coenagrionidae. It is endemic to the United States.

The IUCN conservation status of Enallagma divagans is "least concern", with no immediate threat to the species' survival. The population is stable.

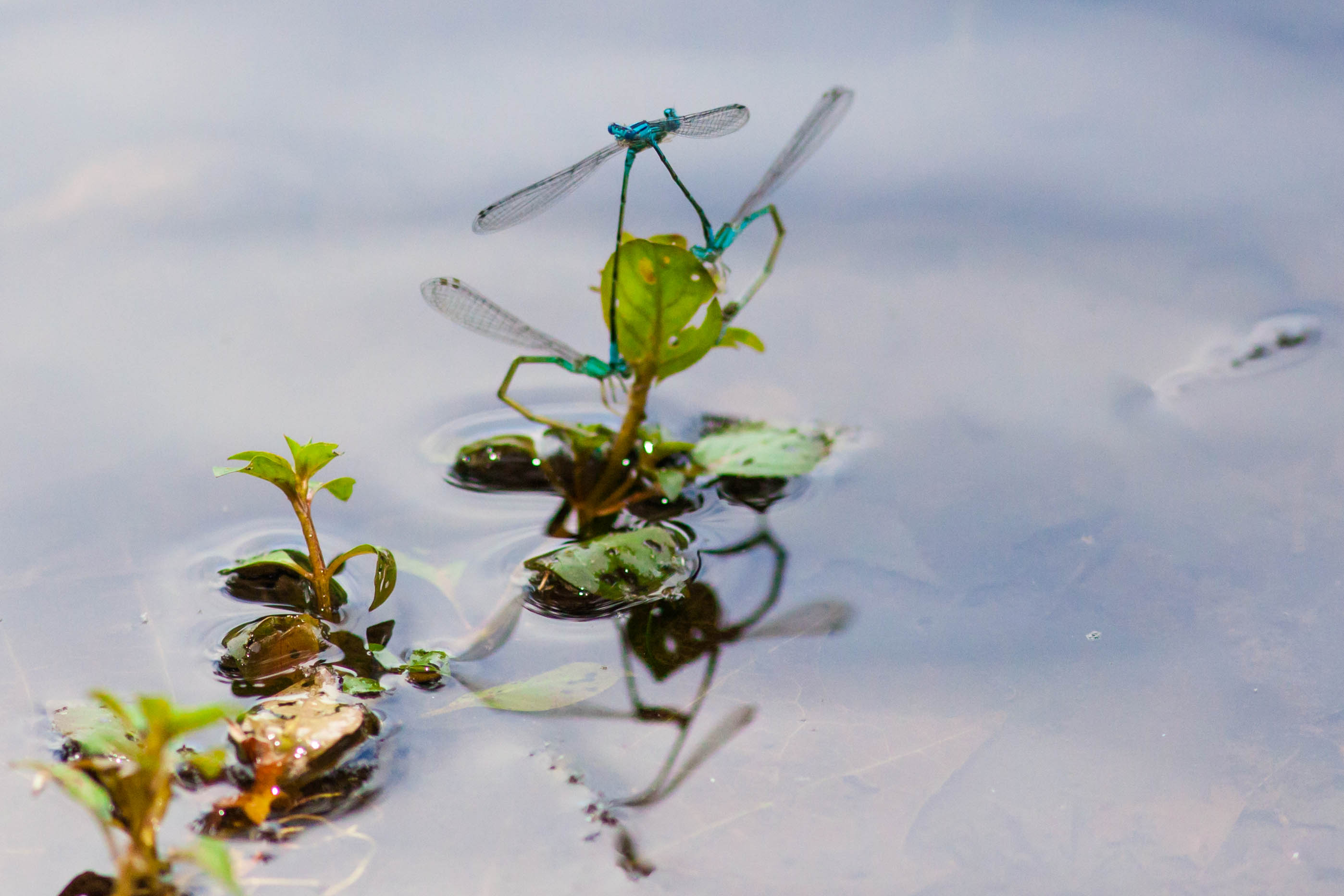
several turquoise bluets on vegetation
