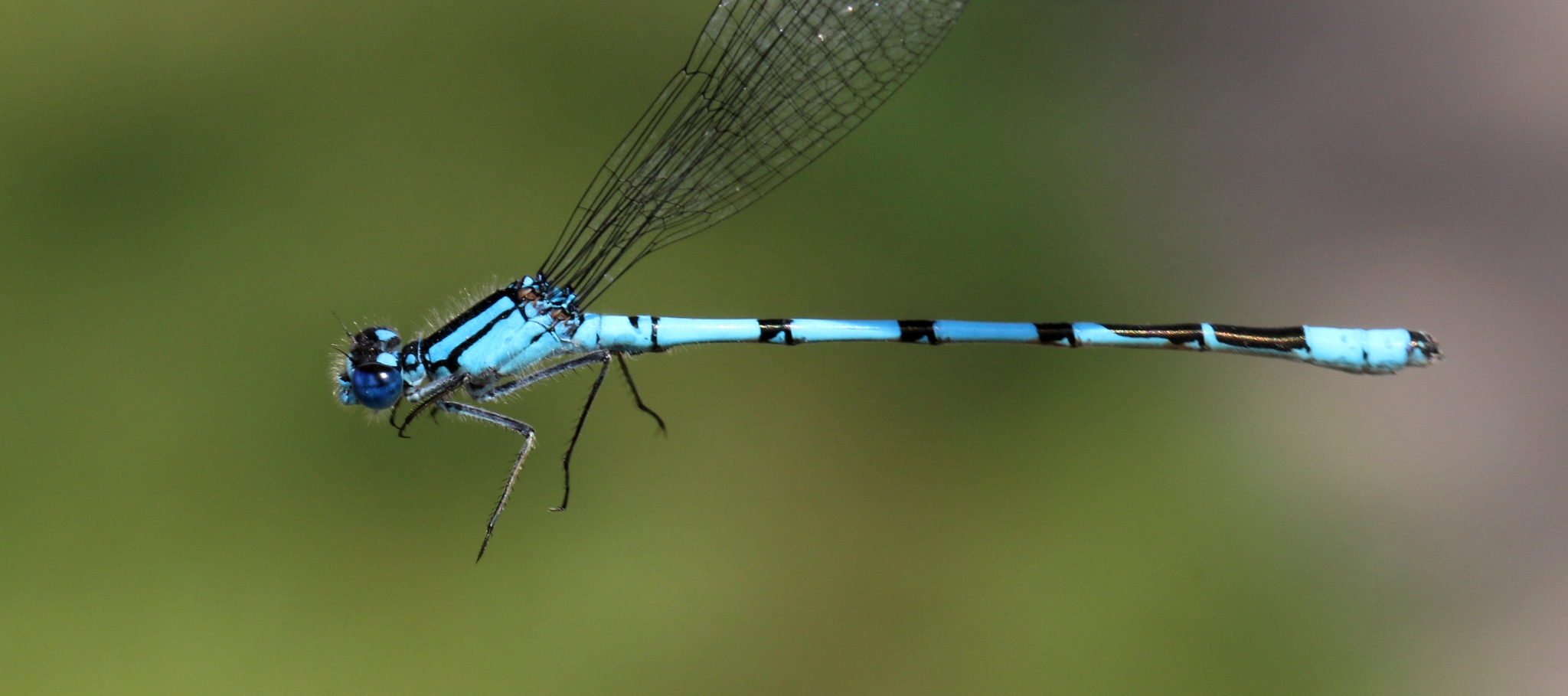

Scientific classification
- Kingdom: Animalia
- Phylum: Arthropoda
- Class: Insecta
- Order: Odonata
- Suborder: Zygoptera
- Family: Coenagrionidae
- Genus: Enallagma
- Species: E. vernale

Binomial name
- Enallagma vernale Gloyd, 1943

Synonyms
- Enallagma cyathigerum vernale Gloyd, 1943

= Enallagma vernale =

Species of damselfly

Enallagma vernale, the vernal bluet, is a species of narrow-winged damselfly in the family Coenagrionidae. It is found in North America.

The IUCN conservation status of Enallagma vernale is "LC", least concern, with no immediate threat to the species' survival. The population is stable.
