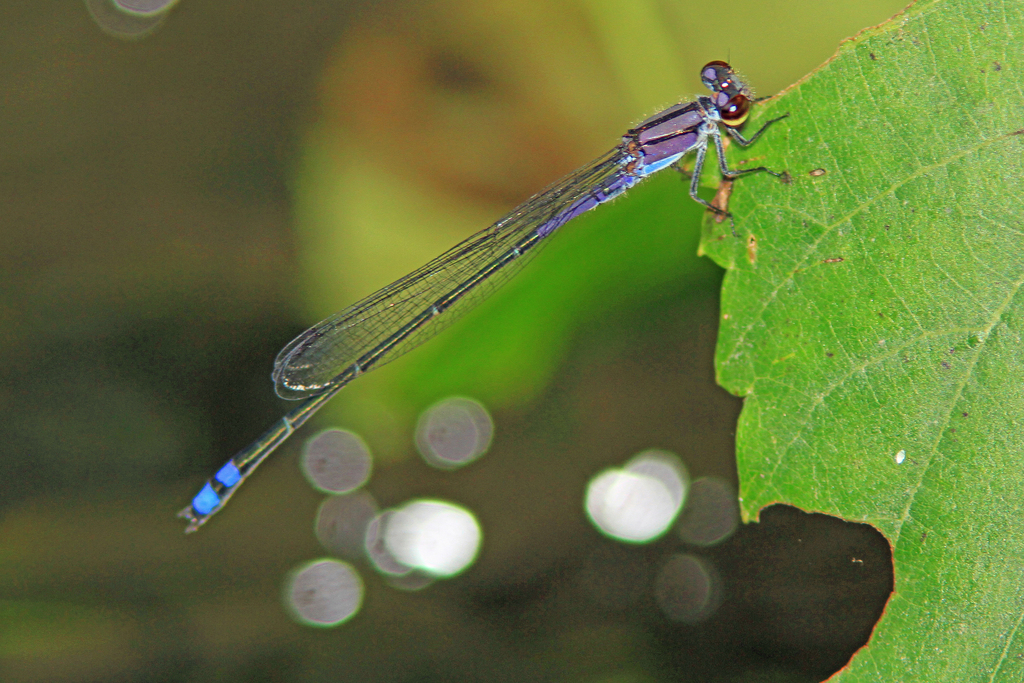

Conservation status
- Least Concern (IUCN 3.1)

Scientific classification
- Kingdom: Animalia
- Phylum: Arthropoda
- Class: Insecta
- Order: Odonata
- Suborder: Zygoptera
- Family: Coenagrionidae
- Genus: Enallagma
- Species: E. novaehispaniae

Binomial name
- Enallagma novaehispaniae Calvert, 1907

= Enallagma novaehispaniae =

Species of damselfly

Enallagma novaehispaniae, the neotropical bluet, is a species of narrow-winged damselfly in the family Coenagrionidae. It is found in Central America, North America, and South America.

The IUCN conservation status of Enallagma novaehispaniae is "least concern", with no immediate threat to the species' survival. The population is stable. The IUCN status was reviewed in 2017.
