= SS Hispania =

SS Hispania was the name of a number of steamships.

- SS Hispania (1912), a ship which sank in the Sound of Mull on 18 December 1954
- SS Hispania (1943), a Willem H Müller ship launched as Empire Beaconsfield

See also

- MS Hispania, a Swedish Lloyd ferry in service from 1969 to 1972
