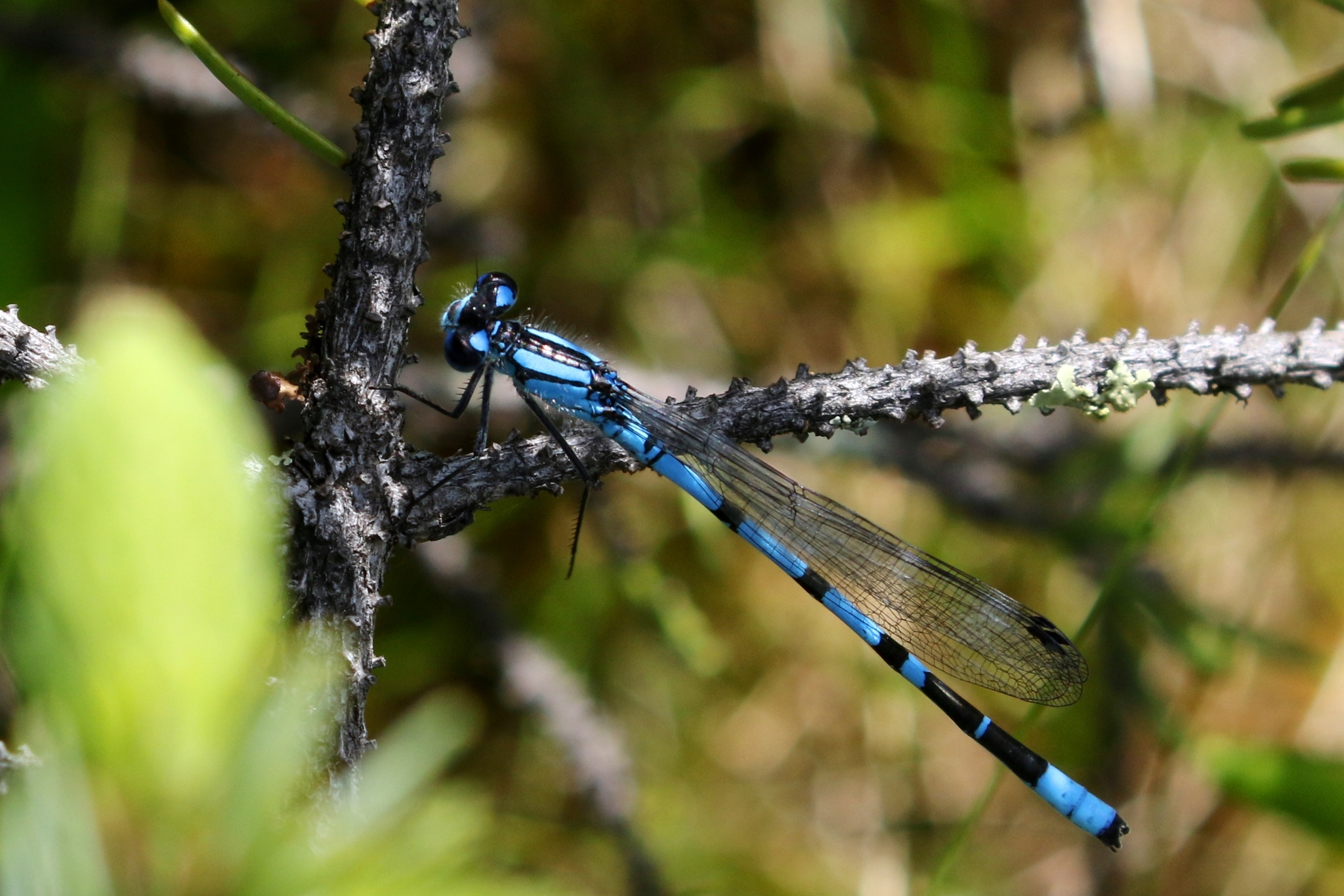

Conservation status
- Least Concern (IUCN 3.1)

Scientific classification
- Kingdom: Animalia
- Phylum: Arthropoda
- Clade: Pancrustacea
- Class: Insecta
- Order: Odonata
- Suborder: Zygoptera
- Family: Coenagrionidae
- Genus: Enallagma
- Species: E. boreale

Binomial name
- Enallagma boreale (Selys, 1875)

Synonyms
- Enallagma calverti Morse, 1895

= Boreal bluet =

Species of damselfly

The boreal bluet (Enallagma boreale) is a species of damselfly in the family Coenagrionidae.
