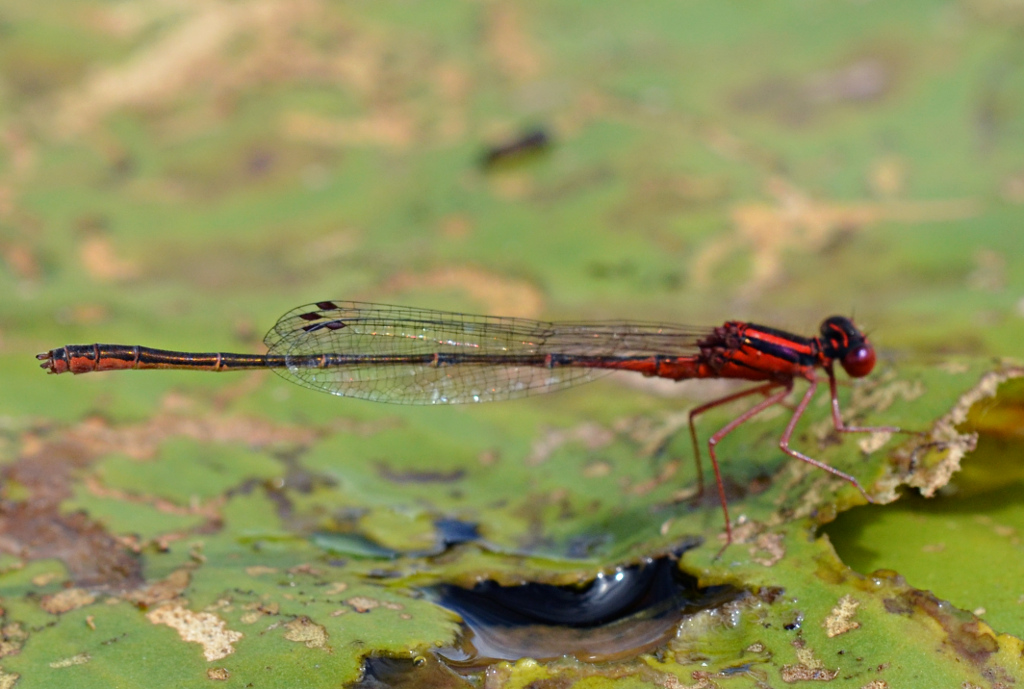
- Male, Cranberry Lake, New Brunswick

Conservation status
- Least Concern (IUCN 3.1)

Scientific classification
- Kingdom: Animalia
- Phylum: Arthropoda
- Clade: Pancrustacea
- Class: Insecta
- Order: Odonata
- Suborder: Zygoptera
- Family: Coenagrionidae
- Genus: Enallagma
- Species: E. pictum

Binomial name
- Enallagma pictum Morse, 1895

= Enallagma pictum =

Species of damselfly

Enallagma pictum, the scarlet bluet, is a species of damselfly in the family Coenagrionidae. They are found from New Brunswick, Canada to Maryland.

== Identification ==
The scarlet bluet is a damselfly with a length of 29.5–30.5 mm (1.16–1.20 in) long. The male is predominantly red and black while the female is light green and black.

== Flight season ==
Scarlet bluets have a flight season of mid May to September depending on range.
