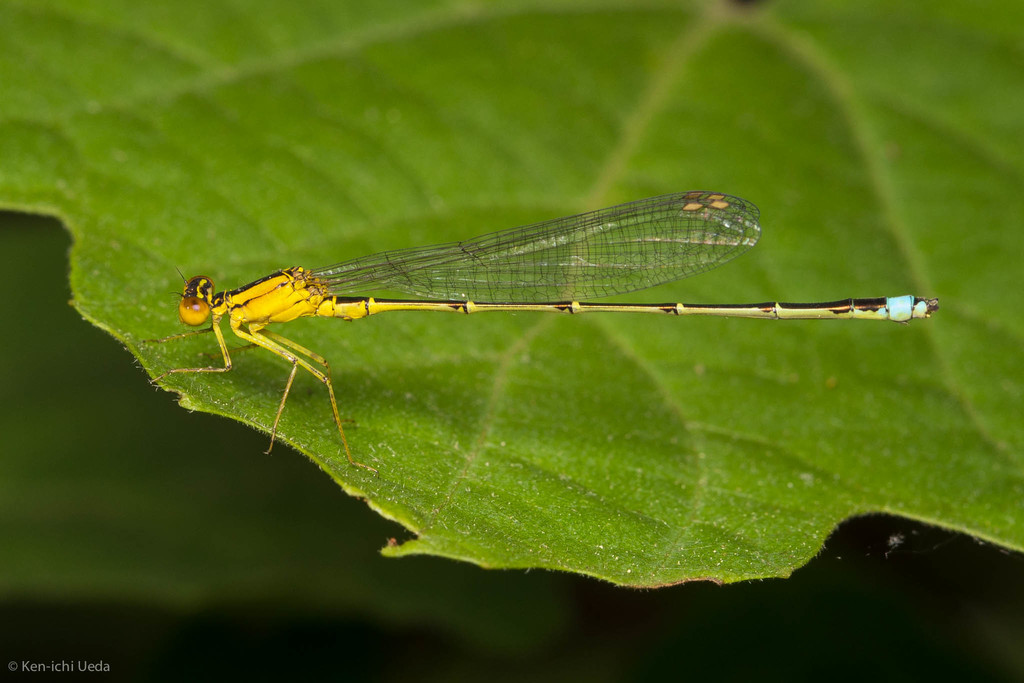

Conservation status
- Least Concern (IUCN 3.1)

Scientific classification
- Kingdom: Animalia
- Phylum: Arthropoda
- Class: Insecta
- Order: Odonata
- Suborder: Zygoptera
- Family: Coenagrionidae
- Genus: Enallagma
- Species: E. vesperum

Binomial name
- Enallagma vesperum Calvert, 1919

= Enallagma vesperum =

Species of damselfly

Enallagma vesperum, the vesper bluet, is a species of narrow-winged damselfly in the family Coenagrionidae. It is found in southern Canada and central and eastern United States.

The IUCN conservation status of Enallagma vesperum is "least concern", with no immediate threat to the species' survival. The population is stable.
