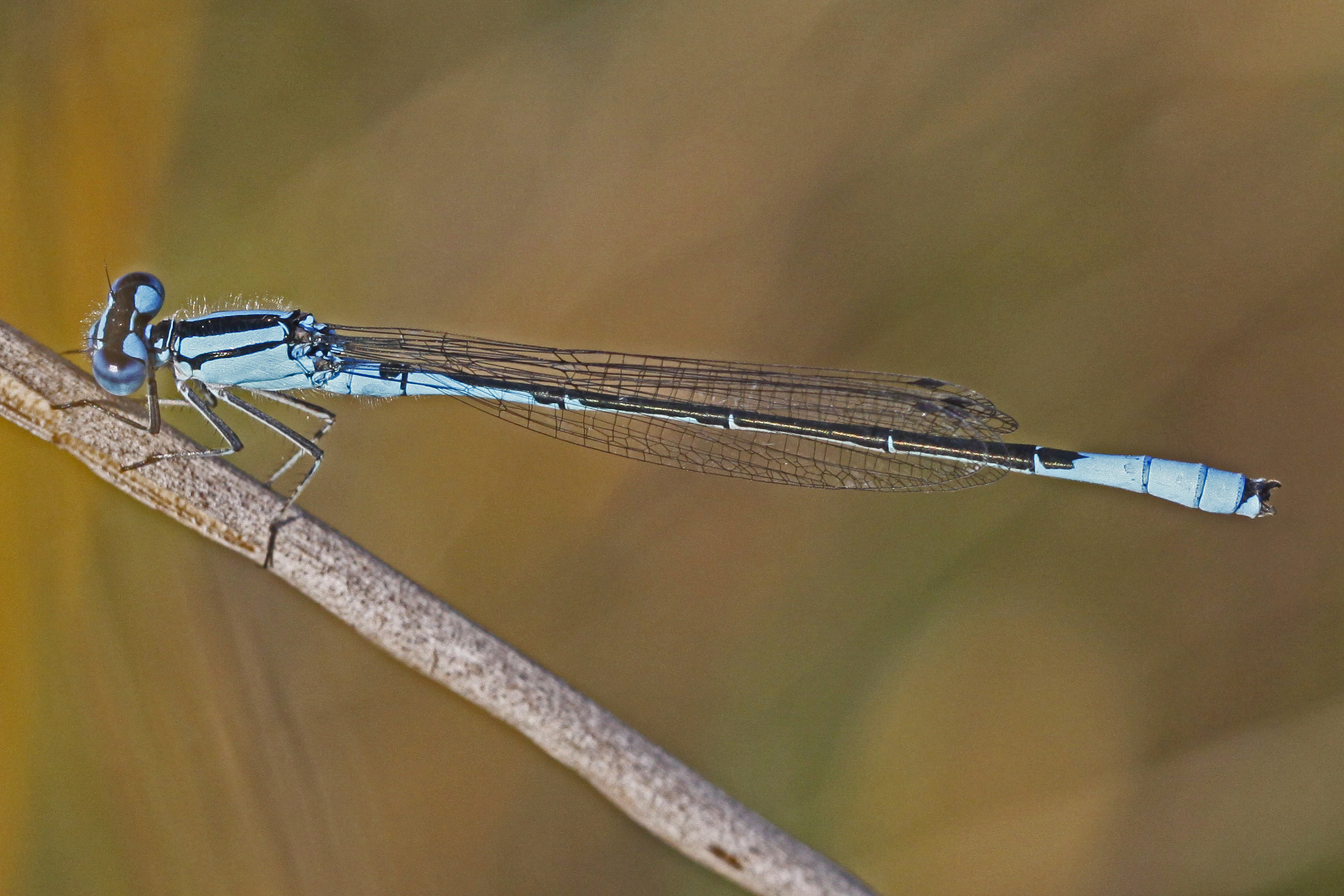

Conservation status
- Least Concern (IUCN 3.1)

Scientific classification
- Kingdom: Animalia
- Phylum: Arthropoda
- Clade: Pancrustacea
- Class: Insecta
- Order: Odonata
- Suborder: Zygoptera
- Family: Coenagrionidae
- Genus: Enallagma
- Species: E. aspersum

Binomial name
- Enallagma aspersum (Hagen, 1861)

= Enallagma aspersum =

Species of damselfly

Enallagma aspersum, the azure bluet, is a species of narrow-winged damselfly in the family Coenagrionidae. It is found in North America in Canada and the United States.

The IUCN conservation status of Enallagma aspersum is "least concern", with no immediate threat to the species' survival. The population is stable.

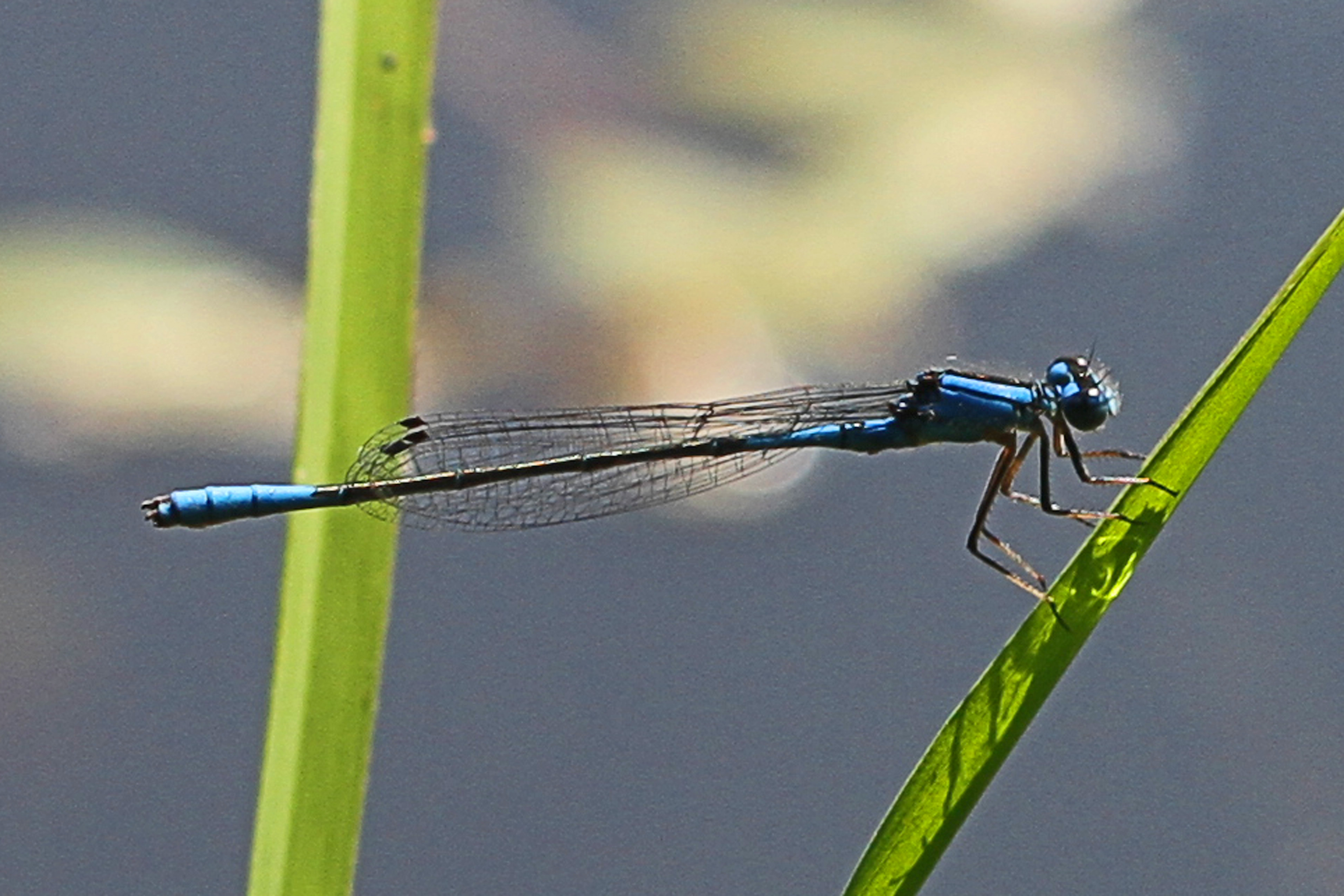
Azure bluet, Enallagma aspersum
