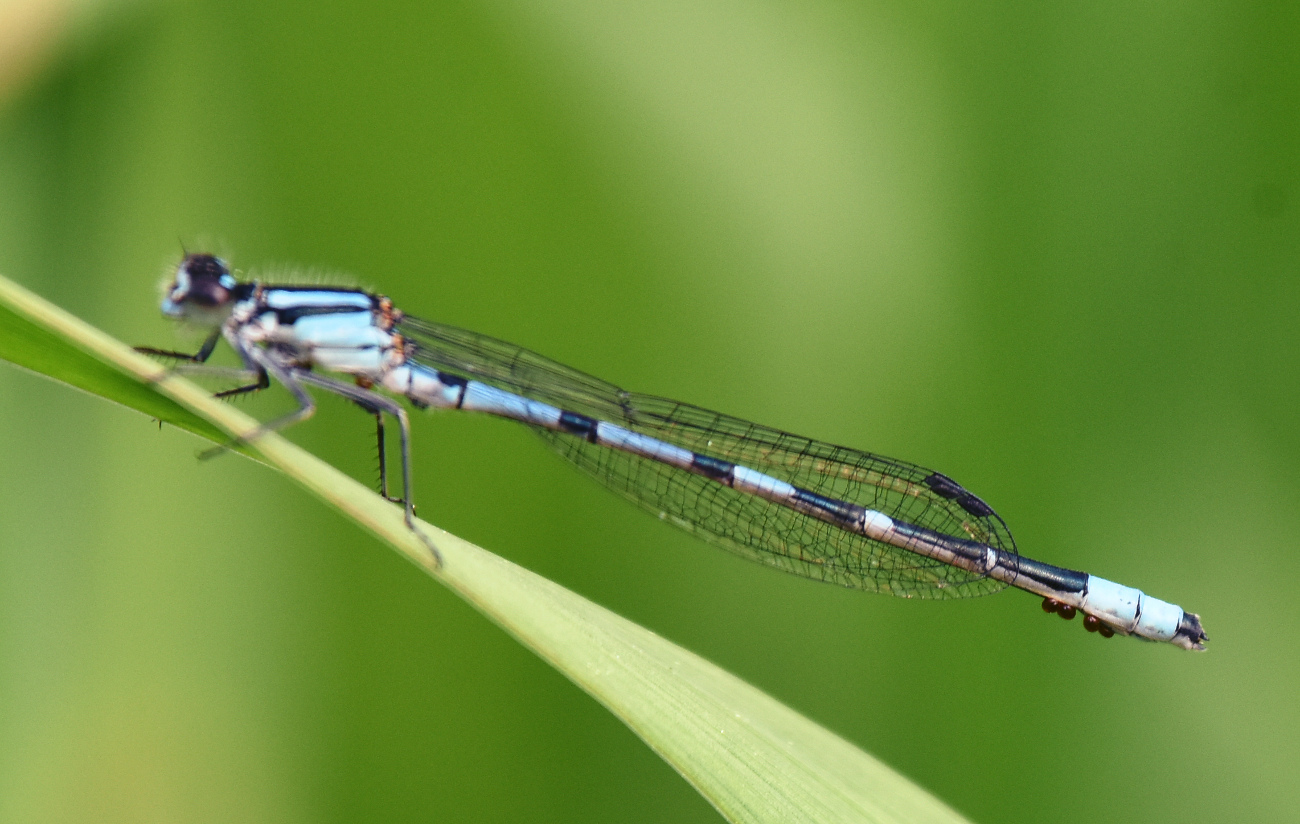

Conservation status
- Least Concern (IUCN 3.1)

Scientific classification
- Kingdom: Animalia
- Phylum: Arthropoda
- Class: Insecta
- Order: Odonata
- Suborder: Zygoptera
- Family: Coenagrionidae
- Genus: Enallagma
- Species: E. hageni

Binomial name
- Enallagma hageni (Walsh, 1863)

= Enallagma hageni =

Species of damselfly

Enallagma hageni, commonly known as Hagen's bluet, is a species of narrow-winged damselfly in the family Coenagrionidae. It is found in North America.

The IUCN conservation status of Enallagma hageni is "LC", least concern, with no immediate threat to the species' survival. The population is stable.
