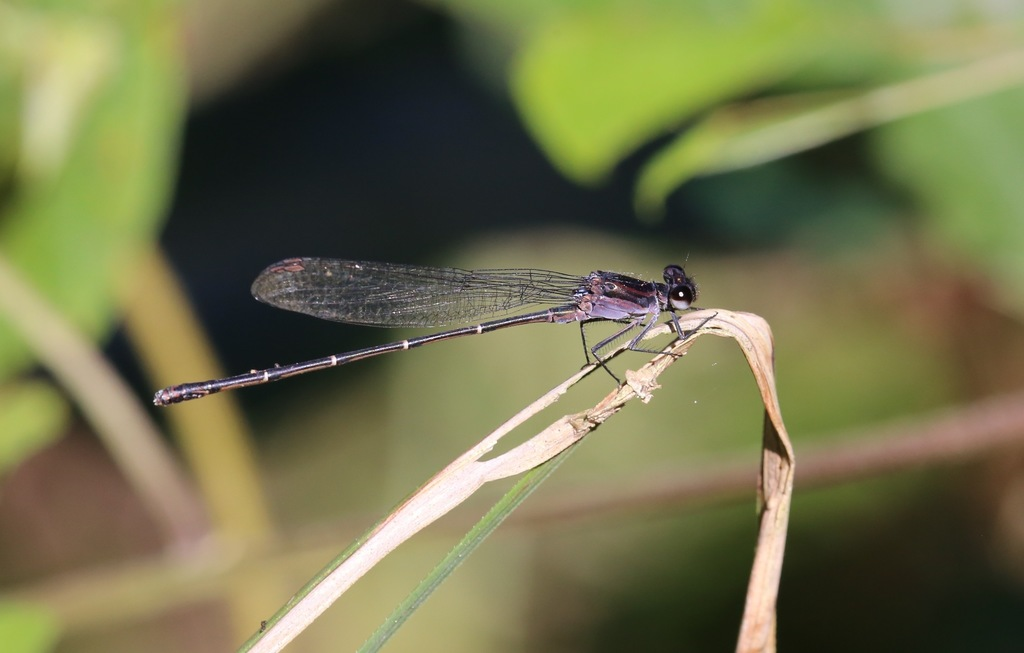

Conservation status
- Least Concern (IUCN 3.1)

Scientific classification
- Domain: Eukaryota
- Kingdom: Animalia
- Phylum: Arthropoda
- Class: Insecta
- Order: Odonata
- Suborder: Zygoptera
- Family: Coenagrionidae
- Genus: Argia
- Species: A. tezpi

Binomial name
- Argia tezpi Calvert, 1902

= Argia tezpi =

Species of damselfly

Argia tezpi, the tezpi dancer, is a species of narrow-winged damselfly in the family Coenagrionidae. It is found in Central America and North America.

The IUCN conservation status of Argia tezpi is "LC", least concern, with no immediate threat to the species' survival. The population is stable.
