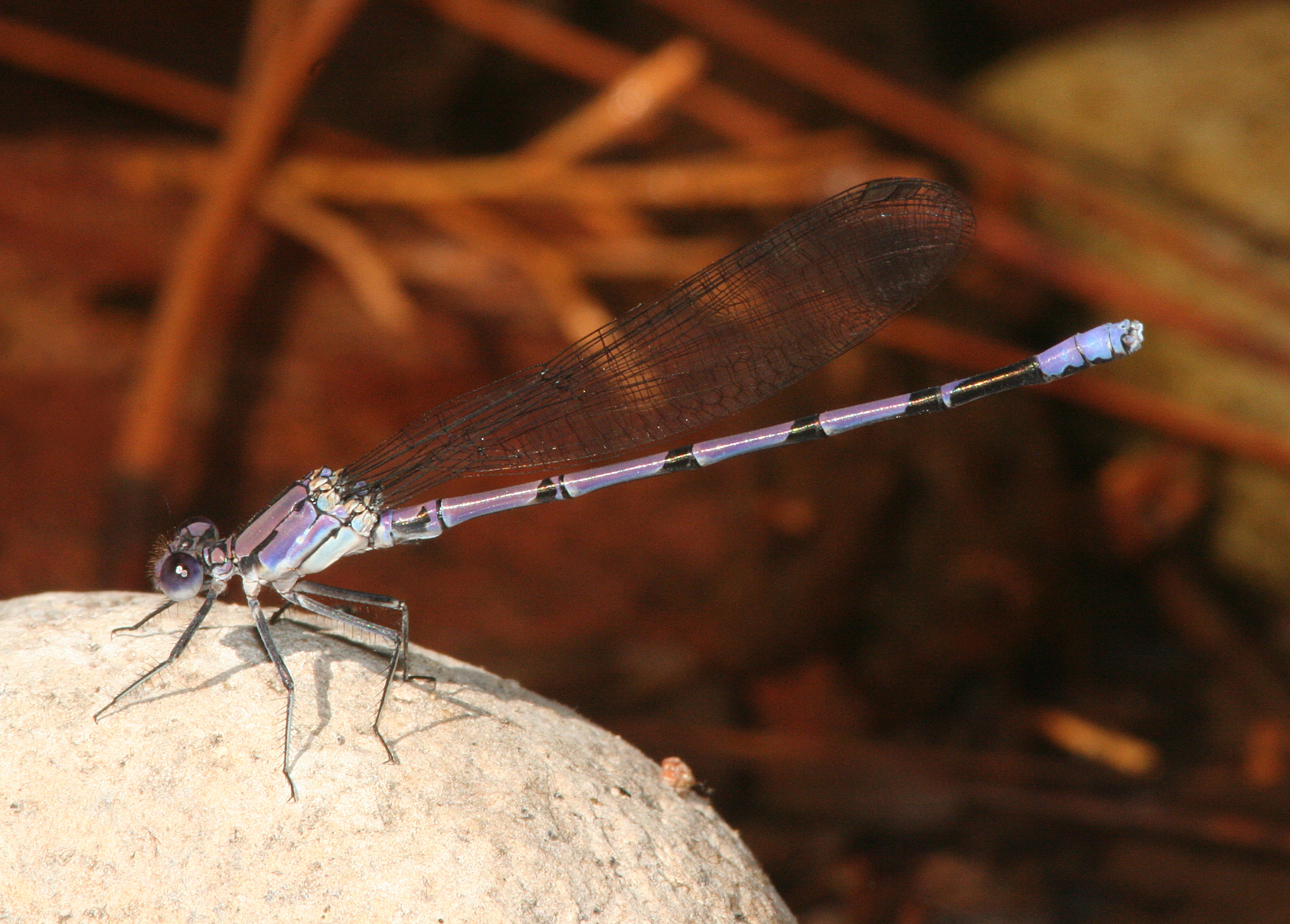

Conservation status
- Least Concern (IUCN 3.1)

Scientific classification
- Domain: Eukaryota
- Kingdom: Animalia
- Phylum: Arthropoda
- Class: Insecta
- Order: Odonata
- Suborder: Zygoptera
- Family: Coenagrionidae
- Genus: Argia
- Species: A. tonto

Binomial name
- Argia tonto Calvert, 1902

= Argia tonto =

Species of damselfly

Argia tonto, the Tonto dancer, is a species of narrow-winged damselfly in the family Coenagrionidae. It is found in Central America and North America.

The IUCN conservation status of Argia tonto is "LC", least concern, with no immediate threat to the species' survival. The population is stable.
