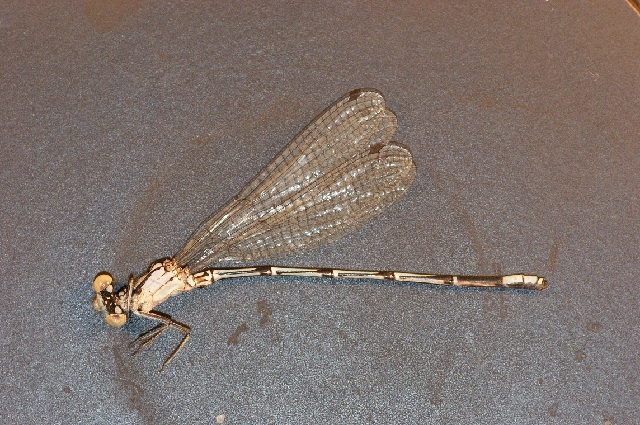

Conservation status
- Least Concern (IUCN 3.1)

Scientific classification
- Domain: Eukaryota
- Kingdom: Animalia
- Phylum: Arthropoda
- Class: Insecta
- Order: Odonata
- Suborder: Zygoptera
- Family: Coenagrionidae
- Genus: Argia
- Species: A. barretti

Binomial name
- Argia barretti Calvert, 1902

= Argia barretti =

Species of damselfly

Argia barretti, the Comanche dancer, is a species of narrow-winged damselfly in the family Coenagrionidae. It is found in Central America and North America.

The IUCN conservation status of Argia barretti is "LC", least concern, with no immediate threat to the species' survival. The population is stable.
