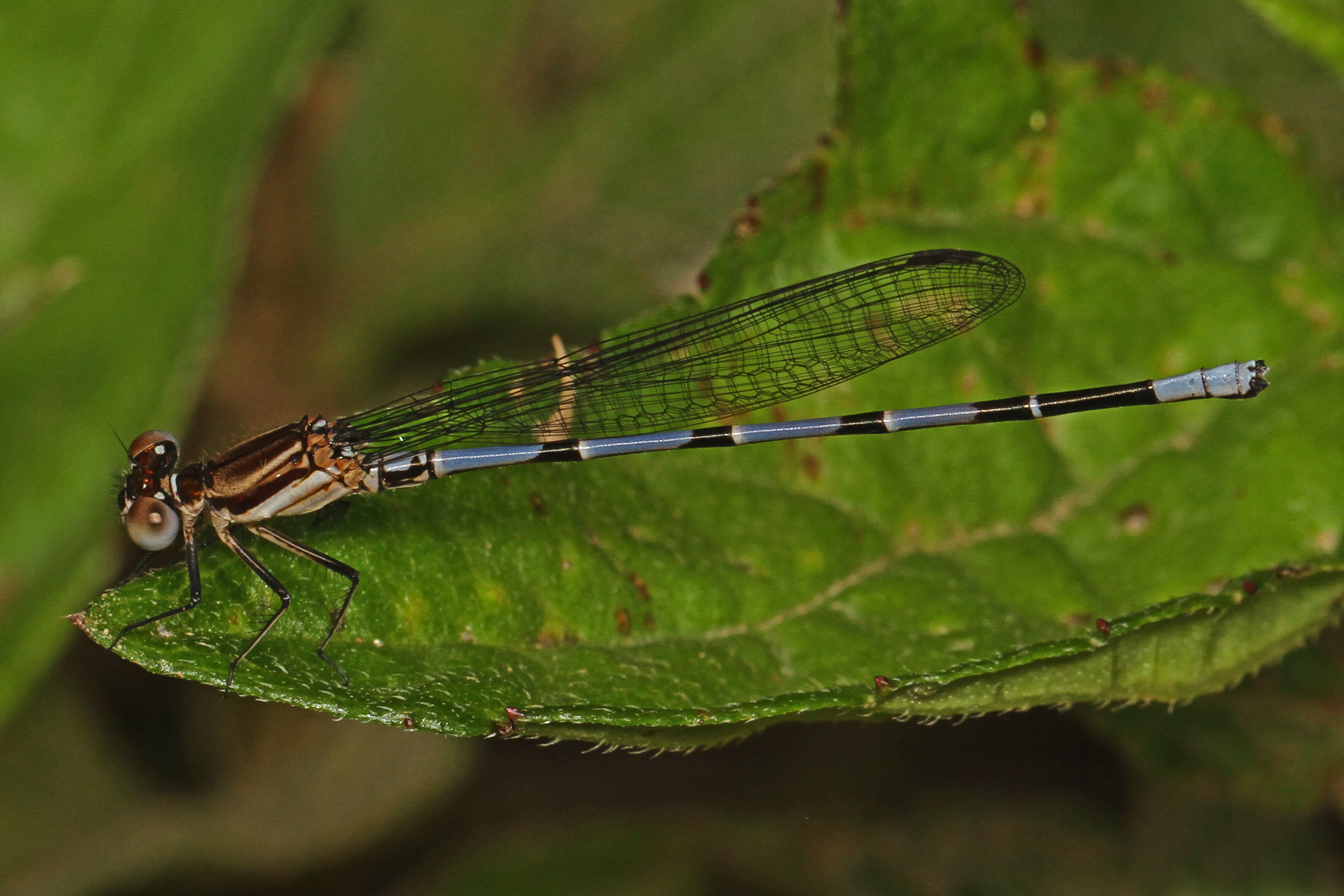

Conservation status
- Least Concern (IUCN 3.1)

Scientific classification
- Domain: Eukaryota
- Kingdom: Animalia
- Phylum: Arthropoda
- Class: Insecta
- Order: Odonata
- Suborder: Zygoptera
- Family: Coenagrionidae
- Genus: Argia
- Species: A. oenea

Binomial name
- Argia oenea Hagen in Selys, 1865

= Argia oenea =

Species of damselfly

Argia oenea, the fiery-eyed dancer, is a species of narrow-winged damselfly in the family Coenagrionidae. It is found in Central America and North America.

The IUCN conservation status of Argia oenea is "LC", least concern, with no immediate threat to the species' survival. The population is stable.
