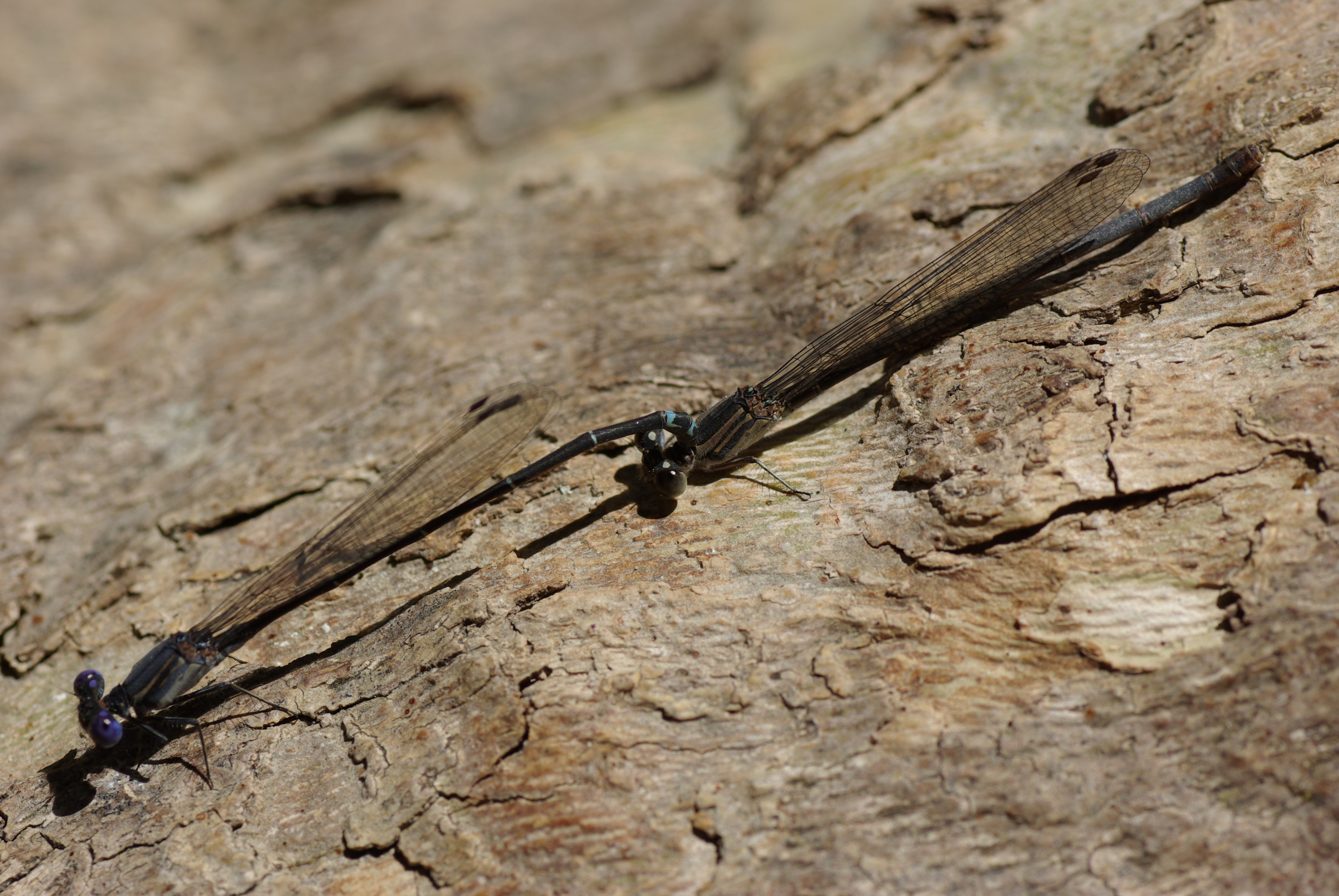

Scientific classification
- Domain: Eukaryota
- Kingdom: Animalia
- Phylum: Arthropoda
- Class: Insecta
- Order: Odonata
- Suborder: Zygoptera
- Family: Coenagrionidae
- Genus: Argia
- Species: A. translata

Binomial name
- Argia translata Hagen in Selys, 1865

= Dusky dancer =

Species of damselfly

The dusky dancer (Argia translata) is a damselfly of the family Coenagrionidae, native to eastern and southern North America.
