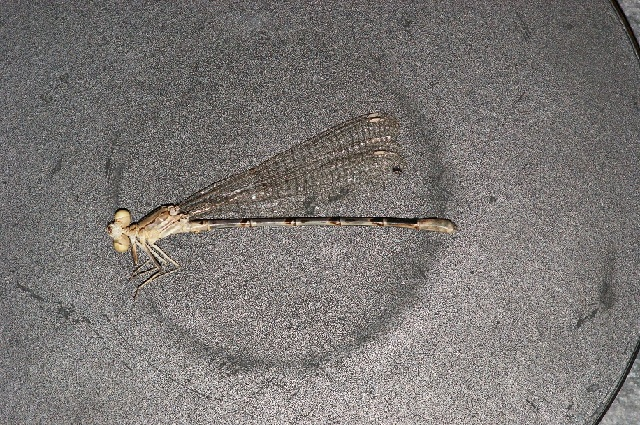

Conservation status
- Least Concern (IUCN 3.1)

Scientific classification
- Domain: Eukaryota
- Kingdom: Animalia
- Phylum: Arthropoda
- Class: Insecta
- Order: Odonata
- Suborder: Zygoptera
- Family: Coenagrionidae
- Genus: Argia
- Species: A. munda

Binomial name
- Argia munda Calvert, 1902

= Argia munda =

Species of damselfly

Argia munda, the Apache dancer, is a species of narrow-winged damselfly in the family Coenagrionidae. It is found in Central America and North America.

The IUCN conservation status of Argia munda is "LC", least concern, with no immediate threat to the species' survival. The population is stable.
