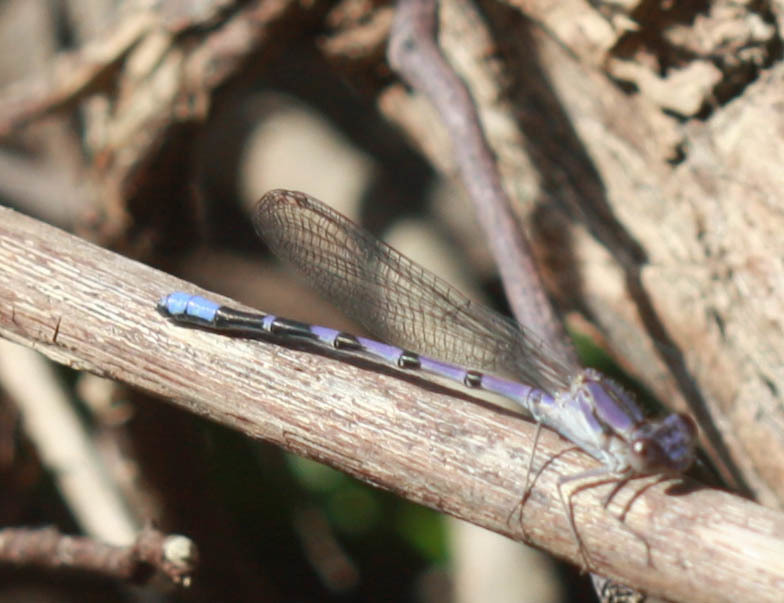

Conservation status
- Least Concern (IUCN 3.1)

Scientific classification
- Domain: Eukaryota
- Kingdom: Animalia
- Phylum: Arthropoda
- Class: Insecta
- Order: Odonata
- Suborder: Zygoptera
- Family: Coenagrionidae
- Genus: Argia
- Species: A. emma

Binomial name
- Argia emma Kennedy, 1915

= Argia emma =

Species of damselfly

Argia emma, or Emma's dancer, is a species of narrow-winged damselfly in the family Coenagrionidae. It is found in North America.

The IUCN conservation status of Argia emma is "LC", least concern, with no immediate threat to the species' survival. The population is stable.
