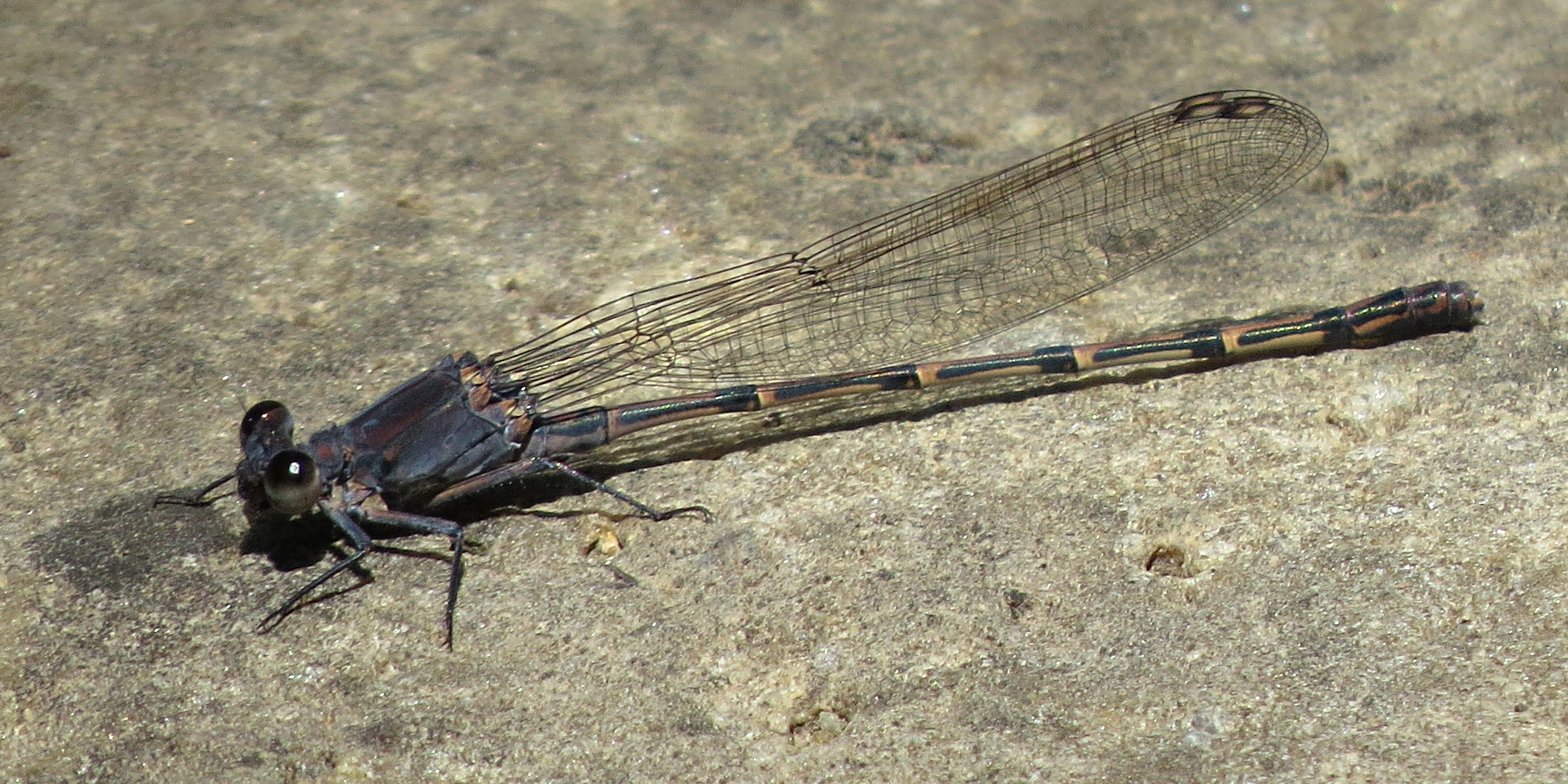

Conservation status
- Least Concern (IUCN 3.1)

Scientific classification
- Domain: Eukaryota
- Kingdom: Animalia
- Phylum: Arthropoda
- Class: Insecta
- Order: Odonata
- Suborder: Zygoptera
- Family: Coenagrionidae
- Genus: Argia
- Species: A. lugens

Binomial name
- Argia lugens (Hagen, 1861)

= Argia lugens =

Species of damselfly

Argia lugens, the sooty dancer, is a species of narrow-winged damselfly in the family Coenagrionidae. It is found in Central America and North America.

The IUCN conservation status of Argia lugens is "LC", least concern, with no immediate threat to the species' survival. The population is stable.

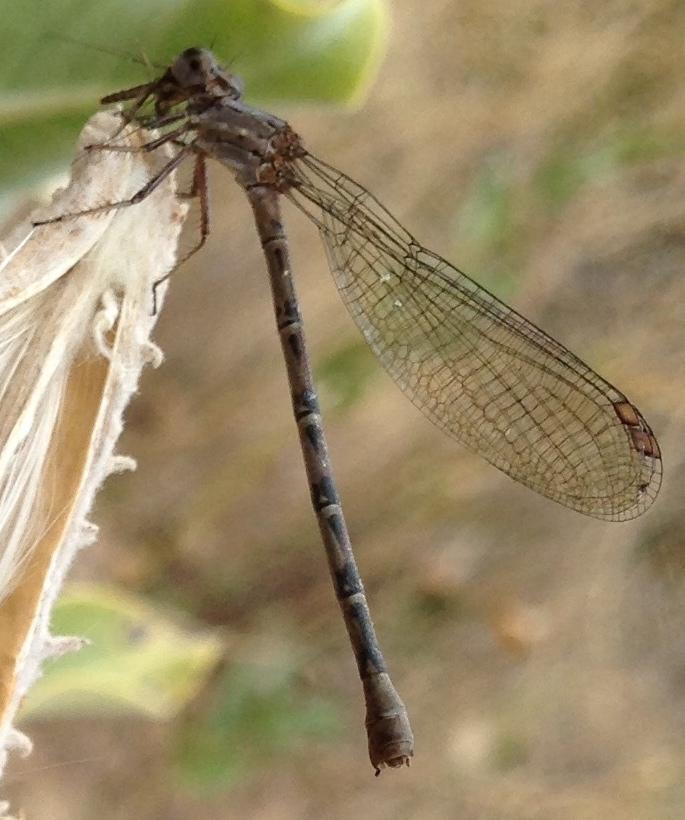
Sooty dancer, Argia lugens

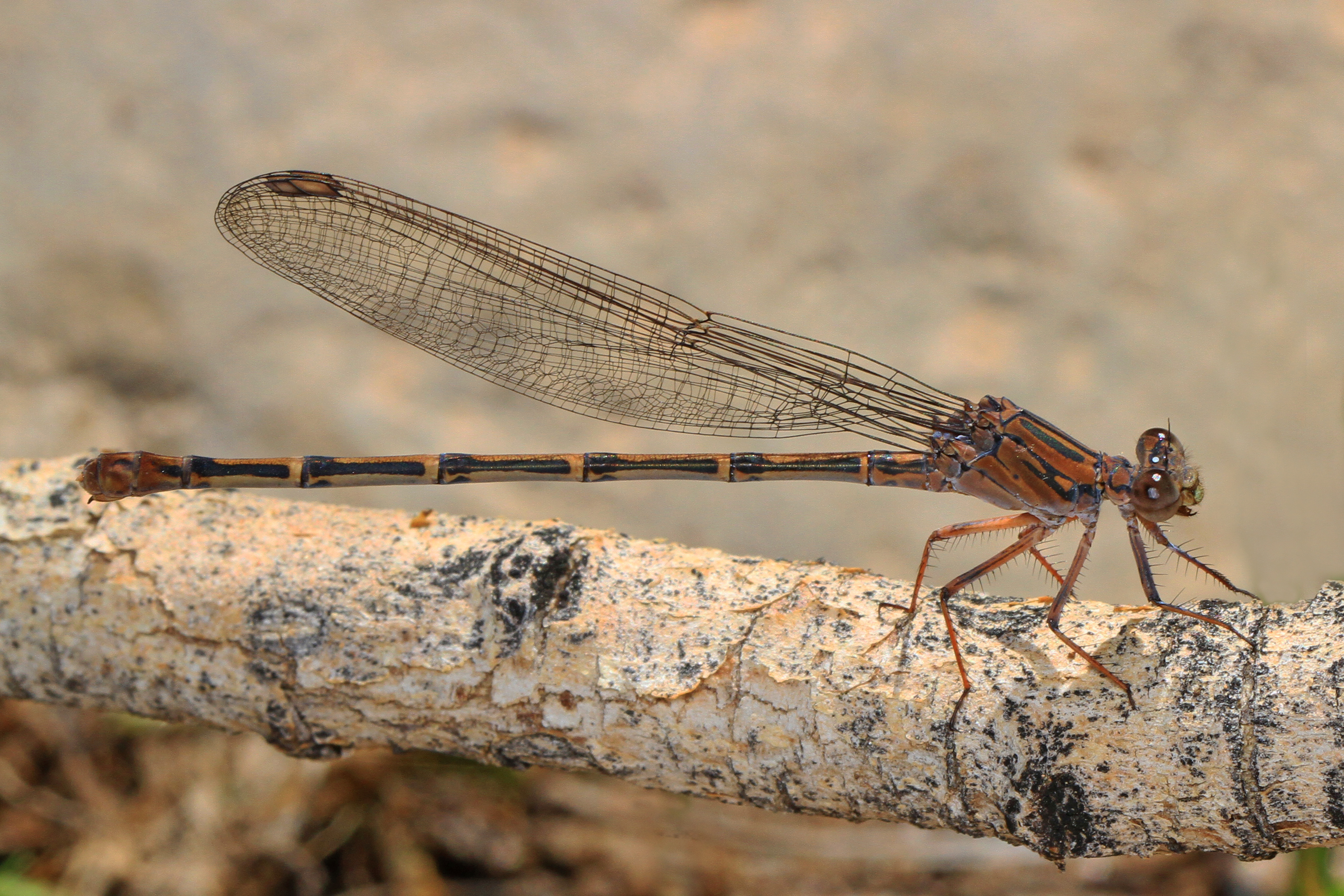
Sooty dancer, Argia lugens
