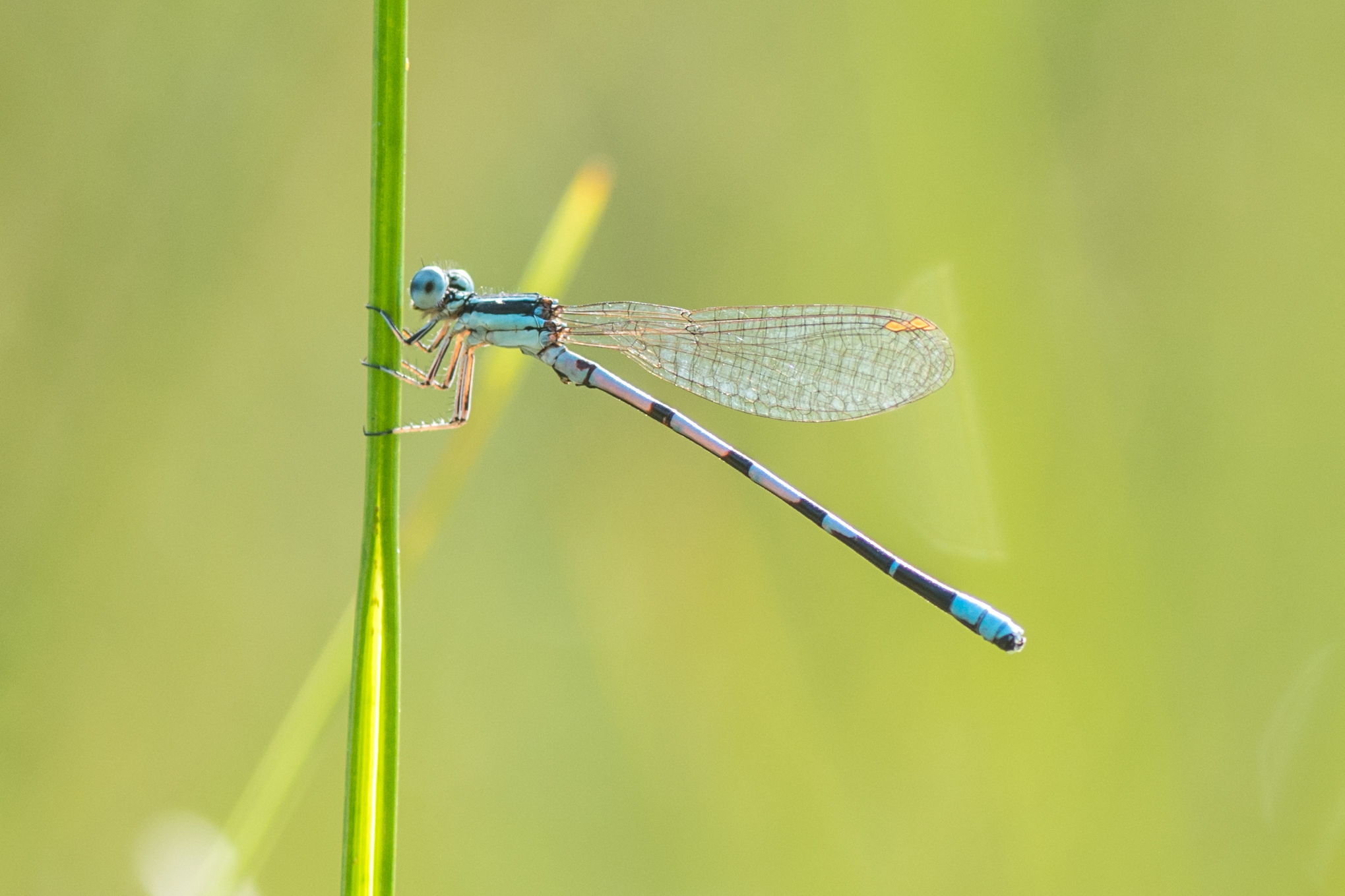

Conservation status
- Least Concern (IUCN 3.1)

Scientific classification
- Domain: Eukaryota
- Kingdom: Animalia
- Phylum: Arthropoda
- Class: Insecta
- Order: Odonata
- Suborder: Zygoptera
- Family: Coenagrionidae
- Genus: Argia
- Species: A. bipunctulata

Binomial name
- Argia bipunctulata (Hagen, 1861)

= Argia bipunctulata =

Species of damselfly

Argia bipunctulata, the seepage dancer, is a species of narrow-winged damselfly in the family Coenagrionidae. It is found in North America.

The IUCN conservation status of Argia bipunctulata is "LC", least concern, with no immediate threat to the species' survival. The population is stable.

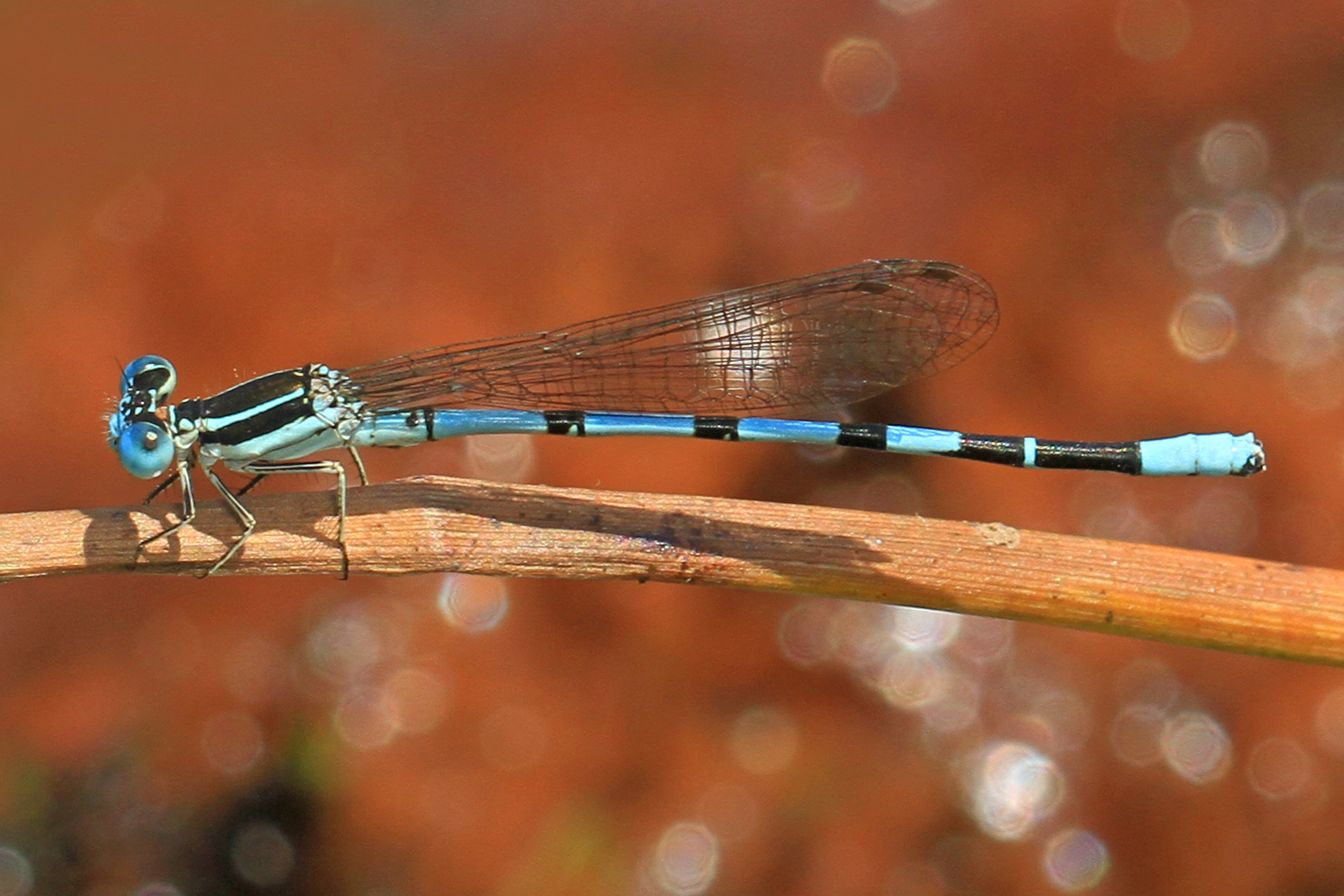
Seepage dancer, Argia bipunctulata

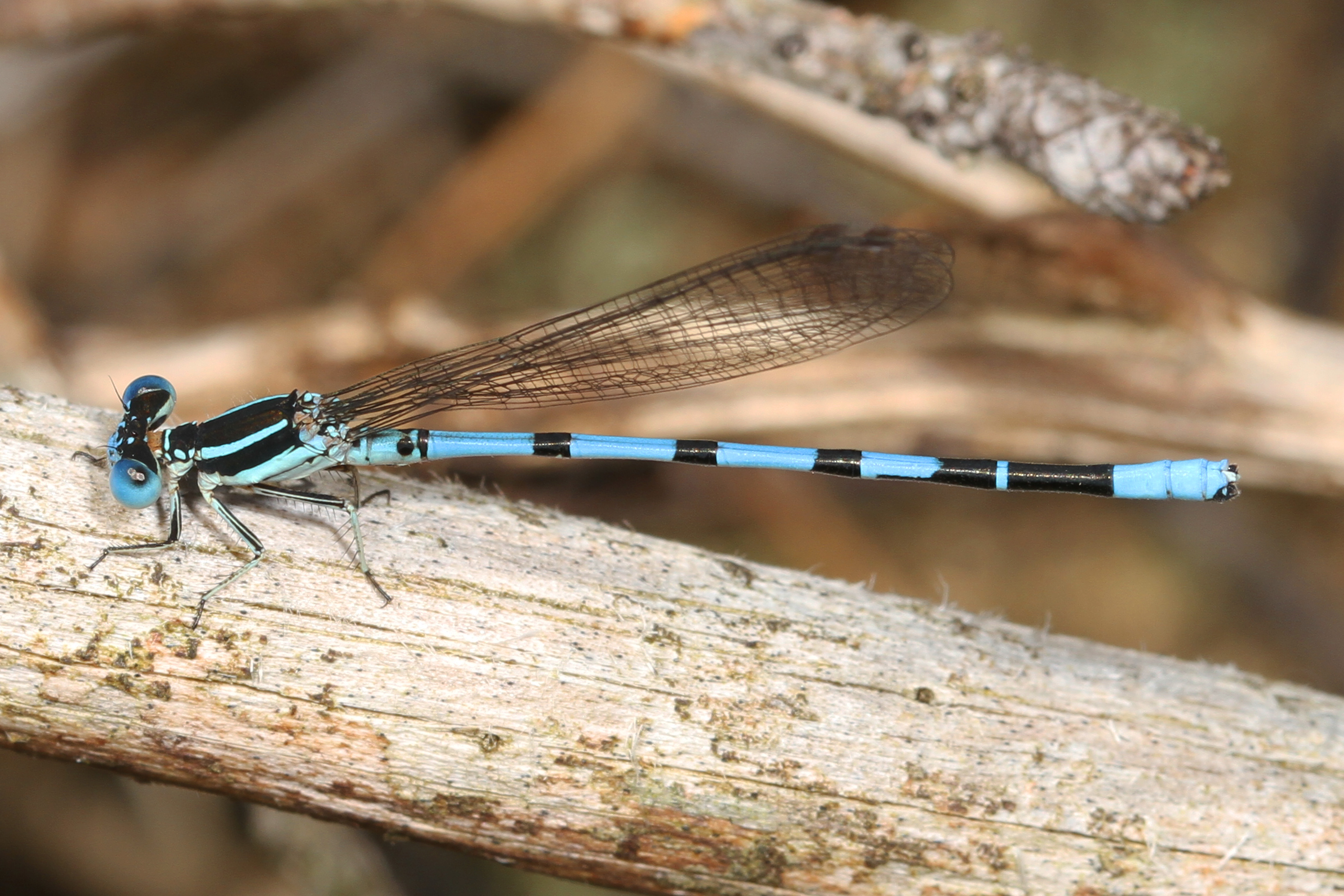
Seepage dancer, Argia bipunctulata
