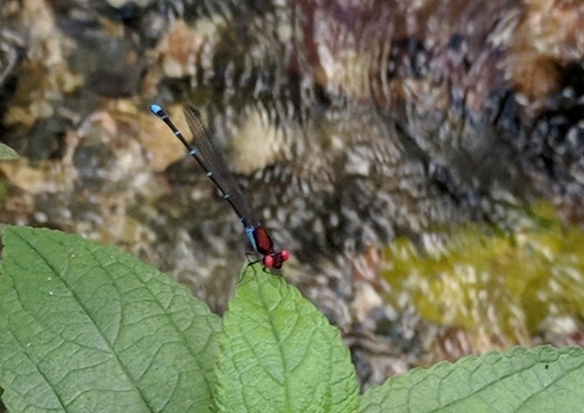

Conservation status
- Least Concern (IUCN 3.1)

Scientific classification
- Kingdom: Animalia
- Phylum: Arthropoda
- Class: Insecta
- Order: Odonata
- Suborder: Zygoptera
- Family: Coenagrionidae
- Genus: Argia
- Species: A. cuprea

Binomial name
- Argia cuprea (Hagen, 1861)

= Argia cuprea =

Species of damselfly

Argia cuprea, the coppery dancer, is a species of narrow-winged damselfly in the family Coenagrionidae. It is found in Central America, North America, and South America.

The IUCN conservation status of Argia cuprea is "LC", least concern, with no immediate threat to the species' survival. The population is stable. The IUCN status was reviewed in 2018.
