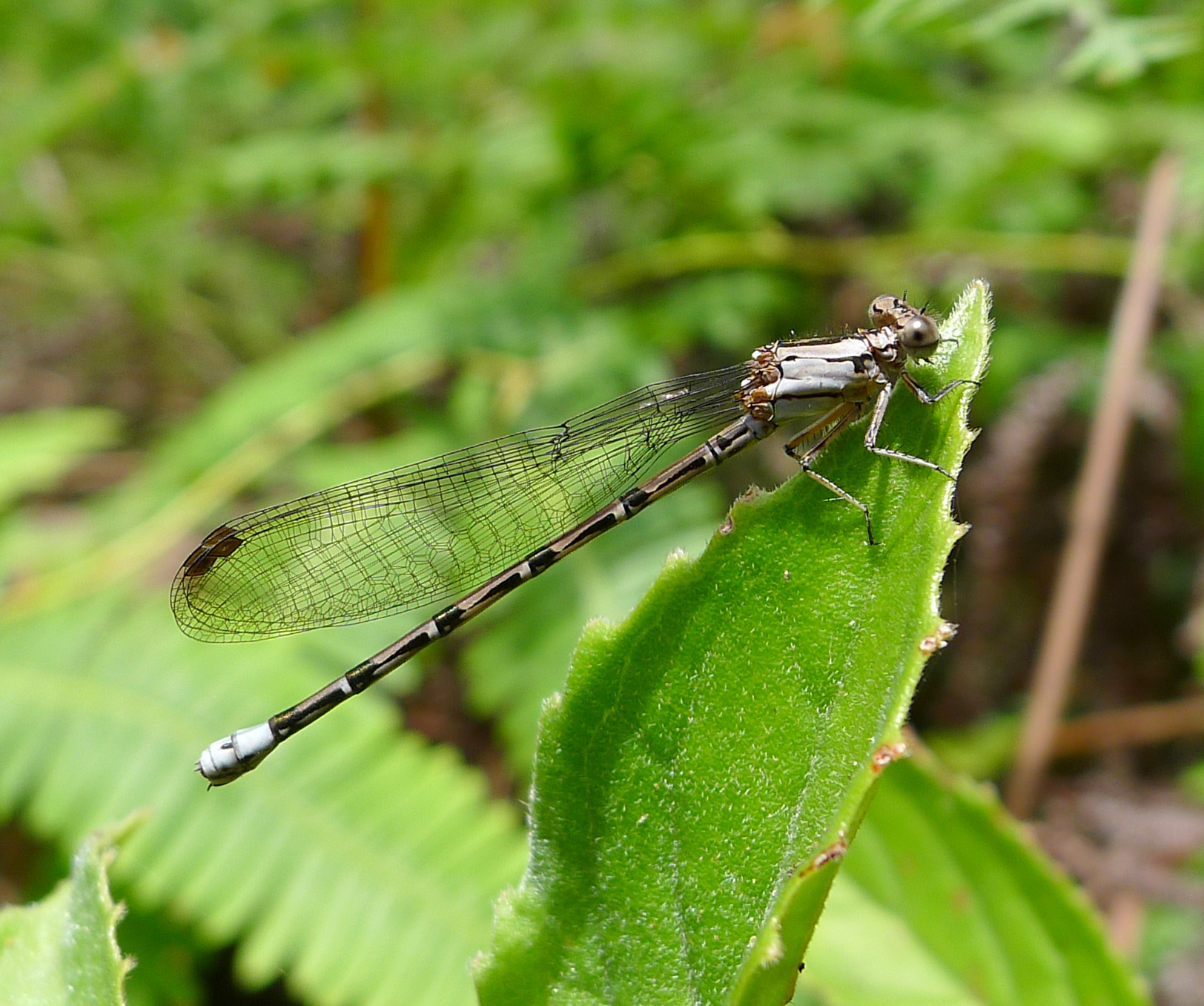

Conservation status
- Least Concern (IUCN 3.1)

Scientific classification
- Domain: Eukaryota
- Kingdom: Animalia
- Phylum: Arthropoda
- Class: Insecta
- Order: Odonata
- Suborder: Zygoptera
- Family: Coenagrionidae
- Genus: Argia
- Species: A. extranea

Binomial name
- Argia extranea (Hagen, 1861)

= Argia extranea =

Species of damselfly

Argia extranea, the spine-tipped dancer, is a species of narrow-winged damselfly in the family Coenagrionidae. It is found in the Americas.

The IUCN conservation status of Argia extranea is "LC", least concern, with no immediate threat to the species' survival. The population is stable.

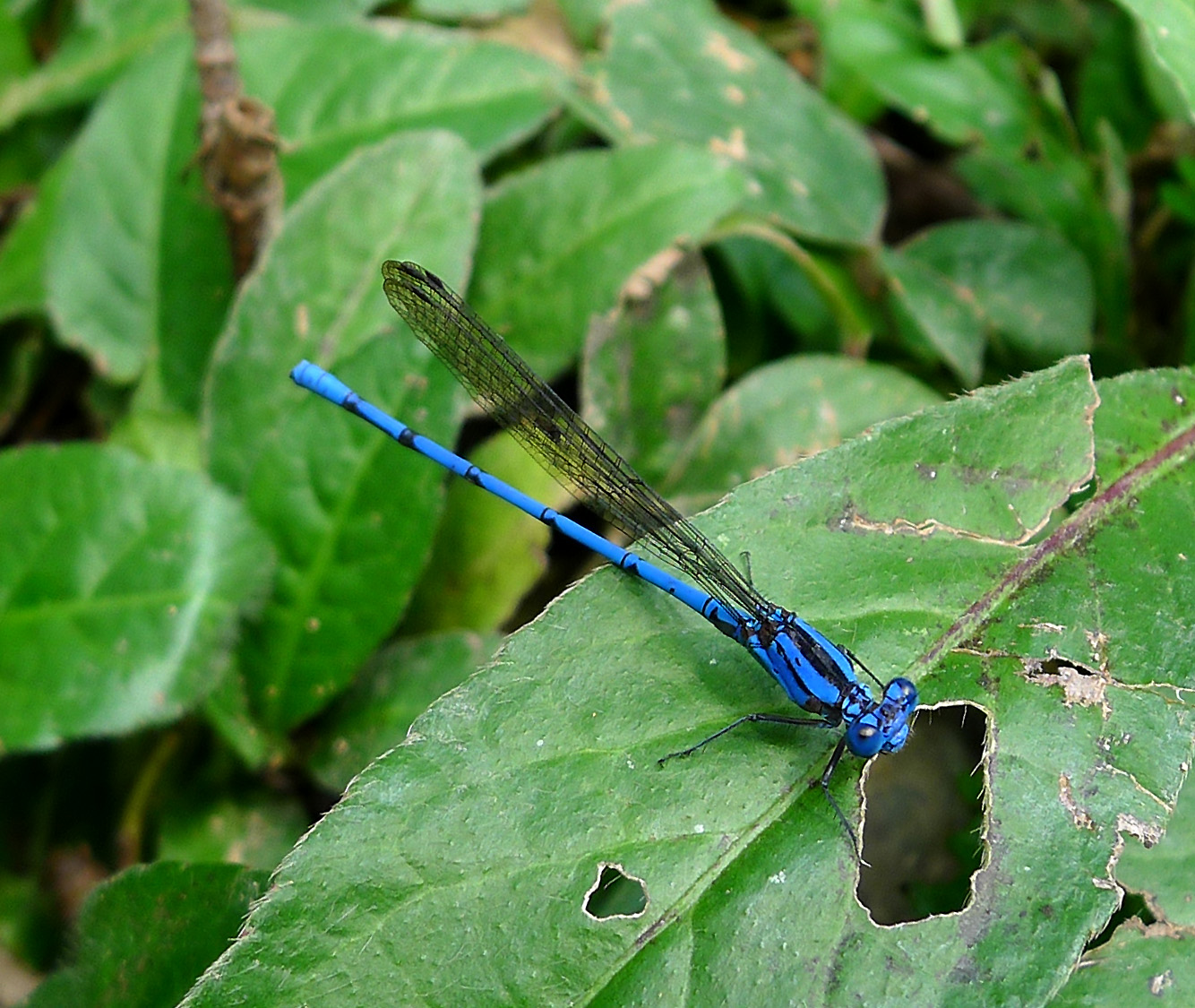
Spine-tipped dancer, Argia extranea

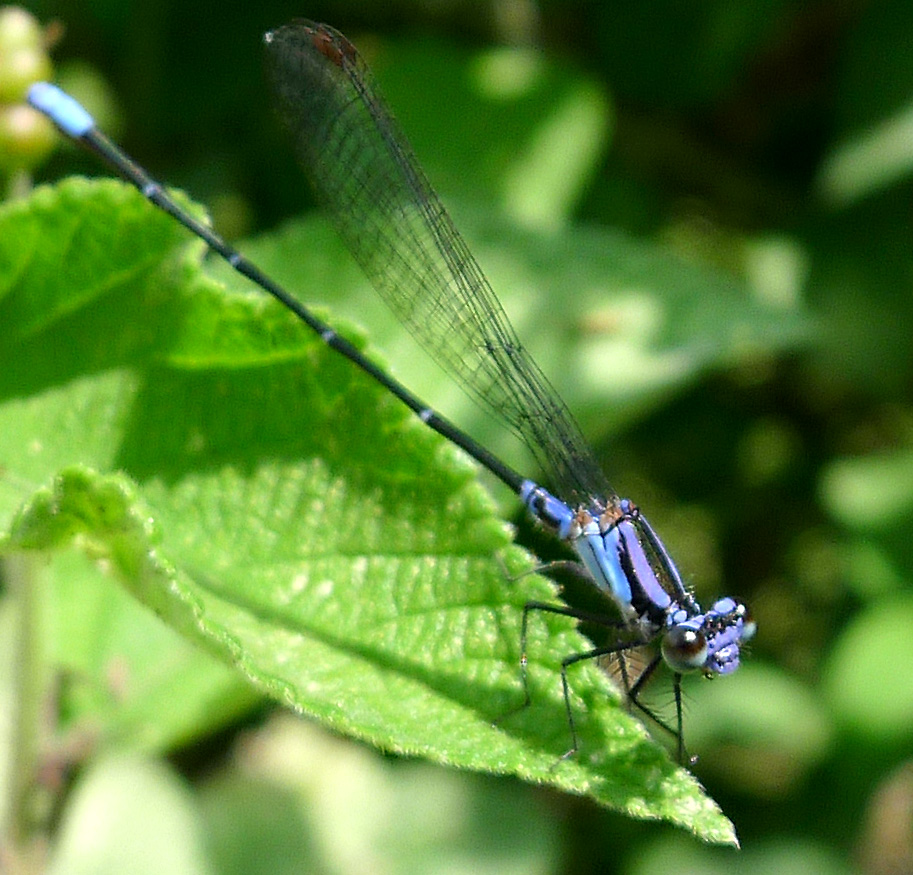
Spine-tipped dancer, Argia extranea
