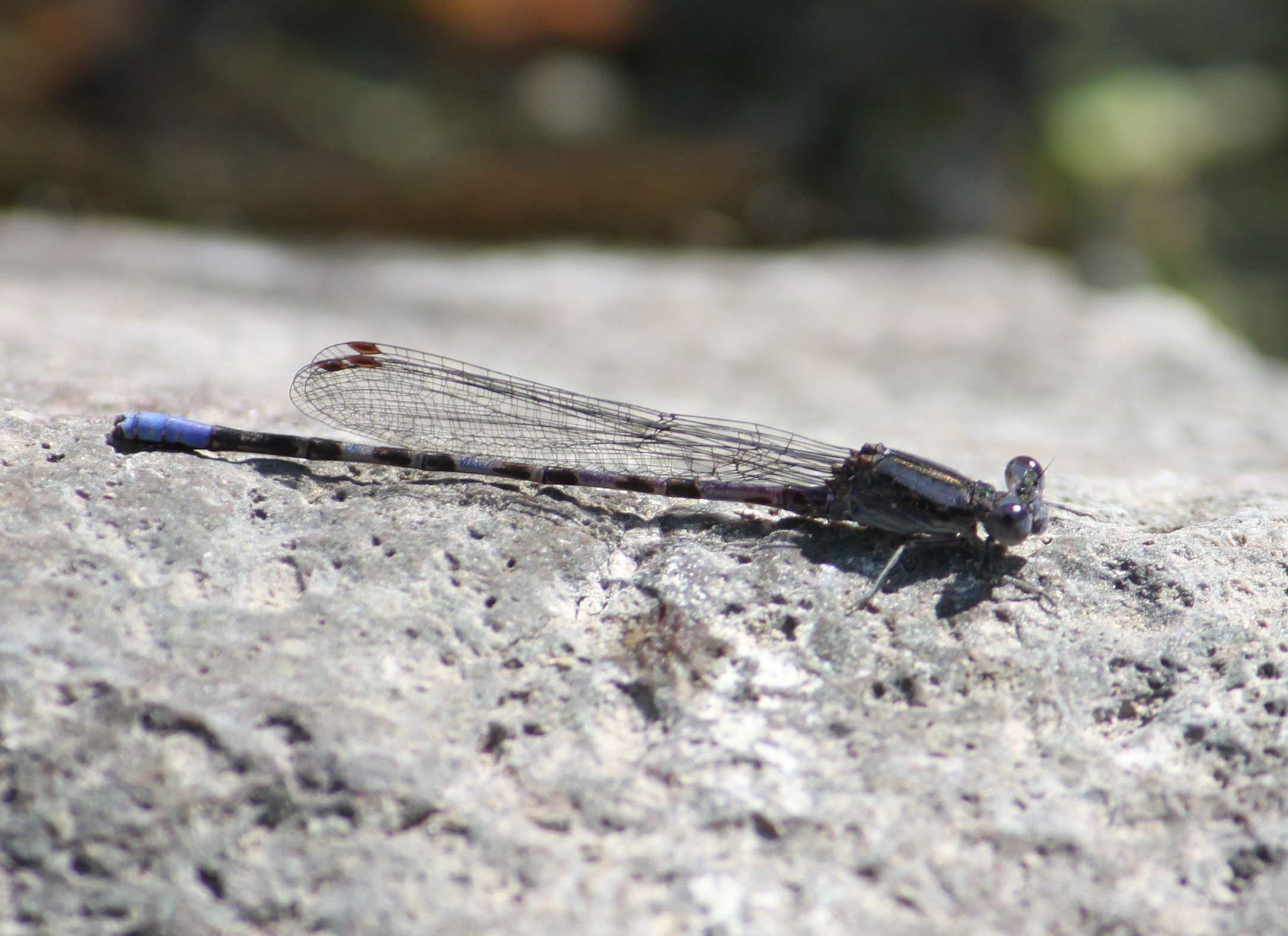

Conservation status
- Least Concern (IUCN 3.1)

Scientific classification
- Domain: Eukaryota
- Kingdom: Animalia
- Phylum: Arthropoda
- Class: Insecta
- Order: Odonata
- Suborder: Zygoptera
- Family: Coenagrionidae
- Genus: Argia
- Species: A. immunda

Binomial name
- Argia immunda (Hagen, 1861)

= Argia immunda =

Species of damselfly

Argia immunda, the Kiowa dancer, is a species of narrow-winged damselfly in the family Coenagrionidae. It is found in Central America and North America.

The IUCN conservation status of Argia immunda is "LC", least concern, with no immediate threat to the species' survival. The population is stable.

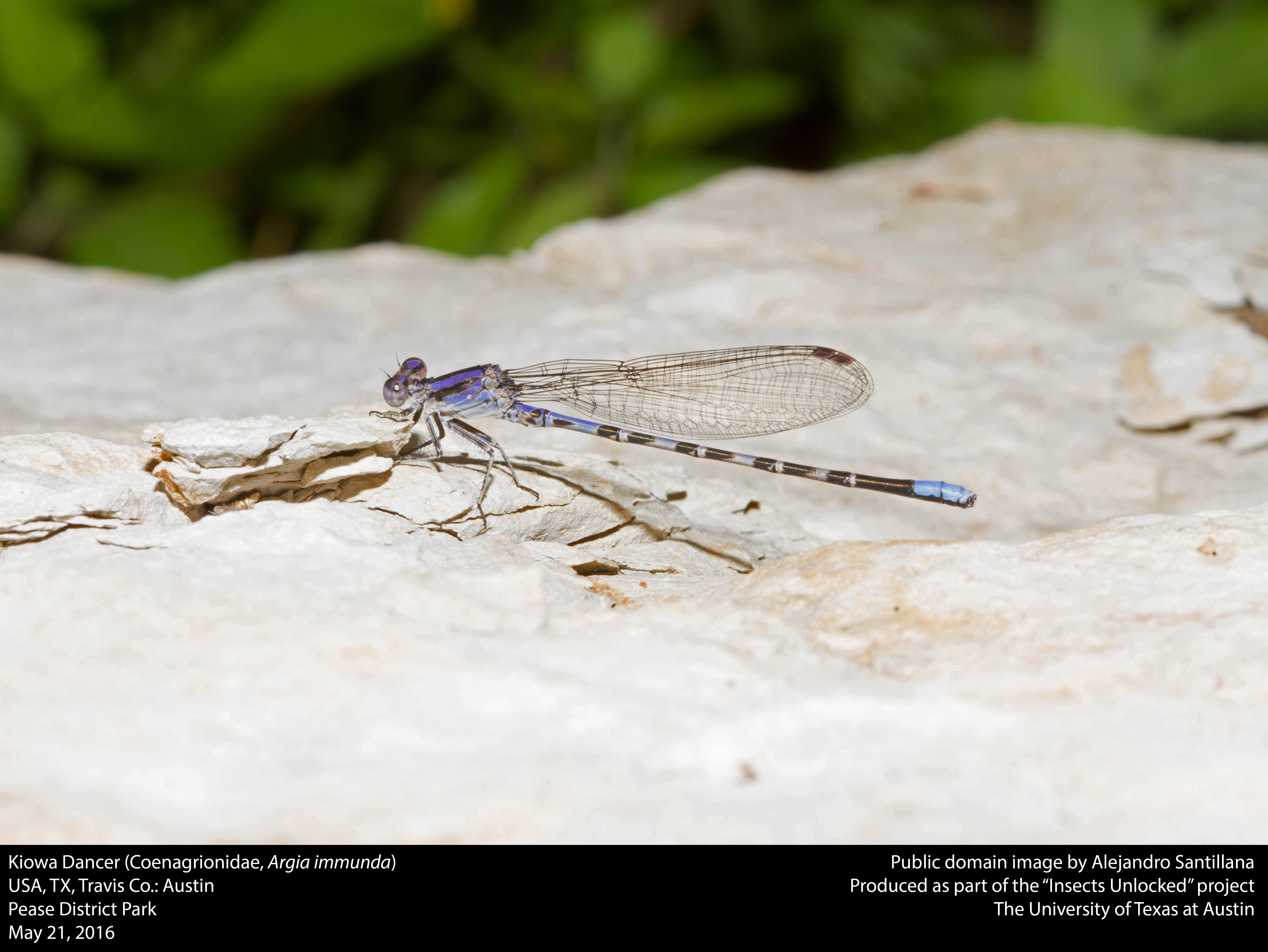
Kiowa dancer, Argia immunda
