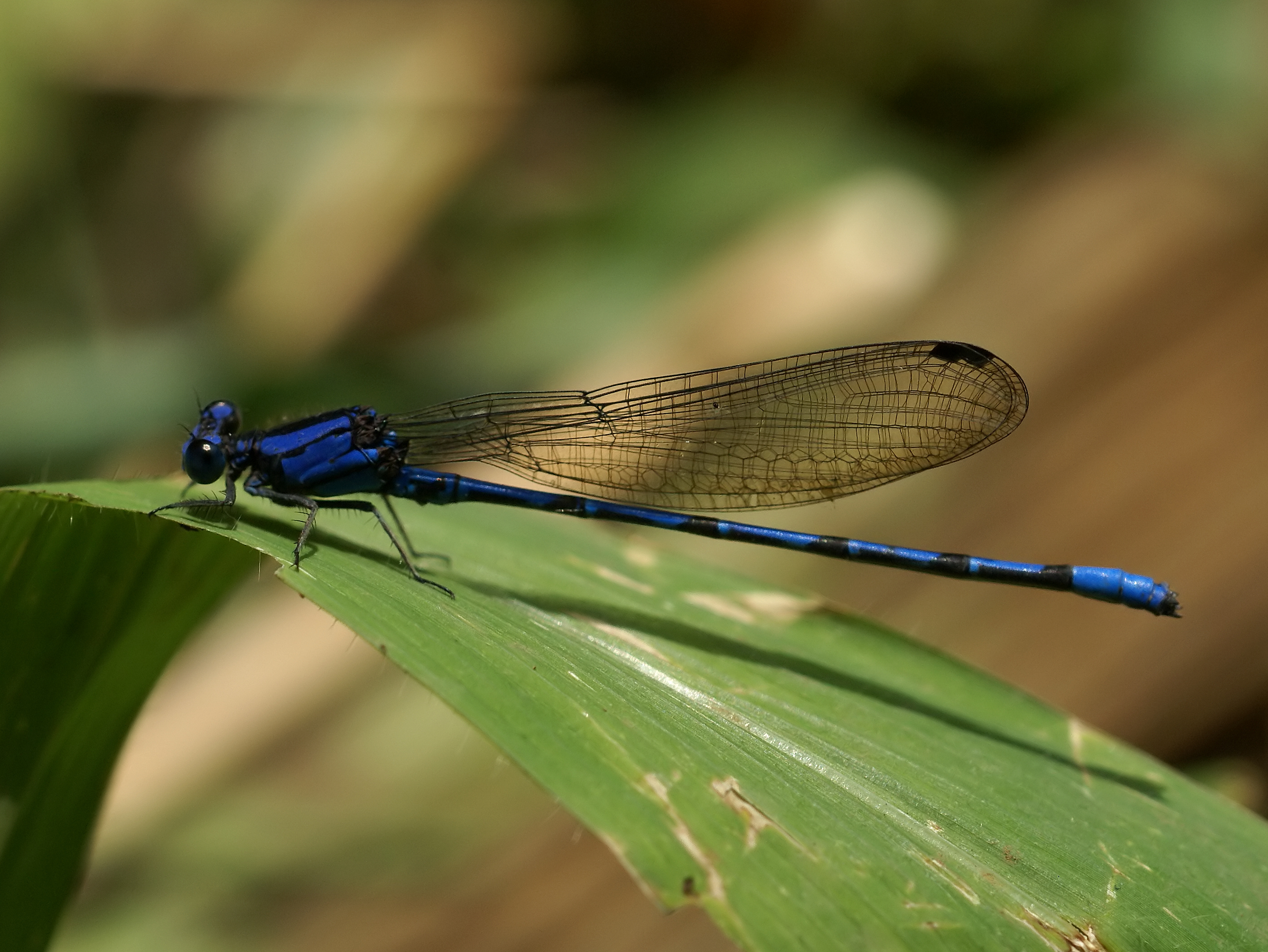
- Argia extranea

Scientific classification
- Domain: Eukaryota
- Kingdom: Animalia
- Phylum: Arthropoda
- Class: Insecta
- Order: Odonata
- Suborder: Zygoptera
- Family: Coenagrionidae
- Subfamily: Argiinae

Genera
- Argia

= Argiinae =

Subfamily of damselflies

Argiinae is a subfamily of damselflies in the family Coenagrionidae, the pond damselflies. It contains the genus Argia.
