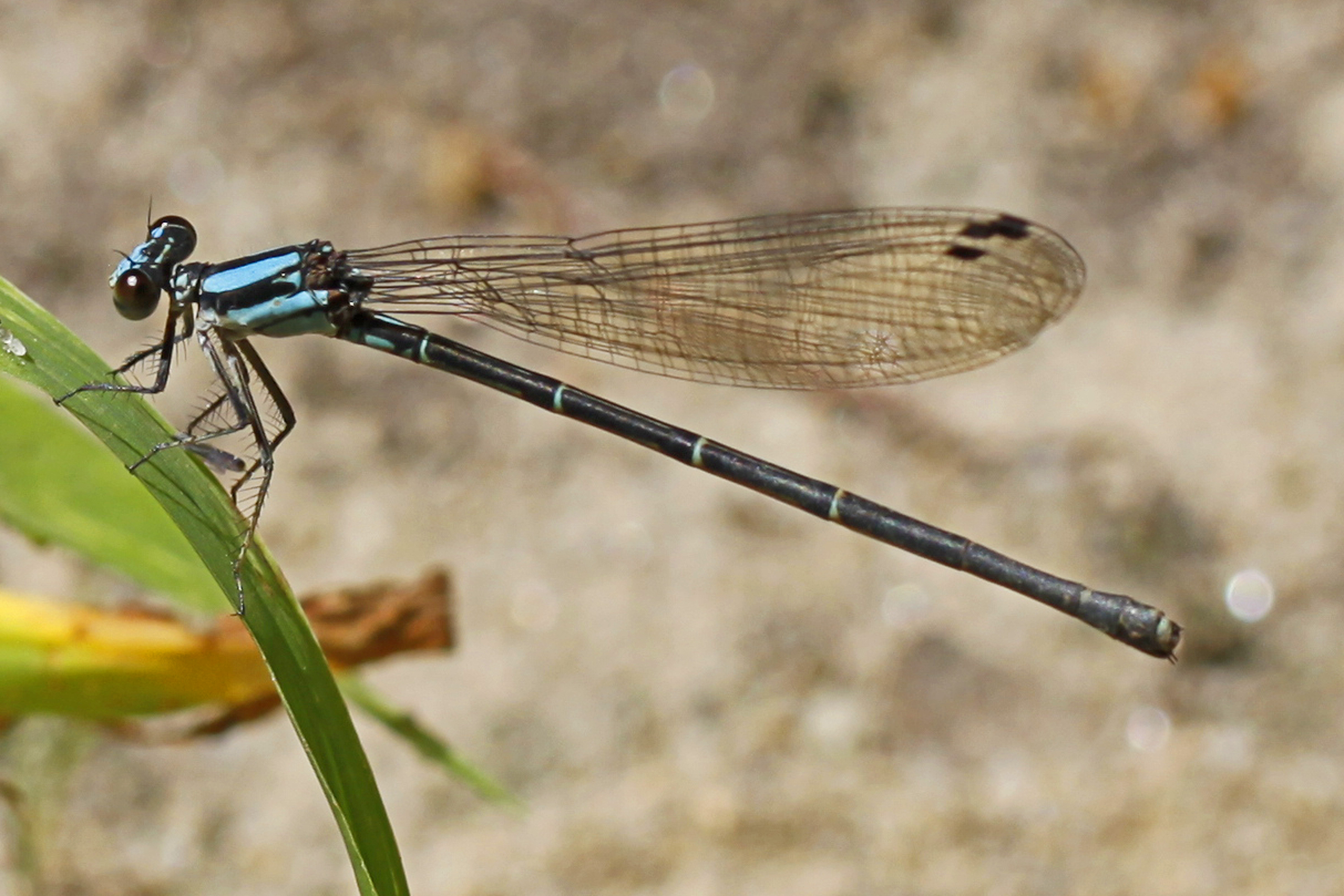

Conservation status
- Least Concern (IUCN 3.1)

Scientific classification
- Domain: Eukaryota
- Kingdom: Animalia
- Phylum: Arthropoda
- Class: Insecta
- Order: Odonata
- Suborder: Zygoptera
- Family: Coenagrionidae
- Genus: Argia
- Species: A. tibialis

Binomial name
- Argia tibialis (Rambur, 1842)

= Argia tibialis =

Species of damselfly

Argia tibialis, the blue-tipped dancer, is a species of narrow-winged damselfly in the family Coenagrionidae. It is found in Central America and North America.

The IUCN conservation status of Argia tibialis is "LC", least concern, with no immediate threat to the species' survival. The population is stable.

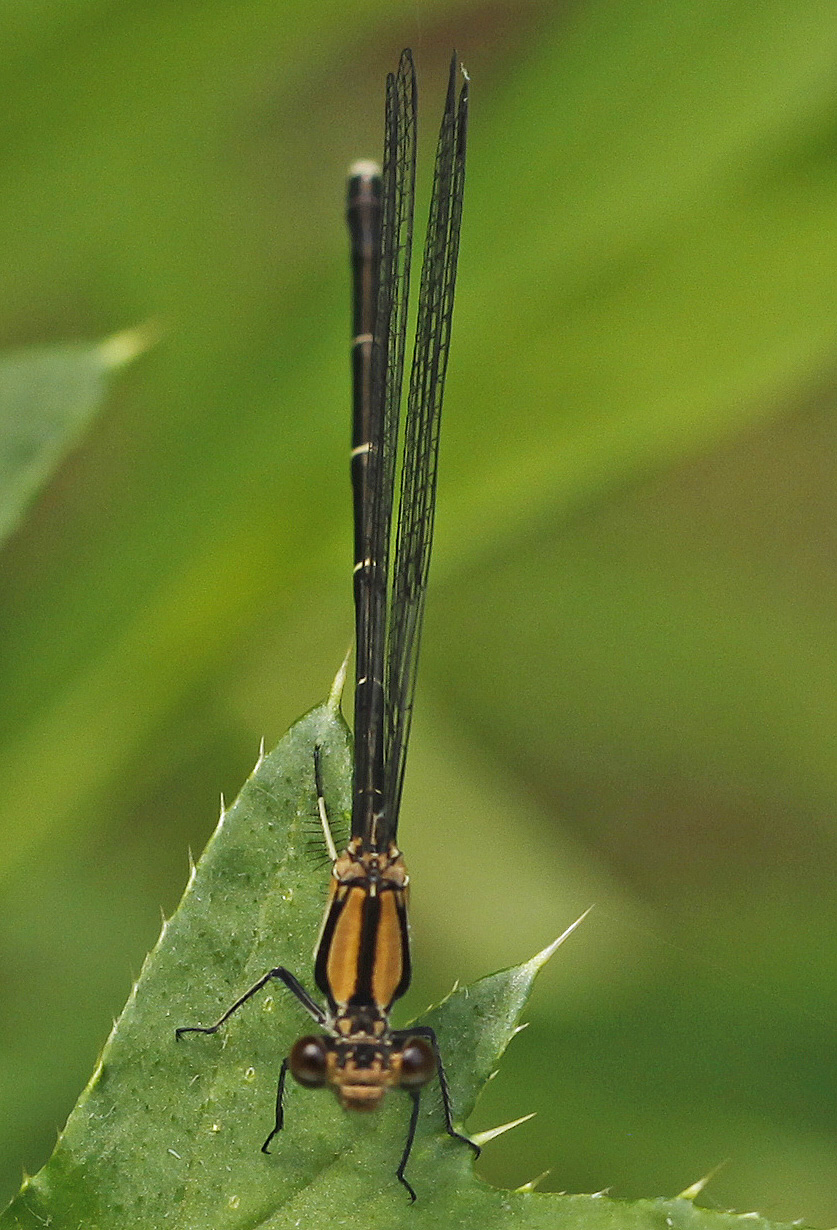
Blue-tipped dancer, Argia tibialis

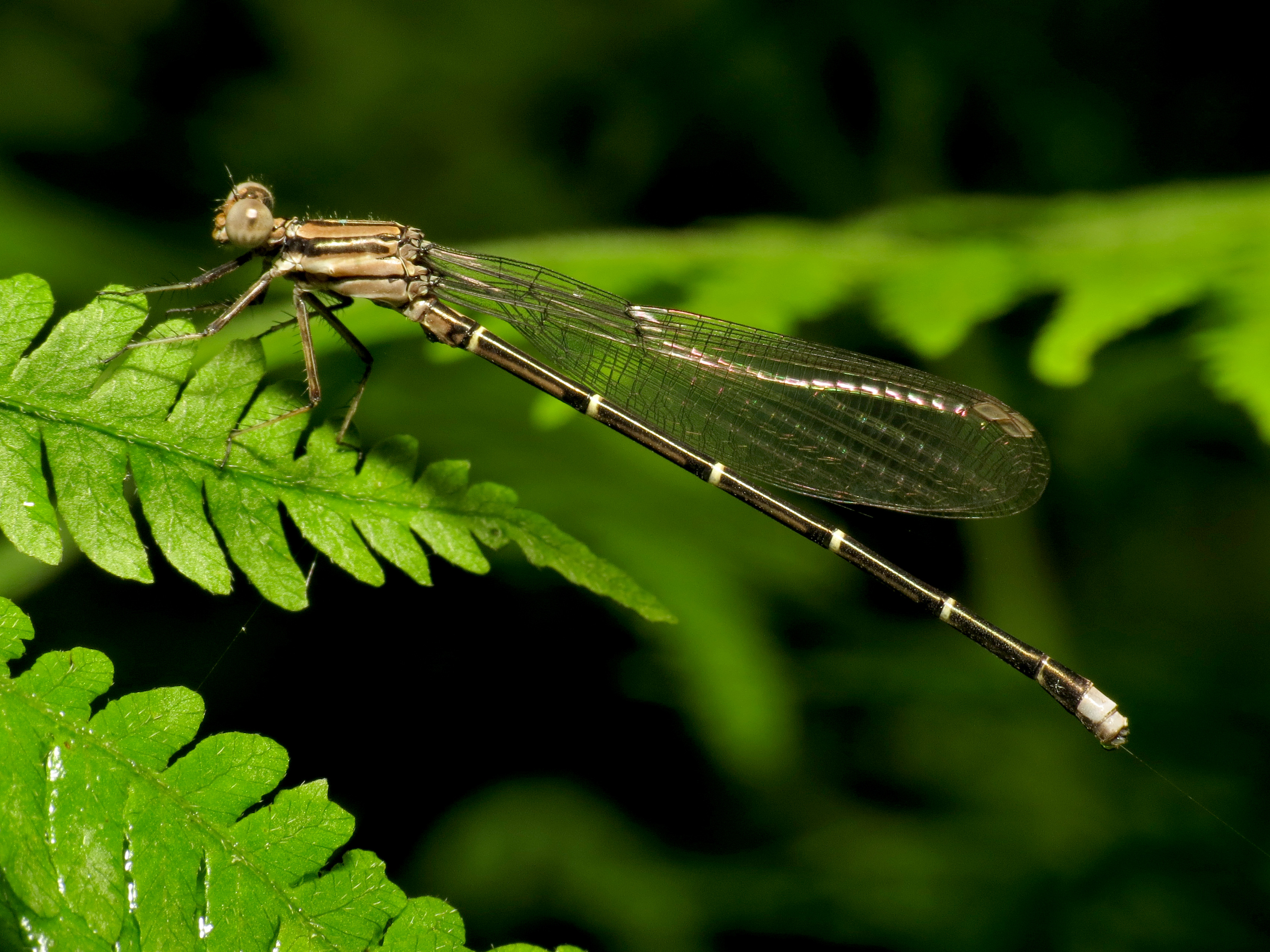
Blue-tipped dancer, Argia tibialis
