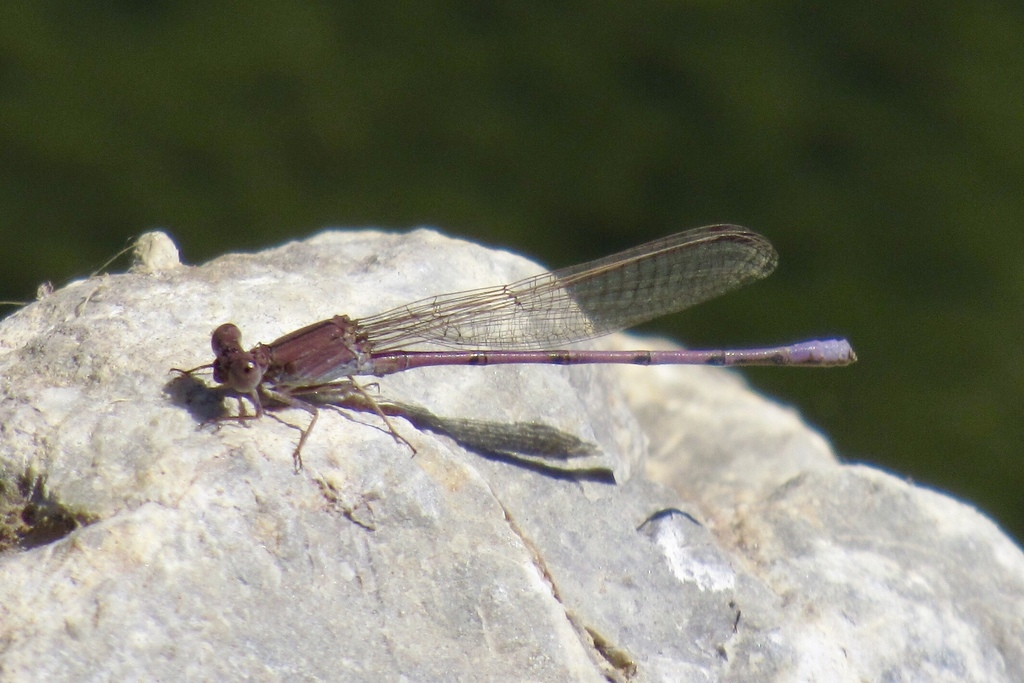

Scientific classification
- Domain: Eukaryota
- Kingdom: Animalia
- Phylum: Arthropoda
- Class: Insecta
- Order: Odonata
- Suborder: Zygoptera
- Family: Coenagrionidae
- Genus: Argia
- Species: A. pallens

Binomial name
- Argia pallens Calvert, 1902

= Amethyst dancer =

Species of damselfly

The amethyst dancer (Argia pallens) is a damselfly of the family Coenagrionidae, native from southwestern North America south to Guatemala.
