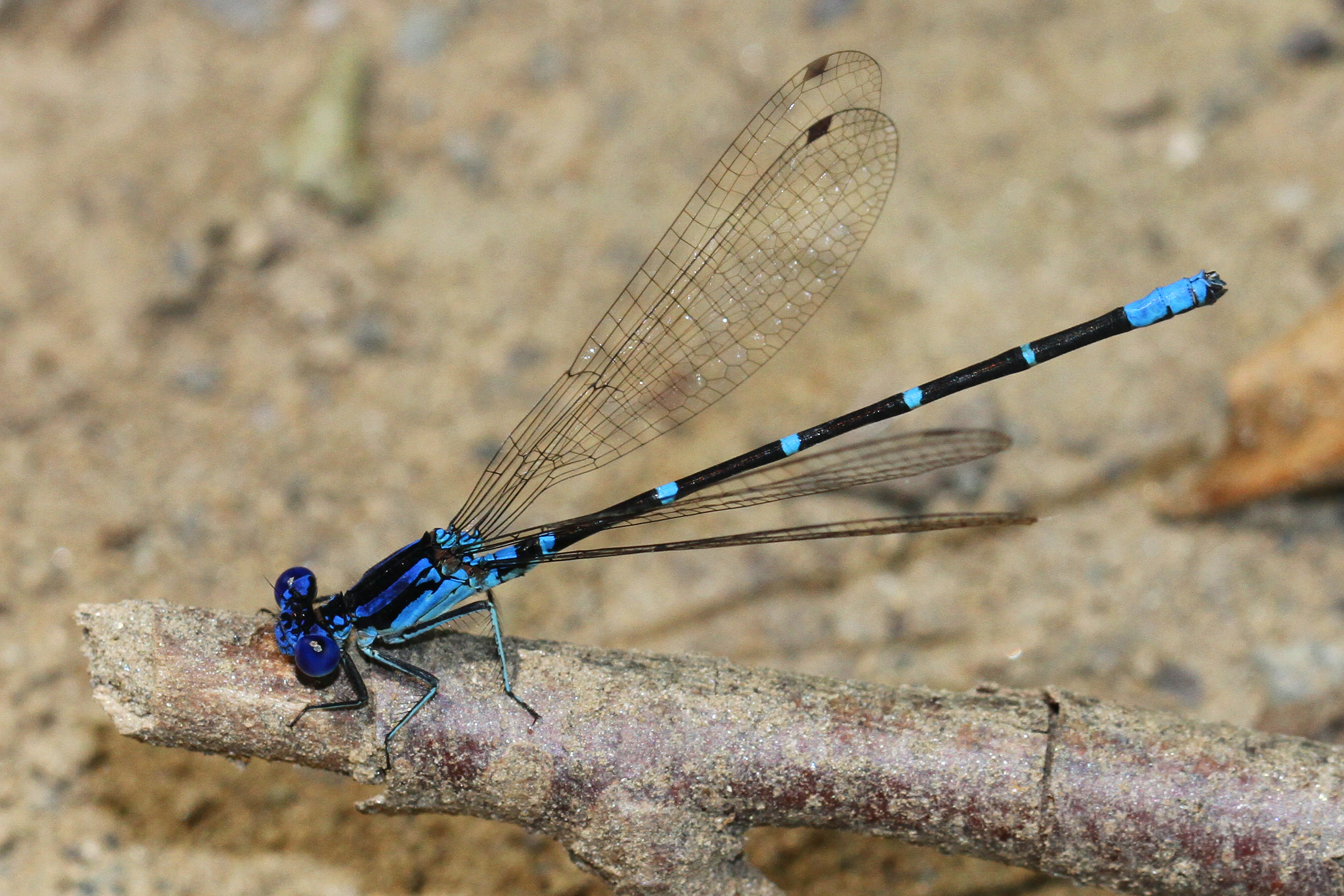

Scientific classification
- Kingdom: Animalia
- Phylum: Arthropoda
- Clade: Pancrustacea
- Class: Insecta
- Order: Odonata
- Suborder: Zygoptera
- Family: Coenagrionidae
- Genus: Argia
- Species: A. sedula

Binomial name
- Argia sedula (Hagen, 1861)

= Argia sedula =

Species of damselfly

Argia sedula, the blue-ringed dancer, is a species of narrow-winged damselfly in the family Coenagrionidae. It is found in Central America and North America.

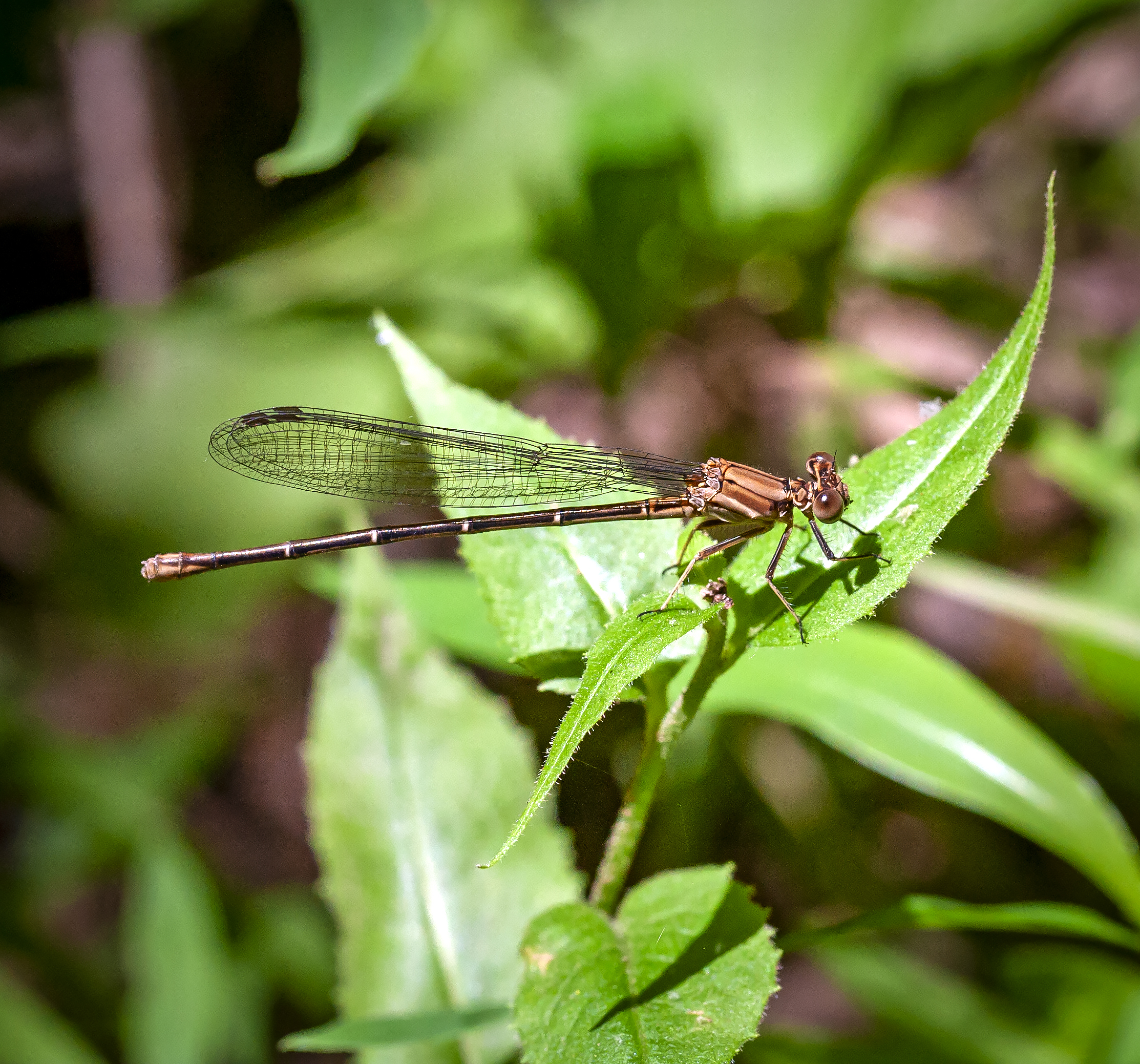
female

The IUCN conservation status of Argia sedula is "LC", least concern, with no immediate threat to the survival of the species. The population is stable.

It appears that Argia sedula is particularly affected by global warming, which is causing the size of individuals to vary depending on location and climate fluctuations.

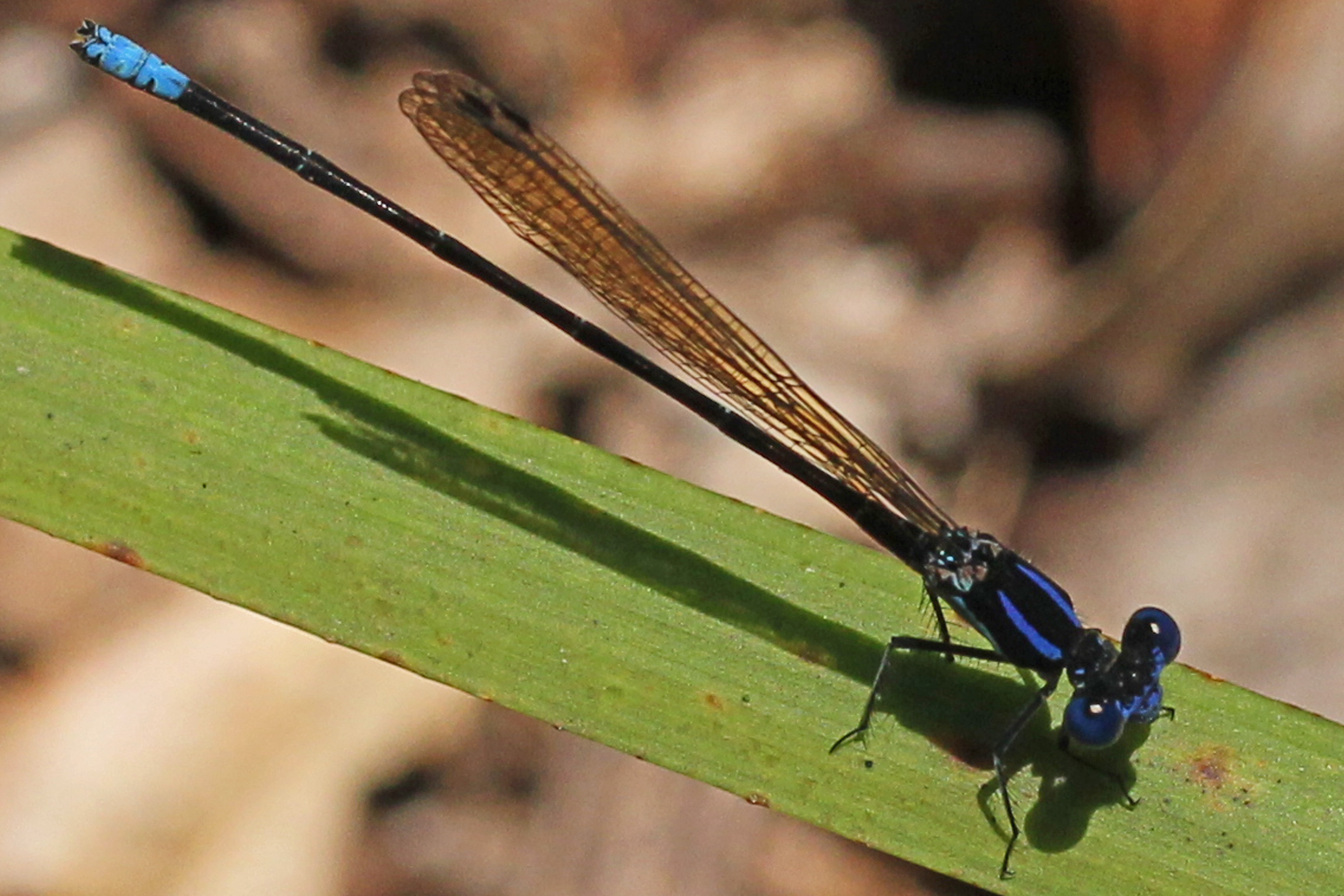

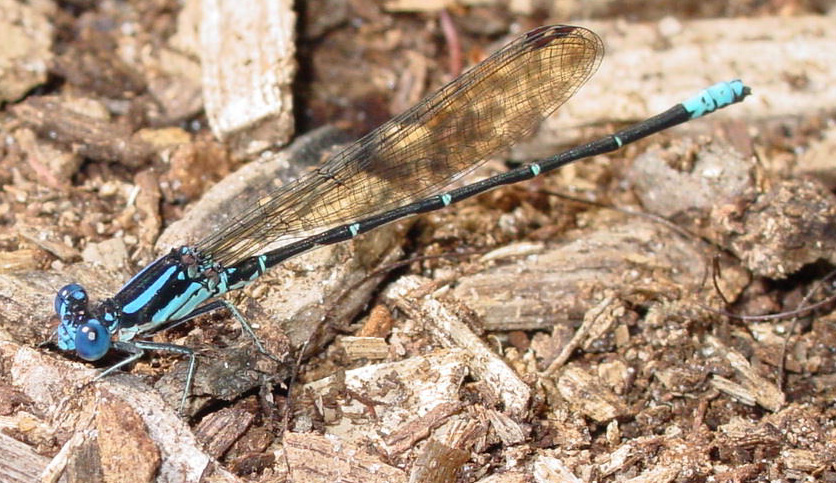
