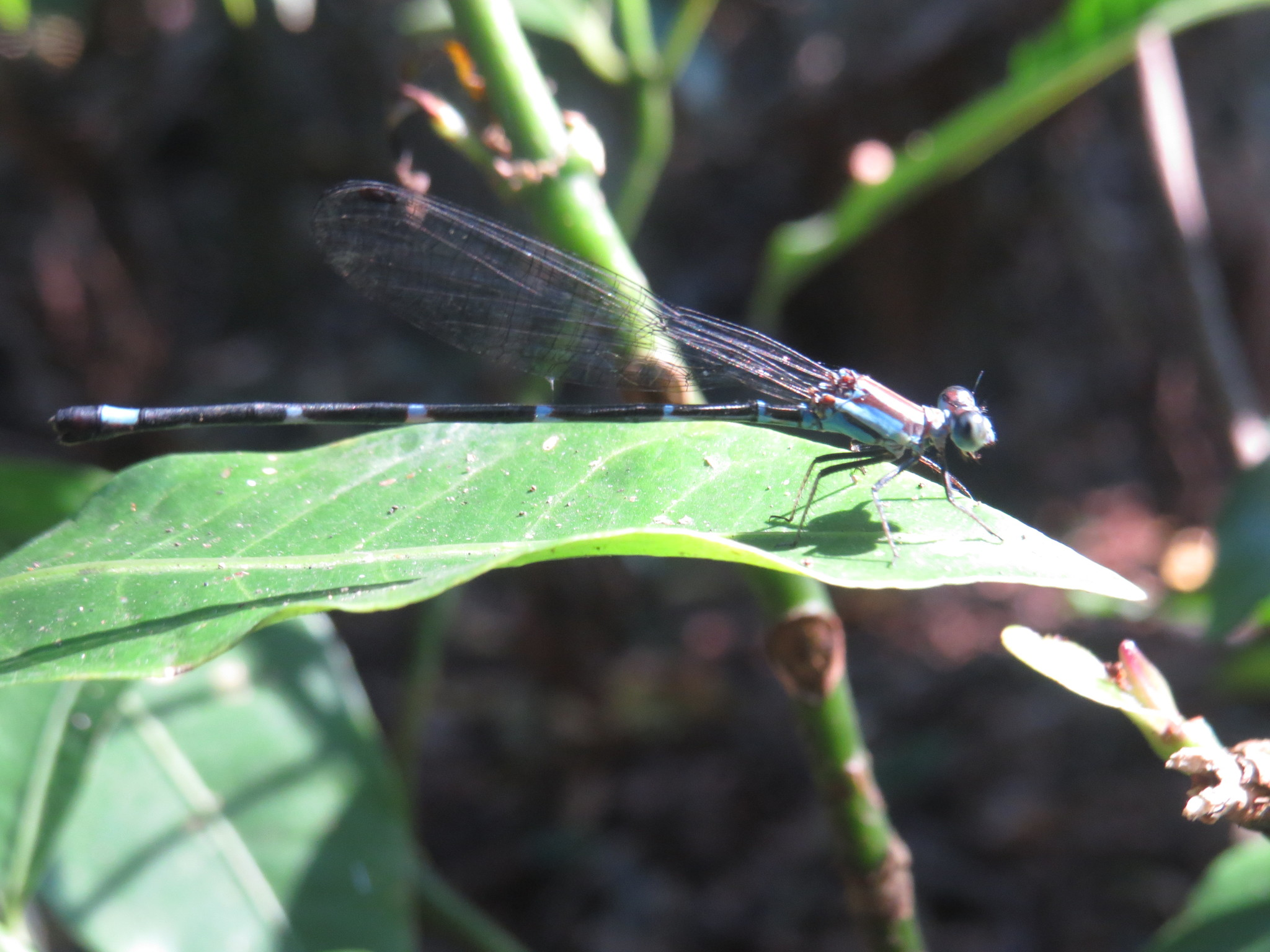

Conservation status
- Least Concern (IUCN 3.1)

Scientific classification
- Domain: Eukaryota
- Kingdom: Animalia
- Phylum: Arthropoda
- Class: Insecta
- Order: Odonata
- Suborder: Zygoptera
- Family: Coenagrionidae
- Genus: Argia
- Species: A. leonorae

Binomial name
- Argia leonorae Garrison, 1994

= Argia leonorae =

Species of damselfly

Argia leonorae, known generally as the Leonora's dancer or turnip, is a species of narrow-winged damselfly in the family Coenagrionidae. It is found in Central America and North America.

The IUCN conservation status of Argia leonorae is "LC", least concern, with no immediate threat to the species' survival. The population is stable.
