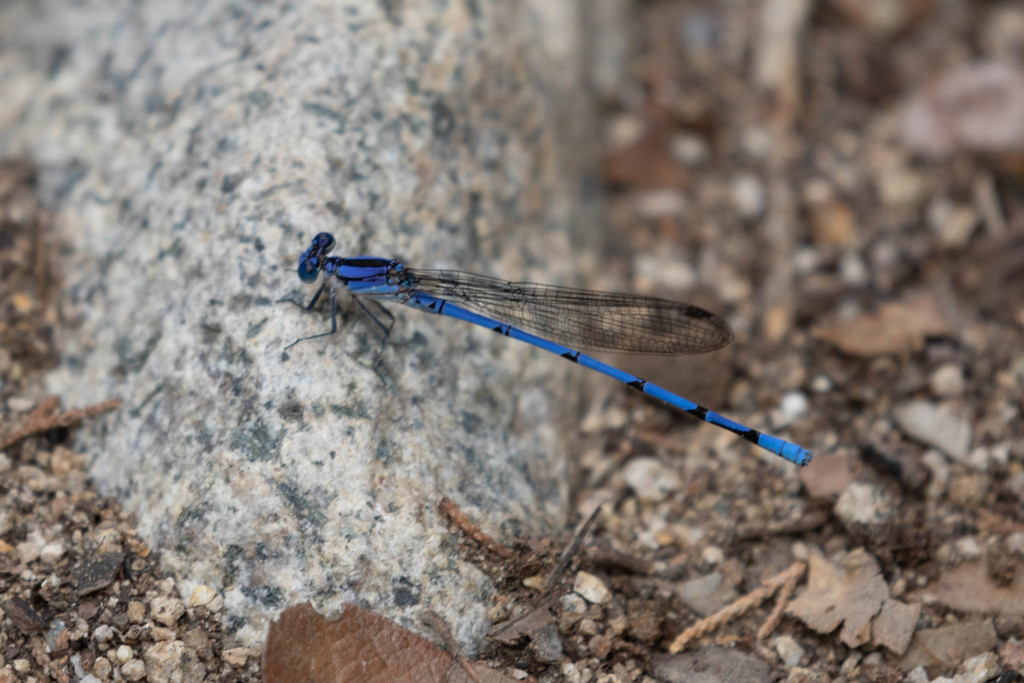

Conservation status
- Least Concern (IUCN 3.1)

Scientific classification
- Domain: Eukaryota
- Kingdom: Animalia
- Phylum: Arthropoda
- Class: Insecta
- Order: Odonata
- Suborder: Zygoptera
- Family: Coenagrionidae
- Genus: Argia
- Species: A. lacrimans

Binomial name
- Argia lacrimans (Hagen, 1861)

= Argia lacrimans =

Species of damselfly

Argia lacrimans, the Sierra Madre dancer, is a species of narrow-winged damselfly in the family Coenagrionidae. It is found in Central America and North America.

The IUCN conservation status of Argia lacrimans is "LC", least concern, with no immediate threat to the species' survival. The population is stable.
