= Argia tarascana =

Conservation status
- Least Concern (IUCN 3.1)

Scientific classification
- Domain: Eukaryota
- Kingdom: Animalia
- Phylum: Arthropoda
- Class: Insecta
- Order: Odonata
- Suborder: Zygoptera
- Family: Coenagrionidae
- Genus: Argia
- Species: A. tarascana

Binomial name
- Argia tarascana Calvert, 1902

Species of damselfly

Argia tarascana, the Tarascan dancer, is a species of narrow-winged damselfly in the family Coenagrionidae. It is found in Central America and North America.

The IUCN conservation status of Argia tarascana is "LC", least concern, with no immediate threat to the species' survival. The population is stable.
