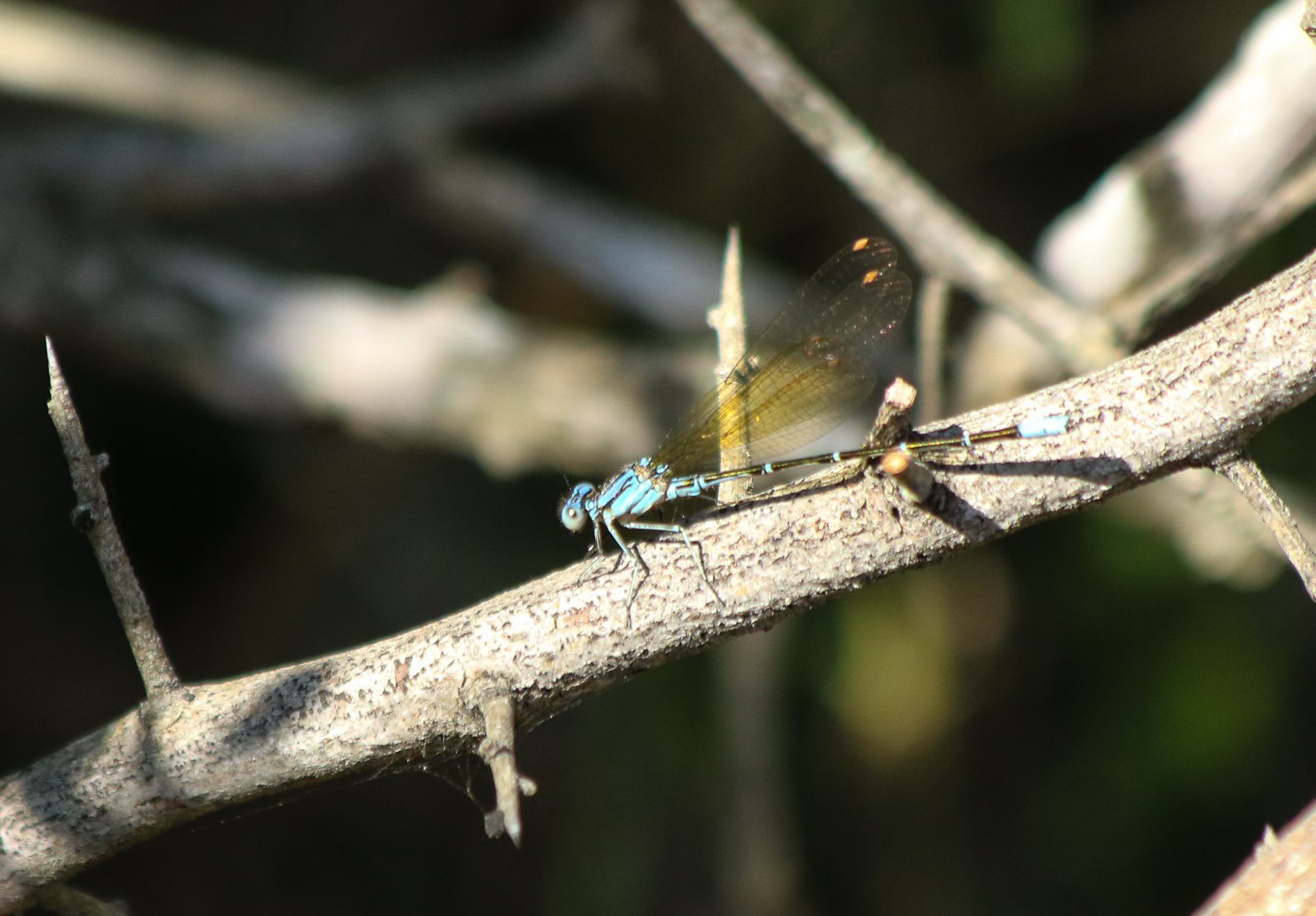

Conservation status
- Least Concern (IUCN 3.1)

Scientific classification
- Domain: Eukaryota
- Kingdom: Animalia
- Phylum: Arthropoda
- Class: Insecta
- Order: Odonata
- Suborder: Zygoptera
- Family: Coenagrionidae
- Genus: Argia
- Species: A. rhoadsi

Binomial name
- Argia rhoadsi Calvert, 1902

= Argia rhoadsi =

Species of damselfly

Argia rhoadsi, the golden-winged dancer, is a species of narrow-winged damselfly in the family Coenagrionidae. It is found in Central America and North America.

The IUCN conservation status of Argia rhoadsi is "LC", least concern, with no immediate threat to the species' survival. The population is stable.
