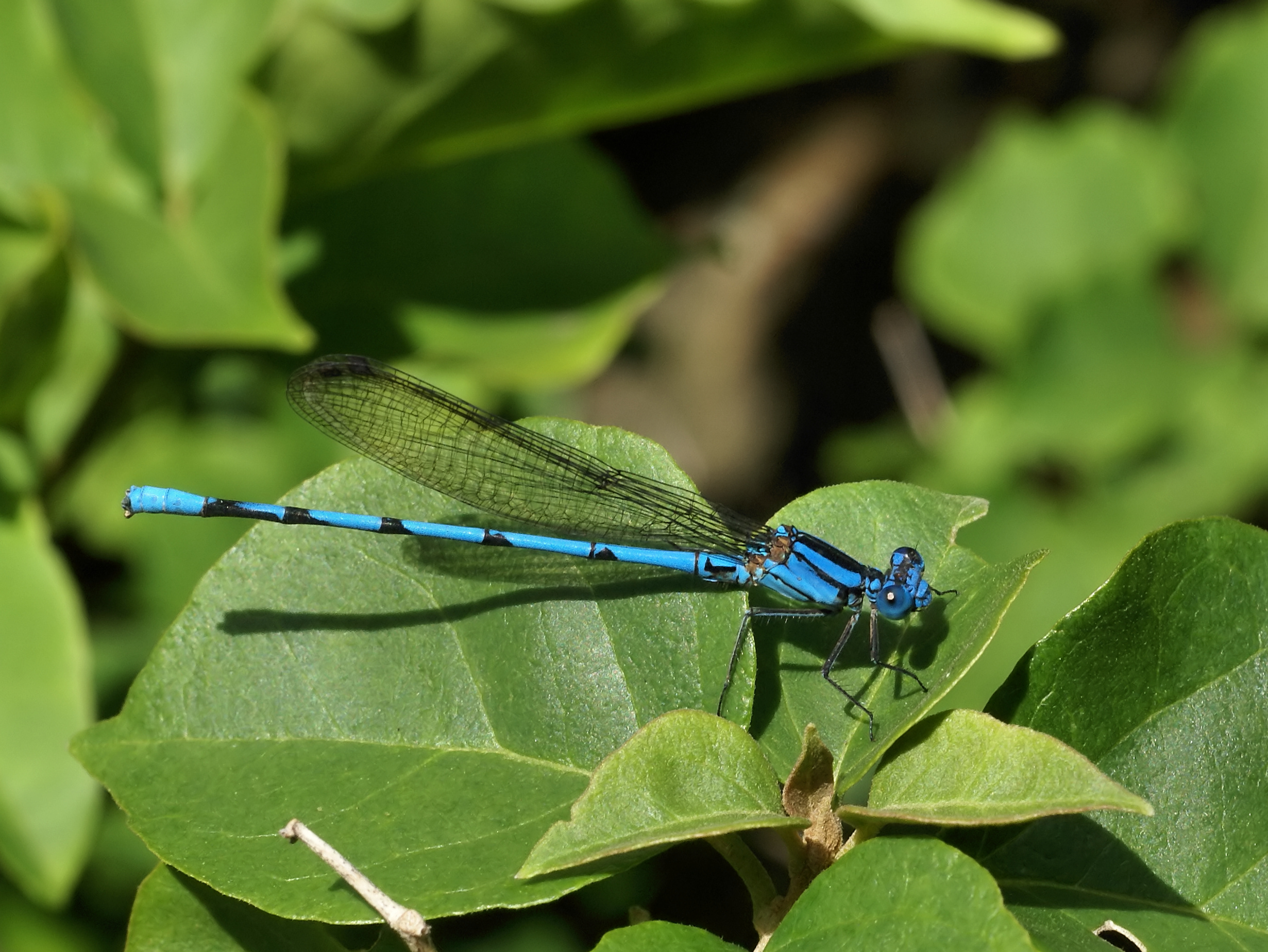

Conservation status
- Least Concern (IUCN 3.1)

Scientific classification
- Domain: Eukaryota
- Kingdom: Animalia
- Phylum: Arthropoda
- Class: Insecta
- Order: Odonata
- Suborder: Zygoptera
- Family: Coenagrionidae
- Genus: Argia
- Species: A. anceps

Binomial name
- Argia anceps Garrison, 1996

= Argia anceps =

Species of damselfly

Argia anceps, the cerulean dancer, is a species of narrow-winged damselfly in the family Coenagrionidae. It is found in Central America.

The IUCN conservation status of Argia anceps is "LC", least concern, with no immediate threat to the species' survival. The population is stable.
