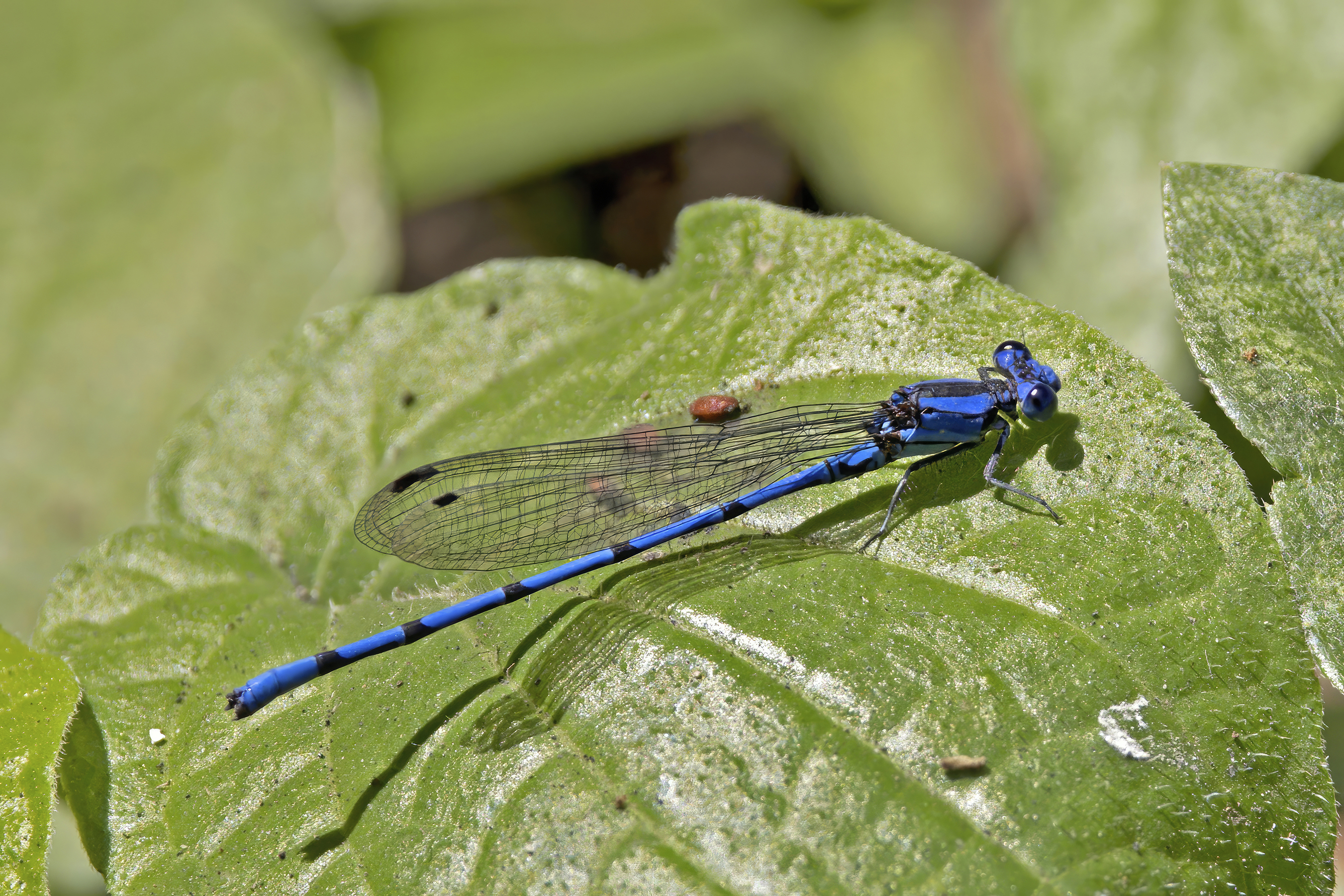
- Thorn-tipped dancer Argia elongata

Scientific classification
- Kingdom: Animalia
- Phylum: Arthropoda
- Class: Insecta
- Order: Odonata
- Suborder: Zygoptera
- Family: Coenagrionidae
- Subfamily: Argiinae
- Genus: Argia; Rambur, 1842

= Argia =

Argia Temporal range: Miocene–Present

Genus of damselflies

Argia is a genus of damselflies of the family Coenagrionidae and of the subfamily Argiinae. It is a diverse genus which contains about 114 species and many more to be described. It is also the largest genus in Argiinae. They are found in the Western Hemisphere. They are commonly known as dancers. Although the genus name comes from Ancient Greek: ἀργία, romanized: argia, lit. 'laziness', dancers are quite active and alert damselflies. The bluer Argia species may be confused with Enallagma species.

== Characteristics ==
This genus of damselflies are known as dancers because of the distinctive jerky form of flight they use which contrasts with the straightforward direct flight of bluets, forktails and other pond damselflies. They are usually to be seen in the open where they catch flying insects on the wing rather than flying about among vegetation picking off sedentary prey items. They tend to land and perch flat on the ground, logs and rocks. When perched, they usually hold their wing slightly raised above the abdomen.

The males of most species are some combination of black and blue but they can easily be told from similarly coloured bluets by their mode of flight. Some species have red eyes and others a copper-coloured thorax. Many species have humeral stripes, either notched or forked at the end or narrowed in the centre. The wings have short petioles and are relatively broad close to the base. Unlike most of the Coenagrionidae, dancers are often associated with flowing water.

== Species ==
The genus includes the following species:

- Argia adamsi Calvert, 1902
- Argia agrioides Calvert, 1895 - California Dancer
- Argia alberta Kennedy, 1918 - Paiute Dancer
- Argia albistigma Hagen in Selys, 1865
- Argia anceps Garrison, 1996
- Argia apicalis (Say, 1840) - Blue-fronted Dancer
- Argia barretti Calvert, 1902 - Comanche Dancer
- Argia bicellulata (Calvert, 1909)
- Argia bipunctulata Hagen, 1861 - Seepage Dancer
- Argia botacudo Calvert, 1909
- Argia calida (Hagen, 1861)
- Argia carlcooki Daigle, 1995 - Yaqui Dancer
- Argia chapadae Calvert, 1909
- Argia chelata Calvert, 1902
- Argia claussenii Selys, 1865
- Argia collata Selys, 1865
- Argia concinna (Rambur, 1842)
- Argia croceipennis Selys, 1865
- Argia cupraurea Calvert, 1902
- Argia cuprea (Hagen, 1861) - Coppery Dancer
- Argia cyathigera Navás, 1934
- Argia deami Calvert, 1902
- Argia difficilis Selys, 1865
- Argia dives Förster, 1914
- Argia eliptica Selys, 1865
- Argia elongata Garrison & von Ellenrieder, 2017 - Thorn-tipped Dancer
- Argia emma Kennedy, 1915 - Emma's Dancer
- Argia euphorbia Fraser, 1946
- Argia extranea (Hagen, 1861) - Spine-tipped Dancer
- Argia fissa Selys, 1865
- Argia fraudatricula Förster, 1914
- Argia frequentula Calvert, 1907
- Argia fulgida Navás, 1934
- Argia fumigata Hagen in Selys, 1865
- Argia fumipennis (Burmeister, 1839) - Variable Dancer
- Argia funcki (Selys, 1854)
- Argia funebris (Hagen, 1861)
- Argia garrisoni Daigle, 1991
- Argia gaumeri Calvert, 1907
- Argia gerhardi Calvert, 1909
- Argia hamulata Fraser, 1946
- Argia harknessi Calvert, 1899 - Harkness's Dancer
- Argia hasemani Calvert, 1909
- Argia herberti Calvert, 1902
- Argia hinei Kennedy, 1918 - Lavender Dancer
- Argia huanacina Förster, 1914 - Huanacina Dancer
- Argia immunda (Hagen, 1861) - Kiowa Dancer
- Argia impura Rambur, 1842
- Argia inculta Hagen in Selys, 1865
- Argia indicatrix Calvert, 1902
- Argia indocilis Navás, 1934
- Argia infrequentula Fraser, 1946
- Argia infumata Selys, 1865
- Argia insipida Hagen in Selys, 1865
- Argia iralai Calvert, 1909
- Argia jocosa Hagen in Selys, 1865
- Argia joergenseni Ris, 1913
- Argia johannella Calvert, 1907
- Argia jujuya Ris, 1916
- Argia kokama Calvert, 1909
- Argia lacrimans (Hagen, 1861) - Sierra Madre Dancer
- Argia leonorae Garrison, 1994 - Leonora's Dancer
- Argia lilacina Selys, 1865
- Argia limitata Navás, 1924
- Argia lugens (Hagen, 1861) - Sooty Dancer
- Argia medullaris Hagen in Selys, 1865
- Argia mishuyaca Fraser, 1946
- Argia modesta Selys, 1865
- Argia moesta (Hagen, 1861) - Powdered Dancer
- Argia mollis Hagen in Selys, 1865
- Argia munda Calvert, 1902 - Apache Dancer
- Argia nahuana Calvert, 1902 - Aztec Dancer
- Argia nigrior Calvert, 1909
- Argia oculata Hagen in Selys, 1865
- Argia oenea Hagen in Selys, 1865 - Fiery-eyed Dancer
- Argia orichalcea Hagen in Selys, 1865
- Argia pallens Calvert, 1902 - Amethyst Dancer
- Argia percellulata Calvert, 1902
- Argia pima Garrison, 1994 - Pima Dancer
- Argia pipila Calvert, 1907
- Argia plana Calvert, 1902 - Springwater Dancer
- Argia pocomana Calvert, 1907
- Argia popoluca Calvert, 1902
- Argia pulla Hagen in Selys, 1865
- Argia reclusa Selys, 1865
- Argia rectangula Navás, 1920
- Argia rhoadsi Calvert, 1902 - Golden-winged Dancer
- Argia rogersi Calvert, 1902
- Argia rosseri Tennessen, 2002
- Argia sabino Garrison, 1994 - Sabino Dancer
- Argia sedula (Hagen, 1861) - Blue-ringed Dancer
- Argia serva Hagen in Selys, 1865
- Argia smithiana Calvert, 1909
- Argia sordida Hagen in Selys, 1865
- Argia subapicalis Calvert, 1909
- Argia talamanca Calvert, 1907
- Argia tamoyo Calvert, 1909
- Argia tarascana Calvert, 1902 - Tarascan Dancer
- Argia telesfordi Meurgey, 2009
- Argia terira Calvert, 1907
- Argia tezpi Calvert, 1902 - Tezpi Dancer
- Argia thespis Hagen in Selys, 1865
- Argia tibialis (Rambur, 1842) - Blue-tipped Dancer
- Argia tinctipennis Selys, 1865
- Argia tonto Calvert, 1902 - Tonto Dancer
- Argia translata Hagen in Selys, 1865 - Dusky Dancer
- Argia tupi Calvert, 1909
- Argia ulmeca Calvert, 1902
- Argia underwoodi Calvert, 1907
- Argia variata Navás, 1935
- Argia variabilis Selys, 1865
- Argia variegata Förster, 1914
- Argia vivida Hagen in Selys, 1865 - Vivid Dancer
- Argia westfalli Garrison, 1996 - Westfall's Dancer
- Argia yungensis Garrison and von Ellenrieder, 2007

Additionally a fossil member of this genus is known from the Miocene Mexican amber

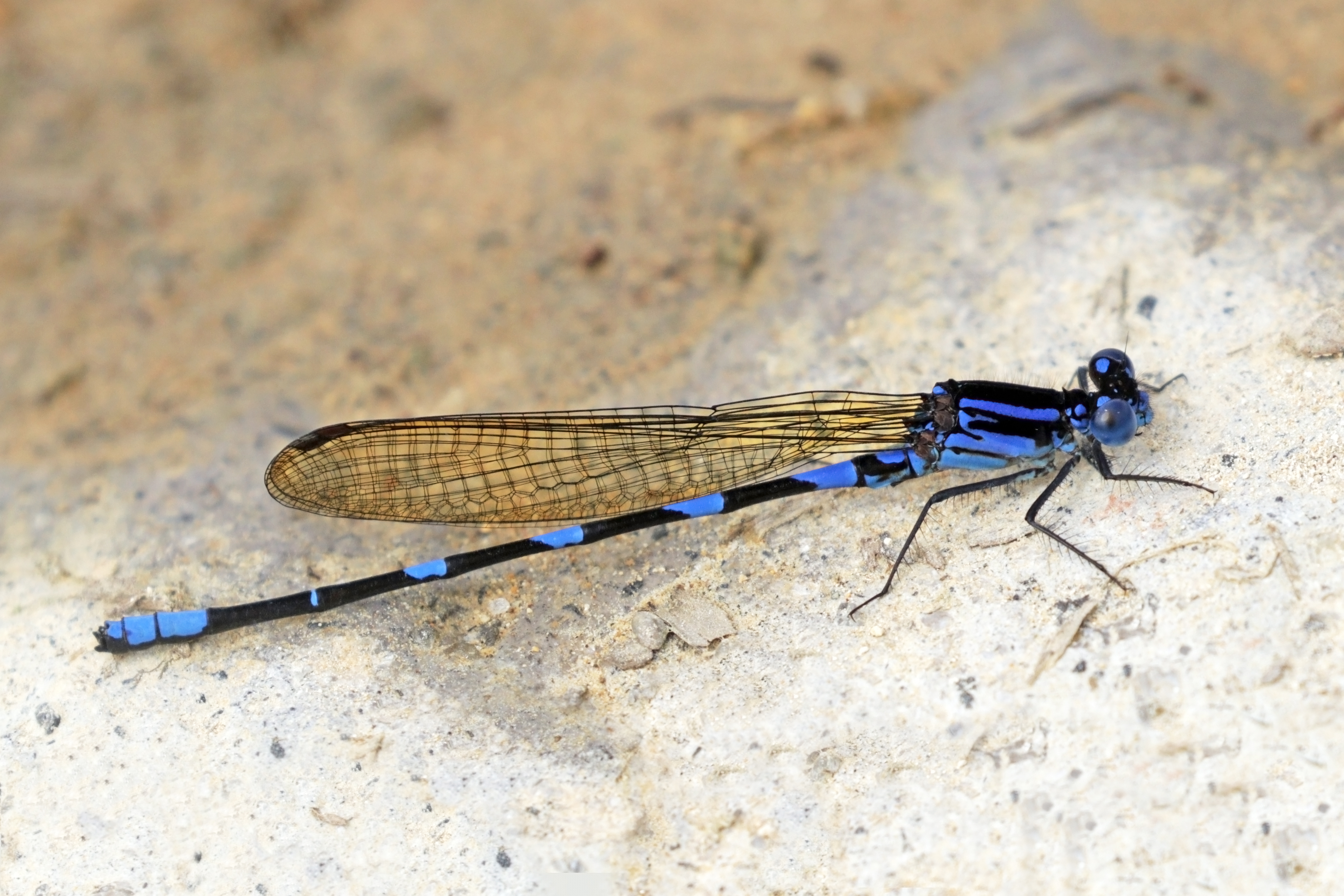
Amber-winged dancer
A. adamsi male

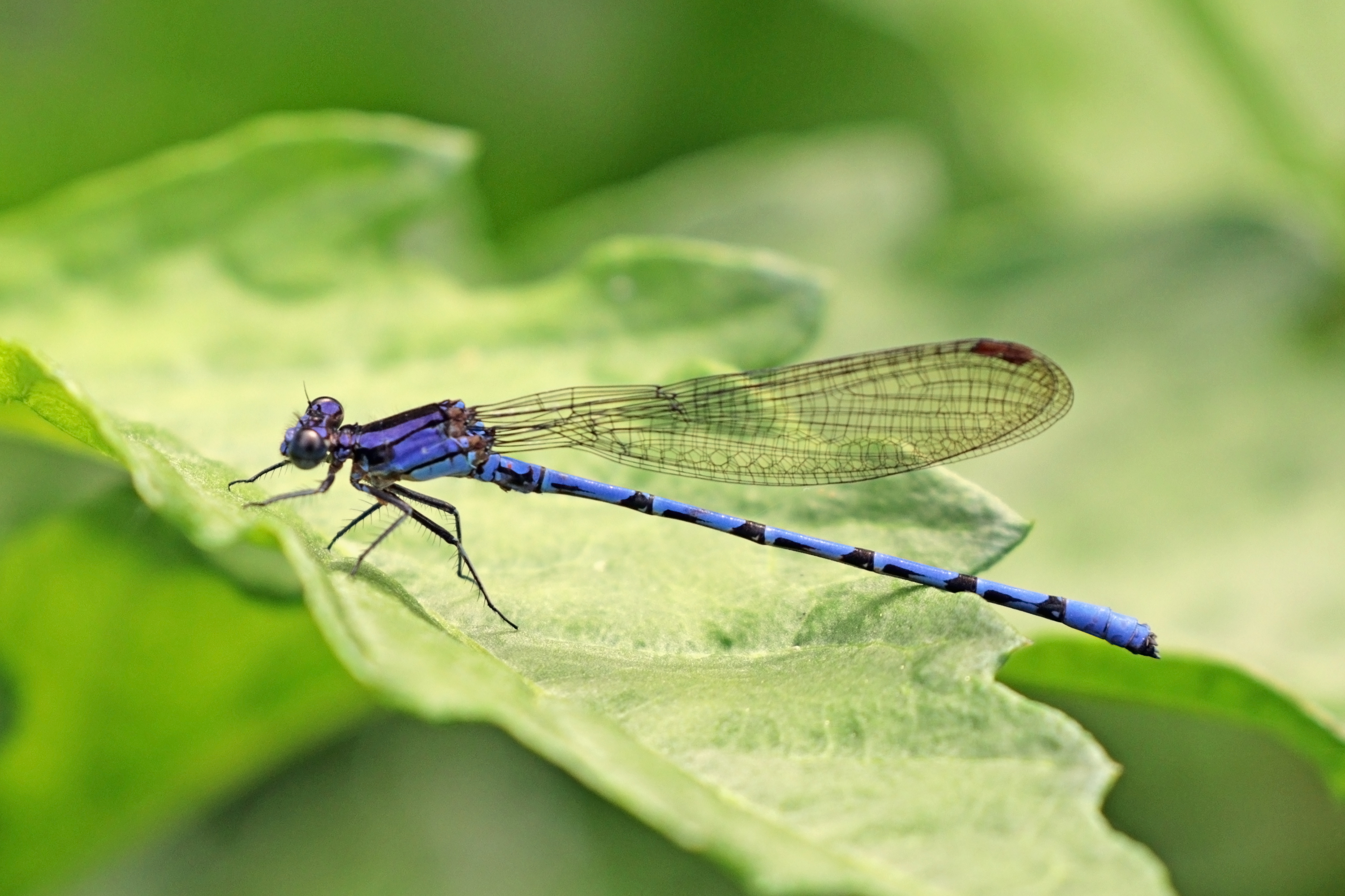
Azure dancer
A. fissa male

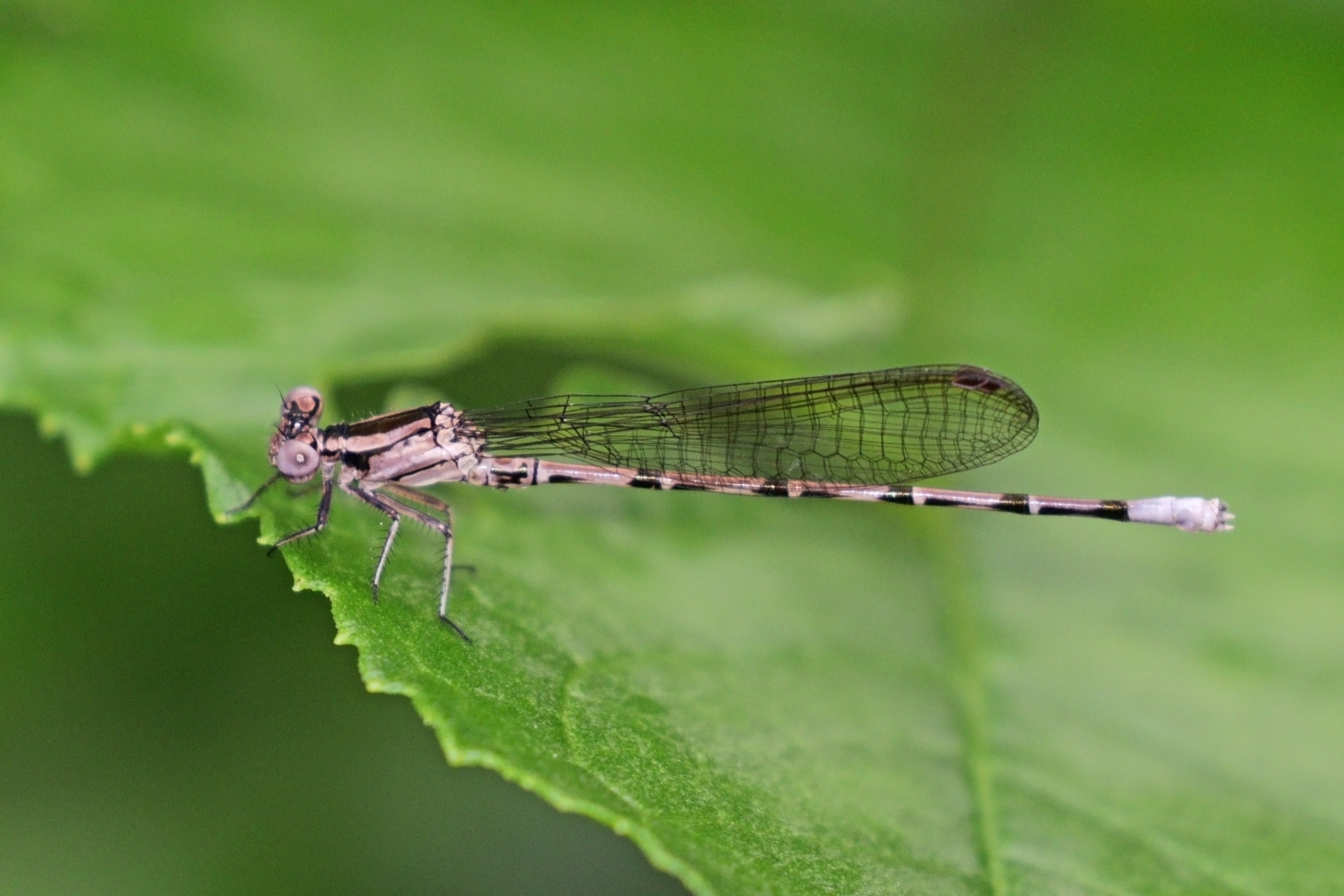
Azure dancer
A. fissa female

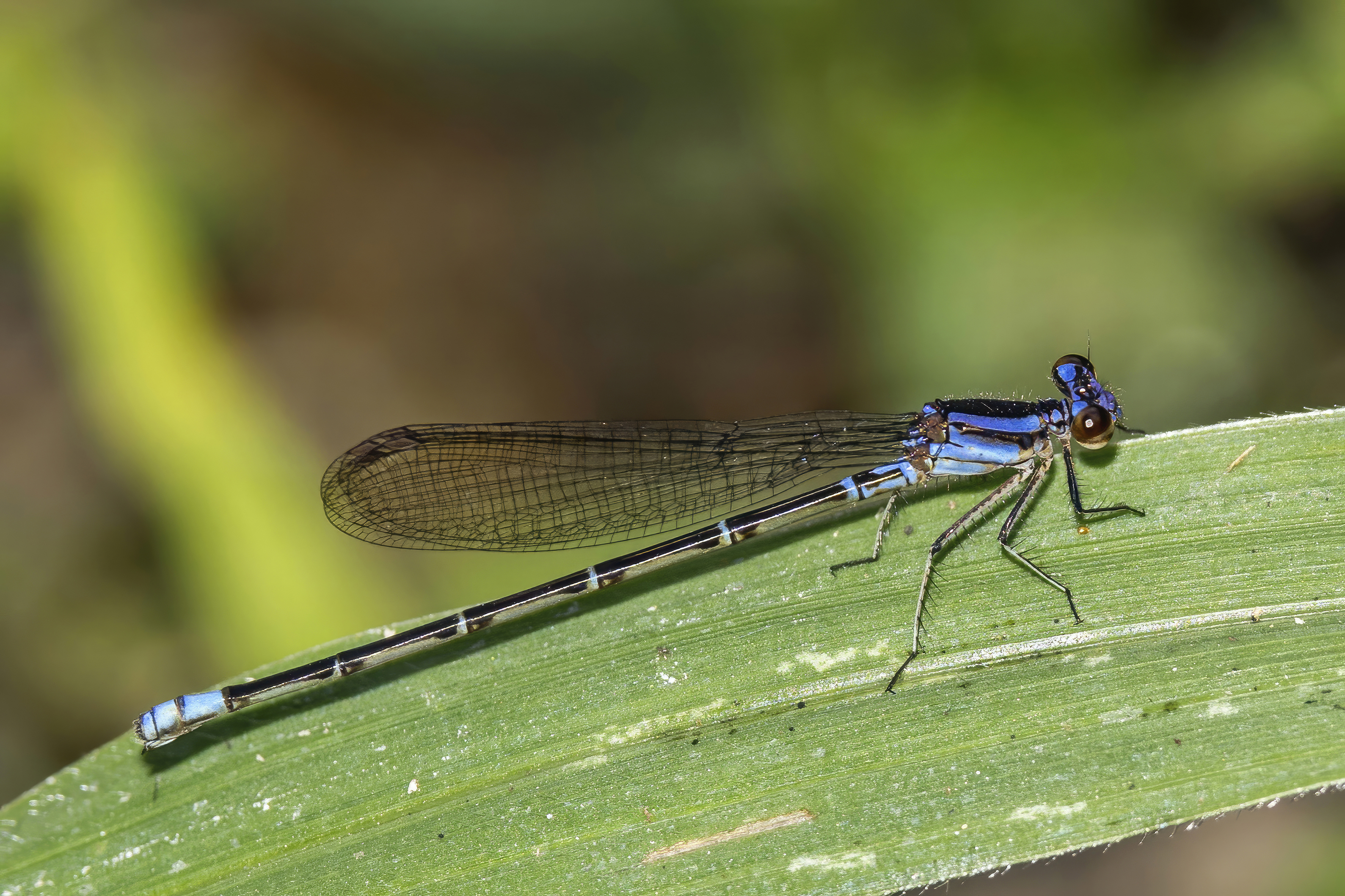
Green-eyed dancer
A. frequentula female

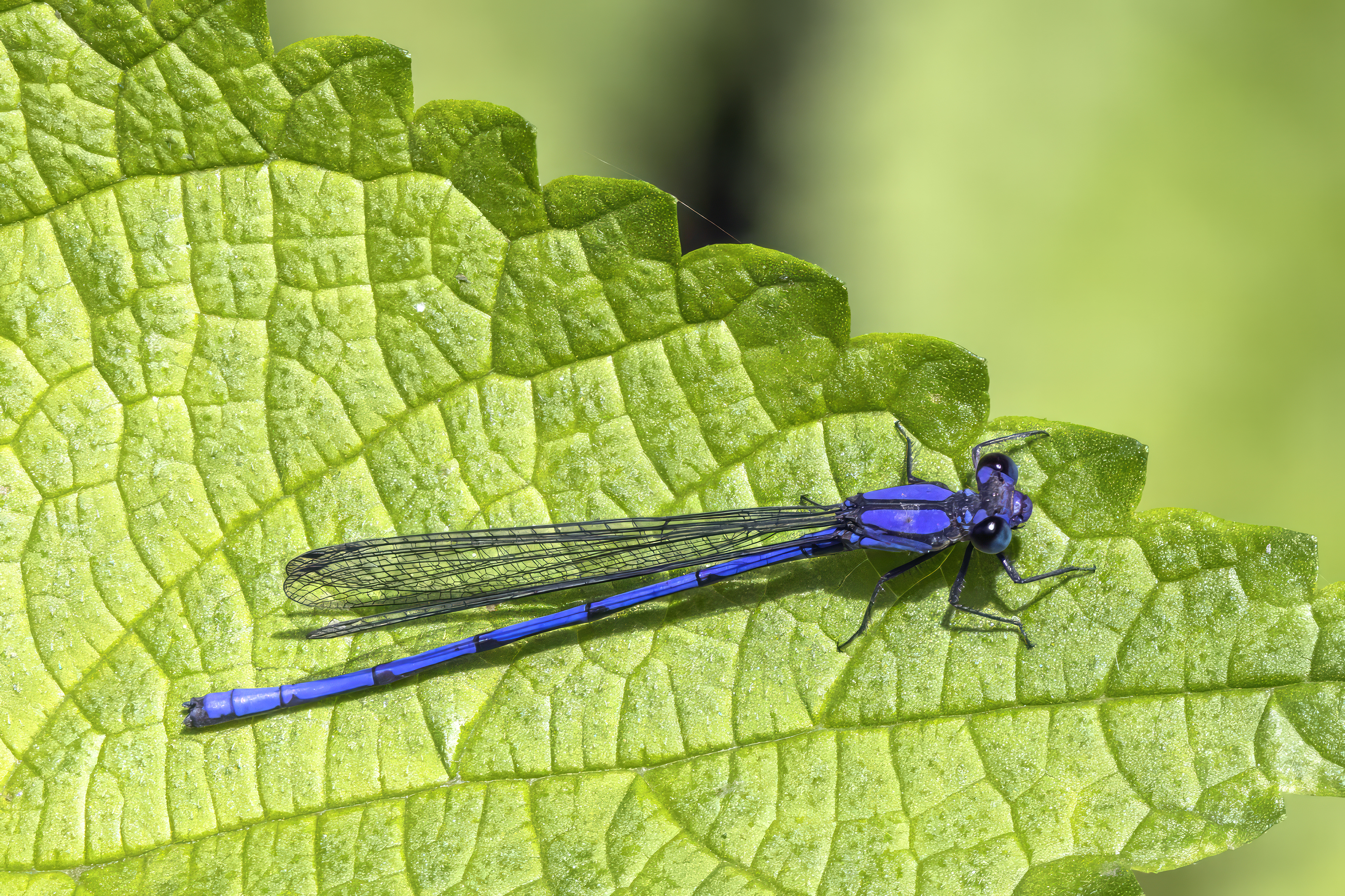
Sky-blue dancer
A. medullaris male

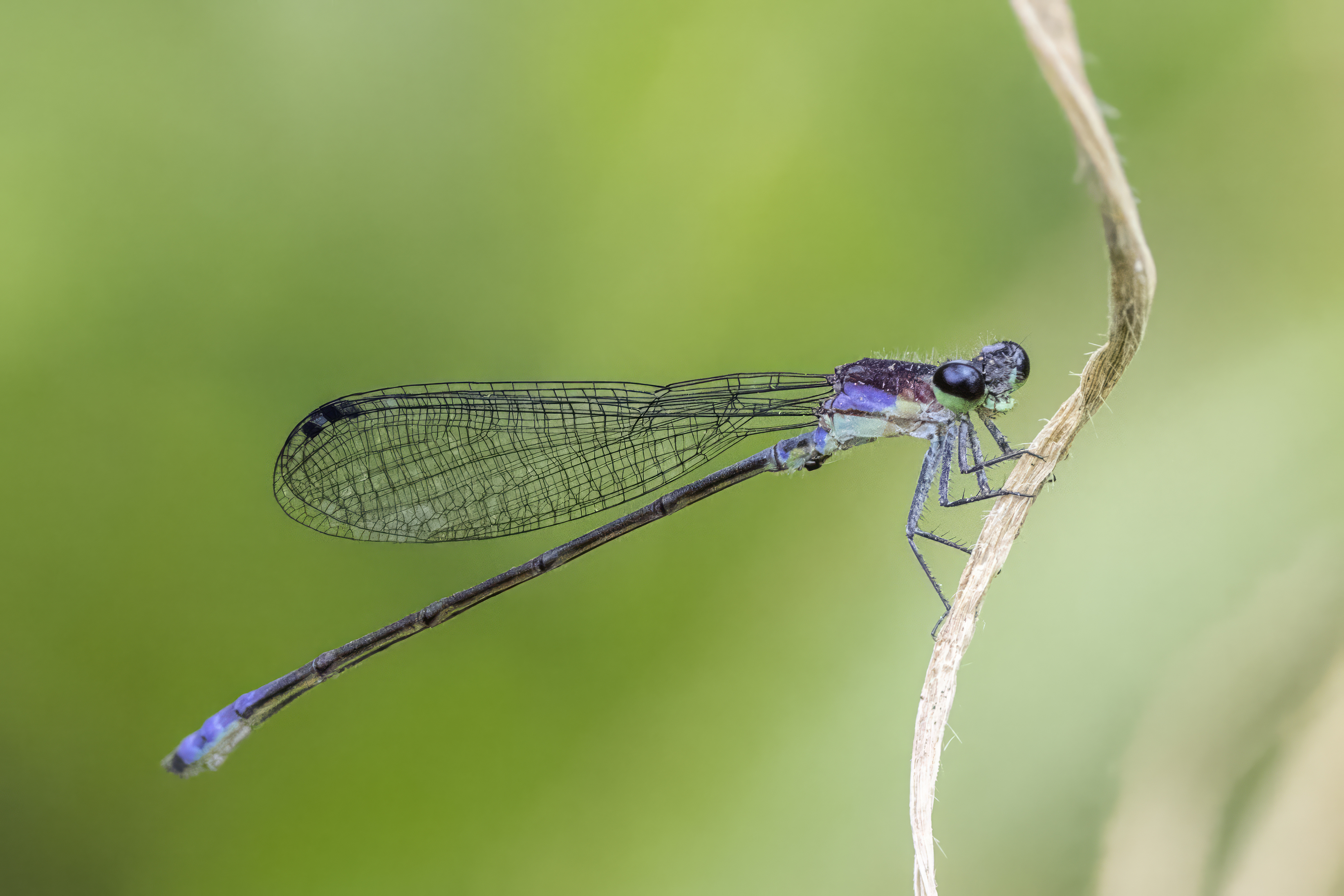
Sky-blue dancer
A. medullaris female

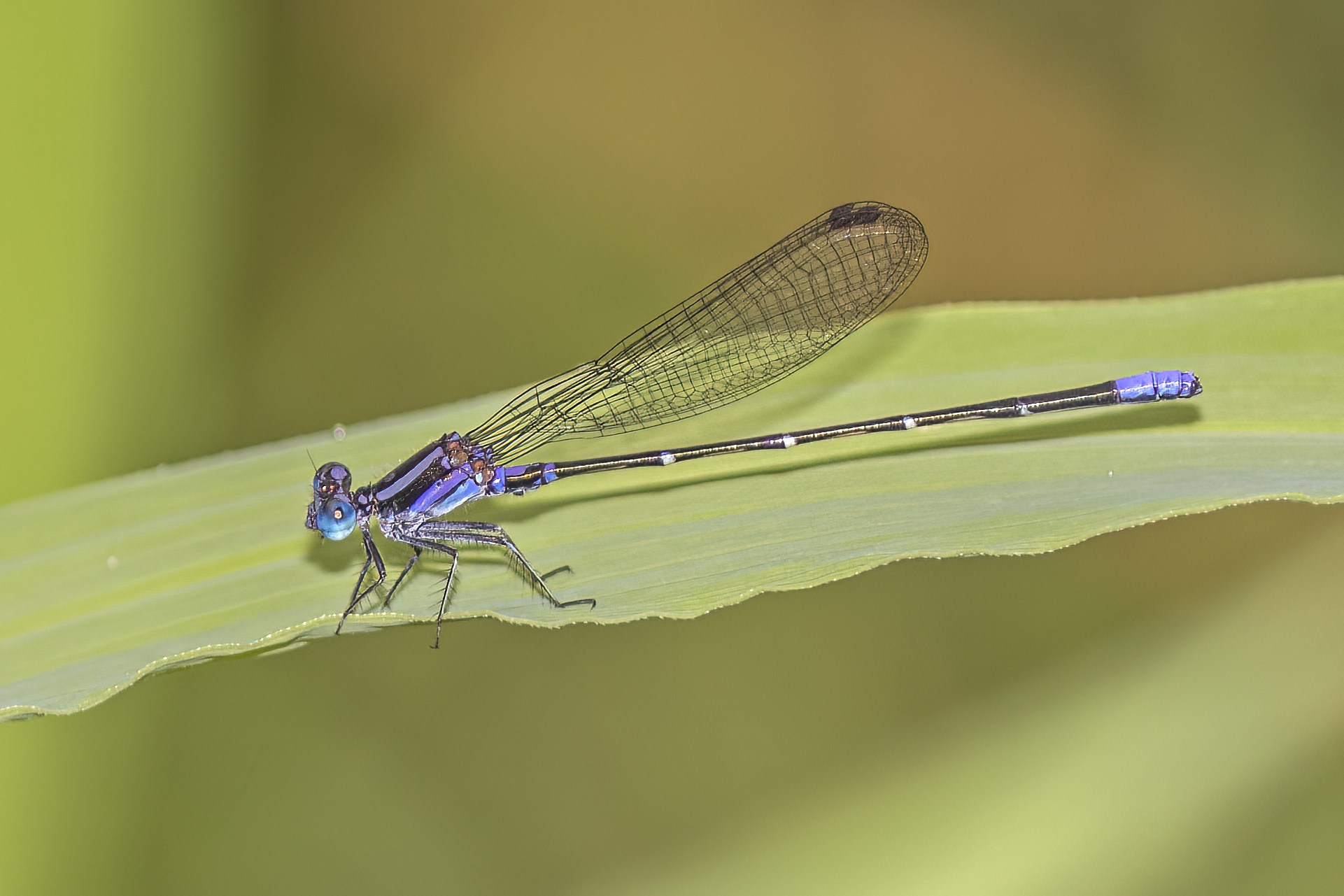
Black-and-purple dancer
A. oculata, male purple form
