= List of damselflies of the world (Coenagrionidae) =

- Acanthagrion abunae
- Acanthagrion adustum
- Acanthagrion aepiolum
- Acanthagrion amazonicum
- Acanthagrion apicale
- Acanthagrion ascendens
- Acanthagrion chacoense
- Acanthagrion chararum
- Acanthagrion cuyabae
- Acanthagrion dichrostigma
- Acanthagrion egleri
- Acanthagrion floridense
- Acanthagrion fluviatile
- Acanthagrion gracile
- Acanthagrion hartei
- Acanthagrion hildegarda
- Acanthagrion indefensum
- Acanthagrion inexpectum
- Acanthagrion jessei
- Acanthagrion kennedii
- Acanthagrion lancea
- Acanthagrion latapistylum
- Acanthagrion longispinosum
- Acanthagrion luteum
- Acanthagrion minutum
- Acanthagrion obsoletum
- Acanthagrion peruanum
- Acanthagrion peruvianum
- Acanthagrion phallicorne
- Acanthagrion quadratum
- Acanthagrion rubrifrons
- Acanthagrion speculum
- Acanthagrion taxaense
- Acanthagrion temporale
- Acanthagrion tepuiense
- Acanthagrion trilobatum
- Acanthagrion truncatum
- Acanthagrion vidua
- Acanthagrion viridescens
- Acanthagrion williamsoni
- Acanthagrion yungarum
- Acanthallagma caeruleum
- Acanthallagma luteum
- Acanthallagma strohmi
- Aceratobasis cornicauda
- Aceratobasis mourei
- Aceratobasis nathaliae
- Aciagrion africanum
- Aciagrion approximans
- Aciagrion azureum
- Aciagrion balachowskyi
- Aciagrion borneense
- Aciagrion brosseti
- Aciagrion dondoense
- Aciagrion fasciculare
- Aciagrion feuerborni
- Aciagrion fragile
- Aciagrion gracile
- Aciagrion hamoni
- Aciagrion heterostictum
- Aciagrion hisopa
- Aciagrion macrootithenae
- Aciagrion migratum
- Aciagrion nodosum
- Aciagrion occidentale
- Aciagrion olympicum
- Aciagrion pallidum
- Aciagrion pinheyi
- Aciagrion rarum
- Aciagrion steeleae
- Aciagrion tillyardi
- Aciagrion tonsillare
- Aciagrion walteri
- Aciagrion zambiense
- Aeolagrion axine
- Aeolagrion dorsale
- Aeolagrion fulvum
- Aeolagrion inca
- Africallagma cuneistigma
- Africallagma elongatum
- Africallagma glaucum
- Africallagma pallidulum
- Africallagma pseudelongatum
- Africallagma rubristigma
- Africallagma sapphirinum
- Africallagma sinuatum
- Africallagma subtile
- Africallagma vaginale
- Agriocnemis aderces
- Agriocnemis alcyone
- Agriocnemis aligulae
- Agriocnemis angolense
- Agriocnemis angustirami
- Agriocnemis argentea
- Agriocnemis carmelita
- Agriocnemis clauseni
- Agriocnemis corbeti
- Agriocnemis dabreui
- Agriocnemis dissimilis
- Agriocnemis dobsoni
- Agriocnemis exilis
- Agriocnemis exsudans
- Agriocnemis falcifera
- Agriocnemis femina
- Agriocnemis forcipata
- Agriocnemis gratiosa
- Agriocnemis interrupta
- Agriocnemis inversa
- Agriocnemis kelarensis
- Agriocnemis kunjina
- Agriocnemis lacteola
- Agriocnemis luteola
- Agriocnemis maclachlani
- Agriocnemis merina
- Agriocnemis minima
- Agriocnemis nana
- Agriocnemis palaeforma
- Agriocnemis pieli
- Agriocnemis pieris
- Agriocnemis pinheyi
- Agriocnemis pygmaea
- Agriocnemis ruberrima
- Agriocnemis rubricauda
- Agriocnemis salomonis
- Agriocnemis sania
- Agriocnemis splendissima
- Agriocnemis thoracalis
- Agriocnemis victoria
- Agriocnemis zerafica
- Amorphostigma armstrongi
- Amorphostigma auricolor
- Amphiagrion abbreviatum
- Amphiagrion saucium
- Amphiallagma parvum
- Amphicnemis amabilis
- Amphicnemis annae
- Amphicnemis bicolor
- Amphicnemis billitonis
- Amphicnemis bonita
- Amphicnemis cantuga
- Amphicnemis circularis
- Amphicnemis dactylostyla
- Amphicnemis dentifer
- Amphicnemis ecornuta
- Amphicnemis erminea
- Amphicnemis flavicornis
- Amphicnemis furcata
- Amphicnemis glauca
- Amphicnemis gracilis
- Amphicnemis incallida
- Amphicnemis kuiperi
- Amphicnemis lestoides
- Amphicnemis madelenae
- Amphicnemis mariae
- Amphicnemis martini
- Amphicnemis pandanicola
- Amphicnemis platystyla
- Amphicnemis remiger
- Amphicnemis smedleyi
- Amphicnmeis wallacii
- Andinagrion garrisoni
- Andinagrion peterseni
- Andinagrion saliceti
- Angelagrion fredericoi
- Angelagrion nathaliae
- Anisagrion allopterum
- Anisagrion inornatum
- Anisagrion kennedyi
- Anisagrion truncatipenne
- Antiagrion antigone
- Antiagrion blanchardi
- Antiagrion gayi
- Antiagrion grinbergsi
- Apanisagrion lais
- Archboldargia gloriosa
- Archboldargia mirifica
- Archboldargia scissorhandsi
- Archibasis crucigera
- Archibasis incisura
- Archibasis melanocyana
- Archibasis mimetes
- Archibasis oscillans
- Archibasis rebeccae
- Archibasis tenella
- Archibasis viola
- Argentagrion ambiguum
- Argentagrion silviae
- Argia adamsi
- Argia agrioides
- Argia alberta
- Argia albistigma
- Argia ambigua
- Argia anceps
- Argia apicalis
- Argia barretti
- Argia bicellulata
- Argia bipunctulata
- Argia botacudo
- Argia calida
- Argia carlcooki
- Argia chapadae
- Argia chelata
- Argia claussenii
- Argia collata
- Argia concinna
- Argia croceipennis
- Argia cupraurea
- Argia cuprea
- Argia cyathigera
- Argia deami
- Argia difficilis
- Argia dives
- Argia eliptica
- Argia emma
- Argia euphorbia
- Argia extranea
- Argia fissa
- Argia fraudatricula
- Argia frequentula
- Argia fulgida
- Argia fumigata
- Argia fumipennis
- Argia funcki
- Argia funebris
- Argia garrisoni
- Argia gaumeri
- Argia gerhardi
- Argia hamulata
- Argia harknessi
- Argia hasemani
- Argia herberti
- Argia hinei
- Argia huanacina
- Argia immunda
- Argia impura
- Argia inculta
- Argia indicatrix
- Argia indocilis
- Argia infrequentula
- Argia infumata
- Argia insipida
- Argia iralai
- Argia jocosa
- Argia joergenseni
- Argia johannella
- Argia jujuya
- Argia kokama
- Argia lacrimans
- Argia leonorae
- Argia lilacina
- Argia limitata
- Argia lugens
- Argia medullaris
- Argia mishuyaca
- Argia modesta
- Argia moesta
- Argia mollis
- Argia munda
- Argia nahuana
- Argia nigrior
- Argia oculata
- Argia oenea
- Argia orichalcea
- Argia pallens
- Argia percellulata
- Argia pima
- Argia pipila
- Argia plana
- Argia pocomana
- Argia popoluca
- Argia pulla
- Argia reclusa
- Argia rectangula
- Argia rhoadsi
- Argia rogersi
- Argia rosseri
- Argia sabino
- Argia sedula
- Argia serva
- Argia smithiana
- Argia sordida
- Argia subapicalis
- Argia talamanca
- Argia tamoyo
- Argia tarascana
- Argia terira
- Argia tezpi
- Argia thespis
- Argia tibialis
- Argia tinctipennis
- Argia tonto
- Argia translata
- Argia tupi
- Argia ulmeca
- Argia underwoodi
- Argia variabilis
- Argia variata
- Argia variegata
- Argia vivida
- Argia westfalli
- Argia yungensis
- Argiagrion leoninum
- Argiocnemis ensifera
- Argiocnemis rubescens
- Argiocnemis solitaria
- Argiocnemis umbargae
- Austroagrion cyane
- Austroagrion exclamationis
- Austroagrion pindrina
- Austroagrion watsoni
- Austroallagma sagittiferum
- Austrocnemis maccullochi
- Austrocnemis obscura
- Austrocnemis splendida
- Austrocoenagrion lyelli
- Azuragrion buchholzi
- Azuragrion granti
- Azuragrion kauderni
- Azuragrion nigridorsum
- Azuragrion somalicum
- Azuragrion vansomereni
- Bedfordia demorsa
- Bedfordia halecarpenteri
- Boninagrion ezoin
- Bromeliagrion beebeanum
- Bromeliagrion fernandezianum
- Bromeliagrion rehni
- Caliagrion billinghursti
- Calvertagrion minutissimum
- Ceriagrion aeruginosum
- Ceriagrion annulosum
- Ceriagrion auranticum
- Ceriagrion auritum
- Ceriagrion azureum
- Ceriagrion bakeri
- Ceriagrion batjanum
- Ceriagrion bellona
- Ceriagrion calamineum
- Ceriagrion cerinorubellum
- Ceriagrion chaoi
- Ceriagrion citrinum
- Ceriagrion coeruleum
- Ceriagrion corallinum
- Ceriagrion coromandelianum
- Ceriagrion fallax
- Ceriagrion georgifreyi
- Ceriagrion glabrum
- Ceriagrion hamoni
- Ceriagrion hoogerwerfi
- Ceriagrion ignitum
- Ceriagrion inaequale
- Ceriagrion indochinense
- Ceriagrion katamborae
- Ceriagrion kordofanicum
- Ceriagrion lieftincki
- Ceriagrion madagazureum
- Ceriagrion malaisei
- Ceriagrion melanurum
- Ceriagrion moorei
- Ceriagrion mourae
- Ceriagrion nigroflavum
- Ceriagrion nigrolineatum
- Ceriagrion nipponicum
- Ceriagrion oblongulum
- Ceriagrion olivaceum
- Ceriagrion pallidum
- Ceriagrion platystigma
- Ceriagrion praetermissum
- Ceriagrion rubellocerinum
- Ceriagrion rubiae
- Ceriagrion sakejii
- Ceriagrion sanguinostigma
- Ceriagrion sinense
- Ceriagrion suave
- Ceriagrion tenellum
- Ceriagrion tricrenaticeps
- Ceriagrion varians
- Ceriagrion whellani
- Chromagrion conditum
- Chrysobasis buchholzi
- Chrysobasis lucifer
- Coenagriocnemis insulare
- Coenagriocnemis ramburi
- Coenagriocnemis reuniense
- Coenagriocnemis rufipes
- Coenagrion amurense
- Coenagrion angulatum
- Coenagrion antiquum
- Coenagrion armatum
- Coenagrion australocaspicum
- Coenagrion bartenevi
- Coenagrion bifurcatum
- Coenagrion brevicauda
- Coenagrion caerulescens
- Coenagrion castellani
- Coenagrion chusanicum
- Coenagrion ecornutum
- Coenagrion exornatum
- Coenagrion glaciale
- Coenagrion hastulatum
- Coenagrion holdereri
- Coenagrion hylas
- Coenagrion intermedium
- Coenagrion interrogatum
- Coenagrion johanssoni
- Coenagrion kashmirum
- Coenagrion lanceolatum
- Coenagrion lehmanni
- Coenagrion lunulatum
- Coenagrion melanoproctum
- Coenagrion mercuriale
- Coenagrion ornatum
- Coenagrion persicum
- Coenagrion ponticum
- Coenagrion puella
- Coenagrion pulchellum
- Coenagrion resolutum
- Coenagrion scitulum
- Coenagrion simillimum
- Coenagrion striatum
- Coenagrion syriacum
- Coenagrion terue
- Coenagrion tugur
- Coenagrion vanbrinkae
- Cyanallagma angelae
- Cyanallagma bonariense
- Cyanallagma ferenigrum
- Cyanallagma interruptum
- Cyanallagma nigrinuchale
- Cyanallagma trimaculatum
- Denticulobasis ariken
- Denticulobasis dunklei
- Denticulobasis garrisoni
- Diceratobasis macrogaster
- Diceratobasis melanogaster
- Dolonagrion fulvellum
- Enacantha caribbea
- Enallagma ambiguum
- Enallagma anna
- Enallagma annexum
- Enallagma antennatum
- Enallagma aspersum
- Enallagma basidens
- Enallagma boreale
- Enallagma cardenium
- Enallagma carunculatum
- Enallagma circulatum
- Enallagma civile
- Enallagma clausum
- Enallagma coecum
- Enallagma concisum
- Enallagma cyathigerum
- Enallagma daeckii
- Enallagma davisi
- Enallagma deserti
- Enallagma divagans
- Enallagma doubledayi
- Enallagma dubium
- Enallagma durum
- Enallagma ebrium
- Enallagma eiseni
- Enallagma exsulans
- Enallagma geminatum
- Enallagma hageni
- Enallagma insula
- Enallagma laterale
- Enallagma longfieldae
- Enallagma maldivense
- Enallagma minusculum
- Enallagma nigrolineatum
- Enallagma novaehispaniae
- Enallagma pallidum
- Enallagma pictum
- Enallagma pollutum
- Enallagma praevarum
- Enallagma recurvatum
- Enallagma risi
- Enallagma rua
- Enallagma schmidti
- Enallagma semicirculare
- Enallagma signatum
- Enallagma sulcatum
- Enallagma traviatum
- Enallagma truncatum
- Enallagma vernale
- Enallagma vesperum
- Enallagma weewa
- Erythromma humerale
- Erythromma lindenii
- Erythromma najas
- Erythromma tinctipennis
- Erythromma viridulum
- Hesperagrion heterodoxum
- Himalagrion exclamatione
- Himalagrion pithoragarhicum
- Homeoura chelifera
- Homeoura lindneri
- Homeoura nepos
- Homeoura obrieni
- Homeoura sobrina
- Hylaeargia magnifica
- Hylaeargia simulatrix
- Hylaeonympha magoi
- Inpabasis hubelli
- Inpabasis machadoi
- Inpabasis rosea
- Ischnura abyssinica
- Ischnura acuticauda
- Ischnura albistigma
- Ischnura aralensis
- Ischnura ariel
- Ischnura asiatica
- Ischnura aurora
- Ischnura barberi
- Ischnura bizonata
- Ischnura blumi
- Ischnura buxtoni
- Ischnura capreola
- Ischnura capreolus
- Ischnura cardinalis
- Ischnura carpenteri
- Ischnura cervula
- Ischnura chromostigma
- Ischnura cruzi
- Ischnura damula
- Ischnura demorsa
- Ischnura denticollis
- Ischnura dorothea
- Ischnura elegans
- Ischnura erratica
- Ischnura evansi
- Ischnura filosa
- Ischnura fluviatilis
- Ischnura forcipata
- Ischnura fountainei
- Ischnura fragilis
- Ischnura gemina
- Ischnura genei
- Ischnura graellsii
- Ischnura haemastigma
- Ischnura haritonovi
- Ischnura hastata
- Ischnura heterosticta
- Ischnura inarmata
- Ischnura indivisa
- Ischnura intermedia
- Ischnura isoetes
- Ischnura kellicotti
- Ischnura lobata
- Ischnura luta
- Ischnura ordosi
- Ischnura pamelae
- Ischnura patricia
- Ischnura perparva
- Ischnura posita
- Ischnura prognata
- Ischnura pruinescens
- Ischnura pumilio
- Ischnura ramburii
- Ischnura rhodosoma
- Ischnura rubella
- Ischnura rubilio
- Ischnura rufostigma
- Ischnura rufovittata
- Ischnura saharensis
- Ischnura sanguinostigma
- Ischnura senegalensis
- Ischnura spinicauda
- Ischnura stueberi
- Ischnura taitensis
- Ischnura thelmae
- Ischnura torresiana
- Ischnura ultima
- Ischnura verticalis
- Ischnura vinsoni
- Leptagrion aculeatum
- Leptagrion acutum
- Leptagrion afonsoi
- Leptagrion andromache
- Leptagrion bocainense
- Leptagrion capixabae
- Leptagrion croceum
- Leptagrion dardanoi
- Leptagrion dispar
- Leptagrion elongatum
- Leptagrion fernandezianum
- Leptagrion garbei
- Leptagrion macrurum
- Leptagrion perlongum
- Leptagrion porrectum
- Leptagrion siqueirai
- Leptagrion vriesianum
- Leptabasis candelaria
- Leptobasis melinogaster
- Leptobasis raineyi
- Leptobasis vacillans
- Leucobasis candicans
- Megalagrion adytum
- Megalagrion amaurodytum
- Megalagrion blackburni
- Megalagrion calliphya
- Megalagrion deceptor
- Megalagrion dinesiotes
- Megalagrion eudytum
- Megalagrion hawaiiense
- Megalagrion heterogamias
- Megalagrion jugorum
- Megalagrion kauaiense
- Megalagrion koelense
- Megalagrion leptodemas
- Megalagrion mauka
- Megalagrion molokaiense
- Megalagrion nesiotes
- Megalagrion nigrohamatum
- Megalagrion oahuense
- Megalagrion oceanicum
- Megalagrion oresitrophum
- Megalagrion orobates
- Megalagrion pacificum
- Megalagrion paludicola
- Megalagrion vagabundum
- Megalagrion williamsoni
- Megalagrion xanthomelas
- Melanesobasis annulata
- Melanesobasis bicellulare
- Melanesobasis corniculata
- Melanesobasis flavilabris
- Melanesobasis macleani
- Melanesobasis maculosa
- Melanesobasis prolixa
- Melanesobasis simmondsi
- Mesamphiagrion demarmelsi
- Mesamphiagrion dunklei
- Mesamphiagrion ecuatoriale
- Mesamphiagrion gaianii
- Mesamphiagrion laterale
- Mesamphiagrion occultum
- Mesamphiagrion ovigerum
- Mesamphiagrion risi
- Mesamphiagrion tamaense
- Mesamphiagrion tepuianum
- Mesoleptobasis acuminata
- Mesoleptobasis cantralli
- Mesoleptobasis cyanolineata
- Mesoleptobasis elongata
- Mesoleptobasis incus
- Metaleptobasis amazonica
- Metaleptobasis bicornis
- Metaleptobasis bovilla
- Metaleptobasis brysonima
- Metaleptobasis diceras
- Metaleptobasis fernandezi
- Metaleptobasis foreli
- Metaleptobasis incisula
- Metaleptobasis lillianae
- Metaleptobasis manicaria
- Metaleptobasis mauffrayi
- Metaleptobasis mauritia
- Metaleptobasis minteri
- Metaleptobasis quadricornis
- Metaleptobasis selysi
- Metaleptobasis tetragena
- Metaleptobasis weibezahni
- Metaleptobasis westfalli
- Millotagrion inaequistigma
- Minagrion caldense
- Minagrion canaanense
- Minagrion mecistogastrum
- Minagrion ribeiroi
- Minagrion waltheri
- Moroagrion danielli
- Mortonagrion aborense
- Mortonagrion amoenum
- Mortonagrion appendiculatum
- Mortonagrion arthuri
- Mortonagrion ceylonicum
- Mortonagrion falcatum
- Mortonagrion forficulatum
- Mortonagrion hirosei
- Mortonagrion martini
- Mortonagrion selenion
- Mortonagrion stygium
- Mortonagrion varralli
- Nehalennia gracilis
- Nehalennia integricollis
- Nehalennia irene
- Nehalennia minuta
- Nehalennia pallidula
- Nehalennia speciosa
- Neoerythromma cultellatum
- Neoerythromma gladiolatum
- Nesobasis angulicollis
- Nesobasis aurantiaca
- Nesobasis bidens
- Nesobasis brachycerca
- Nesobasis caerulecaudata
- Nesobasis caerulescens
- Nesobasis campioni
- Nesobasis comosa
- Nesobasis erythrops
- Nesobasis flavifrons
- Nesobasis flavostigma
- Nesobasis heteroneura
- Nesobasis ingens
- Nesobasis leveri
- Nesobasis longistyla
- Nesobasis malcolmi
- Nesobasis malekulana
- Nesobasis monticola
- Nesobasis nigrostigma
- Nesobasis pedata
- Nesobasis recava
- Nesobasis rufostigma
- Nesobasis selysi
- Nesobasis telegastrum
- Onychargia atrocyana
- Onychargia vittigera
- Oreagrion armeniacum
- Oreagrion lorentzi
- Oreagrion oreadum
- Oreagrion pectingi
- Oreagrion xanthocyane
- Oreiallagma acutum
- Oreiallagma oreas
- Oreiallagma prothoracicum
- Oreiallagma quadricolor
- Oreiallagma thelkterion
- Oxyagrion ablutum
- Oxyagrion basale
- Oxyagrion brevistigma
- Oxyagrion bruchi
- Oxyagrion chapadense
- Oxyagrion evanescens
- Oxyagrion fernandoi
- Oxyagrion haematinum
- Oxyagrion hempeli
- Oxyagrion hermosae
- Oxyagrion imeriense
- Oxyagrion impunctatum
- Oxyagrion machadoi
- Oxyagrion microstigma
- Oxyagrion miniopsis
- Oxyagrion pavidum
- Oxyagrion pseudocardinale
- Oxyagrion rubidum
- Oxyagrion santosi
- Oxyagrion simile
- Oxyagrion sulinum
- Oxyagrion sulmatogrossense
- Oxyagrion tennesseni
- Oxyagrion tennesseni
- Oxyagrion terminale
- Oxyagrion zielmae
- Oxyallagma dissidens
- Pacificagrion dolorosum
- Pacificagrion lachrymosum
- Papuagrion auriculatum
- Papuagrion carcharodon
- Papuagrion corruptum
- Papuagrion degeneratum
- Papuagrion flavipedum
- Papuagrion flavithorax
- Papuagrion fraterculum
- Papuagrion gurneyi
- Papuagrion laminatum
- Papuagrion magnanimum
- Papuagrion occipitale
- Papuagrion prothoracale
- Papuagrion rectangulare
- Papuagrion reductum
- Papuagrion rufipedum
- Papuagrion spinicaudum
- Papuargia stuberi
- Paracercion barbatum
- Paracercion calamorum
- Paracercion dyeri
- Paracercion hieroglyphicum
- Paracercion impar
- Paracercion luzonicum
- Paracercion malayanum
- Paracercion melanotum
- Paracercion pendulum
- Paracercion plagiosum
- Paracercion sieboldii
- Paracercion v-nigrum
- Paracercion yunnanensis
- Pericnemis stictica
- Pericnemis triangularis
- Phoenicagrion flammeum
- Phoenicagrion paulsoni
- Pinheyagrion angolicum
- Plagulibasis ciliata
- Proischnura polychromaticum
- Proischnura rotundipenne
- Proischnura subfurcatum
- Protallagma titicacae
- Pseudagrion acaciae
- Pseudagrion aguessei
- Pseudagrion alcicorne
- Pseudagrion ambatoroae
- Pseudagrion ampolomitae
- Pseudagrion andamanicum
- Pseudagrion angolense
- Pseudagrion apicale
- Pseudagrion approximatum
- Pseudagrion arabicum
- Pseudagrion assegaii
- Pseudagrion aureofrons
- Pseudagrion australasiae
- Pseudagrion azureum
- Pseudagrion basicornu
- Pseudagrion bernardi
- Pseudagrion bicoerulans
- Pseudagrion bidentatum
- Pseudagrion buenafei
- Pseudagrion caffrum
- Pseudagrion calosomum
- Pseudagrion camerunense
- Pseudagrion celebense
- Pseudagrion cheliferum
- Pseudagrion chloroceps
- Pseudagrion cingillum
- Pseudagrion citricola
- Pseudagrion civicum
- Pseudagrion coarctatum
- Pseudagrion coeleste
- Pseudagrion coeruleipunctum
- Pseudagrion commoniae
- Pseudagrion coomansi
- Pseudagrion coriaceum
- Pseudagrion crocops
- Pseudagrion cyathiforme
- Pseudagrion deconcertans
- Pseudagrion decorum
- Pseudagrion deningi
- Pseudagrion dispar
- Pseudagrion divaricatum
- Pseudagrion draconis
- Pseudagrion dundoense
- Pseudagrion emarginatum
- Pseudagrion epiphonematicum
- Pseudagrion estesi
- Pseudagrion evanidum
- Pseudagrion farinicolle
- Pseudagrion fisheri
- Pseudagrion flavipes
- Pseudagrion furcigerum
- Pseudagrion gamblesi
- Pseudagrion giganteum
- Pseudagrion gigas
- Pseudagrion glaucescens
- Pseudagrion glaucoideum
- Pseudagrion greeni
- Pseudagrion grilloti
- Pseudagrion guichardi
- Pseudagrion hageni
- Pseudagrion hamoni
- Pseudagrion hamulus
- Pseudagrion helenae
- Pseudagrion hypermelas
- Pseudagrion igniceps
- Pseudagrion ignifer
- Pseudagrion incisurum
- Pseudagrion inconspicuum
- Pseudagrion indicum
- Pseudagrion ingrid
- Pseudagrion inopinatum
- Pseudagrion jedda
- Pseudagrion kaffinum
- Pseudagrion kersteni
- Pseudagrion kibalense
- Pseudagrion laidlawi
- Pseudagrion lalakense
- Pseudagrion lindicum
- Pseudagrion lucidum
- Pseudagrion lucifer
- Pseudagrion macrolucidum
- Pseudagrion makabusiense
- Pseudagrion malabaricum
- Pseudagrion malagasoides
- Pseudagrion malgassicum
- Pseudagrion massaicum
- Pseudagrion melanicterum
- Pseudagrion mellisi
- Pseudagrion merina
- Pseudagrion microcephalum
- Pseudagrion mohelii
- Pseudagrion newtoni
- Pseudagrion nigripes
- Pseudagrion nigrofasciatum
- Pseudagrion niloticum
- Pseudagrion nubicum
- Pseudagrion olsufieffi
- Pseudagrion pacificum
- Pseudagrion palauense
- Pseudagrion papuense
- Pseudagrion pelecotomum
- Pseudagrion perfuscatum
- Pseudagrion pilidorsum
- Pseudagrion pontogenes
- Pseudagrion pruinosum
- Pseudagrion pterauratum
- Pseudagrion punctum
- Pseudagrion quadrioculatum
- Pseudagrion renaudi
- Pseudagrion risi
- Pseudagrion rubriceps
- Pseudagrion rufocinctum
- Pseudagrion rufostigma
- Pseudagrion salisburyense
- Pseudagrion samoense
- Pseudagrion schmidtianum
- Pseudagrion serrulatum
- Pseudagrion seyrigi
- Pseudagrion silaceum
- Pseudagrion simile
- Pseudagrion simonae
- Pseudagrion simplicilaminatum
- Pseudagrion sjostedti
- Pseudagrion spencei
- Pseudagrion spernatum
- Pseudagrion spinithoracicum
- Pseudagrion starreanum
- Pseudagrion stuckenbergi
- Pseudagrion sublacteum
- Pseudagrion sudanicum
- Pseudagrion symoensii
- Pseudagrion syriacum
- Pseudagrion thenartum
- Pseudagrion tinctipenne
- Pseudagrion torridum
- Pseudagrion tricorne
- Pseudagrion trigonale
- Pseudagrion umsingaziense
- Pseudagrion ungulatum
- Pseudagrion ustum
- Pseudagrion vaalense
- Pseudagrion vakoanae
- Pseudagrion vumbaense
- Pseudagrion williamsi
- Pseudagrion williamsoni
- Pyrrhosoma elisabethae
- Pyrrhosoma nymphula
- Pyrrhosoma tinctipenne
- Rhodischnura nursei
- Schistolobos boliviensis
- Skiallagma baueri
- Stenagrion dubium
- Stenagrion petermilleri
- Teinobasis aerides
- Teinobasis agriocnemis
- Teinobasis albula
- Teinobasis alluaudi
- Teinobasis alternans
- Teinobasis aluensis
- Teinobasis angusticlavia
- Teinobasis annamalija
- Teinobasis ariel
- Teinobasis aurea
- Teinobasis bradleyi
- Teinobasis budeni
- Teinobasis buwaldai
- Teinobasis carolinensis
- Teinobasis chionopleura
- Teinobasis combusta
- Teinobasis corolla
- Teinobasis debeauforti
- Teinobasis debeauxi
- Teinobasis dolabrata
- Teinobasis dominula
- Teinobasis euglena
- Teinobasis filamenta
- Teinobasis filiformis
- Teinobasis filum
- Teinobasis fortis
- Teinobasis fulgens
- Teinobasis gracillima
- Teinobasis hamalaineni
- Teinobasis helvola
- Teinobasis imitans
- Teinobasis kiautai
- Teinobasis kirbyi
- Teinobasis laglaizei
- Teinobasis laidlawi
- Teinobasis lorquini
- Teinobasis luciae
- Teinobasis malawiensis
- Teinobasis metallica
- Teinobasis micans
- Teinobasis nigra
- Teinobasis nigrolutea
- Teinobasis nitescens
- Teinobasis obtusilingua
- Teinobasis olivacea
- Teinobasis olthofi
- Teinobasis palauensis
- Teinobasis ponapensis
- Teinobasis pretiosa
- Teinobasis prothoracica
- Teinobasis pulverulenta
- Teinobasis rajah
- Teinobasis ranee
- Teinobasis recurva
- Teinobasis rubricauda
- Teinobasis ruficollis
- Teinobasis rufithorax
- Teinobasis samaritis
- Teinobasis scintillans
- Teinobasis serena
- Teinobasis simulans
- Teinobasis sjupp
- Teinobasis stigmatizans
- Teinobasis strigosa
- Teinobasis suavis
- Teinobasis superba
- Teinobasis tenuis
- Teinobasis wallacei
- Telagrion boliviense
- Telagrion cornicauda
- Telagrion diceras
- Telagrion longum
- Telagrion macilenta
- Telagrion mourei
- Telagrion nathaliae
- Telagrion oreas
- Telagrion quadricolor
- Telebasis abuna
- Telebasis aurea
- Telebasis bastiaani
- Telebasis bickorum
- Telebasis boomsmae
- Telebasis brevis
- Telebasis byersi
- Telebasis carmesina
- Telebasis carminita
- Telebasis carota
- Telebasis carvalhoi
- Telebasis coccinea
- Telebasis collopistes
- Telebasis corallina
- Telebasis corbeti
- Telebasis demarara
- Telebasis digiticollis
- Telebasis dominicana
- Telebasis dunklei
- Telebasis erythrina
- Telebasis farcimentum
- Telebasis filiola
- Telebasis flammeola
- Telebasis fluviatilis
- Telebasis garleppi
- Telebasis garrisoni
- Telebasis gigantea
- Telebasis griffinii
- Telebasis inalata
- Telebasis incolumis
- Telebasis isthmica
- Telebasis leptocyclia
- Telebasis levis
- Telebasis livida
- Telebasis milleri
- Telebasis obsoleta
- Telebasis paraensei
- Telebasis racenisi
- Telebasis rubricauda
- Telebasis salva
- Telebasis sanguinalis
- Telebasis selaopyge
- Telebasis simulacrum
- Telebasis simulata
- Telebasis theodori
- Telebasis versicolor
- Telebasis vulcanoae
- Telebasis vulnerata
- Telebasis watsoni
- Telebasis williamsoni
- Telebasis willinki
- Tepuibasis chimantai
- Tepuibasis fulva
- Tepuibasis garciana
- Tepuibasis neblinae
- Tepuibasis nigra
- Tepuibasis rubicunda
- Tepuibasis thea
- Thermagrion webbianum
- Tigriagrion aurantinigrum
- Tuberculobasis arara
- Tuberculobasis cardinalis
- Tuberculobasis costalimai
- Tuberculobasis geijskesi
- Tuberculobasis guarani
- Tuberculobasis inversa
- Tuberculobasis karitiana
- Tuberculobasis macuxi
- Tuberculobasis mammilaris
- Tuberculobasis tirio
- Tuberculobasis yanomami
- Xanthagrion erythroneurum
- Xanthocnemis sinclairi
- Xanthocnemis sobrina
- Xanthocnemis tuanuii
- Xanthocnemis zealandica
- Xiphiagrion cyanomelas
- Xiphiagrion truncatum
- Zoniagrion exclamationis
