= Argiagrion =

Scientific classification
- Kingdom: Animalia
- Phylum: Arthropoda
- Class: Insecta
- Order: Odonata
- Suborder: Zygoptera
- Family: Coenagrionidae
- Genus: Argiagrion; Selys, 1876

Genus of damselflies

Argiagrion is a genus of damselfly in the family Coenagrionidae. It is monotypic in that it contains only one species, Argiagrion leoninum.
