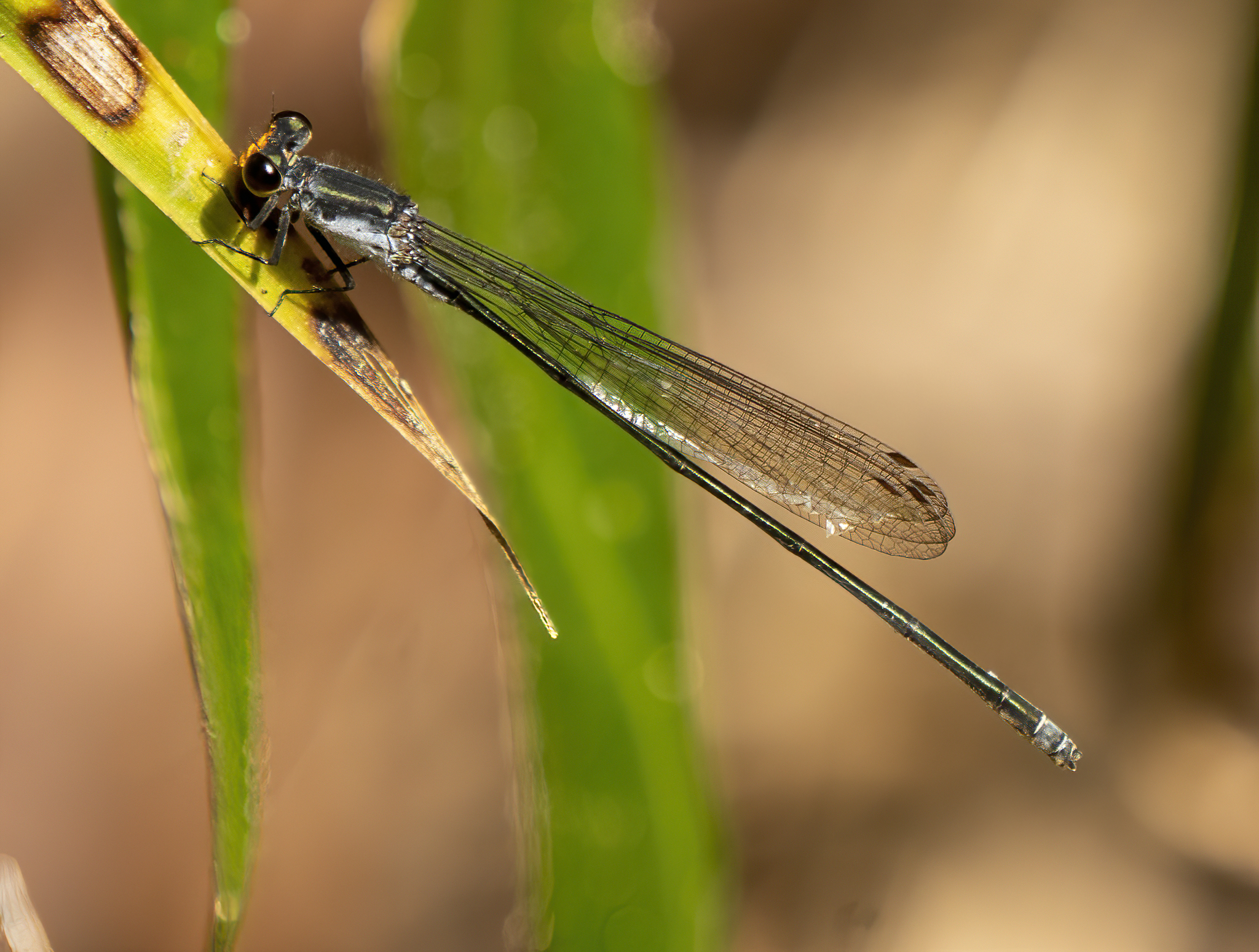
- Male
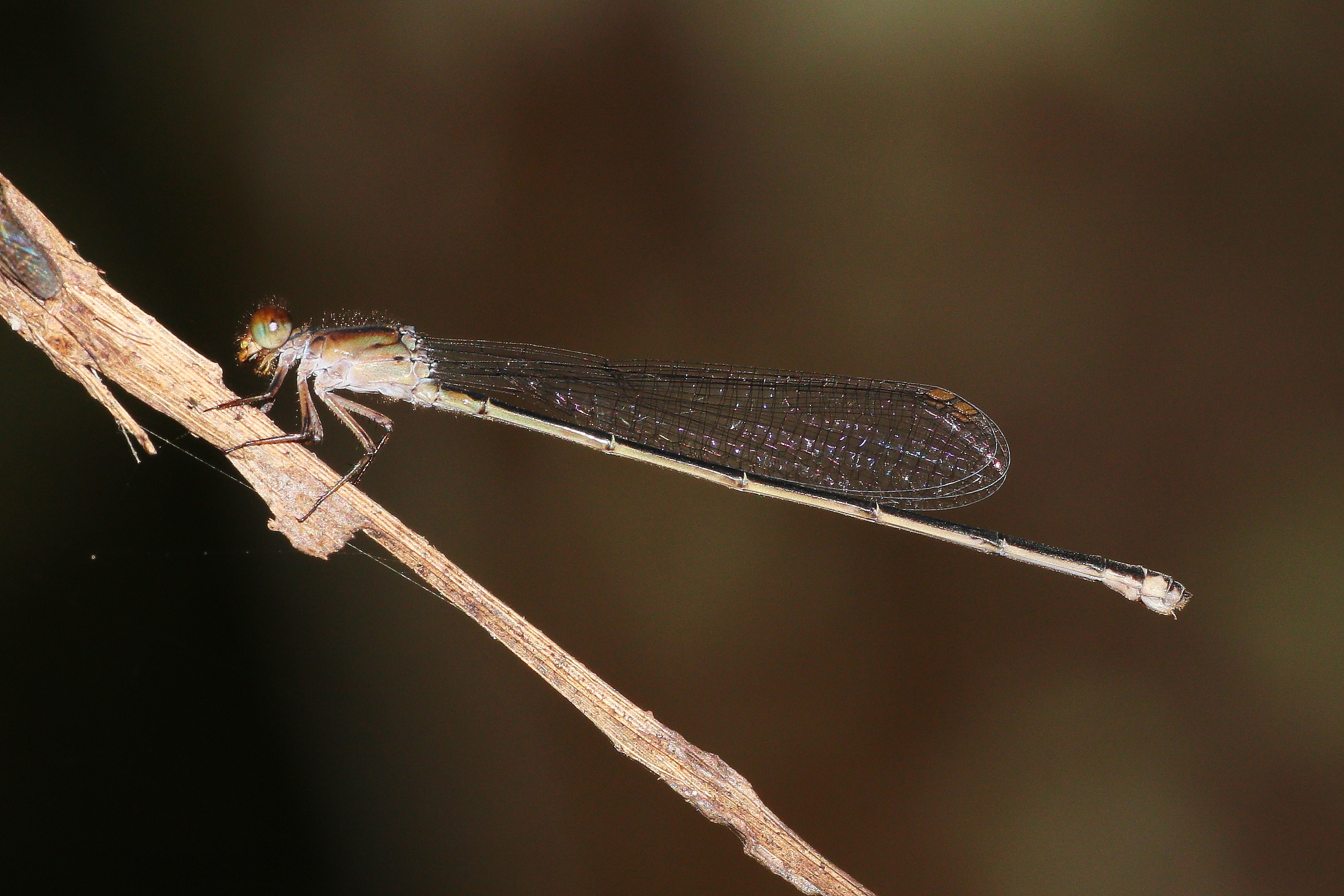
- Female

Conservation status
- Least Concern (IUCN 3.1)

Scientific classification
- Kingdom: Animalia
- Phylum: Arthropoda
- Clade: Pancrustacea
- Class: Insecta
- Order: Odonata
- Suborder: Zygoptera
- Family: Coenagrionidae
- Genus: Pseudagrion
- Species: P. lucifer

Binomial name
- Pseudagrion lucifer Theischinger, 1997

Synonyms
- Pseudagrion ignifer aureum Theischinger, 1997

= Pseudagrion lucifer =

Citrine-headed riverdamsel

Species of damselfly

Pseudagrion lucifer is a species of damselfly in the family Coenagrionidae, commonly known as a citrine-headed riverdamsel. It is found in northern Australia, where it inhabits streams.

Pseudagrion lucifer is a medium-sized damselfly. Males of the species have yellow faces and pruinose sides to their bodies and start of their tails; males from Cape York in Queensland have cream-yellow faces, whilst those from the Kimberley region in Western Australia have bright yellow faces.

Pseudagrion lucifer appears similar to Pseudagrion ignifer which is found in eastern Australia.

== Etymology ==
The genus name Pseudagrion is derived from the Greek ψευδής (pseudēs, "false" or "not true"), combined with Agrion, a genus name derived from the Greek ἄγριος (agrios, "wild"). Agrion was the name given in 1775 by Johan Christian Fabricius for all damselflies.

The species name lucifer is Latin for "light-bringer" (often used for the "morning star"), referring to the bright face of the male.

== Gallery ==
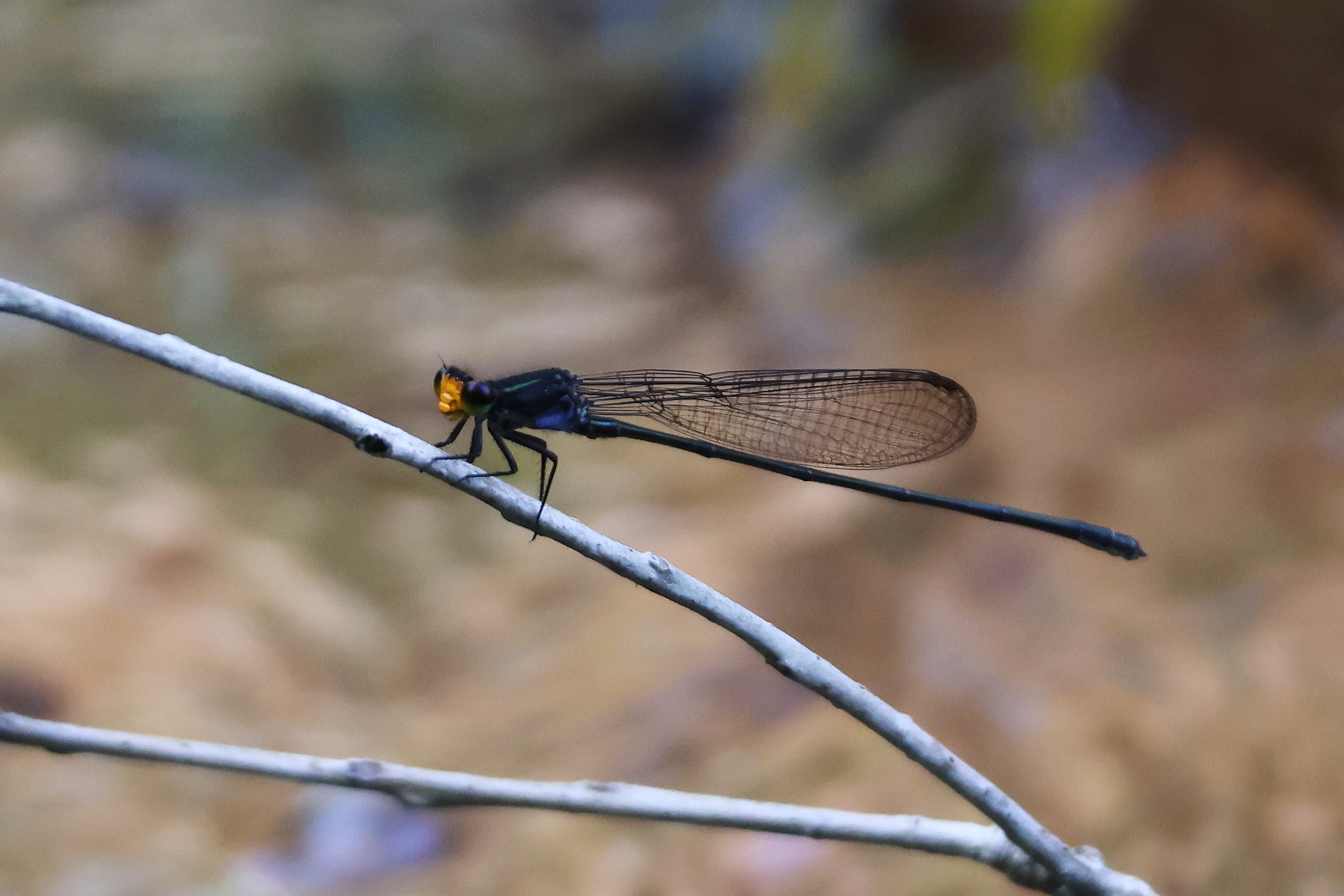
Male, Northern territory

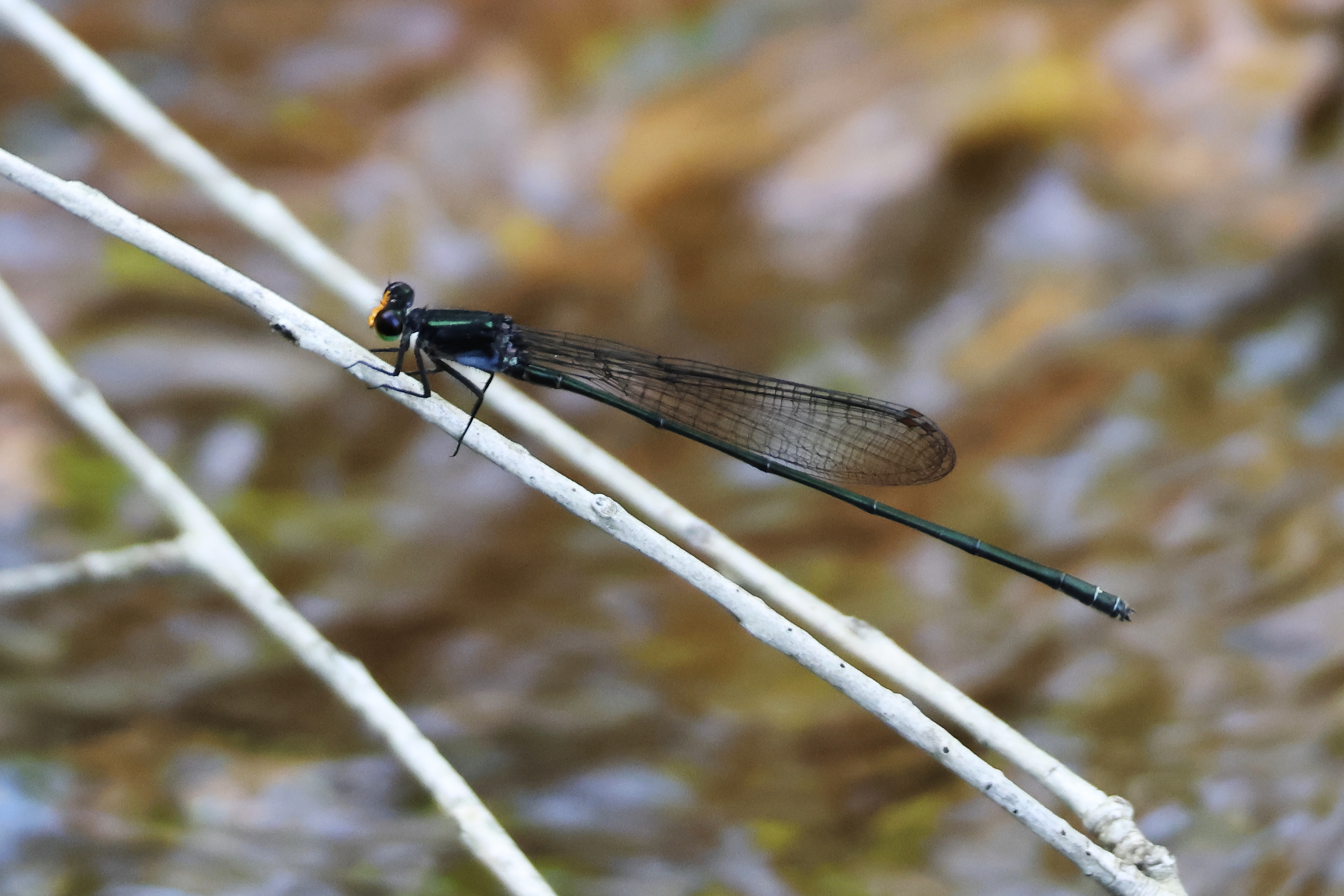
Male

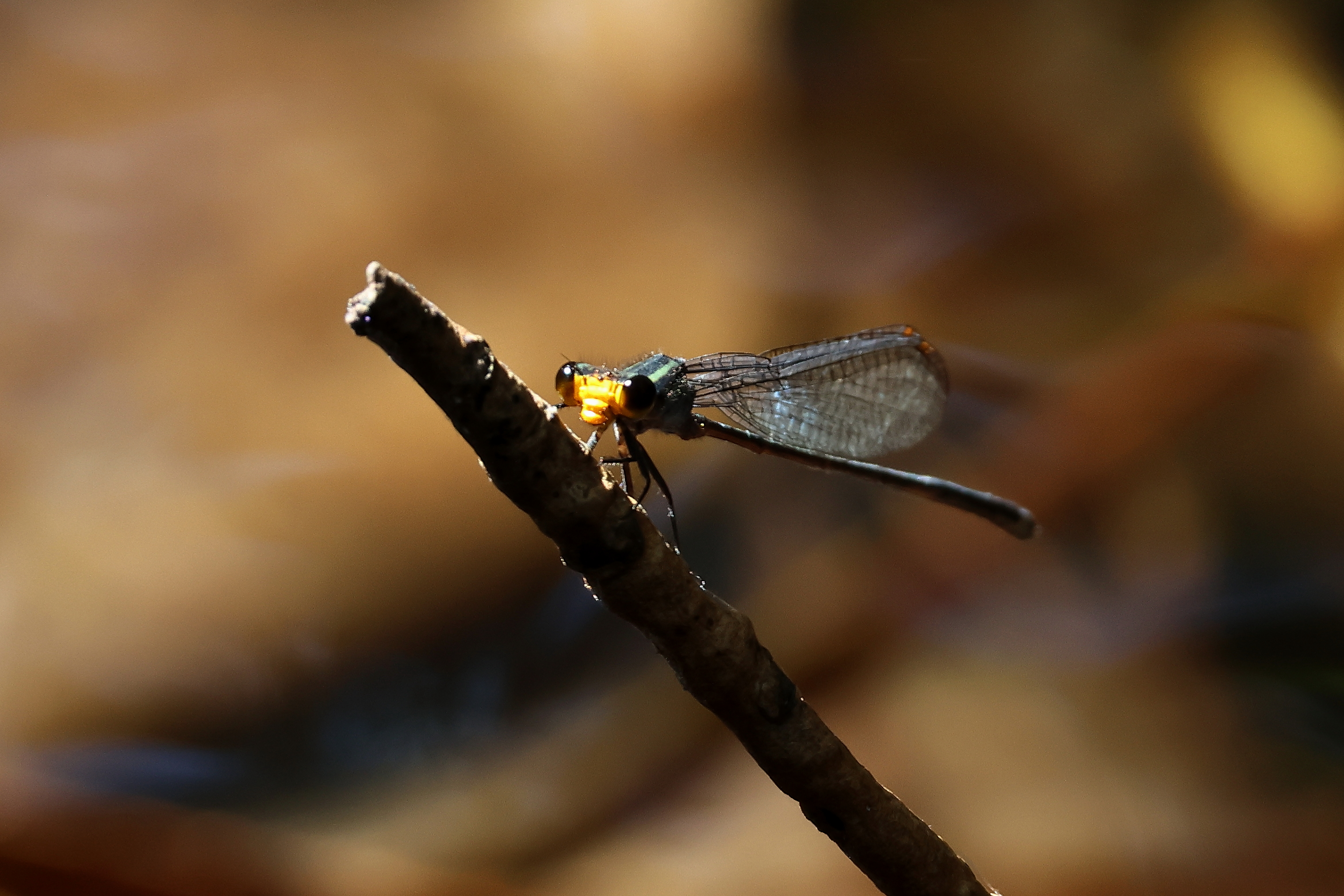
Male face

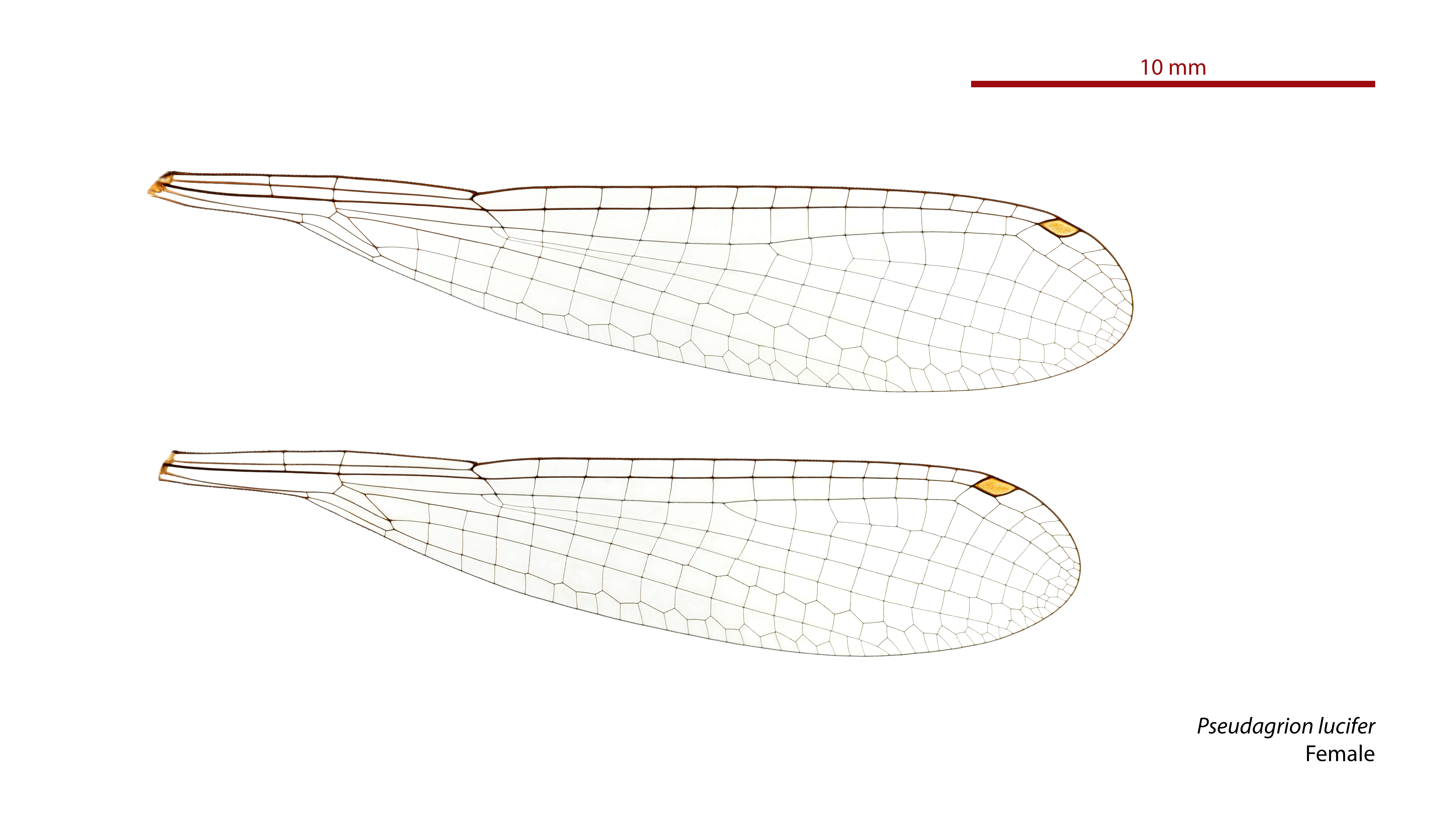
Female wings

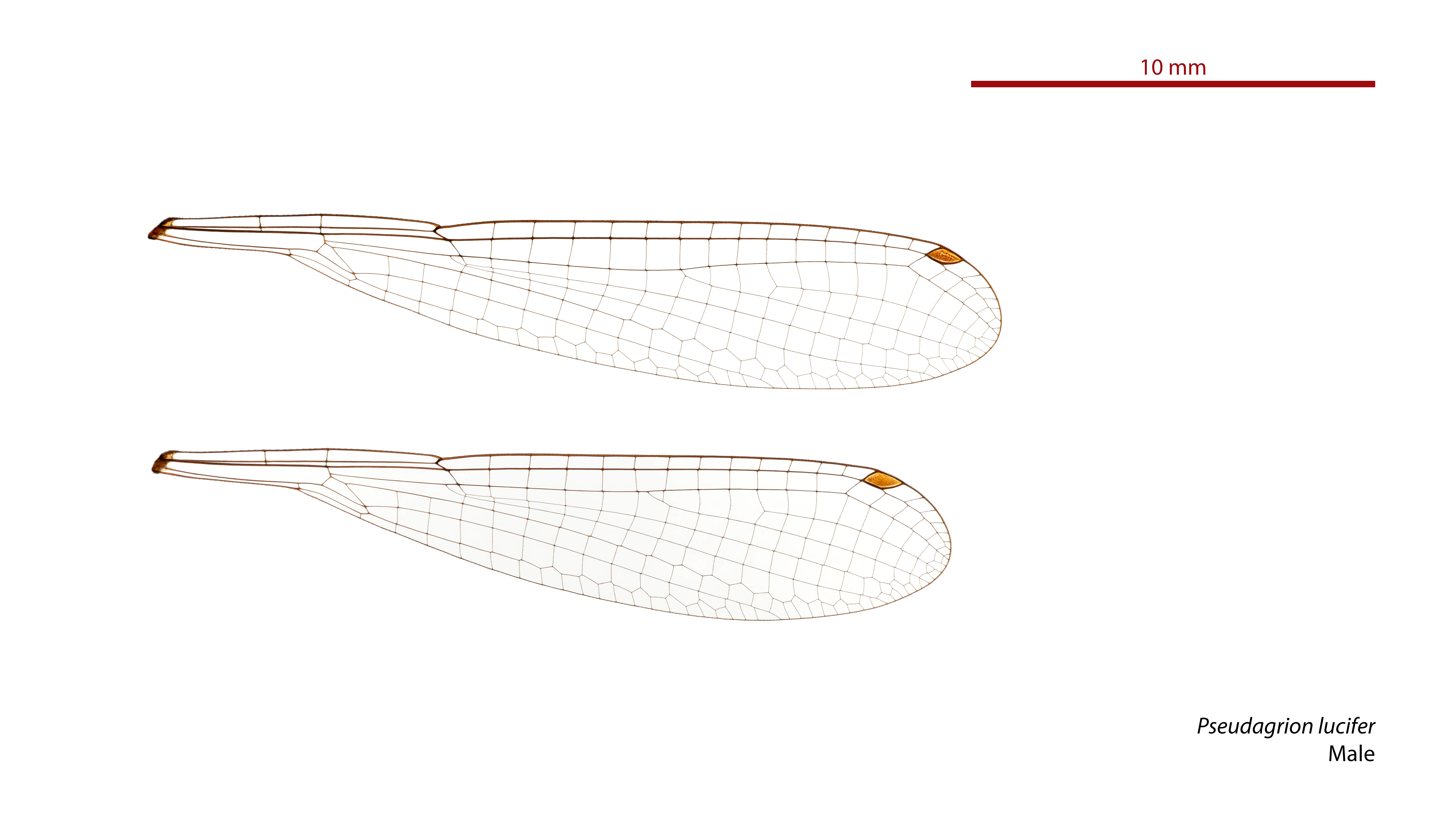
Male wings

== See also ==
- List of Odonata species of Australia
