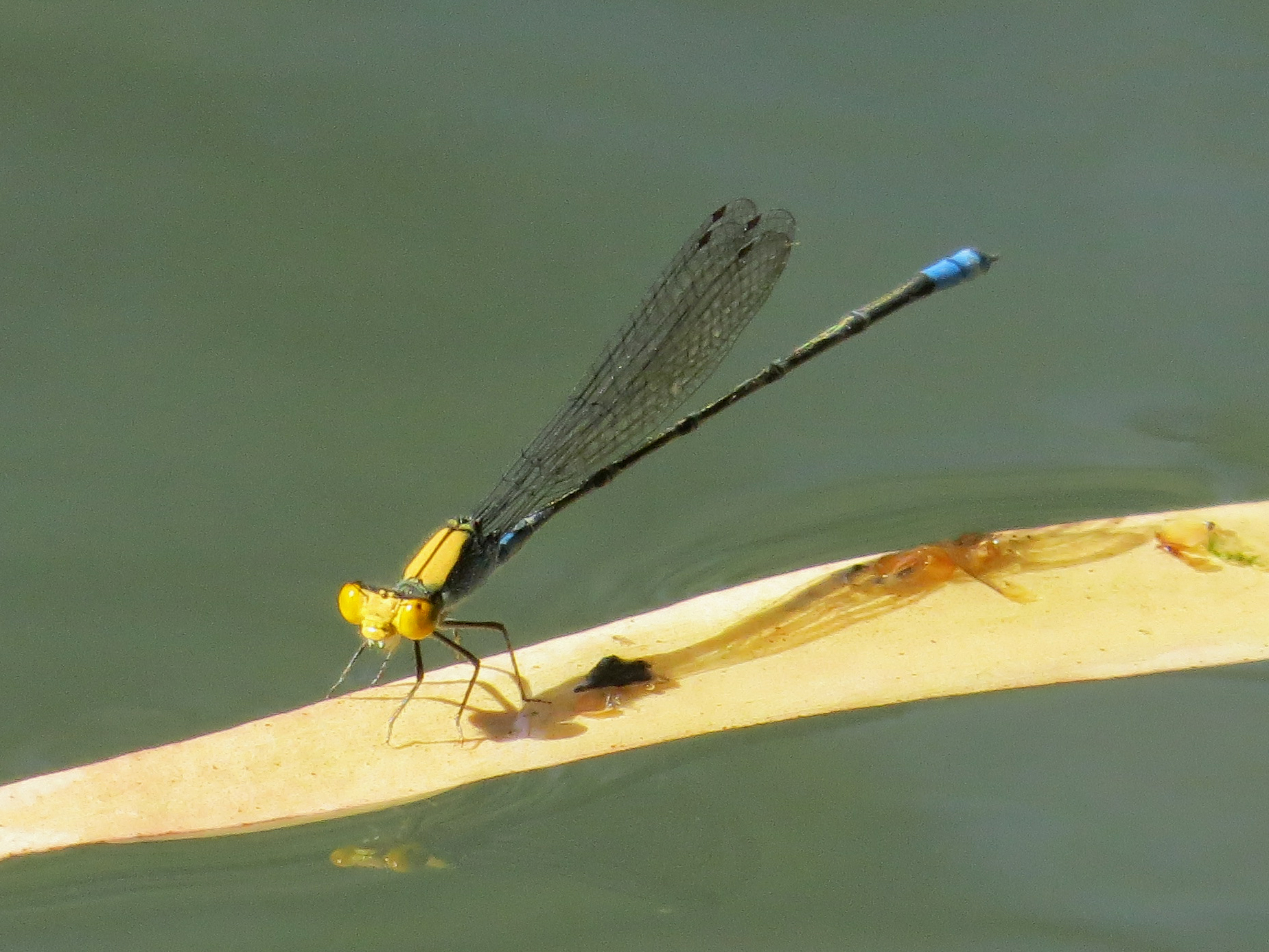

Conservation status
- Least Concern (IUCN 3.1)

Scientific classification
- Kingdom: Animalia
- Phylum: Arthropoda
- Clade: Pancrustacea
- Class: Insecta
- Order: Odonata
- Suborder: Zygoptera
- Family: Coenagrionidae
- Genus: Pseudagrion
- Species: P. aureofrons

Binomial name
- Pseudagrion aureofrons Tillyard, 1906

= Gold-fronted riverdamsel =

Species of damselfly

The gold-fronted riverdamsel (Pseudagrion aureofrons) is a damselfly species in the family Coenagrionidae. Its body length is 36 millimeters. They are also known as gold-fronted sprites. Gold-fronted riverdamsels can be found near running or still water. They usually fly close to the surface of water, sometimes resting on floating material. They may not be as abundant as their relative the blue riverdamsel, but they are easily recognized by their golden-yellow faces and thorax. Its status is fairly common. They can be found cruising above the water on sunny days along slow-flowing sections of creeks.

== Distribution ==
This damselfly species can be found in all mainland Australian States.

== Etymology ==
The genus name Pseudagrion is derived from the Greek ψευδής (pseudēs, "false" or "not true"), combined with Agrion, a genus name derived from the Greek ἄγριος (agrios, "wild"). Agrion was the name given in 1775 by Johan Christian Fabricius for all damselflies.

The species name aureofrons is derived from the Latin aureus ("golden") and frons ("forehead" or "brow"), referring to the distinctive golden-yellow colour on the front of the head.

== Gallery ==
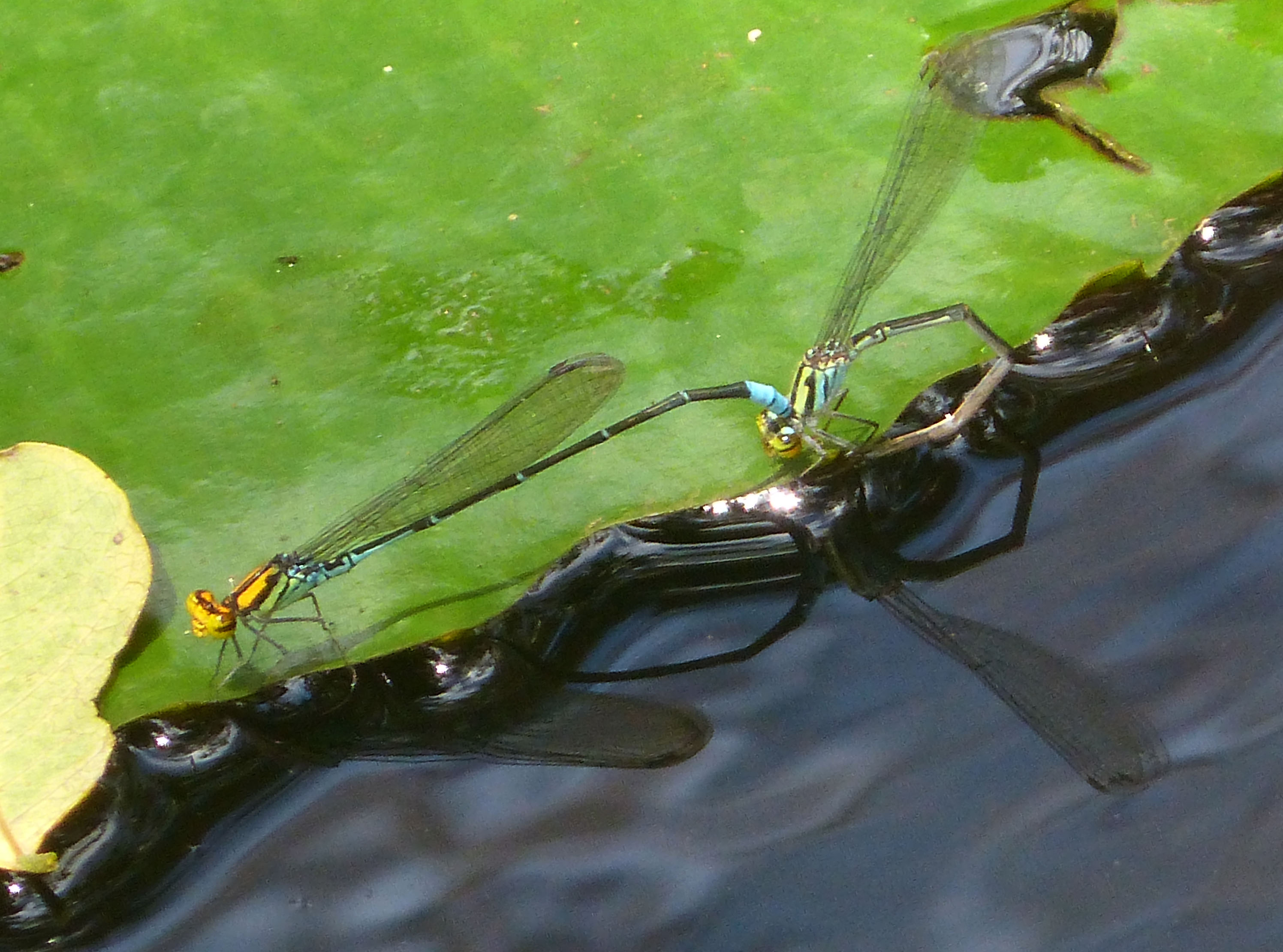
Mating

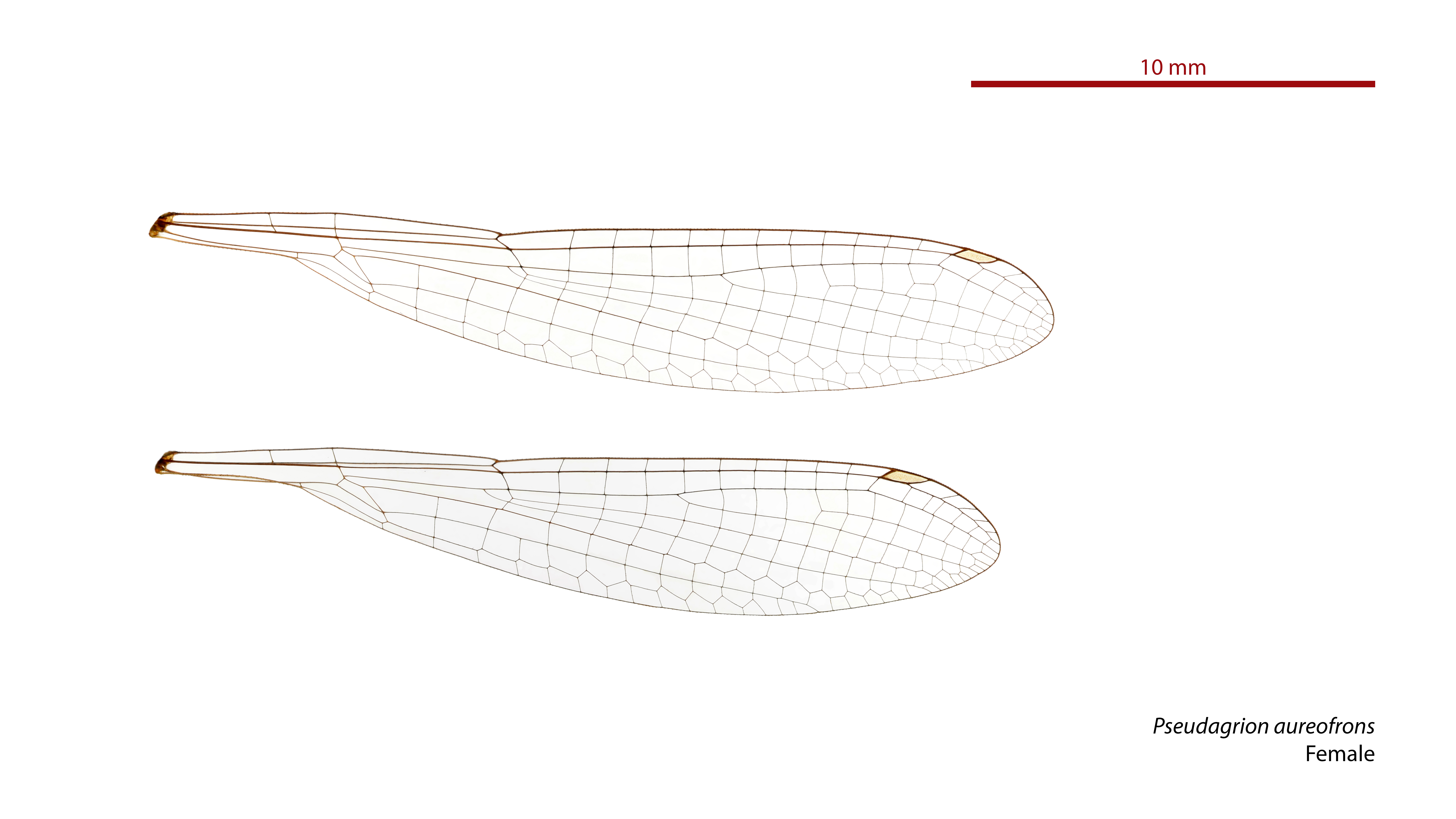
Female wings

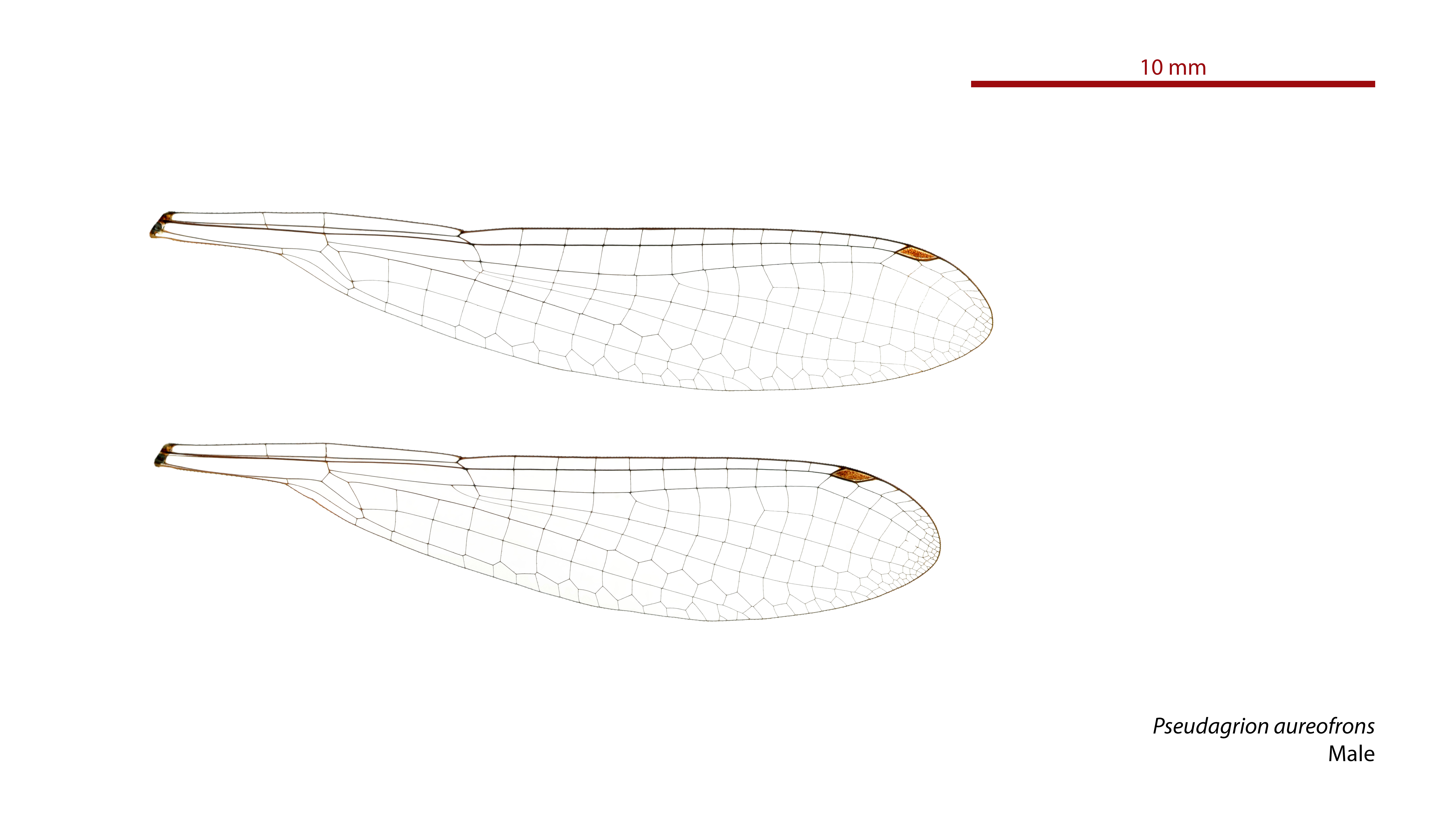
Male wings
