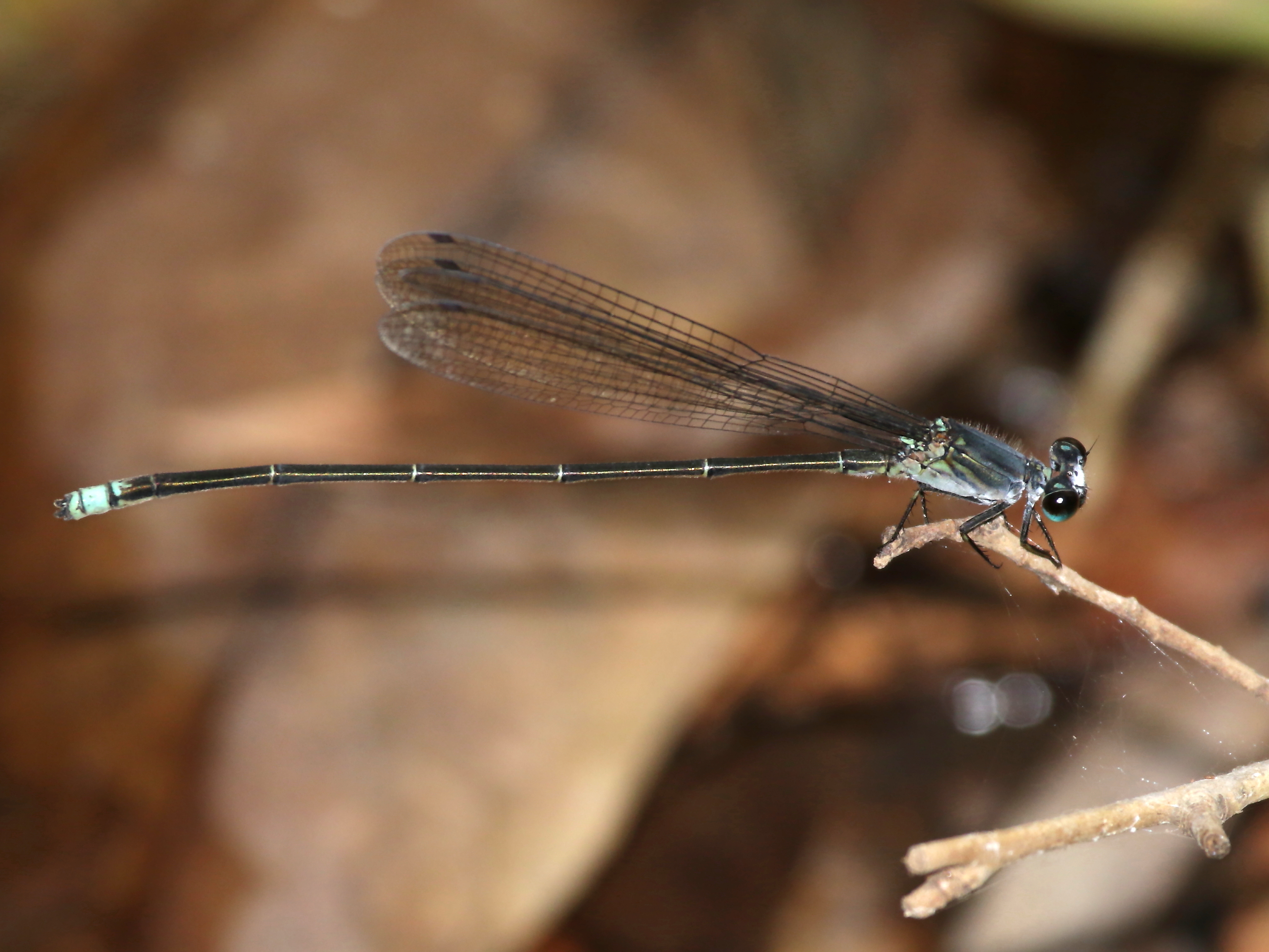
- Male Pseudagrion jedda at Katherine, Northern Territory

Conservation status
- Least Concern (IUCN 3.1)

Scientific classification
- Kingdom: Animalia
- Phylum: Arthropoda
- Clade: Pancrustacea
- Class: Insecta
- Order: Odonata
- Suborder: Zygoptera
- Family: Coenagrionidae
- Genus: Pseudagrion
- Species: P. jedda

Binomial name
- Pseudagrion jedda Watson & Theischinger, 1991

= Pseudagrion jedda =

Dusky riverdamsel

Species of damselfly

Pseudagrion jedda is a species of damselfly in the family Coenagrionidae, commonly known as a dusky riverdamsel. It is a large, dull and darkly coloured damselfly, found in northern Australia, where it inhabits streams and lagoons.

== Etymology ==
The genus name Pseudagrion is derived from the Greek ψευδής (pseudēs, "false" or "not true"), combined with Agrion, a genus name derived from the Greek ἄγριος (agrios, "wild"). Agrion was the name given in 1775 by Johan Christian Fabricius for all damselflies.

The species name jedda is named after the 1955 film Jedda, parts of which were filmed near Katherine, Northern Territory, the type locality.

== Gallery ==
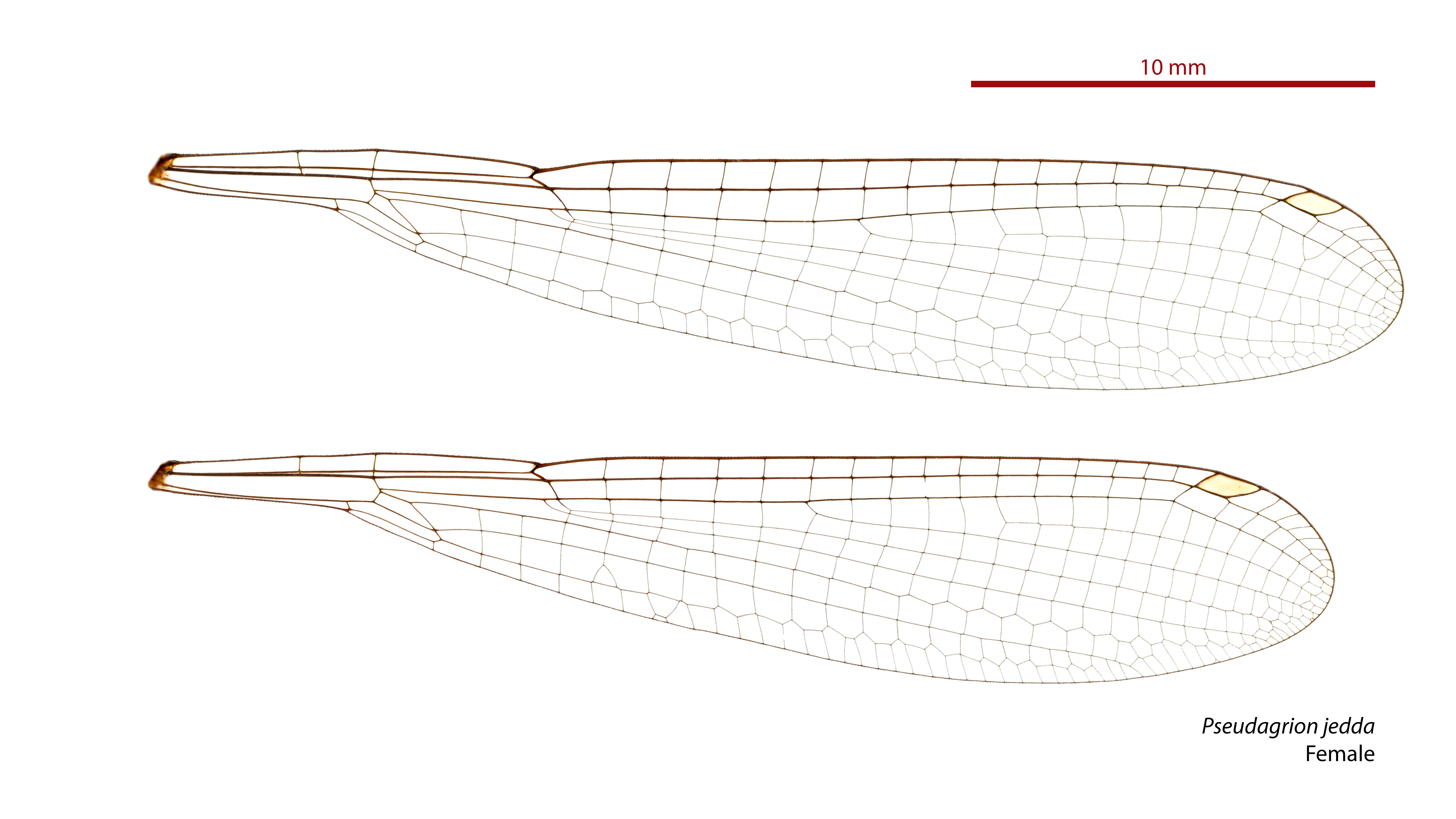
Female wings

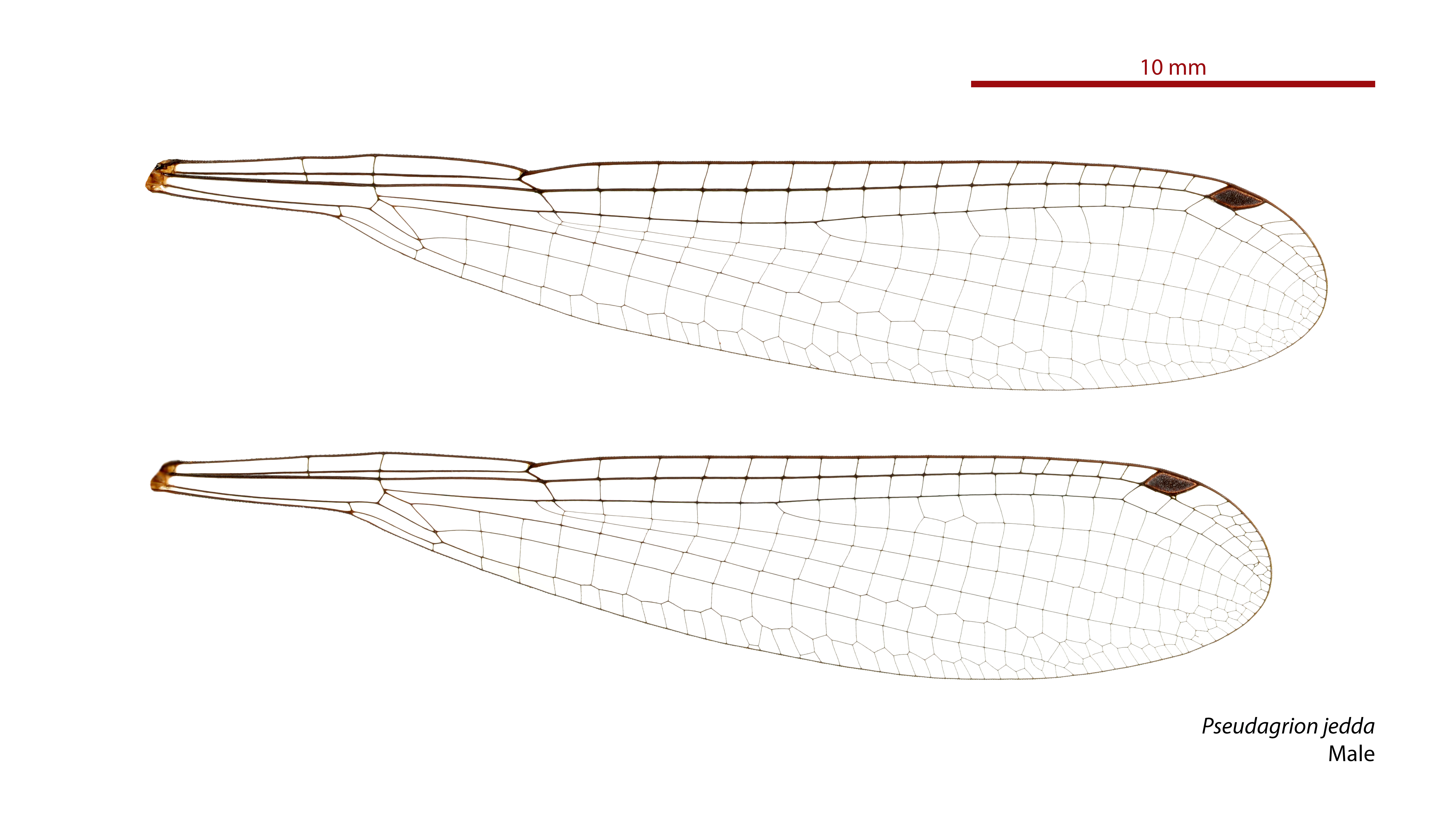
Male wings

== See also ==
- List of Odonata species of Australia
