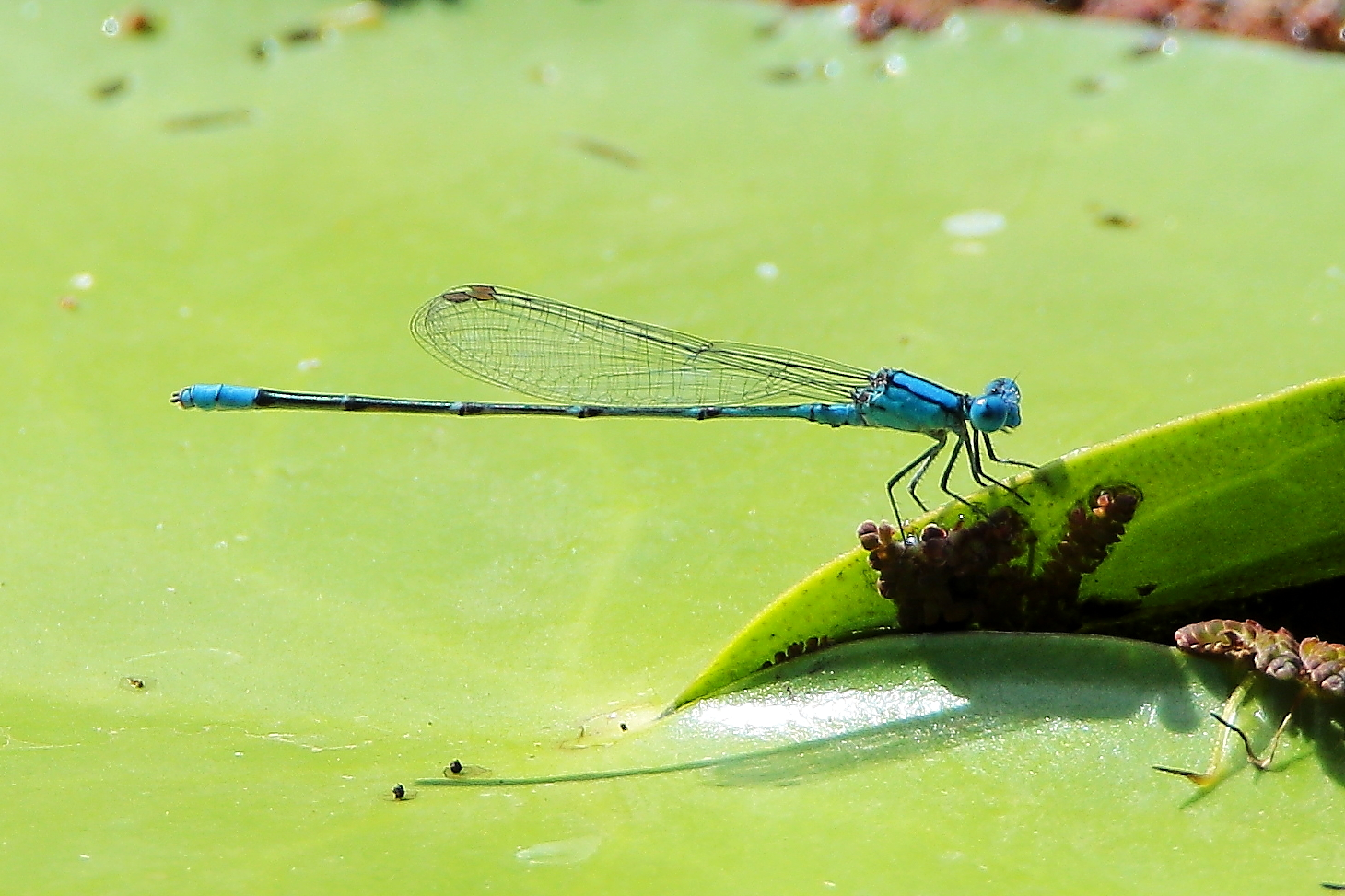
- Male, Mareeba, Queensland

Conservation status
- Least Concern (IUCN 3.1)

Scientific classification
- Kingdom: Animalia
- Phylum: Arthropoda
- Clade: Pancrustacea
- Class: Insecta
- Order: Odonata
- Suborder: Zygoptera
- Family: Coenagrionidae
- Genus: Pseudagrion
- Species: P. cingillum

Binomial name
- Pseudagrion cingillum (Brauer, 1869)

Synonyms
- Agrion cingillum Brauer, 1869; Pseudagrion papuense Tillyard, 1926

= Pseudagrion cingillum =

Northern riverdamsel

Species of damselfly

Pseudagrion cingillum is a species of damselfly in the family Coenagrionidae, commonly known as a northern riverdamsel. It is a medium-sized, blue and black damselfly. It is found in northern Australia and New Guinea, where it inhabits streams, pools and ponds.

== Etymology ==
The genus name Pseudagrion is derived from the Greek ψευδής (pseudēs, "false" or "not true"), combined with Agrion, a genus name derived from the Greek ἄγριος (agrios, "wild"). Agrion was the name given in 1775 by Johan Christian Fabricius for all damselflies.

The species name cingillum is the diminutive of the Latin cingulum ("girdle"), meaning "small girdle", likely referring to the narrow abdominal rings.

== Gallery ==
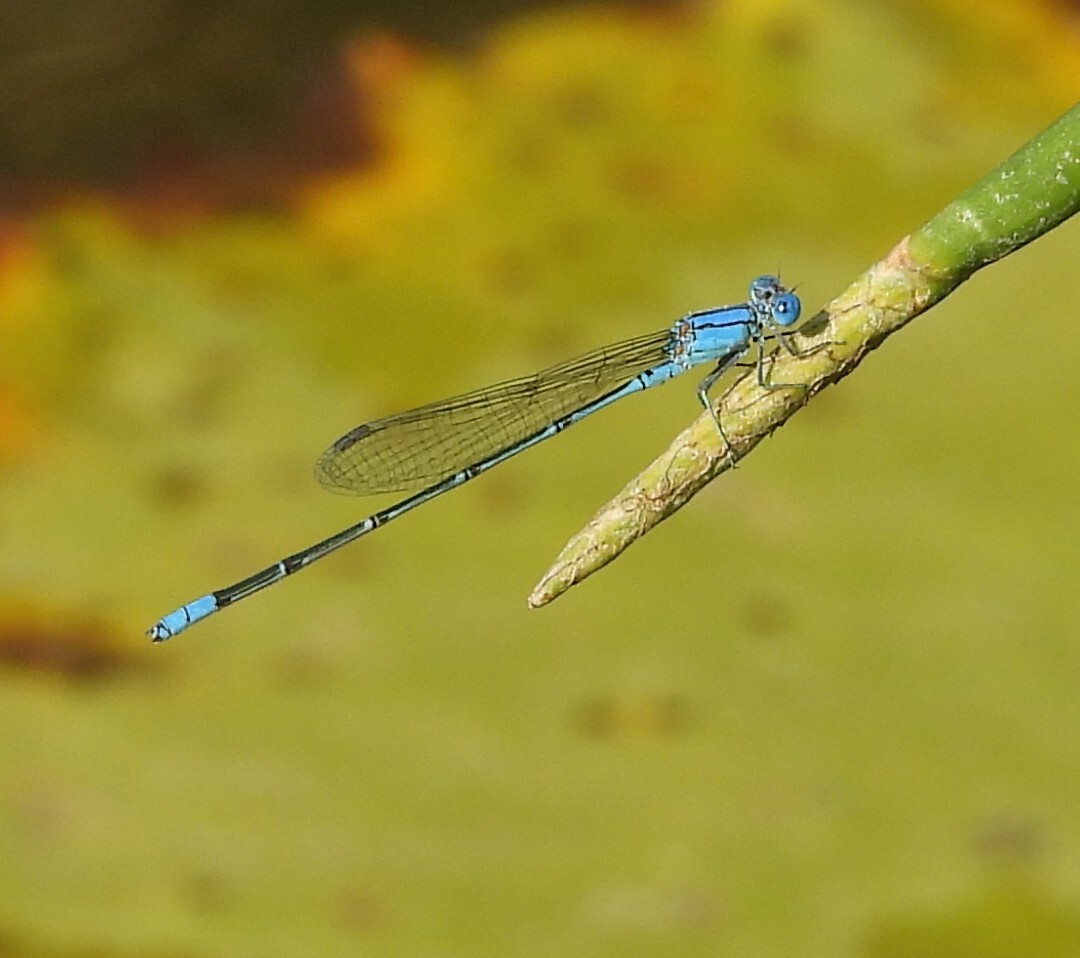
Male

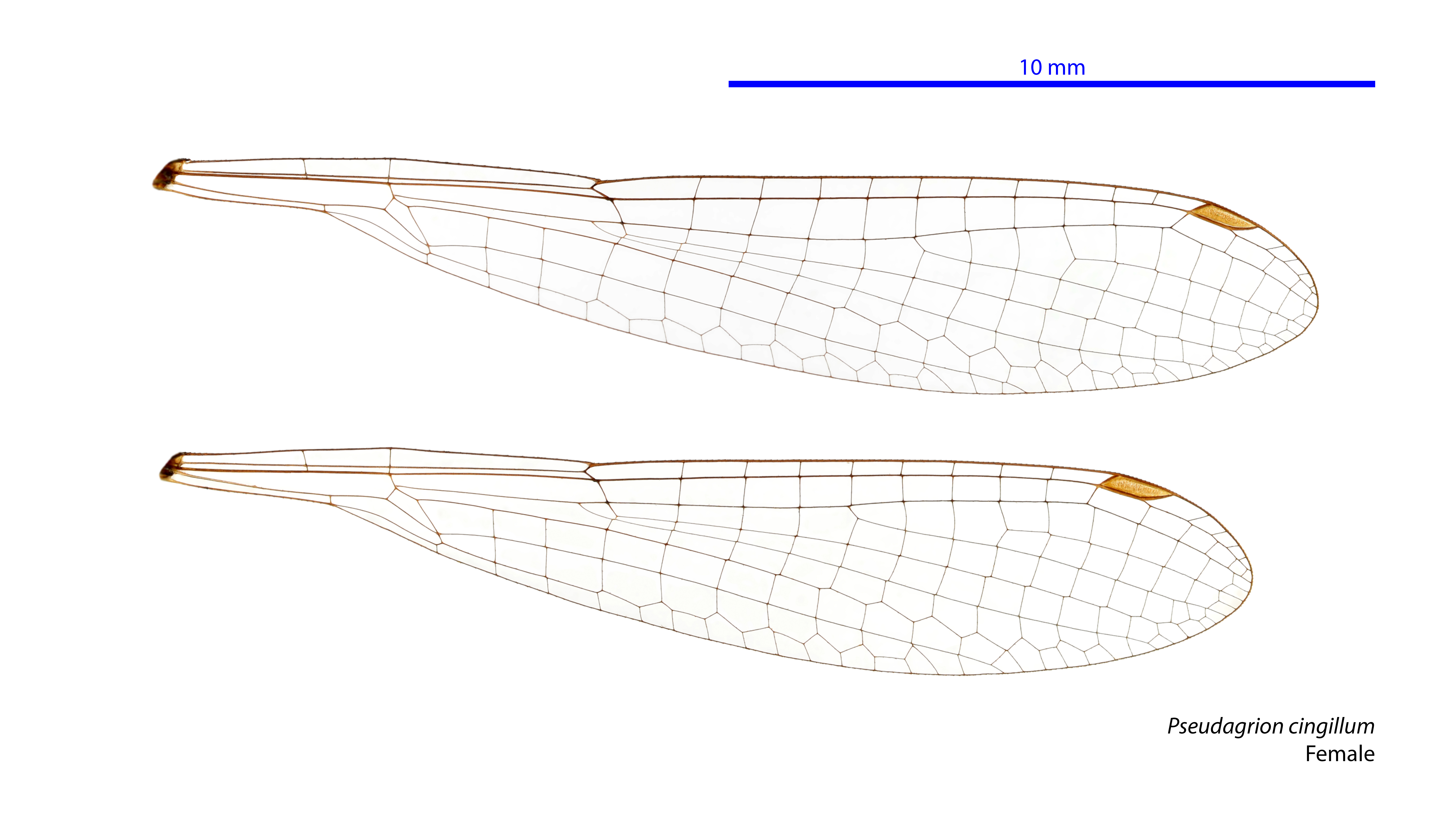
Female wings

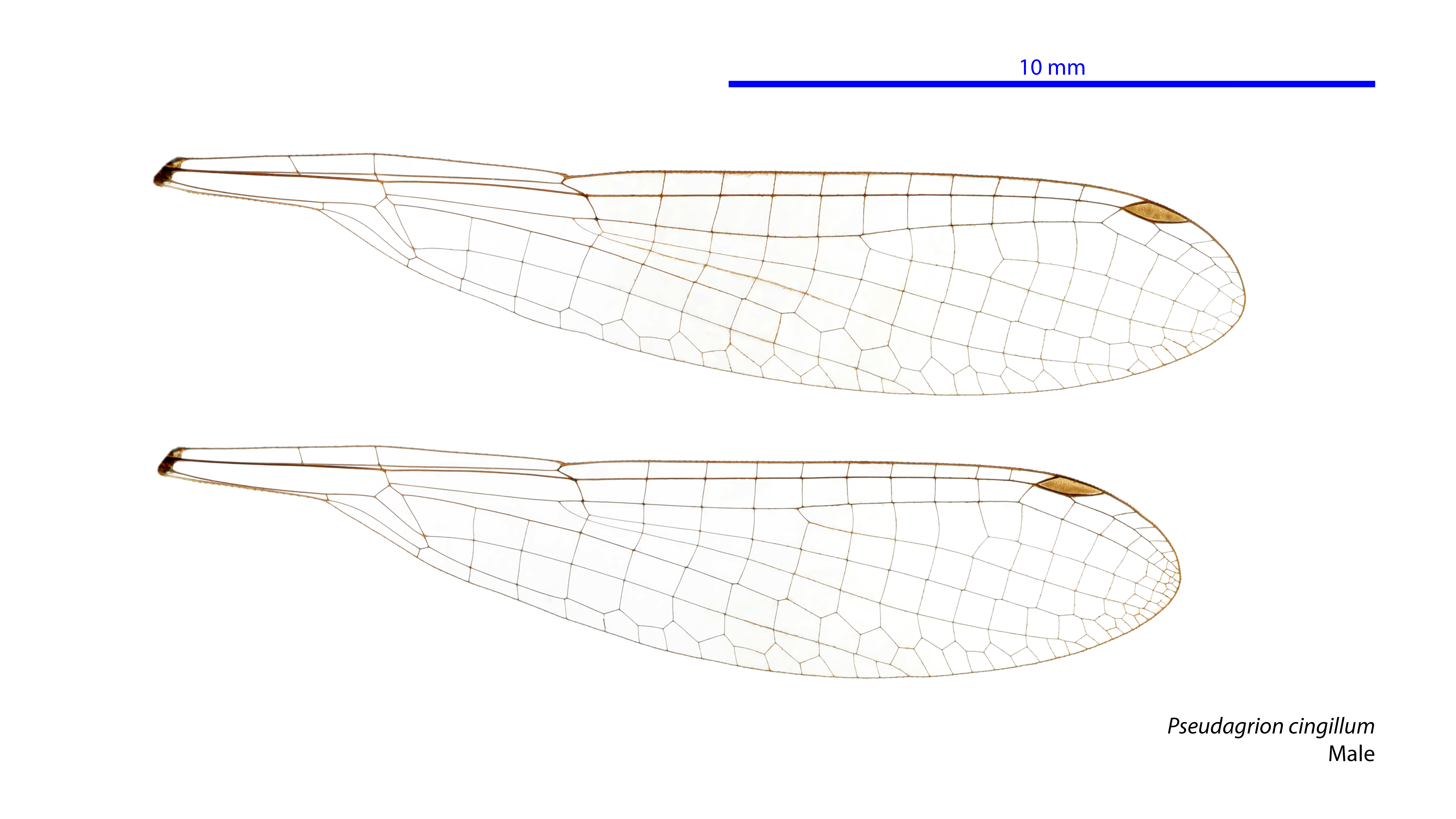
Male wings

== See also ==
- List of Odonata species of Australia
