= Diceratobasis =

Scientific classification
- Kingdom: Animalia
- Phylum: Arthropoda
- Class: Insecta
- Order: Odonata
- Suborder: Zygoptera
- Family: Coenagrionidae
- Genus: Diceratobasis; Kennedy, 1920

Genus of dragonflies

Diceratobasis is a genus of damselfly in the family Coenagrionidae. The larva of species in this genus live in water that is trapped in bromeliads.

It contains the following species:

- Diceratobasis macrogaster (Selys in Sagra, 1857) - Jamaican bromeliad damsel
- Diceratobasis melanogaster Garrison, 1986 - Hispaniolan bromeliad damsel
