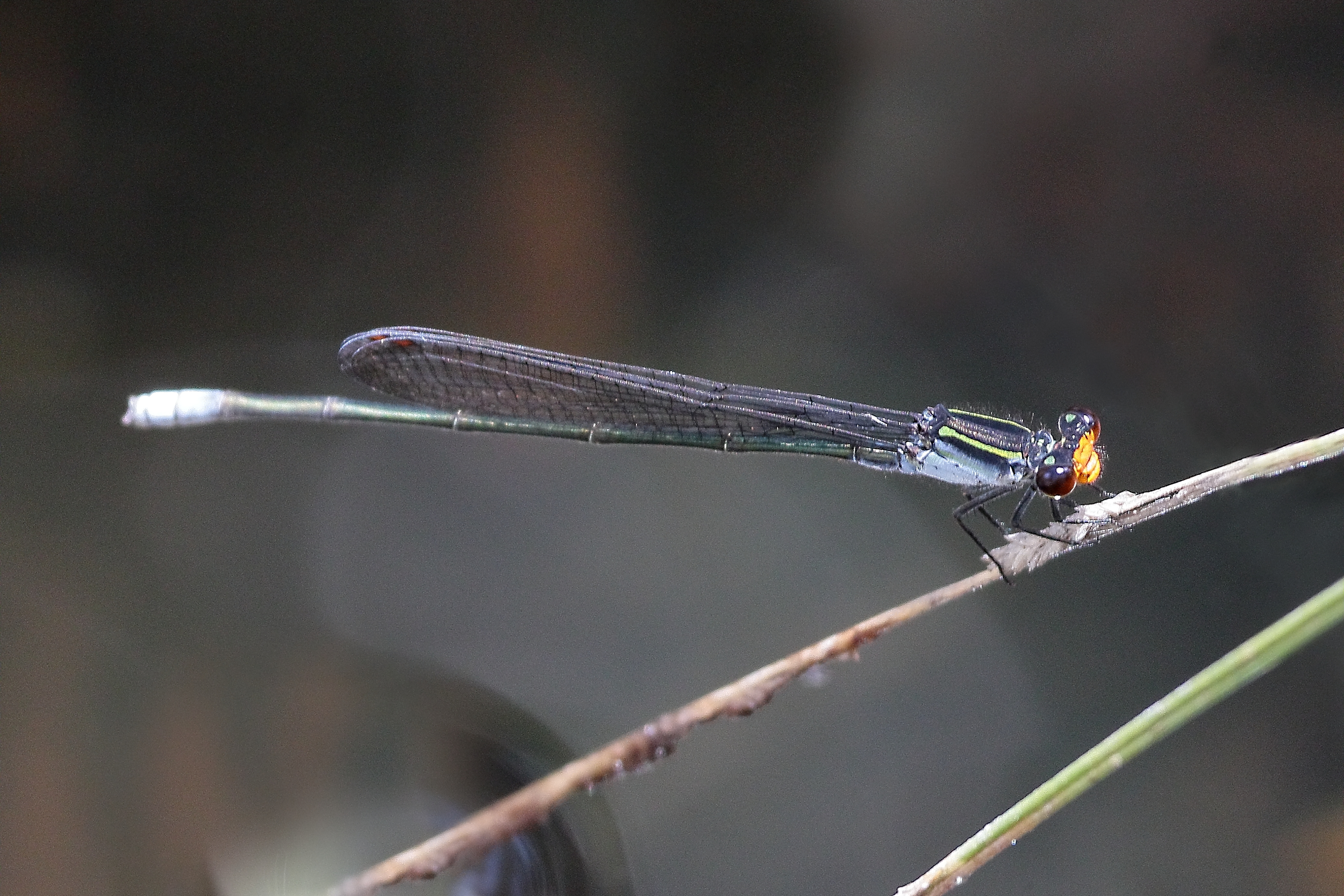
- Male
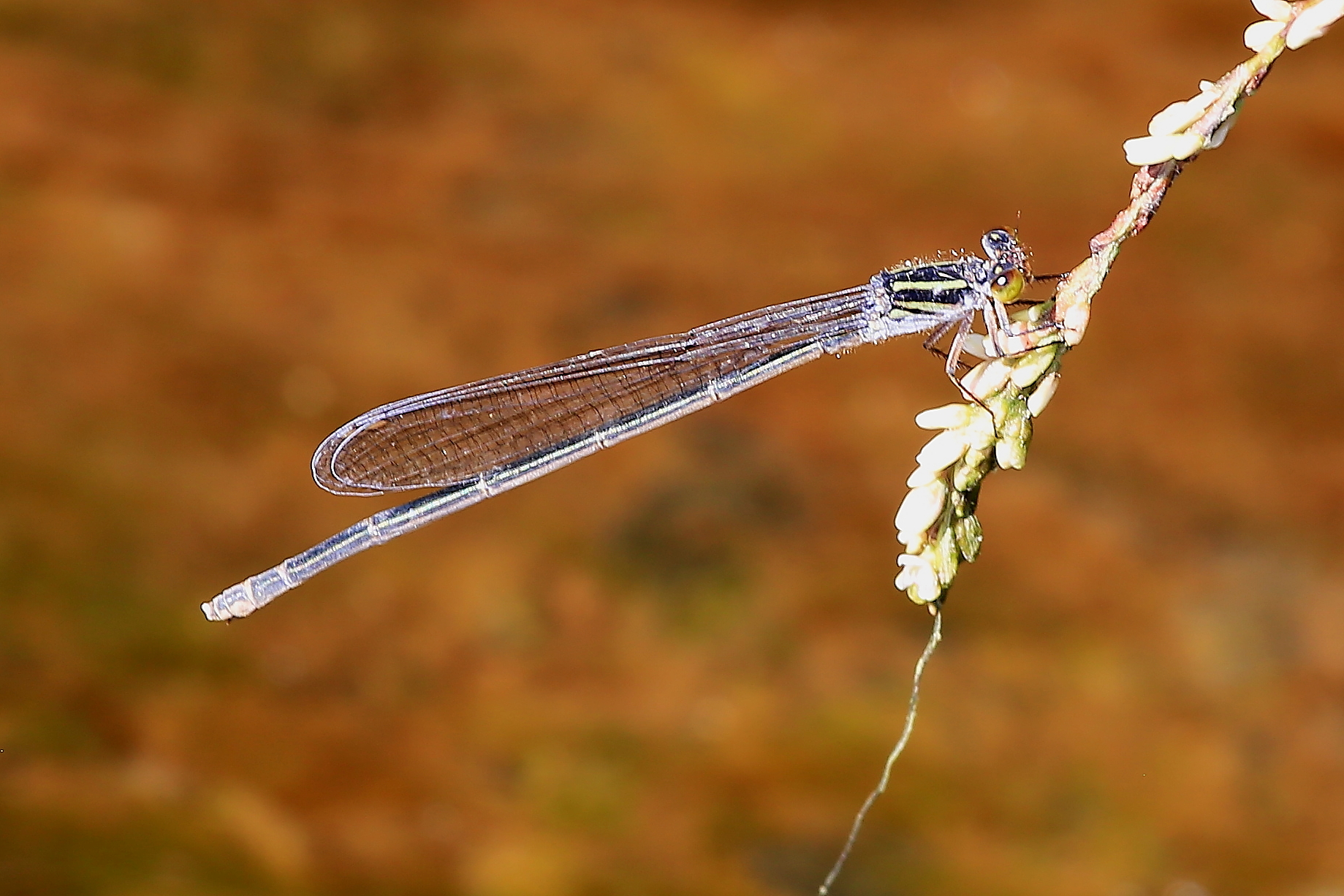
- Female

Conservation status
- Least Concern (IUCN 3.1)

Scientific classification
- Kingdom: Animalia
- Phylum: Arthropoda
- Clade: Pancrustacea
- Class: Insecta
- Order: Odonata
- Suborder: Zygoptera
- Family: Coenagrionidae
- Genus: Pseudagrion
- Species: P. ignifer

Binomial name
- Pseudagrion ignifer Tillyard, 1906

= Pseudagrion ignifer =

Flame-headed riverdamsel

Species of damselfly

Pseudagrion ignifer is a species of damselfly in the family Coenagrionidae, commonly known as a flame-headed riverdamsel. It is a medium-sized damselfly with an orange face and pruinose sides to its body and the start of its tail. It is found in eastern Australia, where it inhabits streams.

== Etymology ==
The genus name Pseudagrion is derived from the Greek ψευδής (pseudēs, "false" or "not true"), combined with Agrion, a genus name derived from the Greek ἄγριος (agrios, "wild"). Agrion was the name given in 1775 by Johan Christian Fabricius for all damselflies.

The species name ignifer is Latin for "fire-bearing", referring to the bright rust-coloured markings on the face.

== Gallery ==
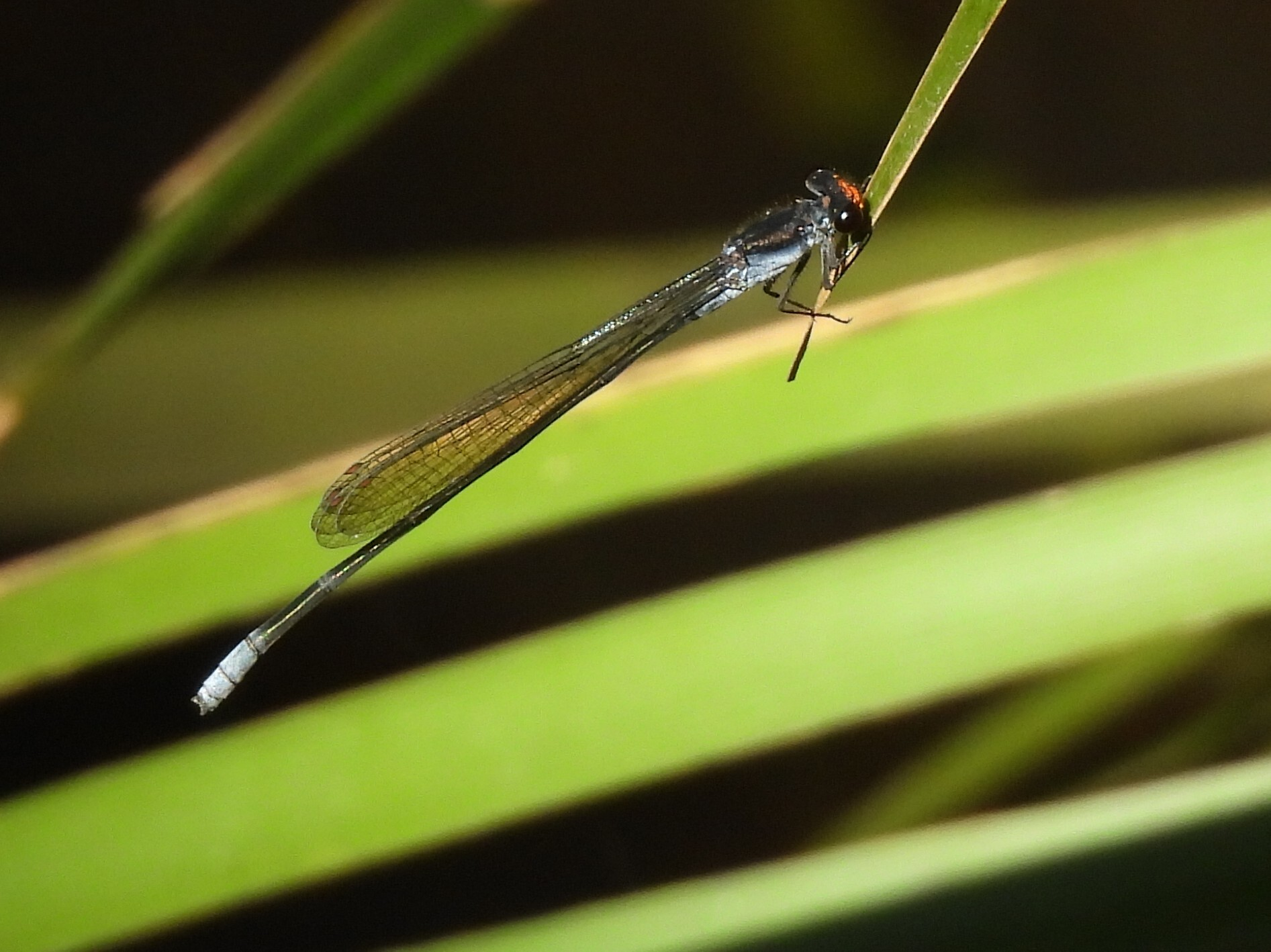
Male

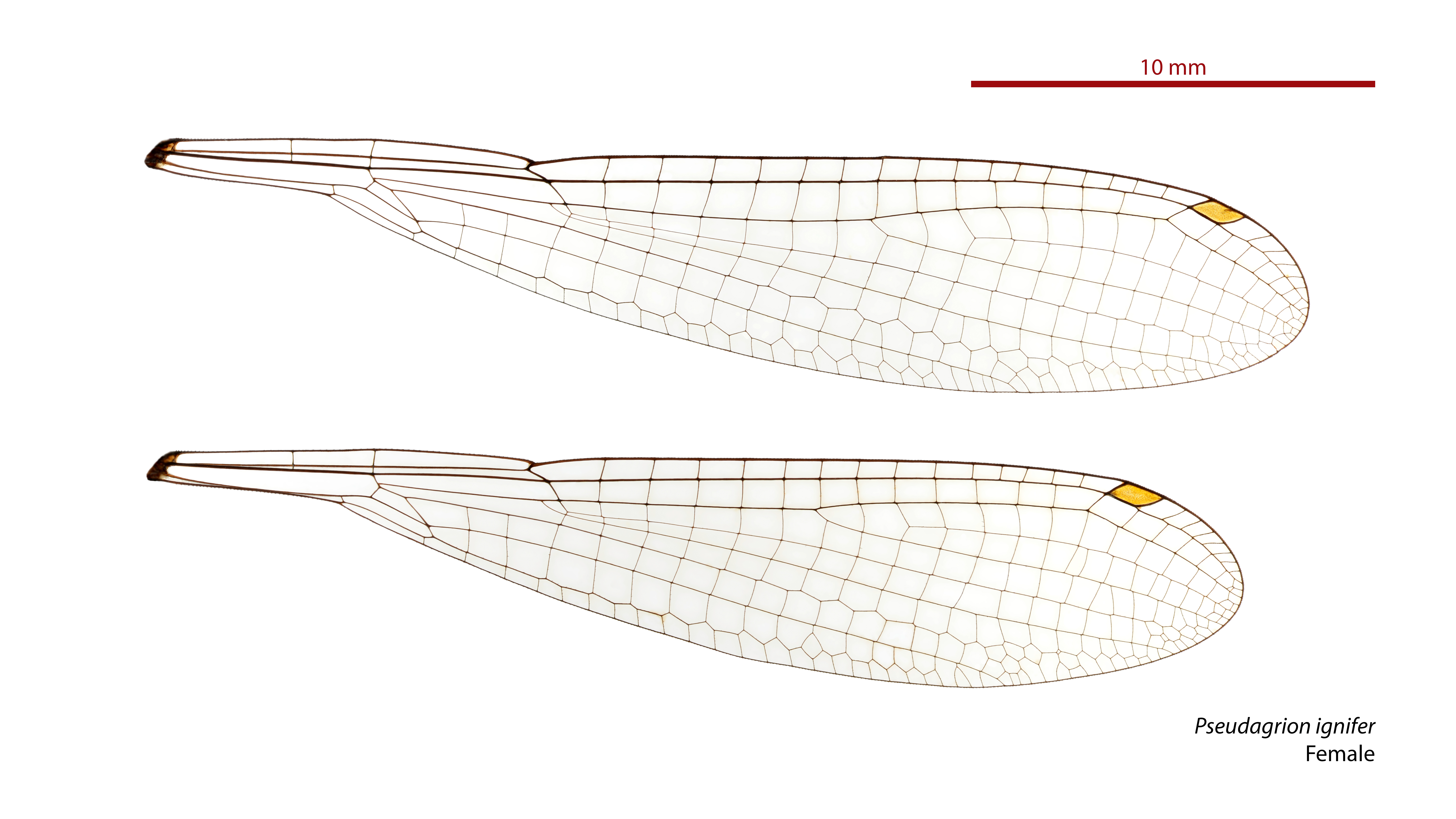
Female wings

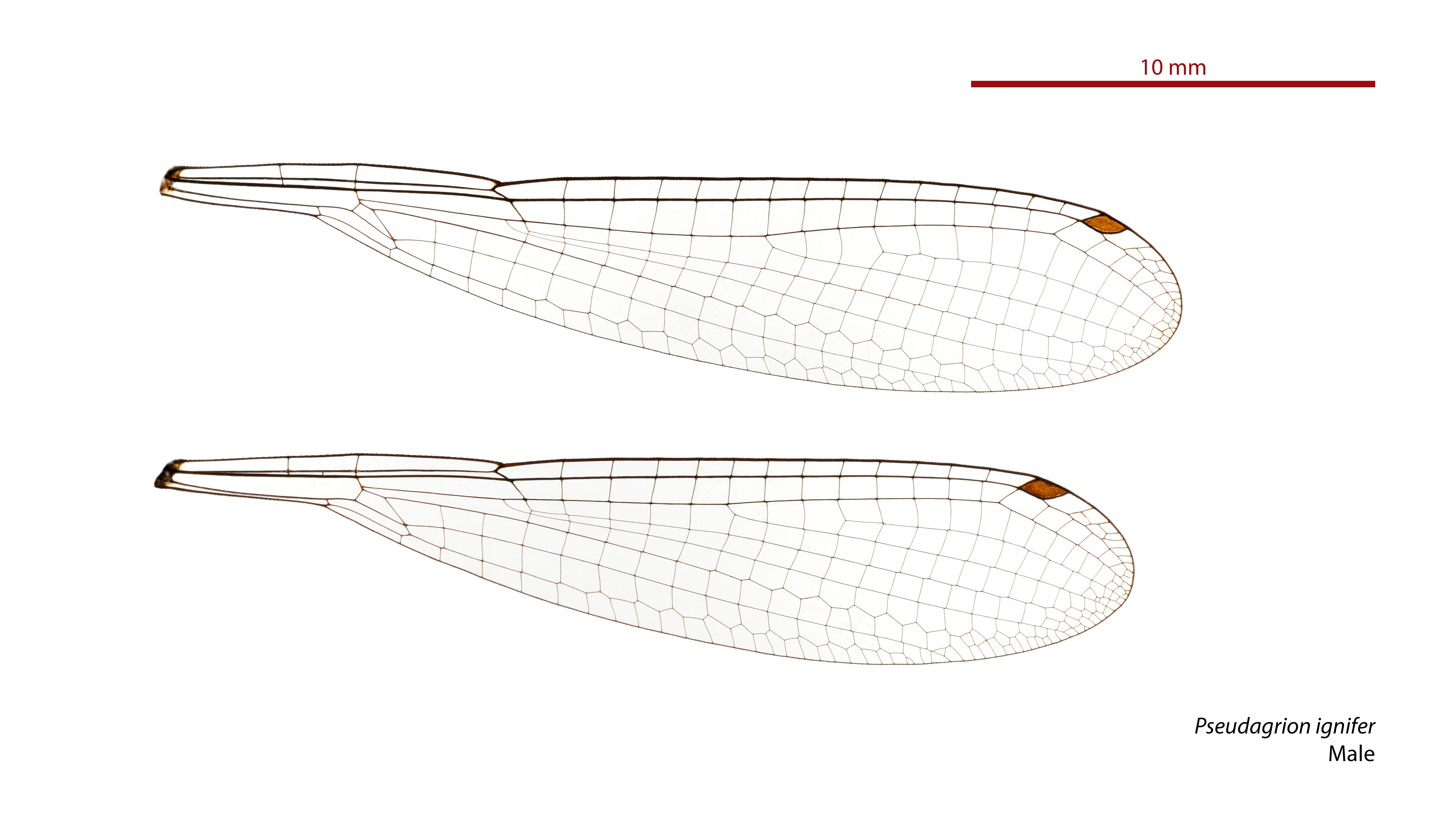
Male wings

== See also ==
- List of Odonata species of Australia
