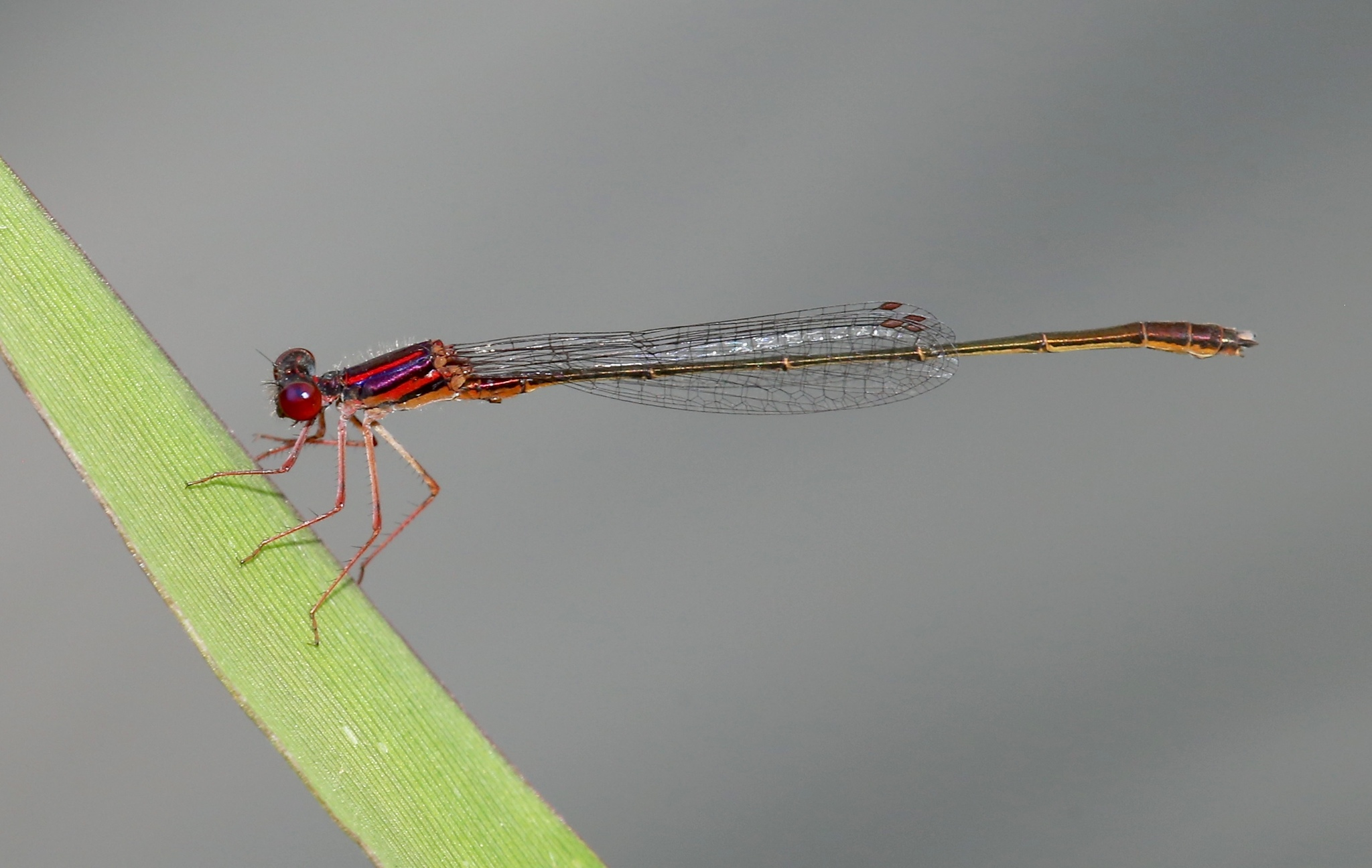

Conservation status
- Least Concern (IUCN 3.1)

Scientific classification
- Kingdom: Animalia
- Phylum: Arthropoda
- Class: Insecta
- Order: Odonata
- Suborder: Zygoptera
- Family: Coenagrionidae
- Genus: Enallagma
- Species: E. dubium

Binomial name
- Enallagma dubium Root, 1924

= Enallagma dubium =

Species of damselfly

Enallagma dubium is a damselfly in the Coenagrionidae family. It occurs across twelve U.S. states (Alabama, Delaware, Florida, Georgia, Louisiana, Maryland, Mississippi, North Carolina, Oklahoma, South Carolina, Texas, Virginia), and is classified as Least Concern on the IUCN Red List. E. dubium was first described in 1924 by Francis Metcalf Root.
