= Tuberculobasis tirio =

Scientific classification
- Domain: Eukaryota
- Kingdom: Animalia
- Phylum: Arthropoda
- Class: Insecta
- Order: Odonata
- Suborder: Zygoptera
- Family: Coenagrionidae
- Genus: Tuberculobasis
- Species: T. tirio

Binomial name
- Tuberculobasis tirio Machado, 2009

Species of damselfly

Tuberculobasis tirio is a species of damselfly in the family Coenagrionidae first identified in Pará, Brazil.
