= Denticulobasis garrisoni =

Scientific classification
- Domain: Eukaryota
- Kingdom: Animalia
- Phylum: Arthropoda
- Class: Insecta
- Order: Odonata
- Suborder: Zygoptera
- Family: Coenagrionidae
- Genus: Denticulobasis
- Species: D. garrisoni

Binomial name
- Denticulobasis garrisoni Machado, 2009

Species of insect

Denticulobasis garrisoni is a species of damselfly in the family Coenagrionidae first identified in Rondônia, Brazil.
