= Tuberculobasis guarani =

Scientific classification
- Kingdom: Animalia
- Phylum: Arthropoda
- Class: Insecta
- Order: Odonata
- Suborder: Zygoptera
- Family: Coenagrionidae
- Genus: Tuberculobasis
- Species: T. guarani

Binomial name
- Tuberculobasis guarani Machado, 2009

Species of damselfly

Tuberculobasis guarani is a species of damselfly in the family Coenagrionidae first identified in São Paulo, Brazil.
