= Diceratobasis melanogaster =

Conservation status
- Data Deficient (IUCN 3.1)

Scientific classification
- Kingdom: Animalia
- Phylum: Arthropoda
- Class: Insecta
- Order: Odonata
- Suborder: Zygoptera
- Family: Coenagrionidae
- Genus: Diceratobasis
- Species: D. melanogaster

Binomial name
- Diceratobasis melanogaster Garrison, 1986

Species of damselfly

Diceratobasis melanogaster is a species of damselfly in the family Coenagrionidae. It is endemic to the island of Hispaniola (in the Dominican Republic and Haiti). Its natural habitat is subtropical or tropical moist lowland forests. It is threatened by habitat loss.
