= Denticulobasis ariken =

Scientific classification
- Kingdom: Animalia
- Phylum: Arthropoda
- Class: Insecta
- Order: Odonata
- Suborder: Zygoptera
- Family: Coenagrionidae
- Genus: Denticulobasis
- Species: D. ariken

Binomial name
- Denticulobasis ariken Machado, 2009

Species of damselfly

Denticulobasis ariken is a species of damselfly in the family Coenagrionidae. It was first identified in Rondônia, Brazil.
