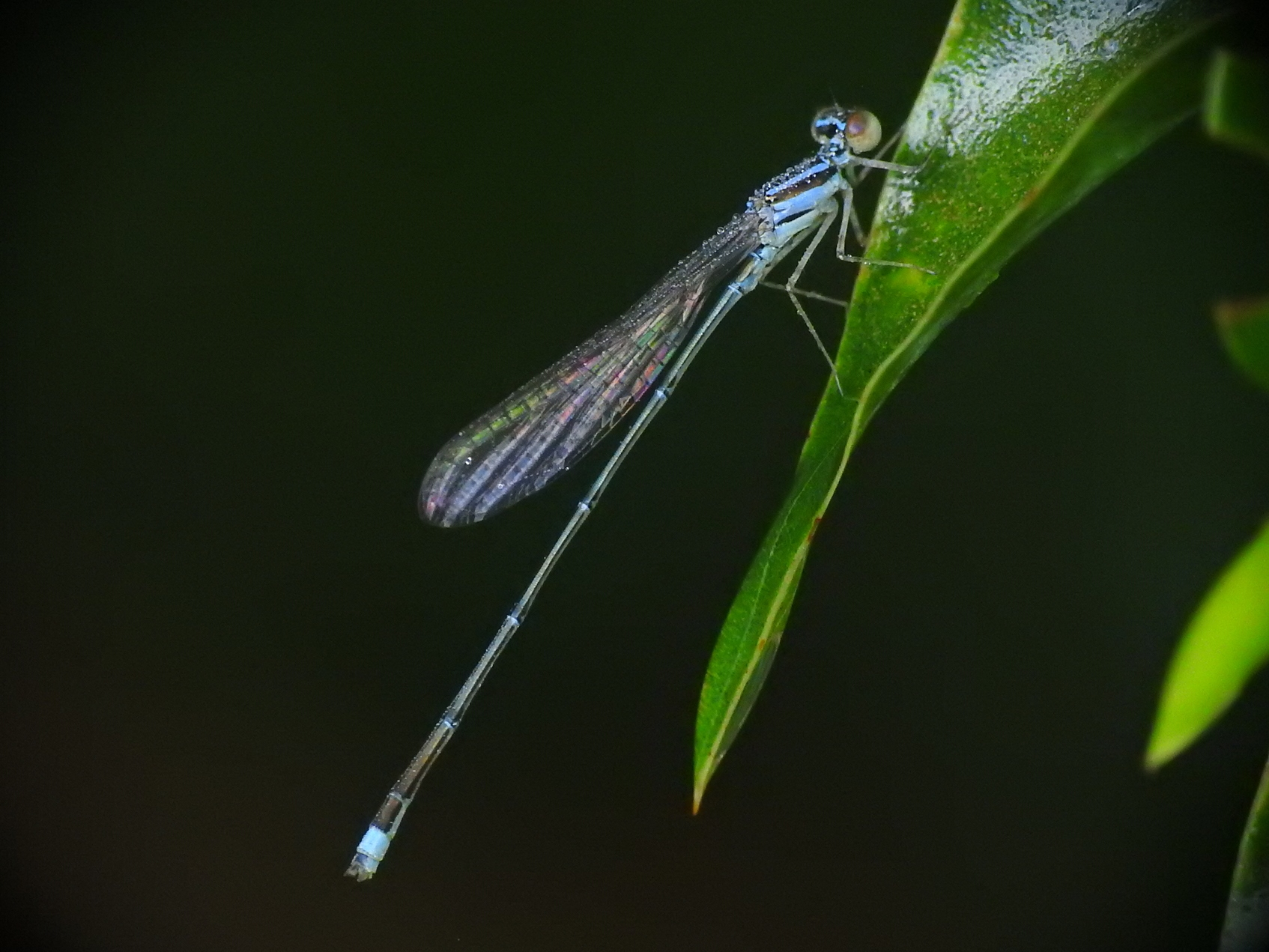
- Blue morph
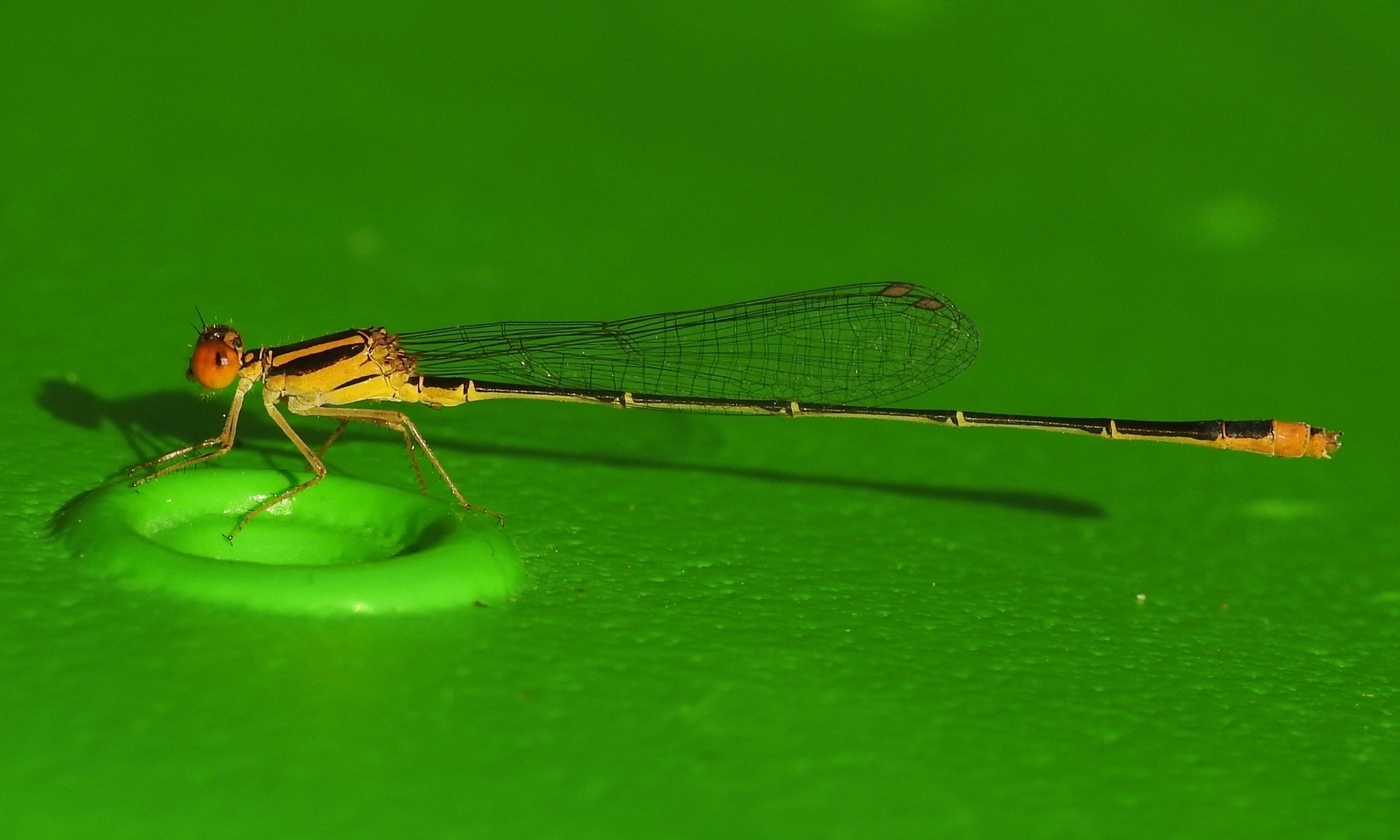
- Orange Morph

Conservation status
- Least Concern (IUCN 3.1)

Scientific classification
- Kingdom: Animalia
- Phylum: Arthropoda
- Class: Insecta
- Order: Odonata
- Suborder: Zygoptera
- Family: Coenagrionidae
- Genus: Enallagma
- Species: E. pollutum

Binomial name
- Enallagma pollutum (Hagen, 1861)

= Enallagma pollutum =

Species of damselfly

Enallagma pollutum, the Florida bluet, is a species of narrow-winged damselfly in the family Coenagrionidae. It is endemic to the eastern United States.

The IUCN conservation status of Enallagma pollutum is "least concern", with no immediate threat to the species' survival. The population is stable.
