= Tuberculobasis karitiana =

Scientific classification
- Kingdom: Animalia
- Phylum: Arthropoda
- Clade: Pancrustacea
- Class: Insecta
- Order: Odonata
- Suborder: Zygoptera
- Family: Coenagrionidae
- Genus: Tuberculobasis
- Species: T. karitiana

Binomial name
- Tuberculobasis karitiana Machado, 2009

Species of damselfly

Tuberculobasis karitiana is a species of damselfly in the family Coenagrionidae first identified in Rondônia, Brazil.
