= Diceratobasis macrogaster =

Conservation status
- Data Deficient (IUCN 3.1)

Scientific classification
- Kingdom: Animalia
- Phylum: Arthropoda
- Clade: Pancrustacea
- Class: Insecta
- Order: Odonata
- Suborder: Zygoptera
- Family: Coenagrionidae
- Genus: Diceratobasis
- Species: D. macrogaster

Binomial name
- Diceratobasis macrogaster (Selys in Sagra, 1857)

Species of damselfly

Diceratobasis macrogaster is a species of damselfly in the family Coenagrionidae endemic to Jamaica. Its natural habitat is subtropical or tropical moist lowland forests. It is threatened by habitat loss.

Unlike most damselflies, the larvae of D. macrogaster live in pools which form in the leaves of bromeliads.
