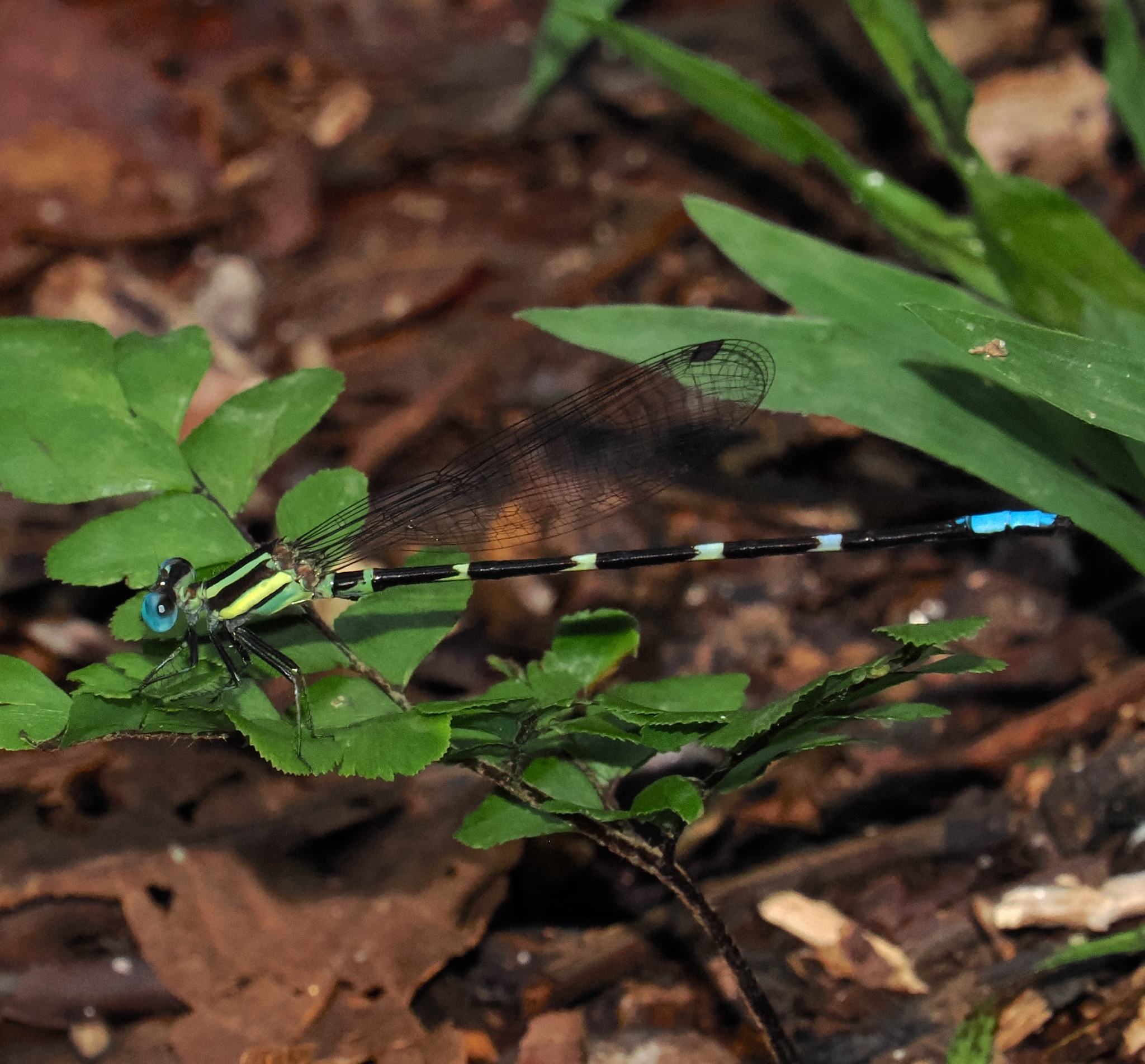

Scientific classification
- Kingdom: Animalia
- Phylum: Arthropoda
- Class: Insecta
- Order: Odonata
- Suborder: Zygoptera
- Family: Coenagrionidae
- Genus: Leptagrion
- Species: L. macrurum

Binomial name
- Leptagrion macrurum Selys, 1876

Synonyms
- Agrion macrurum Burmeister, 1839; Leptagrion auriceps St. Quentin, 1960; Argiagrion leoninum Selys, 1876

= Leptagrion macrurum =

Species of damselfly

Leptagrion macrurum is a species of damselfly in the family Coenagrionidae.
