= Pantomatrium =

Coordinates: 35°23′04″N 24°35′42″E

Pantomatrium or Pantomatrion (Ancient Greek: Παντομάτριον) was a town on the north coast of ancient Crete, placed by Ptolemy between Rhithymna and the Dium Promontorium, but by Pliny more to the west, between Aptera and Amphimalla. Its name was changed to Agrion in late antiquity. Under the name of Agrion, or Arion, it was a Roman Catholic bishopric.

Its site is located near Stavromenos.
