= List of Odonata species of South Africa =

The common English names are those used by Tarboton (2015) and Tarboton and Tarboton (2015). Alternative names used by Tarboton and Tarboton (2002), Tarboton and Tarboton (2005), Samways (2008), and Dijkstra and Clausnitzer (2014) are given in brackets.

== Zygoptera (damselflies) ==
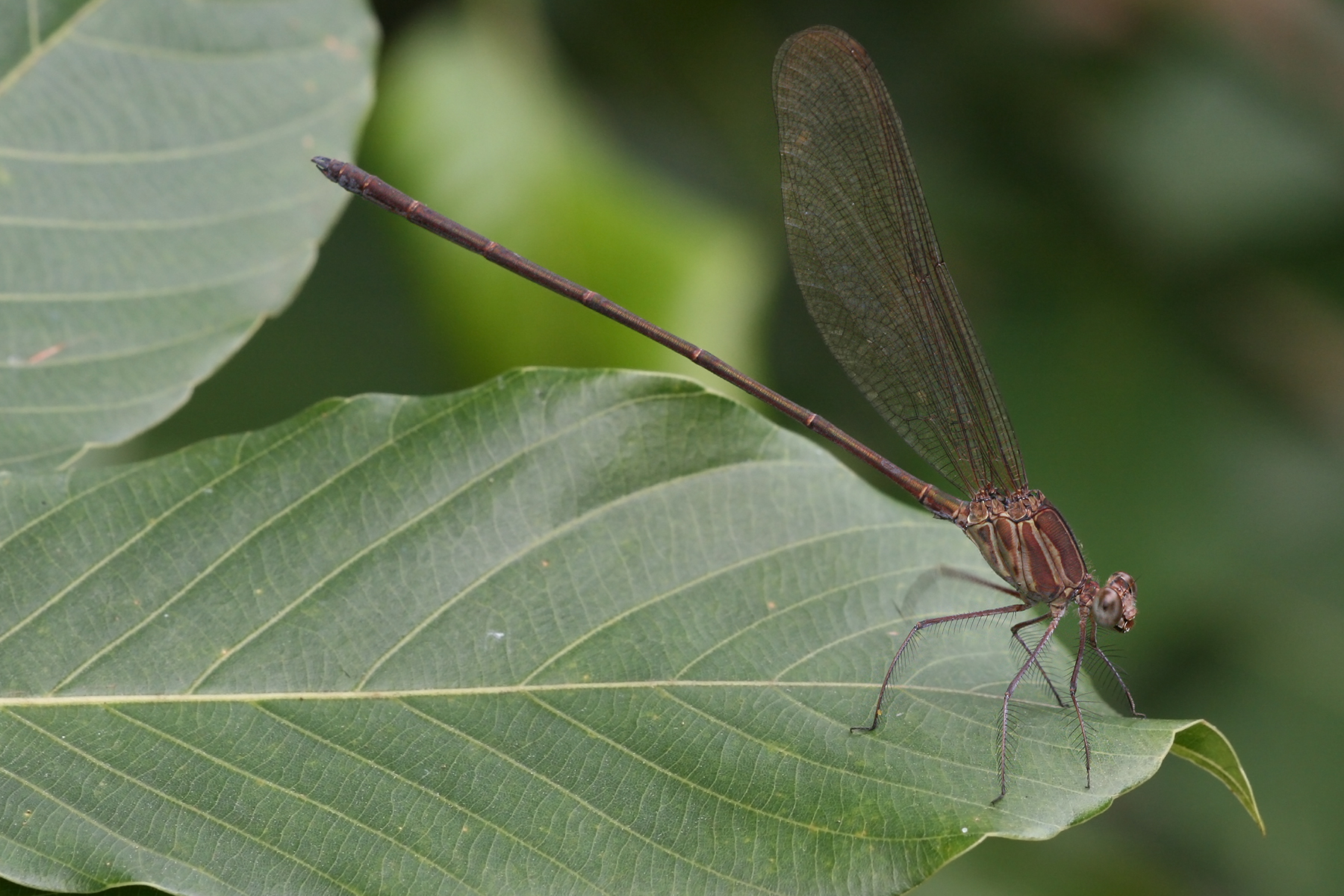
Phaon iridipennis

=== Calopterygidae ===
- Phaon
  - Phaon iridipennis, glistening demoiselle

=== Chlorocyphidae ===
- Chlorocypha
  - Chlorocypha consueta, ruby jewel
- Platycypha
  - Platycypha caligata, dancing jewel
  - Platycypha fitzsimonsi, boulder jewel (Fitzsimons's jewel)

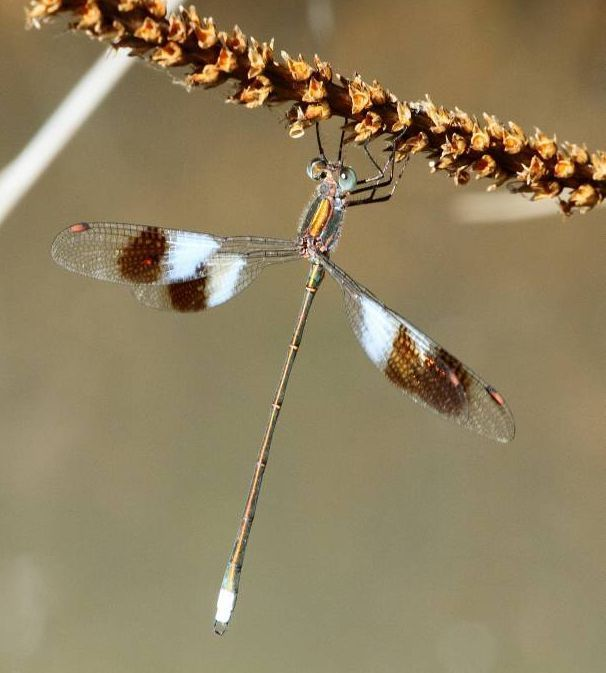
Chlorolestes fasciatus, a southern African endemic

=== Synlestidae ===
- Chlorolestes
  - Chlorolestes apricans, Amatola malachite (basking malachite)
  - Chlorolestes conspicuus, conspicuous malachite
  - Chlorolestes draconicus, Drakensberg malachite
  - Chlorolestes elegans, elegant malachite
  - Chlorolestes fasciatus, mountain malachite
  - Chlorolestes nylephtha, queen malachite
  - Chlorolestes peringueyi, rock malachite (marbled malachite)
  - Chlorolestes tessellatus, forest malachite
  - Chlorolestes umbratus, white malachite

=== Lestidae ===
- Lestes
  - Lestes dissimulans, cryptic spreadwing
  - Lestes ictericus, tawny spreadwing
  - Lestes pallidus, pallid spreadwing
  - Lestes plagiatus, highland spreadwing (common spreadwing)
  - Lestes tridens, spotted spreadwing
  - Lestes uncifer, sickle spreadwing
  - Lestes virgatus, smoky spreadwing

=== Platycnemididae ===
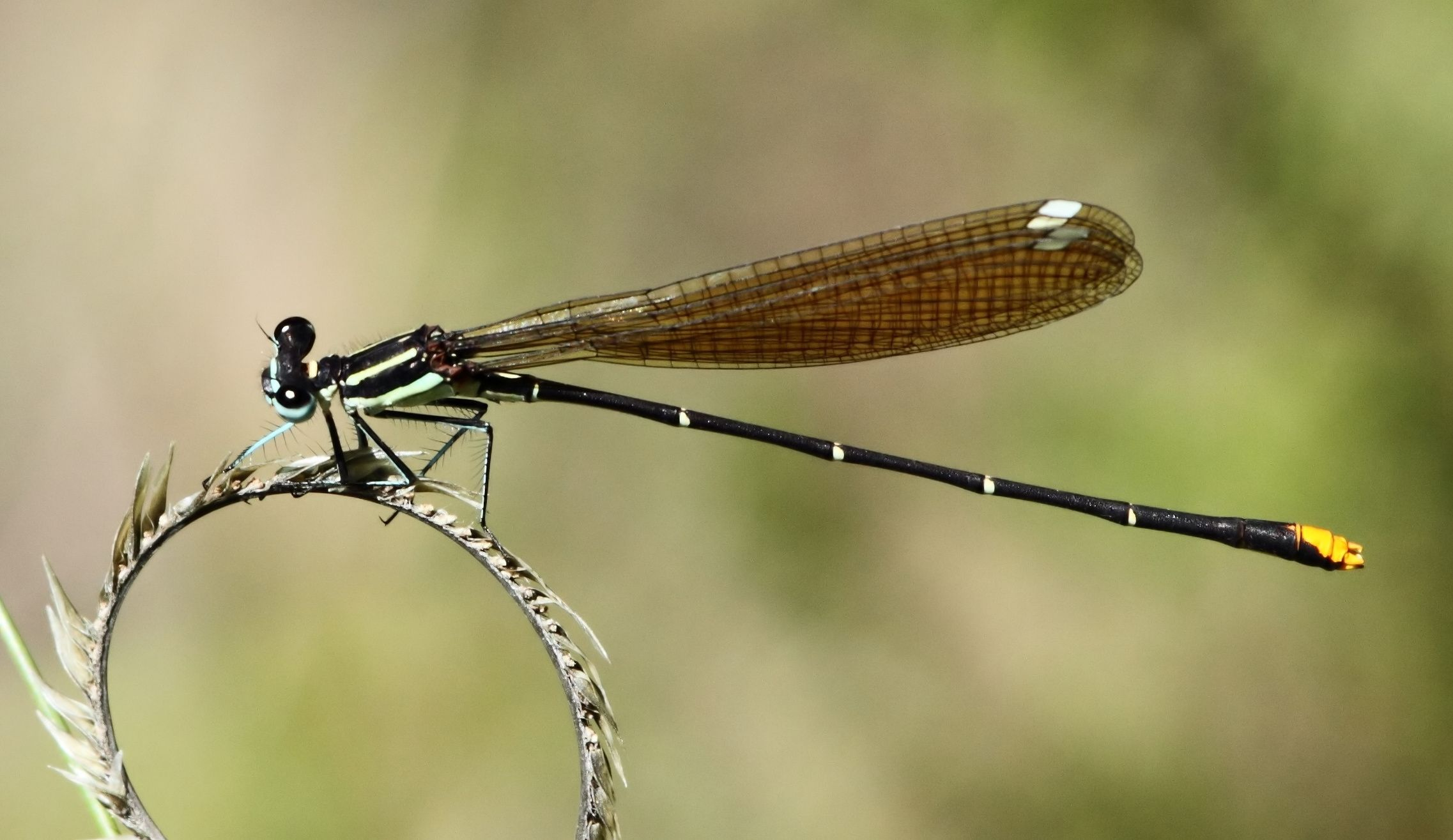
Allocnemis leucosticta, a southern African endemic

- Allocnemis
  - Allocnemis leucosticta, goldtail
- Elattoneura
  - Elattoneura frenulata, sooty threadtail
  - Elattoneura glauca, common threadtail
- Mesocnemis
  - Mesocnemis singularis, savanna riverjack (riverjack, common riverjack)
- Metacnemis
  - Metacnemis valida, blue riverjack (Kubusi stream-damsel, Kubusi streamjack)
- Spesbona
  - Spesbona angusta, spesbona (Ceres stream-damsel, Ceres streamjack)

=== Coenagrionidae ===
- Aciagrion
  - Aciagrion dondoense, opal slim
  - Aciagrion gracile, graceful slim (Aciagrion pinheyi is treated as conspecific with A. gracile)

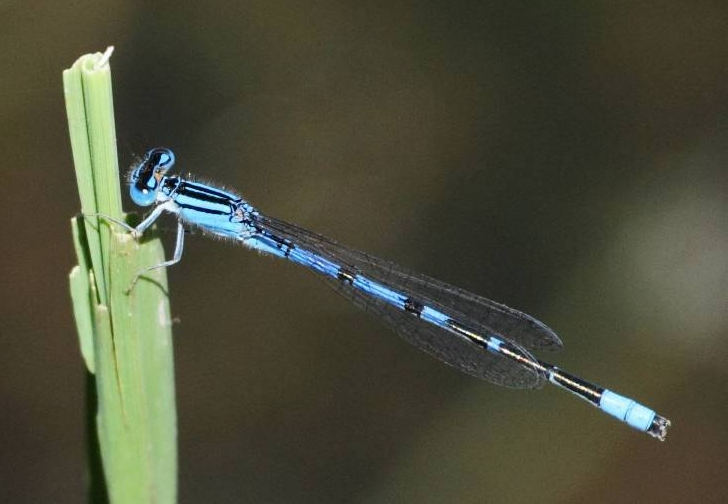
Africallagma sapphirinum, a southern African endemic

- Africallagma
  - Africallagma fractum, slender bluet
  - Africallagma glaucum, swamp bluet
  - Africallagma sapphirinum, sapphire bluet
  - Africallagma sinuatum, arid bluet
- Agriocnemis
  - Agriocnemis exilis, little whisp
  - Agriocnemis falcifera, white-masked whisp
  - Agriocnemis gratiosa, gracious whisp
  - Agriocnemis pinheyi, Pinhey's whisp
  - Agriocnemis ruberrima, orange whisp
- Azuragrion
  - Azuragrion nigridorsum, sailing bluet (black-tailed bluet)
- Ceriagrion
  - Ceriagrion glabrum, common citril
  - Ceriagrion suave, suave citril
- Ischnura
  - Ischnura senegalensis, tropical bluetail (African bluetail)
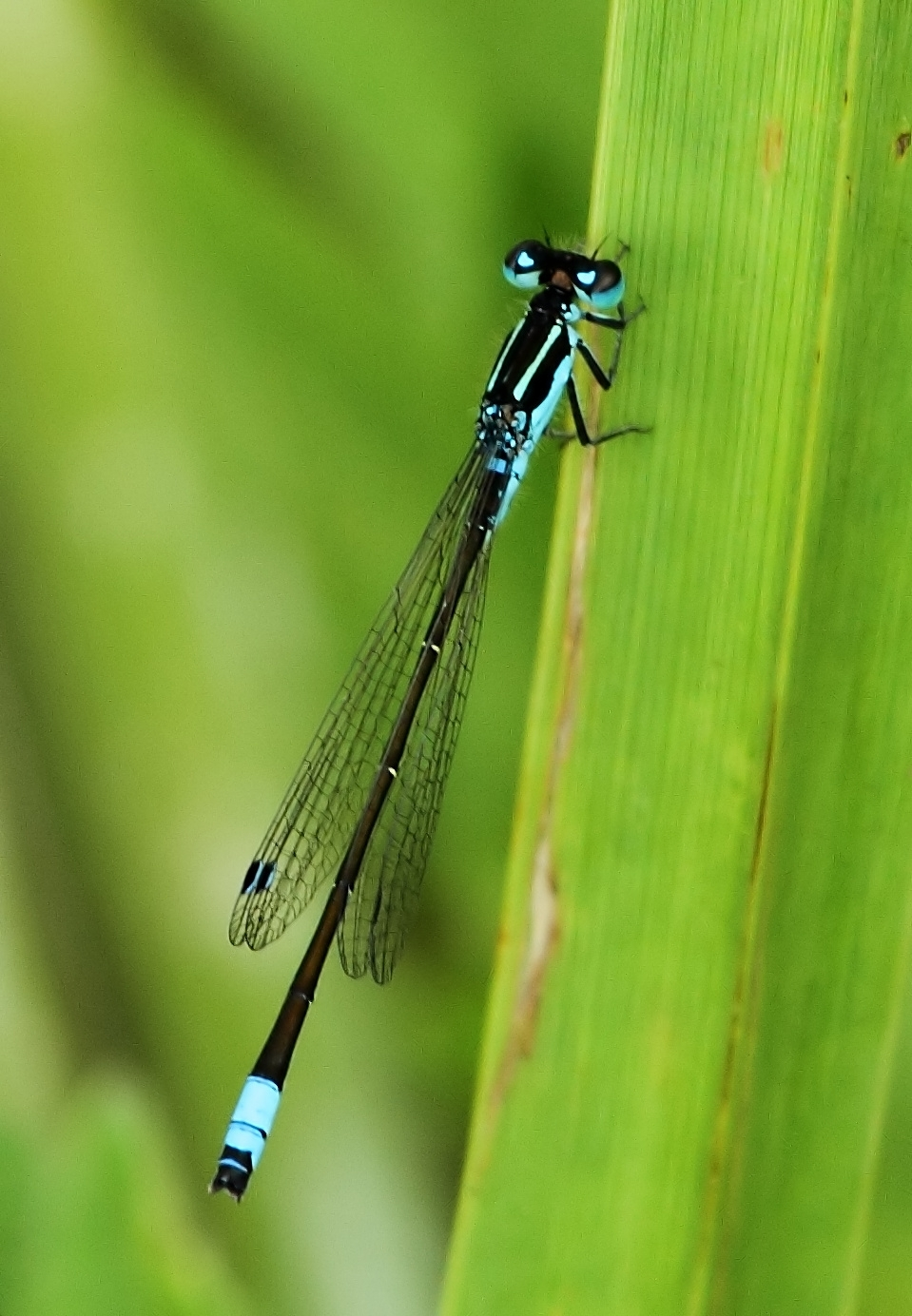
    Proischnura rotundipennis, a southern African endemic
- Proischnura
  - Proischnura polychromatica, Cape bluet
  - Proischnura rotundipennis, round-winged bluet
  - Proischnura subfurcata, fork-tailed bluet
- Pseudagrion
  - Pseudagrion acaciae, acacia sprite
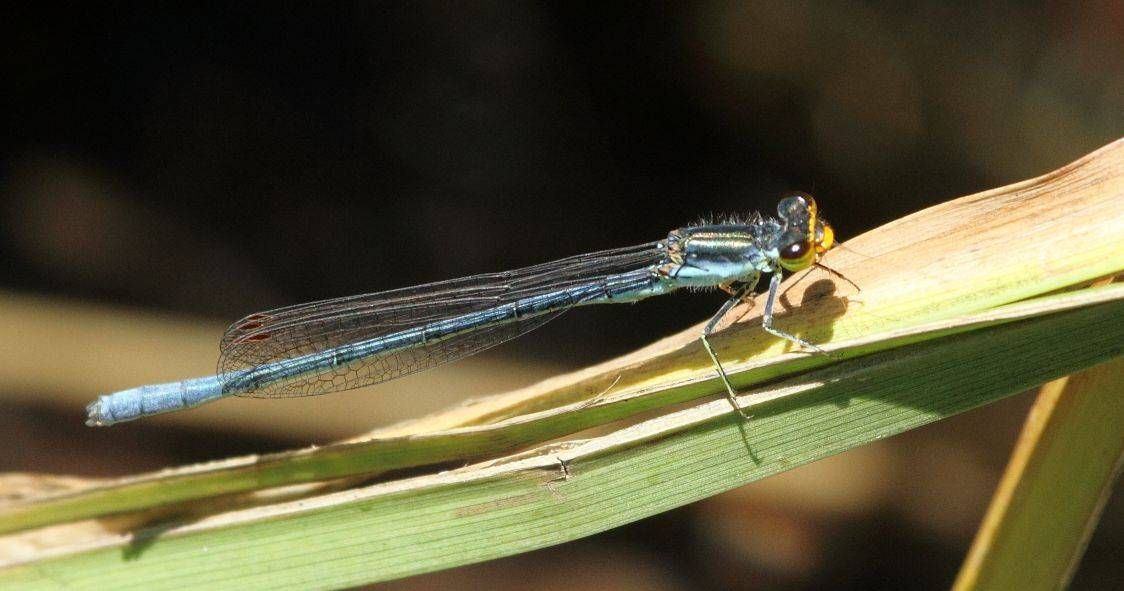
    Pseudagrion caffrum, a southern African endemic
  - Pseudagrion assegaii, assegai sprite
  - Pseudagrion caffrum, springwater sprite
  - Pseudagrion citricola, yellow-faced sprite
  - Pseudagrion coeleste, catshead sprite
  - Pseudagrion commoniae, black sprite
  - Pseudagrion draconis, mountain sprite
  - Pseudagrion furcigerum, palmiet sprite
  - Pseudagrion gamblesi, great sprite (Gamble's sprite)
  - Pseudagrion hageni, painted sprite (Hagen's sprite)
  - Pseudagrion hamoni, swarthy sprite (Hamon's sprite)
  - Pseudagrion inopinatum, Balinsky's sprite (Badplaas sprite)
  - Pseudagrion kersteni, powder-faced sprite (Kersten's sprite)
  - Pseudagrion makabusiense, makabusi sprite
  - Pseudagrion massaicum, Masai sprite
  - Pseudagrion newtoni, harlequin sprite (Newton's sprite)
  - Pseudagrion salisburyense, slate sprite (Salisbury sprite)
  - Pseudagrion sjoestedti, variable sprite (Sjostedt's sprite)
  - Pseudagrion spernatum, upland sprite (Natal sprite)
  - Pseudagrion sublacteum, cherry-eye sprite
  - Pseudagrion sudanicum, blue-sided sprite (Sudan sprite)
  - Pseudagrion vaalense, Vaal sprite

== Anisoptera (dragonflies) ==
=== Gomphidae ===
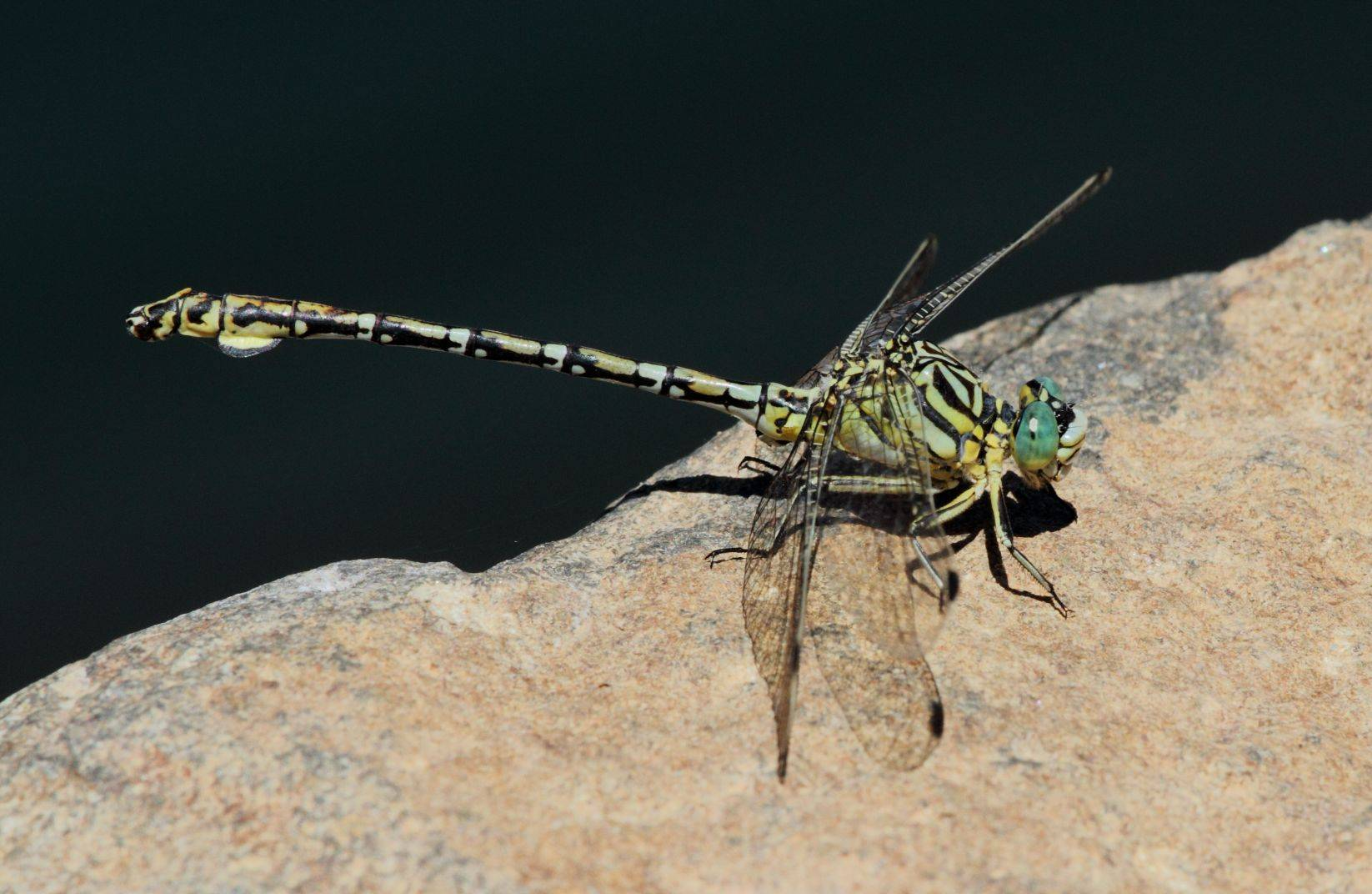
Ceratogomphus pictus

- Ceratogomphus
  - Ceratogomphus pictus, common thorntail
  - Ceratogomphus triceraticus, Cape thorntail
- Crenigomphus
  - Crenigomphus cornutus, horned talontail
  - Crenigomphus hartmanni, clubbed talontail (Hartmann's talontail)
- Gomphidia
  - Gomphidia quarrei, southern fingertail (Quarre's fingertail)
- Ictinogomphus
  - Ictinogomphus ferox, common tigertail
- Lestinogomphus
  - Lestinogomphus angustus, spined fairytail
- Microgomphus
  - Microgomphus nyassicus, eastern scissortail
- Neurogomphus
  - Neurogomphus zambeziensis, Zambezi siphontail
- Notogomphus
  - Notogomphus praetorius, yellowjack (yellowjack longleg)
- Onychogomphus
  - Onychogomphus supinus, lined claspertail (claspertail, gorge claspertail)
- Paragomphus
  - Paragomphus cognatus, rock hooktail (boulder hooktail)
  - Paragomphus elpidius, corkscrew hooktail
  - Paragomphus genei, common hooktail (green hooktail)
  - Paragomphus magnus, great hooktail
  - Paragomphus sabicus, flapper hooktail (Sabi hooktail)
- Phyllogomphus
  - Phyllogomphus brunneus, bold leaftail

=== Aeshnidae ===
- Anaciaeschna
  - Anaciaeschna triangulifera, evening hawker
- Anax
  - Anax ephippiger, vagrant emperor
  - Anax imperator, blue emperor
  - Anax speratus, orange emperor
  - Anax tristis, black emperor
- Gynacantha
  - Gynacantha manderica, little duskhawker (little dusk-hawker)
  - Gynacantha usambaricus, Usambara duskhawker (Usambara dusk-hawker)
  - Gynacantha villosa, hairy duskhawker (hairy cusk-hawker, brown duskhawker)
- Pinheyschna
  - Pinheyschna subpupillata, stream hawker
- Zosteraeschna
  - Zosteraeschna minuscula, friendly hawker
  - Zosteraeschna usambarica, forest hawker (Elliot's hawker)

=== Synthemistidae ===
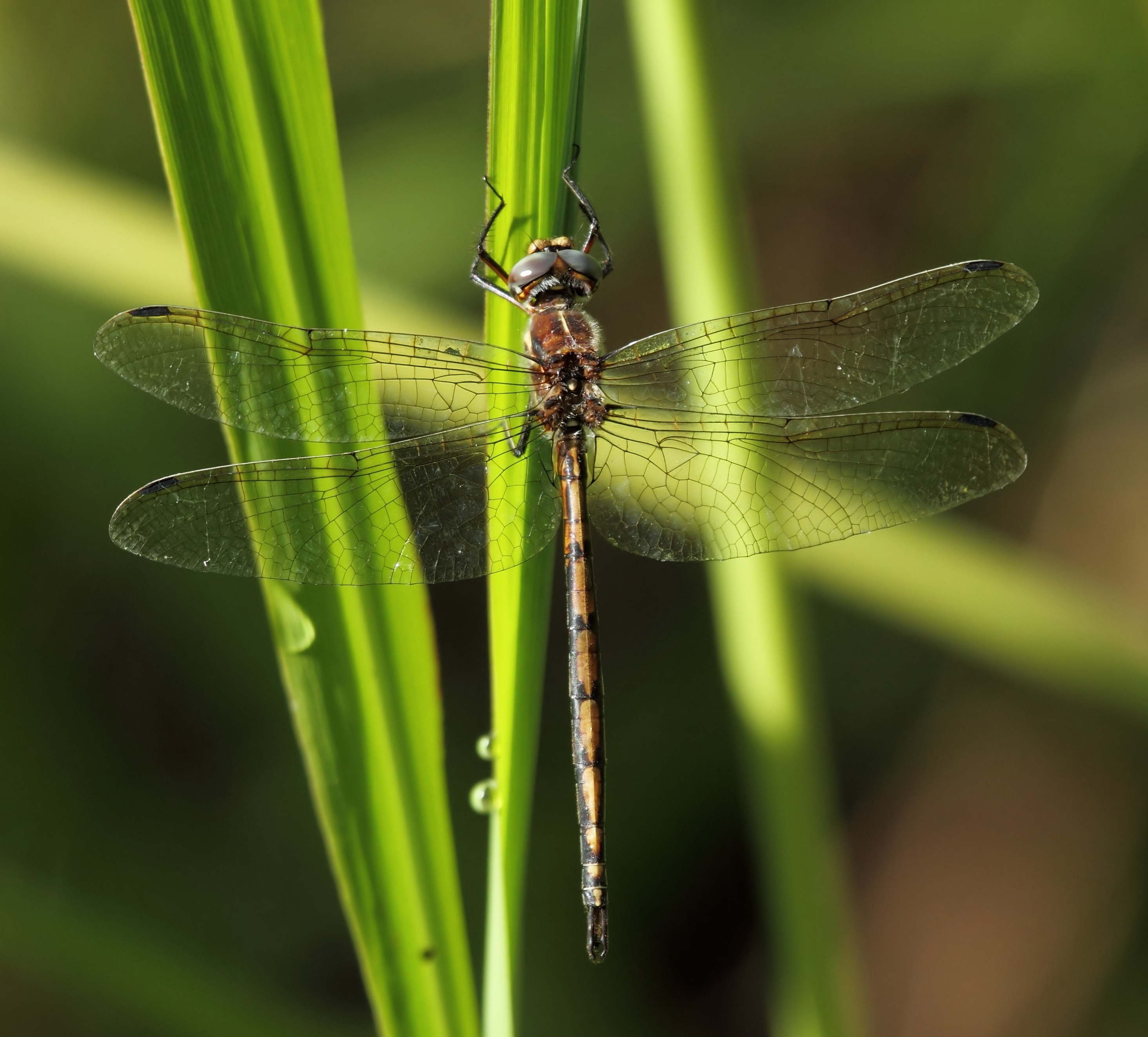
Syncordulia gracilis, a South African endemic

- Syncordulia
  - Syncordulia gracilis, yellow presba
  - Syncordulia legator, gilded presba
  - Syncordulia serendipator, rustic presba
  - Syncordulia venator, chestnut presba (mahogany presba)

=== Macromiidae ===
- Phyllomacromia
  - Phyllomacromia contumax, two-banded cruiser
  - Phyllomacromia monoceros, sable cruiser (black cruiser, unicorn cruiser)
  - Phyllomacromia picta, darting cruiser

=== Corduliidae ===
- Hemicordulia
  - Hemicordulia africana, African emerald

=== Libellulidae ===
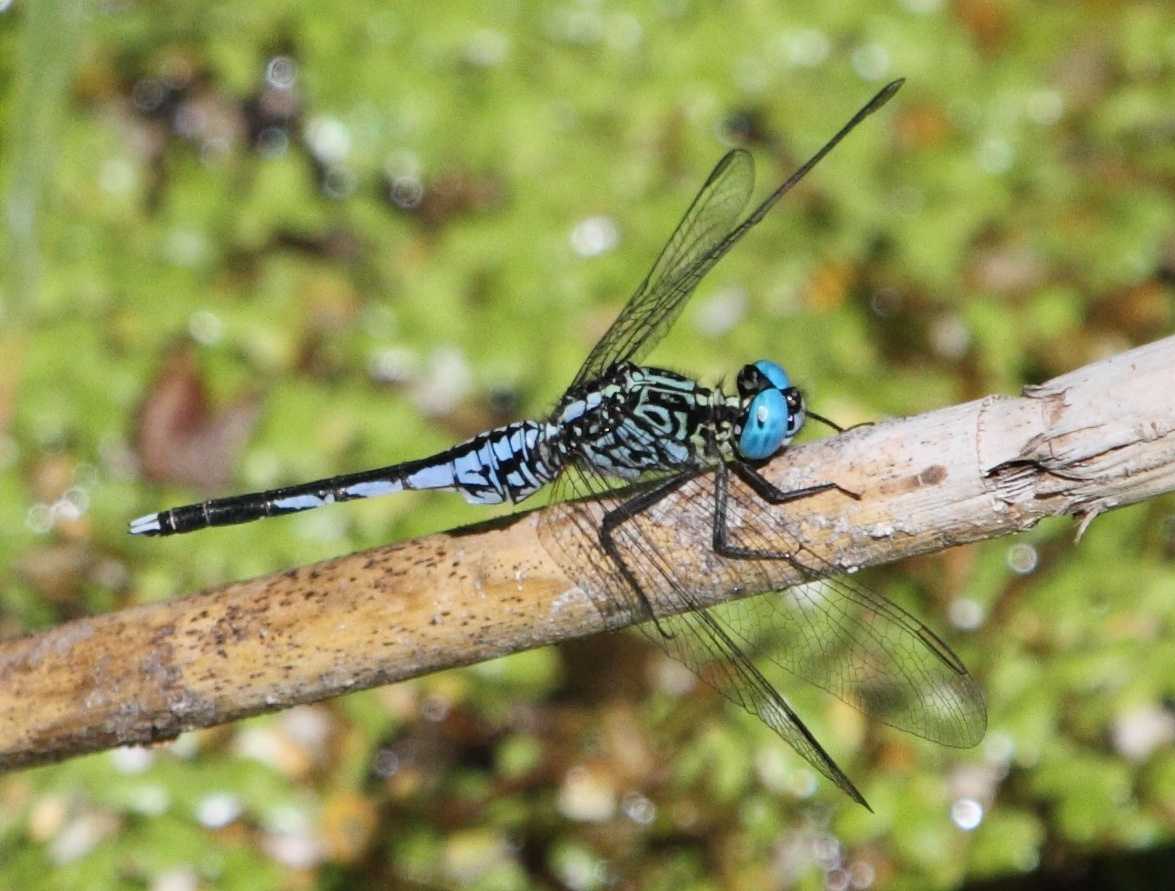
Acisoma variegatum

- Acisoma
  - Acisoma inflatum, stout pintail (grizzled pintail)
  - Acisoma variegatum, slender pintail (grizzled pintail)
- Aethriamanta
  - Aethriamanta rezia, pygmy basker
- Brachythemis
  - Brachythemis lacustris, red groundling
  - Brachythemis leucosticta, banded groundling
- Bradinopyga
  - Bradinopyga cornuta, horned rockdweller (don-dwala)
- Chalcostephia
  - Chalcostephia flavifrons, inspector
- Crocothemis
  - Crocothemis divisa, rock scarlet (divisa scarlet)
  - Crocothemis erythraea, broad scarlet
  - Crocothemis sanguinolenta, little scarlet

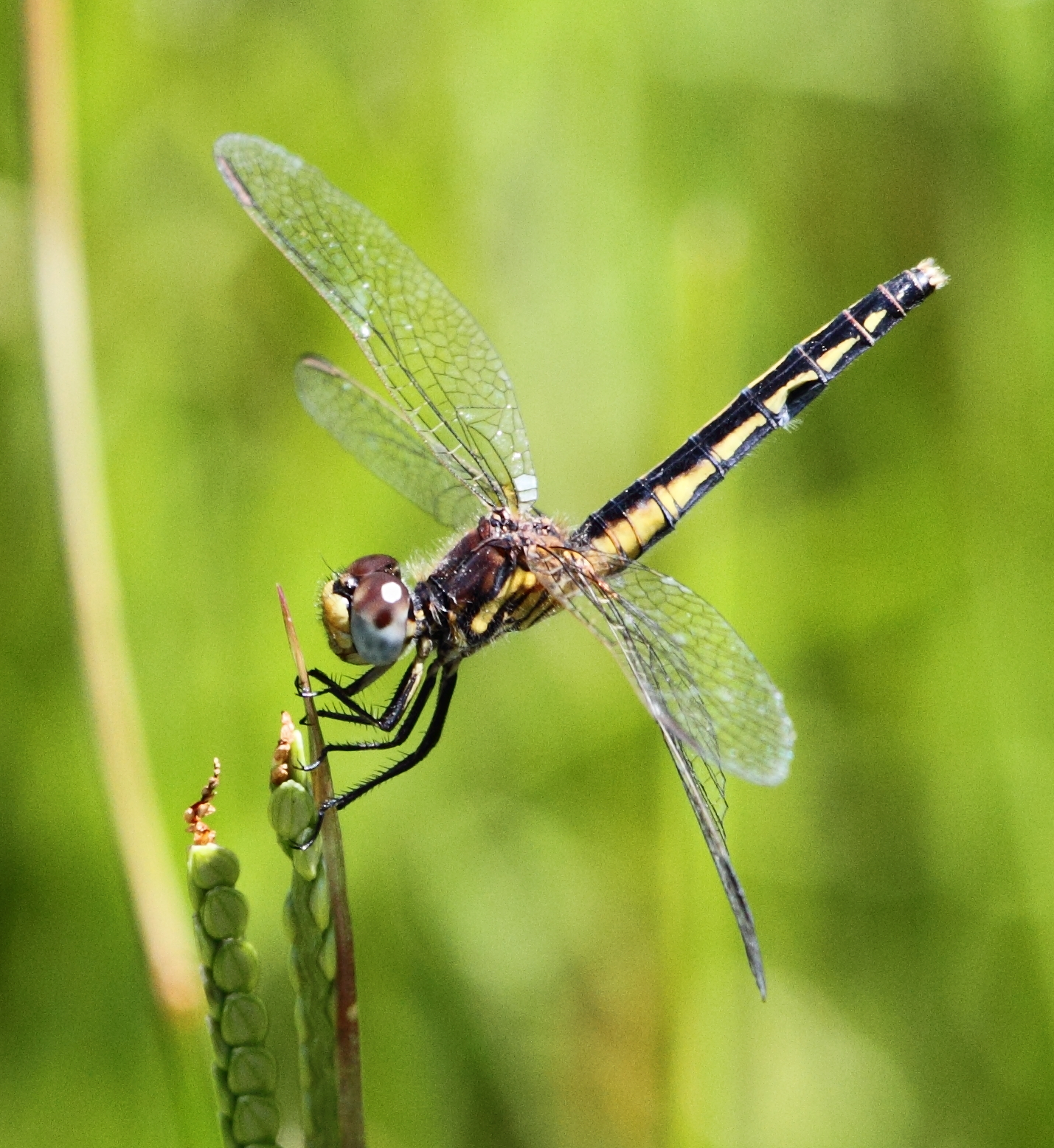
Diplacodes pumila

- Diplacodes
  - Diplacodes lefebvrii, black percher
  - Diplacodes luminans, barbet percher (barbet)
  - Diplacodes pumila, dwarf percher
- Hemistigma
  - Hemistigma albipuncta, African piedspot (pied-spot)
- Macrodiplax
  - Macrodiplax cora, coastal pennant (Cora's pennant)
- Nesciothemis
  - Nesciothemis farinosa, eastern blacktail (black-tailed skimmer)

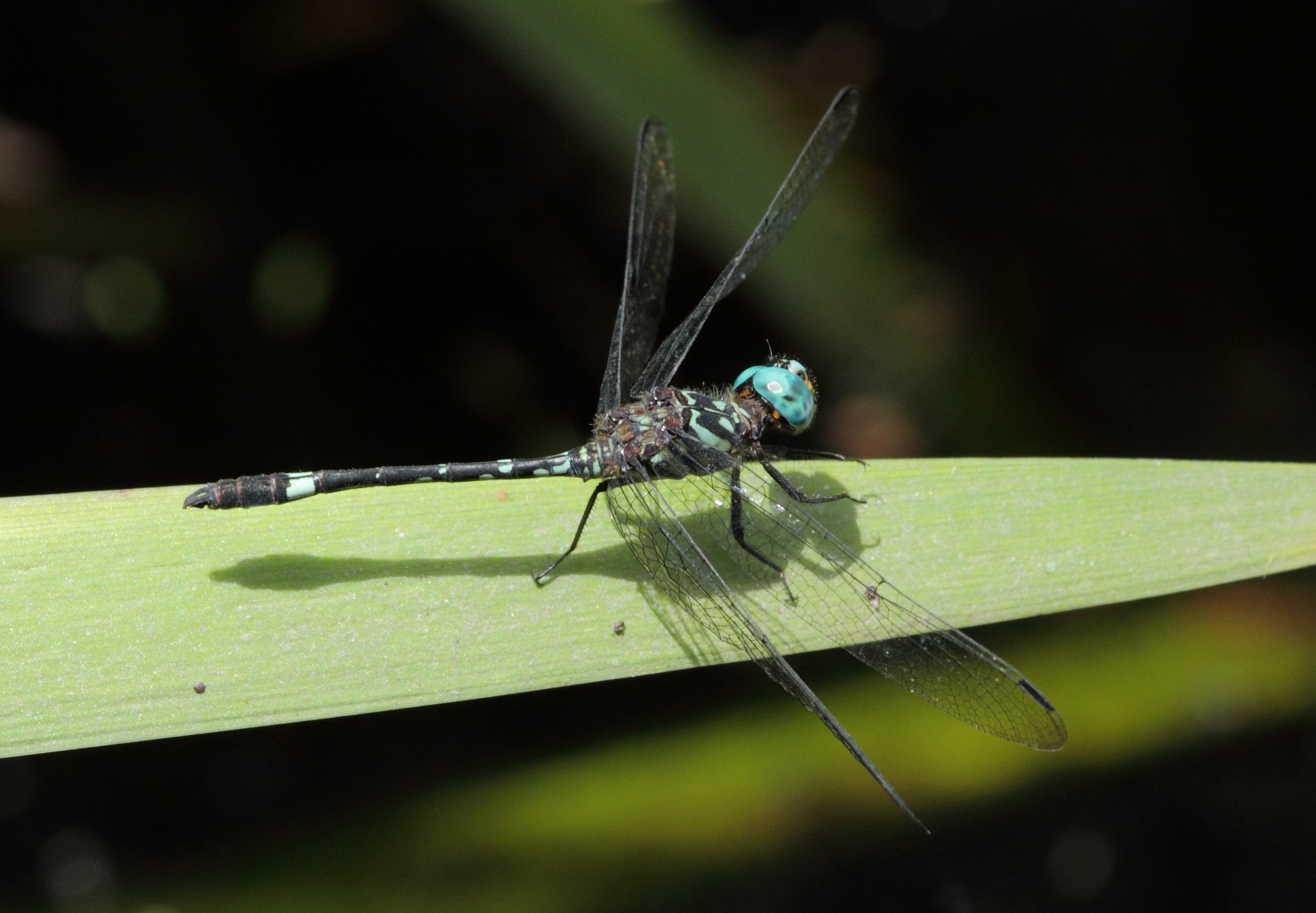
Notiothemis jonesi

- Notiothemis
  - Notiothemis jonesi, eastern forestwatcher (forest-watcher, Jones' forestwatcher)
- Olpogastra
  - Olpogastra lugubris, bottletail (slender bottletail)
- Orthetrum
  - Orthetrum abbotti, little skimmer (Abbott's skimmer)
  - Orthetrum brachiale, banded skimmer
  - Orthetrum caffrum, two-striped skimmer
  - Orthetrum chrysostigma, epaulet skimmer
  - Orthetrum guineense, Guinea skimmer
  - Orthetrum hintzi, dark-shouldered skimmer (Hintz's skimmer)
  - Orthetrum icteromelas, spectacled skimmer
  - Orthetrum julia, Julia skimmer
  - Orthetrum machadoi, highland skimmer (Machado's skimmer)
  - Orthetrum monardi, woodland skimmer
  - Orthetrum robustum, robust skimmer
  - Orthetrum rubens, elusive skimmer (ruby skimmer)
  - Orthetrum stemmale, bold skimmer (strong skimmer)
  - Orthetrum trinacria, long skimmer
- Palpopleura
  - Palpopleura deceptor, deceptive widow
  - Palpopleura jucunda, yellow-veined widow
  - Palpopleura lucia, Lucia widow
  - Palpopleura portia, portia widow
- Pantala
  - Pantala flavescens, pantala (wandering glider)
- Parazyxomma
  - Parazyxomma flavicans, banded duskdarter (banded dusk-darter)
- Rhyothemis
  - Rhyothemis semihyalina, phantom flutterer
- Sympetrum
  - Sympetrum fonscolombii, nomad
- Tetrathemis
  - Tetrathemis polleni, black-splashed elf (black-splash)
- Tholymis
  - Tholymis tillarga, twister
- Tramea
  - Tramea basilaris, keyhole glider
  - Tramea limbata, ferruginous glider (voyaging glider)

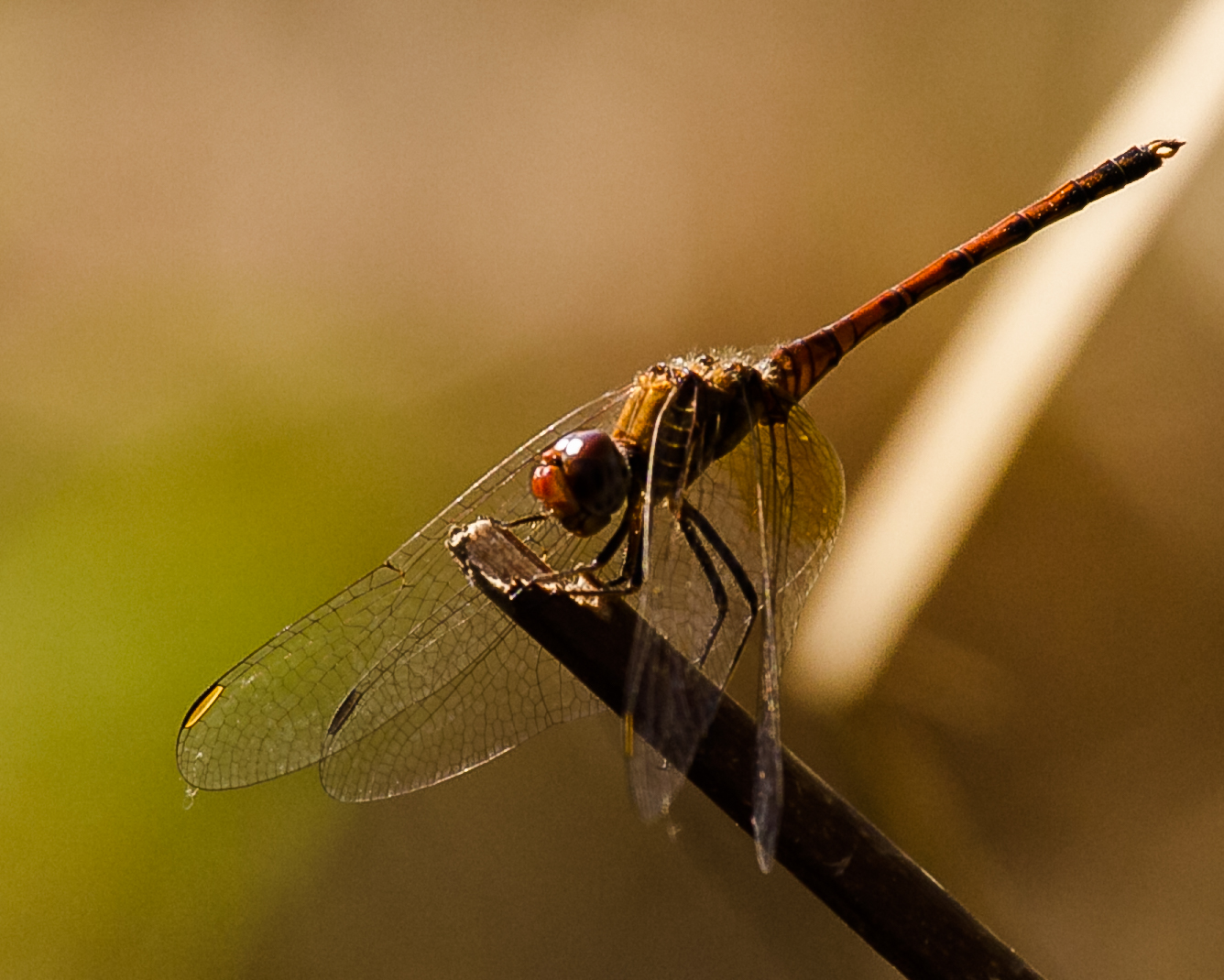
Trithemis werneri

- Trithemis
  - Trithemis aconita, halfshade dropwing (monkshood dropwing)
  - Trithemis annulata, violet dropwing
  - Trithemis arteriosa, red-veined dropwing
  - Trithemis donaldsoni, denim dropwing (Donaldson’s dropwing)
  - Trithemis dorsalis, highland dropwing (dorsal dropwing, round-hook dropwing)
  - Trithemis furva, navy dropwing
  - Trithemis hecate, silhouette dropwing (Hecate dropwing)
  - Trithemis kirbyi, orange-winged dropwing (Kirby’s dropwing)
  - Trithemis pluvialis, russet dropwing (river dropwing, riffle-and-reed dropwing)
  - Trithemis stictica, jaunty dropwing
  - Trithemis werneri, elegant dropwing (Werner’s dropwing)
- Urothemis
  - Urothemis assignata, red basker
  - Urothemis edwardsii, blue basker
  - Urothemis luciana, St Lucia basker
- Zygonoides
  - Zygonoides fuelleborni, southern riverking (Fulleborn’s riverking, robust riverking)
- Zygonyx
  - Zygonyx natalensis, blue cascader (Scuffed Cascader)
  - Zygonyx torridus, ringed cascader
- Zyxomma
  - Zyxomma atlanticum, smoky duskdarter (smoky dusk-darter)
