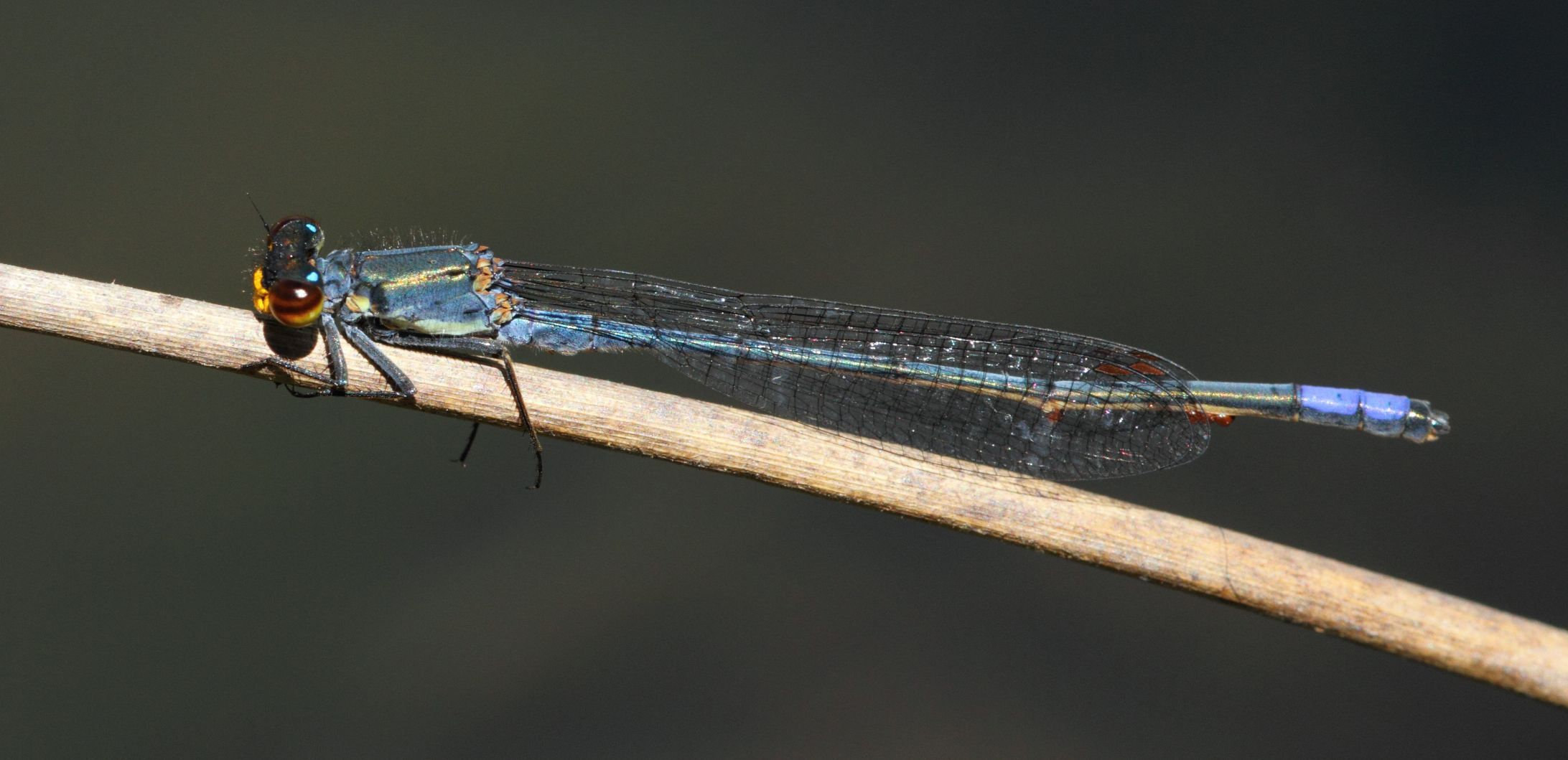
- Male

Conservation status
- Least Concern (IUCN 3.1)

Scientific classification
- Kingdom: Animalia
- Phylum: Arthropoda
- Clade: Pancrustacea
- Class: Insecta
- Order: Odonata
- Suborder: Zygoptera
- Family: Coenagrionidae
- Genus: Pseudagrion
- Species: P. citricola

Binomial name
- Pseudagrion citricola Barnard, 1937

= Pseudagrion citricola =

Species of damselfly

Pseudagrion citricola is a species of damselfly in the family Coenagrionidae. It is commonly known as the yellow-faced sprite.

== Distribution and status ==
This sprite is endemic to South Africa and Lesotho; It is most common in highland grasslands, but is also found in the Karoo and at low elevations in parts of the Western Cape and Eastern Cape. The species currently has no known threats. Its population is locally abundant and apparently stable.

== Habitat ==
Pseudagrion citricola is found at pools and slow-flowing sections of streams and rivers.

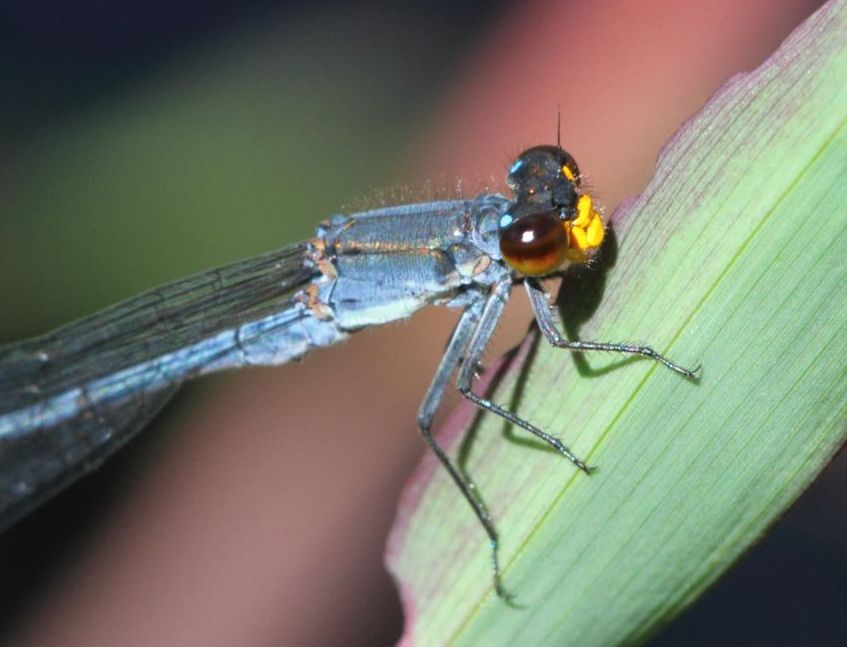
Male yellow-faced sprite. uKhahlamba / Drakensberg Park

== Description ==
The face of the mature male is bright yellow, and the top of the head is black with bright blue postocular spots. The upper eyes are black, with the lower parts being yellow, amber and light green. The upper thorax is dark blue, shiny when young, and becoming lightly pruinescent with age; it is greenish blue below. The abdomen is dull dark blue, and more pruinecsent in older specimens; the upper half of S8 and S9 are bright mauve-blue. The wings are clear with dull brown pterostigmata, which darken with age.

== Identification ==
There are only two other sprites with yellow faces in South Africa; Pseudagrion gamblesi is much larger, has a striped thorax, and is restricted to faster-flowing rivers at lower altitudes in KwaZulu-Natal and Mpumalanga. Pseudagrion citricola is found throughout the range of Pseudagrion caffrum, but the latter does not have blue postocular spots, and it has brighter rusty red pterostigmata.

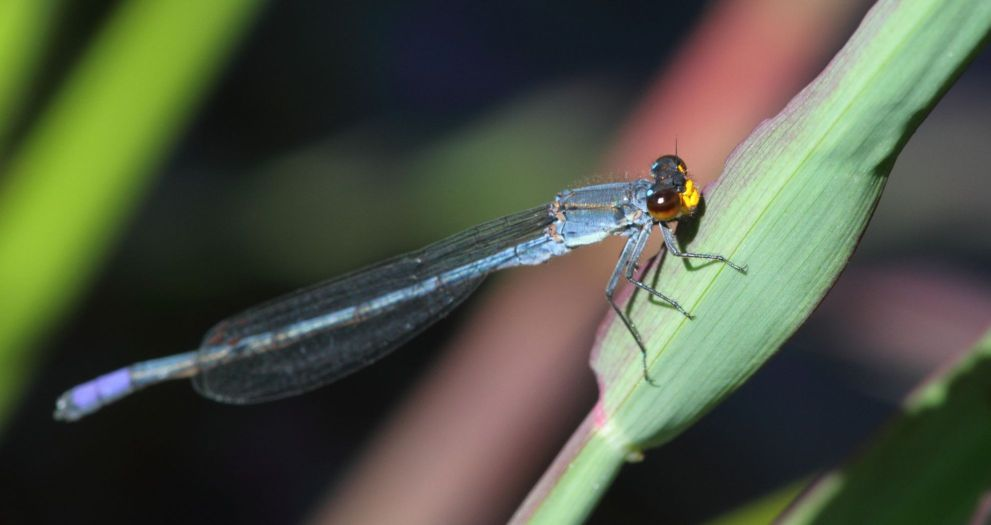
Male

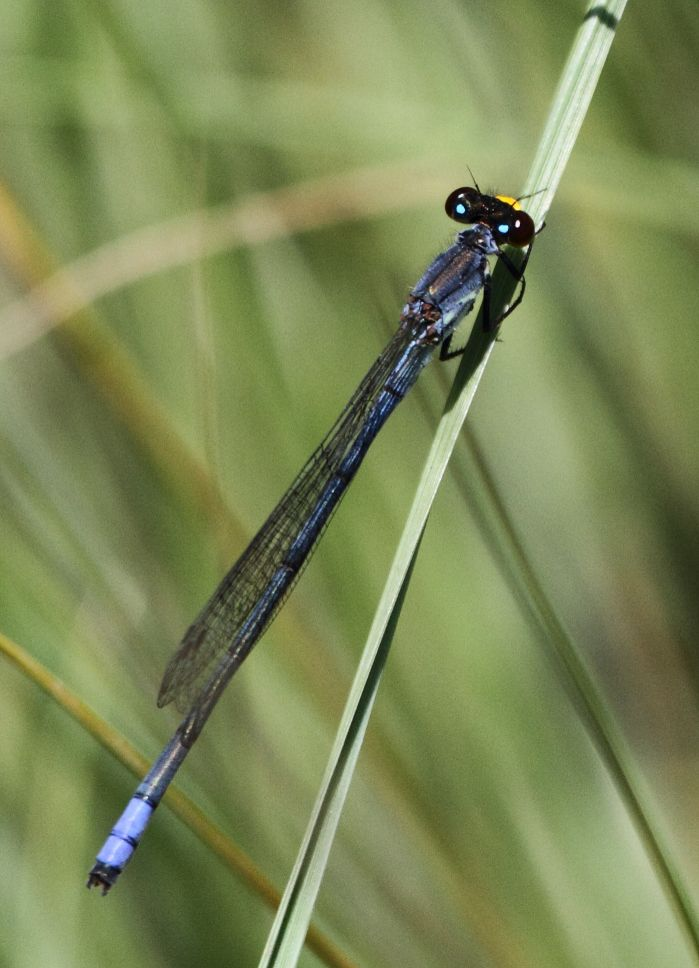
Male

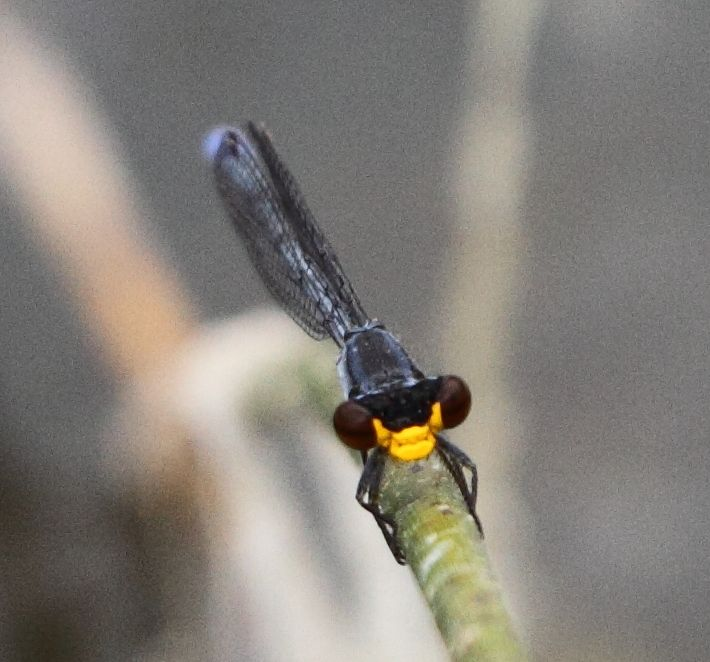
Male

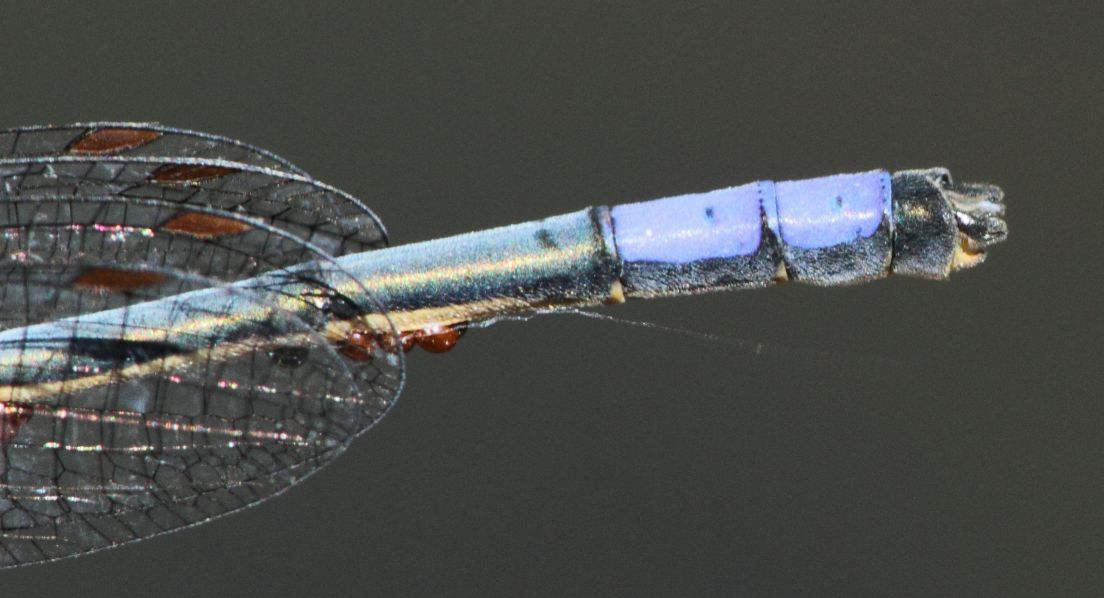
Tail (abdomen) of male

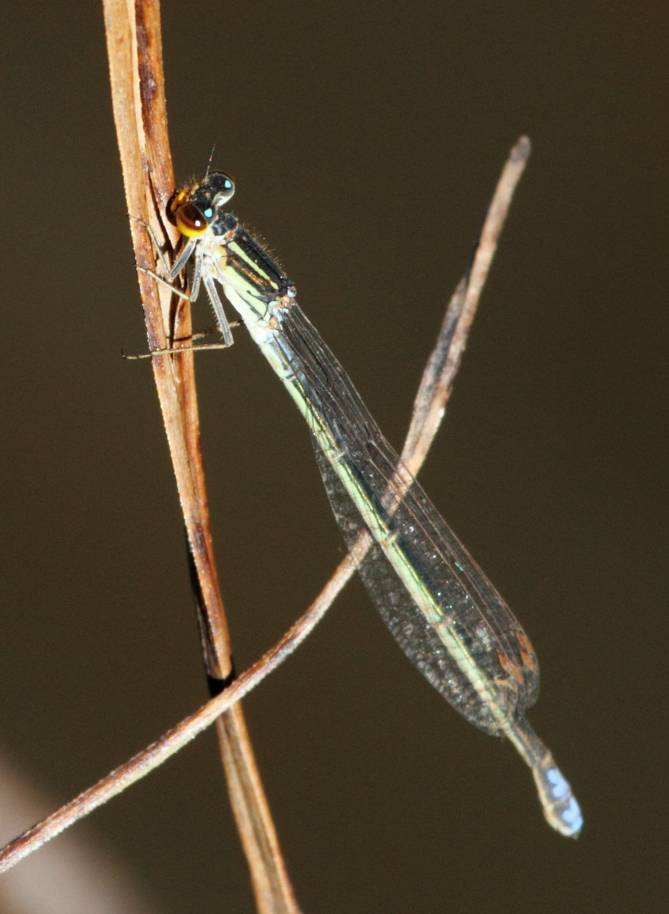
Female
