= Zygonoides fraseri =

Conservation status
- Least Concern (IUCN 3.1)

Scientific classification
- Kingdom: Animalia
- Phylum: Arthropoda
- Class: Insecta
- Order: Odonata
- Infraorder: Anisoptera
- Family: Libellulidae
- Genus: Zygonoides
- Species: Z. fraseri

Binomial name
- Zygonoides fraseri (Pinhey, 1956)

Species of dragonfly

Zygonoides fraseri is a species of dragonfly in the family Libellulidae. It is found in Ghana and Uganda. Its natural habitats are dry savanna, subtropical or tropical dry shrubland, and rivers.
