= Notiothemis robertsi =

Conservation status
- Least Concern (IUCN 3.1)

Scientific classification
- Kingdom: Animalia
- Phylum: Arthropoda
- Class: Insecta
- Order: Odonata
- Infraorder: Anisoptera
- Family: Libellulidae
- Genus: Notiothemis
- Species: N. robertsi

Binomial name
- Notiothemis robertsi Fraser, 1944

Species of dragonfly

Notiothemis robertsi is a species of dragonfly in the family Libellulidae. It is found in Cameroon, Central African Republic, the Republic of the Congo, the Democratic Republic of the Congo, Ivory Coast, Gabon, Ghana, Guinea, Kenya, Liberia, Nigeria, Tanzania, Uganda, and Zambia. Its natural habitat is subtropical or tropical moist lowland forests.
