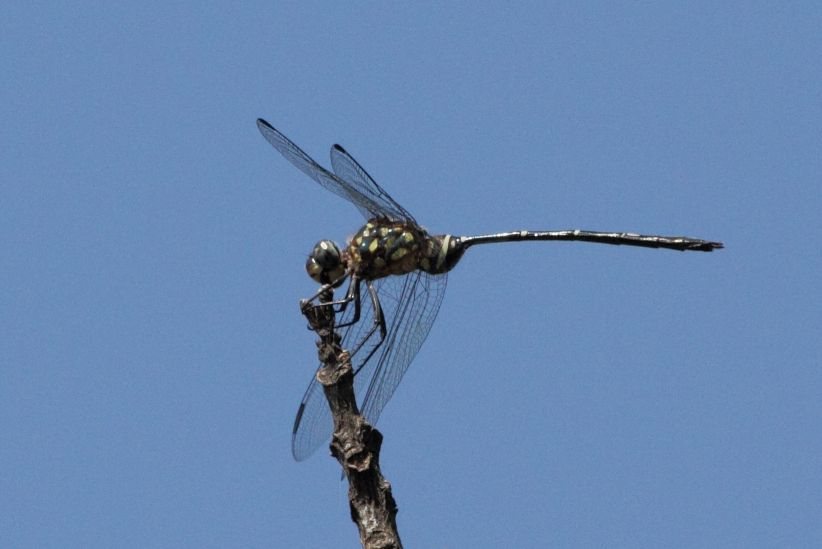
- Male

Conservation status
- Least Concern (IUCN 3.1)

Scientific classification
- Kingdom: Animalia
- Phylum: Arthropoda
- Class: Insecta
- Order: Odonata
- Infraorder: Anisoptera
- Family: Libellulidae
- Genus: Olpogastra
- Species: O. lugubris

Binomial name
- Olpogastra lugubris (Karsch, 1895)

Synonyms
- Libellula lugubris

= Olpogastra =

Species of dragonfly

Olpogastra lugubris, the slender bottletail, is a species of dragonfly in the family Libellulidae; it is the only species in its genus.

== Distribution ==
This species is widespread in sub-Saharan Africa; It is found in Benin, Botswana, Cameroon, Central African Republic, Chad, the Republic of the Congo, the Democratic Republic of the Congo, Ivory Coast, Equatorial Guinea, Gabon, Gambia, Ghana, Guinea, Kenya, Liberia, Malawi, Mali, Mozambique, Namibia, Nigeria, Sierra Leone, Somalia, South Africa, Sudan, Tanzania, Togo, Uganda, Zambia, Zimbabwe, and possibly Burundi.

== Identification ==
Length 56mm, wingspan 84mm. The slender bottle-tail is largish, has a long slender abdomen ringed with narrow yellow bands and narrow waist. The thorax has yellow spots and is olive in colour. The wings are long and are washed with yellow.

== Habitat ==
Rivers, floodplains, streams and lakes with sedges or reeds.

== Identification ==
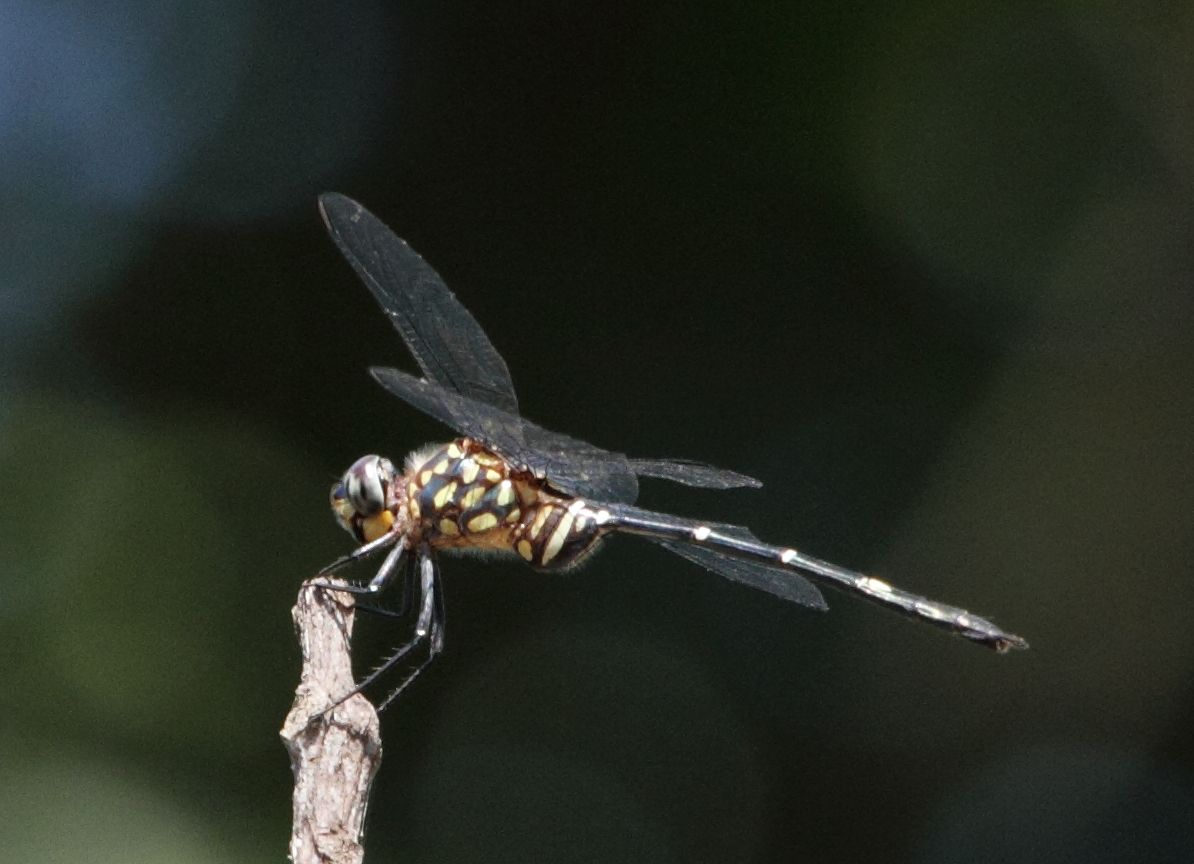
Male

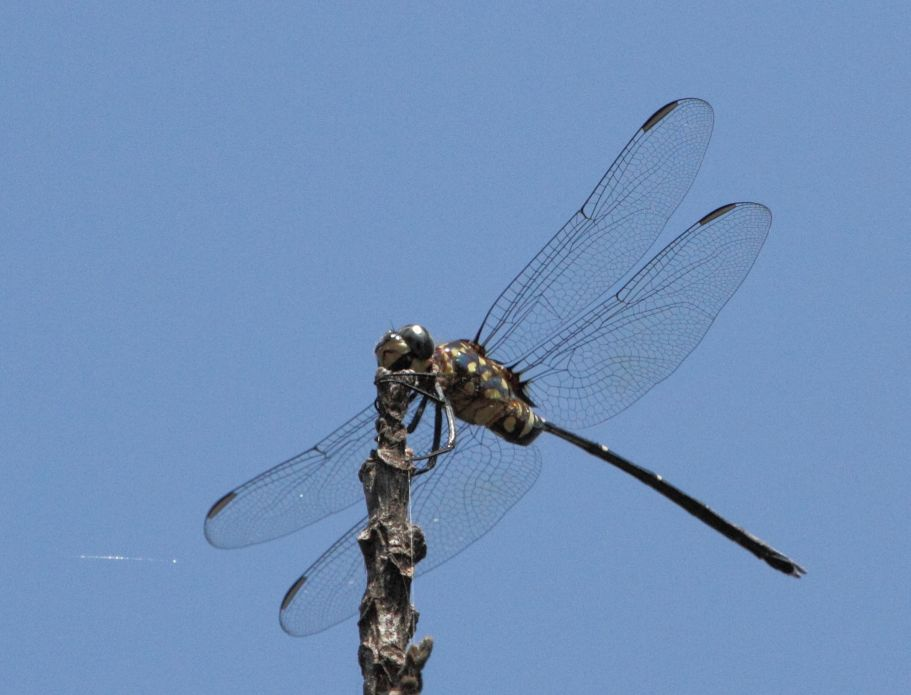
Male
