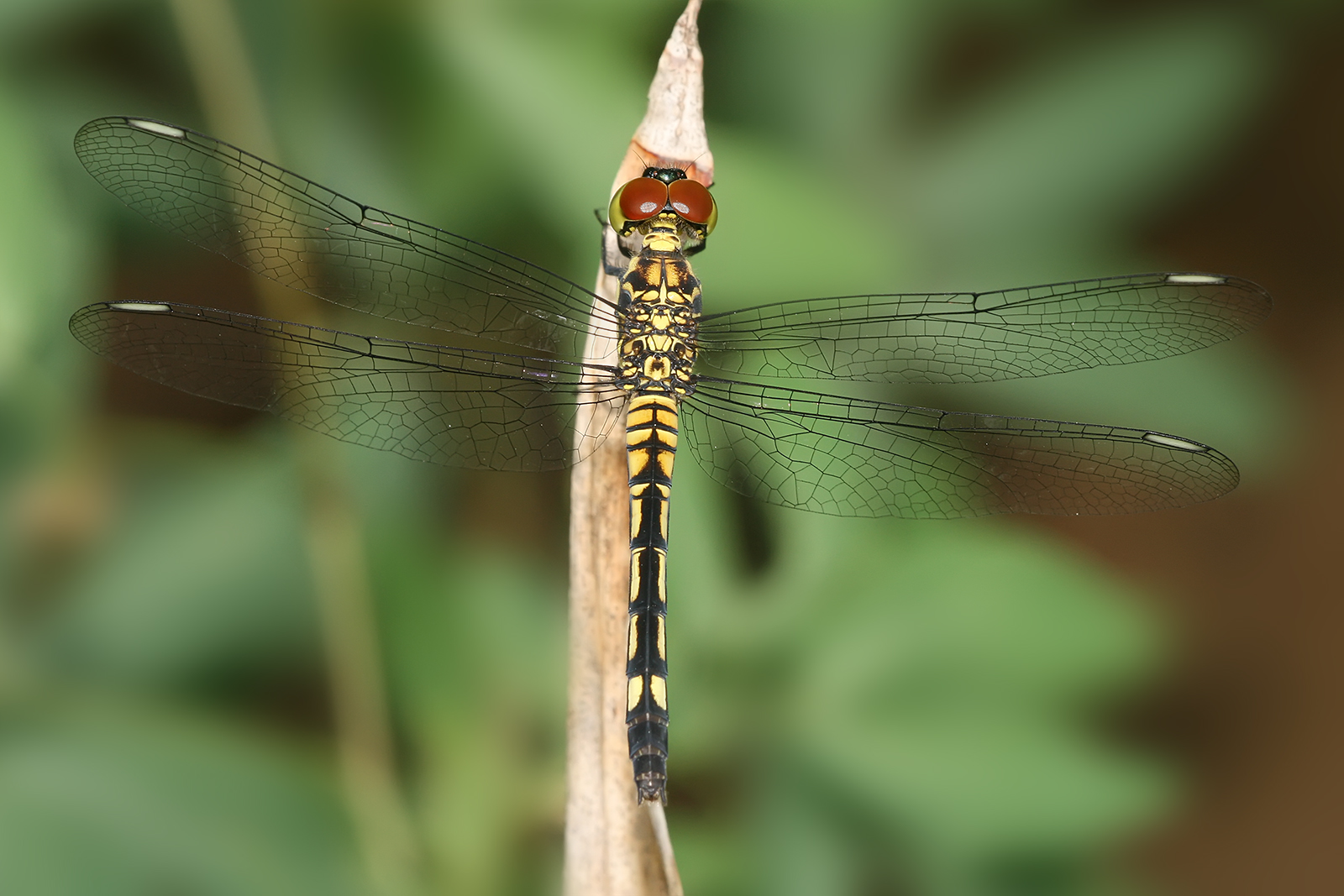
- Female in Dar es Salaam, Tanzania

Conservation status
- Least Concern (IUCN 3.1)

Scientific classification
- Kingdom: Animalia
- Phylum: Arthropoda
- Class: Insecta
- Order: Odonata
- Infraorder: Anisoptera
- Family: Libellulidae
- Genus: Chalcostephia; Kirby, 1889
- Species: C. flavifrons

Binomial name
- Chalcostephia flavifrons Kirby, 1889

= Chalcostephia =

Genus of dragonflies

Chalcostephia is a monotypic genus of dragonflies in the family Libellulidae containing the single species Chalcostephia flavifrons. It is known by the common names yellowface and inspector. It is native to central Africa, where it has a widespread distribution. This dragonfly lives in swampy habitats. It is affected by the drainage and reclamation of swamps for agriculture, but it is not considered to be threatened.

== Description ==
Chalcostephia flavifrons is a fairly small species of dragonfly, with a hind-wing length of 24 to 29 mm (0.9 to 1.1 in). The mature adult male is a bluish-grey colour and pruinose (covered with a dusting of wax particles on top of the cuticle). The adult female and the newly emerged male are dark with bold yellow banding. Both males and females can be distinguished from other similar species by their yellow face contrasting with the flattened, metallic green frons (front of the head). The membranous, veined wings are transparent except for the pterostigmata, a small group of thickened cells at the leading edge of the wing-tips, which have pale centres and dark edges.

== Distribution and habitat ==
This species has a widespread distribution over tropical and sub-tropical, sub-Saharan Africa. Its range includes Angola, Benin, Botswana, Burkina Faso, Cameroon, Central African Republic, Democratic Republic of the Congo, Equatorial Guinea, Ethiopia, Gabon, Gambia, Ghana, Guinee-Bissau, Ivory Coast, Kenya, Liberia, Malawi, Mali, Mozambique, Namibia, Nigeria, Republic of Guinea, Republic of the Congo, Rwanda, Senegal, Sierra Leone, South Africa, South Sudan, Tanzania, Togo, Uganda, Zambia and Zimbabwe. Suitable habitat includes temporary and permanent pools with submerged or emergent vegetation, streams and rivers, channels in swamps and marshes, gallery forests, forest clearings and open areas including savannah and shrubby areas. It generally occurs at altitudes of less than 1,800 m (6,000 ft) and is more common below 900 m (3,000 ft).

== Status ==
Although C. flavifrons faces the threat of habitat destruction from the drainage of the wetlands it favours for conversion to agricultural use, it currently has a wide range. The International Union for Conservation of Nature has assessed its conservation status as being of least concern.
