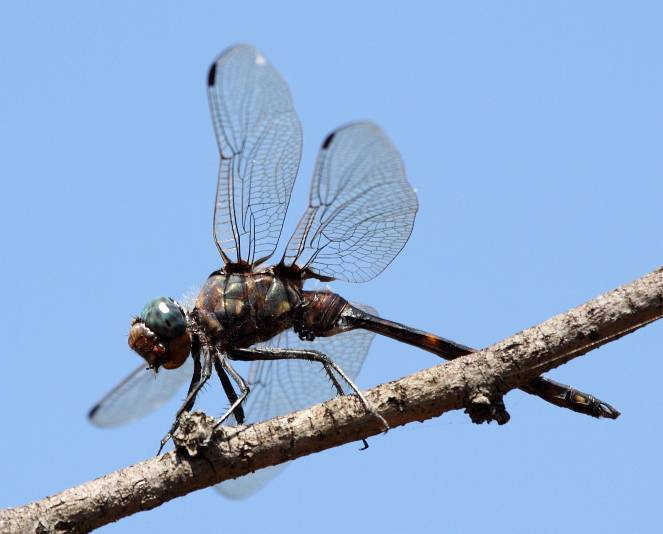
- Male

Conservation status
- Least Concern (IUCN 3.1)

Scientific classification
- Kingdom: Animalia
- Phylum: Arthropoda
- Class: Insecta
- Order: Odonata
- Infraorder: Anisoptera
- Family: Libellulidae
- Genus: Zygonoides
- Species: Z. fuelleborni

Binomial name
- Zygonoides fuelleborni (Grünberg, 1902)

= Zygonoides fuelleborni =

Species of dragonfly

Zygonoides fuelleborni is a species of dragonfly in the family Libellulidae. It is found in Angola, Botswana, Cameroon, the Democratic Republic of the Congo, Kenya, Malawi, Mozambique, Namibia, Nigeria, South Africa, Sudan, Tanzania, Uganda, Zambia, Zimbabwe, and possibly Burundi. Its natural habitats are subtropical or tropical moist lowland forests, subtropical or tropical dry shrubland, subtropical or tropical moist shrubland, and rivers.
