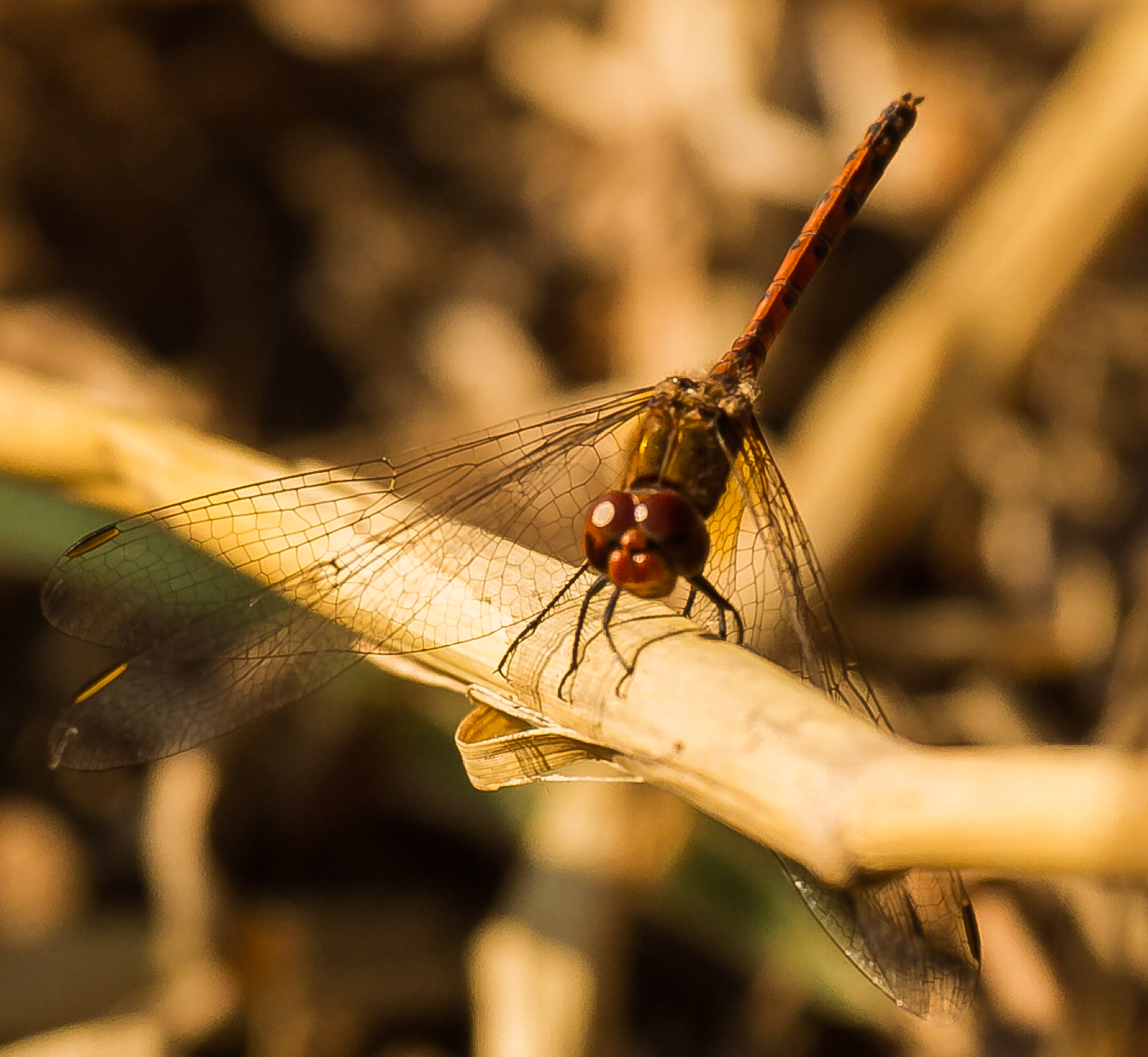
- Male

Conservation status
- Least Concern (IUCN 3.1)

Scientific classification
- Kingdom: Animalia
- Phylum: Arthropoda
- Class: Insecta
- Order: Odonata
- Infraorder: Anisoptera
- Family: Libellulidae
- Genus: Trithemis
- Species: T. werneri

Binomial name
- Trithemis werneri Ris, 1912

= Trithemis werneri =

Species of dragonfly

Trithemis werneri is a species of dragonfly in the family Libellulidae. It is found in Angola, the Republic of the Congo, the Democratic Republic of the Congo, Kenya, Malawi, Mozambique, Namibia, Nigeria, South Africa, Sudan, Tanzania, Uganda, Zambia, Zimbabwe, and possibly Burundi. Its natural habitats are subtropical or tropical moist lowland forests, subtropical or tropical dry shrubland, subtropical or tropical moist shrubland, and rivers.

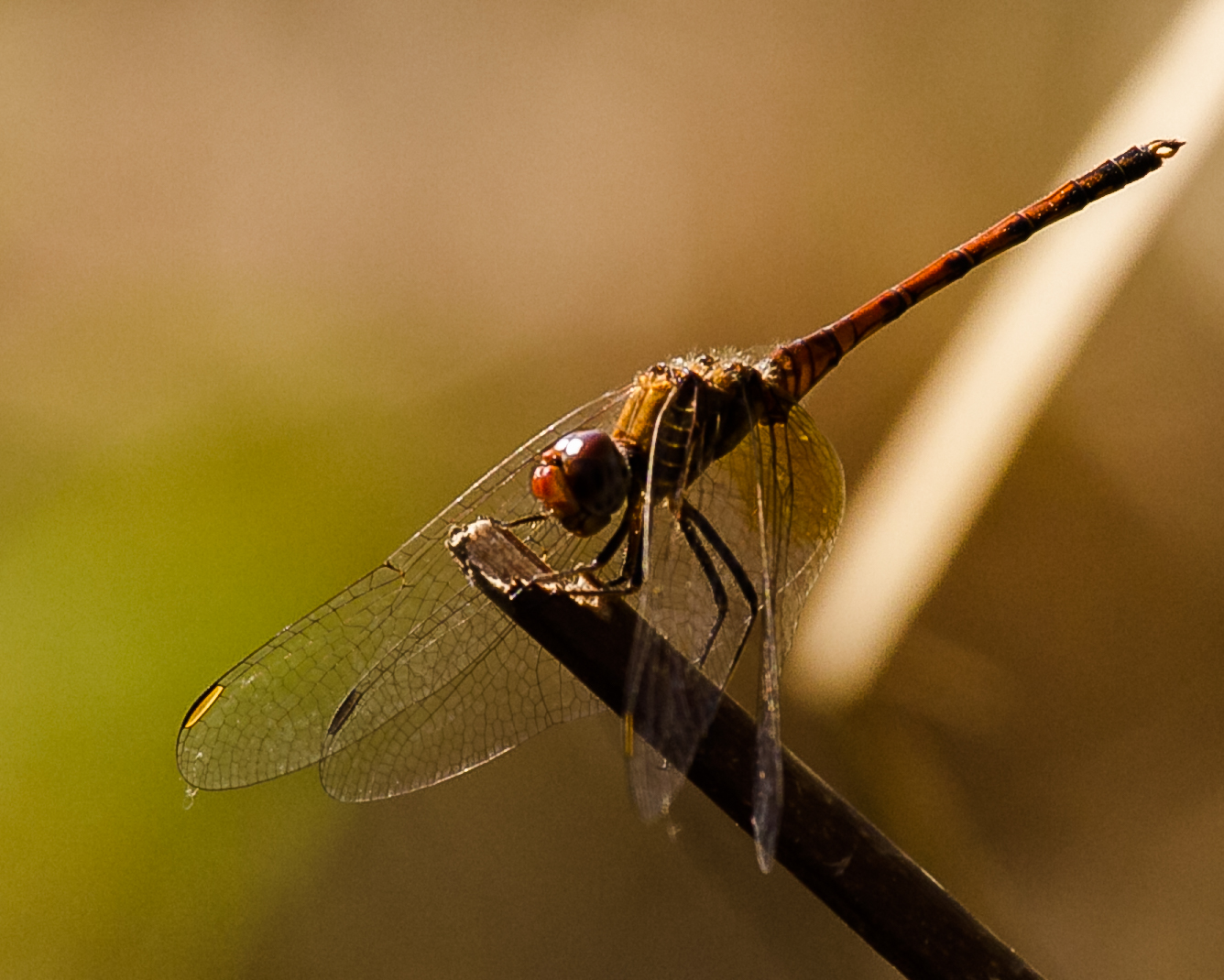
Trithemis werneri, Elegant Dropwing
