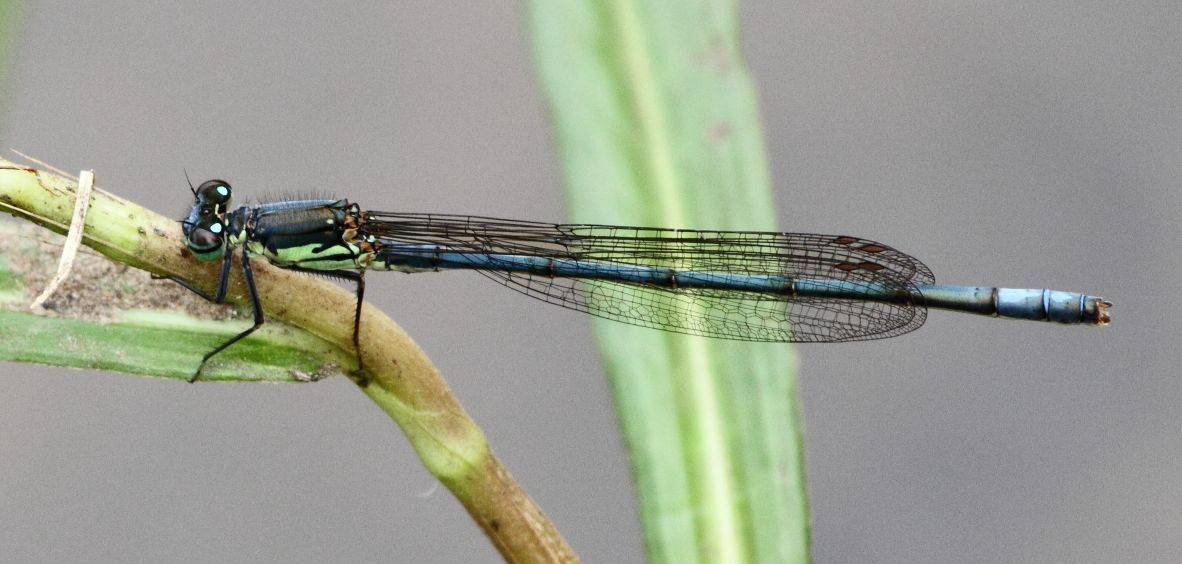
- Male
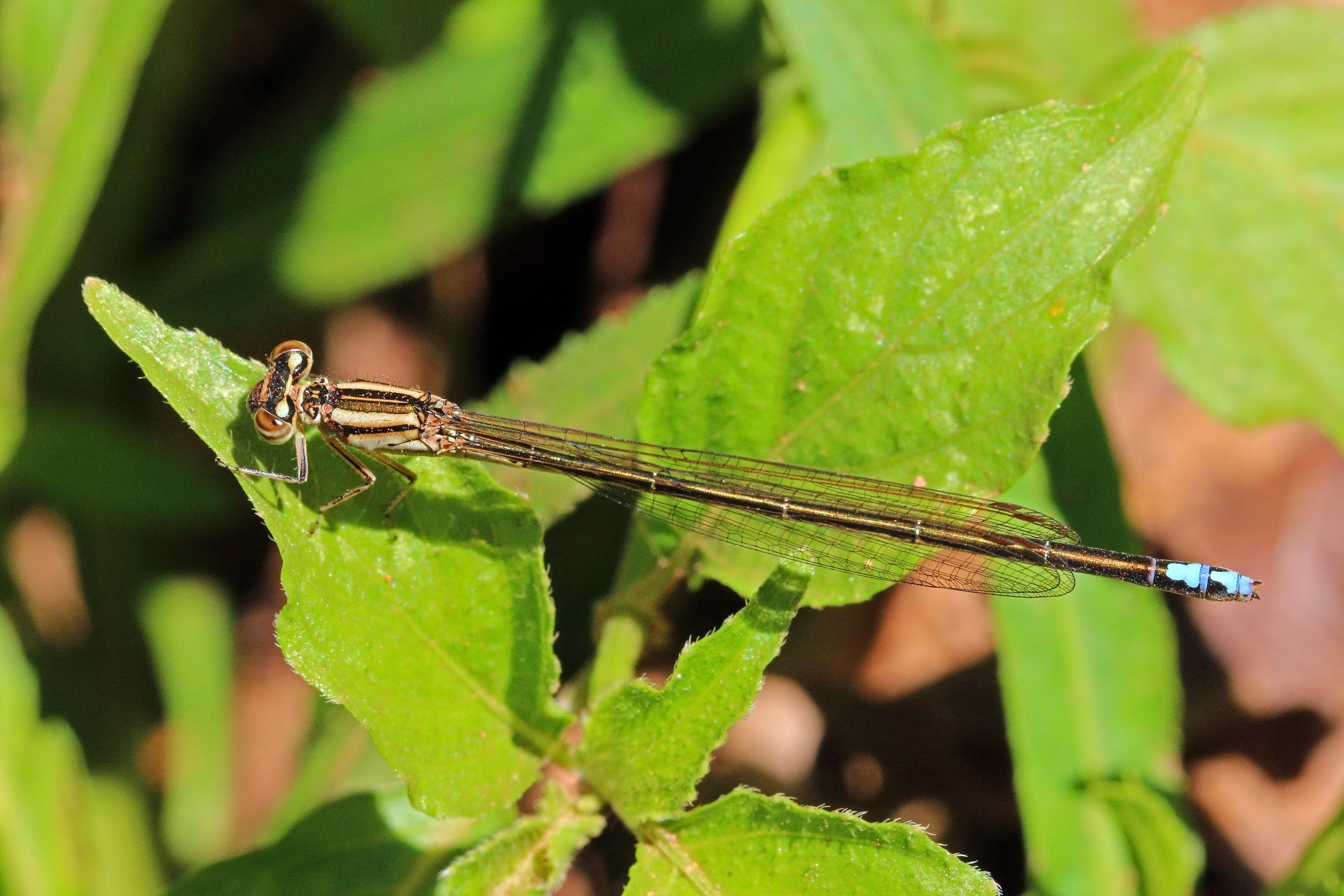
- female Kakamega Forest, Kenya

Conservation status
- Least Concern (IUCN 3.1)

Scientific classification
- Kingdom: Animalia
- Phylum: Arthropoda
- Clade: Pancrustacea
- Class: Insecta
- Order: Odonata
- Suborder: Zygoptera
- Family: Coenagrionidae
- Genus: Pseudagrion
- Species: P. spernatum

Binomial name
- Pseudagrion spernatum Hagen in Selys, 1881

= Pseudagrion spernatum =

Species of damselfly

Pseudagrion spernatum, the Natal sprite, is a species of damselfly in the family Coenagrionidae. It is found in Angola, the Democratic Republic of the Congo, Ethiopia, Kenya, Malawi, Mozambique, South Africa, Tanzania, Uganda, Zambia, Zimbabwe, possibly Burundi, and possibly the Republic of the Congo. Its natural habitats are subtropical or tropical moist montane forests, subtropical or tropical high-altitude shrubland, and rivers.

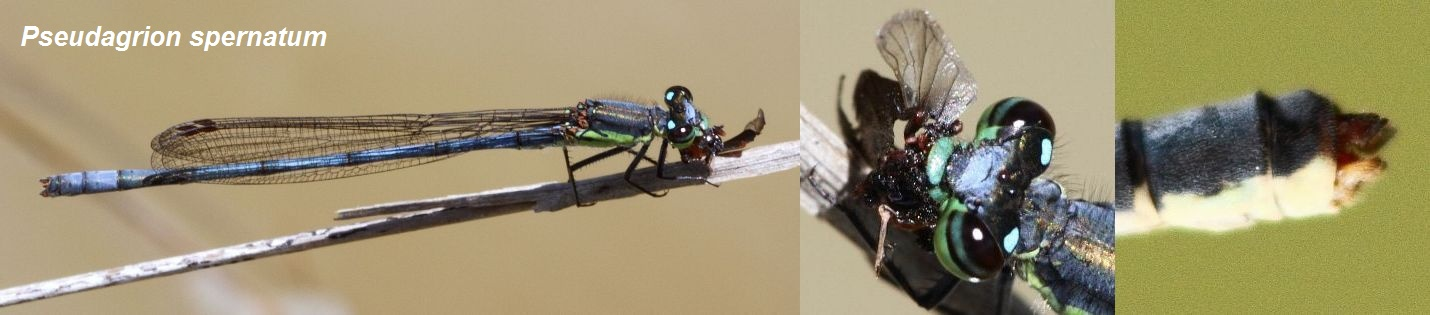
male

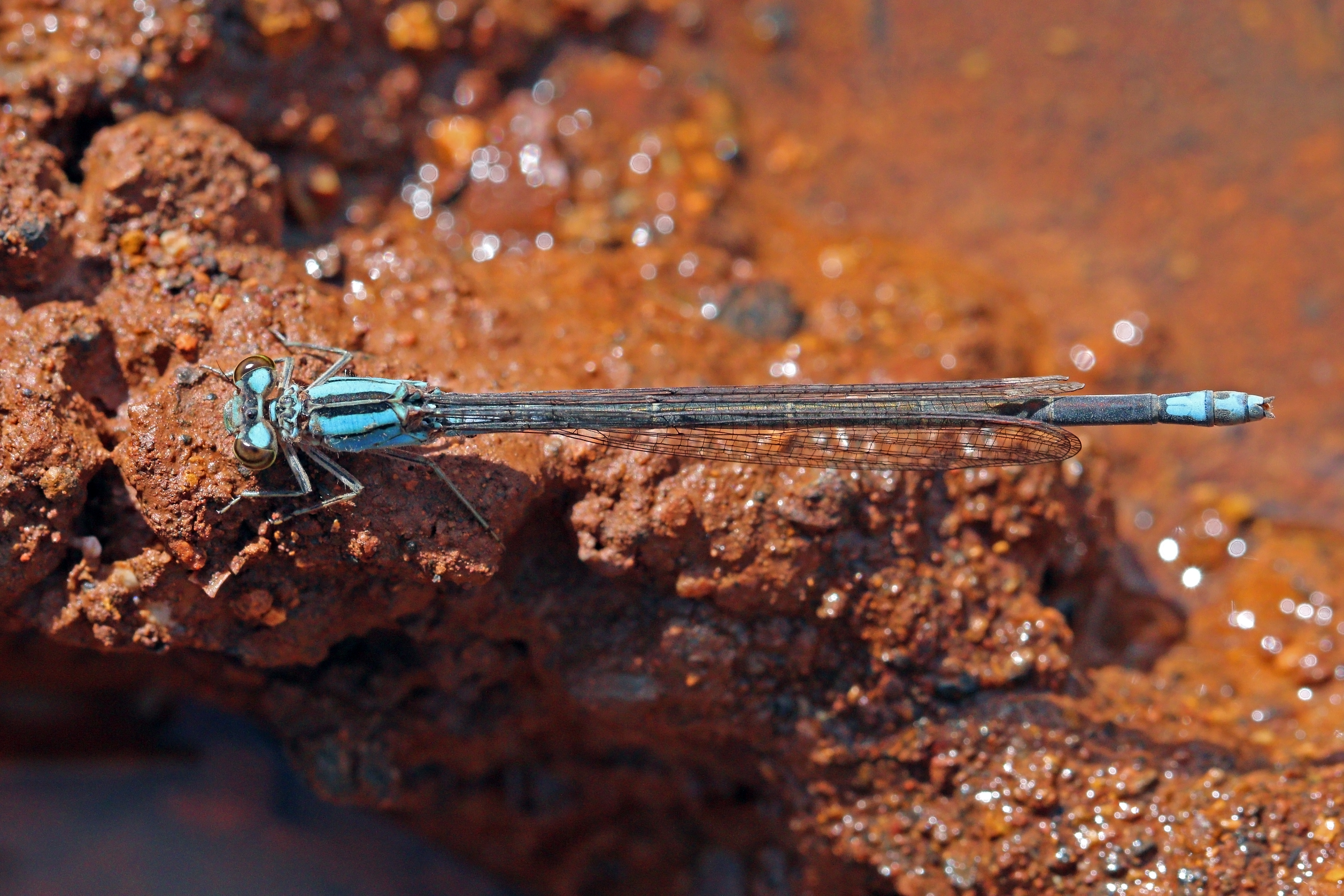
female blue morph
