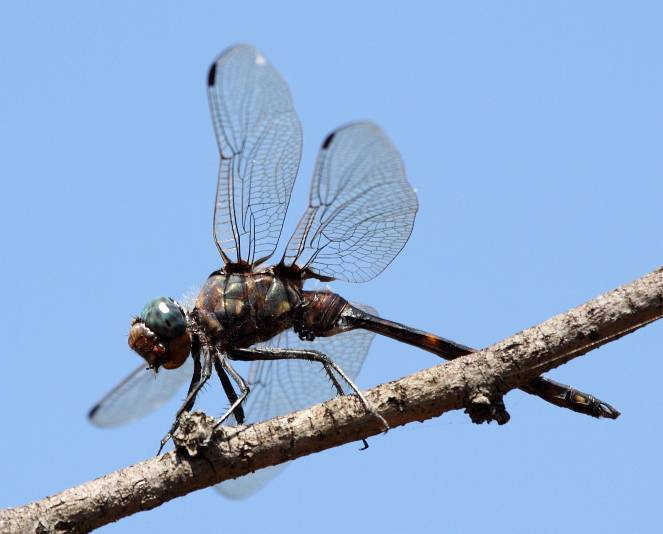
- Zygonoides fuelleborni

Scientific classification
- Kingdom: Animalia
- Phylum: Arthropoda
- Clade: Pancrustacea
- Class: Insecta
- Order: Odonata
- Infraorder: Anisoptera
- Family: Libellulidae
- Subfamily: Zygonychinae
- Genus: Zygonoides; Fraser, 1957

= Zygonoides =

Genus of dragonflies

Zygonoides is a genus of dragonflies in the family Libellulidae. There are large, spectacular species. Three species occur in continental Africa and one, F. lachesis, in Madagascar.

The genus contains the following species:

- Zygonoides fraseri (Pinhey, 1955)
- Zygonoides fuelleborni (Grünberg, 1902) - Fuelleborn's Bottle-tail, Robust Bottletail, Robust Riverking
- Zygonoides lachesis (Ris, 1912)
- Zygonoides occidentis (Ris, 1912)
