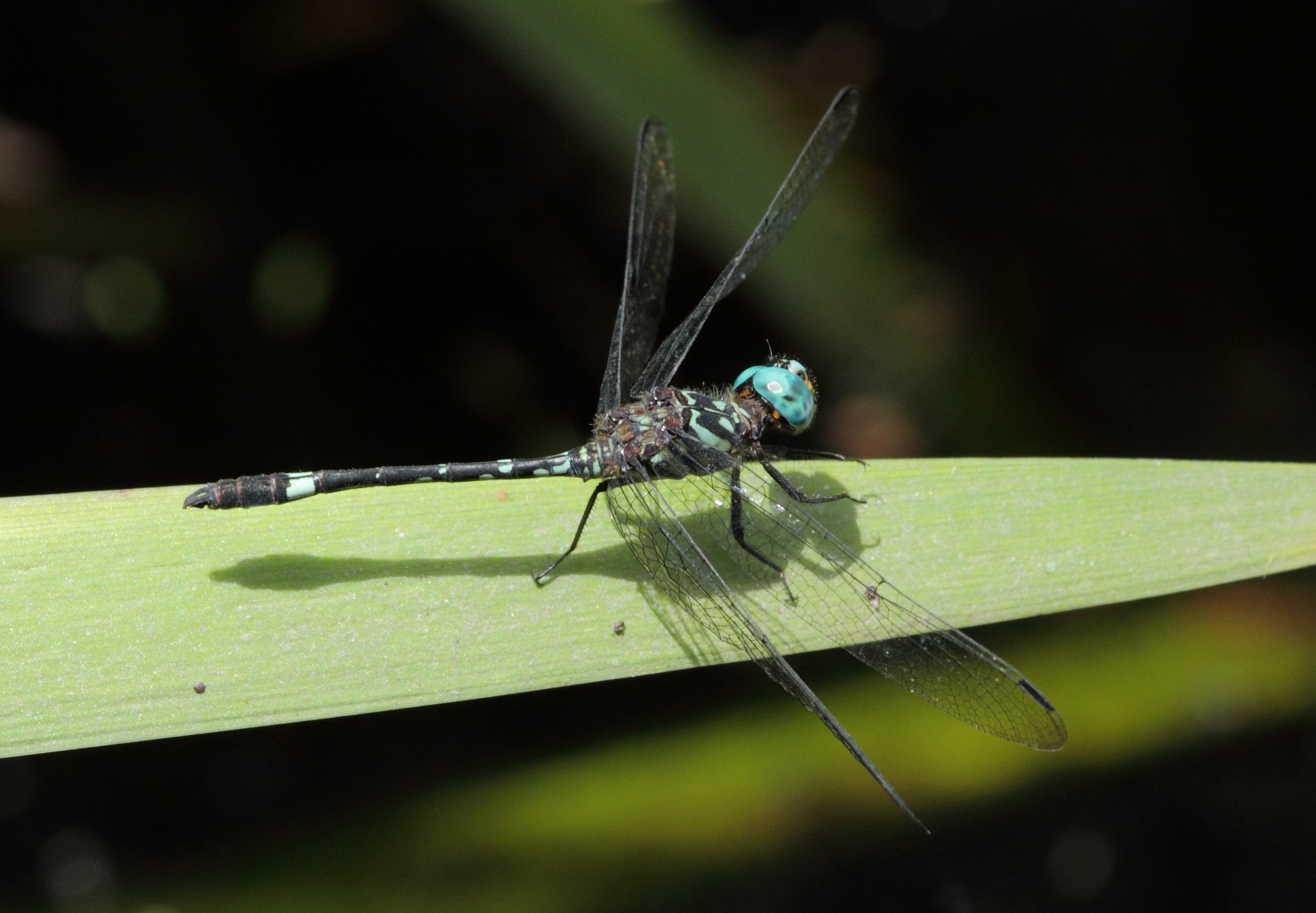
- Notiothemis jonesi

Scientific classification
- Kingdom: Animalia
- Phylum: Arthropoda
- Class: Insecta
- Order: Odonata
- Infraorder: Anisoptera
- Family: Libellulidae
- Genus: Notiothemis; Ris, 1919

= Notiothemis =

Genus of dragonflies

Notiothemis is a genus of dragonflies in the family Libellulidae. They are commonly known as forestwatchers.

== Species ==
The genus contains only two species:

Male	Female	Scientific name	Common name	Distribution
		Notiothemis jonesi Ris, 1921	Jones' Forestwatcher, Eastern Elf	south east Africa
		Notiothemis robertsi Fraser, 1944	Robert's Forestwatcher	central and west Africa
