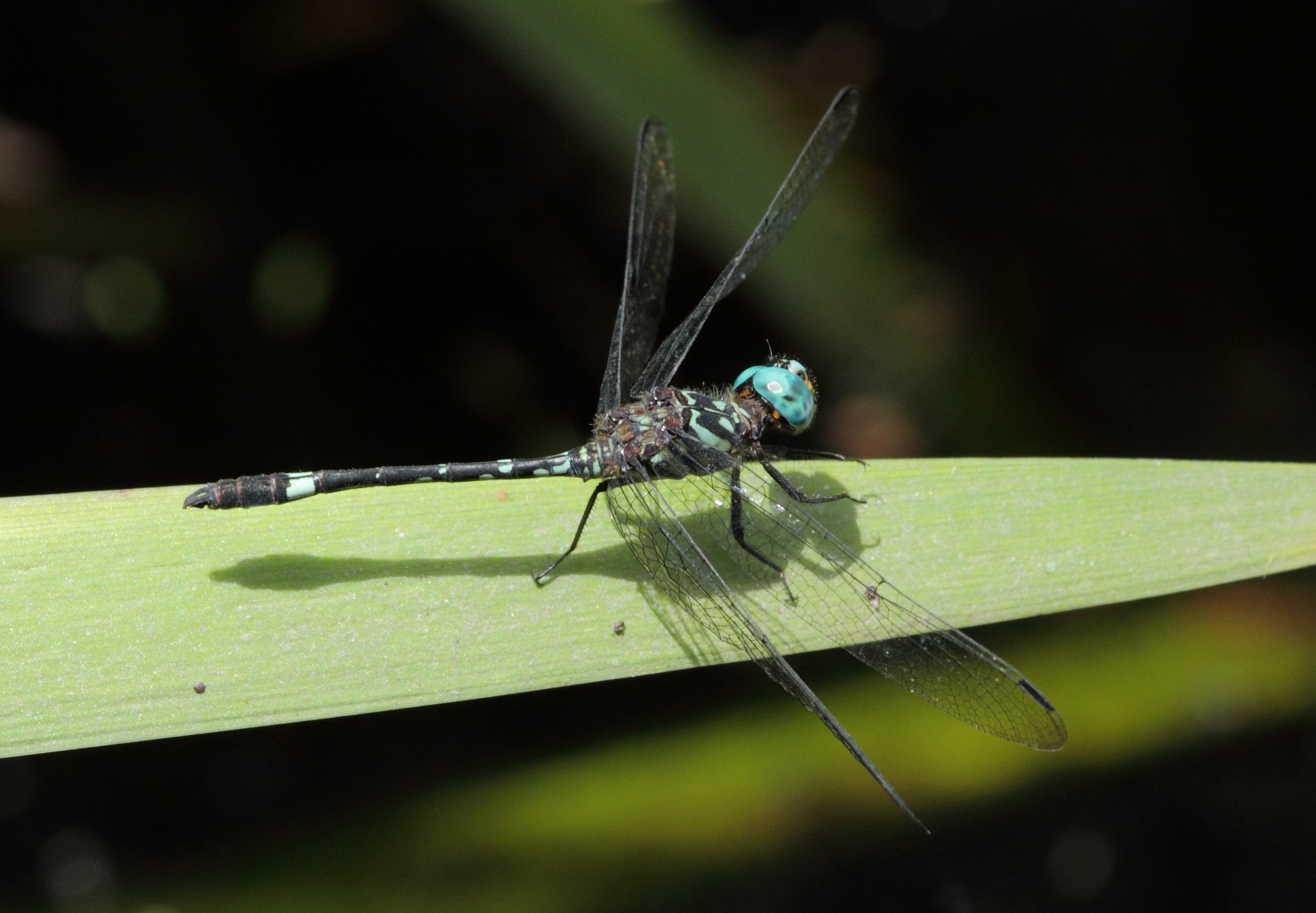
- Male
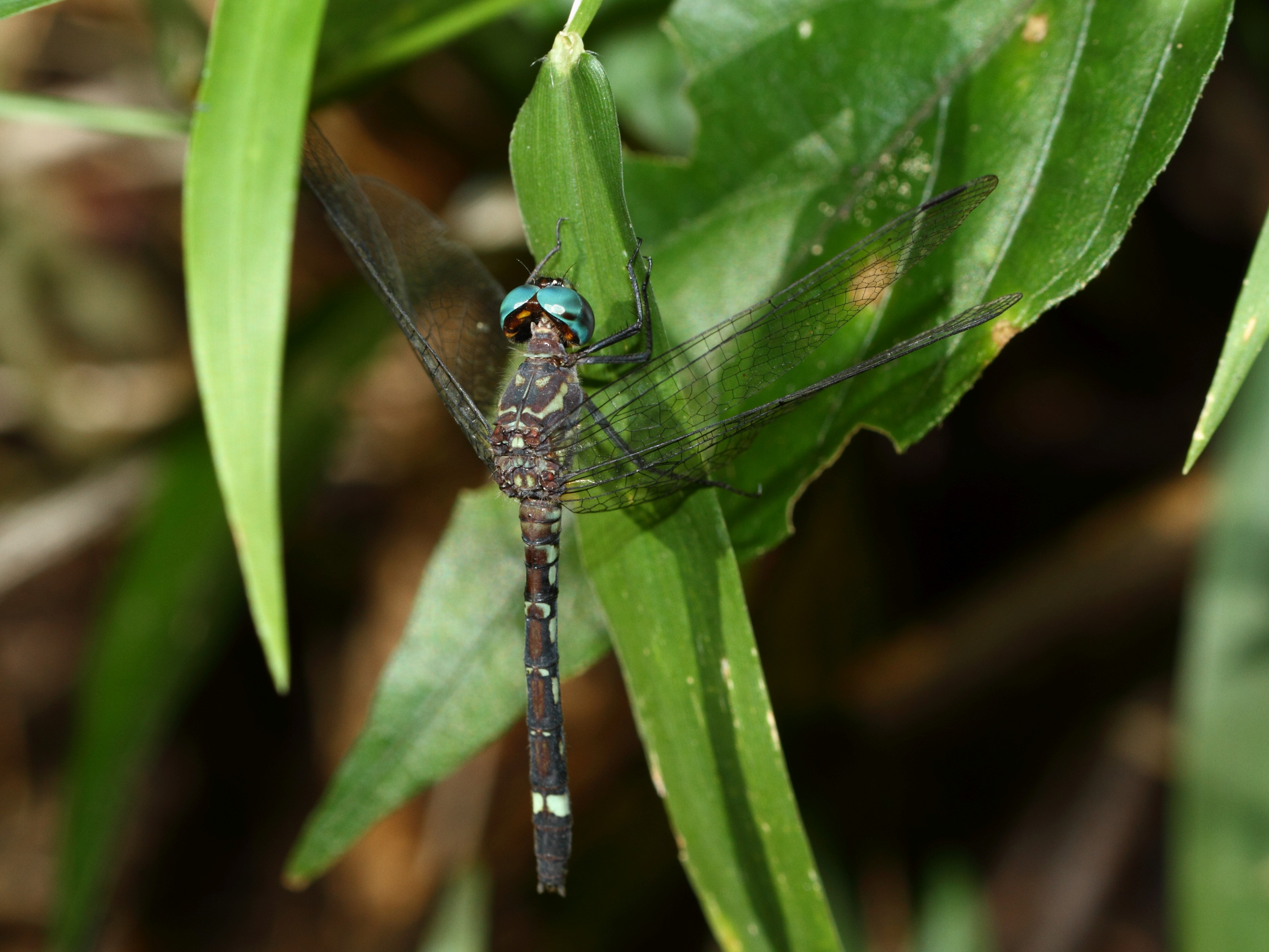
- Female

Conservation status
- Least Concern (IUCN 3.1)

Scientific classification
- Kingdom: Animalia
- Phylum: Arthropoda
- Class: Insecta
- Order: Odonata
- Infraorder: Anisoptera
- Family: Libellulidae
- Genus: Notiothemis
- Species: N. jonesi

Binomial name
- Notiothemis jonesi Ris, 1919

= Notiothemis jonesi =

Species of dragonfly

Notiothemis jonesi, the eastern forestwatcher, Jones' forestwatcher or eastern elf, is a species of dragonfly in the family Libellulidae. It is found from South Africa to Kenya, Uganda, Malawi and Zambia (including Zimbabwe, Mozambique and Tanzania). Its natural habitats include pools and swamps in subtropical or tropical forests; absent from lowlands.

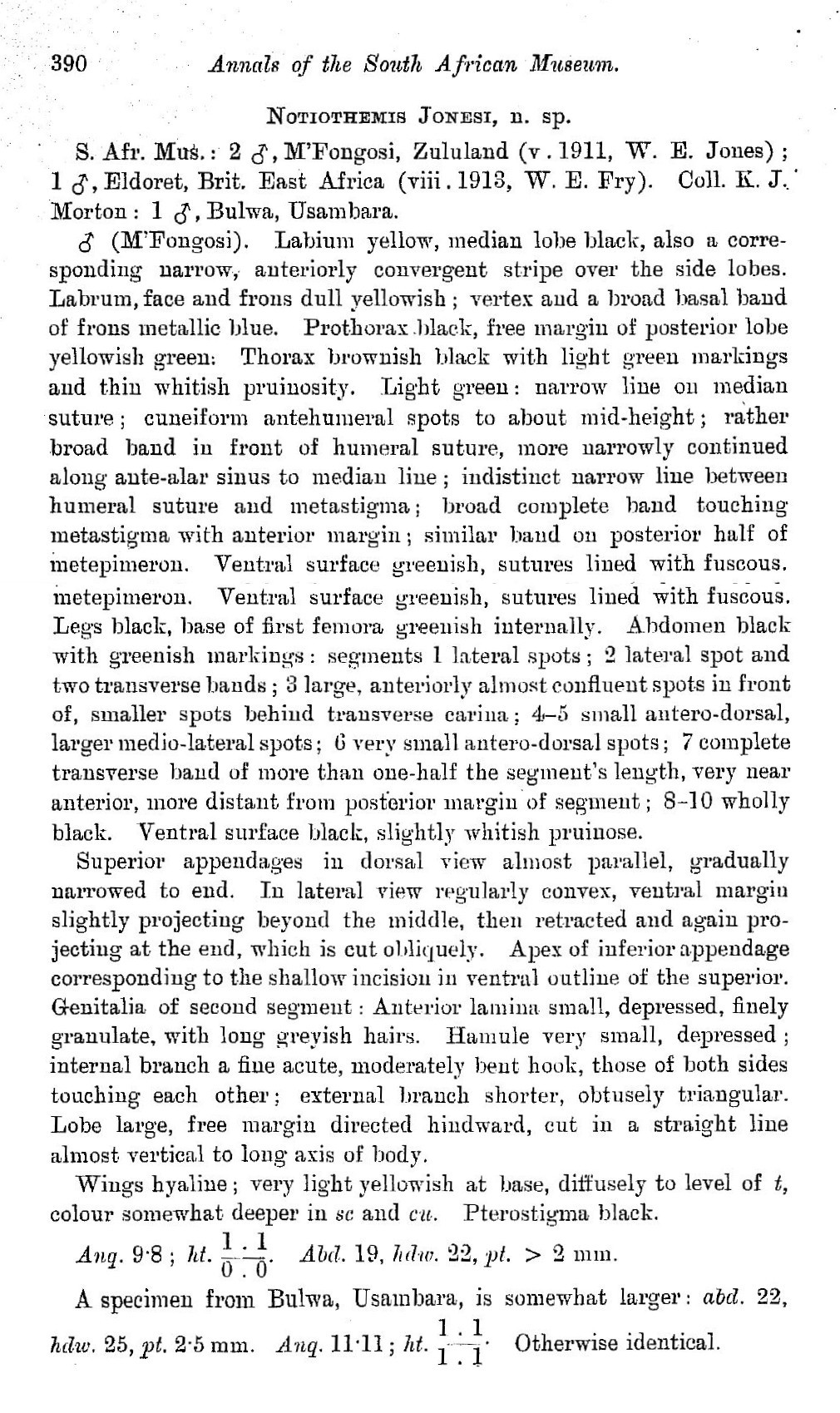
Description by Ris (1921)
