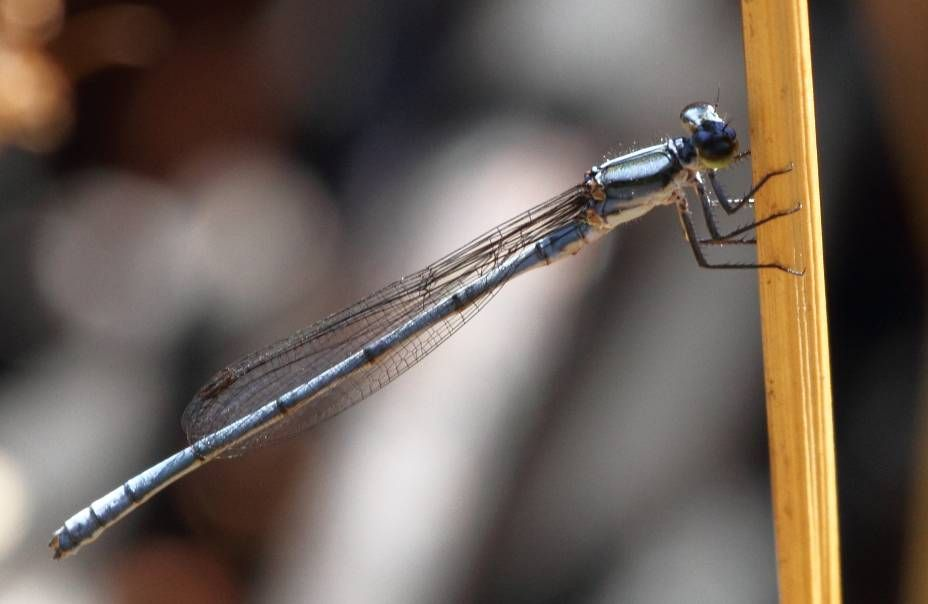
- Male

Conservation status
- Least Concern (IUCN 3.1)

Scientific classification
- Kingdom: Animalia
- Phylum: Arthropoda
- Clade: Pancrustacea
- Class: Insecta
- Order: Odonata
- Suborder: Zygoptera
- Family: Coenagrionidae
- Genus: Pseudagrion
- Species: P. furcigerum

Binomial name
- Pseudagrion furcigerum (Rambur, 1842)

= Pseudagrion furcigerum =

Species of damselfly

Pseudagrion furcigerum is a species of damselfly in the family Coenagrionidae. It is commonly known as the Palmiet sprite.

== Distribution and status ==
This sprite is endemic to South Africa; It is found at low elevations in the Western Cape and the south western parts of the Eastern Cape. The species currently has no known threats. Its population locally abundant and apparently stable.

== Habitat ==
Adults are found at the margins of pools, streams and rivers that are well vegetated.

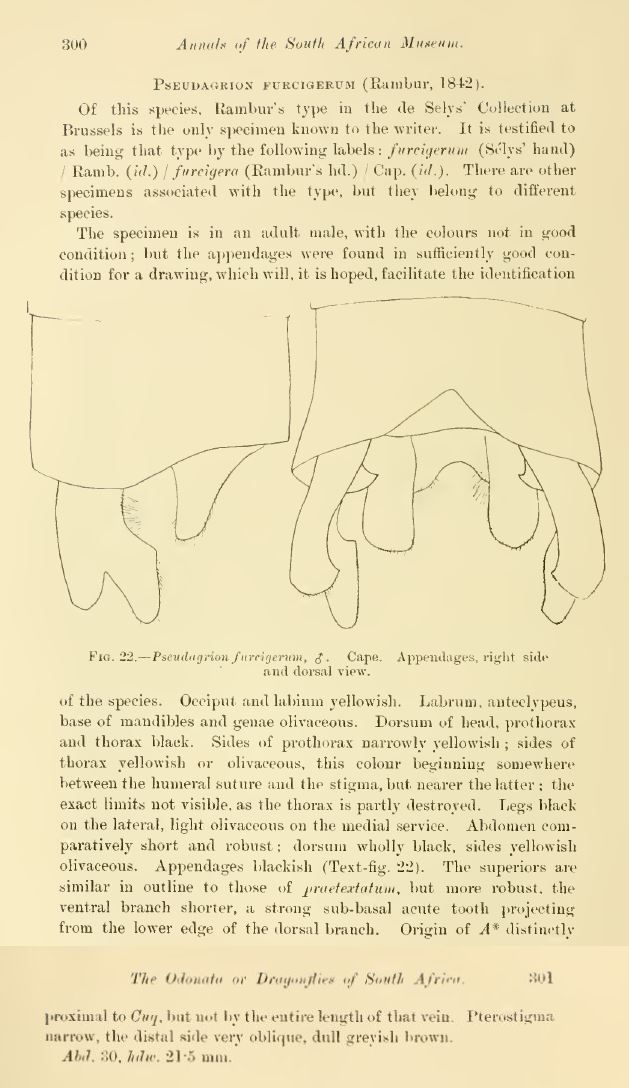
Description of Pseudagrion furcigerum by Friedrich Ris
