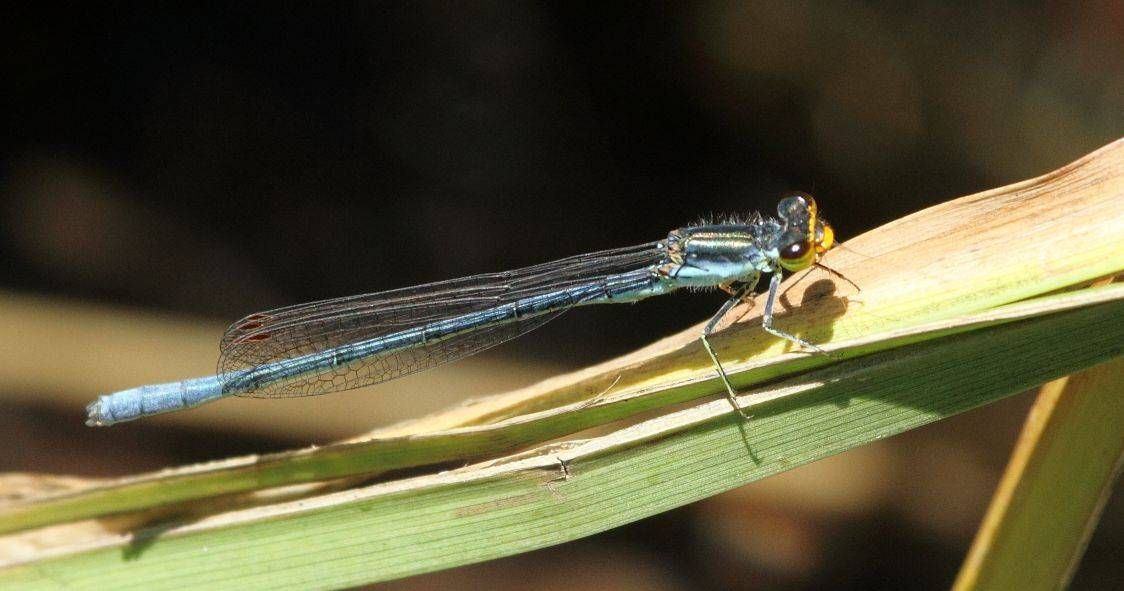
- Male

Conservation status
- Least Concern (IUCN 3.1)

Scientific classification
- Kingdom: Animalia
- Phylum: Arthropoda
- Clade: Pancrustacea
- Class: Insecta
- Order: Odonata
- Suborder: Zygoptera
- Family: Coenagrionidae
- Genus: Pseudagrion
- Species: P. caffrum

Binomial name
- Pseudagrion caffrum (Burmeister, 1839)

= Pseudagrion caffrum =

Species of damselfly

Pseudagrion caffrum, the springwater sprite is a species of damselfly in the family Coenagrionidae. It is found in Lesotho, South Africa and Eswatini. Its natural habitats include montane streams with grassy banks.

A medium-sized damselfly (length 31–3 mm; wingspan 39–47 mm). The face is black and yellow and it lacks post-ocular spots. The eyes are black above and yellow below. The synthorax is dark blue above and the sides are pale, pruinescent blue. The abdomen is dark blue above and yellow green below, ageing to pruinescent grey.

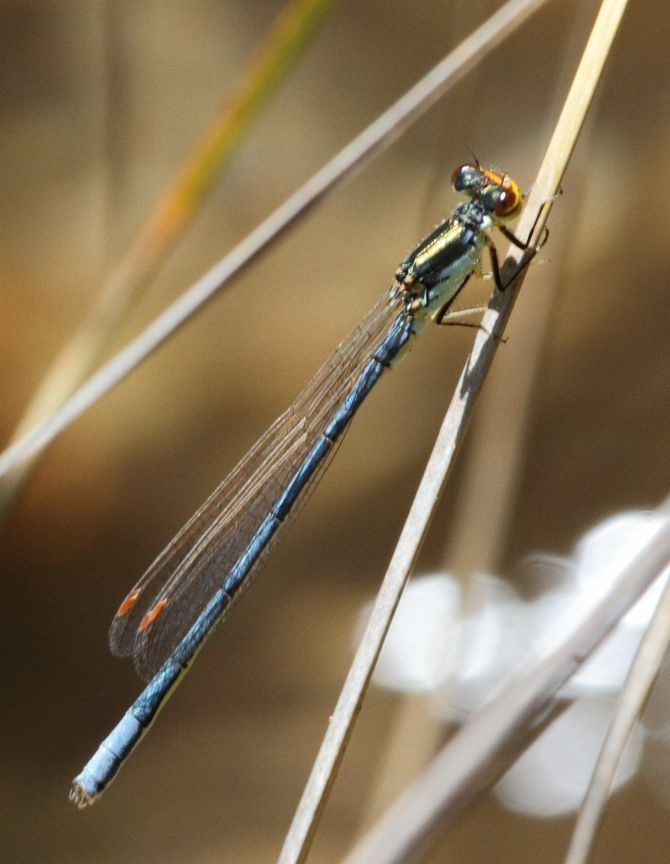
Male

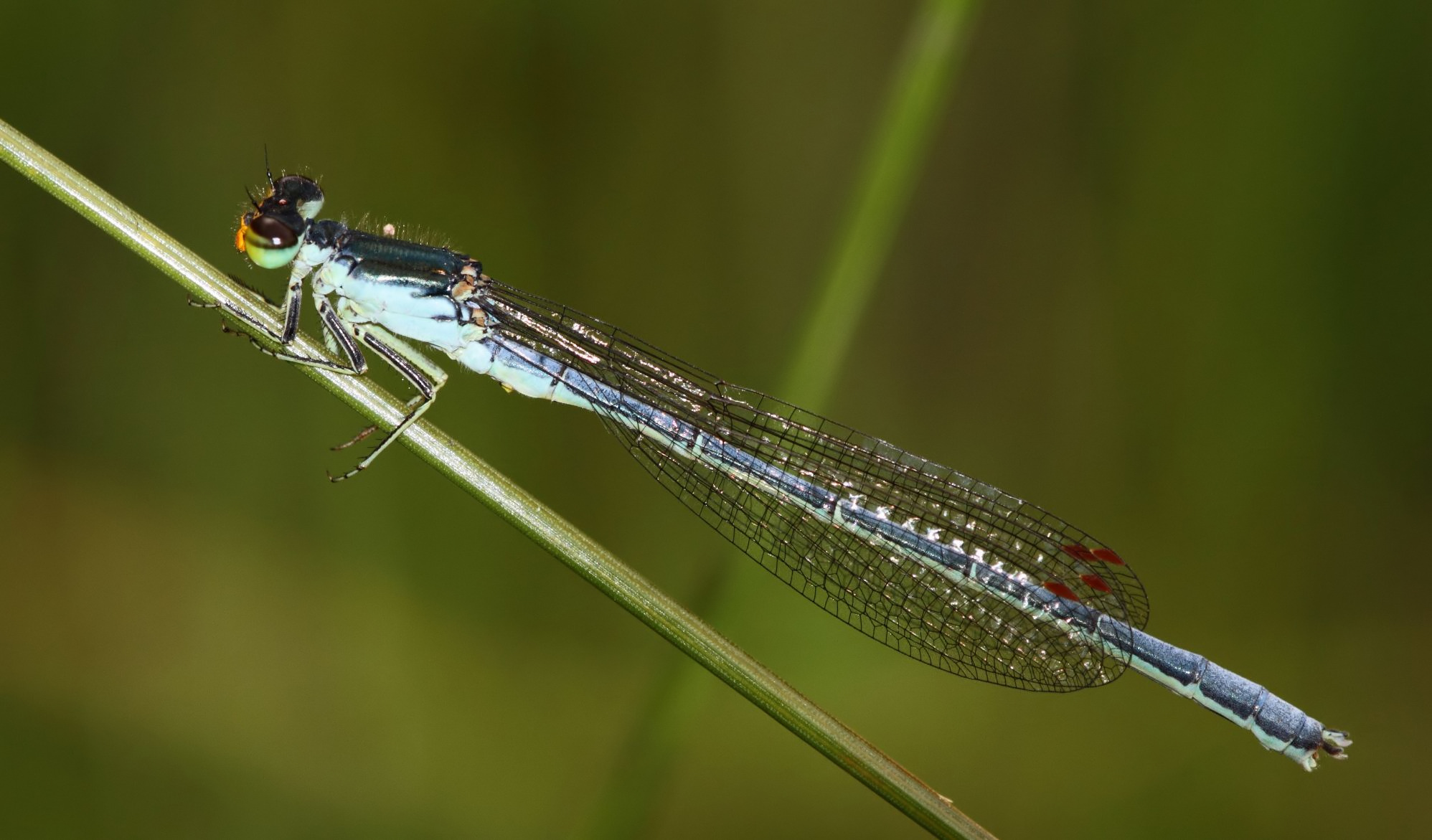
Male

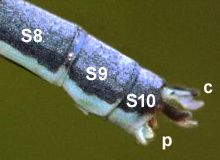
Male abdomen detail

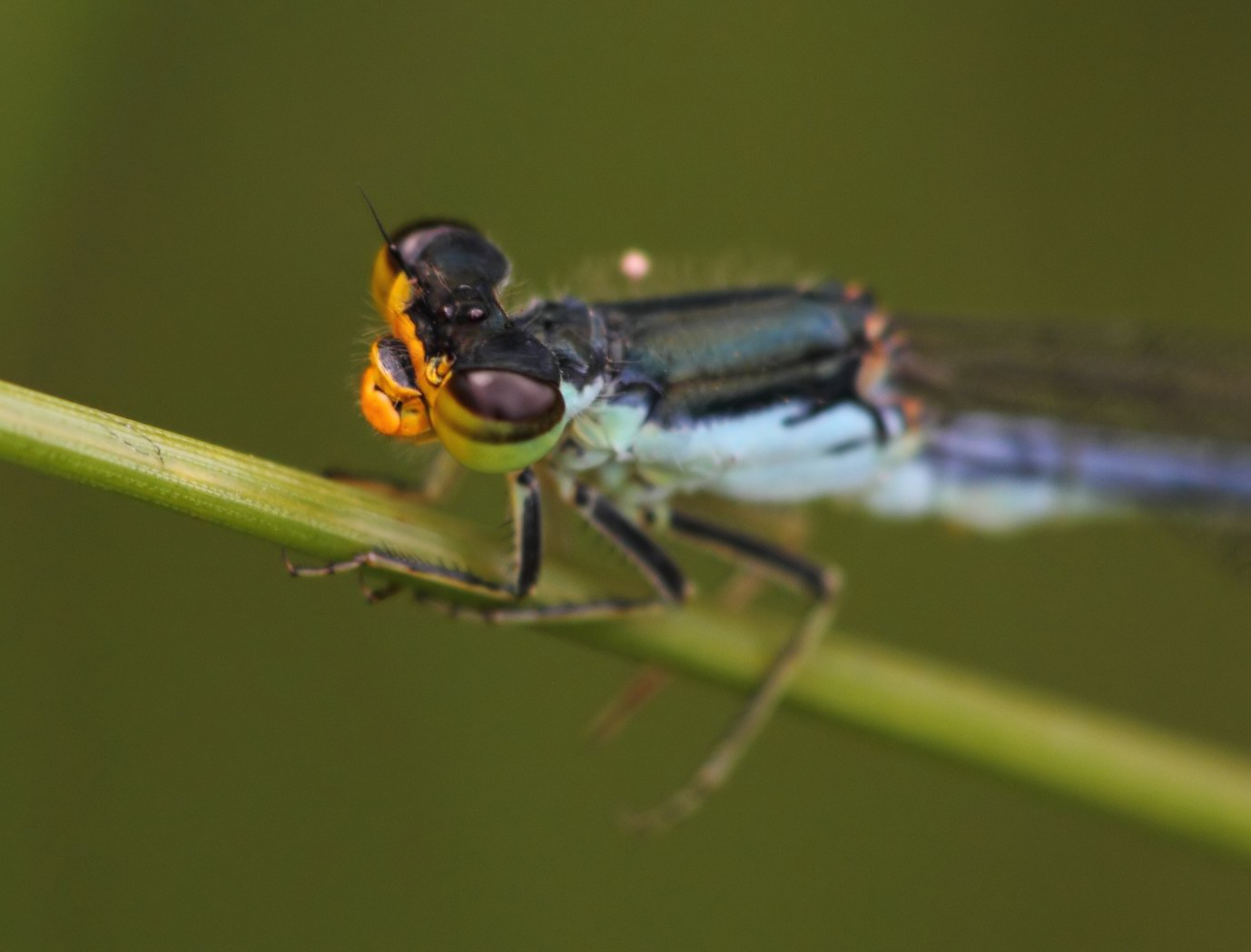
Male head and thorax

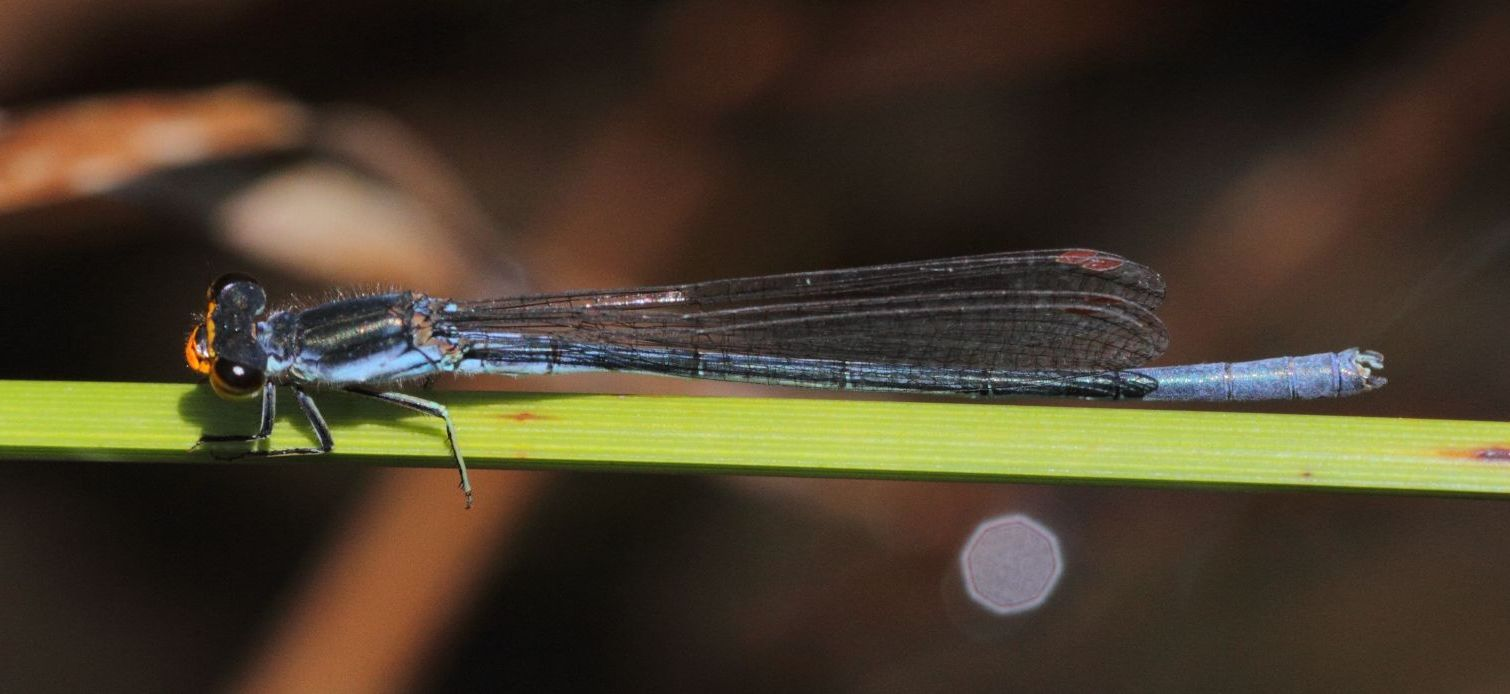
Male

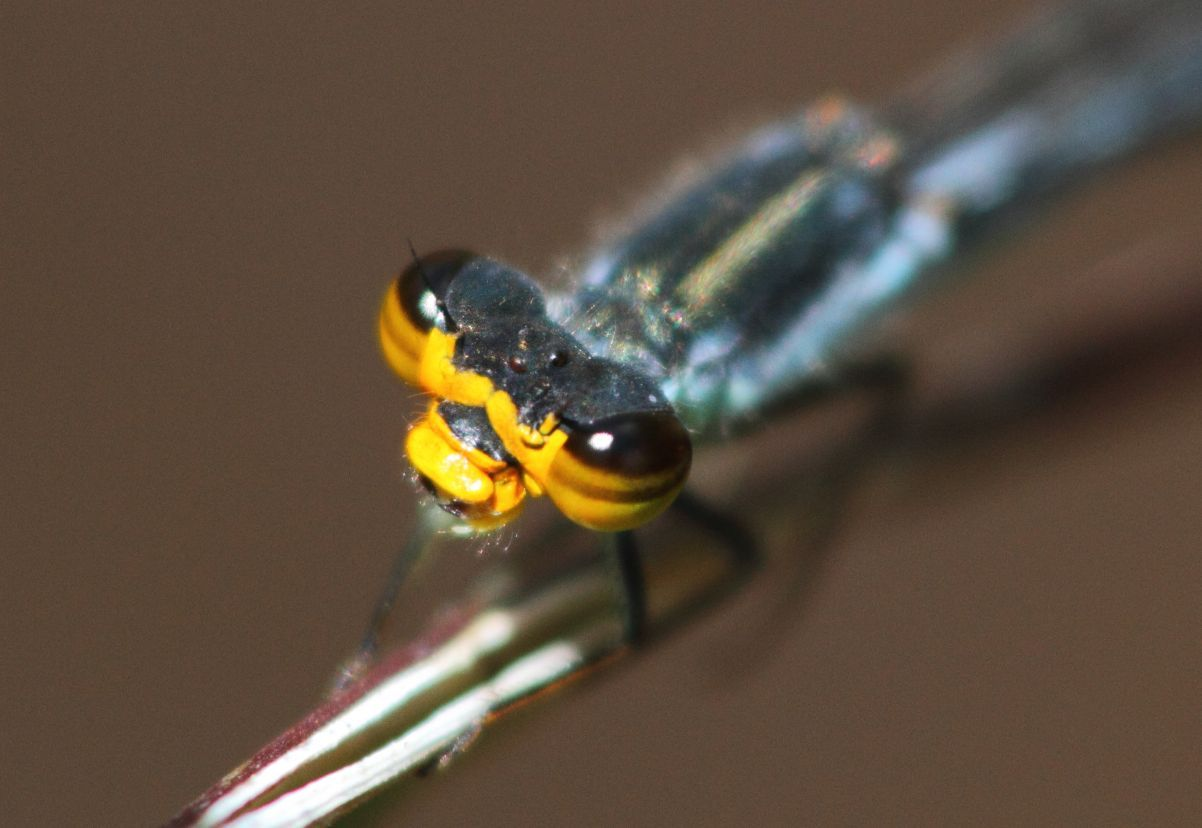
Male face

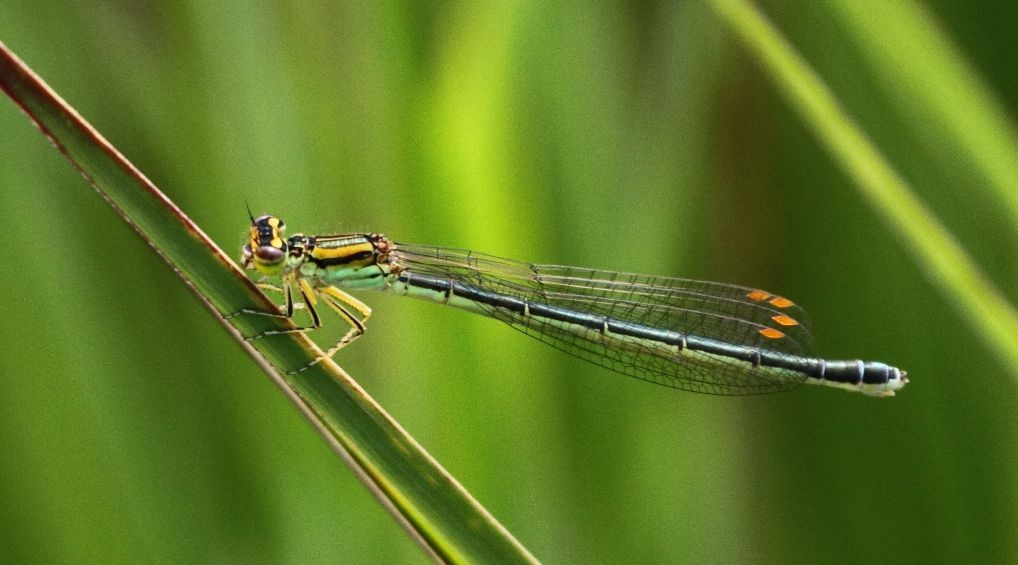
Female

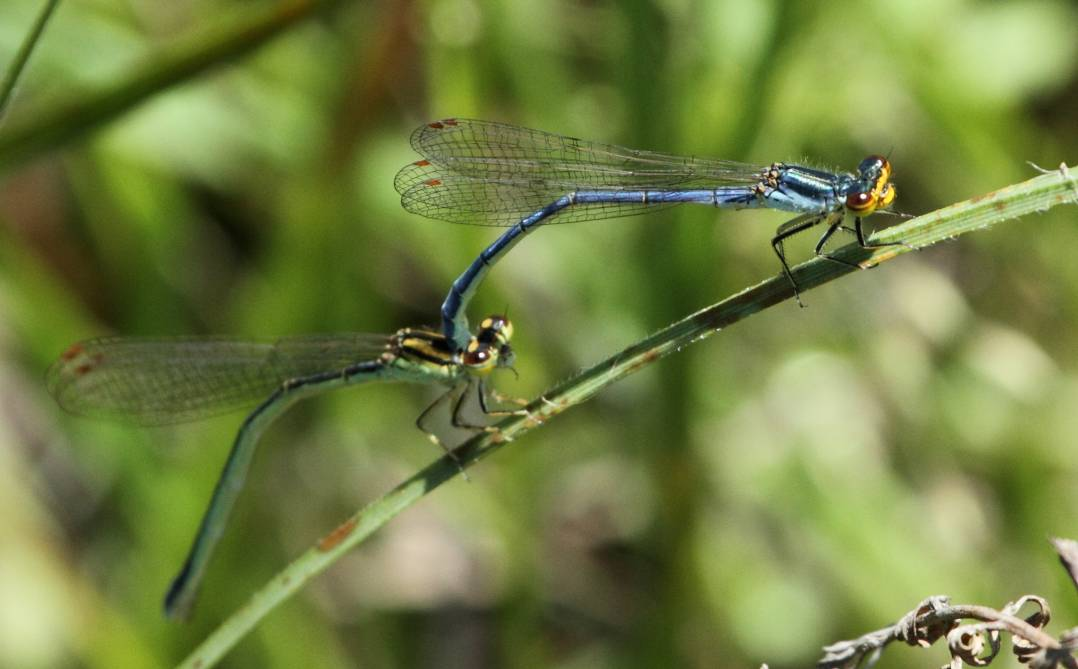
Pair
