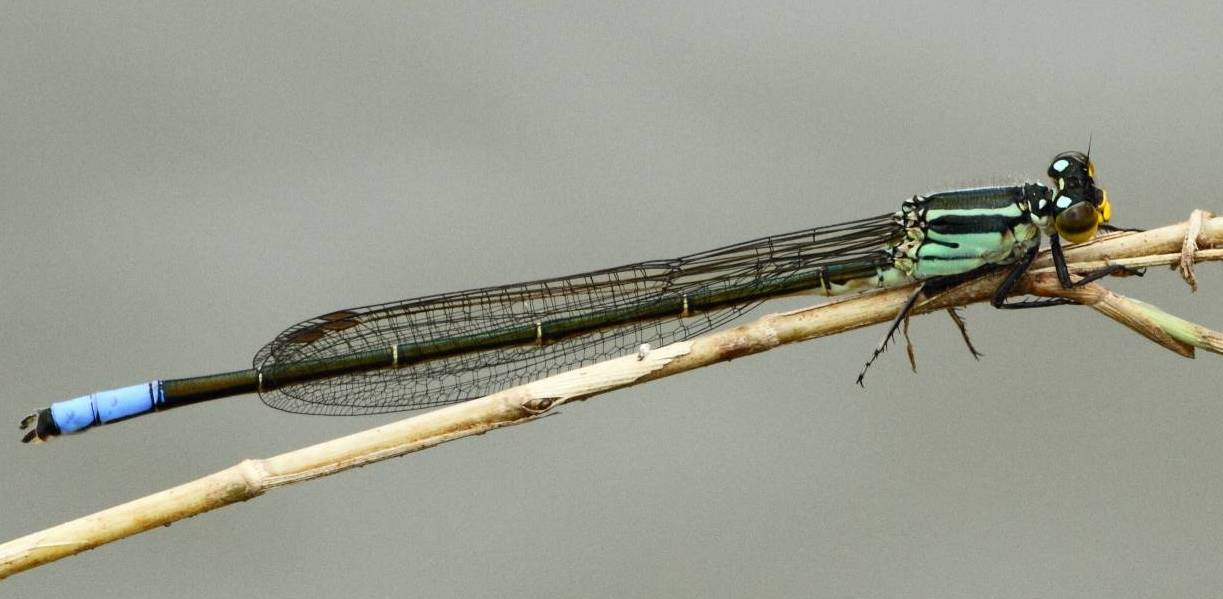
- Male

Conservation status
- Least Concern (IUCN 3.1)

Scientific classification
- Kingdom: Animalia
- Phylum: Arthropoda
- Clade: Pancrustacea
- Class: Insecta
- Order: Odonata
- Suborder: Zygoptera
- Family: Coenagrionidae
- Genus: Pseudagrion
- Species: P. gamblesi

Binomial name
- Pseudagrion gamblesi Pinhey, 1978

= Pseudagrion gamblesi =

Species of damselfly

Pseudagrion gamblesi is a species of damselfly in the family Coenagrionidae. It is found in Angola, Botswana, Ethiopia, Kenya, Malawi, South Africa, Tanzania, Uganda, Zambia, Zimbabwe, and possibly Burundi. Its natural habitats are subtropical or tropical streams and rivers with reeds.
