= A. victoria =

A. victoria may refer to:

- Agriocnemis victoria, a damselfly species found in Africa
- Aequorea victoria, the crystal jelly, a bioluminescent hydrozoan jellyfish species found off the west coast of North America

== See also ==
- Victoria (disambiguation)
