= Agriocnemis sania =

Conservation status
- Least Concern (IUCN 3.1)

Scientific classification
- Kingdom: Animalia
- Phylum: Arthropoda
- Clade: Pancrustacea
- Class: Insecta
- Order: Odonata
- Suborder: Zygoptera
- Family: Coenagrionidae
- Genus: Agriocnemis
- Species: A. sania

Binomial name
- Agriocnemis sania Nielsen, 1959

Species of damselfly

Agriocnemis sania, commonly known as the Nile Wisp, is a species of damselfly in the family Coenagrionidae. Its natural habitats are dry savanna, subtropical or tropical dry shrubland, freshwater springs, saline lakes, intermittent saline lakes, and saline marshes.

== Taxonomy ==
The species was first named by Cesare Nielsen in 1959. However, for several decades, there was significant taxonomic confusion regarding its relationship to the widely distributed Asian species Agriocnemis pygmaea.

Agriocnemis sania was established as a distinct species in 1974 by H. Dumont, separated from A. pygmaea by the specific morphology of the male anal appendages and the female prothorax. Dumont’s work was critical in confirming that previous records of Agriocnemis in the Levant referred to A. sania rather than its Asian relatives.

== Description ==
The nile wisp is characterized by its diminutive size, with a total body length typically ranging between 18–22 mm and hindwing ranging between 9–11 mm.

♂: Predominantly black on the dorsal surface with bright apple-green or blue-green markings on the thorax. The terminal segments of the abdomen (segments 8, 9, and 10) are typically bright orange or reddish-orange, which serves as a key field identification mark.

♀: This species exhibits polymorphism. Andromorph females mimic the male coloration, while heteromorph (f. rufescent) females are a striking bright orange or salmon color when young, darkening to olive-brown as they age.

The male superior anal appendages (cerci) are longer than the inferior appendages (paraprocts) and possess a distinct internal tooth, a feature which separates it from A. pygmaea.

== Ecology ==
=== Distribution ===
It is found in Israel (notably the Hula Valley and coastal plains), Jordan, Egypt, Sudan, Ethiopia, Kenya, and Libya.

=== Habitat ===
A. sania is highly specialized in its habitat requirements. It prefers stagnant or very slow-moving waters with extremely dense, lush vegetation—specifically grasses and sedges. Because of its tiny size and weak flight, it rarely leaves the protective cover of these plants. This species is often found in micro-habitats where larger damselflies cannot easily maneuver.

== Conservation Status ==
In the Mediterranean region, A. sania is considered rare and highly vulnerable to habitat loss. In Israel, the drainage of the Hula swamps in the 1950s led to a massive decline in their population. While they have been rediscovered in specific protected enclaves and the Golan Heights, they remain a priority species for wetland conservation in the arid Middle East.
