= Agriocnemis kunjina =

Pilbara wisp

Conservation status
- Vulnerable (IUCN 3.1)

Scientific classification
- Kingdom: Animalia
- Phylum: Arthropoda
- Clade: Pancrustacea
- Class: Insecta
- Order: Odonata
- Suborder: Zygoptera
- Family: Coenagrionidae
- Genus: Agriocnemis
- Species: A. kunjina

Binomial name
- Agriocnemis kunjina Watson, 1969

Species of damselfly

Agriocnemis kunjina is a species of Australian damselfly in the family Coenagrionidae, commonly known as a Pilbara wisp. It is a small damselfly, endemic to the Pilbara region in Western Australia, where it inhabits still and flowing water.

== Etymology ==
In 1969, Tony Watson named this species kunjina after Kunjina Spring in Hammersley Range, Western Australia, where specimens of this damselfly were collected.

== Gallery ==
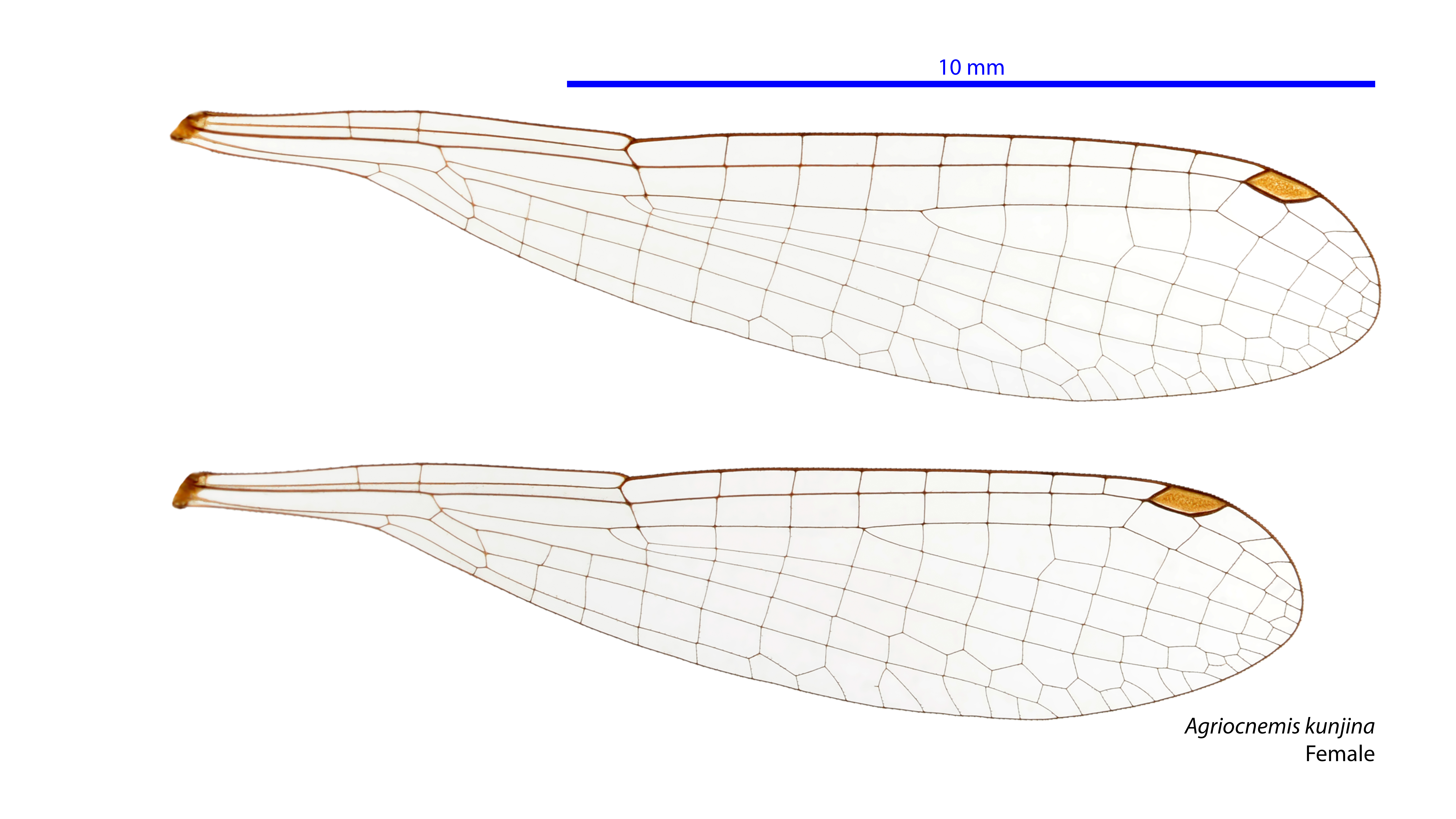
Female wings

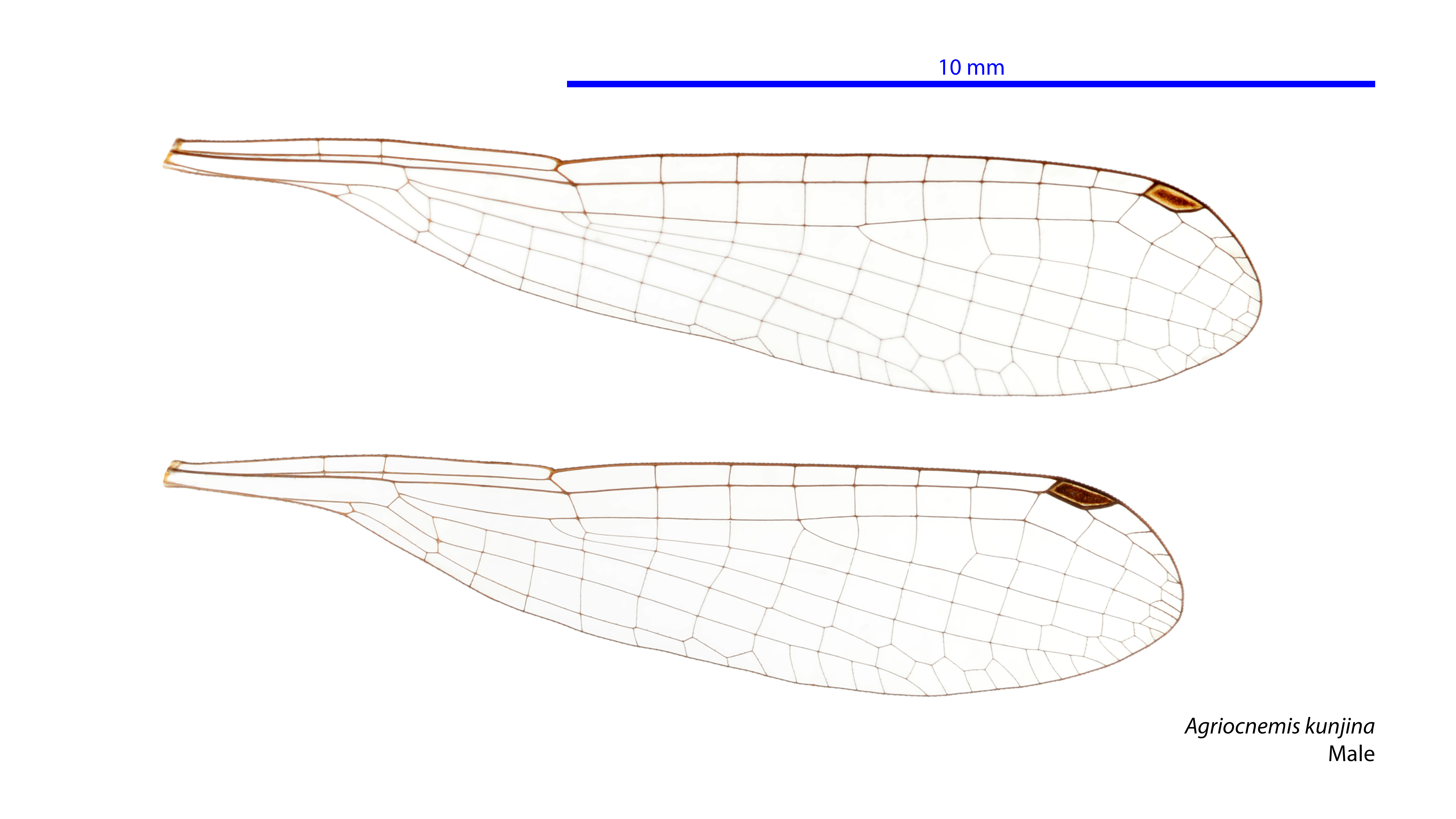
Male wings

== See also ==
- List of Odonata species of Australia
