= Agriocnemis maclachlani =

Conservation status
- Least Concern (IUCN 3.1)

Scientific classification
- Kingdom: Animalia
- Phylum: Arthropoda
- Class: Insecta
- Order: Odonata
- Suborder: Zygoptera
- Family: Coenagrionidae
- Genus: Agriocnemis
- Species: A. maclachlani

Binomial name
- Agriocnemis maclachlani Selys, 1877

Species of damselfly

Agriocnemis maclachlani is a species of damselfly in the family Coenagrionidae. It is found in Cameroon, the Republic of the Congo, Ivory Coast, Equatorial Guinea, Gabon, Gambia, Ghana, Guinea, Liberia, Nigeria, Senegal, Sierra Leone, and Uganda. Its natural habitats are subtropical or tropical moist lowland forests, freshwater lakes, intermittent freshwater lakes, freshwater marshes, and intermittent freshwater marshes.
