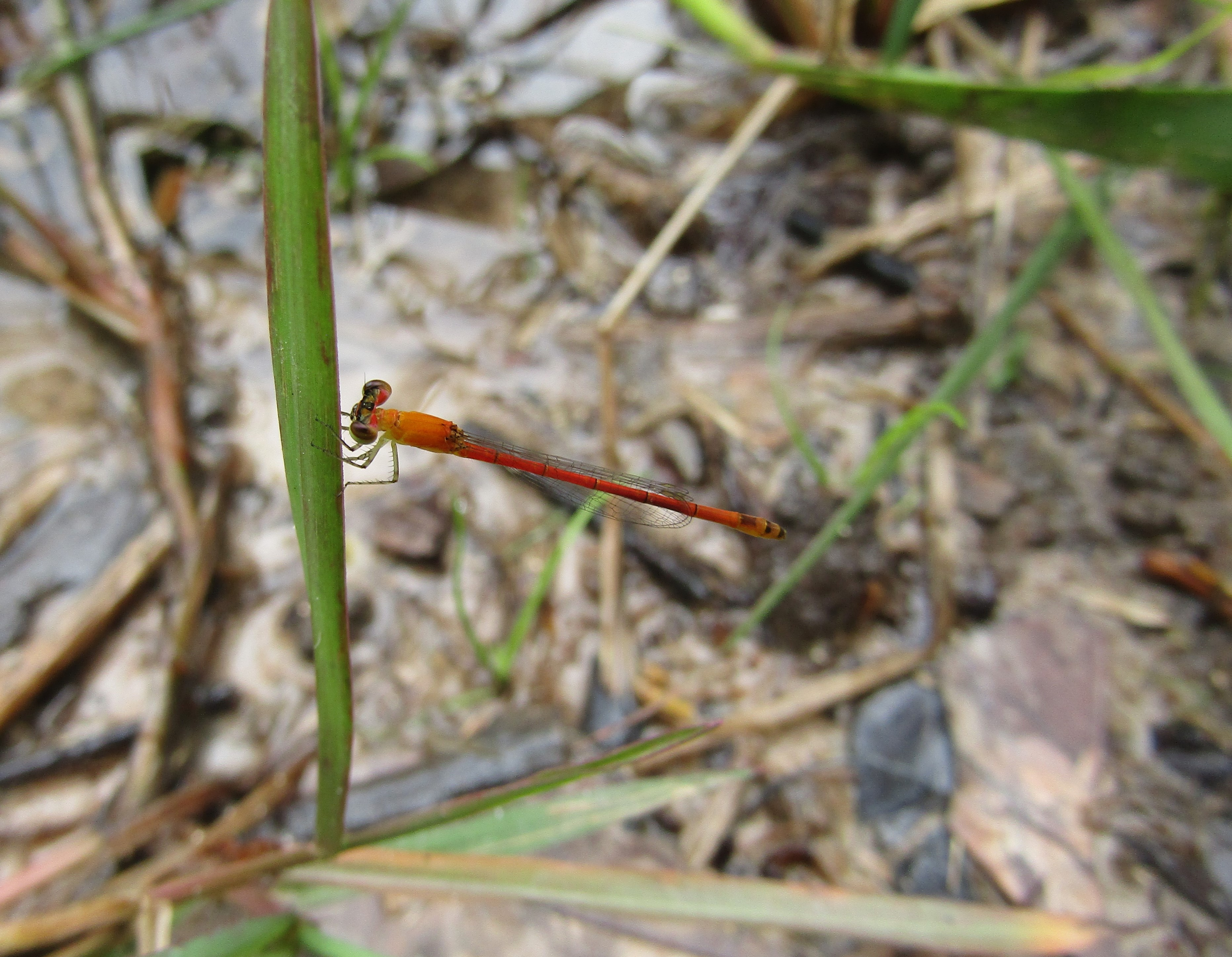
- Female

Scientific classification
- Domain: Eukaryota
- Kingdom: Animalia
- Phylum: Arthropoda
- Class: Insecta
- Order: Odonata
- Suborder: Zygoptera
- Family: Coenagrionidae
- Genus: Agriocnemis
- Species: A. minima

Binomial name
- Agriocnemis minima Selys, 1877

= Agriocnemis minima =

Species of damselfly

Agriocnemis minima is a species of damselfly in the family Coenagrionidae. It is distributed across Indochina and can be found in Cambodia, Thailand and Singapore. It breeds in marshes and wet habitats.
