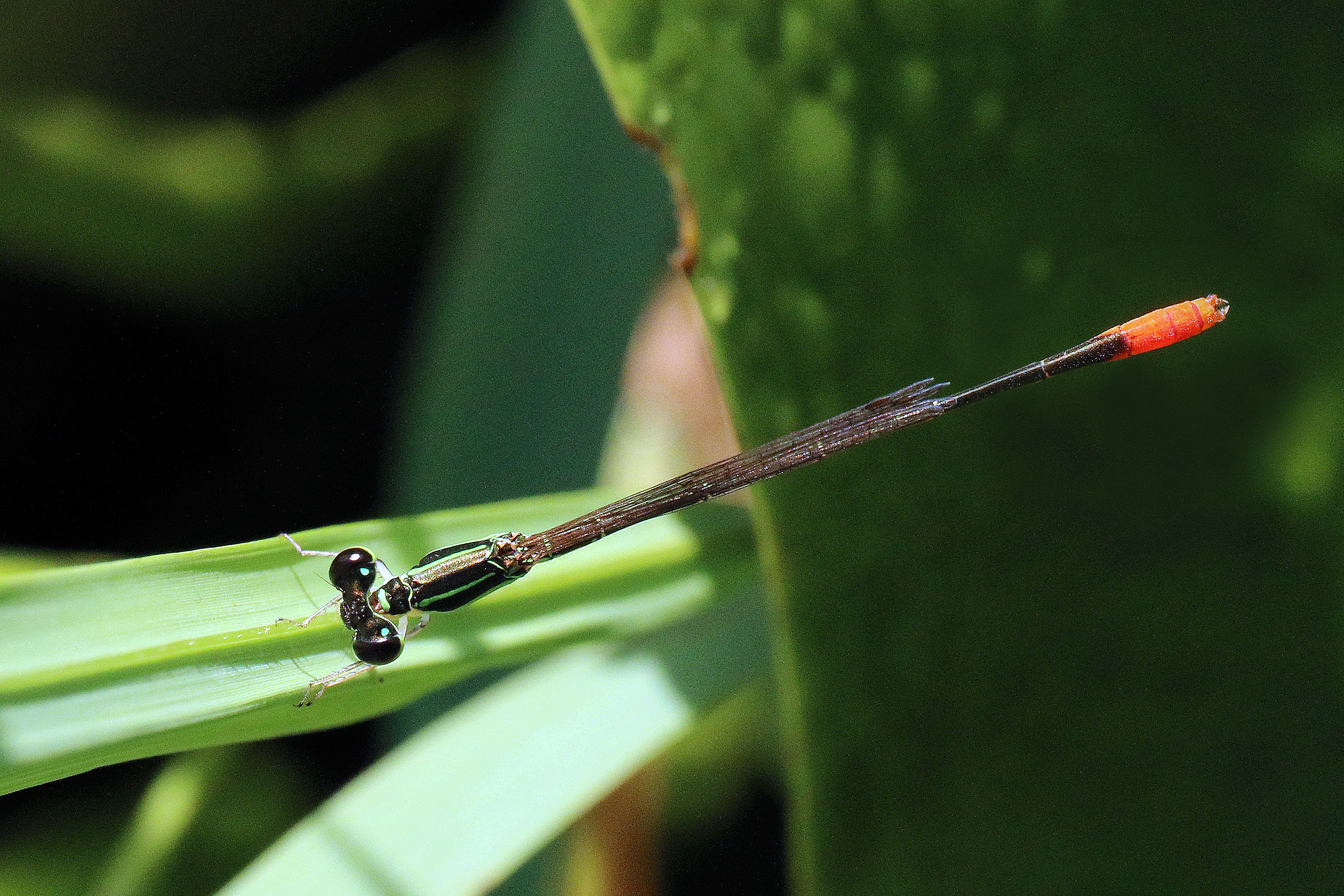
- Kenelap Oxbow Lake; Sabah, Borneo

Conservation status
- Least Concern (IUCN 3.1)

Scientific classification
- Kingdom: Animalia
- Phylum: Arthropoda
- Clade: Pancrustacea
- Class: Insecta
- Order: Odonata
- Suborder: Zygoptera
- Family: Coenagrionidae
- Genus: Agriocnemis
- Species: A. femina

Binomial name
- Agriocnemis femina (Brauer, 1868)

= Agriocnemis femina =

Variable wisp

Species of damselfly

Agriocnemis femina, the variable wisp or pinhead wisp, is a species of damselfly in the family Coenagrionidae. It is a small damselfly; mature males have a white pruinescence over their body, and a dark tail. It is found from India, through South-east Asia to islands in the Pacific. where it inhabits pools and stagnant water.

== Gallery ==
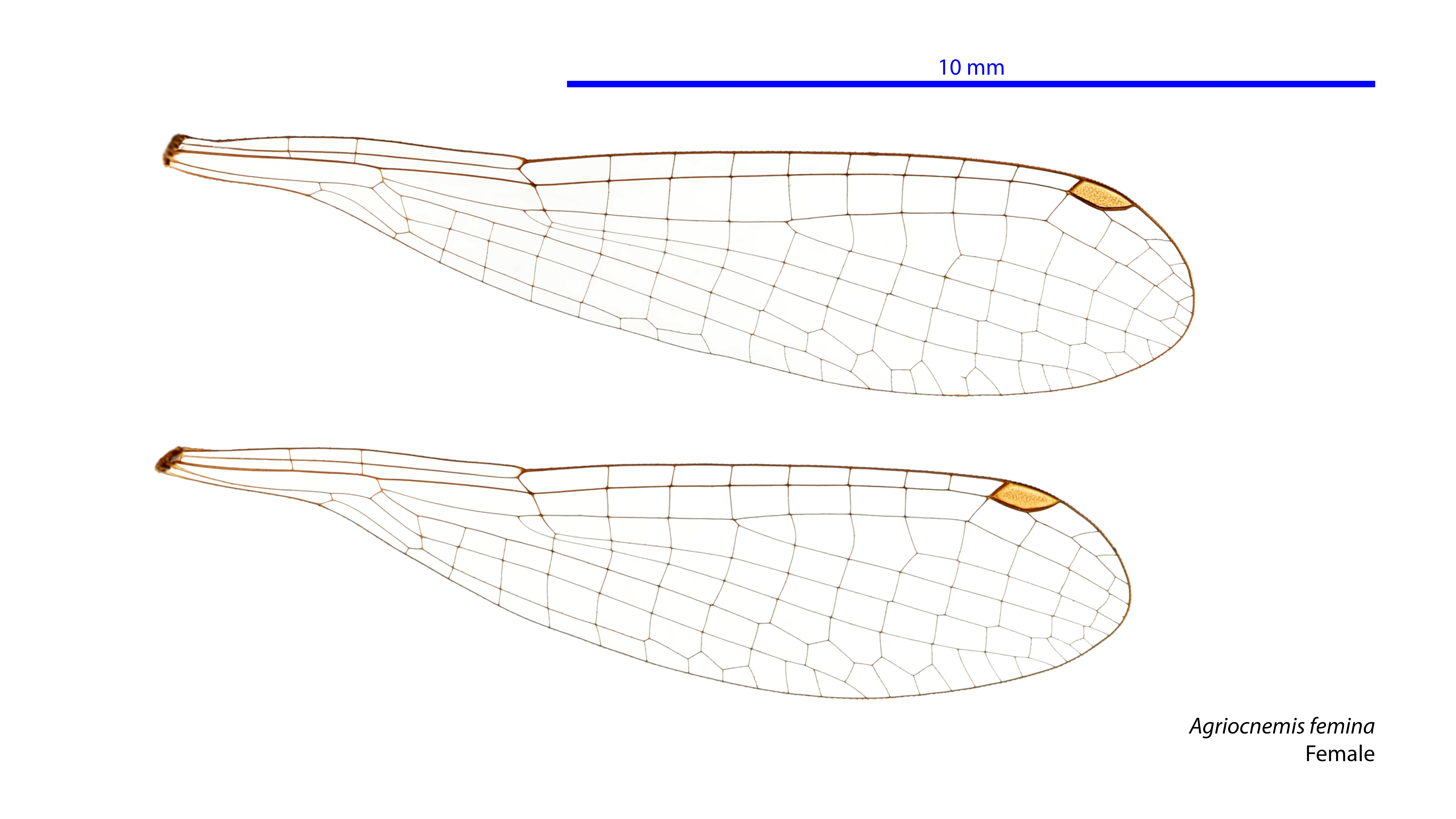
Female wings

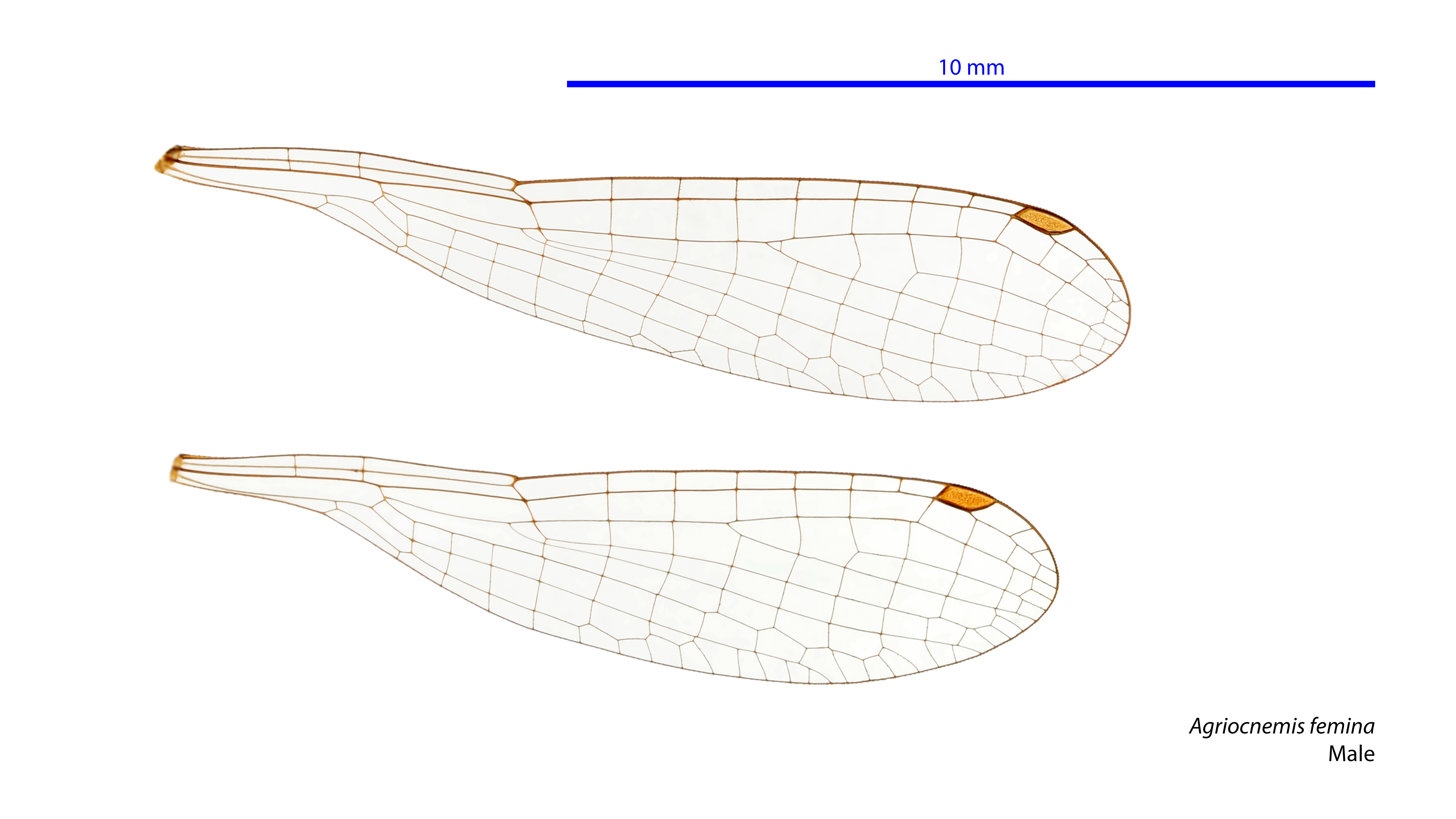
Male wings
