= Agriocnemis dobsoni =

Tropical wisp

Conservation status
- Near Threatened (IUCN 3.1)

Scientific classification
- Kingdom: Animalia
- Phylum: Arthropoda
- Clade: Pancrustacea
- Class: Insecta
- Order: Odonata
- Suborder: Zygoptera
- Family: Coenagrionidae
- Genus: Agriocnemis
- Species: A. dobsoni

Binomial name
- Agriocnemis dobsoni Fraser, 1954

Species of damselfly

Agriocnemis dobsoni is a species of damselfly in the family Coenagrionidae, commonly known as a tropical wisp. It is a small damselfly; mature males have a white pruinescence over their body, and a dark end to their tail. It is endemic to north-eastern Australia, where it inhabits pools and swamps.

== Etymology ==
The genus name Agriocnemis is derived from two Greek words: agrion or ἄγριος, meaning wild, and cnemis or κνημίς, meaning legging. Agrion was the name given in 1775 by Johan Fabricius for all damselflies. cnemis is commonly used for many damselflies in the family Coenagrionidae.

In 1954, F. C. Fraser named this species dobsoni, an eponym in acknowledgement of a specimen collected by Roderick Dobson.

== Gallery ==
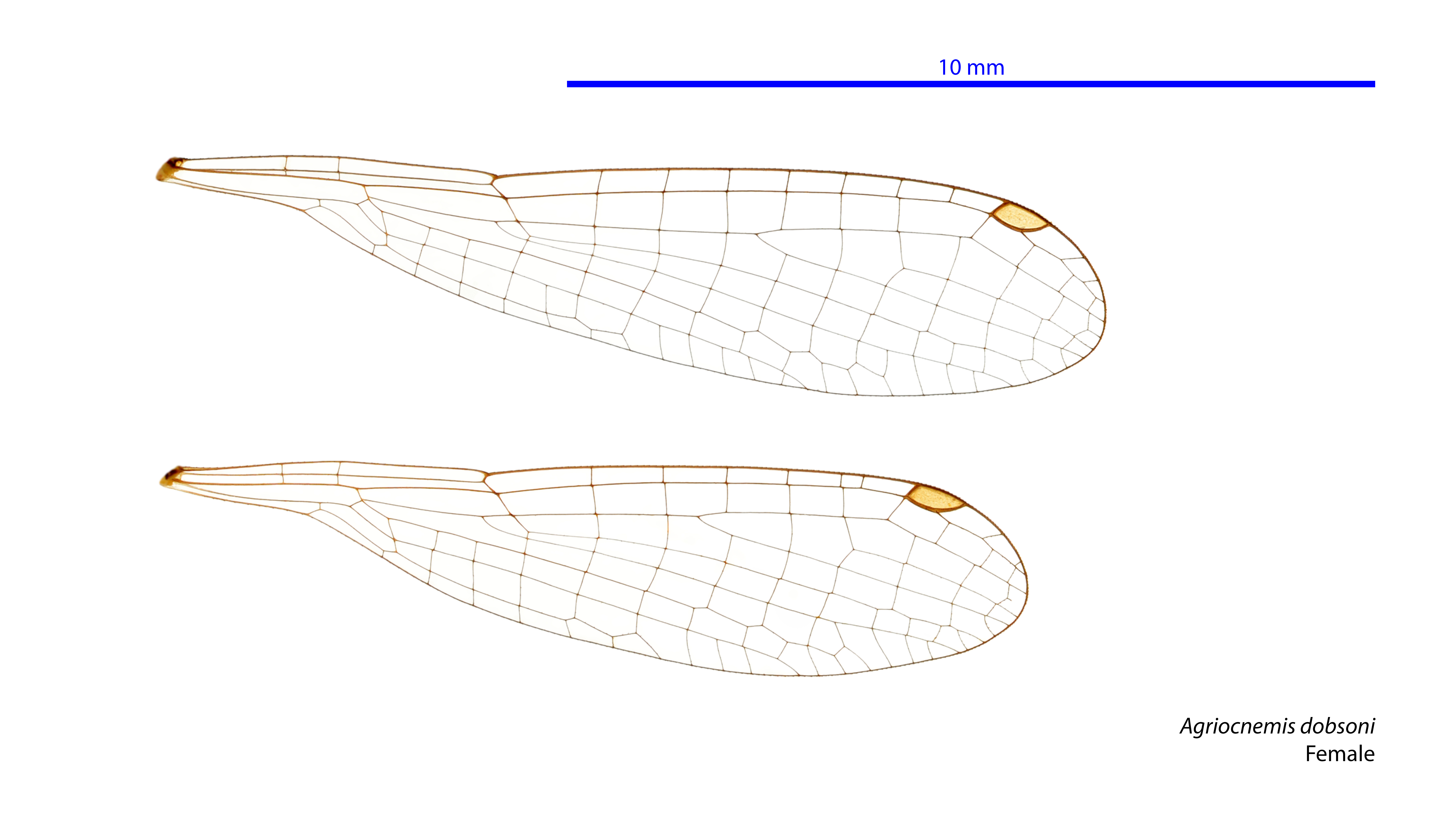
Female wings

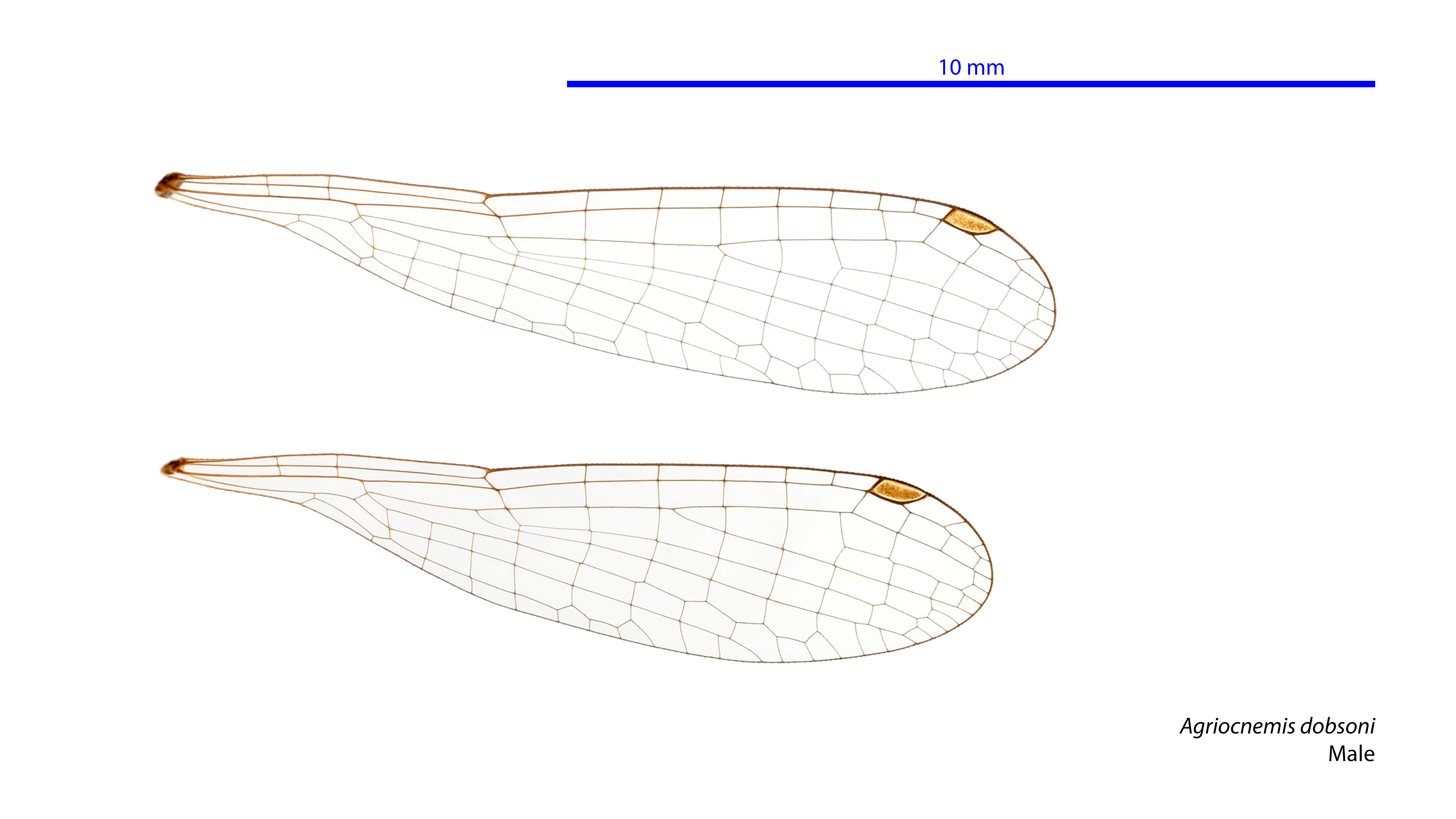
Male wings

== See also ==
- List of Odonata species of Australia
