= Agriocnemis thoracalis =

Scientific classification
- Kingdom: Animalia
- Phylum: Arthropoda
- Clade: Pancrustacea
- Class: Insecta
- Order: Odonata
- Suborder: Zygoptera
- Family: Coenagrionidae
- Genus: Agriocnemis
- Species: A. thoracalis

Binomial name
- Agriocnemis thoracalis Sjöstedt, 1917

Species of damselfly

Agriocnemis thoracalis is a species of damselfly in the family Coenagrionidae,

There is little known about this species of damselfly. A note in the Australian Faunal Directory says: the holotype lacks the last four abdominal segments and the identity of the species is therefore uncertain. The holotype, a male specimen, is in the NHRM (Naturhistoriska Rijkmuseet, Sweden). It was collected from Cape York Peninsula, Queensland, Australia, during Eric Mjöberg's Swedish scientific expedition to Australia, 1910–1913, and described by Bror Yngve Sjöstedt in 1917.

== Etymology ==
The genus name Agriocnemis is derived from two Greek words: agrion or ἄγριος, meaning wild, and cnemis or κνημίς, meaning legging. Agrion was the name given in 1775 by Johan Fabricius for all damselflies. cnemis is commonly used for many damselflies in the family Coenagrionidae.

The species name thoracalis is derived from the Greek θώραξ (thōrax, "thorax" or "chest") and the Latin suffix -alis ("relating to"), referring to the shape of the thorax.
