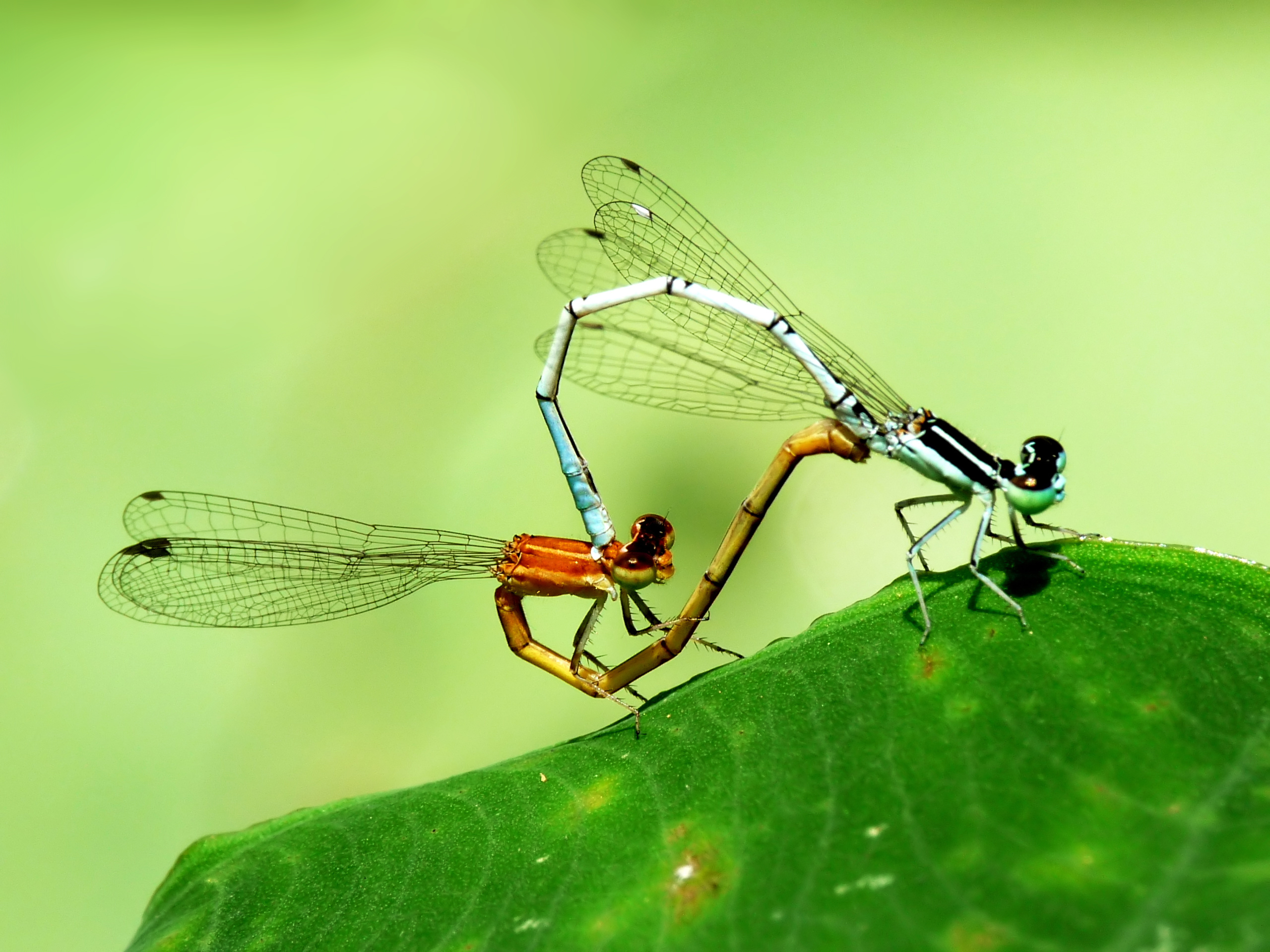
- Agriocnemis pieris

Scientific classification
- Kingdom: Animalia
- Phylum: Arthropoda
- Clade: Pancrustacea
- Class: Insecta
- Order: Odonata
- Suborder: Zygoptera
- Family: Coenagrionidae
- Genus: Agriocnemis; Selys, 1877
- Probable distribution of Agriocnemis

= Agriocnemis =

Genus of damselflies

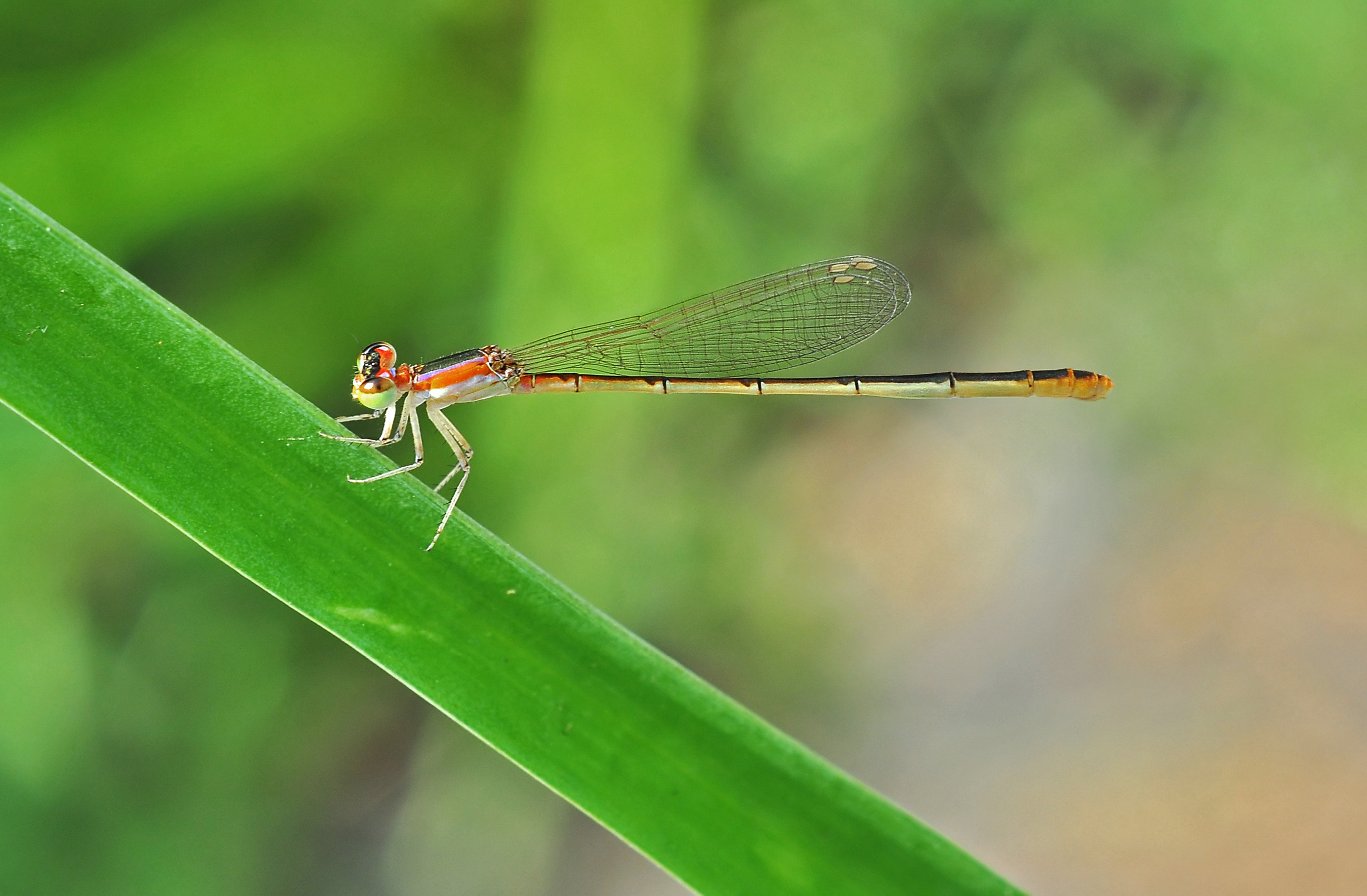
Agriocnemis pygmaea, female at West Bengal, India

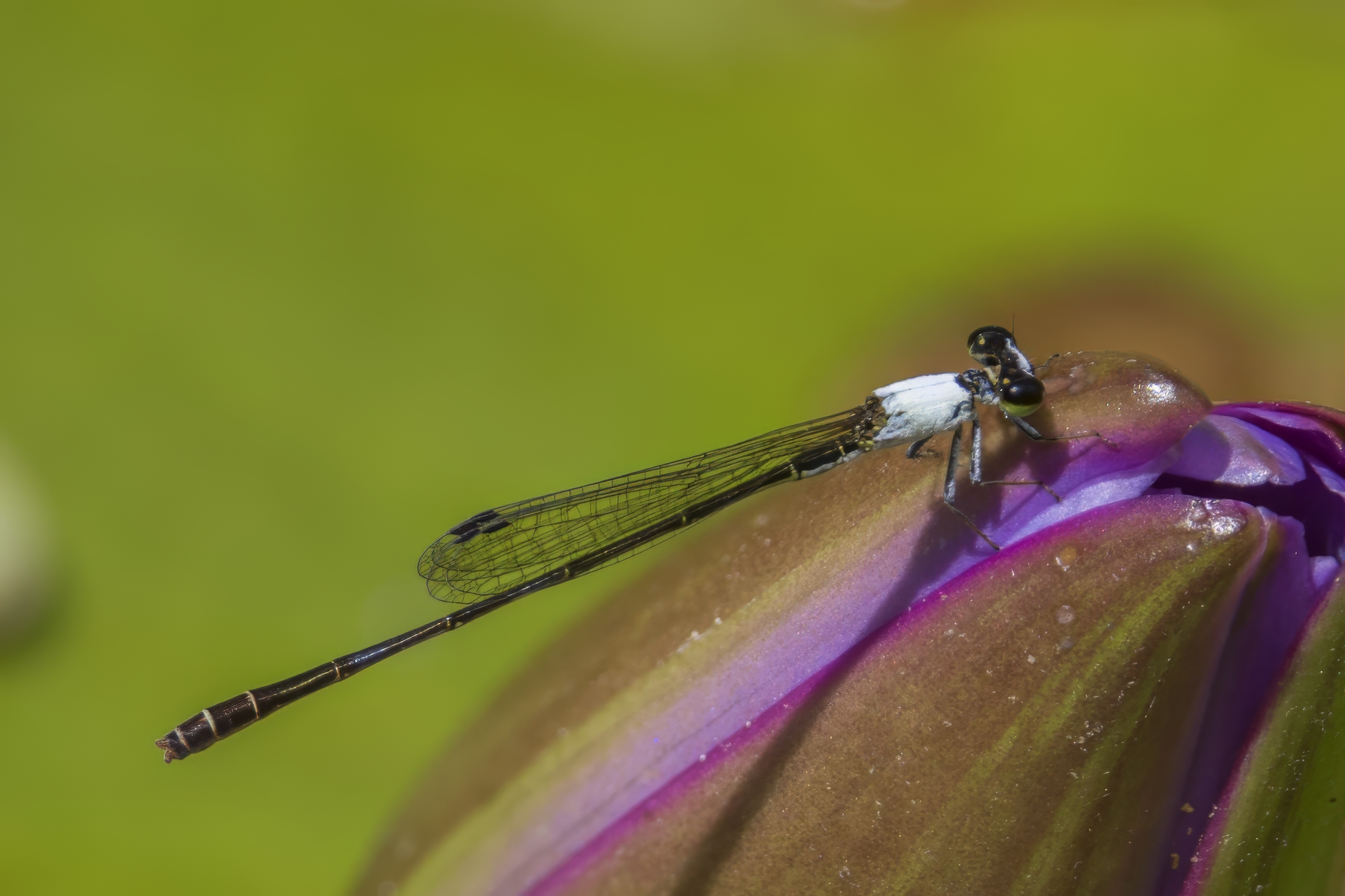
Agriocnemis exsudans mature male, Cook Islands

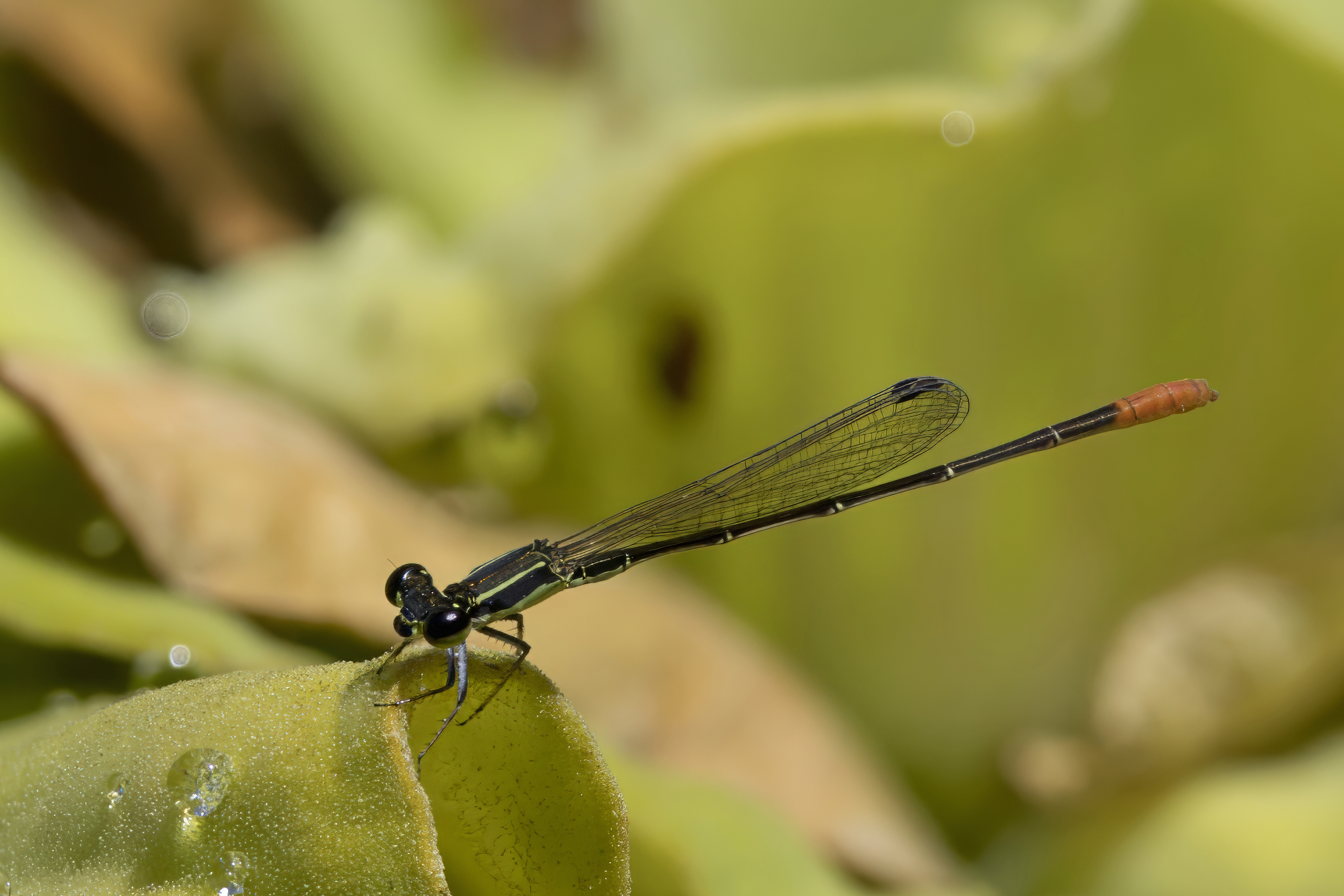
Agriocnemis exsudans immature male, Cook Islands

Agriocnemis is a genus of damselfly in the family Coenagrionidae. Agriocnemis is distributed widely across Africa, South-east Asia, Indonesia, Australia and islands in the Pacific.They are small insects, commonly known as wisps.

== Etymology ==
The genus name Agriocnemis is derived from two Greek words: agrion or ἄγριος, meaning wild, and cnemis or κνημίς, meaning legging. Agrion was the name given in 1775 by Johan Fabricius for all damselflies. cnemis is commonly used for many damselflies in the family Coenagrionidae.

== Species ==
The genus Agriocnemis includes the following species:

- Agriocnemis aderces Lieftinck, 1932
- Agriocnemis alcyone Laidlaw, 1931
- Agriocnemis angolense Longfield, 1947
- Agriocnemis angustirami Pinhey, 1974
- Agriocnemis argentea Tillyard, 1906 - silver wisp
- Agriocnemis bumhilli Kipping, Martens & Suhling, 2012
- Agriocnemis canuango Dijkstra, 2015
- Agriocnemis carmelita Selys, 1877
- Agriocnemis clauseni Fraser, 1922
- Agriocnemis dabreui Fraser, 1919
- Agriocnemis dobsoni Fraser, 1954 - tropical wisp
- Agriocnemis exilis Selys, 1872 - little wisp
- Agriocnemis exsudans Selys, 1877
- Agriocnemis falcifera Pinhey, 1959 - white-masked wisp
- Agriocnemis femina (Brauer, 1868) - pinhead wisp
- Agriocnemis forcipata Le Roi, 1915
- Agriocnemis gratiosa Gerstäcker, 1891 - gracious wisp
- Agriocnemis interrupta Fraser, 1927
- Agriocnemis inversa Karsch, 1899
- Agriocnemis kalinga Nair & Subramanian, 2014
- Agriocnemis keralensis Peters, 1981
- Agriocnemis kunjina Watson, 1974 - Pilbara wisp
- Agriocnemis lacteola Selys, 1877
- Agriocnemis lepida Seehausen, 2020
- Agriocnemis luteola Navás, 1936
- Agriocnemis maclachlani Selys, 1877
- Agriocnemis merina Lieftinck, 1965
- Agriocnemis minima Selys, 1877
- Agriocnemis naia Fraser, 1923
- Agriocnemis nana Laidlaw, 1914
- Agriocnemis palaeforma Pinhey, 1959
- Agriocnemis pieli Navás, 1933
- Agriocnemis pieris Laidlaw, 1919
- Agriocnemis pinheyi Balinsky, 1963 - Pinhey's wisp
- Agriocnemis pygmaea (Rambur, 1842) - pygmy wisp
- Agriocnemis ruberrima Balinsky, 1961
- Agriocnemis rubricauda Tillyard, 1913 - red-rumped wisp
- Agriocnemis salomonis Lieftinck, 1949
- Agriocnemis sania Nielsen, 1959
- Agriocnemis splendidissima Laidlaw, 1919
- Agriocnemis thoracalis Sjöstedt, 1917
- Agriocnemis toto Dijkstra, 2015
- Agriocnemis victoria Fraser, 1928
- Agriocnemis zerafica Le Roi, 1915
