= Agriocnemis zerafica =

Conservation status
- Least Concern (IUCN 3.1)

Scientific classification
- Kingdom: Animalia
- Phylum: Arthropoda
- Clade: Pancrustacea
- Class: Insecta
- Order: Odonata
- Suborder: Zygoptera
- Family: Coenagrionidae
- Genus: Agriocnemis
- Species: A. zerafica

Binomial name
- Agriocnemis zerafica Le Roi, 1915

Species of damselfly

Agriocnemis zerafica is a species of damselfly in the family Coenagrionidae. It is native to Africa, where it is widespread across the central and western nations of the continent. It is known by the common name Sahel wisp.

This species occurs in swamps and pools in dry regions. There are no major threats but it may be affected by pollution and habitat loss to agriculture and development.
