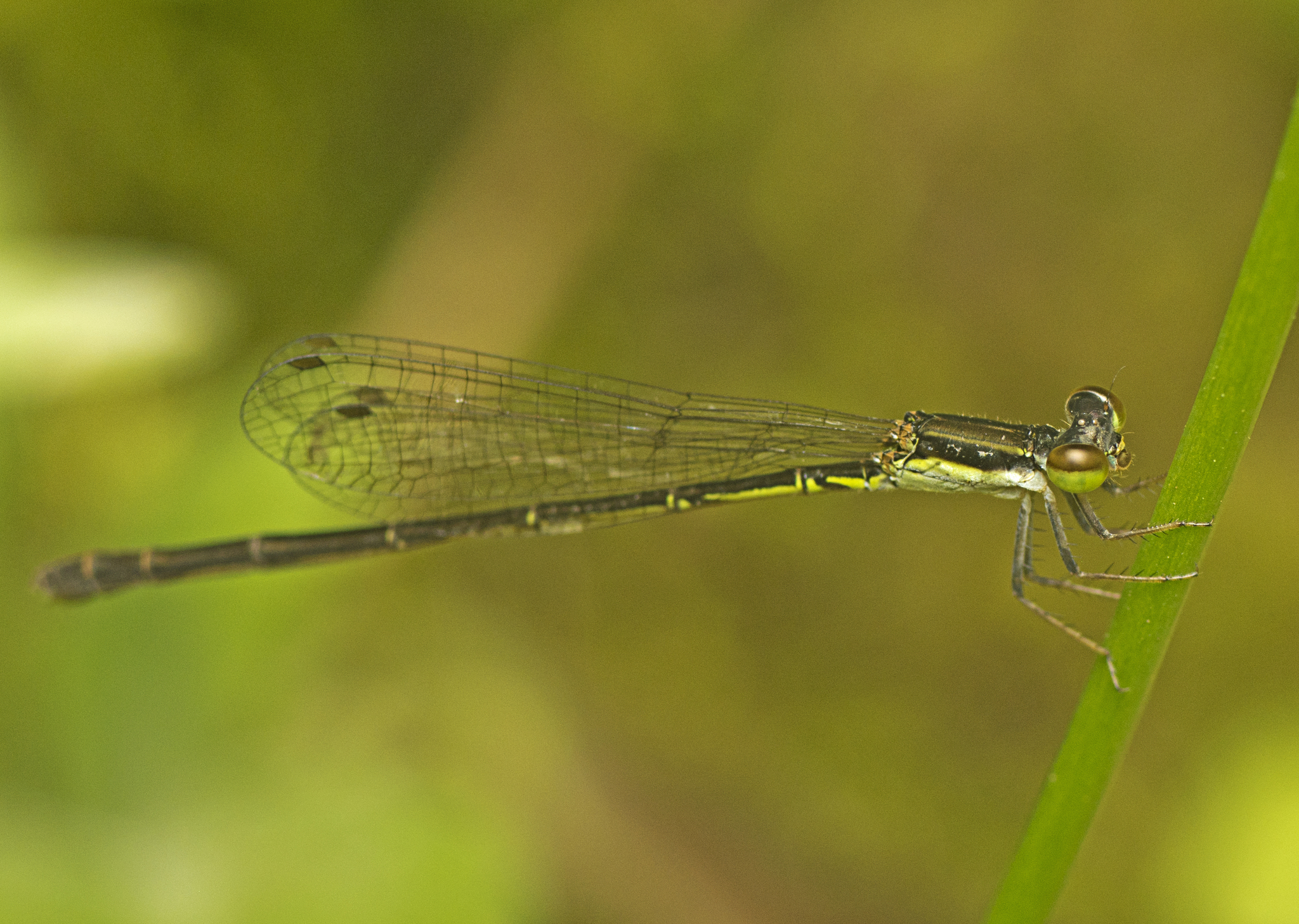
- Female

Conservation status
- Least Concern (IUCN 3.1)

Scientific classification
- Kingdom: Animalia
- Phylum: Arthropoda
- Clade: Pancrustacea
- Class: Insecta
- Order: Odonata
- Suborder: Zygoptera
- Family: Coenagrionidae
- Genus: Agriocnemis
- Species: A. rubricauda

Binomial name
- Agriocnemis rubricauda Tillyard, 1913

Synonyms
- Agriocnemis trilobatus Sjöstedt, 1917

= Agriocnemis rubricauda =

Red-rumped wisp

Species of damselfly

Agriocnemis rubricauda is a species of Australian damselfly in the family Coenagrionidae, commonly known as a red-rumped wisp. It is a small damselfly; the male has a red end to his tail. It has been recorded from northern Australia where it inhabits boggy seepages and swamps.

== Etymology ==
The genus name Agriocnemis is derived from two Greek words: agrion or ἄγριος, meaning wild, and cnemis or κνημίς, meaning legging. Agrion was the name given in 1775 by Johan Fabricius for all damselflies. cnemis is commonly used for many damselflies in the family Coenagrionidae.

The species name rubricauda is derived from two Latin words: ruber meaning red; and cauda meaning tail. In 1913, Robin Tillyard named this species after the brilliant red segments at the end of a male abdomen.

== Gallery ==
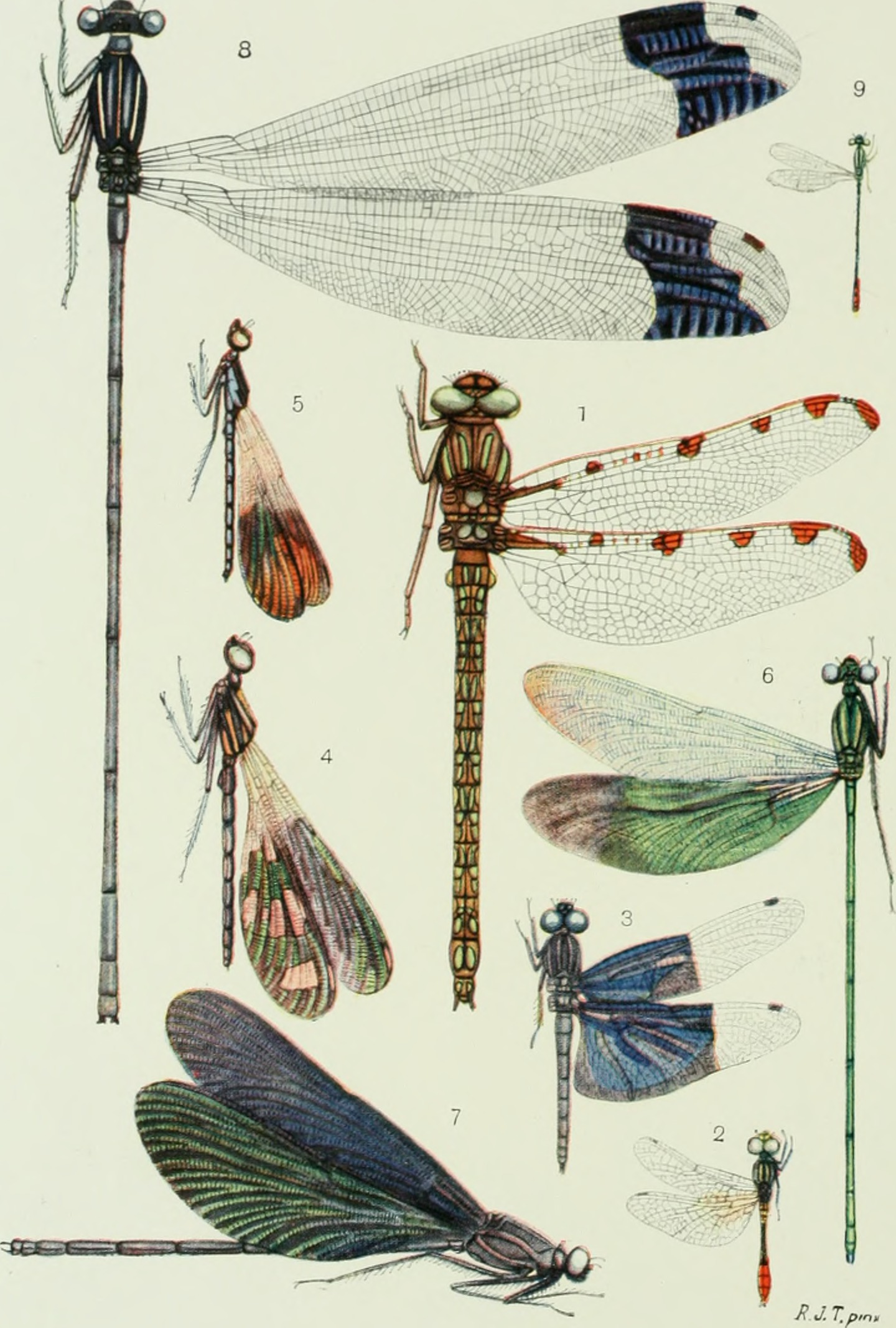
Figure 9. Male

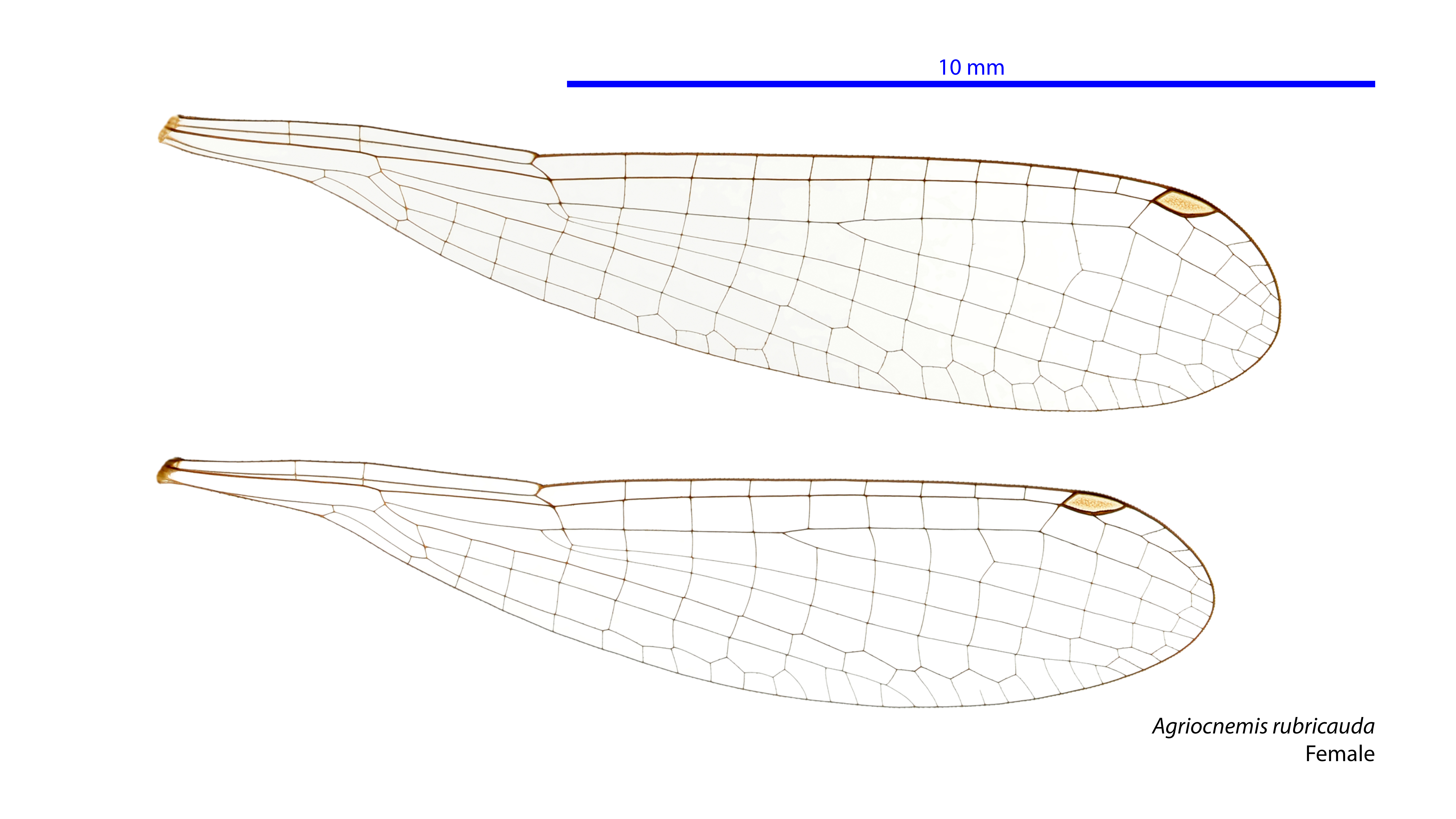
Female wings

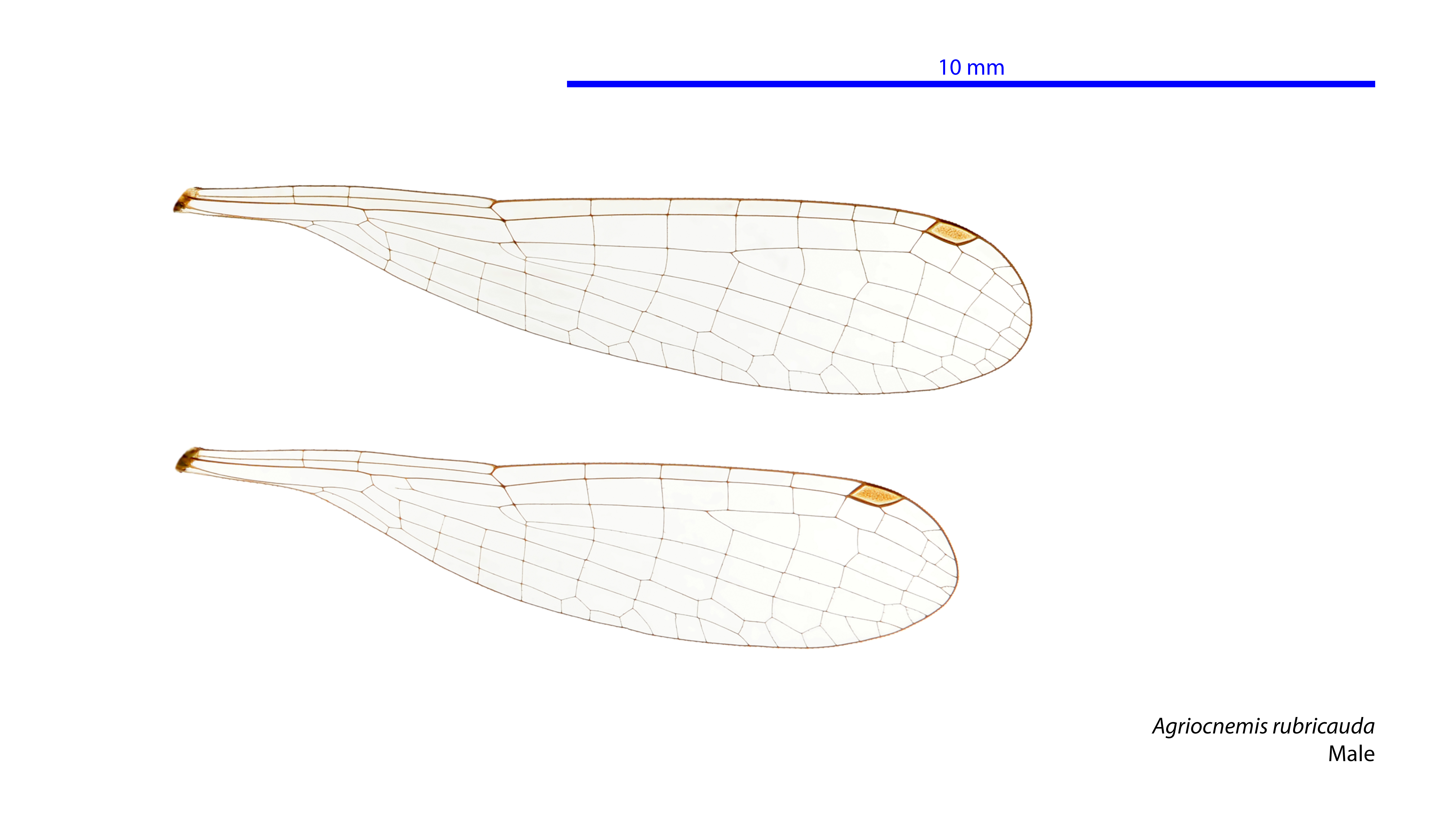
Male wings

== See also ==
- List of Odonata species of Australia
