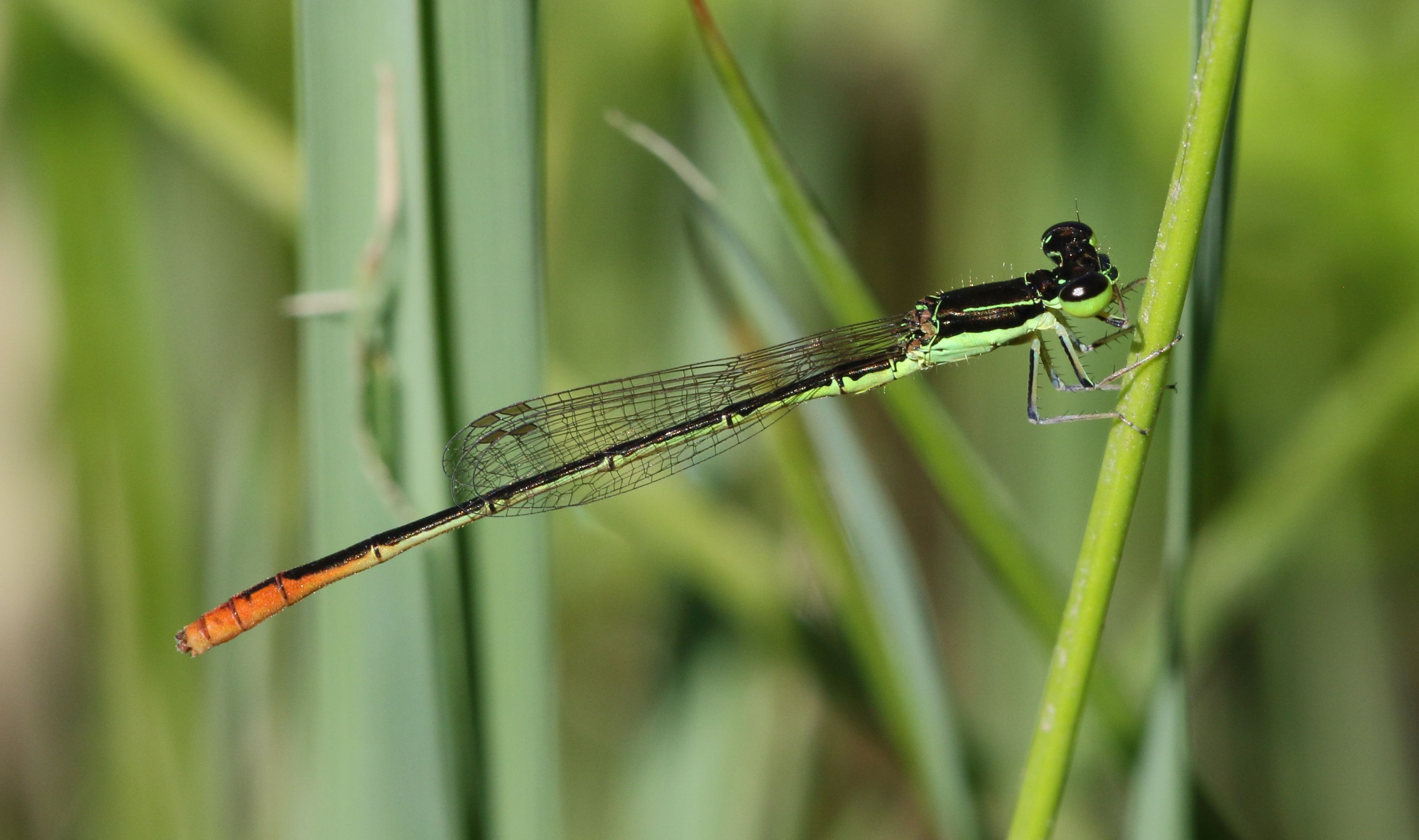
- Male

Conservation status
- Least Concern (IUCN 3.1)

Scientific classification
- Kingdom: Animalia
- Phylum: Arthropoda
- Class: Insecta
- Order: Odonata
- Suborder: Zygoptera
- Family: Coenagrionidae
- Genus: Agriocnemis
- Species: A. pinheyi

Binomial name
- Agriocnemis pinheyi Balinsky, 1963

= Agriocnemis pinheyi =

Species of damselfly

Agriocnemis pinheyi is a species of damselfly in the family Coenagrionidae. It is found in Mozambique, South Africa, Tanzania, Zambia, Zimbabwe, and possibly Malawi.

== Habitat ==
Its natural habitats include standing waters in open highlands (often grasslands), usually with emergent grasses; often boggy.

== Description and identification ==
The patterns of colour on the thorax and abdomen of the wisps are striking, but are seldom useful for identification as they are similar in many of the species and they vary considerably with age. The following can be useful:

- Postocular spots of A. pinheyi these are oval and intermediate in size between the smaller ones of A. exilis, and the larger ones of A. gratiosa; they are not elongated towards the centre of head (as in A. falcifera).
- The lower frons (antefrons) of A. pinheyi forms a light green moustache that runs from eye to eye; in A. gratiosa, this "moustache" is always broken by black in the centre of the face (and is usually broken in A. exilis). In South Africa, this moustache is pruinose only in mature males of A. falcifera.
- Labrum of A. pinheyi is glossy black with a pale (generally bright green) border, rather than all black with a purple sheen (A. falcifera).
- Hindlobe of prothorax: incised at two sides, separating fan-like middle section (A. pinheyi, A. falcifera, A. ruberrima); in A. exilis the hind margin of prothorax is a simple, entire curve - not incised.
- Green thoracic stripe of A. pinheyi is narrow (wider in A. gratiosa).
- Pterostigmata of A. pinheyi are similar in all wings, rather than being darker in the hindwing than in the forewing (A. falcifera).
- Apex of S10: This is only slightly raised in A. pinheyi; A. ruberrima has S10 apex distinctly raised.
- Cerci: Those of A. pinheyi and A. falcifera have a sharp triangular pointed end that is directed inwards towards S10; the tips of the cerci of A. gratiosa point outwards from S10.
- Paraprocts (lower appendages) of A. pinheyi and A. falcifera are almost as long as the cerci, tapering to a pointed apex in lateral view, but in caudal view (from below) ending broadly, so visible as black ridge that is wider than high; paraprocts of A. gratiosa are longer than the cerci.
- Length: A. pinheyi is smaller (20 mm long) than A. gratiosa (25 mm) and A. falcifera (24–25 mm) - similar in size to A. exilis (18–22 mm).
