= Agriocnemis palaeforma =

Conservation status
- Vulnerable (IUCN 3.1)

Scientific classification
- Kingdom: Animalia
- Phylum: Arthropoda
- Class: Insecta
- Order: Odonata
- Suborder: Zygoptera
- Family: Coenagrionidae
- Genus: Agriocnemis
- Species: A. palaeforma

Binomial name
- Agriocnemis palaeforma Pinhey, 1959

Species of damselfly

Agriocnemis palaeforma is a species of damselfly in the family Coenagrionidae. It is found in Uganda and possibly Cameroon. Its natural habitats are swamps, freshwater marshes, and intermittent freshwater marshes. It is threatened by habitat loss.
