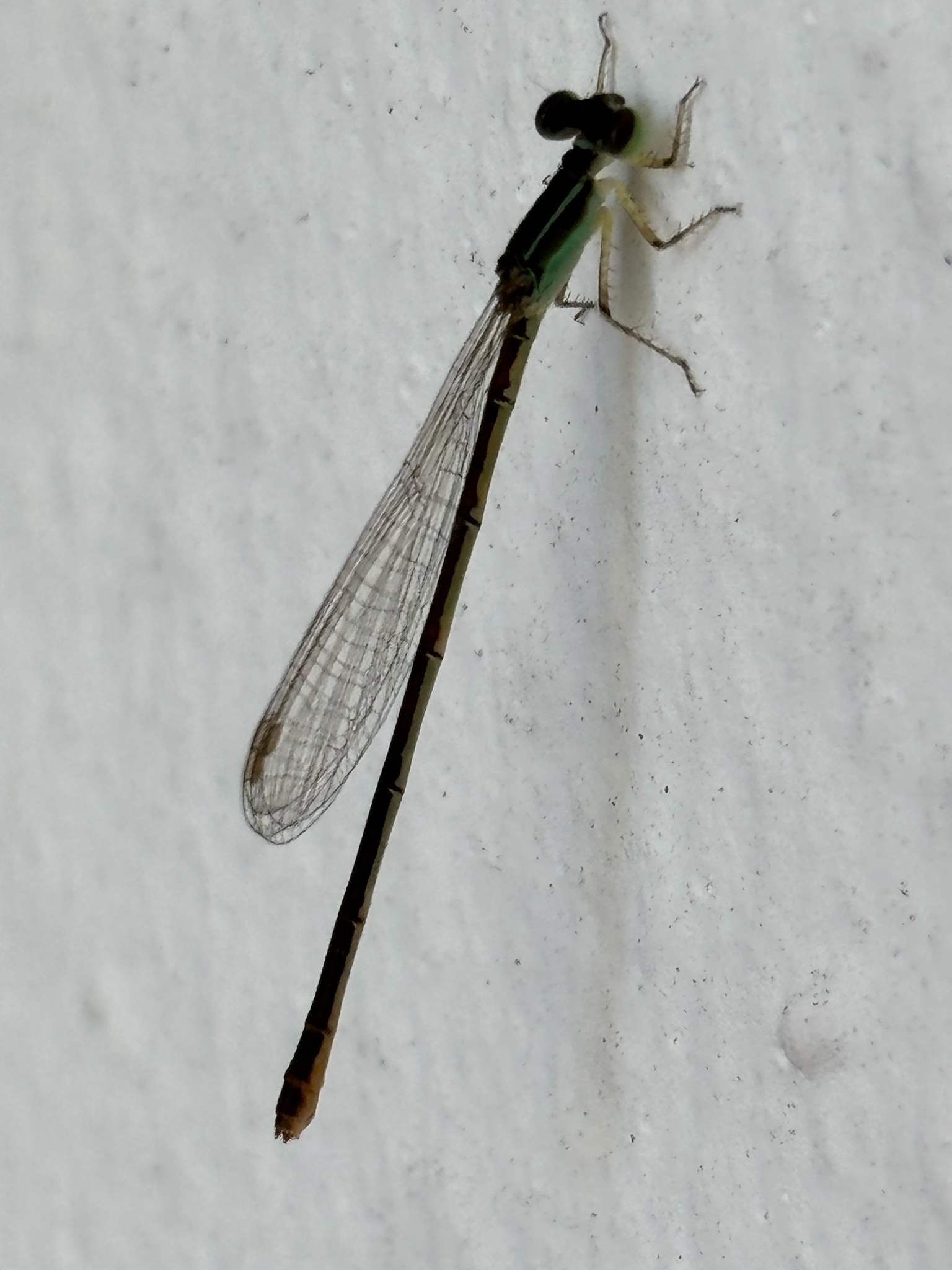

Conservation status
- Least Concern (IUCN 3.1)

Scientific classification
- Kingdom: Animalia
- Phylum: Arthropoda
- Clade: Pancrustacea
- Class: Insecta
- Order: Odonata
- Suborder: Zygoptera
- Family: Coenagrionidae
- Genus: Agriocnemis
- Species: A. exilis

Binomial name
- Agriocnemis exilis Selys, 1872

= Agriocnemis exilis =

Species of damselfly

Agriocnemis exilis is a species of damselfly in the family Coenagrionidae. It is found in Angola, Botswana, Burkina Faso, Cameroon, Central African Republic, Chad, Ivory Coast, Egypt, Ethiopia, Gambia, Ghana, Guinea, Kenya, Liberia, Madagascar, Malawi, Mauritius, Mozambique, Namibia, Nigeria, Réunion, Senegal, Sierra Leone, Somalia, South Africa, Tanzania, Togo, Uganda, Zambia, Zimbabwe, and possibly Burundi.
