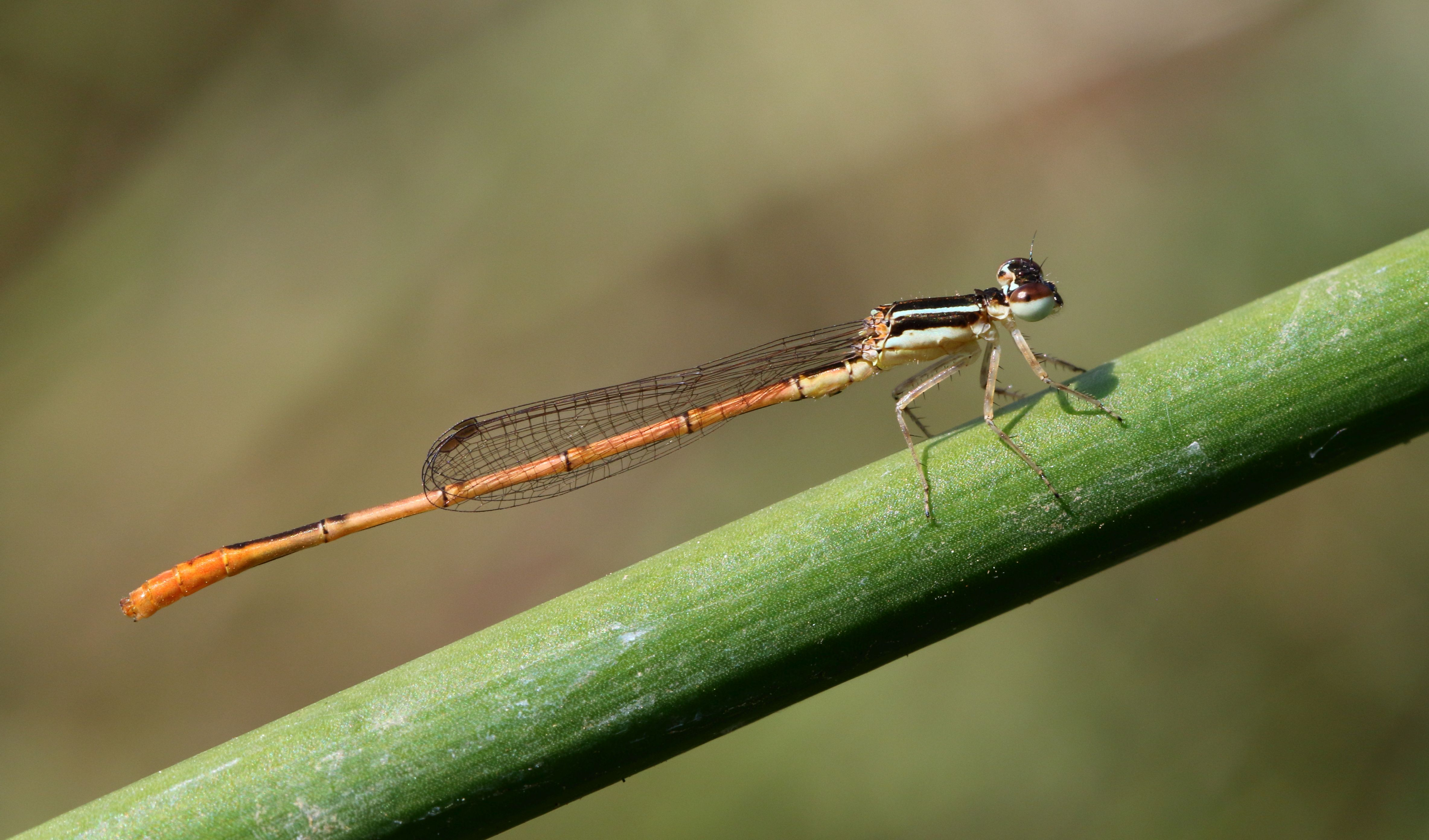
- Immature male; Cumberland Nature Reserve, KwaZulu-Natal

Conservation status
- Least Concern (IUCN 3.1)

Scientific classification
- Kingdom: Animalia
- Phylum: Arthropoda
- Class: Insecta
- Order: Odonata
- Suborder: Zygoptera
- Family: Coenagrionidae
- Genus: Agriocnemis
- Species: A. falcifera

Binomial name
- Agriocnemis falcifera Pinhey, 1959

= Agriocnemis falcifera =

Species of damselfly

Agriocnemis falcifera, the white-masked whisp, is a species of damselfly in the family Coenagrionidae. It is endemic to southern Africa. This tiny damselfly is found in grassy fringes of ponds and pools and is gregarious.

It is 23–27 mm long with a wingspan of 23–30 mm. Males and females are similar; when immature they are initially all orange-red, with later stages orange-red on the terminal segments of the abdomen only; when mature, only the anal appendages are orange-red. The forehead has a whitish band that runs from eye to eye, and the small green post-ocular spots are connected across the back of the head.
