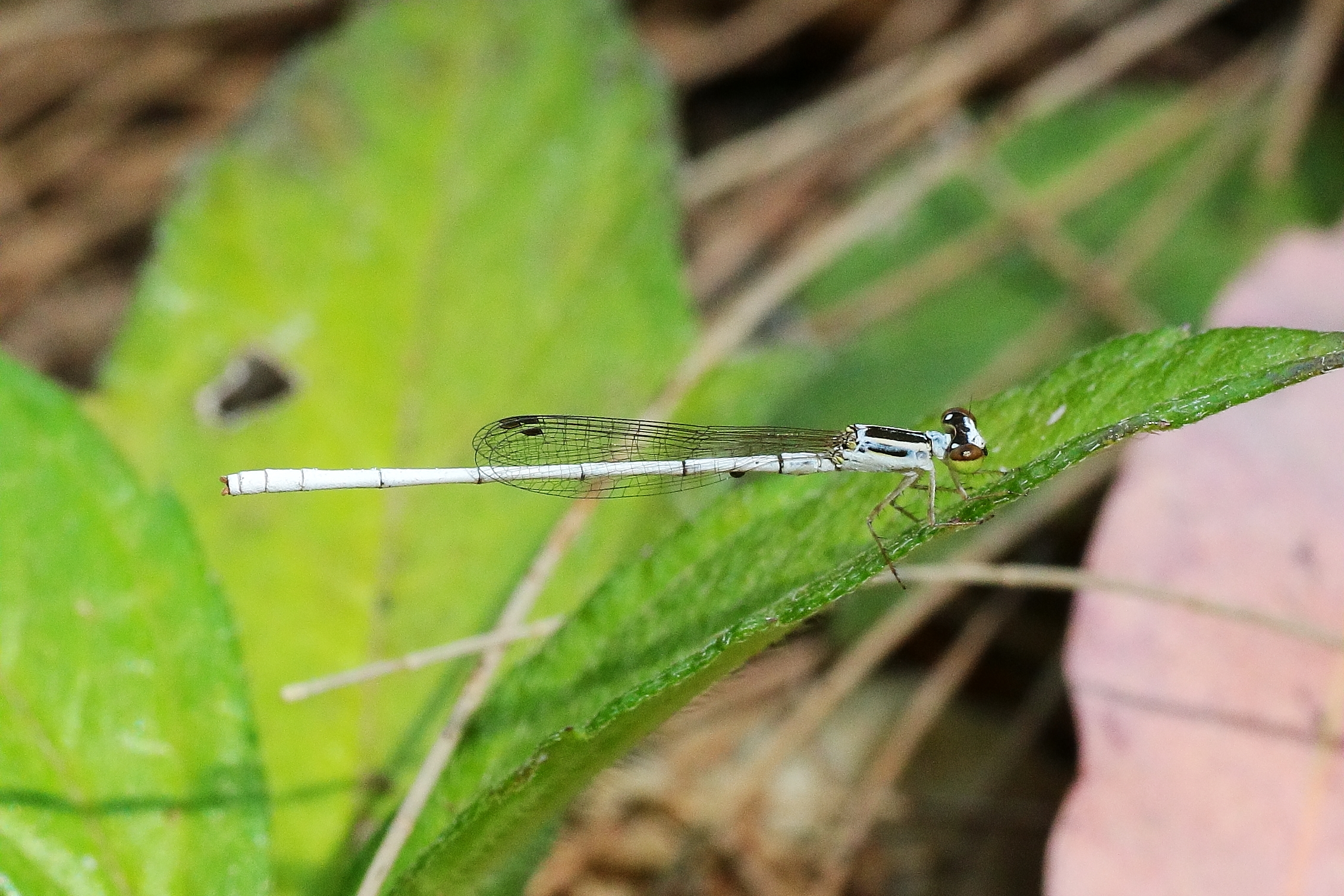
- Male, Queensland

Conservation status
- Least Concern (IUCN 3.1)

Scientific classification
- Kingdom: Animalia
- Phylum: Arthropoda
- Clade: Pancrustacea
- Class: Insecta
- Order: Odonata
- Suborder: Zygoptera
- Family: Coenagrionidae
- Genus: Agriocnemis
- Species: A. argentea

Binomial name
- Agriocnemis argentea Tillyard, 1906

= Agriocnemis argentea =

Silver wisp

Species of damselfly

Agriocnemis argentea is a species of damselfly in the family Coenagrionidae, commonly known as a silver wisp. It is a small damselfly; the male, when mature, is covered in a white pruinescence. It is endemic to northern Australia where it inhabits both still and flowing waters.

== Etymology ==
The genus name Agriocnemis is derived from two Greek words: agrion or ἄγριος, meaning wild, and cnemis or κνημίς, meaning legging. Agrion was the name given in 1775 by Johan Fabricius for all damselflies. cnemis is commonly used for many damselflies in the family Coenagrionidae.

The species name argentea is a Latin word meaning the colour of silver. In 1906 Robin Tillyard named this species of damselfly after the beautiful silvery white bloom covering of mature adults, which when flying ... appears as a bright silver streak, darting in and out of the grass.

== Gallery ==
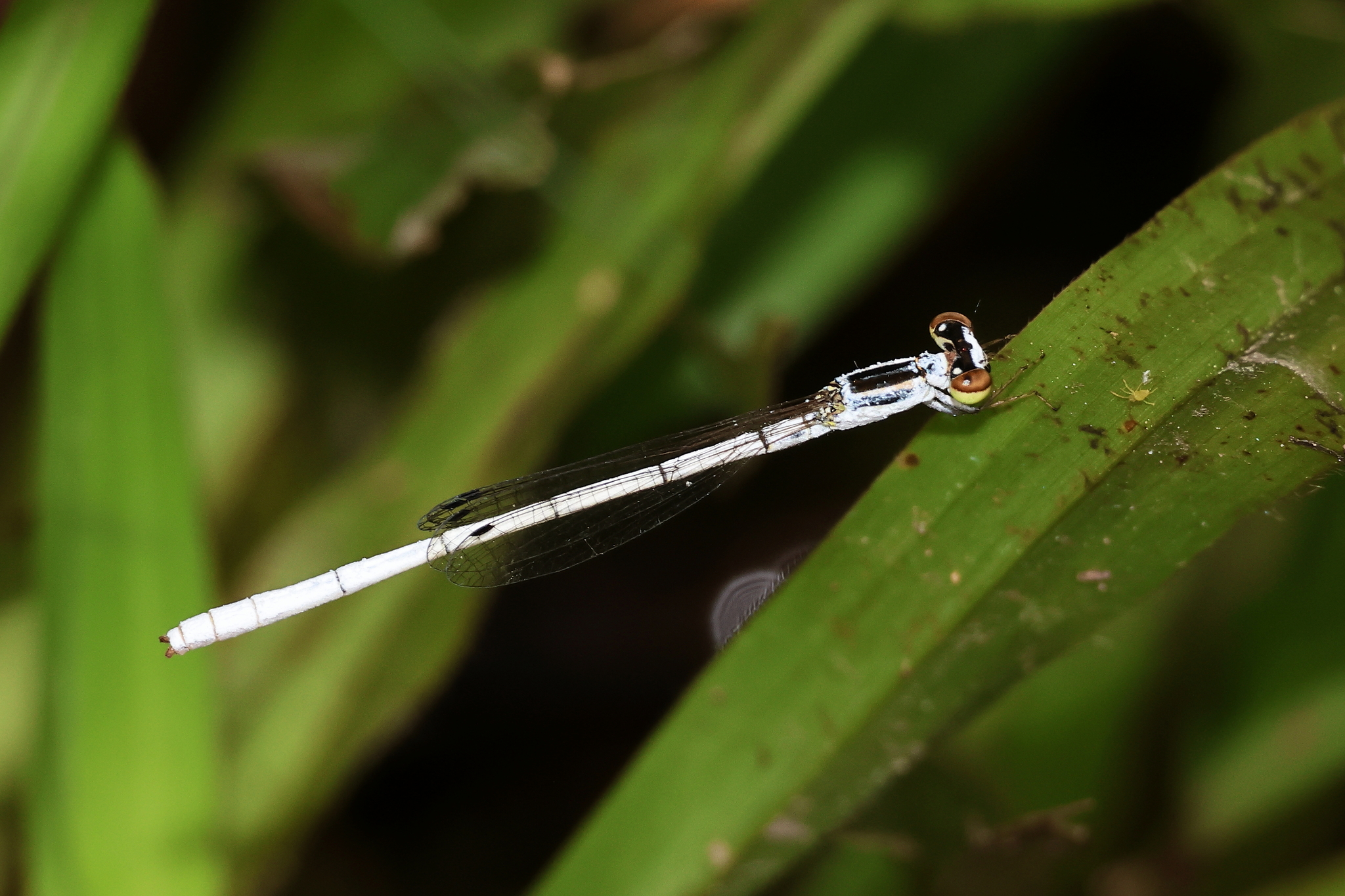
Male Silver Wisp

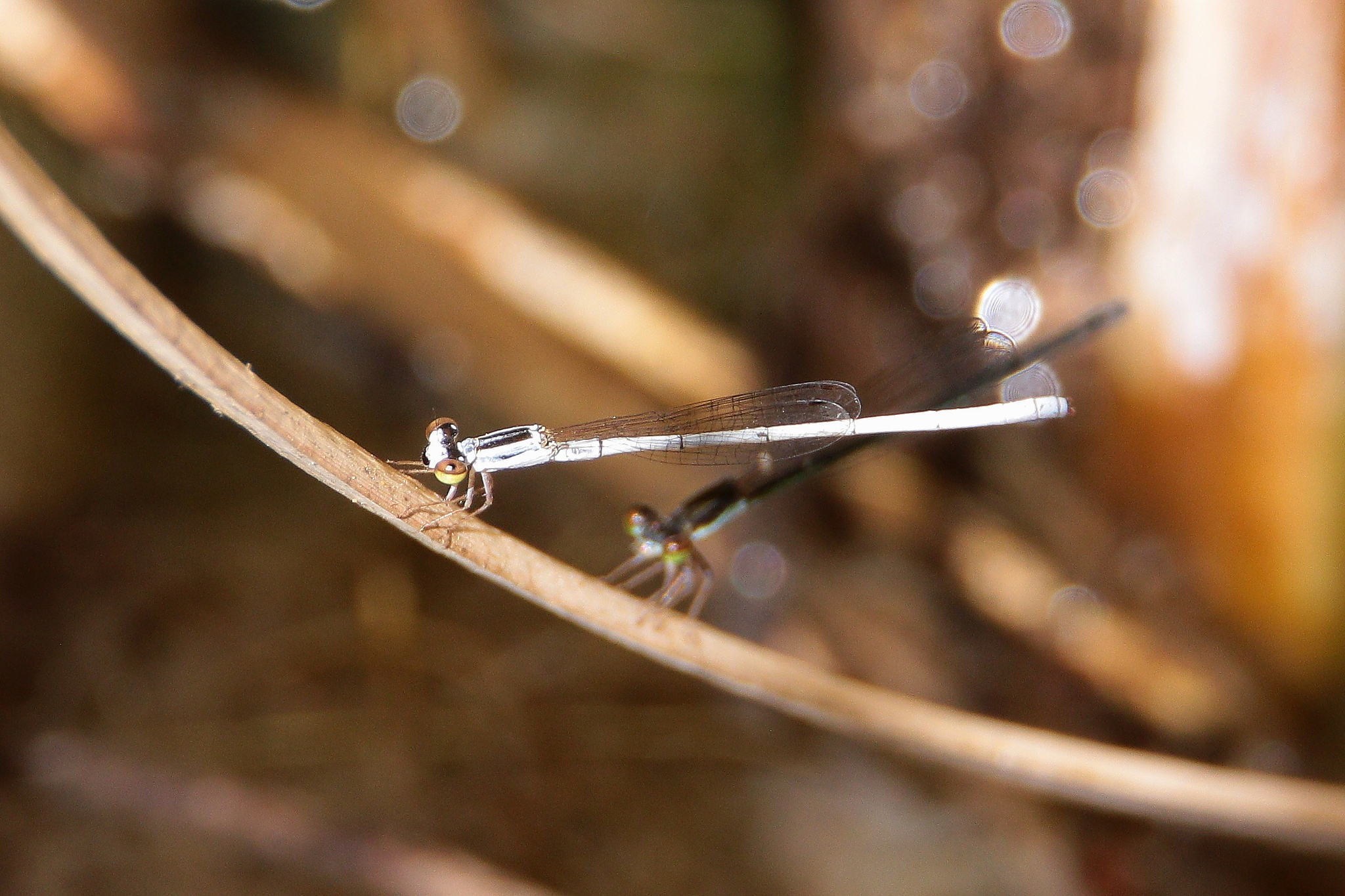
Male in foreground

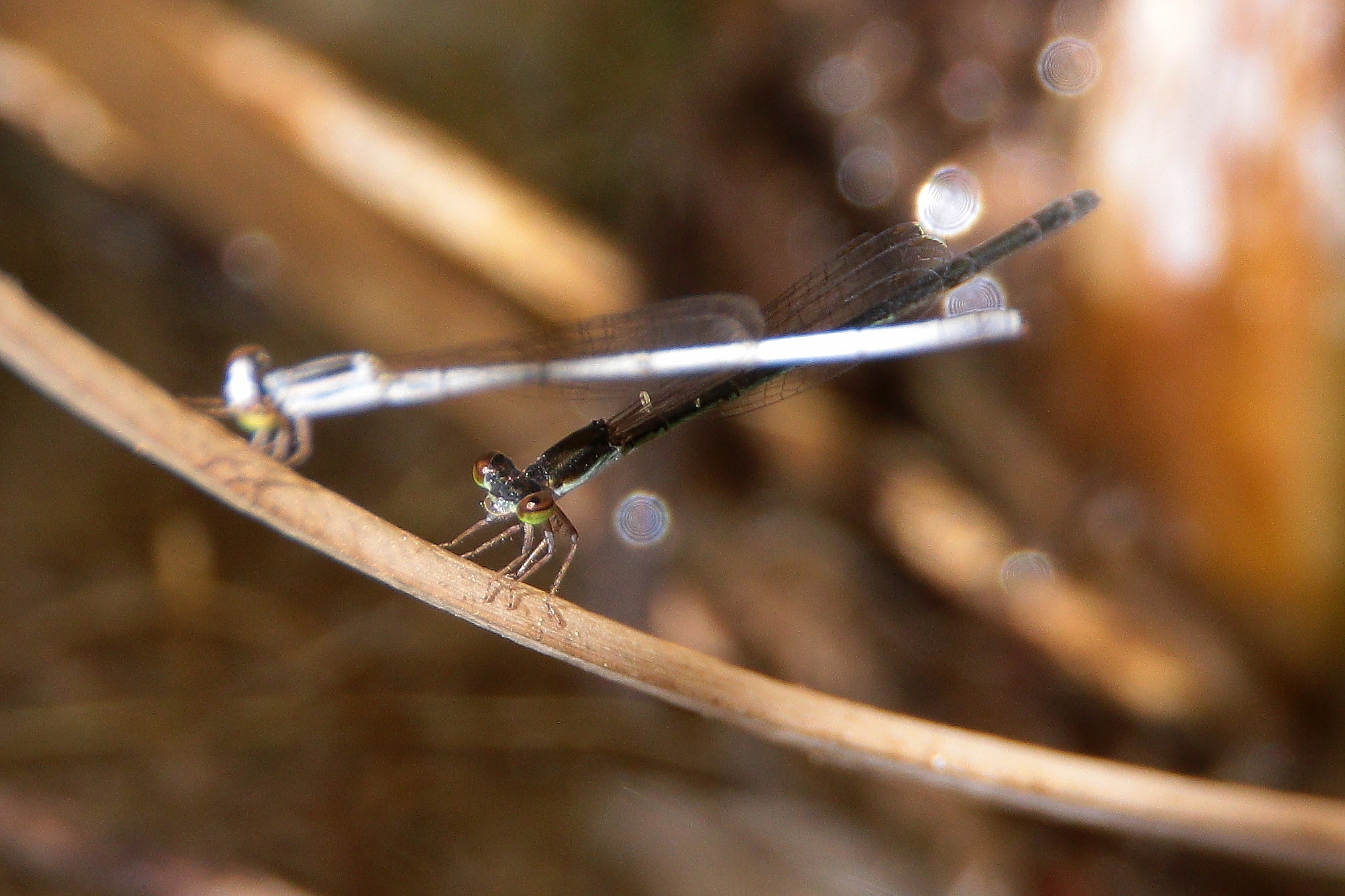
Female in background

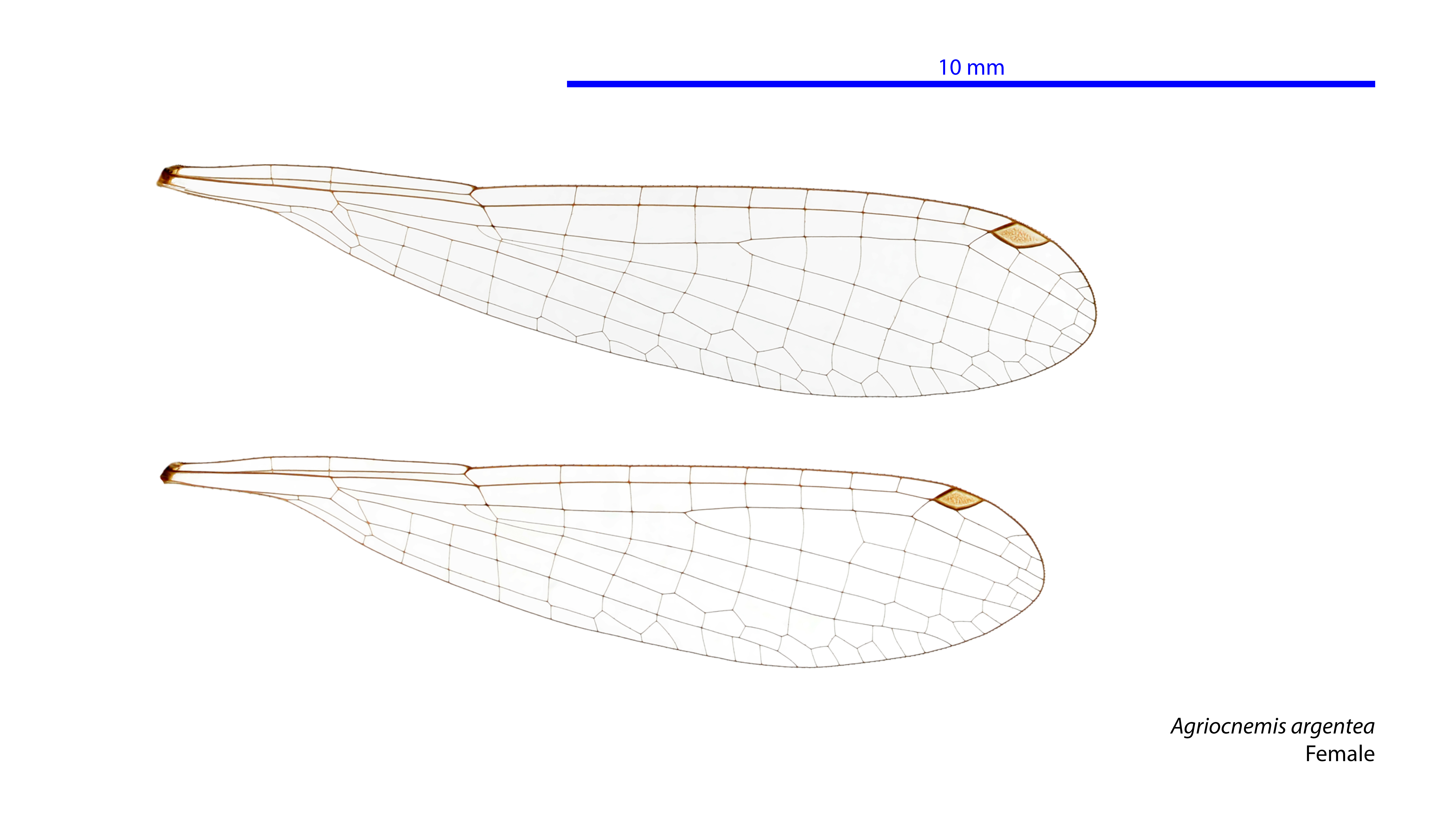
Female wings

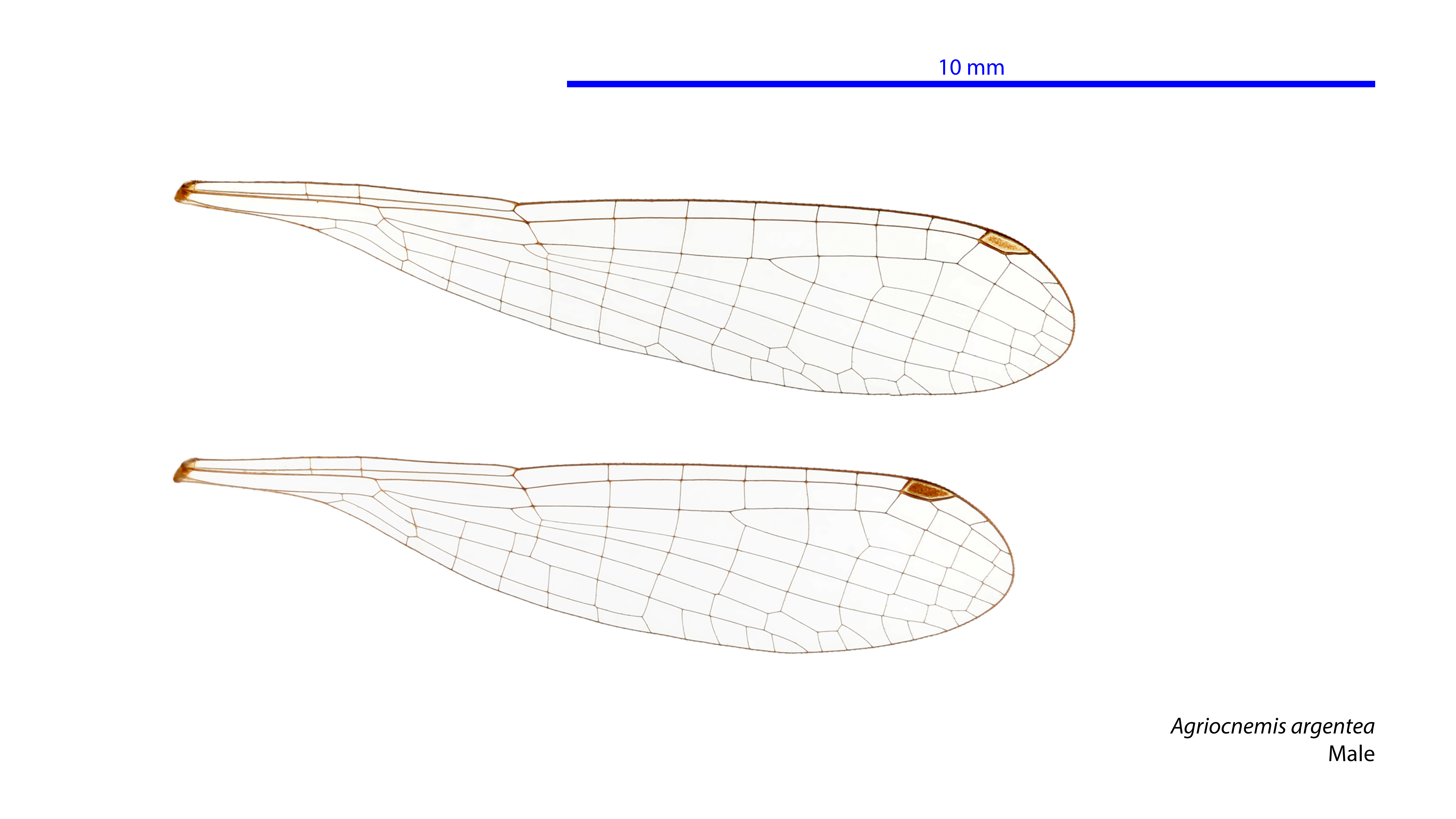
Male wings

== See also ==
- List of Odonata species of Australia
