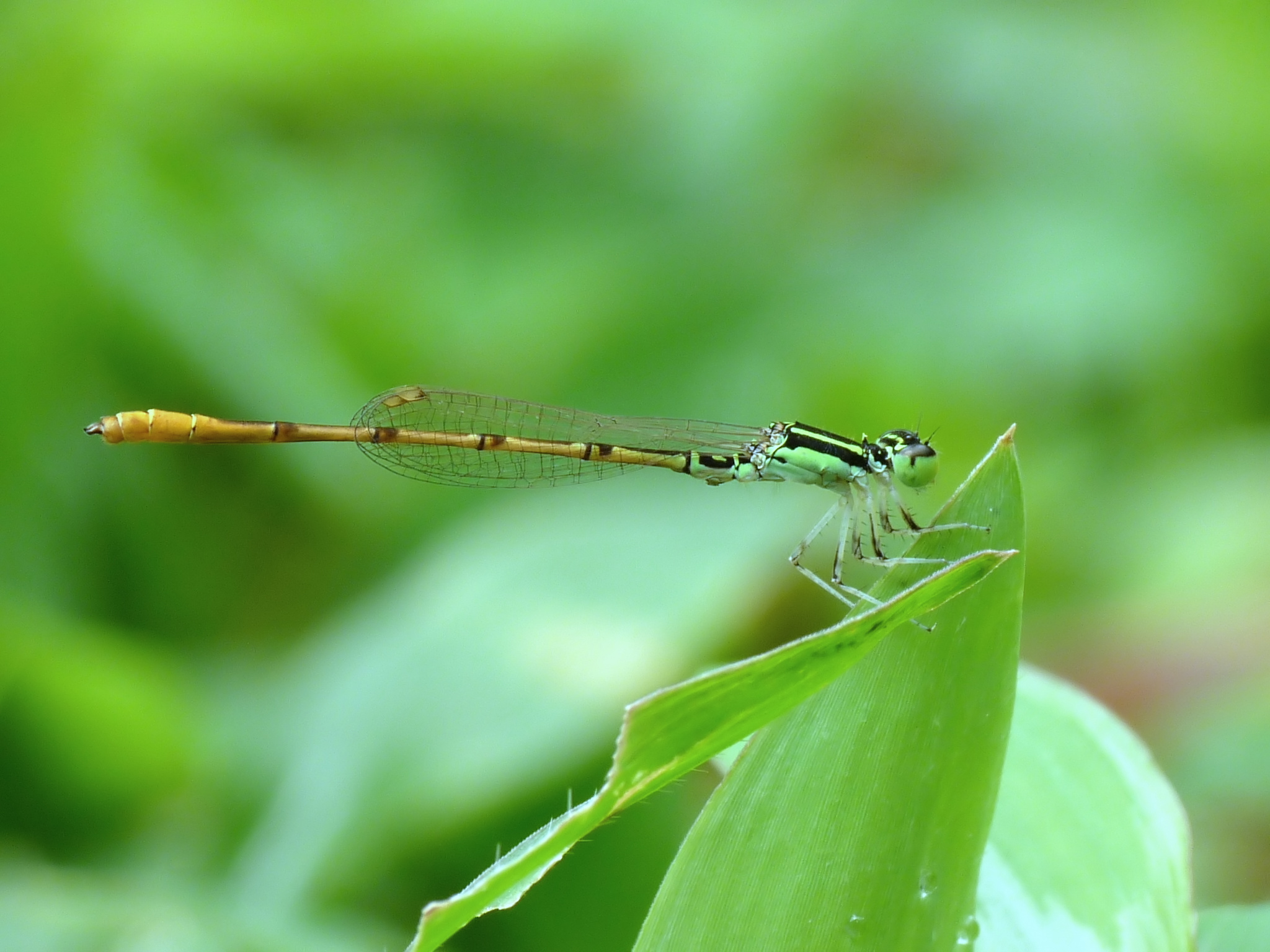
- male
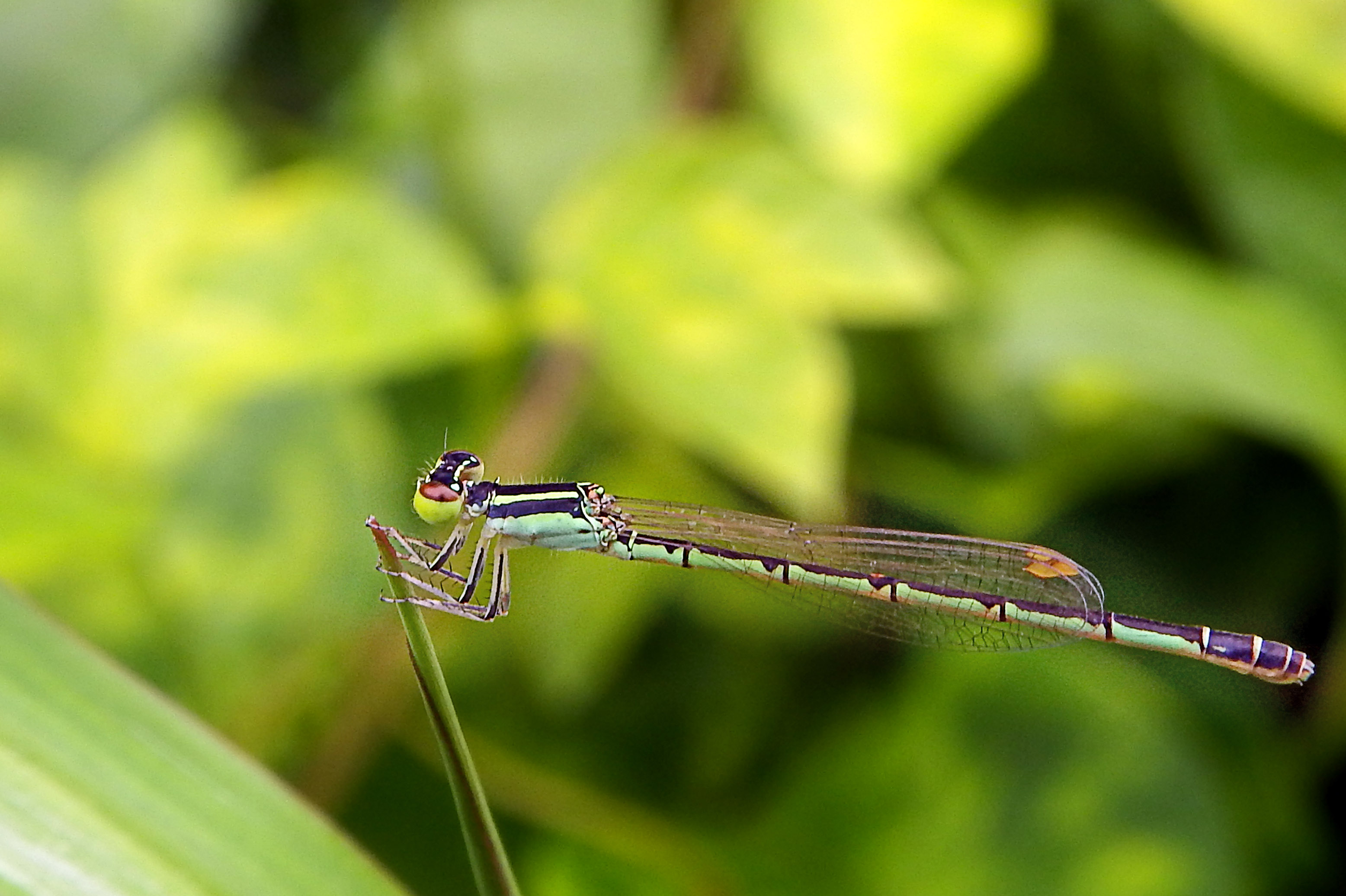
- female

Conservation status
- Least Concern (IUCN 3.1)

Scientific classification
- Kingdom: Animalia
- Phylum: Arthropoda
- Clade: Pancrustacea
- Class: Insecta
- Order: Odonata
- Suborder: Zygoptera
- Family: Coenagrionidae
- Genus: Agriocnemis
- Species: A. keralensis

Binomial name
- Agriocnemis keralensis Peters, 1981

= Agriocnemis keralensis =

Species of damselfly

Agriocnemis keralensis, Kerala dartlet, is a species of damselfly in the family Coenagrionidae. It is endemic to Western Ghats in India.

== Description and habitat ==
It is a small damselfly, known to occur only in Kerala and Goa. Due to the small size of this species and its close morphological similarities with Agriocnemis pygmaea, it can be easily overlooked in the field. It is a small damselfly with brown capped green eyes, black thorax with apple green stripes on lateral sides and reddish abdomen with black marks. The segment 2 of the abdomen has a distinct "cobra's hood" mark on dorsum. The abdomen of the female is apple green with black marks. Commonly found on the grass on the bank of weedy ponds close to paddy fields, lakes and small streams.

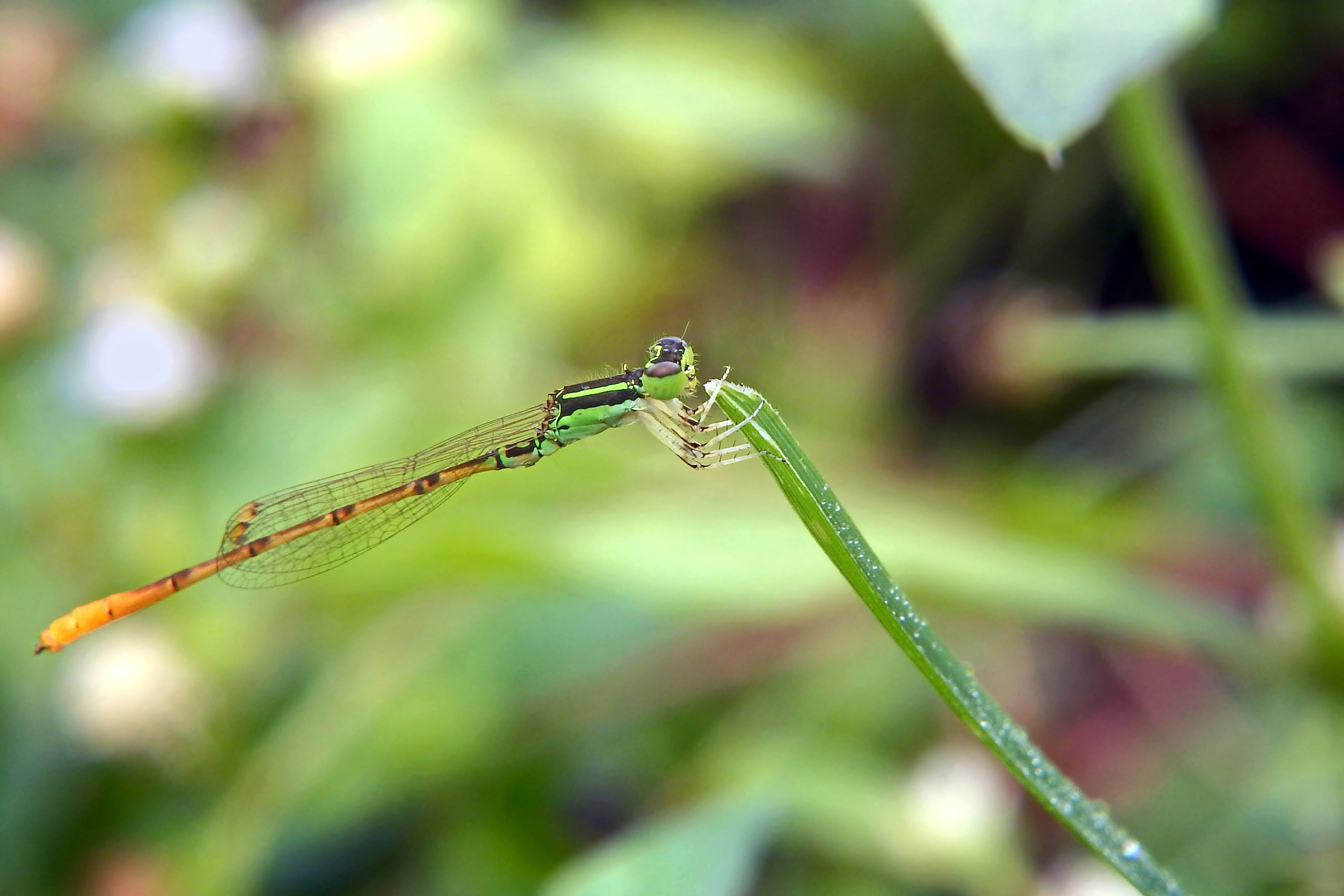
male

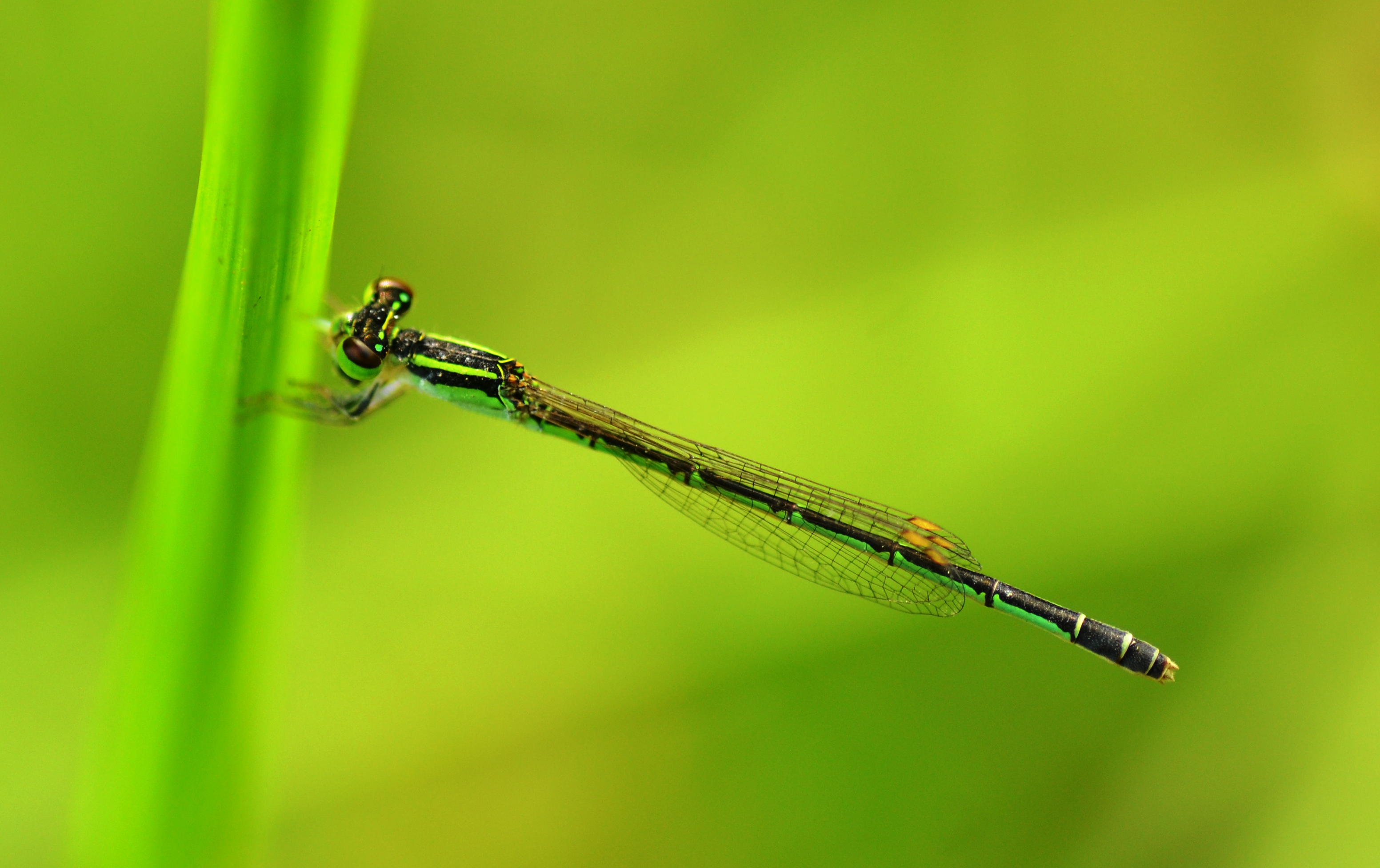
female

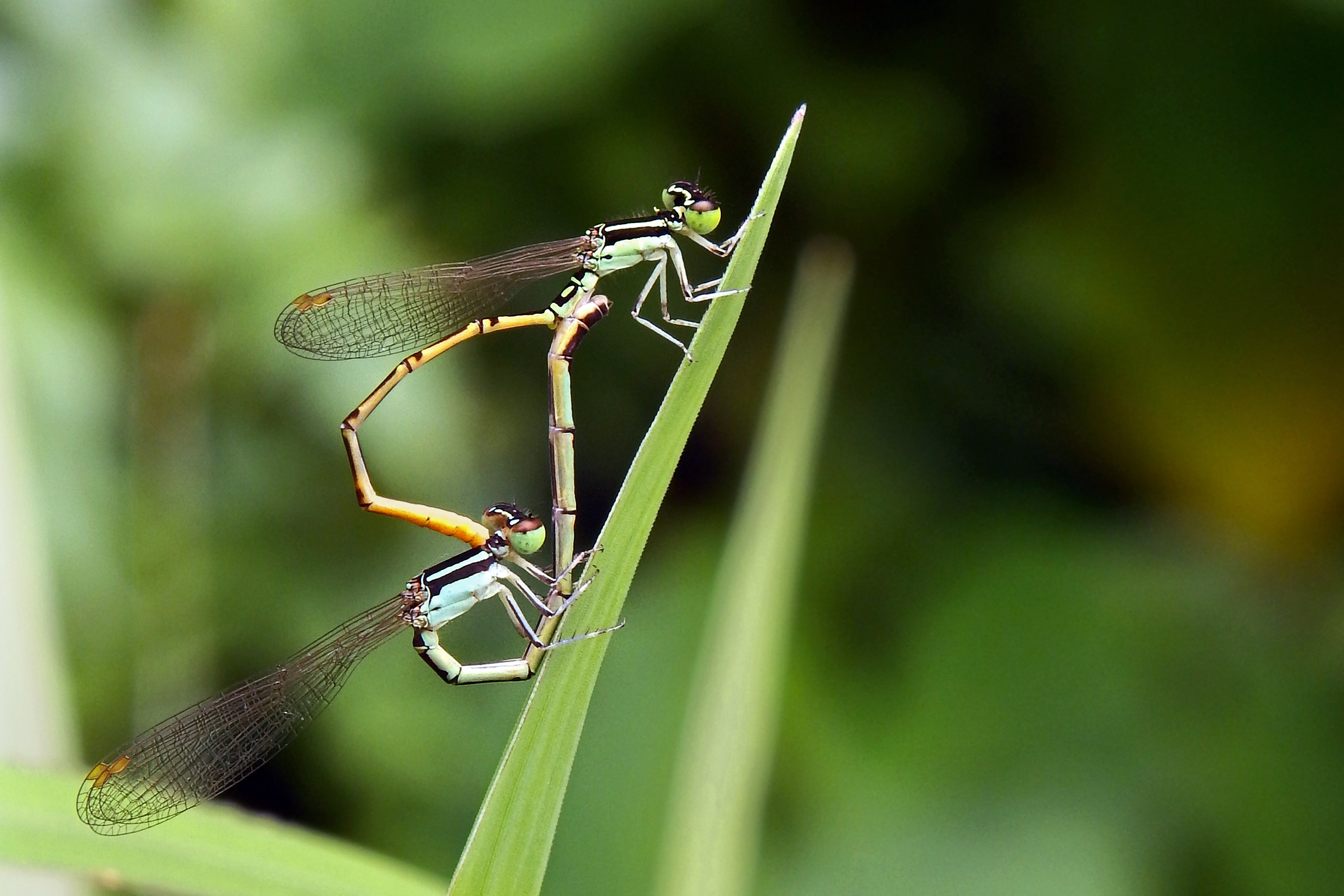
mating pair

== See also ==
- List of odonates of India
- List of odonata of Kerala
