= Agriocnemis inversa =

Conservation status
- Least Concern (IUCN 3.1)

Scientific classification
- Kingdom: Animalia
- Phylum: Arthropoda
- Class: Insecta
- Order: Odonata
- Suborder: Zygoptera
- Family: Coenagrionidae
- Genus: Agriocnemis
- Species: A. inversa

Binomial name
- Agriocnemis inversa Karsch, 1899

Species of damselfly

Agriocnemis inversa is a species of damselfly in the family Coenagrionidae. It is found in the Democratic Republic of the Congo, Djibouti, Ethiopia, Kenya, Sudan, and Uganda.
