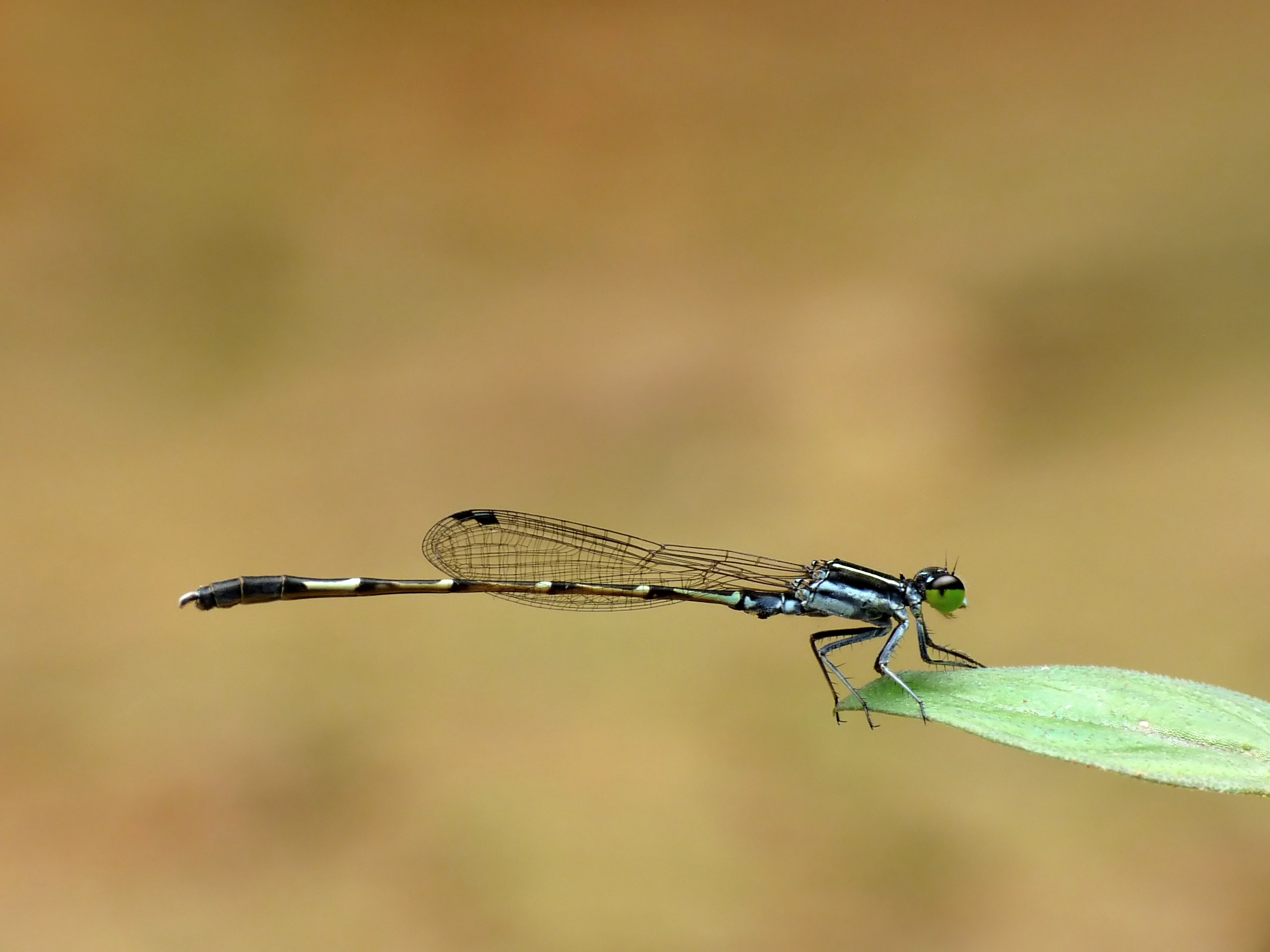
- Male
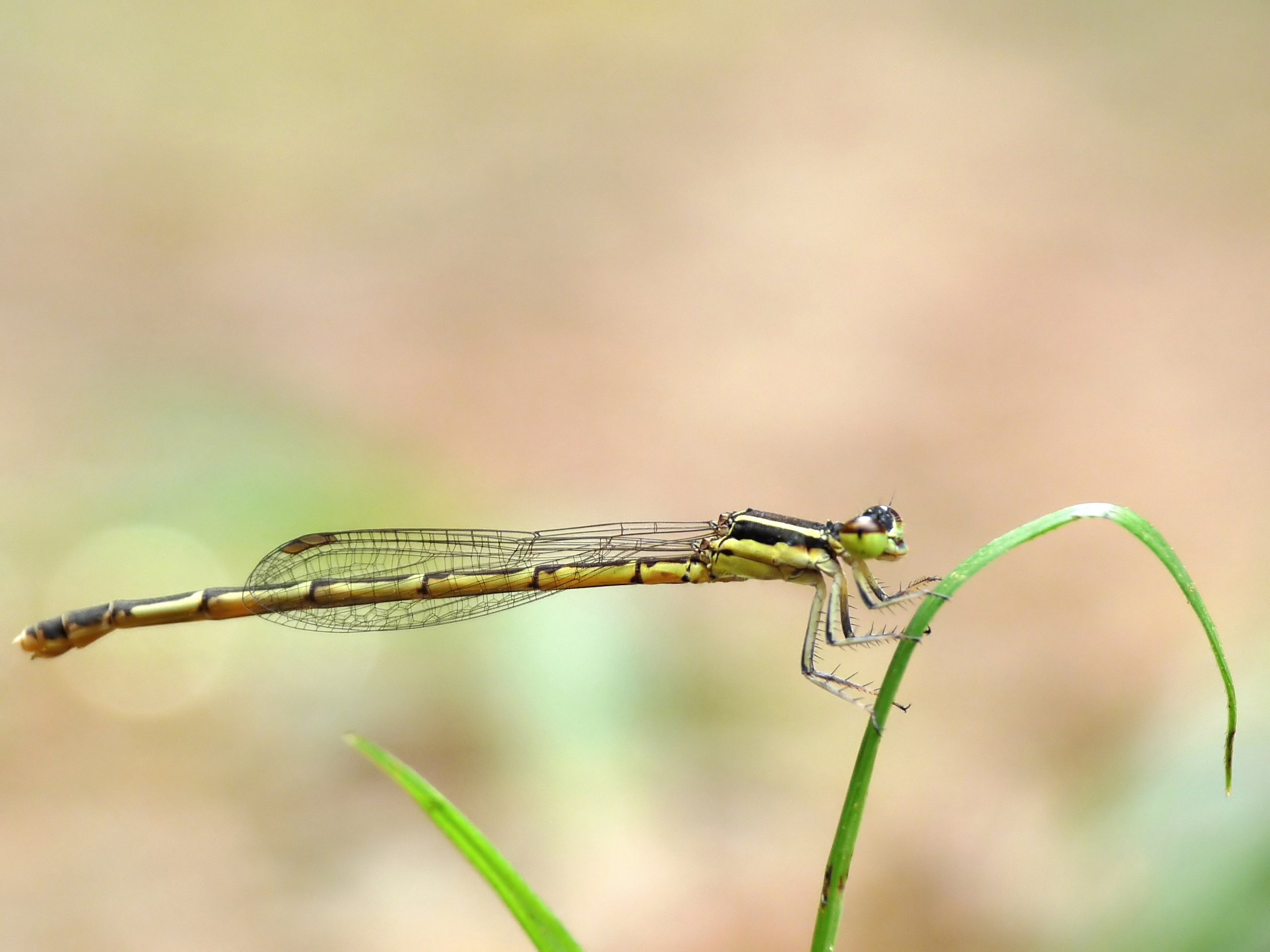
- Female

Conservation status
- Least Concern (IUCN 3.1)

Scientific classification
- Kingdom: Animalia
- Phylum: Arthropoda
- Clade: Pancrustacea
- Class: Insecta
- Order: Odonata
- Suborder: Zygoptera
- Family: Coenagrionidae
- Genus: Agriocnemis
- Species: A. splendidissima

Binomial name
- Agriocnemis splendidissima Laidlaw, 1919

= Agriocnemis splendidissima =

Species of damselfly

Agriocnemis splendidissima, the splendid dartlet, is a species of damselfly in the family Coenagrionidae. It is distributed throughout India and Pakistan and may be present in Bangladesh as well.

== Description and habitat ==
It is a small damselfly with black capped greenish eyes. Its thorax is black on dorsum and blue on lateral sides, turns into pruinose white in adults. Its abdomen is very slender and marked with black and pruinose blue. In sub-adults and juvenile males, these blue parts are in ground-red colors. Its anal appendages are long, narrow, and curved downward when seen from the sides. They are in ground color in young, and turn into blue when gets age. Female is similar in markings; but more robust and greenish yellow or reddish as in young males.

The species breeds in marshes and ponds, and is usually found in riparian zones of streams and among emergent vegetation in shallow streams.

== See also ==
- List of odonates of India
- List of odonata of Kerala
