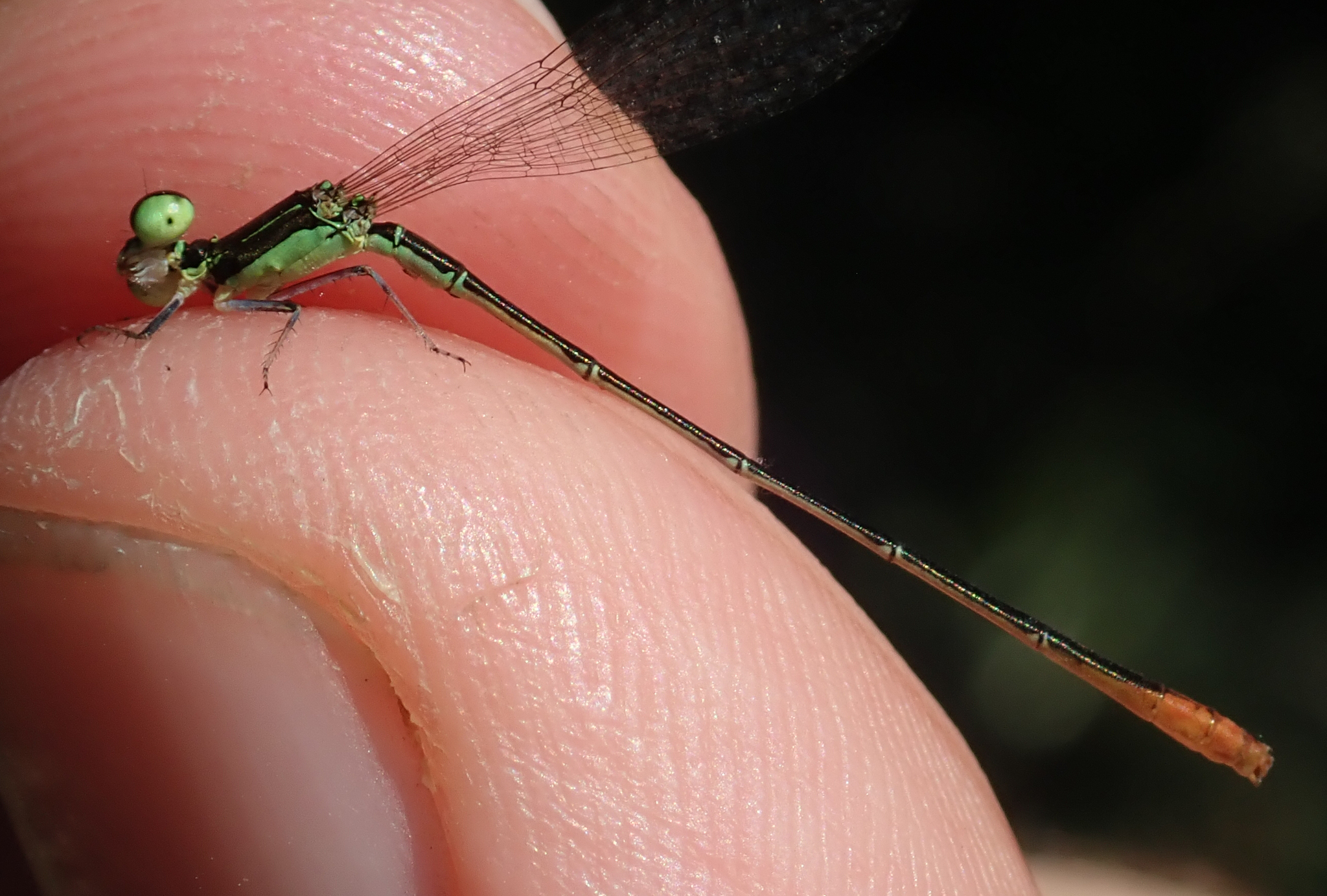

Conservation status
- Least Concern (IUCN 3.1)

Scientific classification
- Kingdom: Animalia
- Phylum: Arthropoda
- Class: Insecta
- Order: Odonata
- Suborder: Zygoptera
- Family: Coenagrionidae
- Genus: Agriocnemis
- Species: A. gratiosa

Binomial name
- Agriocnemis gratiosa Gerstäcker, 1891

= Agriocnemis gratiosa =

Species of damselfly

Agriocnemis gratiosa is a species of damselfly in the family Coenagrionidae. It is found in Botswana, the Democratic Republic of the Congo, Kenya, Madagascar, Malawi, Mozambique, Namibia, South Africa, Sudan, Tanzania, Uganda, Zambia, and possibly Burundi.
