= Agriocnemis victoria =

Conservation status
- Least Concern (IUCN 3.1)

Scientific classification
- Kingdom: Animalia
- Phylum: Arthropoda
- Clade: Pancrustacea
- Class: Insecta
- Order: Odonata
- Suborder: Zygoptera
- Family: Coenagrionidae
- Genus: Agriocnemis
- Species: A. victoria

Binomial name
- Agriocnemis victoria Fraser, 1928

Species of damselfly

Agriocnemis victoria, also commonly known as the Victoria wisp or the small pincer-tailed wisp, is a species of damselfly that belongs to the family Coenagrionidae (pond damselflies). This species is native to Africa where it is widespread throughout the western and central nations of the continent. This species is found in swamps.

There are no major threats to this species and is currently classified as Least Concerned species. However, it may be affected by water pollution and habitat loss from swamp drainage for agriculture and development.
