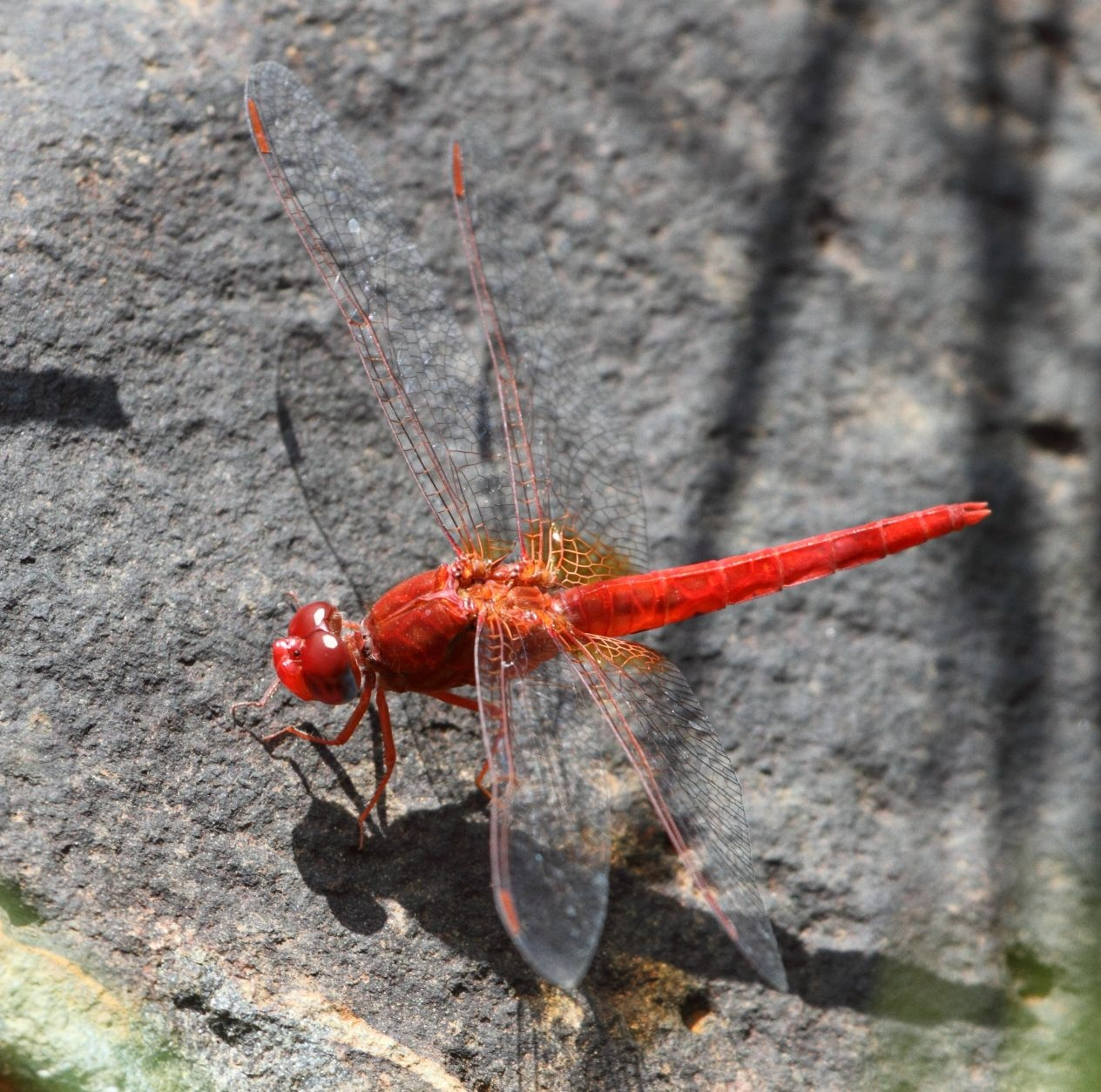
- Male

Conservation status
- Least Concern (IUCN 3.1)

Scientific classification
- Kingdom: Animalia
- Phylum: Arthropoda
- Class: Insecta
- Order: Odonata
- Infraorder: Anisoptera
- Family: Libellulidae
- Genus: Crocothemis
- Species: C. sanguinolenta

Binomial name
- Crocothemis sanguinolenta (Burmeister, 1839)

= Crocothemis sanguinolenta =

Species of dragonfly

Crocothemis sanguinolenta is a species of dragonfly in the family Libellulidae. It is found in Africa south of the Sahara (including Madagascar), in the Levant, and in the south of the Arabian Peninsula.

It is found in or near fresh water in a wide variety of habitats, from semi-arid bush to tropical forest.

Common names for this species include little scarlet, slim scarlet-darter and small scarlet.

== Similar species ==
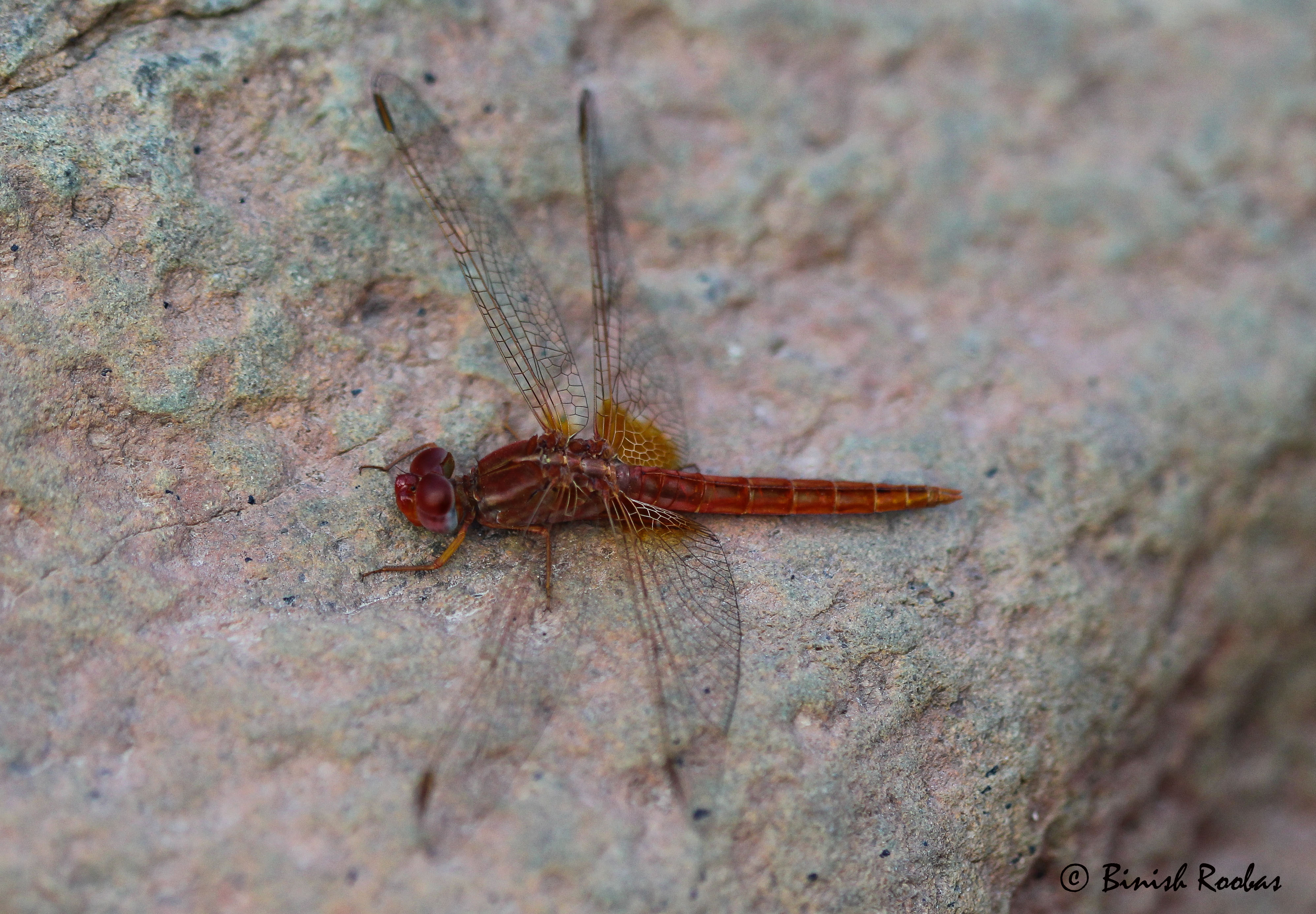
Crocothemis sanguinolenta from Wadi Wurrayah, United Arab Emirates

Over most of its range, Crocothemis sanguinolenta is easily confused with Crocothemis erythraea, but C. sanguinolenta has a narrower abdomen (3 mm or less wide), the lateral carinae of S3 to S7 are usually marked with black dashes, and the pterostigmata are short and usually the same colour as the abdomen (red in mature males). The abdomen of Crocothemis erythraea is 3.5 mm or more wide, the lateral carinae of S3 to S7 are generally unmarked, and the pterostigmata are longer and less brightly coloured than the abdomen.
