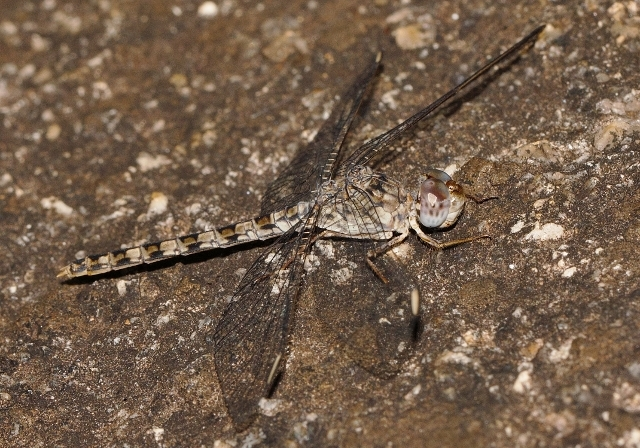
- (from iNaturalist)

Conservation status
- Least Concern (IUCN 3.1)

Scientific classification
- Kingdom: Animalia
- Phylum: Arthropoda
- Class: Insecta
- Order: Odonata
- Infraorder: Anisoptera
- Family: Libellulidae
- Genus: Crocothemis
- Species: C. saxicolor

Binomial name
- Crocothemis saxicolor Ris, 1919

= Crocothemis saxicolor =

Species of dragonfly

Crocothemis saxicolor is a species of dragonfly in the family Libellulidae. It is found in Malawi, Mozambique, Zambia, Zimbabwe, possibly Liberia, and possibly Sierra Leone. Its natural habitats are subtropical or tropical moist lowland forests, subtropical or tropical dry shrubland, subtropical or tropical moist shrubland, and rivers. It is threatened by habitat loss.
