= Hayle Kimbro Pool =

Wetland on The Lizard, Cornwall, England

Coordinates: 50.00758°N 5.21831°W

Hayle Kimbro Pool (Cornish: Hal Kembro, meaning "Welshman's marsh") is a wetland on The Lizard, Cornwall. It is situated two miles (3 km) southeast of Mullion immediately northeast of Predannack airfield at grid reference SW 695 169.

The wetland site consists of three shallow ponds with a combined winter surface area of 23,000 square metres. It forms part of the West Lizard Site of Special Scientific Interest.

The aquatic plant communities at the site are typified by Common Spike-rush, Common Cottongrass, Water Mint and Marsh Pennywort.

Hayle Kimbro Pool hosted Britain's first Scarlet Dragonfly in 1995 and was also the first site at which breeding evidence for the Lesser Emperor was detected, in 1999
