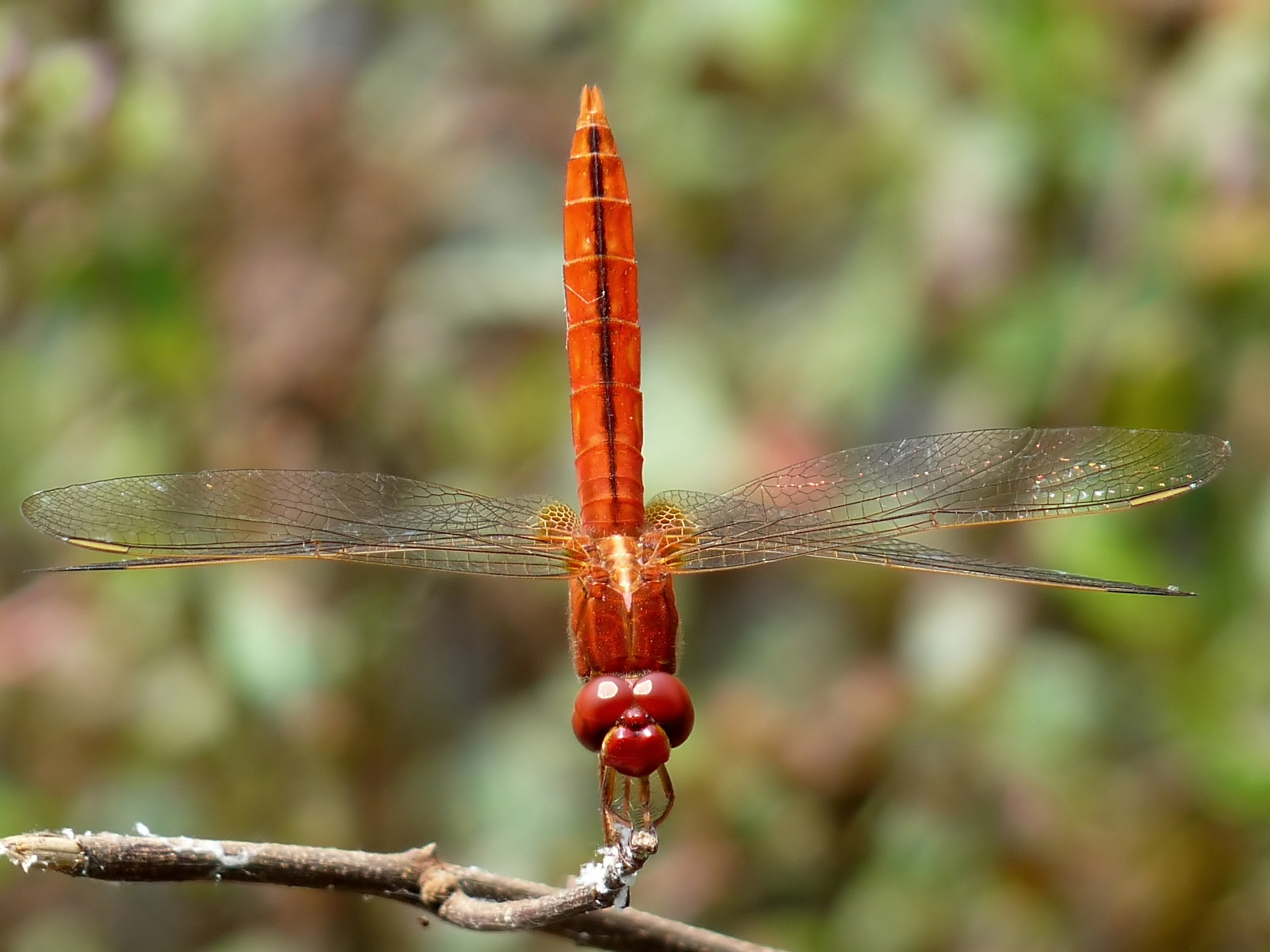
- Crocothemis servilia male

Scientific classification
- Kingdom: Animalia
- Phylum: Arthropoda
- Clade: Pancrustacea
- Class: Insecta
- Order: Odonata
- Infraorder: Anisoptera
- Superfamily: Libelluloidea
- Family: Libellulidae
- Subfamily: Sympetrinae
- Genus: Crocothemis; Brauer, 1868

= Crocothemis =

Genus of dragonflies

Crocothemis is a genus of dragonflies in the Libellulidae family, subfamily Sympetrinae (darters). Various species of this genus occur in southern Europe, Africa, Asia, Australia and the Southwest Pacific. They are generally small to medium-sized dragonflies.

These dragonflies are often noticed due to their colours. Males are generally very brightly coloured, ranging from totally red in several species, to the rich blue of Australia's C. nigrifrons. As with many Libellulid species, the females tend to be dull brown or orange.

Like most libellulids they tend to perch on sticks, reeds or stones near water, flying out to catch insects then returning to their perch.

== Etymology ==
The genus name Crocothemis is derived from the Greek κρόκος (krokos, "crocus", the source of saffron) and -themis, from Greek Θέμις (Themis), the goddess of divine law, order and justice. In early odonate taxonomy, names ending in -themis were introduced by Hagen and were widely used for dragonflies. The name refers to the amber colouration at the base of the wings.

== Species ==
The genus contains the following species:

Male	Female	Scientific name	Common name	Distribution
		Crocothemis brevistigma Pinhey, 1961	Spotted Scarlet	Ikelenge, Mwinilunga, Zambia
		Crocothemis chaldaeorum Morton, 1920		Bahrain; Iran; Iraq; Qatar; Saudi Arabia; Kuwait
		Crocothemis divisa Karsch, 1898	divisa scarlet, slender scarlet, slender scarlet-darter	tropical Sub-Saharan Africa, Madagascar
		Crocothemis erythraea (Brullé, 1832)	scarlet darter, broad scarlet	southern Europe and throughout Africa, western Asia as far as southern China
		Crocothemis nigrifrons (Kirby, 1894)	black-headed skimmer	Australia, Papua New Guinea, and the Solomon Islands.
		Crocothemis sanguinolenta (Burmeister, 1839)	little scarlet, slim scarlet-darter, small scarlet	Africa south of the Sahara (including Madagascar), in the Levant, and in the south of the Arabian Peninsula.
		Crocothemis saxicolor Ris, 1921	granite scarlet	Malawi, Mozambique, Zambia, Zimbabwe, possibly Liberia, and possibly Sierra Leone.
		Crocothemis servilia (Drury, 1773)	scarlet skimmer, oriental scarlet	east and southeast Asia
		Crocothemis striata Lohmann, 1981	Black-legged Scarlet	Madagascar
