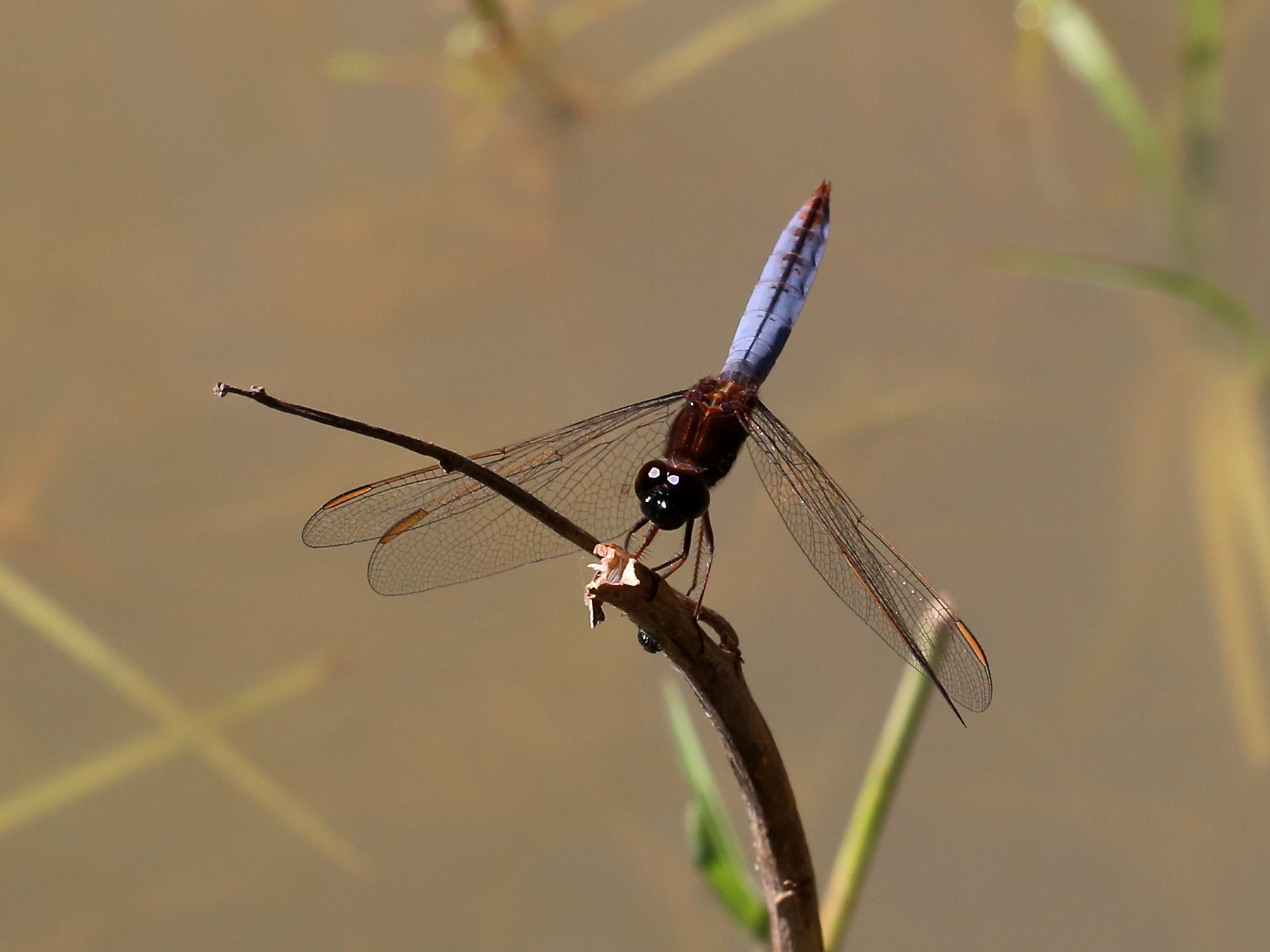
- Male
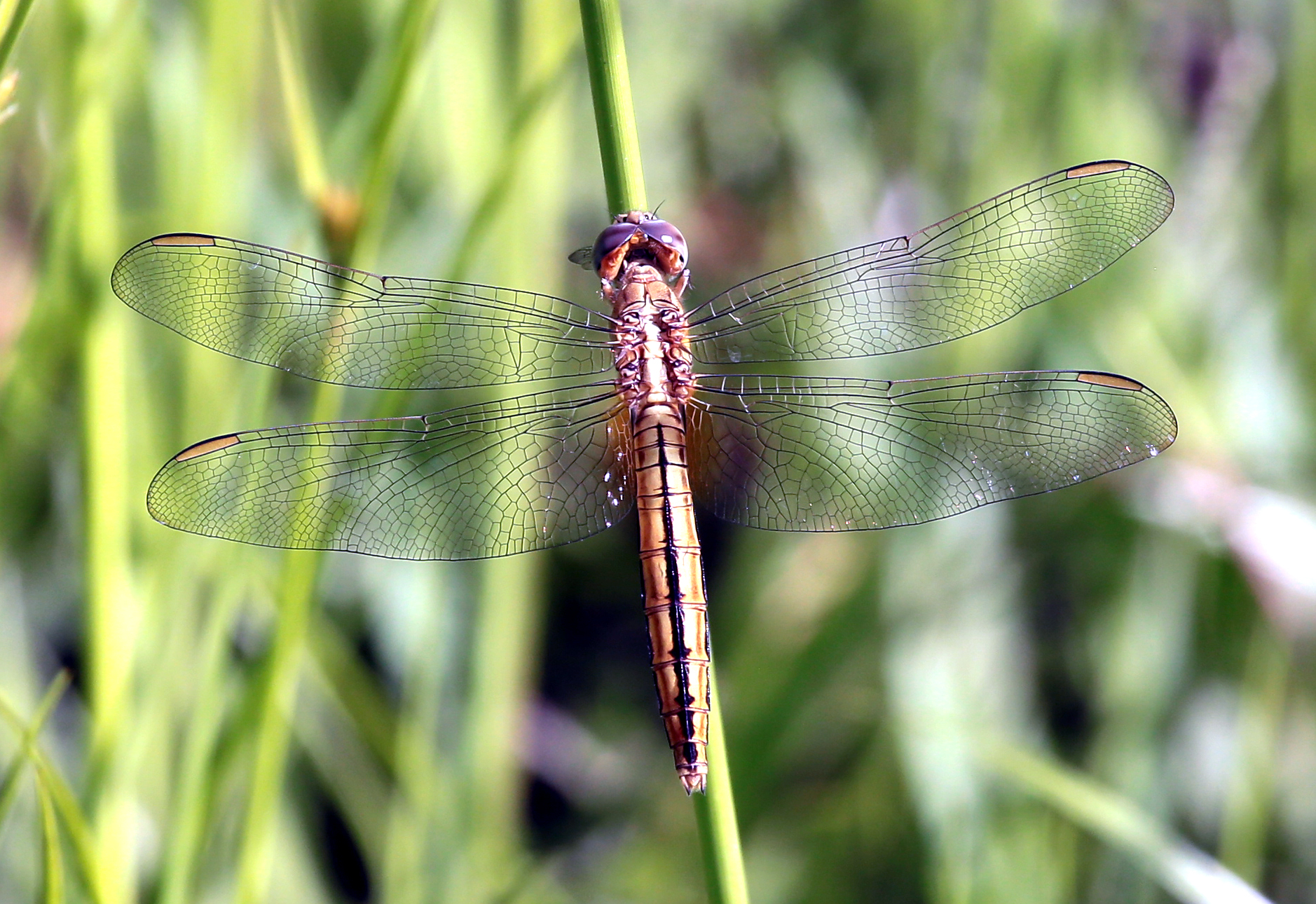
- Female

Conservation status
- Least Concern (IUCN 3.1)

Scientific classification
- Kingdom: Animalia
- Phylum: Arthropoda
- Clade: Pancrustacea
- Class: Insecta
- Order: Odonata
- Infraorder: Anisoptera
- Superfamily: Libelluloidea
- Family: Libellulidae
- Genus: Crocothemis
- Species: C. nigrifrons

Binomial name
- Crocothemis nigrifrons (Kirby, 1894)

Synonyms
- Orthetrum nigrifrons Kirby, 1894; Crocothemis papuana Förster, 1910

= Crocothemis nigrifrons =

Black-headed skimmer

Species of dragonfly

Crocothemis nigrifrons is a species of dragonfly in the family Libellulidae. Its common names include black-headed skimmer and blue-scarlet dragonfly. It is found in Australia, Papua New Guinea, and the Solomon Islands.

The male is blue and black, and the female is yellow to brown in color.

The species is usually found near still or sluggish waters and is common over much of its range.

== Etymology ==
The genus name Crocothemis is derived from the Greek κρόκος (krokos, "crocus", the source of saffron) and -themis, from Greek Θέμις (Themis), the goddess of divine law, order and justice. In early odonate taxonomy, names ending in -themis were widely used for dragonflies. The name refers to the amber coloration at the base of the wings.

The species name nigrifrons is derived from the Latin niger ("black") and frons ("forehead" or "brow"), referring to the black face.

== Gallery ==
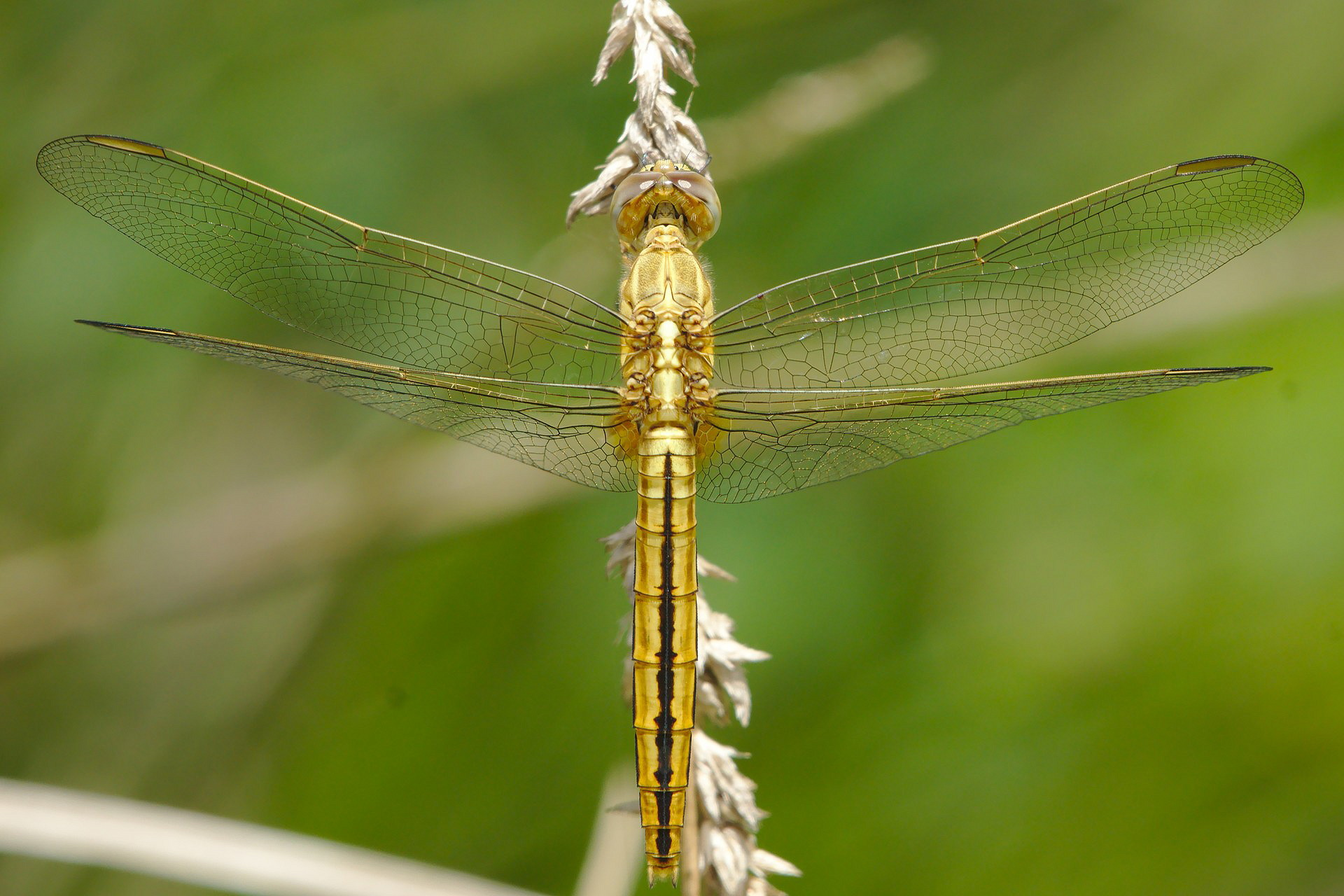
Young female

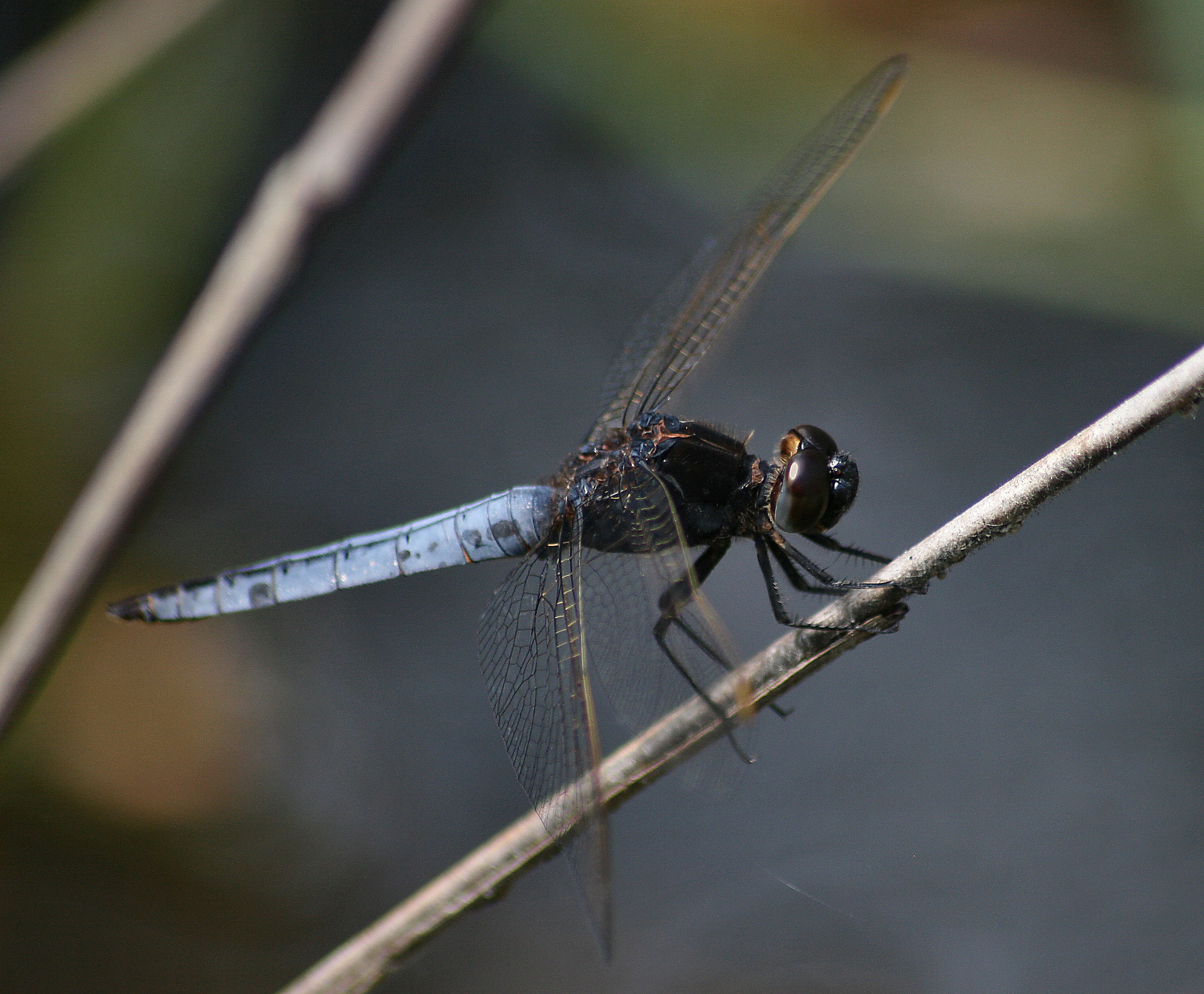
Male

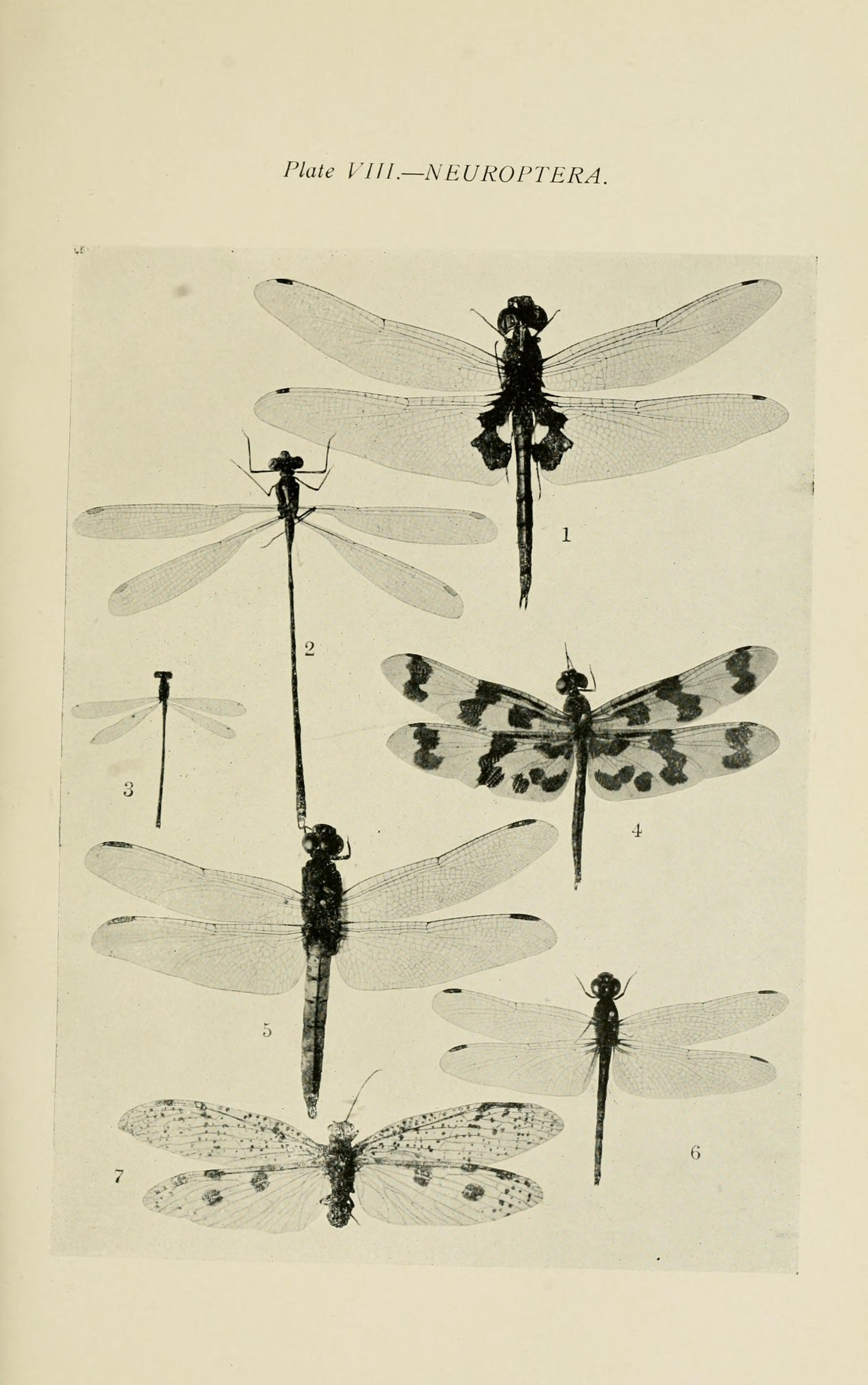
5. Orthetrum nigrifrons (previous name) in: Australian insects (1907) Walter W. Froggatt.

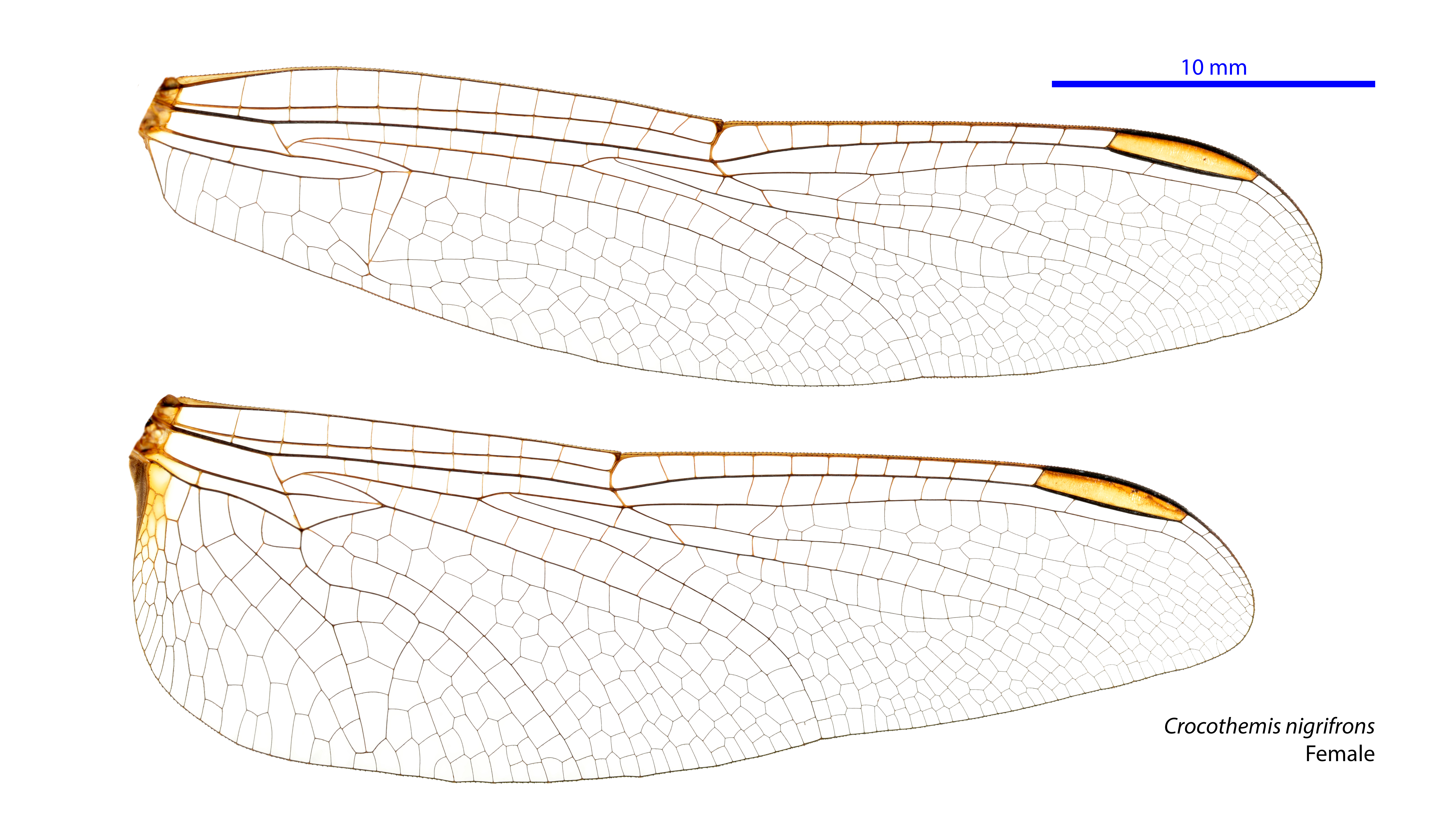
Female wings

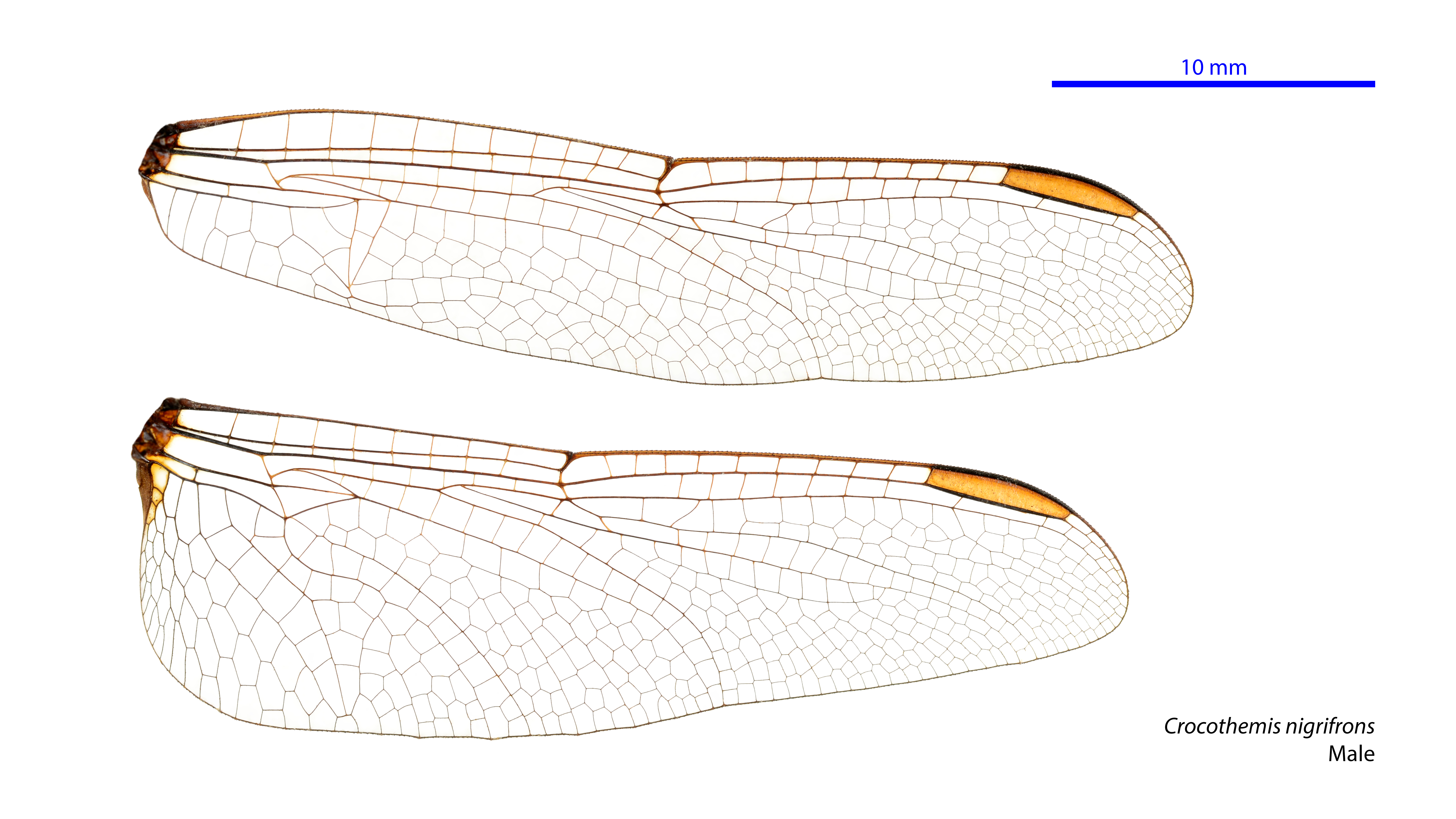
Male wings

== See also ==
- List of Odonata species of Australia
