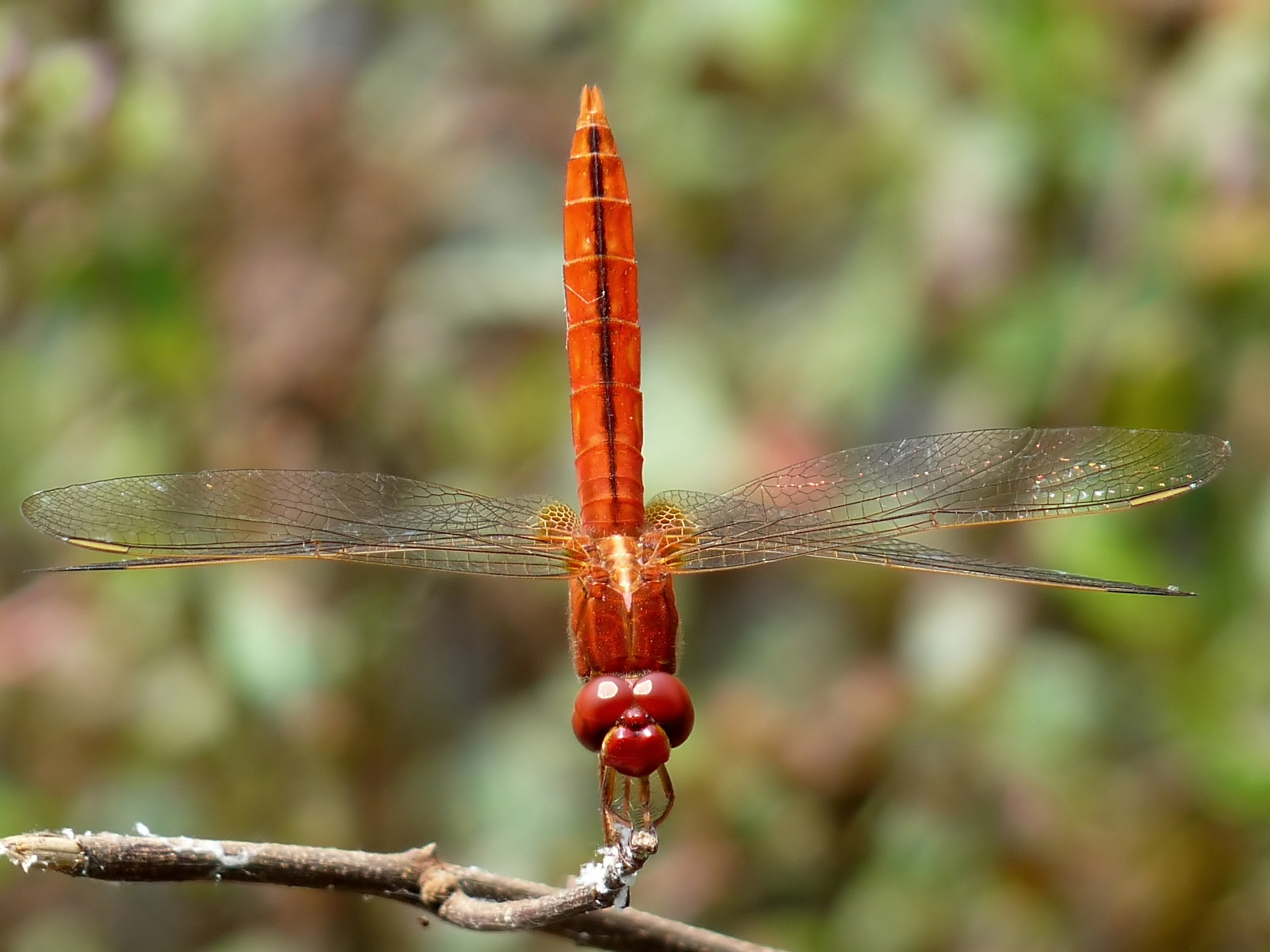
- C. s. servilia, male
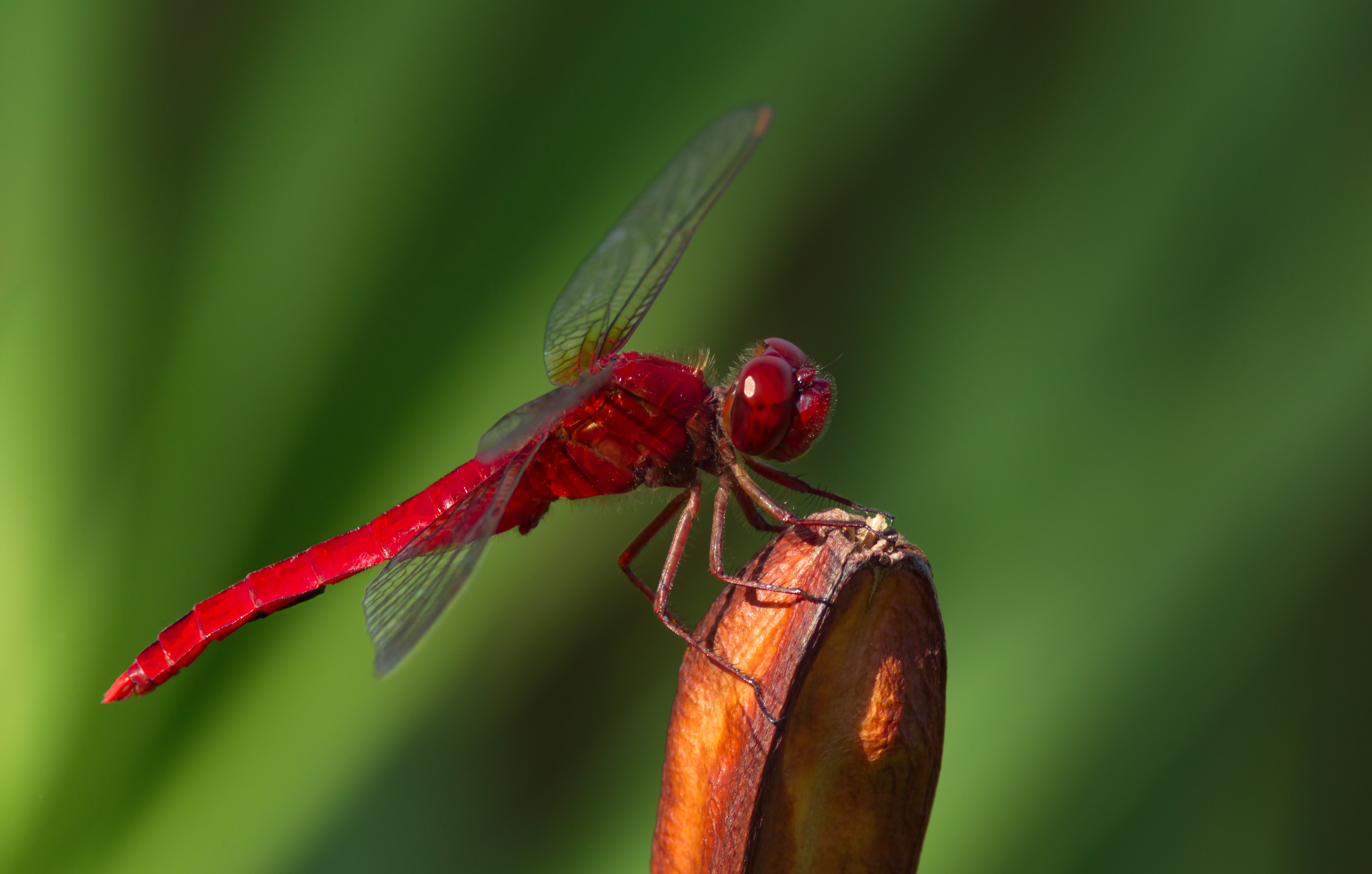
- C. s. mariannae, male

Conservation status
- Least Concern (IUCN 3.1)

Scientific classification
- Kingdom: Animalia
- Phylum: Arthropoda
- Clade: Pancrustacea
- Class: Insecta
- Order: Odonata
- Infraorder: Anisoptera
- Superfamily: Libelluloidea
- Family: Libellulidae
- Genus: Crocothemis
- Species: C. servilia

Binomial name
- Crocothemis servilia (Drury, 1773)

Synonyms
- Libellula ferruginea Fabricius, 1793; Libellula servilia Drury, 1773; Libellula soror Rambur, 1842

= Scarlet skimmer =

Species of dragonfly

The scarlet skimmer or ruddy marsh skimmer (Crocothemis servilia) is a species of dragonfly of the family Libellulidae, native to east and southeast Asia and introduced to Jamaica, Florida, and Hawaii.

== Subspecies ==
There are two known subspecies: Crocothemis servilia servilia (Drury, 1773) and Crocothemis servilia mariannae Kiauta, 1983. C. s. mariannae lacks the mid-dorsal black stripe.

== Description and habitat ==
It is a medium sized dragonfly. The male is blood-red, with a thin black line along the mid-dorsal abdomen in the nominate subspecies. Its eyes are blood-red above, purple laterally. Thorax is bright ferruginous, often blood-red on dorsum. Anal appendages are blood-red. Female is similar to the male, but with olivaceous-brown thorax and abdomen. The black mid-dorsal carina is rather broad.

It breeds in ponds, ditches, marshes, open swamps and rice fields.

== Gallery ==
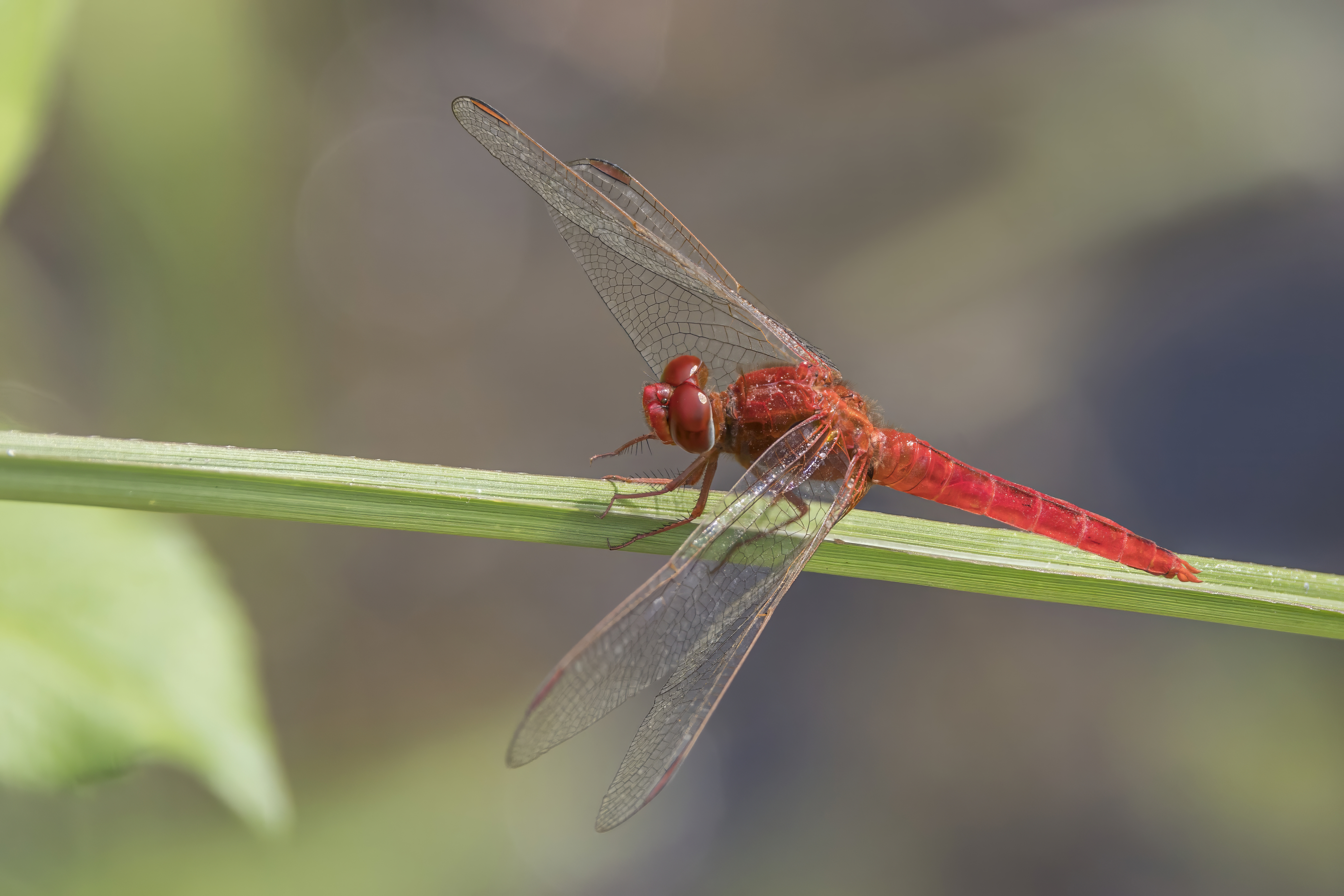
Male, Laos

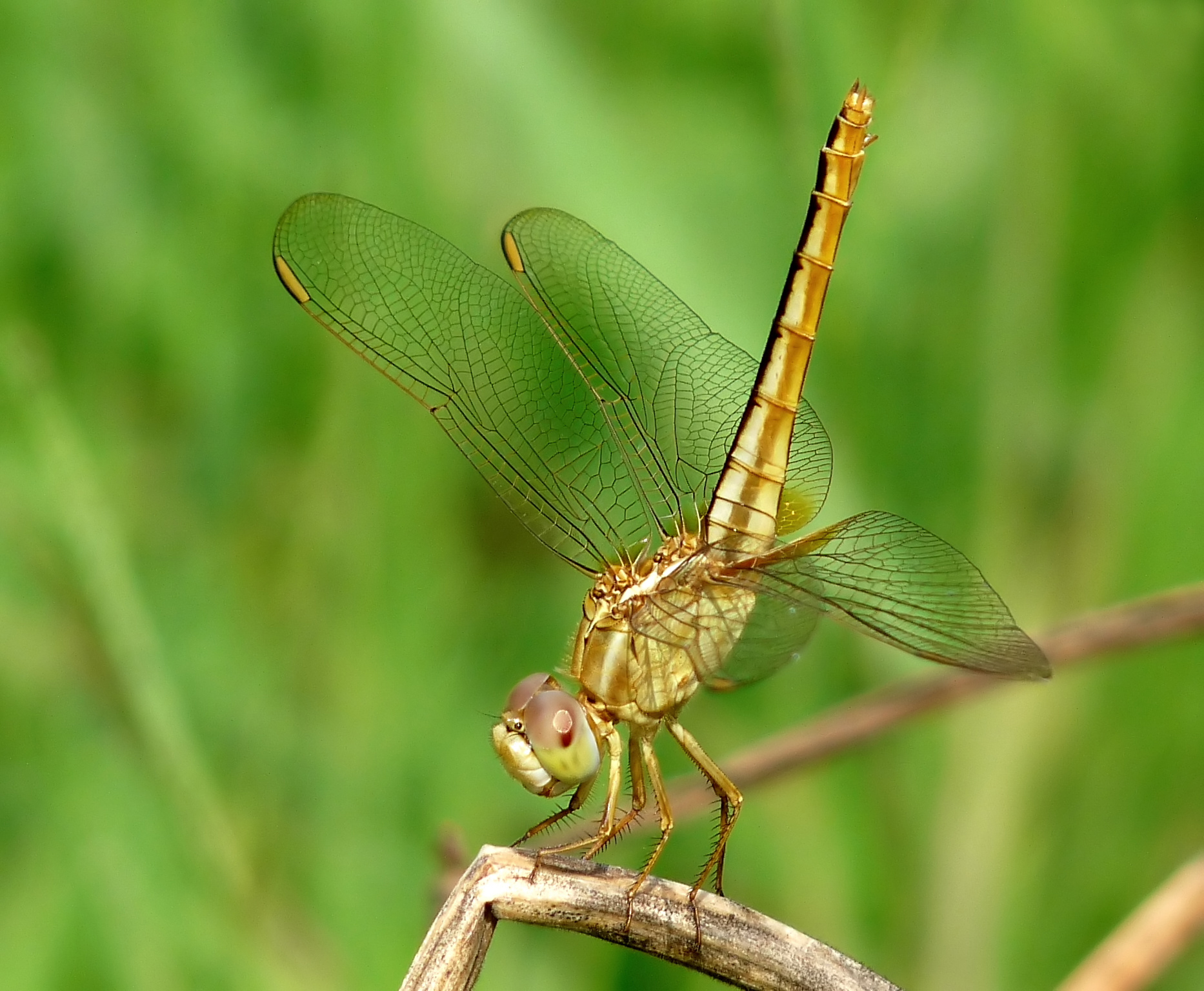
Female

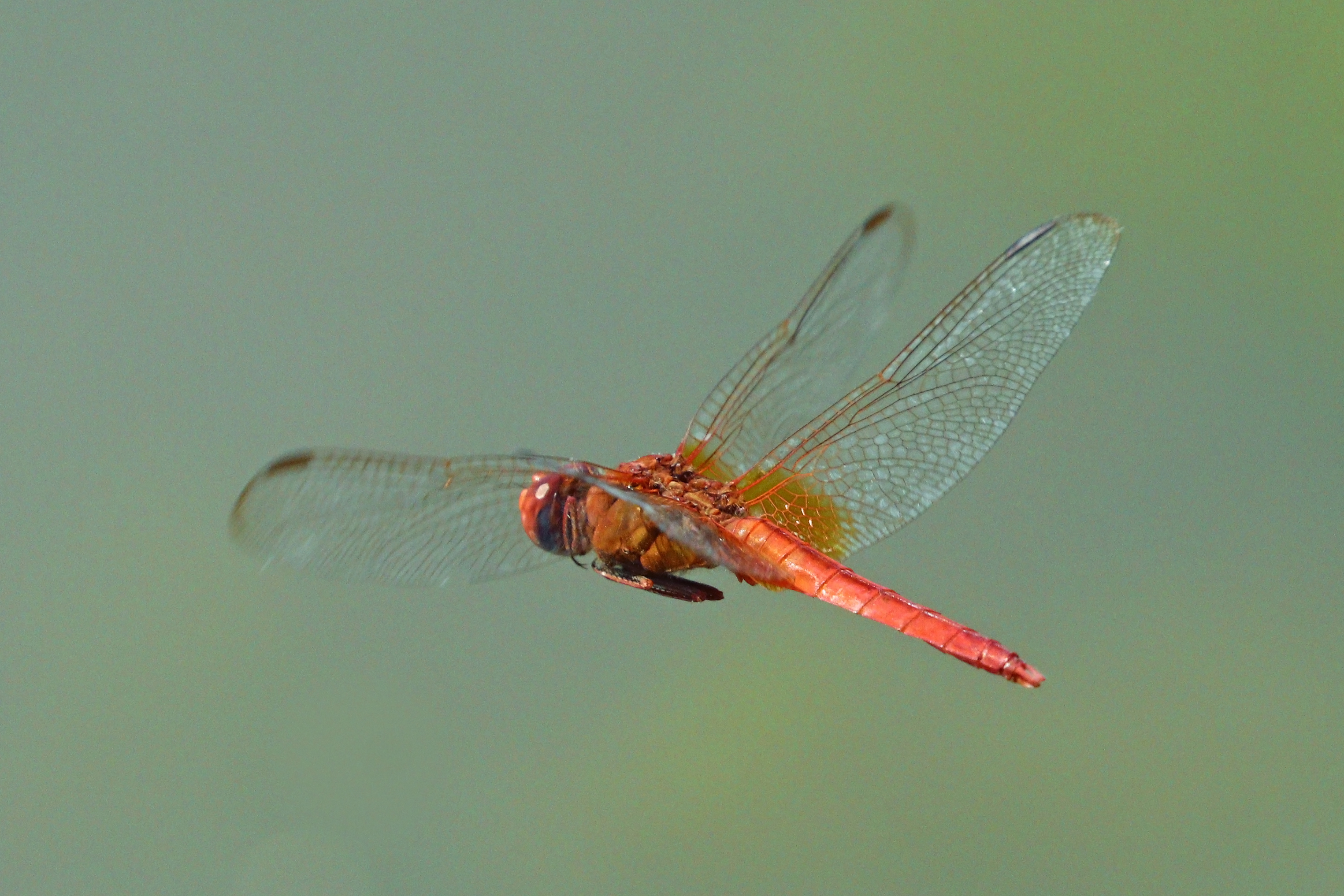
Subadult male in flight

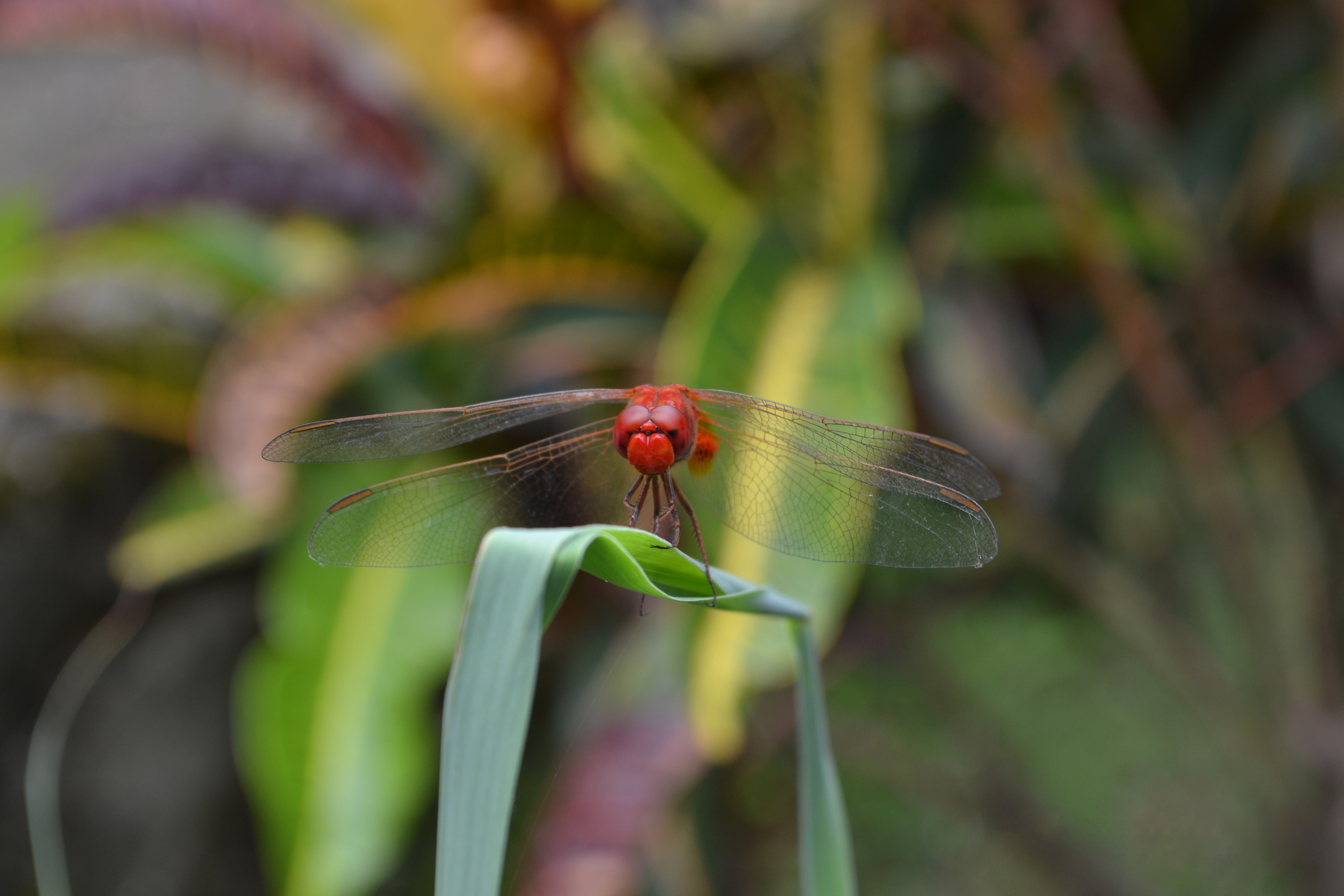
A scarlet skimmer in Uttarakhand, India

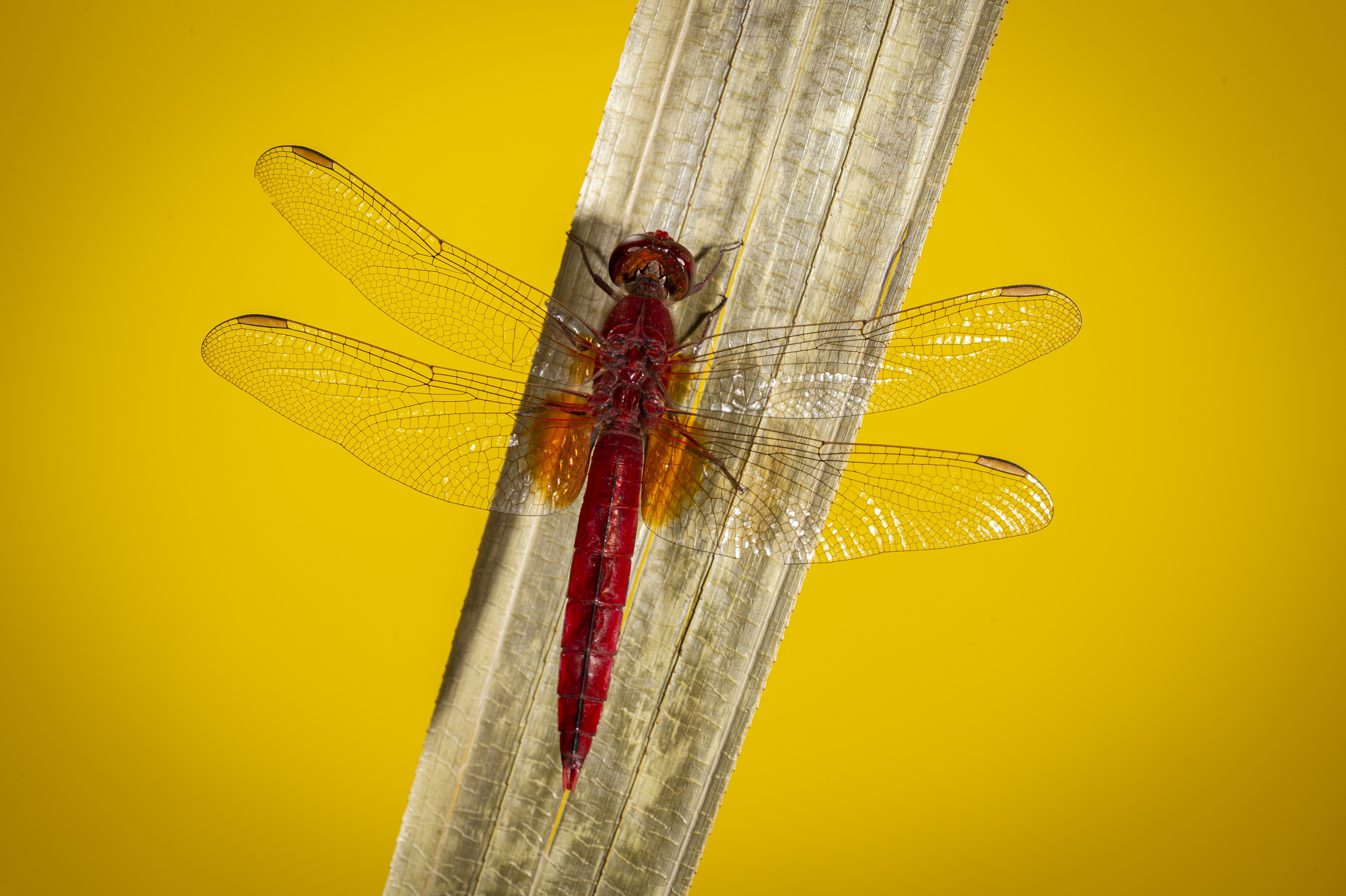
Crocothemis servilia servilia, Adult

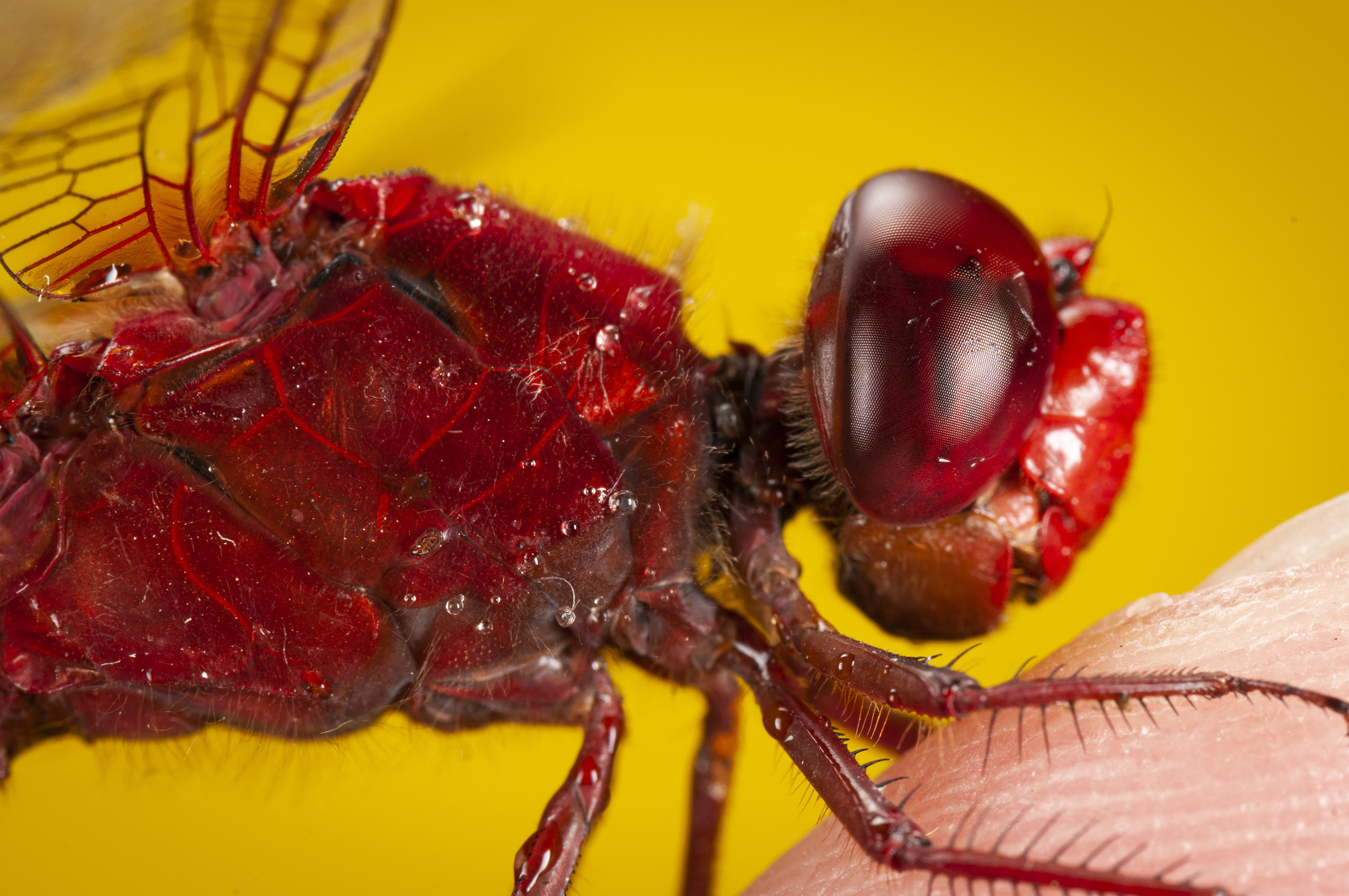
Crocothemis servilia servilia, Adult

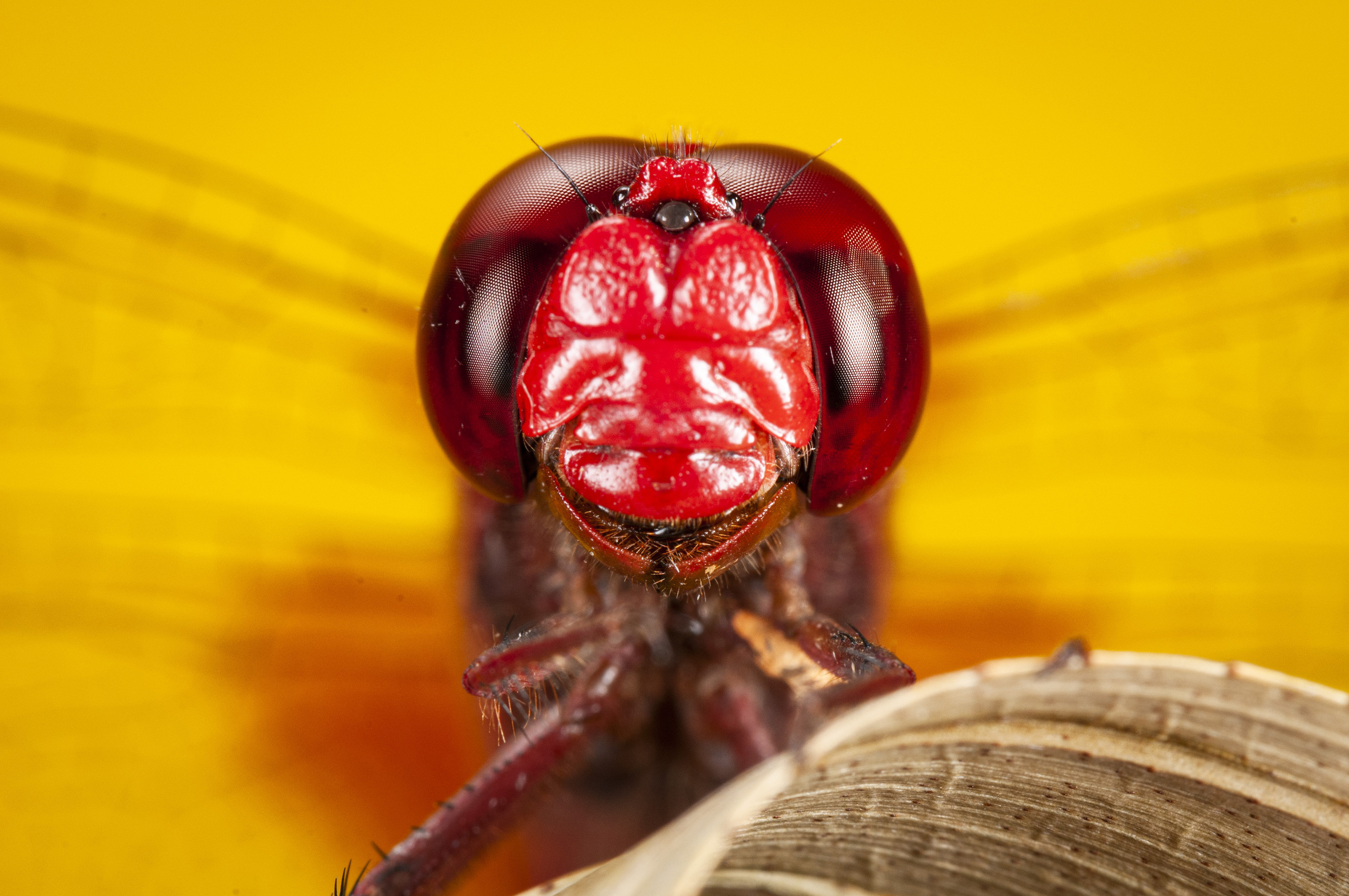
Crocothemis servilia servilia, Adult

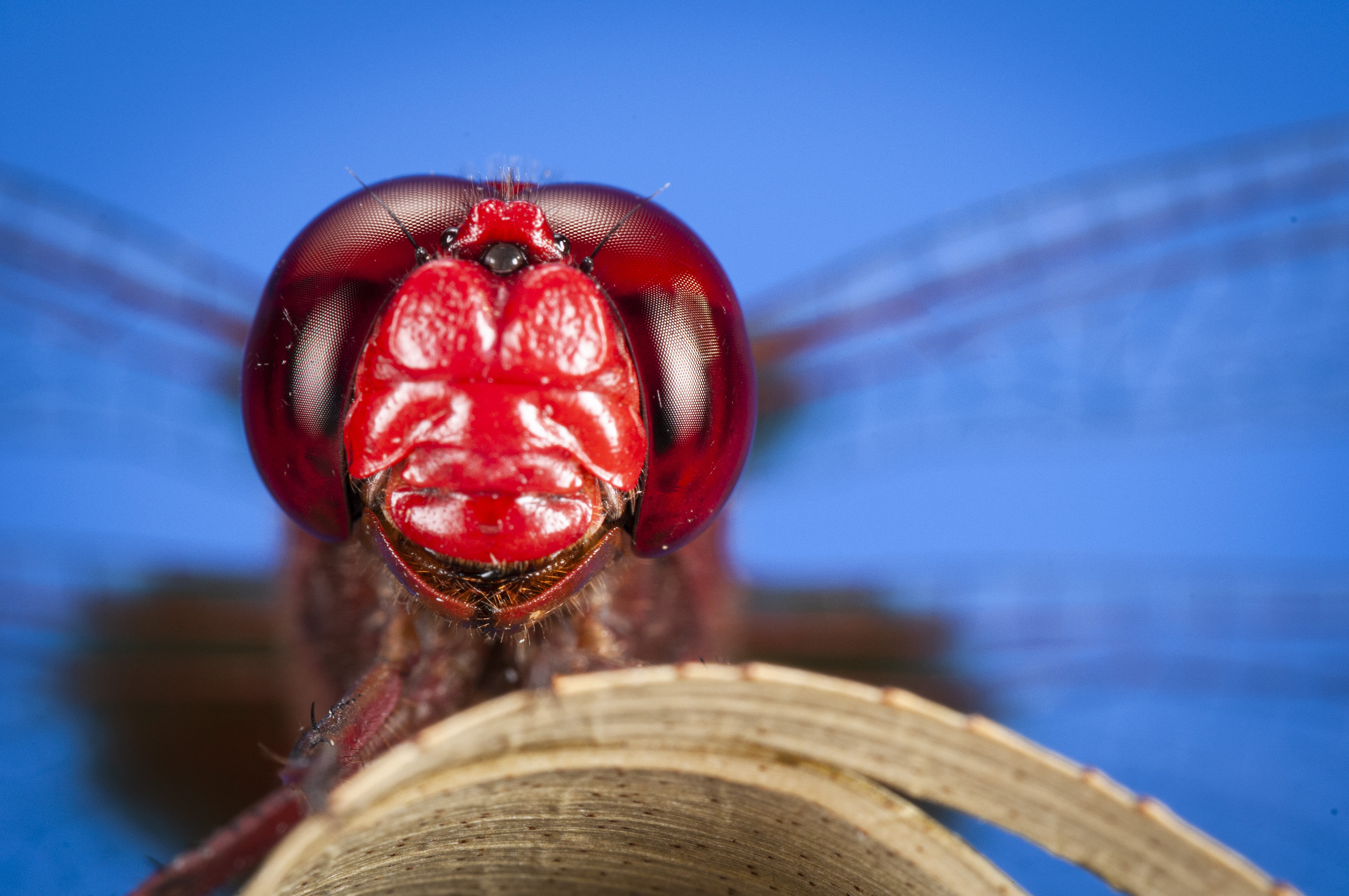
Crocothemis servilia servilia, Adult

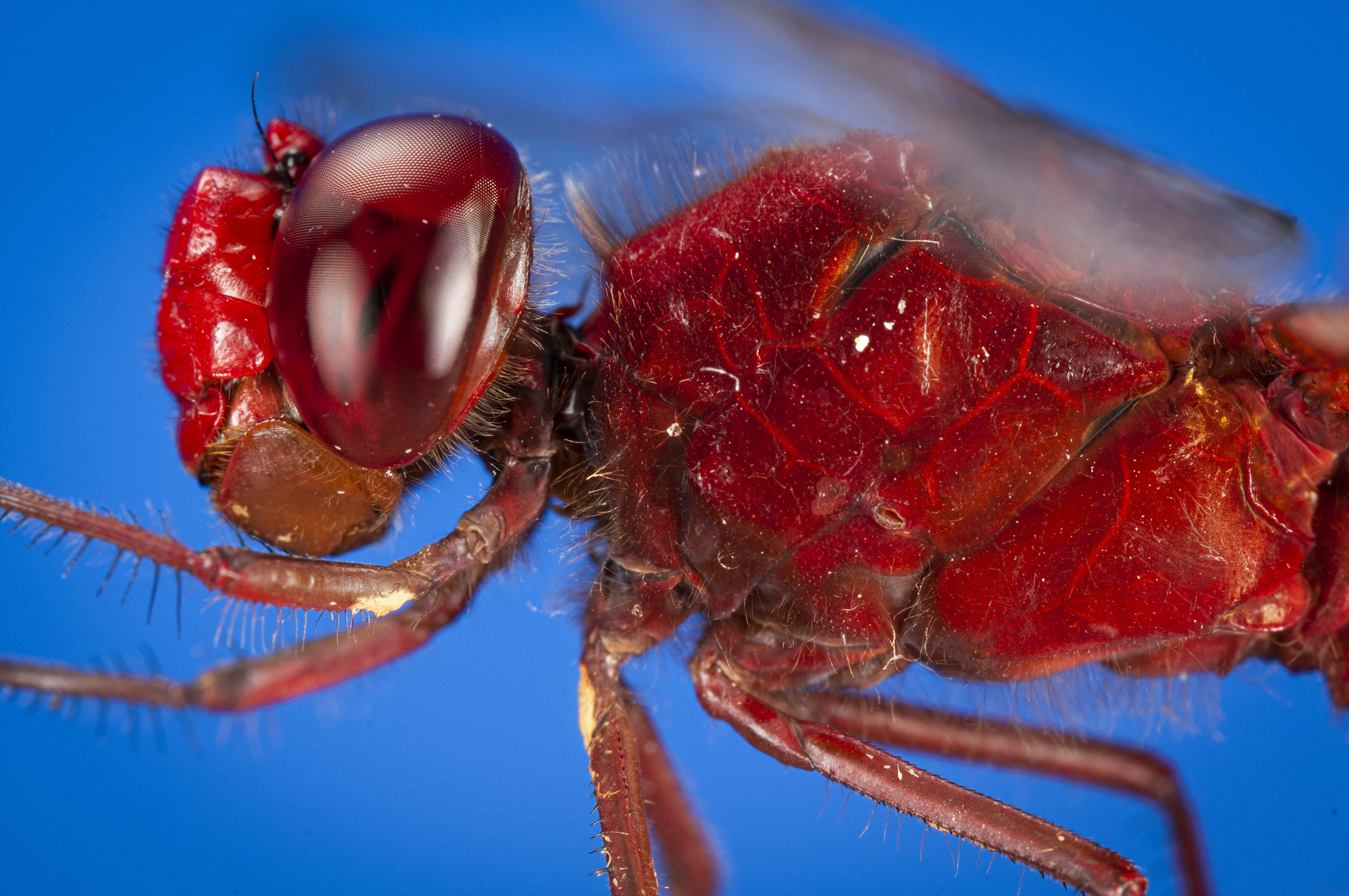
Crocothemis servilia servilia, Adult

== See also ==
- List of odonates of Sri Lanka
- List of odonates of India
- List of odonata of Kerala
