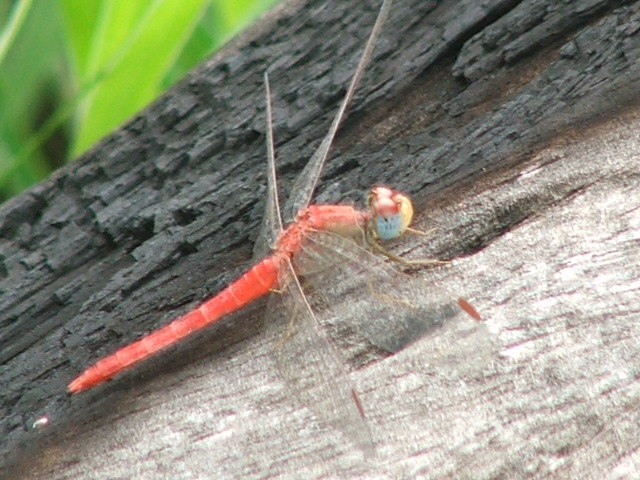
- Male
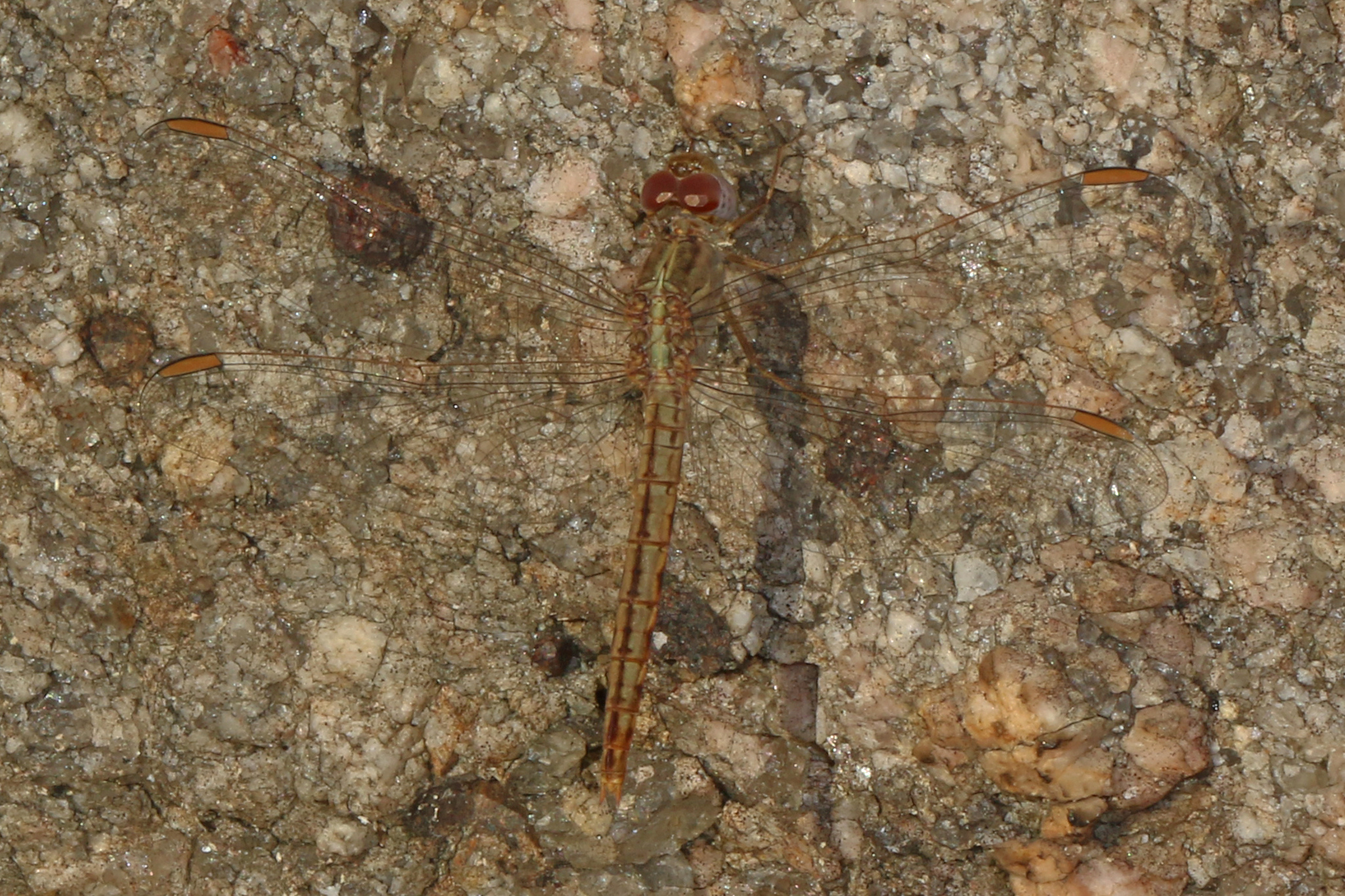
- Female in Madagascar

Conservation status
- Least Concern (IUCN 3.1)

Scientific classification
- Kingdom: Animalia
- Phylum: Arthropoda
- Class: Insecta
- Order: Odonata
- Infraorder: Anisoptera
- Family: Libellulidae
- Genus: Crocothemis
- Species: C. divisa

Binomial name
- Crocothemis divisa Baumann, 1898

= Crocothemis divisa =

Species of dragonfly

Crocothemis divisa, commonly known as rock scarlet, is a species of dragonfly in the family Libellulidae. It is a widespread through much of tropical Sub-Saharan Africa where its natural habitats include pools and streams in woodland and bush. It may occasionally disperse as far as South Africa and Namibia (only one record from each country).
