= Crocothemis striata =

Scientific classification
- Domain: Eukaryota
- Kingdom: Animalia
- Phylum: Arthropoda
- Class: Insecta
- Order: Odonata
- Infraorder: Anisoptera
- Family: Libellulidae
- Genus: Crocothemis
- Species: C. striata

Binomial name
- Crocothemis striata Lohmann, 1981

Species of insect

Crocothemis striata, the black-legged scarlet, is a species of dragonfly found in Madagascar.
