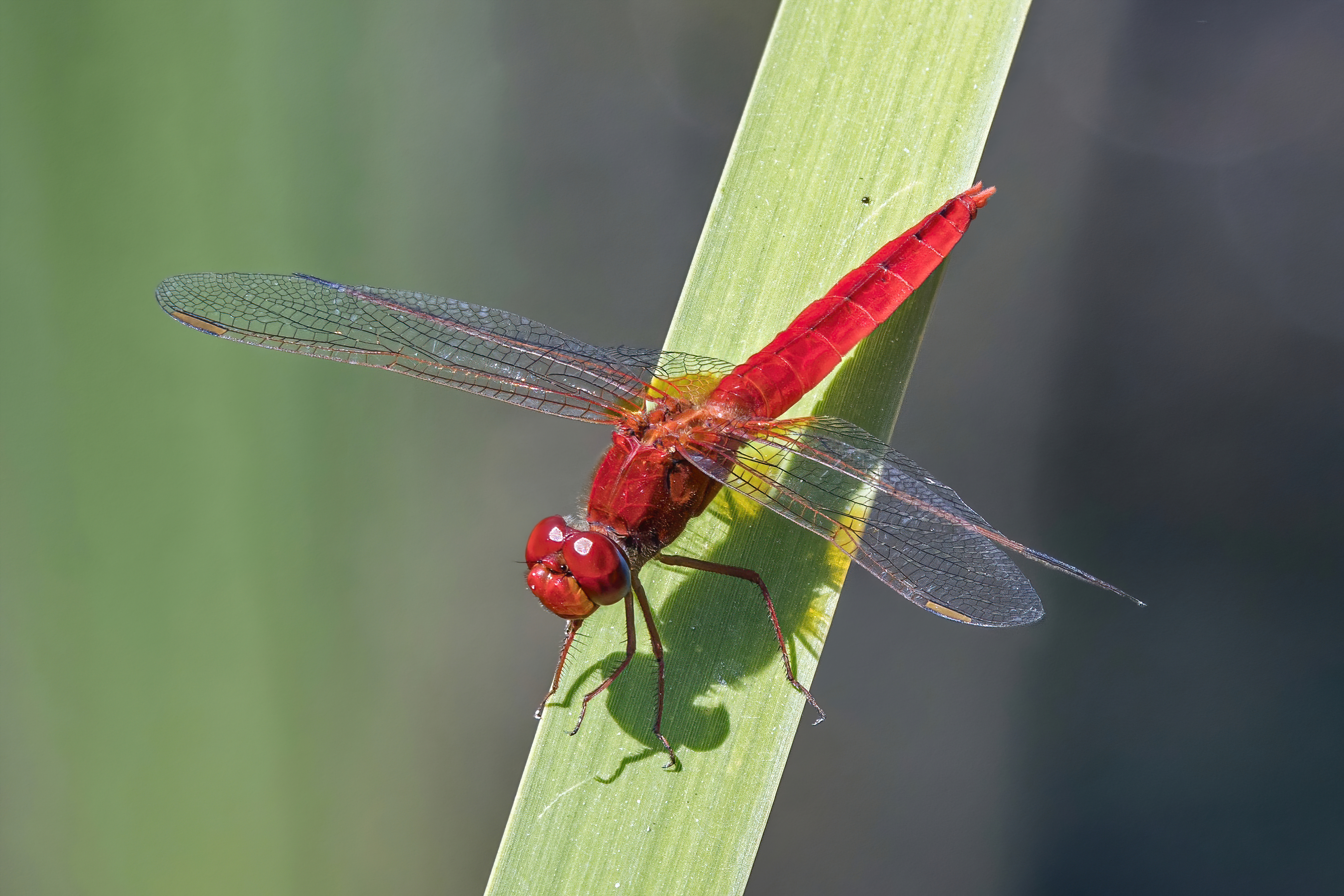
- Male, Cyprus
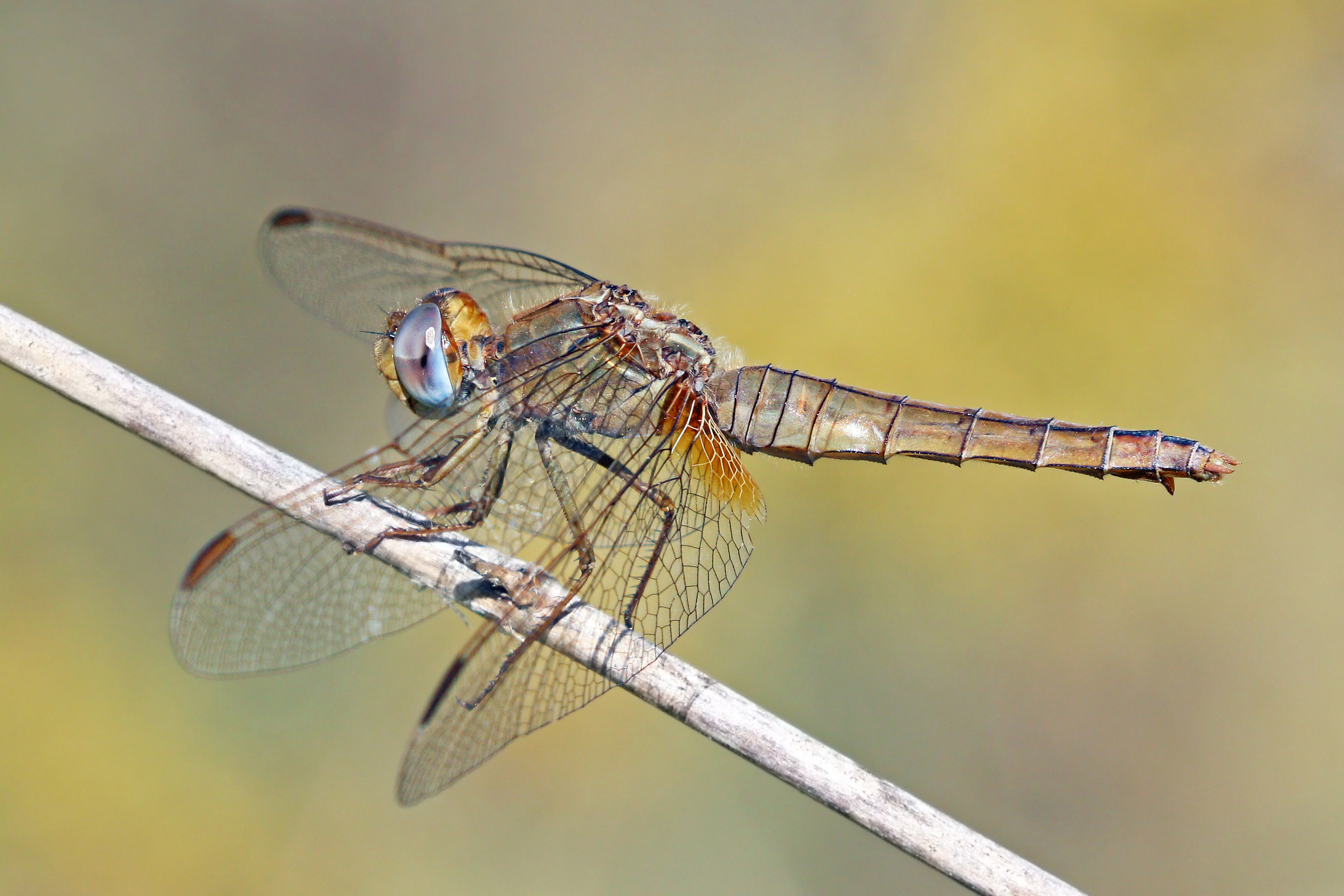
- Female, Bulgaria

Conservation status
- Least Concern (IUCN 3.1)

Scientific classification
- Kingdom: Animalia
- Phylum: Arthropoda
- Clade: Pancrustacea
- Class: Insecta
- Order: Odonata
- Infraorder: Anisoptera
- Family: Libellulidae
- Genus: Crocothemis
- Species: C. erythraea

Binomial name
- Crocothemis erythraea (Brullé, 1832)

= Scarlet dragonfly =

Species of dragonfly

The scarlet dragonfly (Crocothemis erythraea) is a species of dragonfly in the family Libellulidae. Its common names include broad scarlet, common scarlet-darter, and scarlet darter.

== Status and distribution ==
The scarlet dragonfly is a common species in southern Europe and throughout Africa. It also occurs across western Asia as far as southern China. It is a very rare vagrant in Britain. Its first record in the country was at Hayle Kimbro Pool, The Lizard, Cornwall, on 7 August 1995. Since then there have been a few further records at scattered coastal or near-coastal locations in southeastern England from Dorset to Norfolk.

== Habitat ==
A wide range of both running and standing waters, except those that are shaded. Adults may be found some distance from water in habitats ranging from desert to open woodland; absent from dense forest.

== Description ==
Crocothemis erythraea can reach a length of 33–44 millimetres (1.3–1.7 in). These dragonflies haves a flattened and rather broad abdomen. The adult male scarlet dragonfly has a bright scarlet red, widened abdomen, with small amber patches at the bases of the hindwings. Also the veins on the leading edges of the wings are red. Females and immatures are yellow-brown and have a conspicuous pale stripe along the top of the thorax.

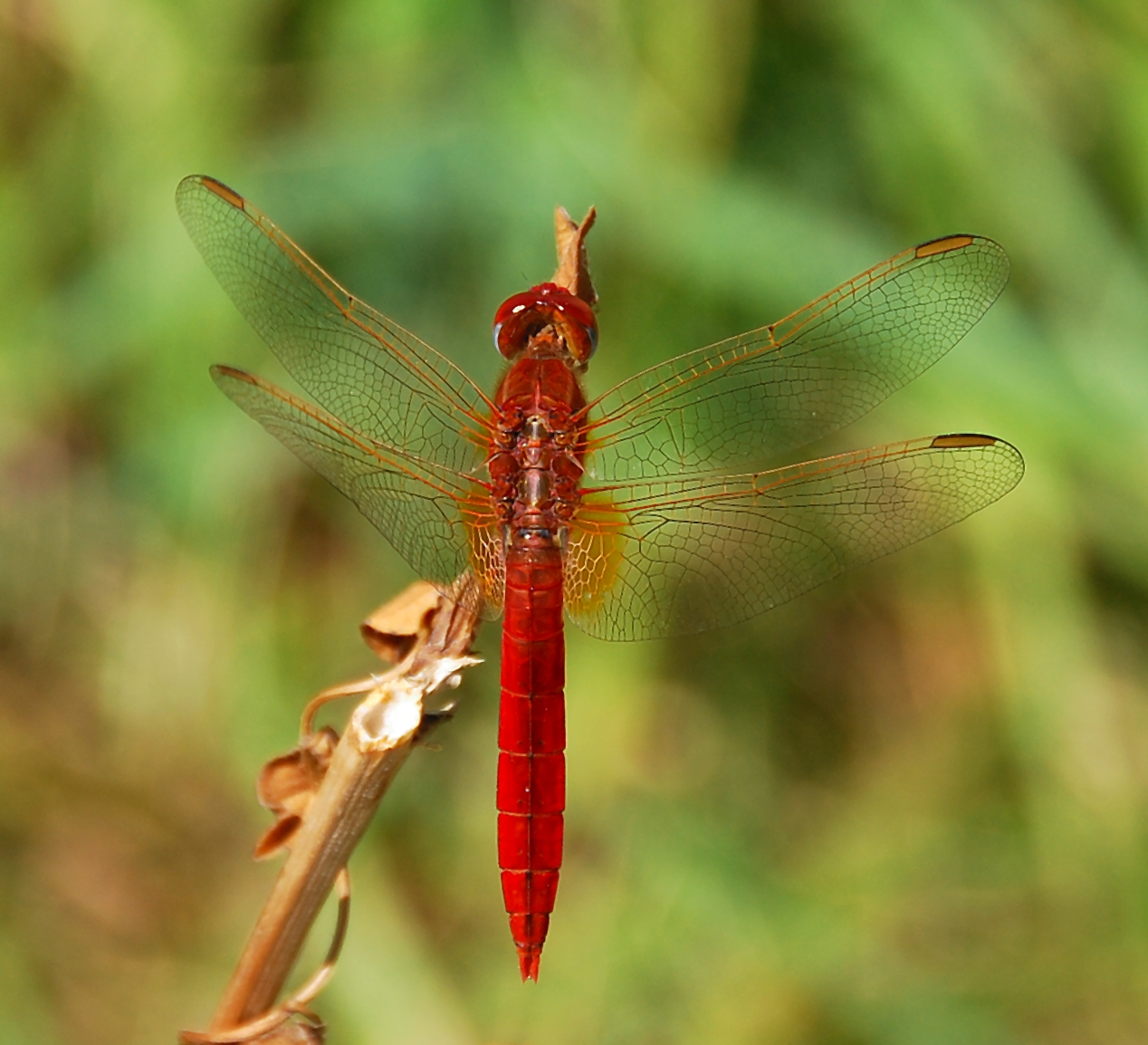
male

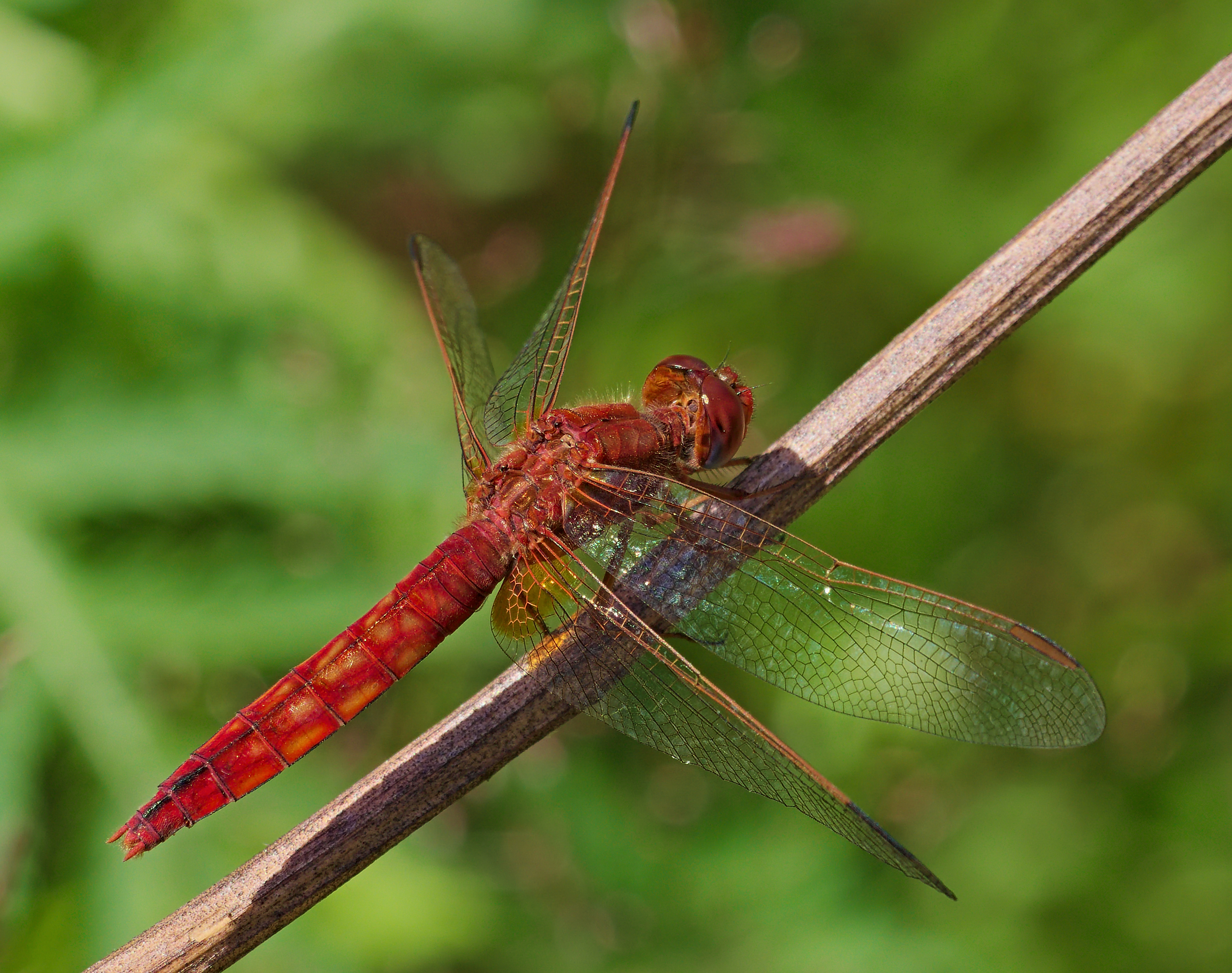
red female

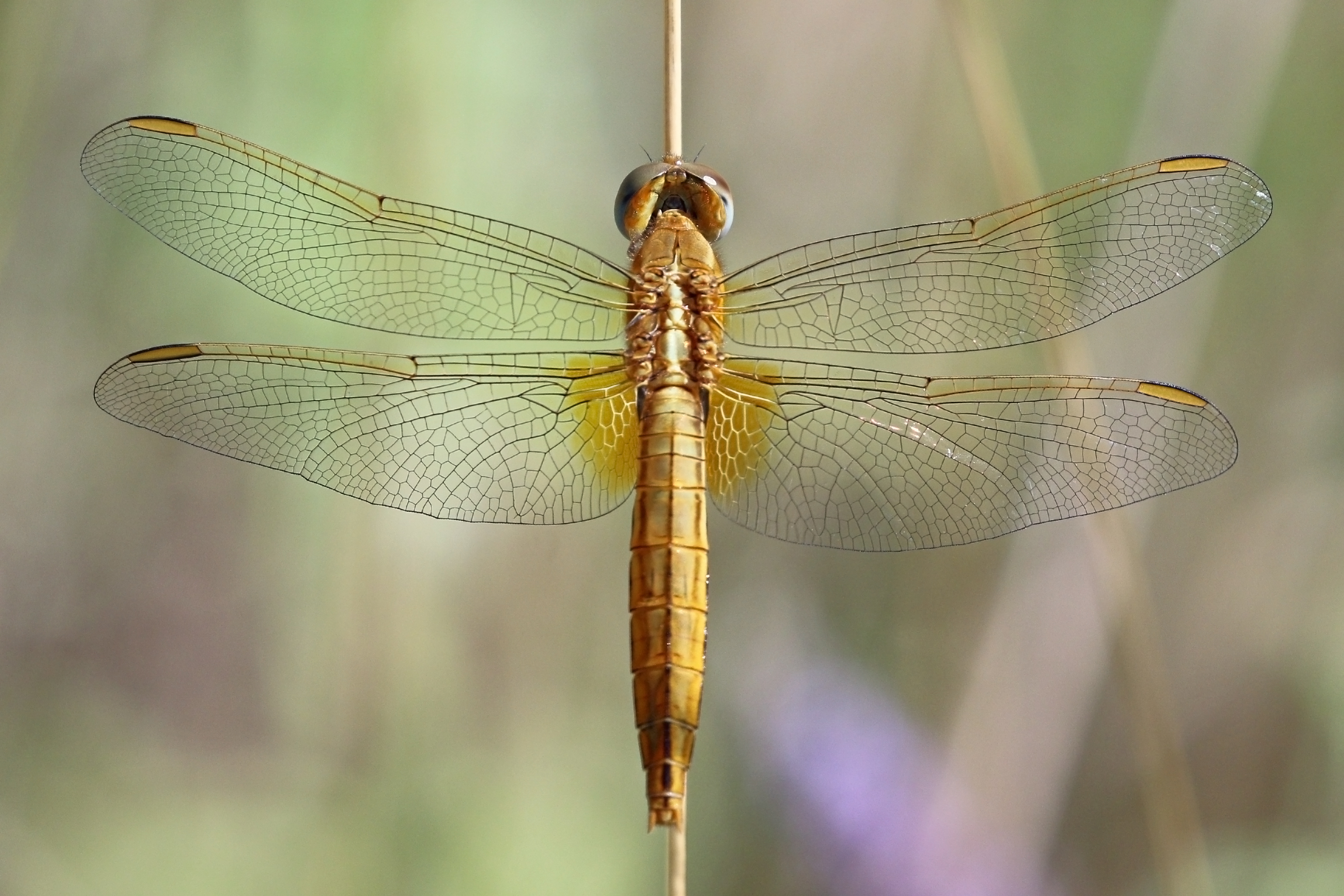
female

Clip
