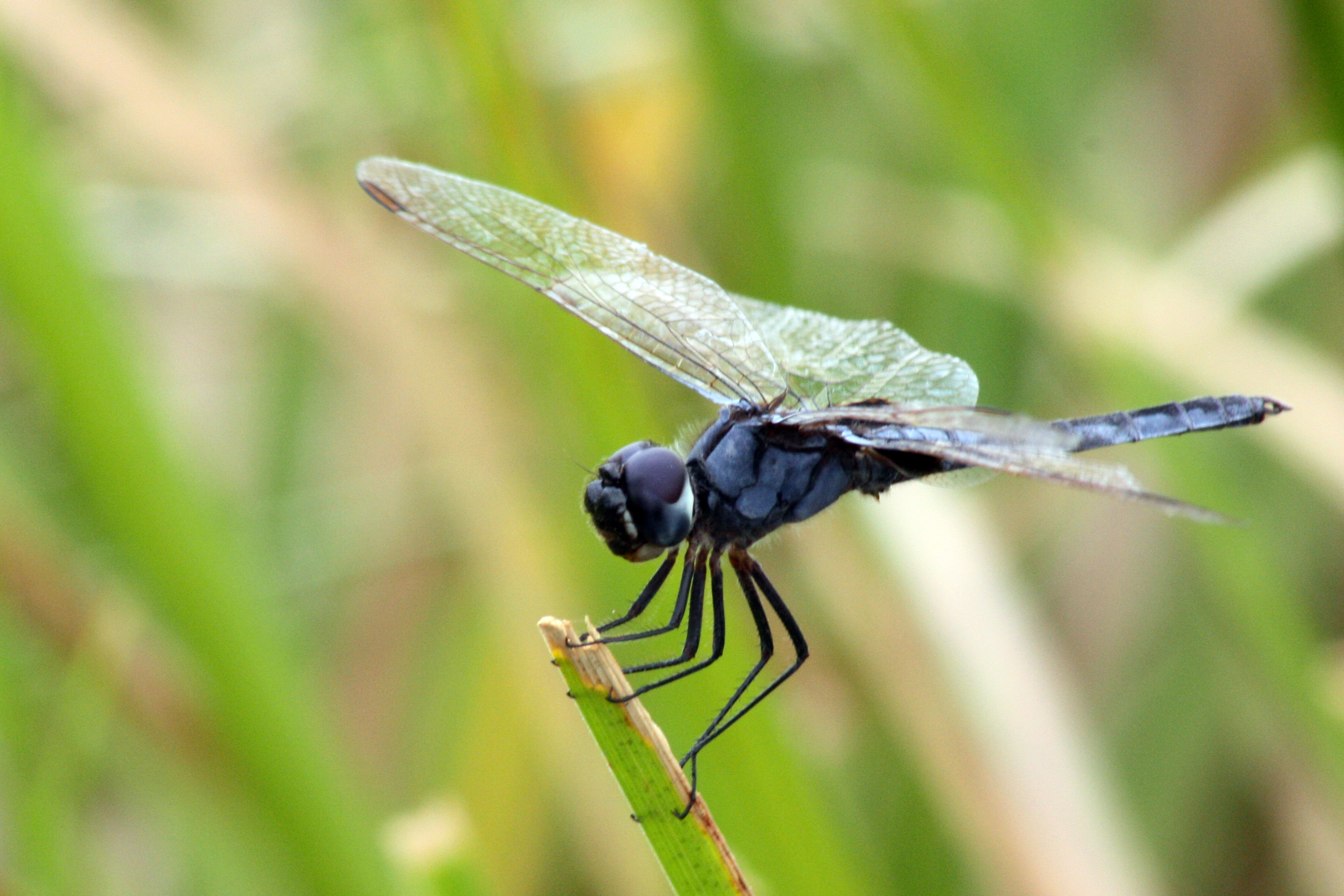
- Male in the Okavango Delta, Botswana

Conservation status
- Least Concern (IUCN 3.1)

Scientific classification
- Kingdom: Animalia
- Phylum: Arthropoda
- Clade: Pancrustacea
- Class: Insecta
- Order: Odonata
- Infraorder: Anisoptera
- Family: Libellulidae
- Genus: Urothemis
- Species: U. edwardsii

Binomial name
- Urothemis edwardsii (Selys, 1849)

= Urothemis edwardsii =

Species of dragonfly

Urothemis edwardsii, the blue basker, is a species of dragonfly in the family Libellulidae. It is found in Algeria, Angola, Benin, Botswana, Burkina Faso, Cameroon, Chad, the Democratic Republic of the Congo, Ivory Coast, Egypt, Gambia, Ghana, Guinea, Kenya, Liberia, Malawi, Mali, Mauritania, Mozambique, Namibia, Niger, Nigeria, Senegal, Sierra Leone, Somalia, South Africa, Sudan, Tanzania, Uganda, Zambia, Zimbabwe, and possibly Burundi. Its natural habitats are freshwater lakes, intermittent freshwater lakes, freshwater marshes, and intermittent freshwater marshes.

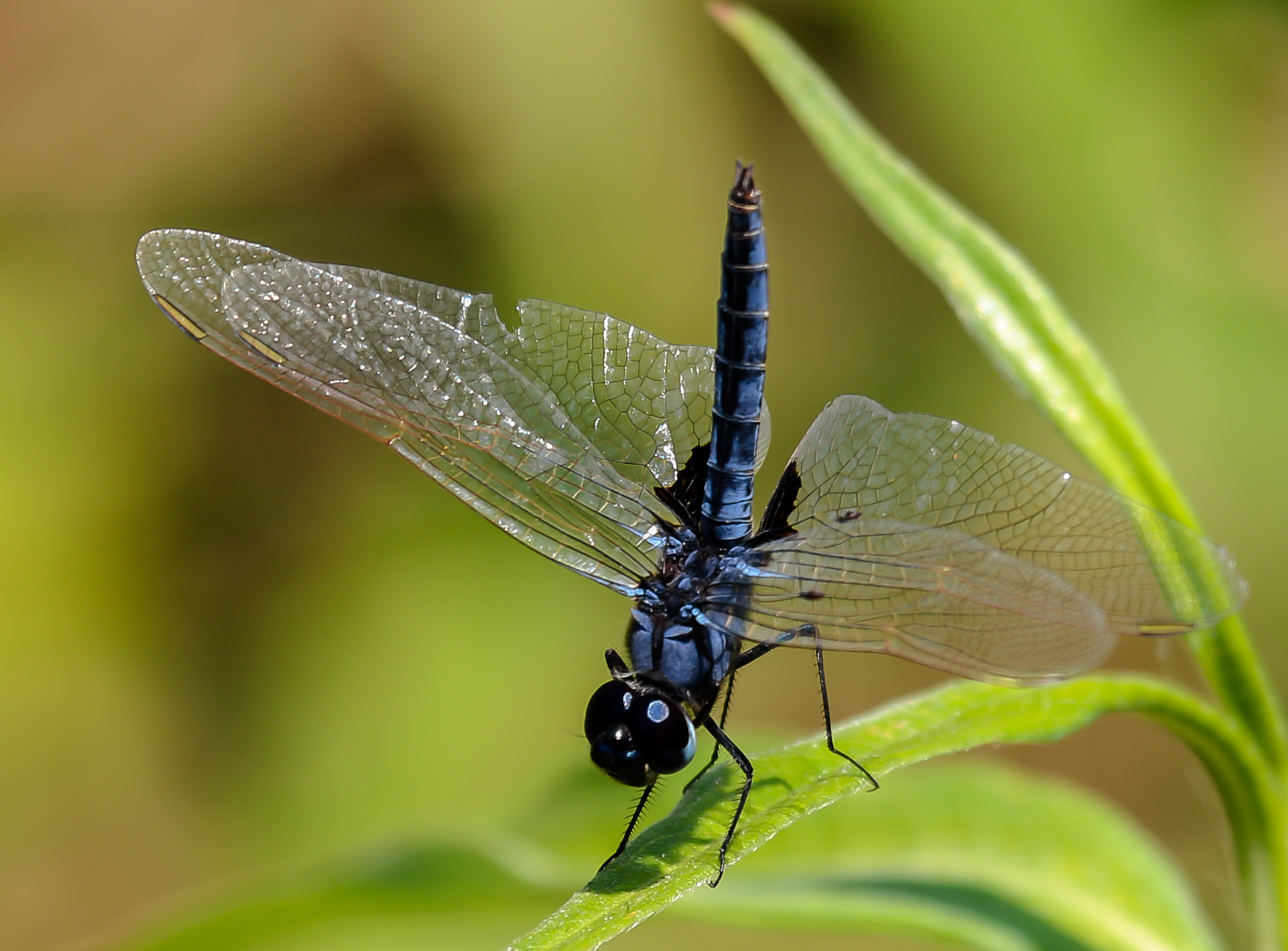
Male in obelisk posture; Kasane area, Botswana

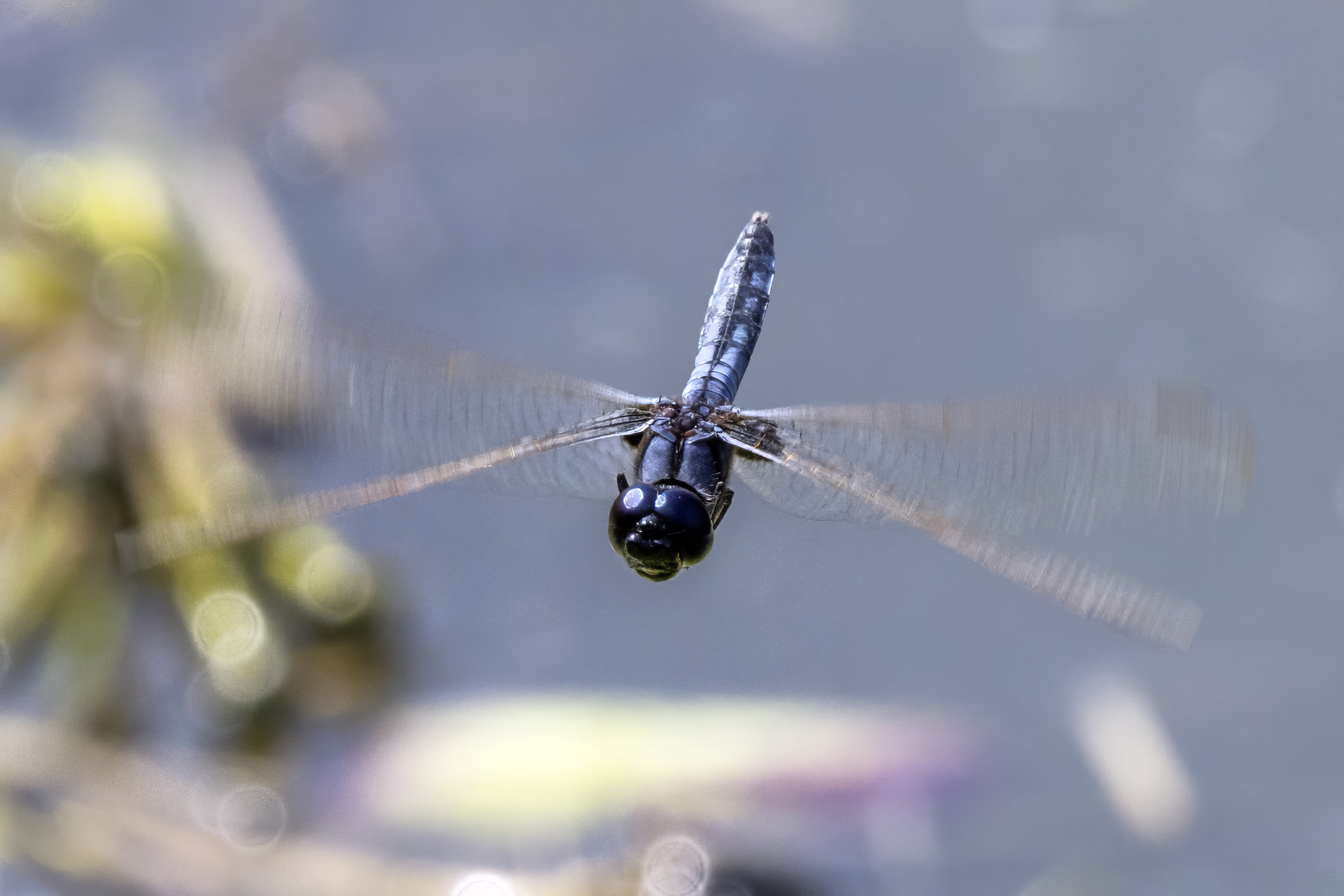
male in Kruger National Park

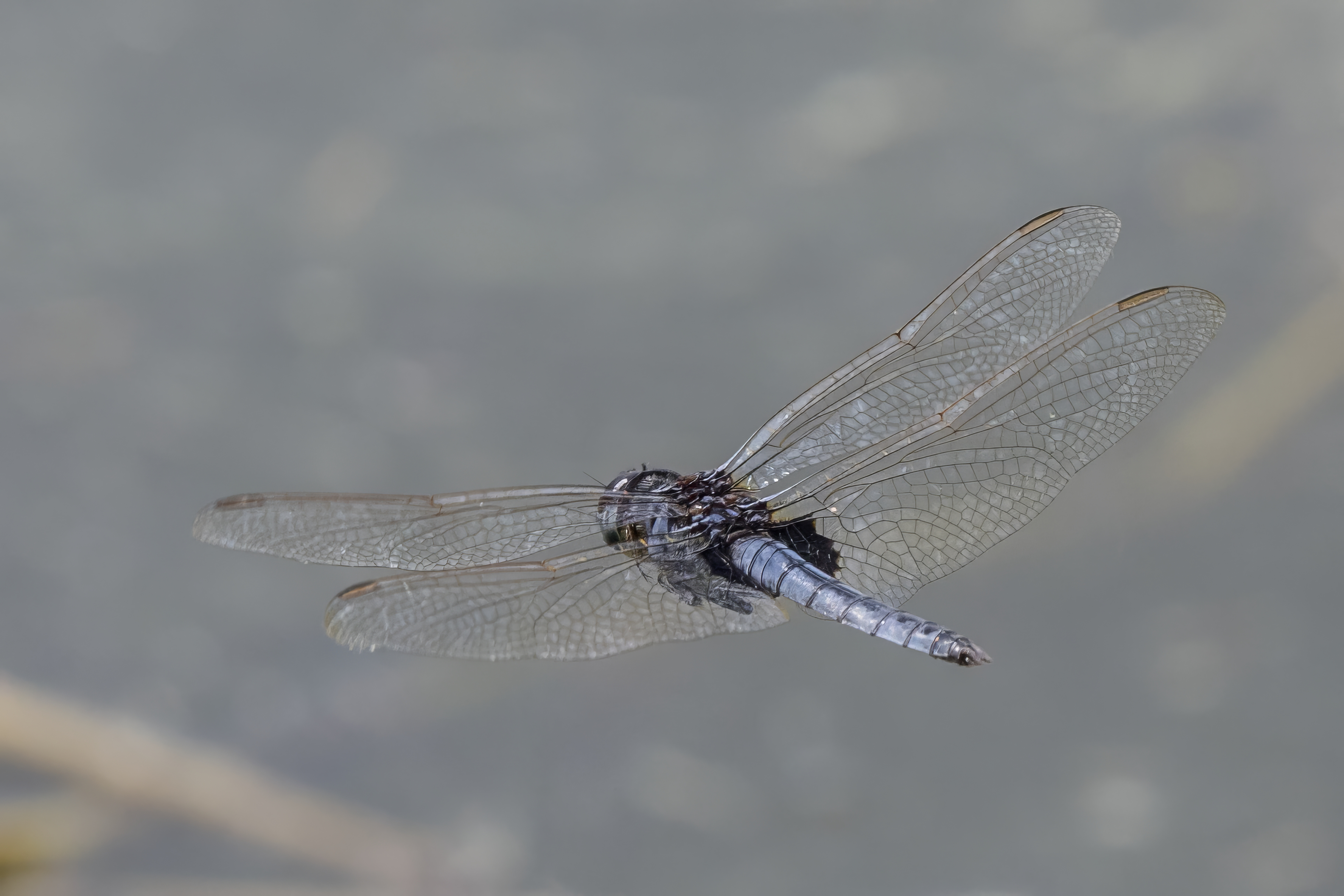
male in Kruger National Park
