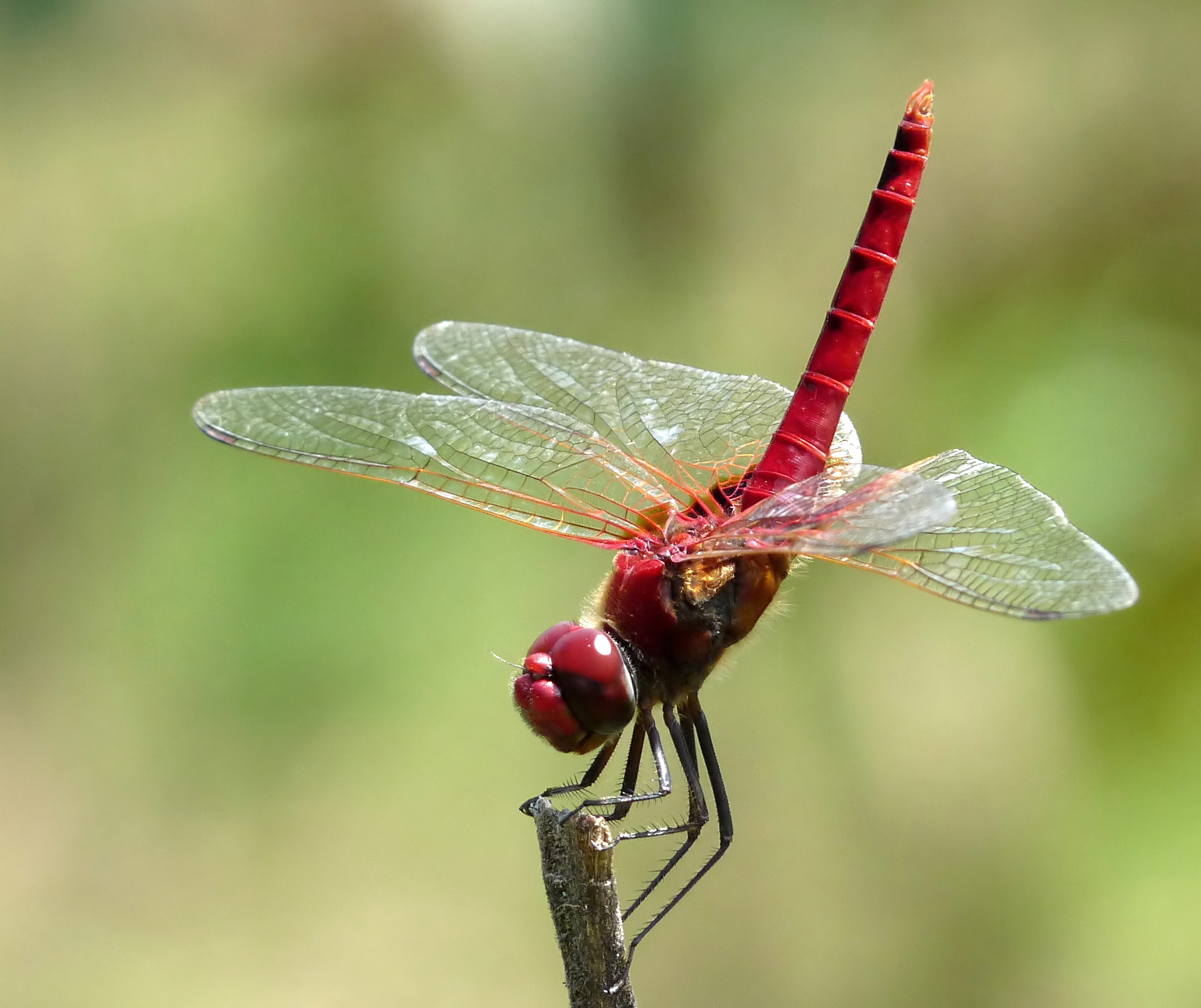
- Urothemis signata male

Scientific classification
- Kingdom: Animalia
- Phylum: Arthropoda
- Clade: Pancrustacea
- Class: Insecta
- Order: Odonata
- Infraorder: Anisoptera
- Superfamily: Libelluloidea
- Family: Libellulidae
- Genus: Urothemis; Brauer, 1868

Type species
- Urothemis bisignata

= Urothemis =

Genus of dragonflies

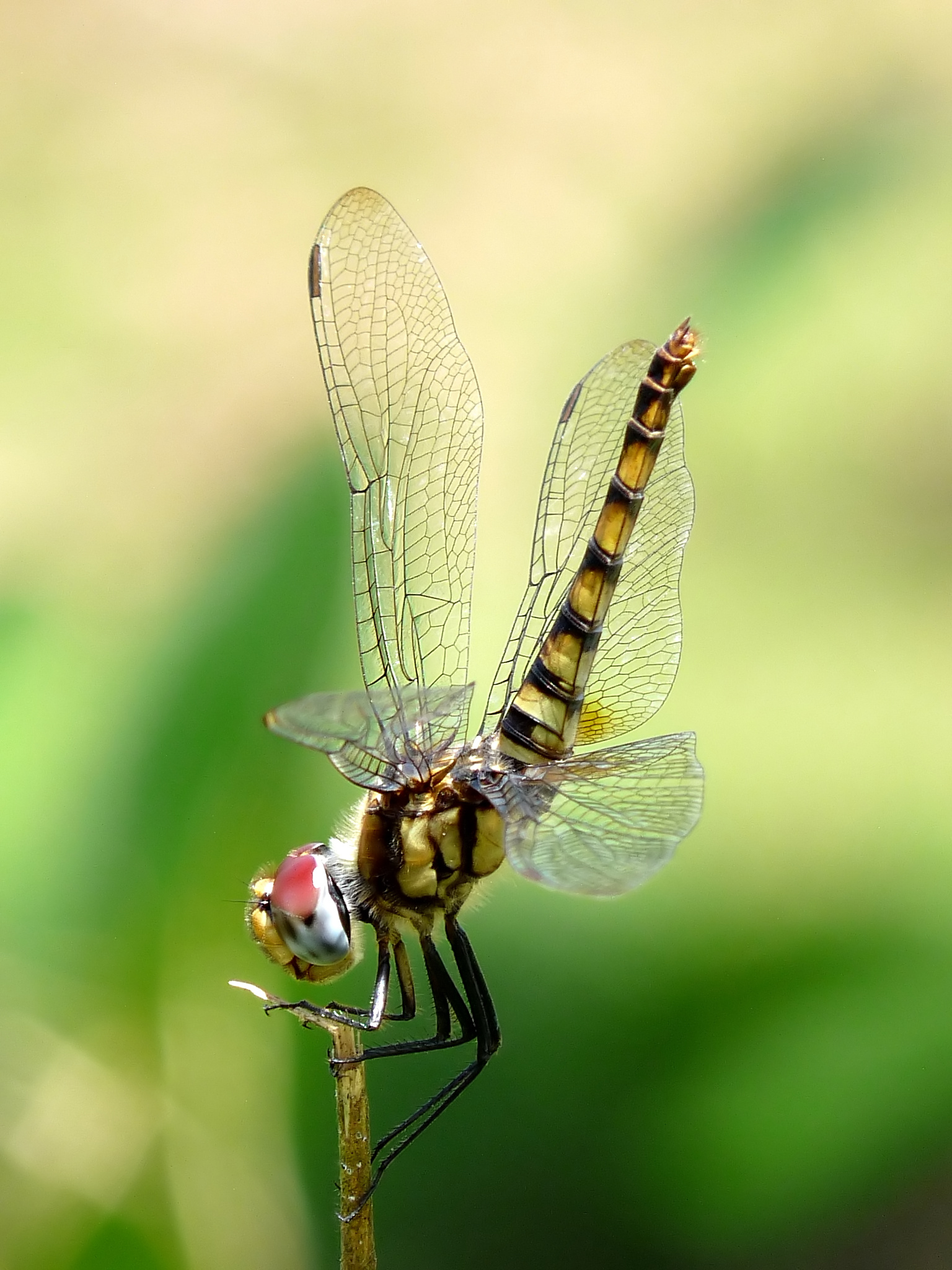
Urothemis signata, female

Urothemis is a genus of dragonfly in the family Libellulidae. Species of Urothemis can be medium-sized dragonflies which occur from Africa, across Asia to Indonesia and Australia.

== Etymology ==
The genus name Urothemis is derived from the Greek οὐρά (oura, "tail") and the common dragonfly suffix -themis. The name refers to the long vulvar scale below the female abdomen.

== Species ==
The genus Urothemis includes the following species:

Male	Female	Scientific name	Common name	Distribution
		Urothemis abbotti Laidlaw, 1927		Malaysia
		Urothemis aliena Selys, 1878	Red Baron	northern and eastern Australia and New Guinea.
		Urothemis assignata (Selys, 1872)	Red Basker	Angola, Benin, Botswana, Cameroon, the Democratic Republic of the Congo, Ivory Coast, Equatorial Guinea, Ethiopia, Gambia, Ghana, Guinea, Kenya, Liberia, Madagascar, Malawi, Mozambique, Namibia, Niger, Nigeria, Senegal, Somalia, South Africa, Tanzania, Togo, Uganda, Zambia, Zimbabwe
		Urothemis bisignata Brauer, 1868		Indonesia
		Urothemis edwardsii (Selys, 1849)	Blue Basker	Algeria; Angola; Benin; Botswana; Burkina Faso; Côte d'Ivoire; Cameroon; Chad; Congo-Brazzaville; Democratic Republic of the Congo; Ethiopia; Gabon; Gambia; Ghana; Guinee-Bissau; Kenya; Liberia; Malawi; Mali; Mauritania; Mozambique; Namibia; Niger; Nigeria; Republic of South Africa; Rwanda; Senegal; Sierra Leone; Somalia; South Sudan; Sudan; Tanzania; Uganda; Zambia; Zimbabwe
		Urothemis luciana Balinsky, 1961	St Lucia Basker	Mozambique; Republic of South Africa
		Urothemis signata (Rambur, 1842)	greater crimson glider	India, Sri Lanka, Myanmar, China and Indochina, Australia and New Guinea
		Urothemis thomasi Longfield, 1932		Oman, United Arab Emirates.
