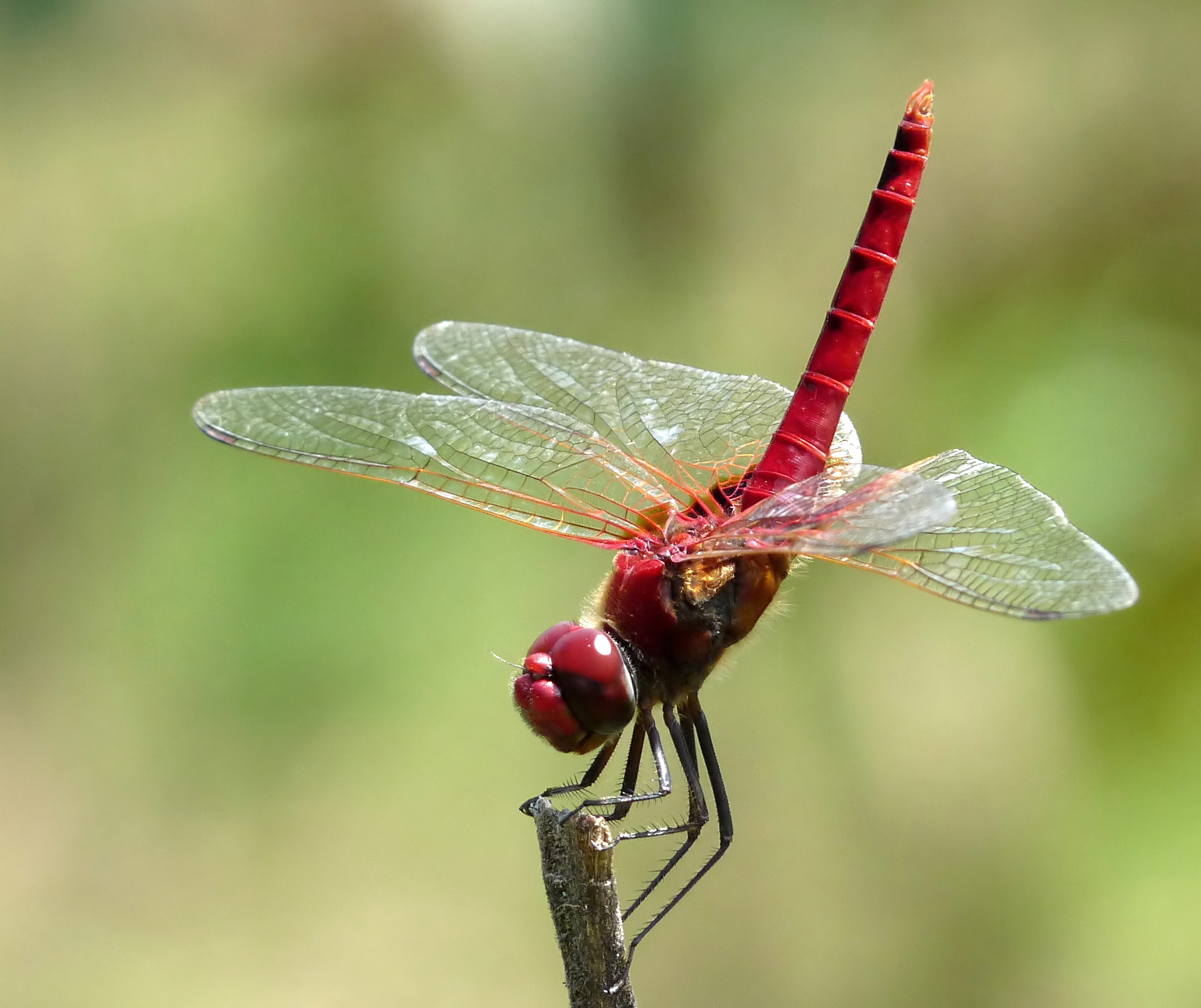
- Male U. s. signata
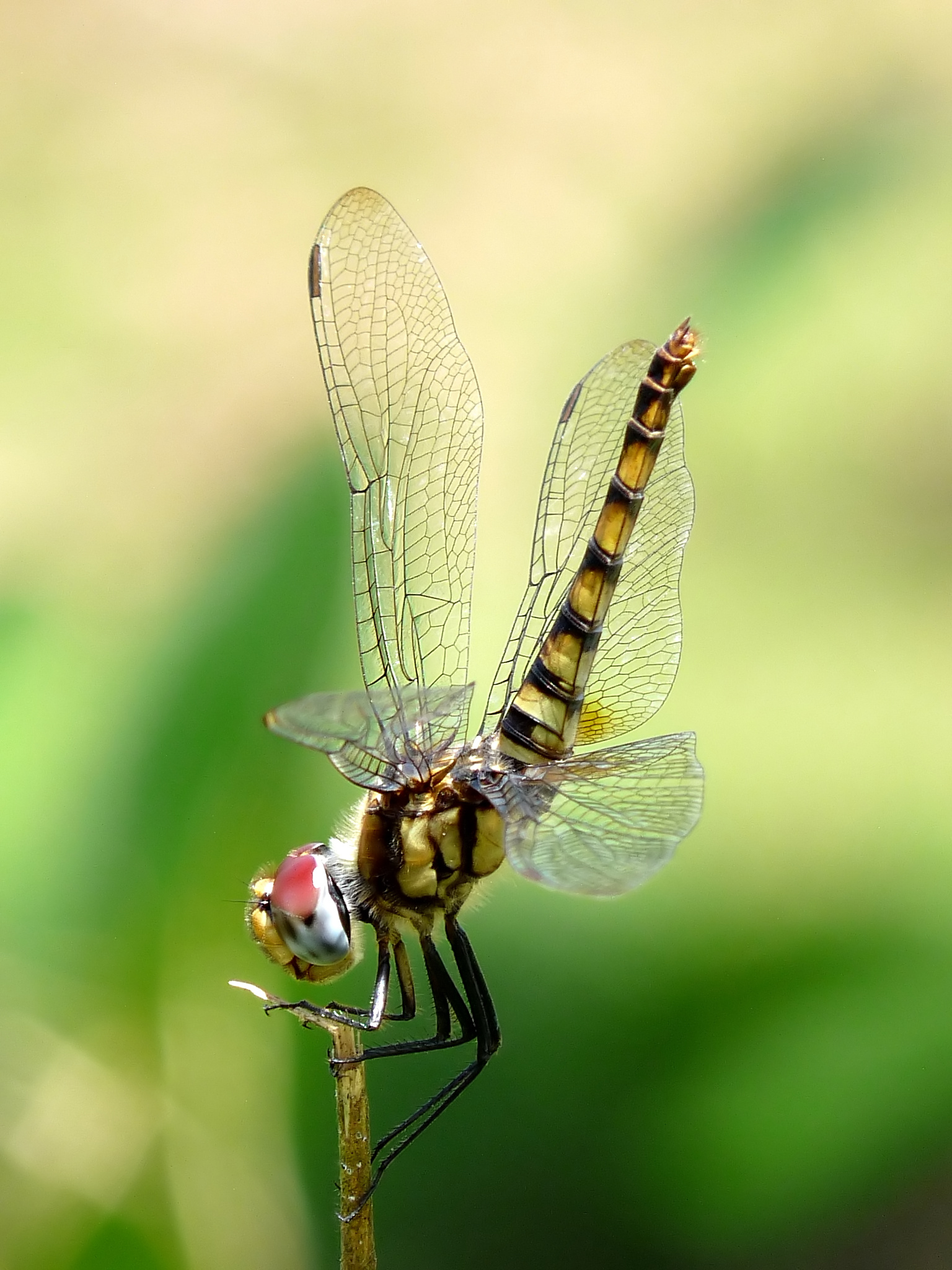
- Female U. s. signata

Conservation status
- Least Concern (IUCN 3.1)

Scientific classification
- Kingdom: Animalia
- Phylum: Arthropoda
- Clade: Pancrustacea
- Class: Insecta
- Order: Odonata
- Infraorder: Anisoptera
- Family: Libellulidae
- Genus: Urothemis
- Species: U. signata

Binomial name
- Urothemis signata (Rambur, 1842)

Synonyms
- Libellula signata Rambur, 1842

= Urothemis signata =

Species of dragonfly

Urothemis signata, the greater crimson glider, is a species of dragonfly in the family Libellulidae. It is widespread in many Asian countries. A number of subspecies are recognized for this species.

== Subspecies ==
There are four subspecies are recognized.

- Urothemis signata aliena Selys, 1878 - Australia and New Guinea
- Urothemis signata insignata (Selys, 1872) - Sundaland
- Urothemis signata signata (Rambur 1842) - India, Sri Lanka, Myanmar, China and Indochina
- Urothemis signata yiei Asahina, 1972 - Taiwan

== Description and habitat ==
It is a medium-sized dragonfly with red eyes. thorax and abdomen. Its wings are transparent with an amber colored spot surrounded by a dark-brown patch in the base of hind-wings. Its abdomen is blood-red, with some black marking on the dorsum of segments 8 and 9. Female is similar to the male; but yellowish in color. The black spots on the dorsum is repeated on segments 3 to 7. Juvenile and sub-adult males also have these marks.

This species breeds in ponds and slow flowing rivers, typically in lowland areas. The males often found perch on exposed twigs. This species has managed to colonise urban water bodies and park ponds.

== Image gallery ==
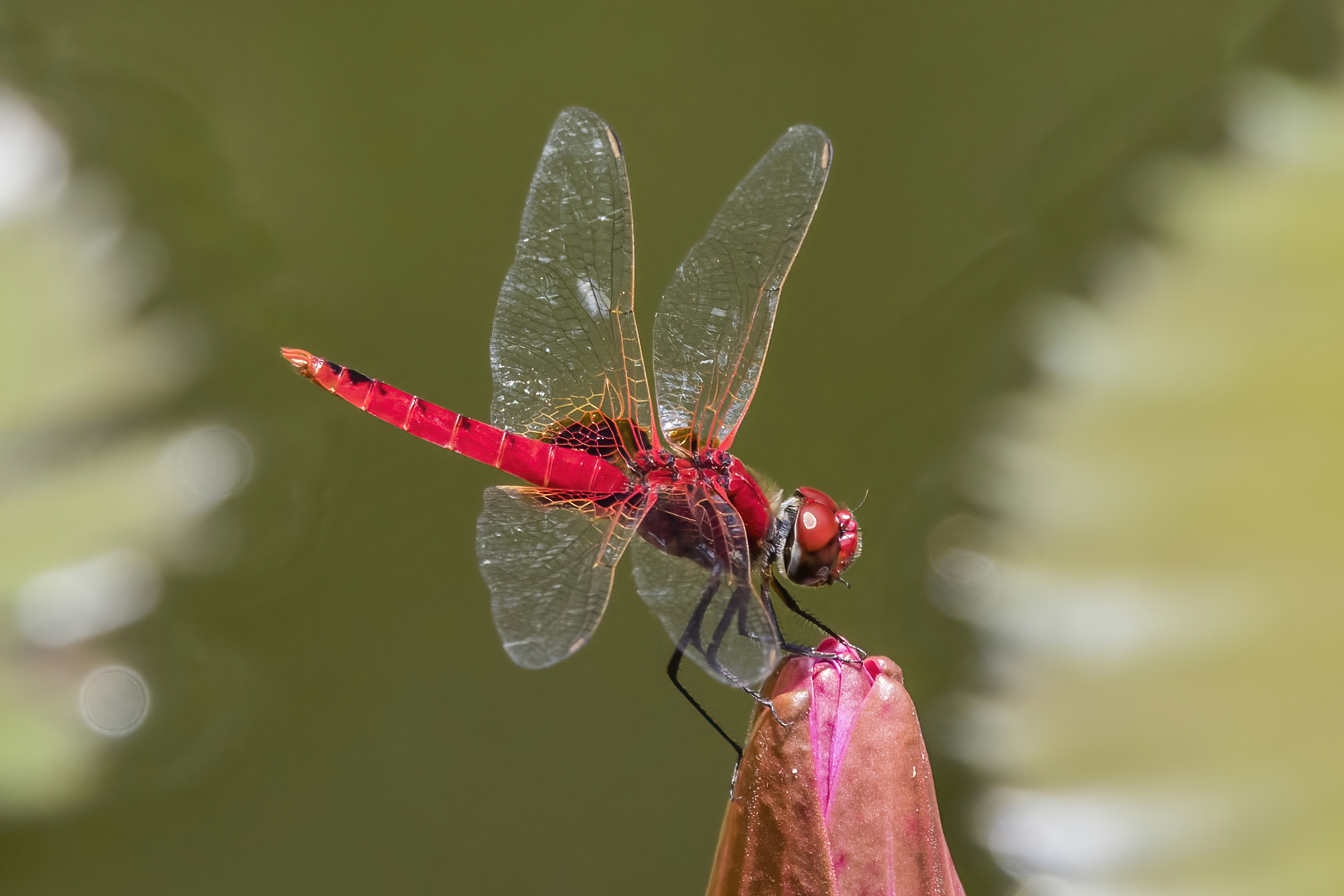
from Sri Lanka

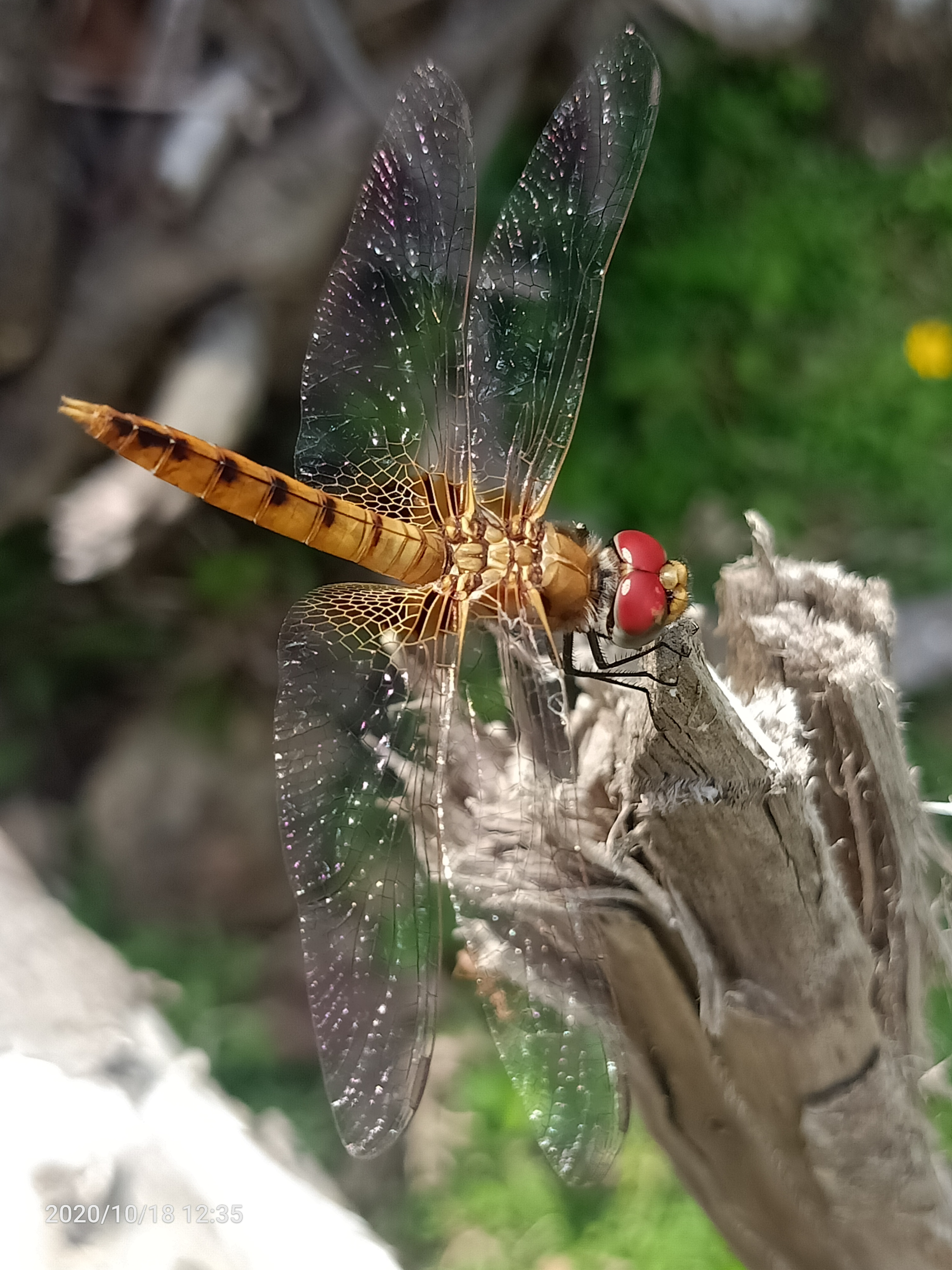
Vechoochira, Kerala, India.

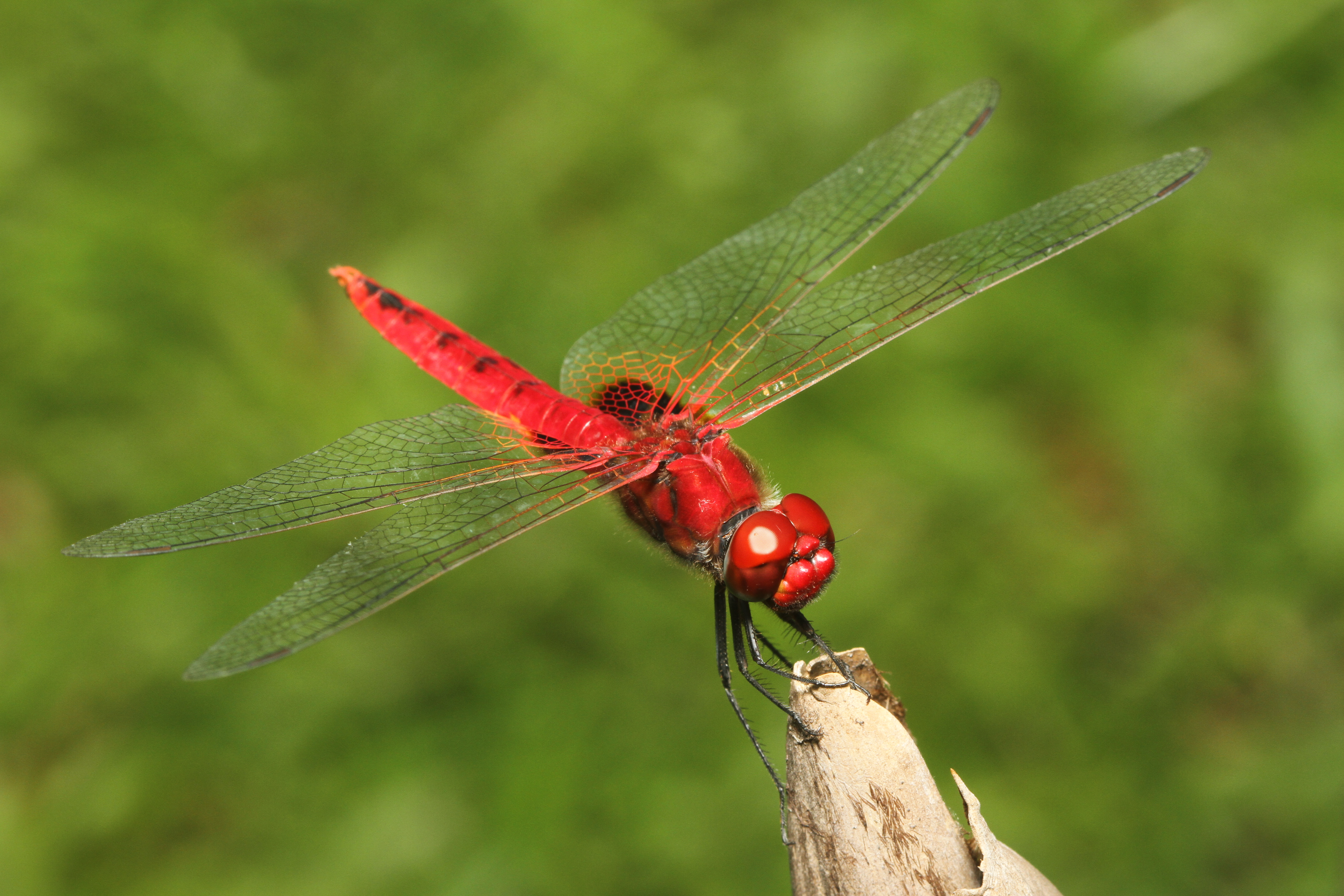
from India

=== See also ===
- List of odonates of Sri Lanka
- List of odonates of India
- List of odonata of Kerala
