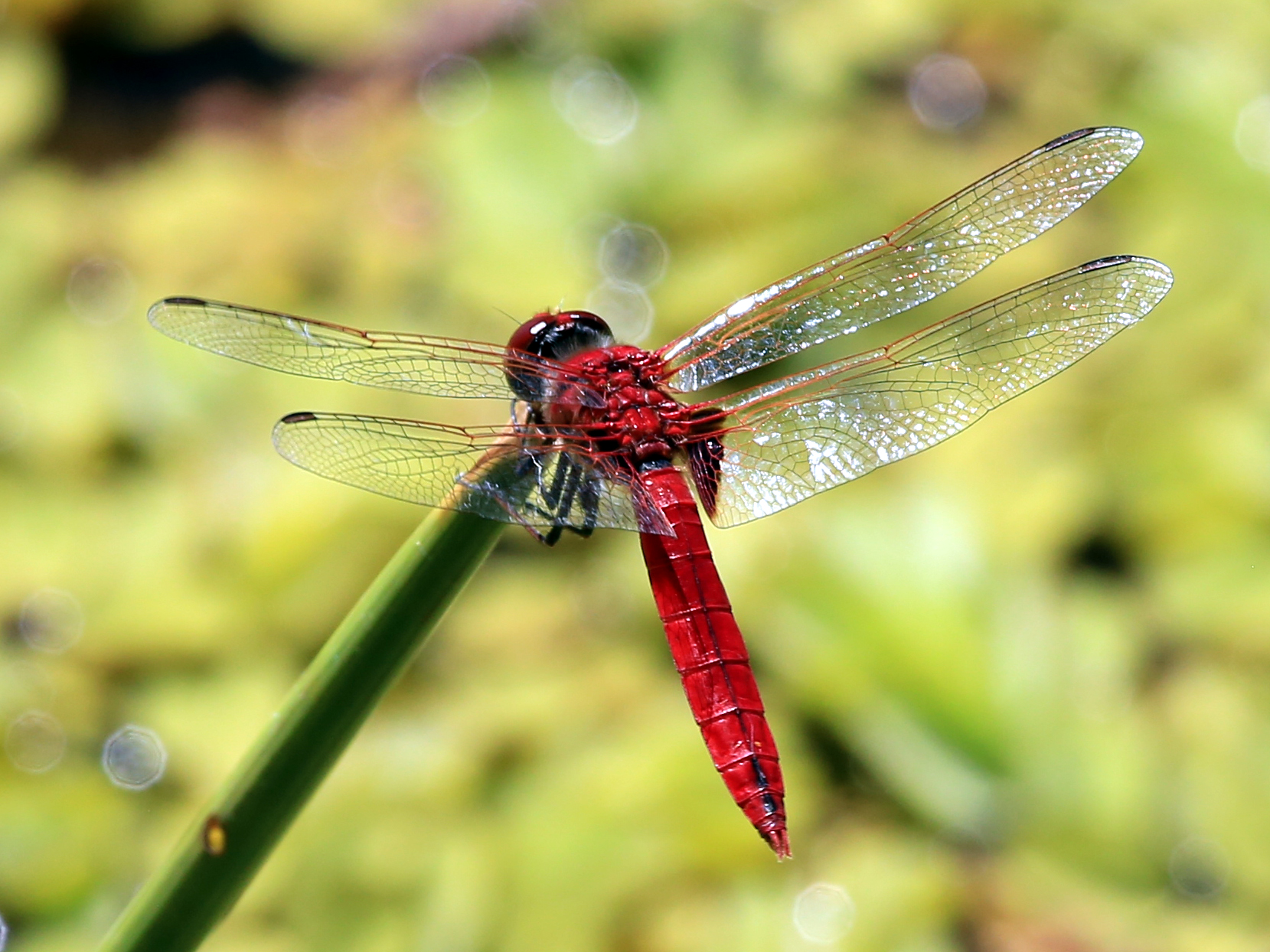
- Male, Cairns, Australia

Conservation status
- Least Concern (IUCN 3.1)

Scientific classification
- Kingdom: Animalia
- Phylum: Arthropoda
- Clade: Pancrustacea
- Class: Insecta
- Order: Odonata
- Infraorder: Anisoptera
- Family: Libellulidae
- Genus: Urothemis
- Species: U. aliena

Binomial name
- Urothemis aliena Selys, 1878

= Urothemis aliena =

Red baron

Species of dragonfly

Urothemis aliena, commonly called the red baron, is a species of dragonfly native to northern and eastern Australia and New Guinea. It belongs to the family Libellulidae. This species is typically found in riverine lagoons and ponds.

Urothemis aliena is a medium-sized dragonfly (wingspan 85mm, length 45mm). It is characterized by its vibrant red body and features two dark spots on segments eight and nine of its abdomen. The hindwing displays a dark triangular-shaped reddish-brown mark at the base. This species is found across Australia, ranging from Broome, Western Australia along the northern region of the continent to the southern border of Queensland.

== Etymology ==
The genus name Urothemis is derived from the Greek οὐρά (oura, "tail") and the common dragonfly suffix -themis. The name refers to the long vulvar scale below the female abdomen.

The species name aliena is derived from the Latin alienus ("belonging to another" or "foreign"), referring to the large dark spot on each hindwing that distinguishes it from other members of the genus.

== Gallery ==
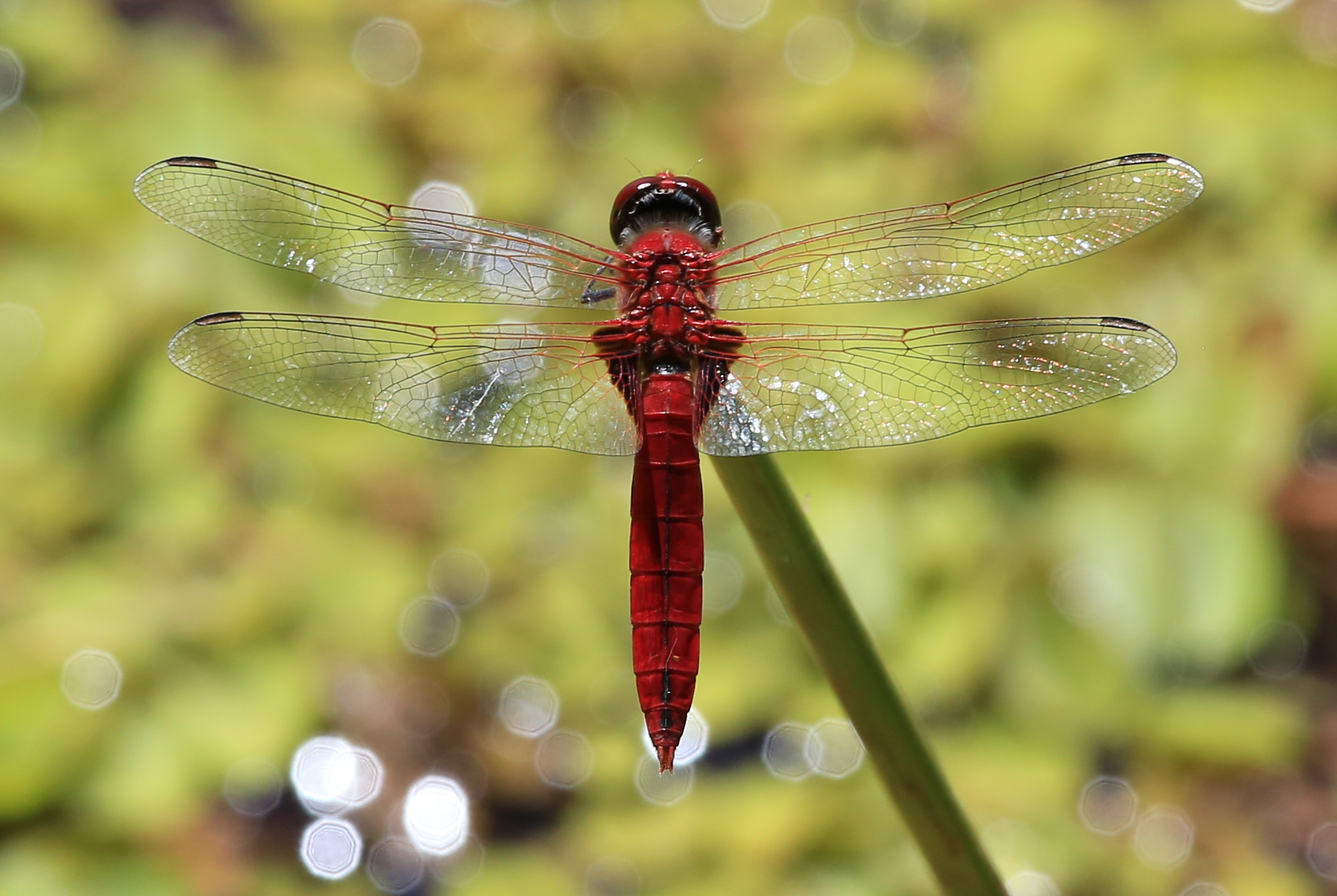
Male

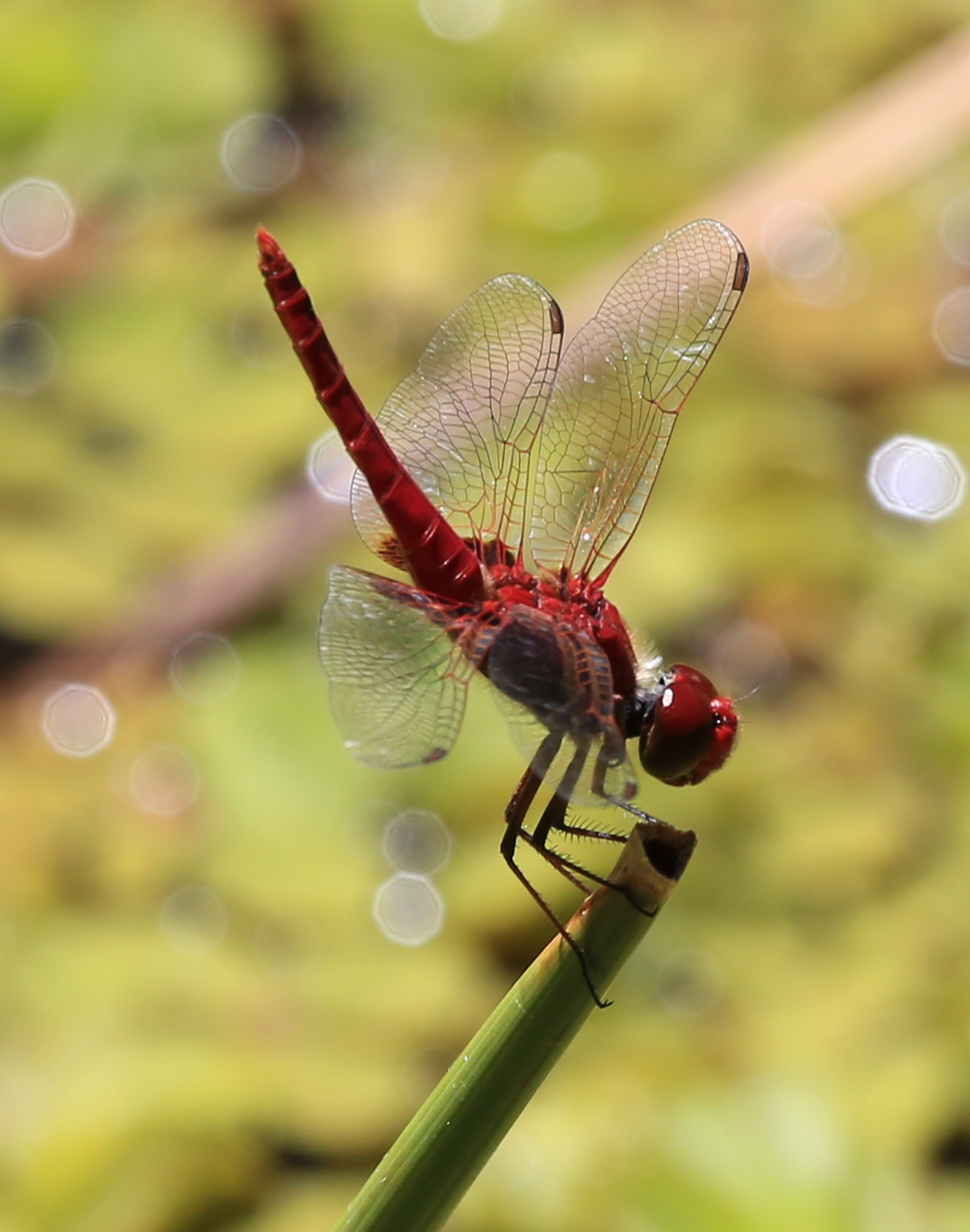
Male in obelisk position

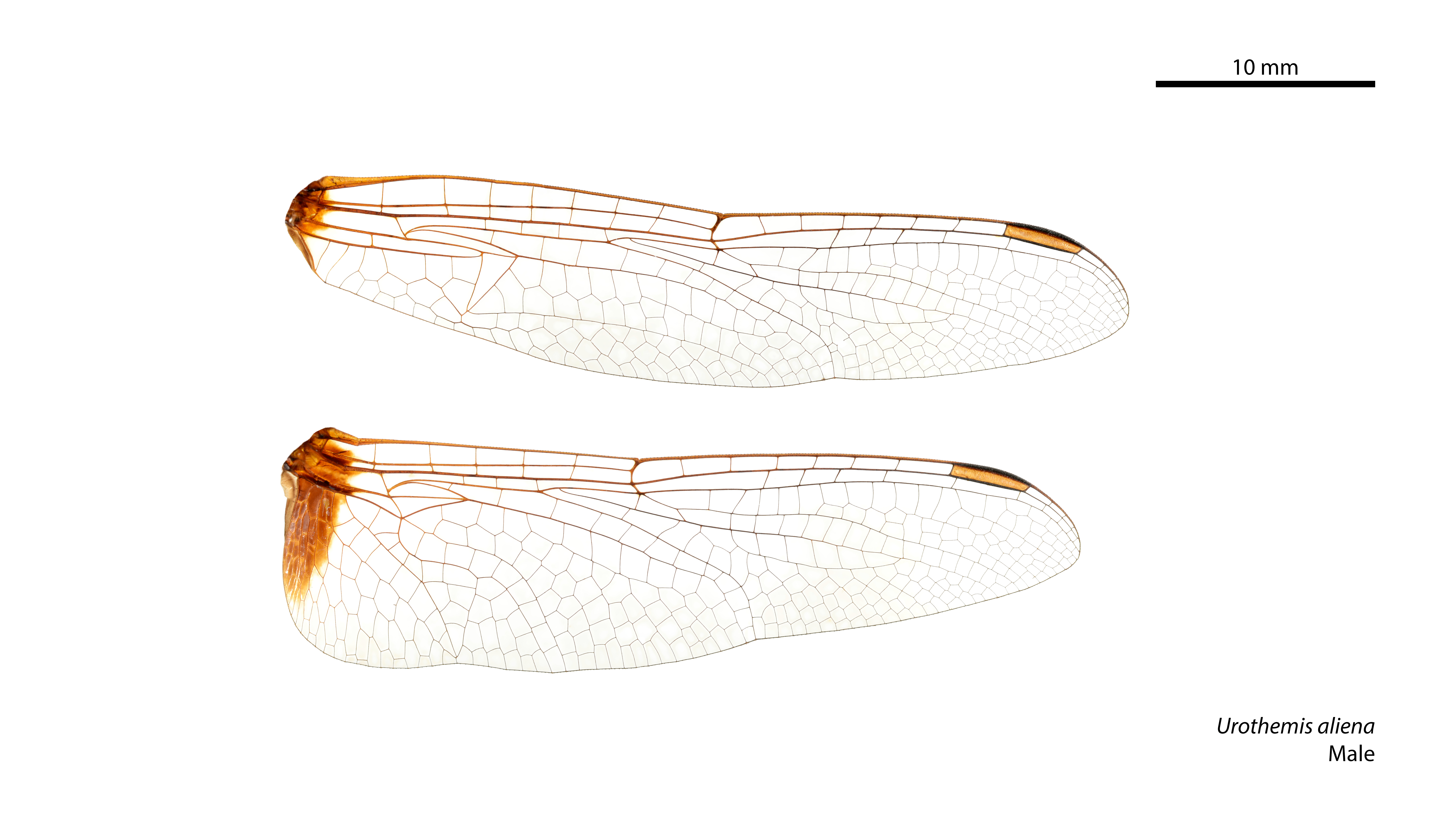
Male wings

== See also ==
- Urothemis
- List of Odonata species of Australia
