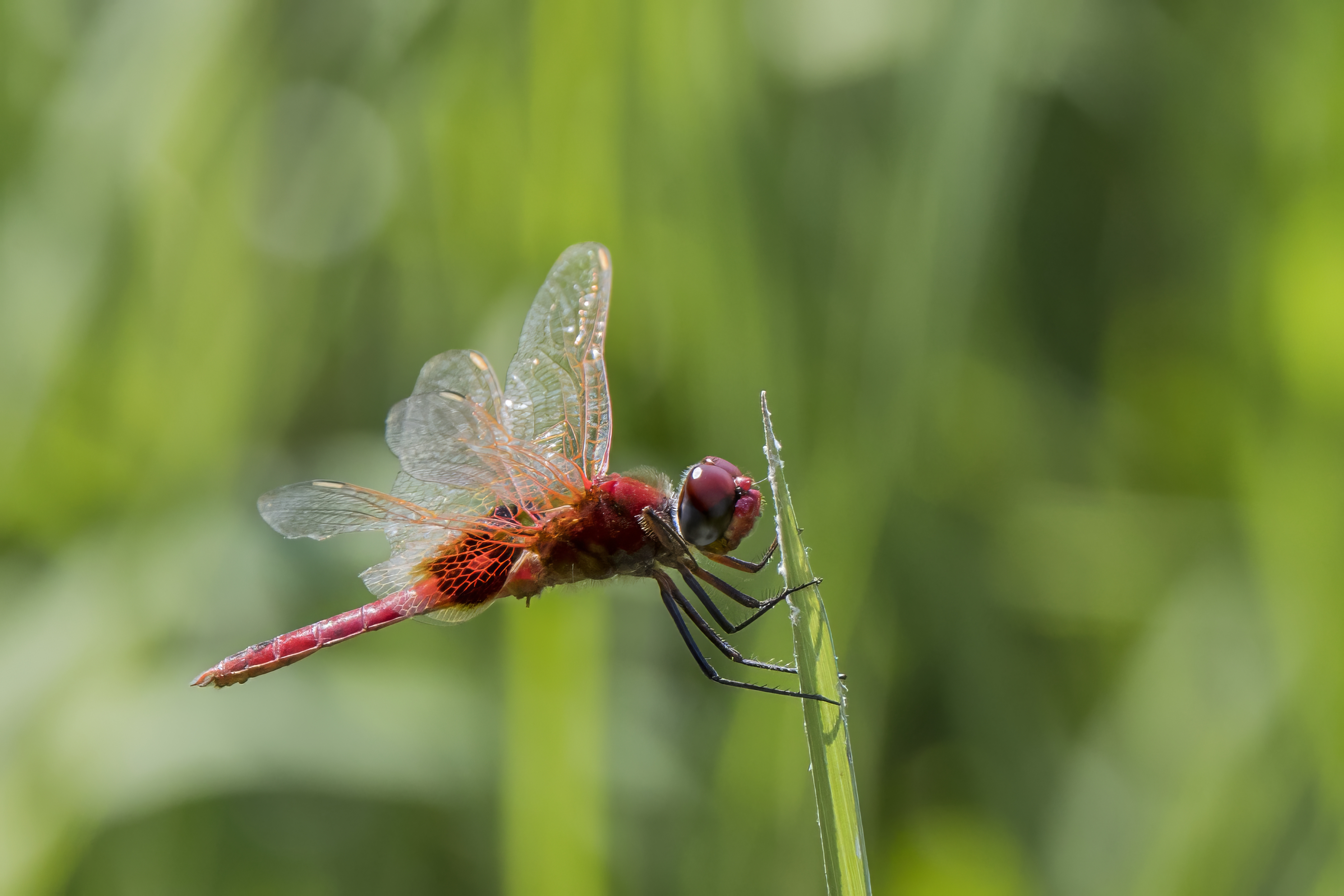
- Male, Kruger National Park

Conservation status
- Least Concern (IUCN 3.1)

Scientific classification
- Kingdom: Animalia
- Phylum: Arthropoda
- Class: Insecta
- Order: Odonata
- Infraorder: Anisoptera
- Family: Libellulidae
- Genus: Urothemis
- Species: U. assignata

Binomial name
- Urothemis assignata (Selys, 1872)

= Urothemis assignata =

Species of dragonfly

Urothemis assignata, the red basker, is a species of dragonfly in the family Libellulidae.

== Distribution ==
It is found in Angola, Benin, Botswana, Cameroon, the Democratic Republic of the Congo, Ivory Coast, Equatorial Guinea, Ethiopia, Gambia, Ghana, Guinea, Kenya, Liberia, Madagascar, Malawi, Mozambique, Namibia, Niger, Nigeria, Senegal, Somalia, South Africa, Tanzania, Togo, Uganda, Zambia, Zimbabwe, and possibly Burundi.

== Habitat ==
Its natural habitats are rivers, shrub-dominated wetlands, freshwater lakes, intermittent freshwater lakes, freshwater marshes, and intermittent freshwater marshes.

== Gallery ==
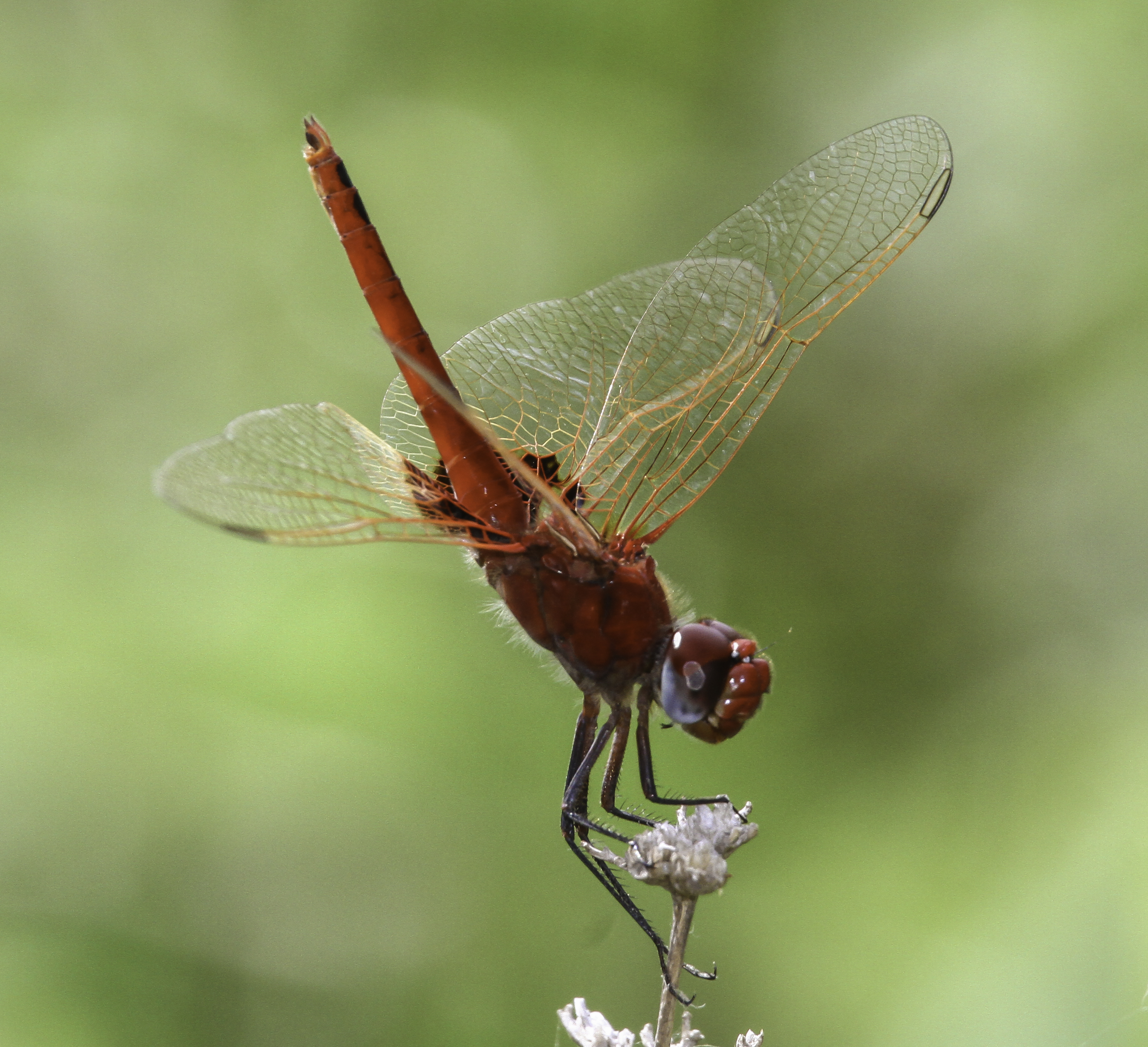
Red basker male. Tshipese South Africa

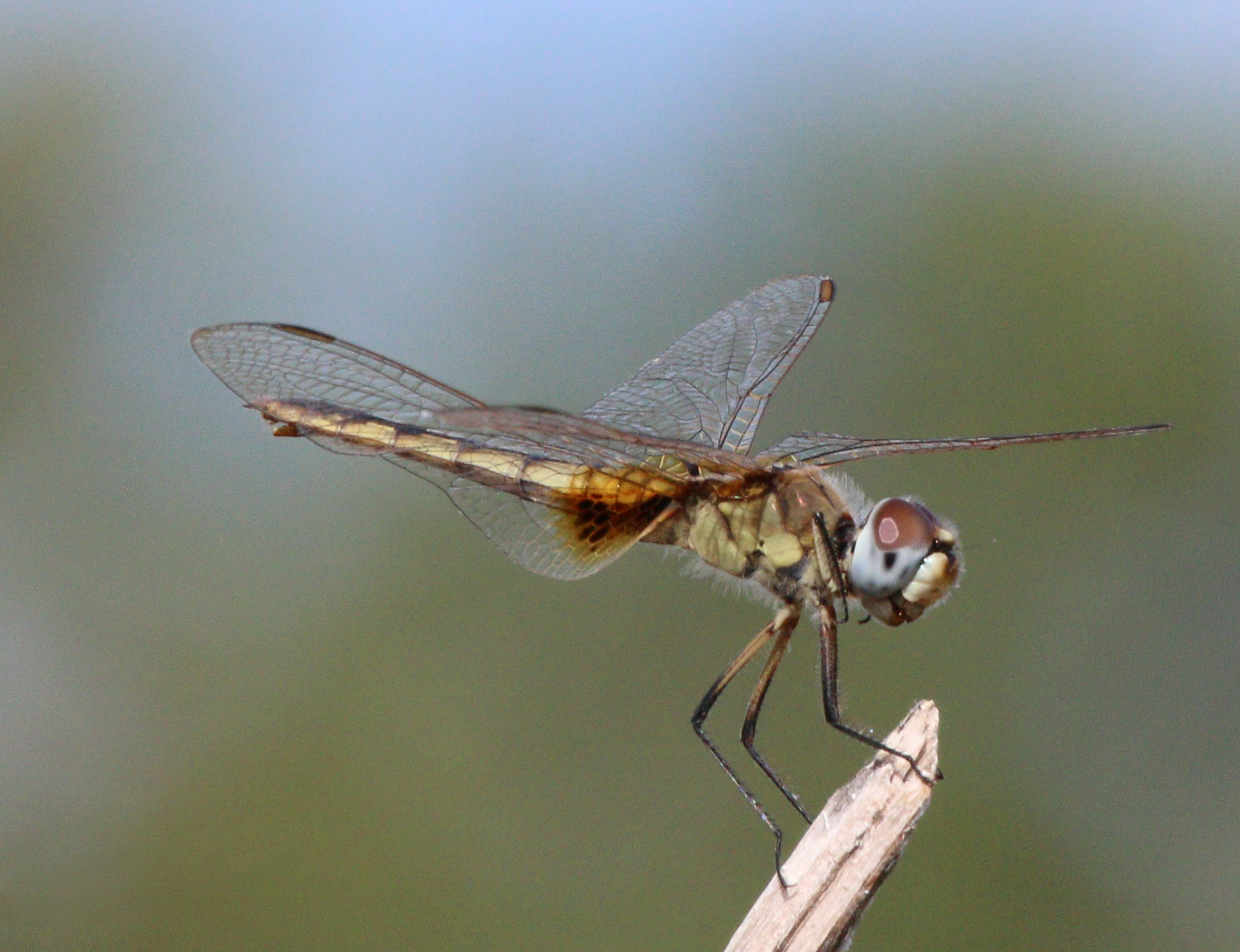
Red basker female. Kasane, Botswana
