= Urothemis luciana =

Conservation status
- Near Threatened (IUCN 3.1)

Scientific classification
- Kingdom: Animalia
- Phylum: Arthropoda
- Class: Insecta
- Order: Odonata
- Infraorder: Anisoptera
- Family: Libellulidae
- Genus: Urothemis
- Species: U. luciana

Binomial name
- Urothemis luciana Balinsky, 1961

Species of dragonfly

Urothemis luciana is a species of dragonfly in the family Libellulidae. It is endemic to South Africa.
