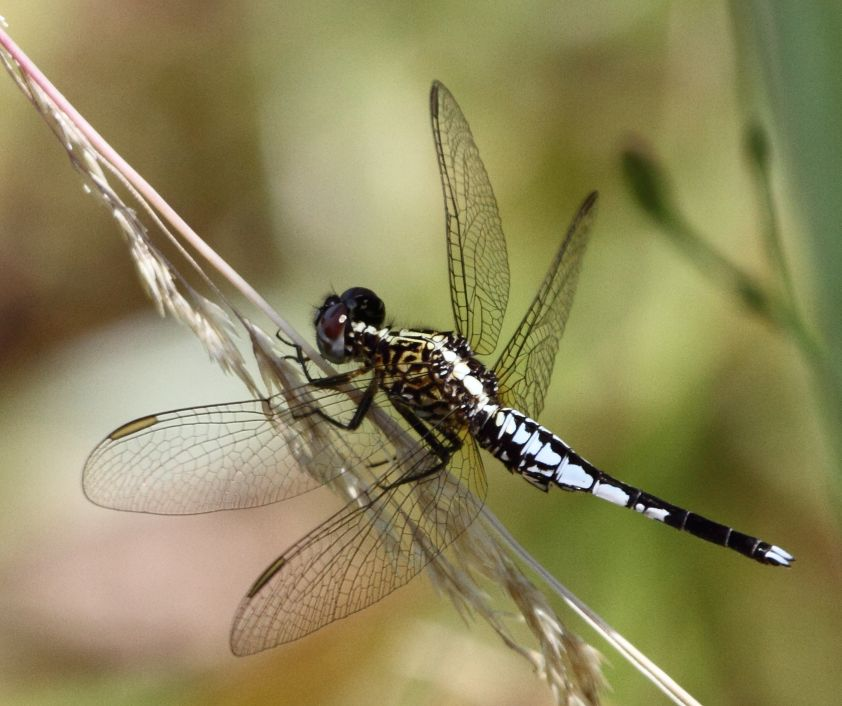
- Male
- Female

Conservation status
- Least Concern (IUCN 3.1)

Scientific classification
- Kingdom: Animalia
- Phylum: Arthropoda
- Clade: Pancrustacea
- Class: Insecta
- Order: Odonata
- Suborder: Anisoptera
- Superfamily: Libelluloidea
- Family: Libellulidae
- Genus: Acisoma
- Species: A. inflatum

Binomial name
- Acisoma inflatum Selys, 1882

= Acisoma inflatum =

Species of dragonfly

Acisoma inflatum, the stout pintail is a species of dragonfly in the family Libellulidae. It's genus, previously thought to have two species, has been found out to have six unique species.

== Appearance ==
The stout pintail and the slender pintail look very similar to each other upon a first look, and they often can be found in the same areas. The males have bright turquoise eyes and a base color of a pale blue that is heavily mottled with black patterns. Females still have some pale blue on them and also the black mottled patterns, but their abdomens and first couple segments of the thorax also have a yellowish-brown wash over them, making them duller than the males. Both males and females have a wide base of the thorax that quickly tapers off. They also both have long pterostigmata, but in males they are paler and more blue than in females, which have that same yellowish-brown wash over them.

== Distribution ==
Throughout much of Africa; relict populations exist north of the Sahara in Algeria, Egypt and Libya.

== Habitat ==
It is found near and in calm water bodies with grass, such as grassy ponds and pans.

== Identification ==
Distribution overlaps with the similar Acisoma variegatum (slender pintail) in southern and eastern Africa. The two species can be differentiated based on abdominal markings and abdomen shape. More specifically, the 6th segment of the thorax is shorter in the stout pintail.

== Conservation status ==
They are listed as least concern, seemingly common in native habitats in South Africa.
