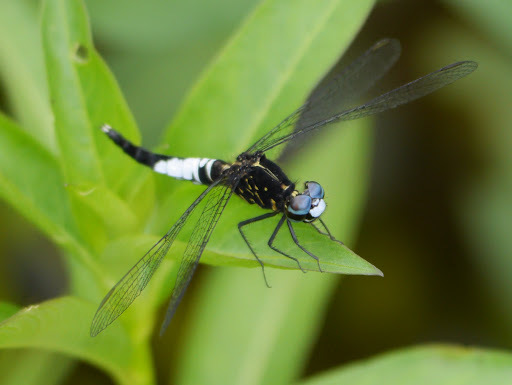
- Male
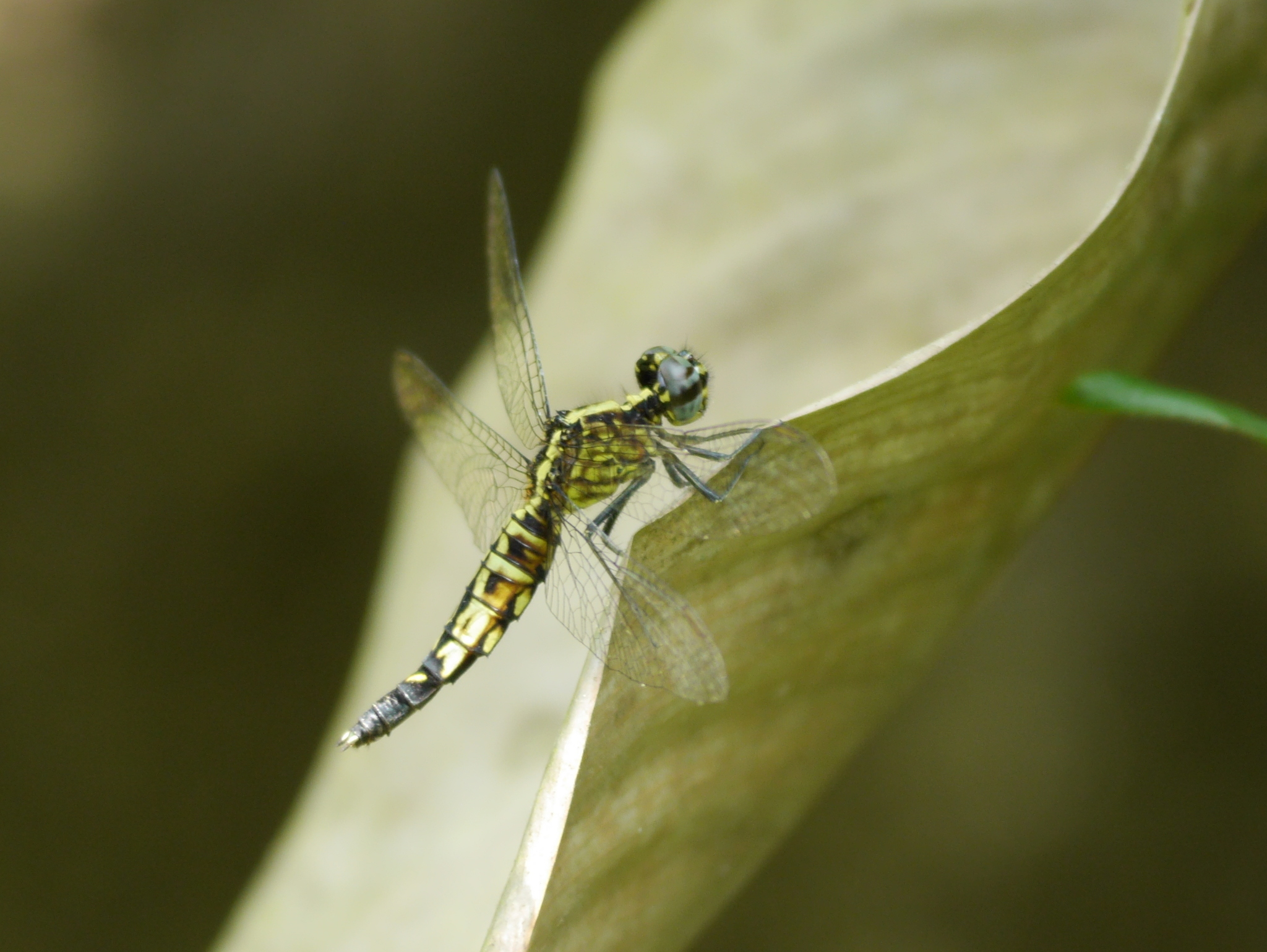
- Female

Conservation status
- Least Concern (IUCN 3.1)

Scientific classification
- Kingdom: Animalia
- Phylum: Arthropoda
- Clade: Pancrustacea
- Class: Insecta
- Order: Odonata
- Infraorder: Anisoptera
- Superfamily: Libelluloidea
- Family: Libellulidae
- Genus: Acisoma
- Species: A. trifidum

Binomial name
- Acisoma trifidum Kirby, 1889

Synonyms
- Acisoma trifida Kirby, 1889; Acisoma lacroixi Martin, 1905

= Acisoma trifidum =

Species of dragonfly

Acisoma trifidum is a species of dragonfly in the family Libellulidae known commonly as the ivory pintail. It is native to Africa, where it is widespread. It lives near swamps. Though much of its habitat is declining, it is common and not considered to be a threatened species.

== Appearance ==
The Ivory Pintail has bluish-black eyes with white jaws. The rest of their bodies are almost entirely black, with its abdomen having a fairly large patch of ivory near the upper-middle. Their terminal abdominal appendages are small, and also the same ivory color as their abdominal marking. The abdominal marking is presumably where they get their colloquial name ivory pintail from. The pterostigma is long and pretty solid black in color.
