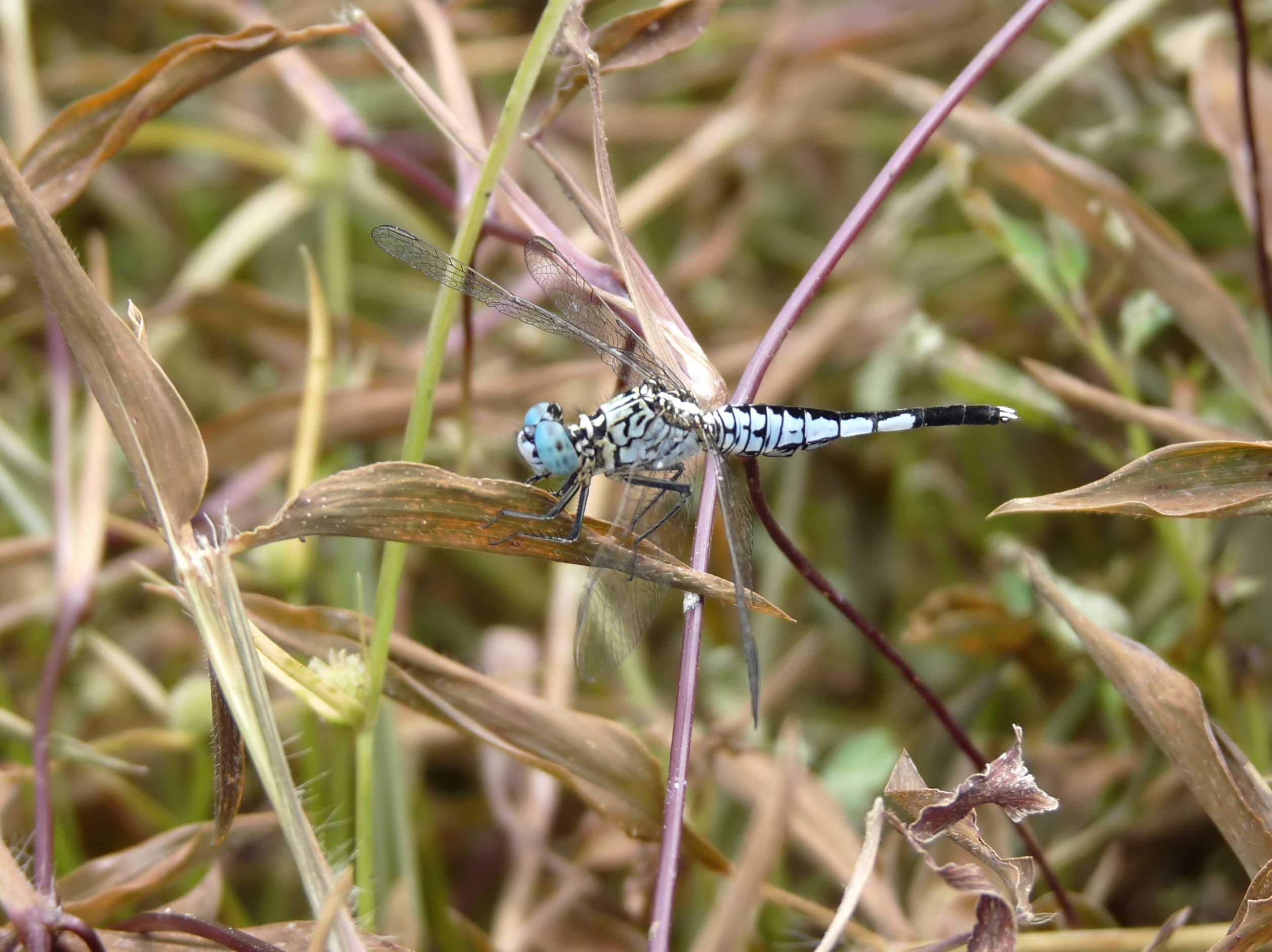
- Grizzled pintail

Scientific classification
- Kingdom: Animalia
- Phylum: Arthropoda
- Clade: Pancrustacea
- Class: Insecta
- Order: Odonata
- Infraorder: Anisoptera
- Superfamily: Libelluloidea
- Family: Libellulidae
- Subfamily: Sympetrinae
- Genus: Acisoma; Rambur, 1842

= Acisoma =

Pintails

Genus of dragonflies

Acisoma is a small genus of dragonflies in the family Libellulidae.

== Description ==
The colouration of Acisoma is typically brown to black and often includes contrasting bright white, green, and blue markings. They are small relative to many other dragonfly species at 16-25 mm.

Like other genera that are part of the Erythemis-group, Acisoma have an enlarged occipital triangle (the plate on the back of their head) causing their eyes to meet for less than the triangles length.

== Species ==
This genus contains six species:

| Male | Female | Scientific name | Common name | Distribution |
|---|---|---|---|---|
| | | Acisoma ascalaphoides Rambur, 1842 | littoral pintail | Madagascar |
| | | Acisoma attenboroughi Mens, Schütte, Stokvis & Dijkstra, 2016 | Attenborough's pintail | Madagascar |
| | | Acisoma inflatum Selys, 1882 | stout pintail | Sahara in Algeria, Egypt and Libya. |
| | | Acisoma panorpoides Rambur, 1842 | Asian pintail, grizzled pintail | Japan, the Philippines and Indonesia. |
| | | Acisoma trifidum Kirby, 1889 | pied pintail, ivory pintail | Africa |
| | | Acisoma variegatum Kirby, 1898 | slender pintail | Eastern and south-eastern Africa; Ethiopia to Katanga and north-eastern South Africa |
