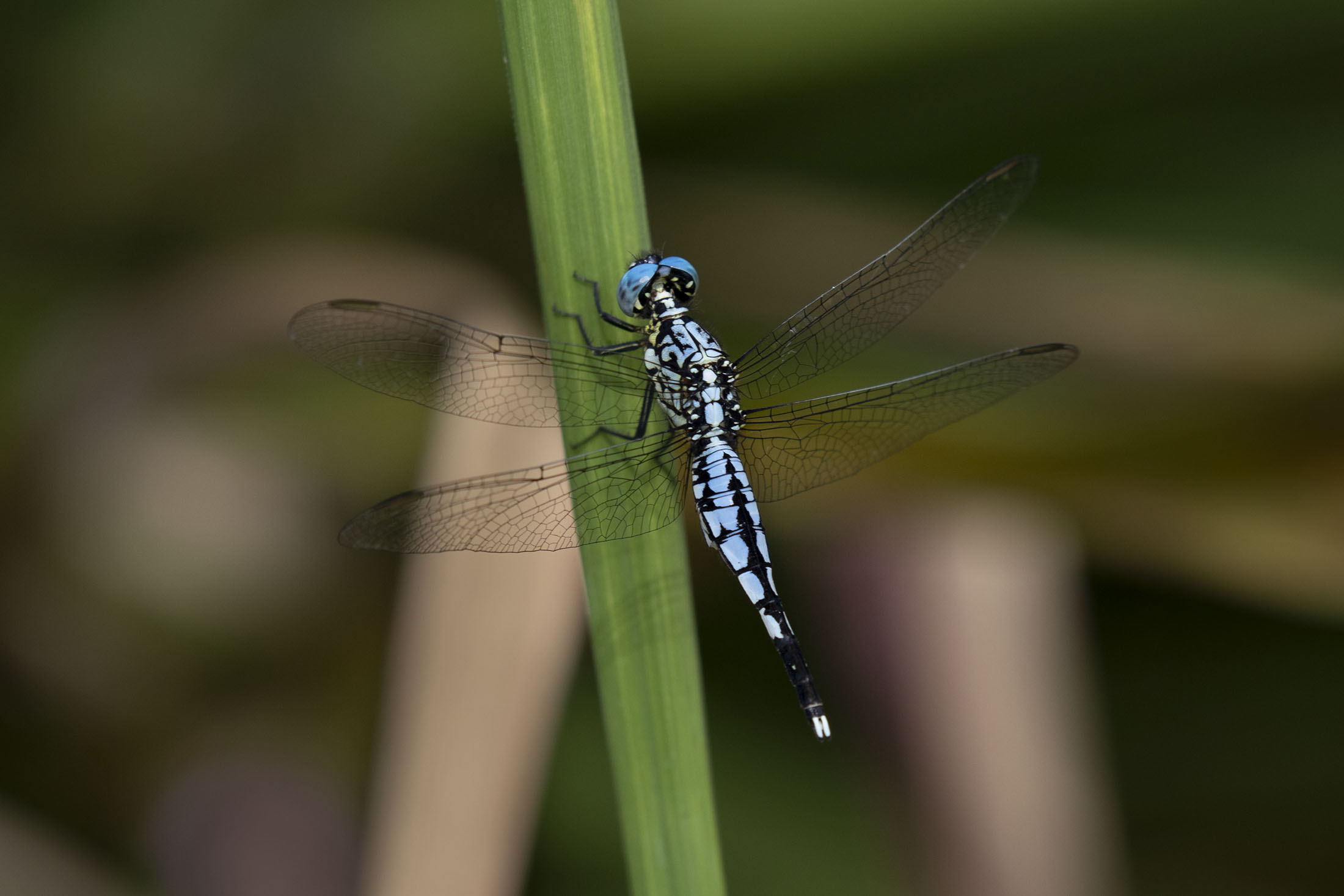
- Libellulidae- Acisoma attenboroughi (Attenborough's Pintail) male

Conservation status
- Least Concern (IUCN 3.1)

Scientific classification
- Kingdom: Animalia
- Phylum: Arthropoda
- Clade: Pancrustacea
- Class: Insecta
- Order: Odonata
- Infraorder: Anisoptera
- Superfamily: Libelluloidea
- Family: Libellulidae
- Genus: Acisoma
- Species: A. attenboroughi

Binomial name
- Acisoma attenboroughi Mens, Schutte, Stokvis & Dijkstra, 2016

= Acisoma attenboroughi =

Dragonfly from Madagascar named after David Attenborough

Acisoma attenboroughi, or Attenborough's pintail, is a species of dragonfly. It is a member of the genus Acisoma and was named after the naturalist Sir David Attenborough in honour of his 90th Birthday.

It is found only in Madagascar, but is "very common" there. It has commonly been confused with other African and Asian species for over a hundred years, but genetic testing and studies have confirmed its unique species status.

== Appearance ==
Its whole body is a strikingly beautiful pattern of black and vibrant blue. They have blue eyes. Their thoraxes look as though they are black and have symmetrical blue patterns, while their abdomens almost seem to do the inverse and appear as though they are blue with black patterns. The terminal abdominal appendages are blue, which is a stark contrast to the rest of the end of their abdomens which is black. The pterostigma is a slightly see through black.

== Behavior ==
Widespread across the island of Madagascar.

== Conservation Status ==
They are marked as "Least Concern" as of 2017. Although, their population trends have not been monitored.

== See also ==
- List of things named after David Attenborough and his works
