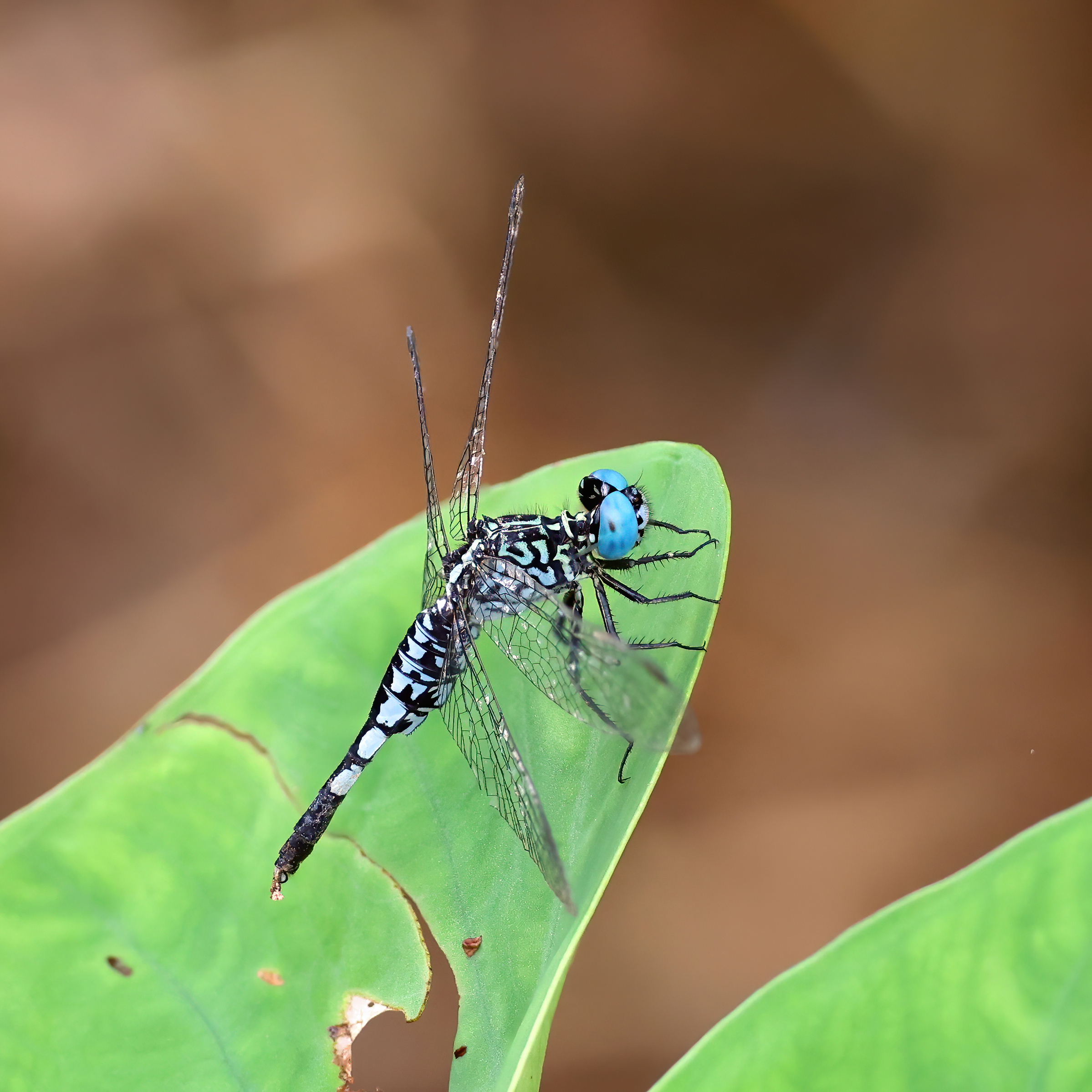
- Male
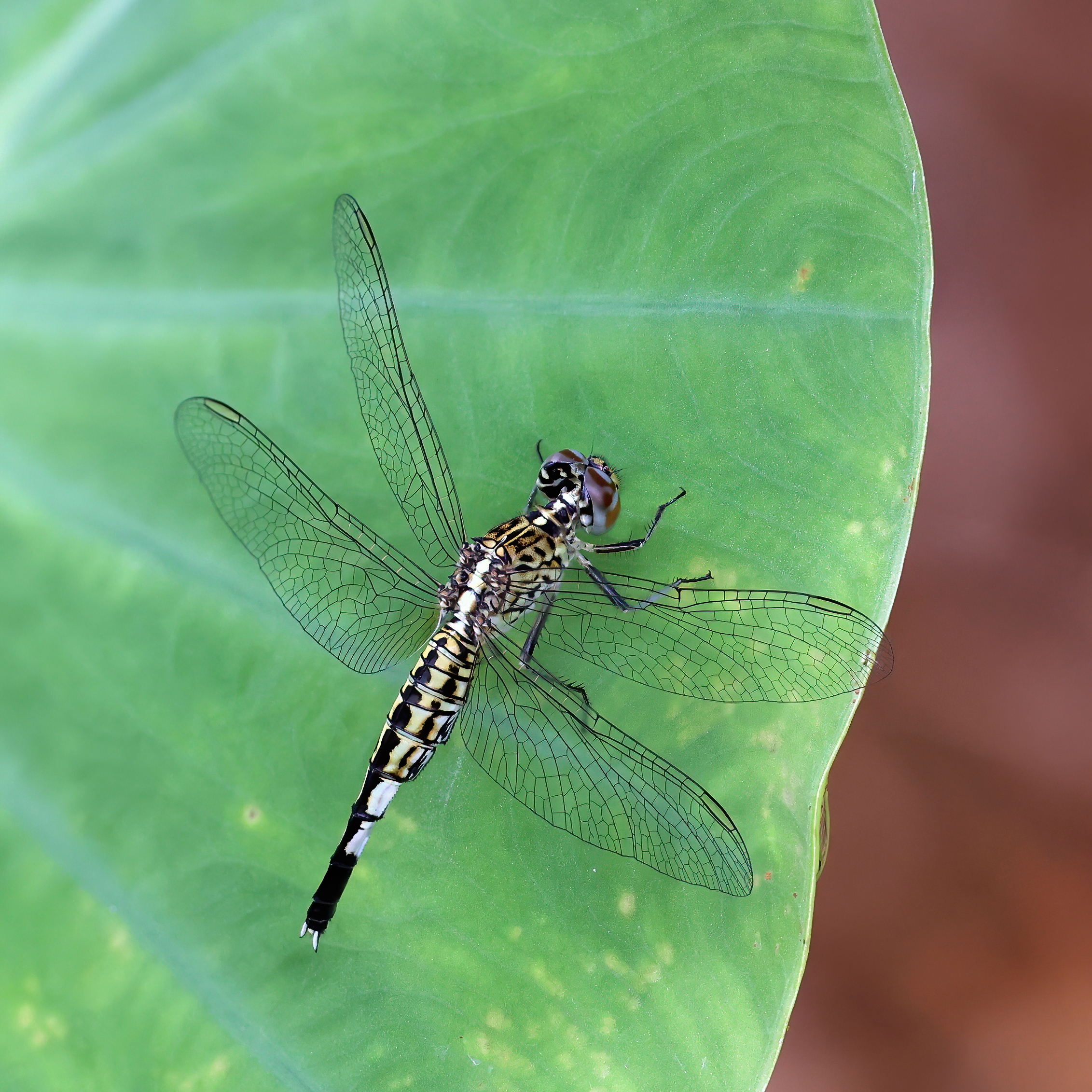
- Female both in Phuket, Thailand

Conservation status
- Least Concern (IUCN 3.1)

Scientific classification
- Kingdom: Animalia
- Phylum: Arthropoda
- Class: Insecta
- Order: Odonata
- Infraorder: Anisoptera
- Family: Libellulidae
- Genus: Acisoma
- Species: A. panorpoides

Binomial name
- Acisoma panorpoides Rambur, 1842

= Acisoma panorpoides =

Species of dragonfly

Acisoma panorpoides, the Asian pintail, trumpet tail, or grizzled pintail, is a species of dragonfly in the family Libellulidae.

== Distribution ==
It is widespread in Asia, from the Indian subcontinent to Japan, the Philippines and Indonesia.

== Description ==
It is a small dragonfly with blue eyes. Its thorax is azure-blue marbled with black to form a beautiful pattern on the dorsum and the sides. Abdomen is azure-blue, marked with black. Segments 1 to 5 have sutures finely and ventral borders more broadly black. There is a dorsal stripe which broadens at the jugal sutures and apical borders of segments. There is a speckled stripe on sub-dorsum of segments 1 to 4. There is a large ventro-lateral spot on each of segments 3 to 5. Segments 6 and 7 are black with a large spot of blue on each side. Segments 8 to 10 are entirely black. Anal appendages are bluish-white. Female is similar to the male; but with greenish-yellow eyes, thorax and abdominal segments up to 5.

The characteristic shape of the abdomen will serve to distinguish this species from other Libellulidae.

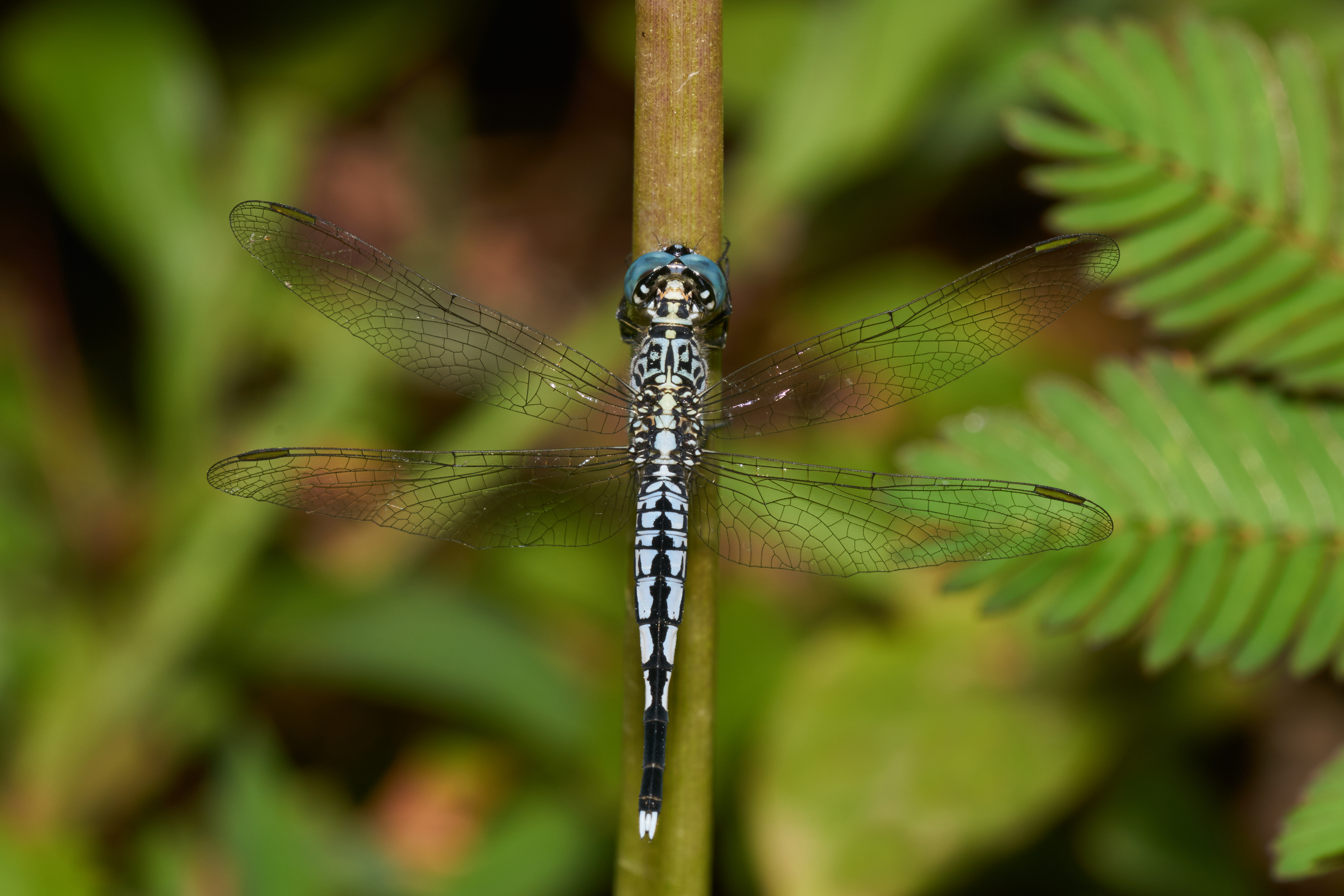
Male

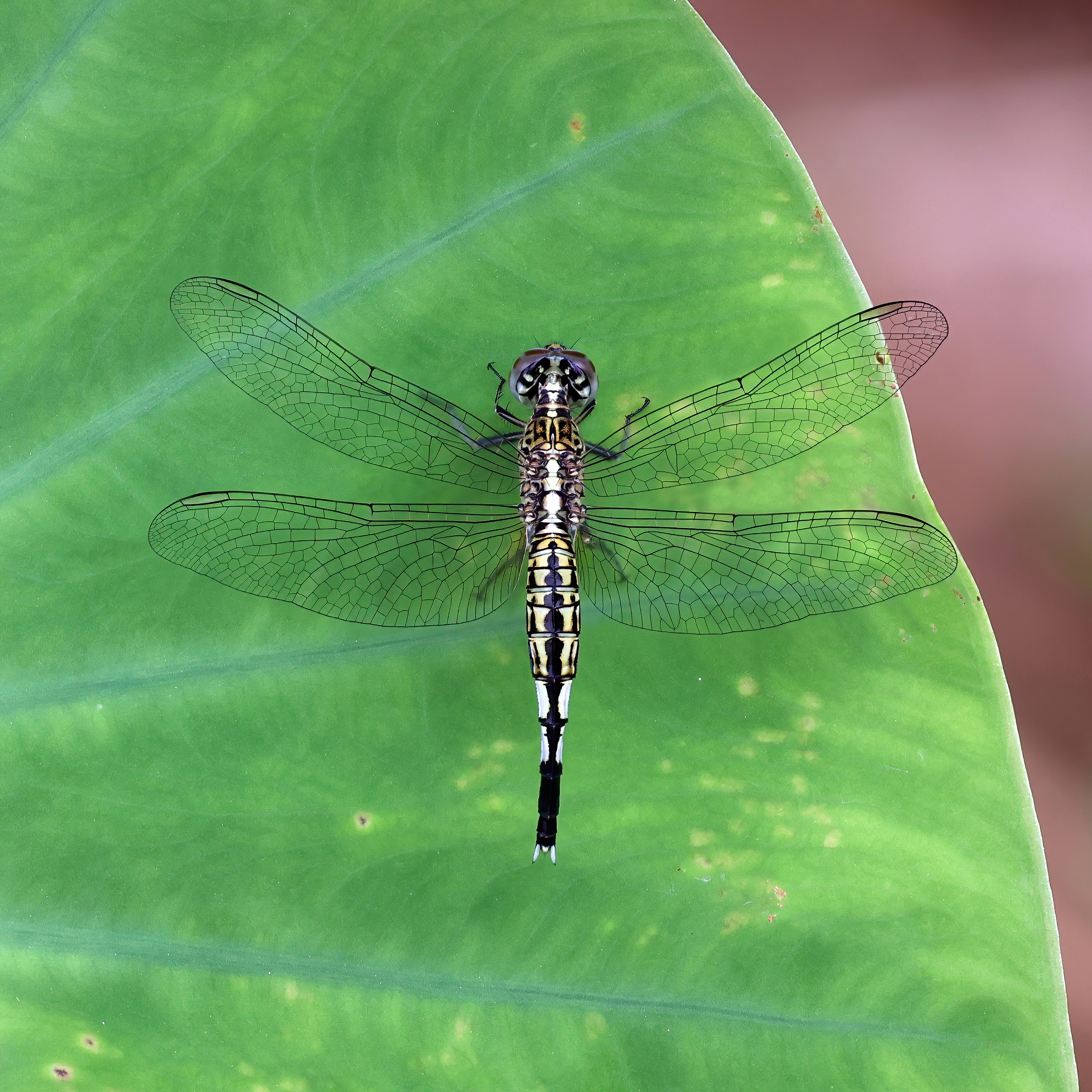
Female

== Habitat ==
It is found in subtropical or tropical swampy or marshy habitats. It has a very weak and short flight and keeps close to the herbage and reeds in the heavily weeded ponds and lakes where it breeds.
