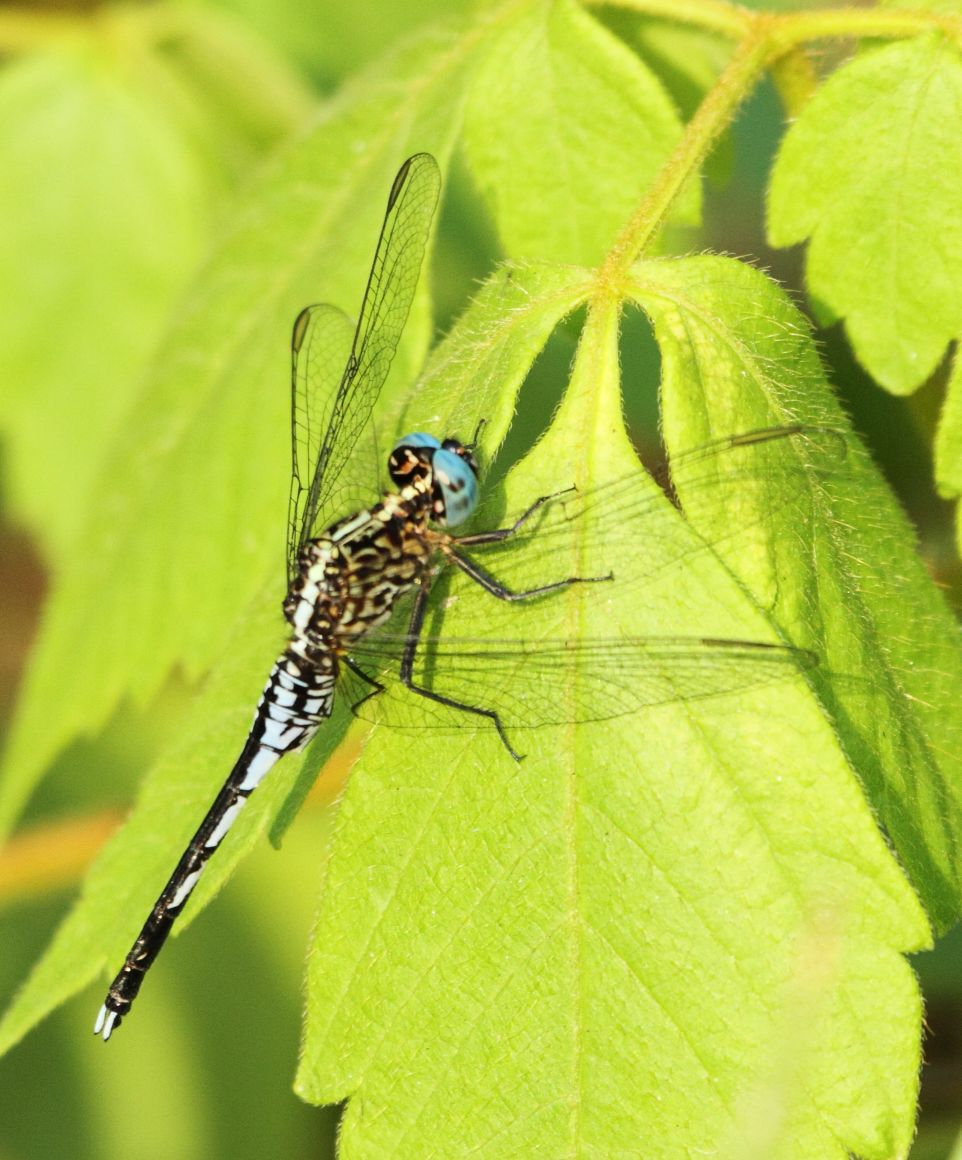
- Male
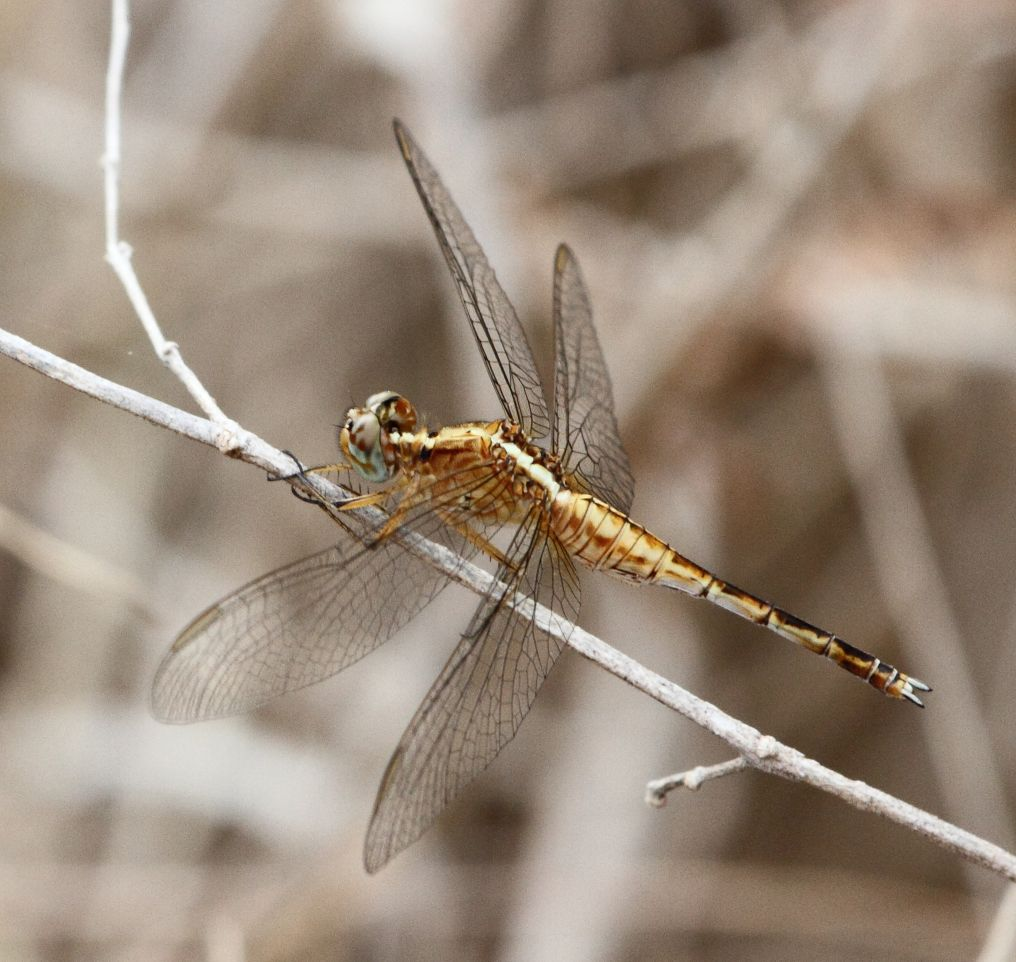
- Female

Conservation status
- Least Concern (IUCN 3.1)

Scientific classification
- Kingdom: Animalia
- Phylum: Arthropoda
- Class: Insecta
- Order: Odonata
- Infraorder: Anisoptera
- Family: Libellulidae
- Genus: Acisoma
- Species: A. variegatum

Binomial name
- Acisoma variegatum Kirby, 1898

= Acisoma variegatum =

Species of dragonfly

Acisoma variegatum, the slender pintail is a species of dragonfly in the family Libellulidae.

== Distribution ==
Eastern and south-eastern Africa; Ethiopia to Katanga and north-eastern South Africa

== Habitat ==
This species is found in open marsh, often in low-lying and expansive areas such as flood plains. Also found near ponds and reservoirs.

== Gallery ==
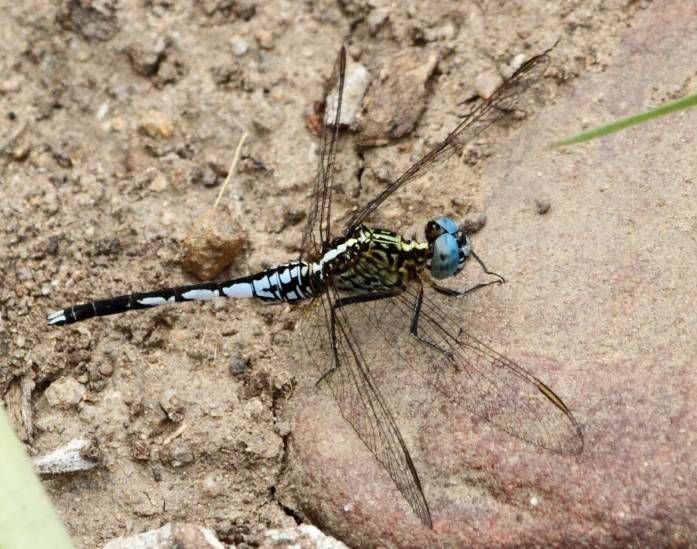
Male

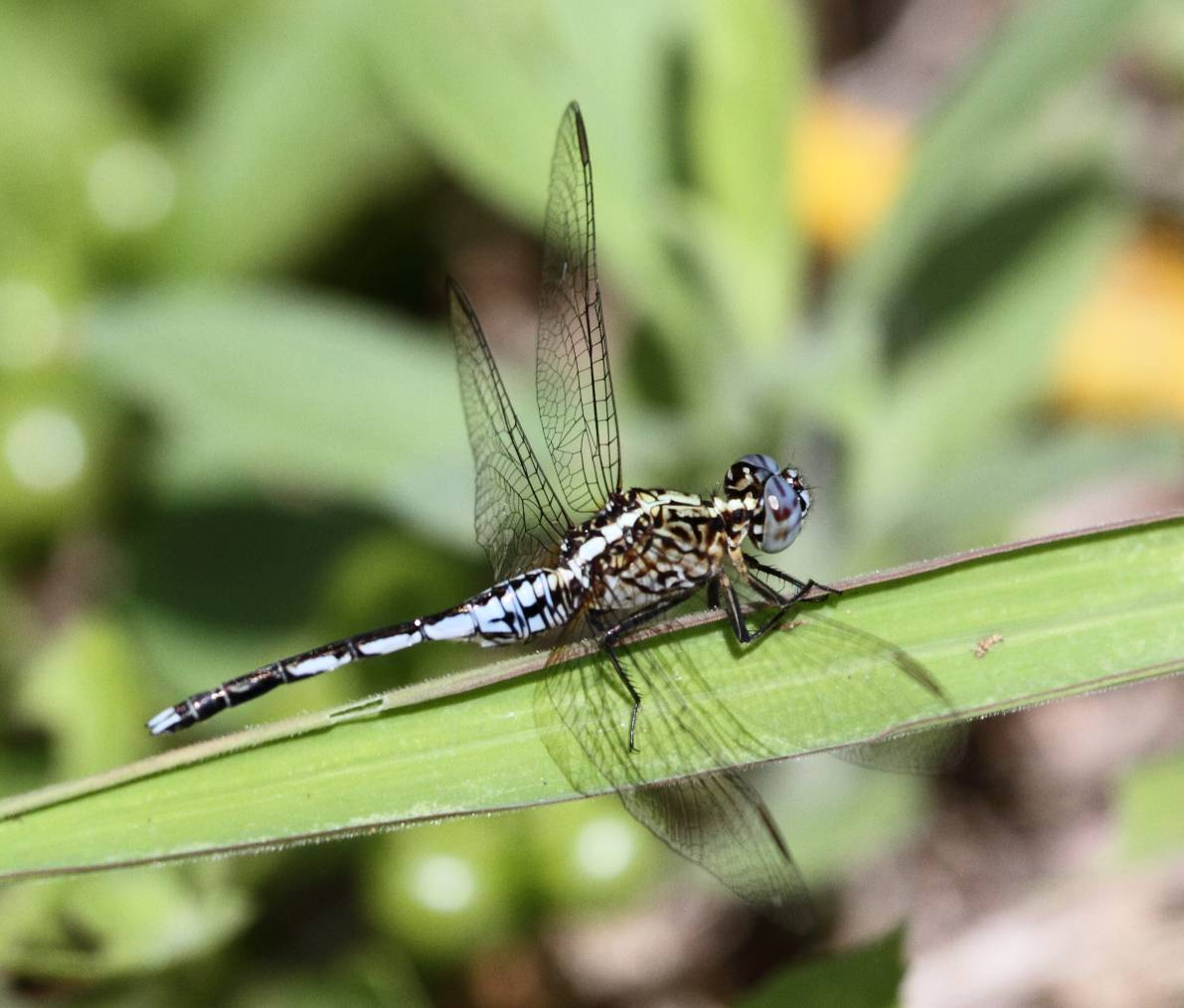
Male

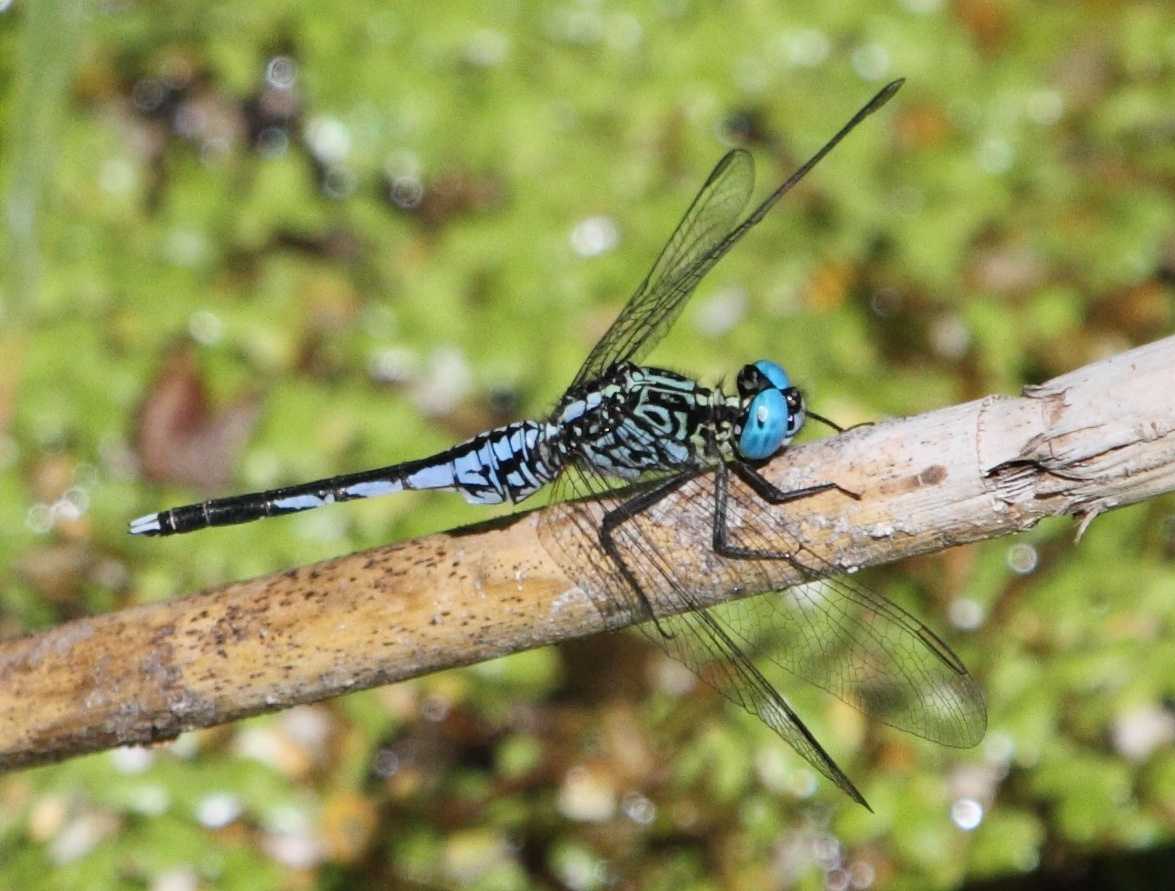
Male

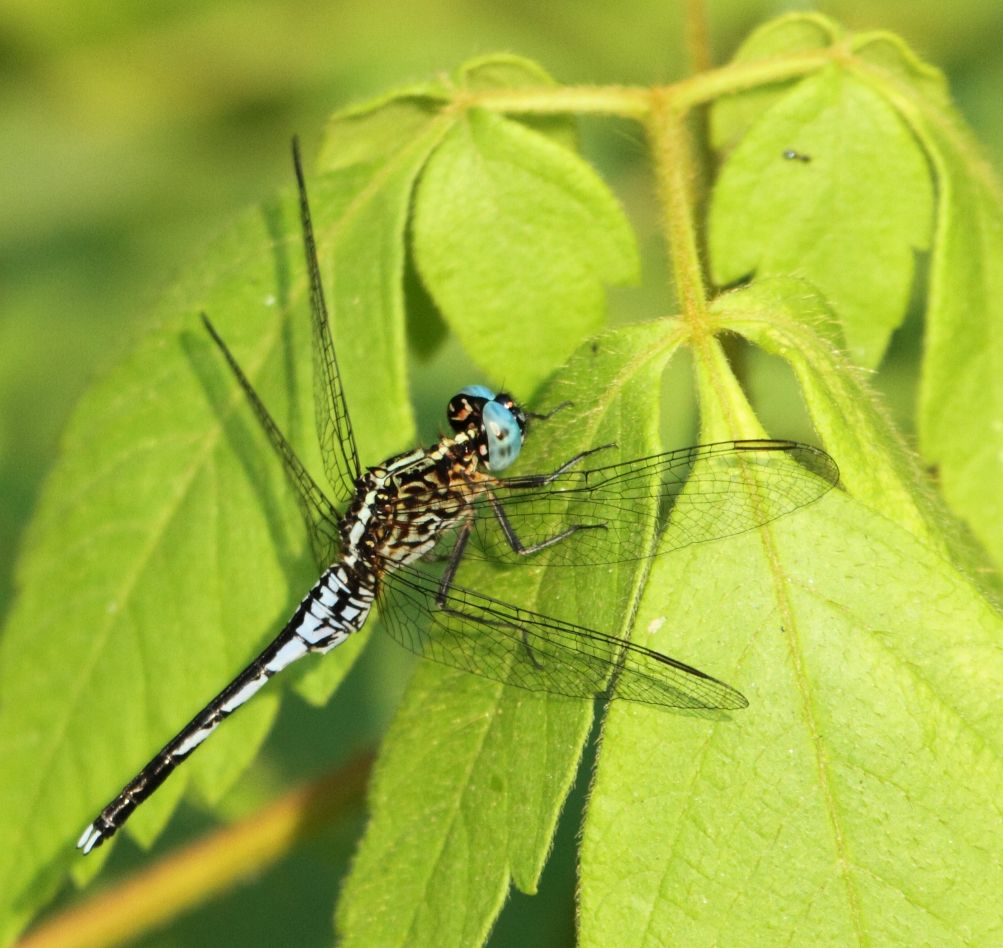
Male

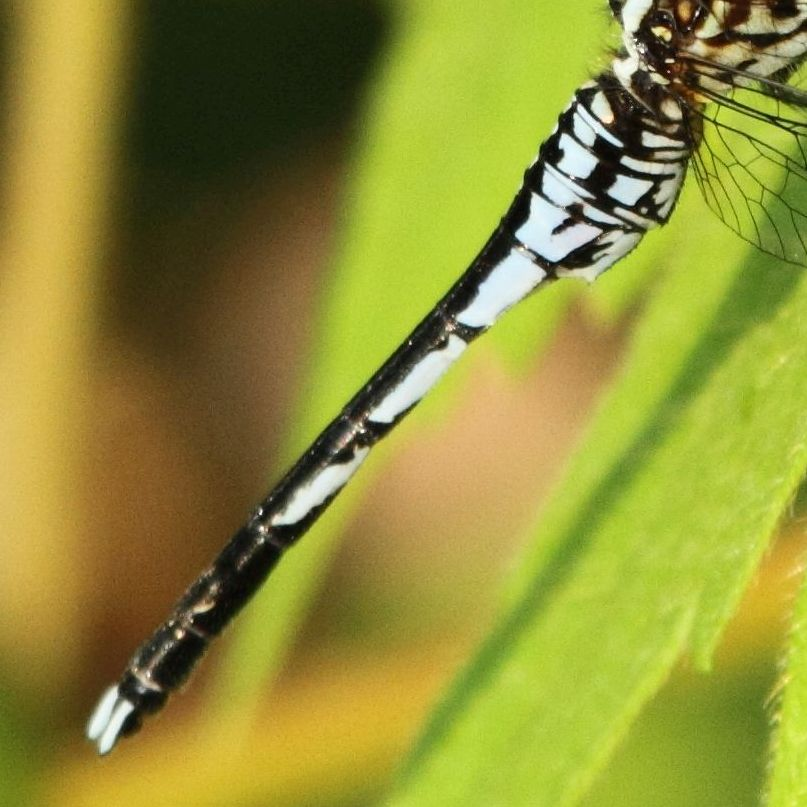
Male abdomen

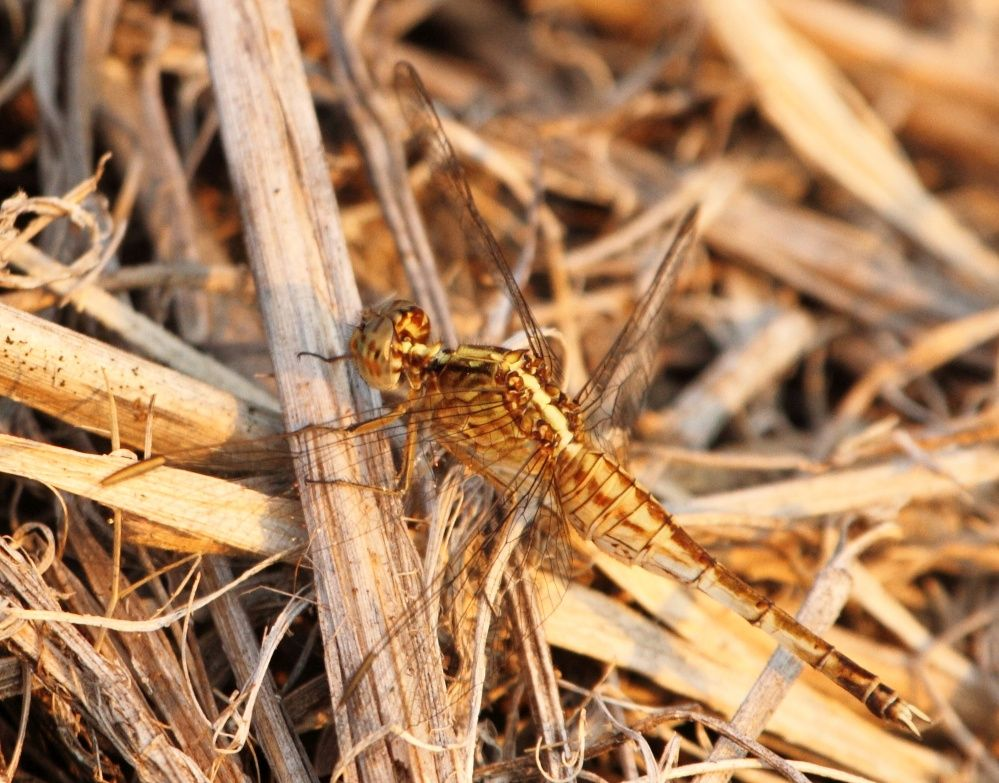
Female
