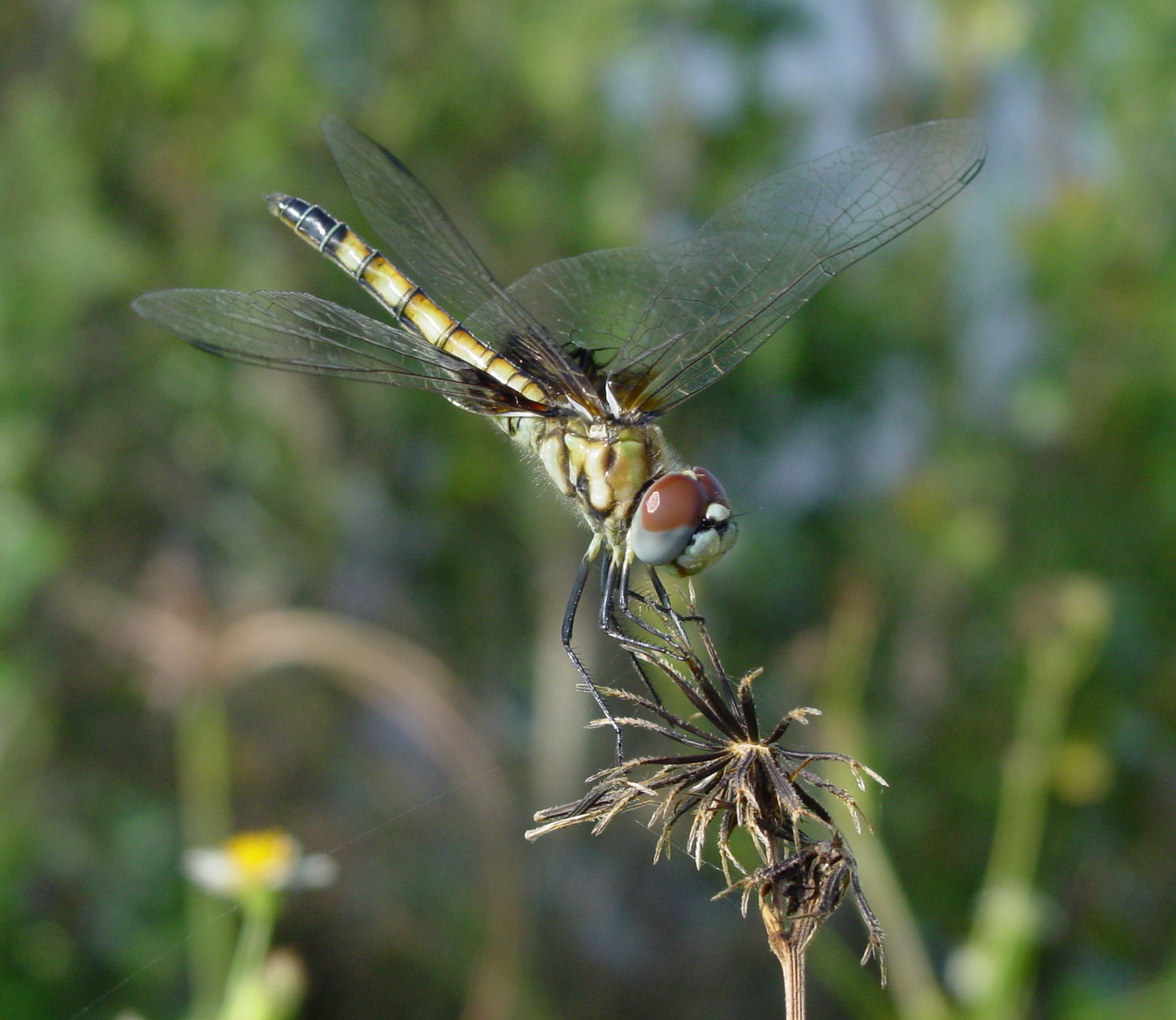
- Male
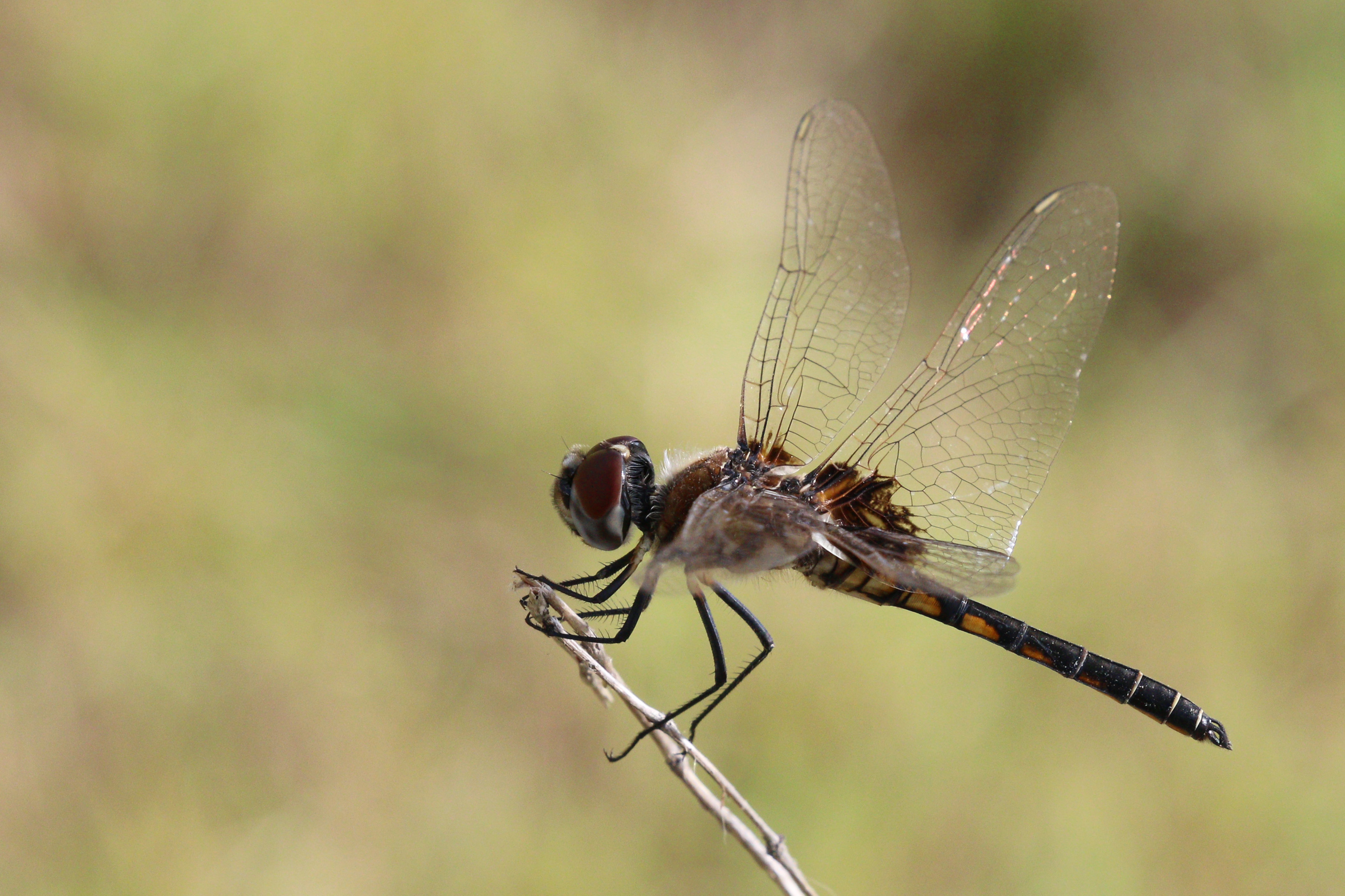
- Female, Grand Cayman

Scientific classification
- Domain: Eukaryota
- Kingdom: Animalia
- Phylum: Arthropoda
- Class: Insecta
- Order: Odonata
- Infraorder: Anisoptera
- Family: Libellulidae
- Genus: Macrodiplax
- Species: M. balteata

Binomial name
- Macrodiplax balteata (Hagen, 1861)

= Macrodiplax balteata =

Species of dragonfly

Macrodiplax balteata, the marl pennant, is a species of dragonfly in the genus Macrodiplax. It occurs in the southern United States, the Caribbean and South America.
