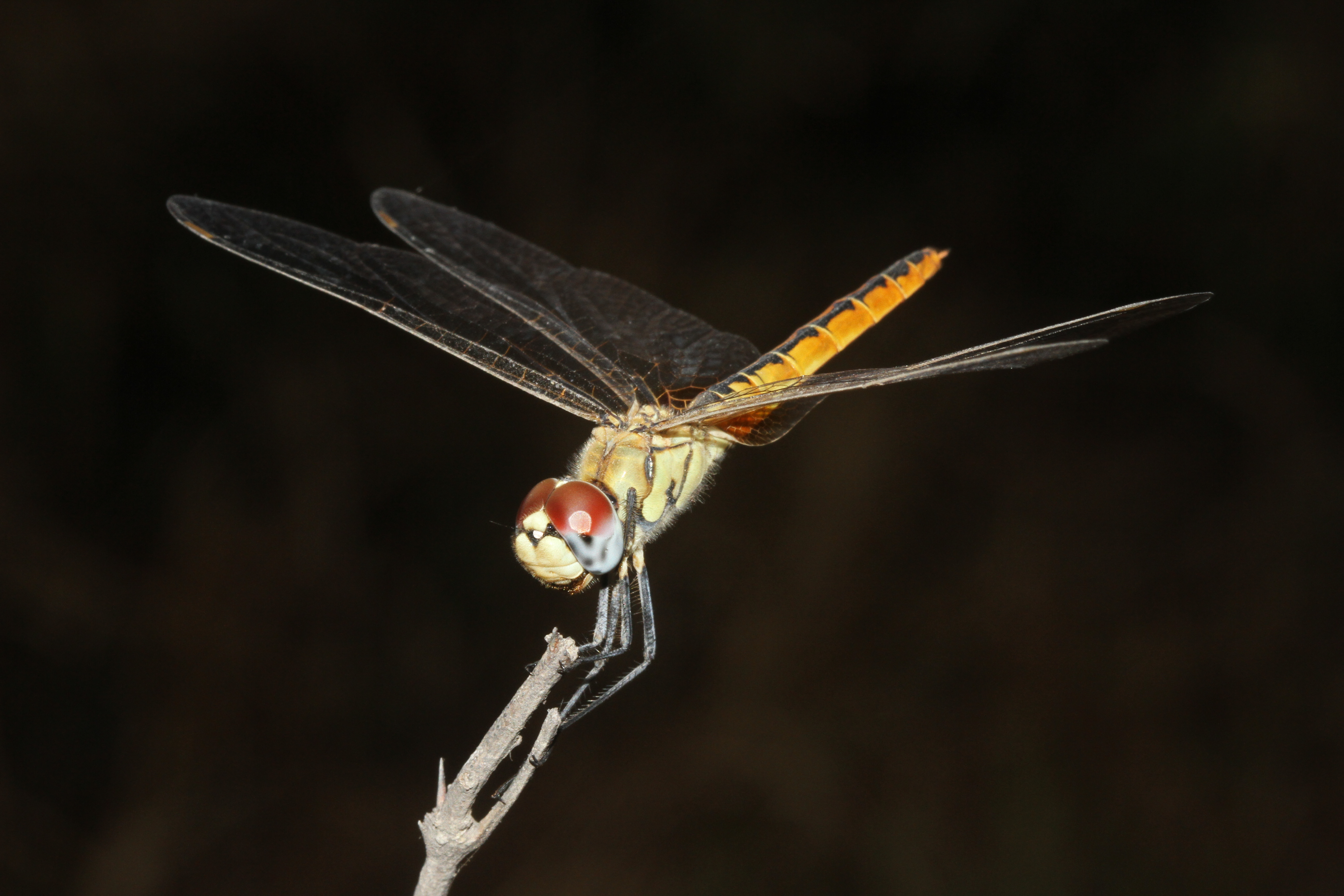
- Macrodiplax cora

Scientific classification
- Kingdom: Animalia
- Phylum: Arthropoda
- Clade: Pancrustacea
- Class: Insecta
- Order: Odonata
- Infraorder: Anisoptera
- Superfamily: Libelluloidea
- Family: Libellulidae
- Genus: Macrodiplax; Brauer, 1868

Type species
- Macrodiplax cora

= Macrodiplax =

Genus of dragonflies

Macrodiplax is a genus of dragonflies in the family Libellulidae. It is found across the tropics and subtropics; however, it is not found in Africa.

== Etymology ==
The genus name Macrodiplax combines the Greek μακρός (makros, "large" or "long") with Diplax, a genus name derived from the Greek δίς (dis, "twice") and πλάξ (plax, "flat and broad"). The name probably refers to the large size of members of the genus.

== Species ==
The genus Macrodiplax includes only two species:

| Male | Female | Scientific name | Common name | Distribution |
|---|---|---|---|---|
| | | Macrodiplax balteata (Hagen, 1861) | Marl Pennant | southern United States, the Caribbean and South America |
| | | Macrodiplax cora (Kaup in Brauer, 1867) | Cora's Pennant, Wandering Pennant | Tropical Asia and Australasia |
