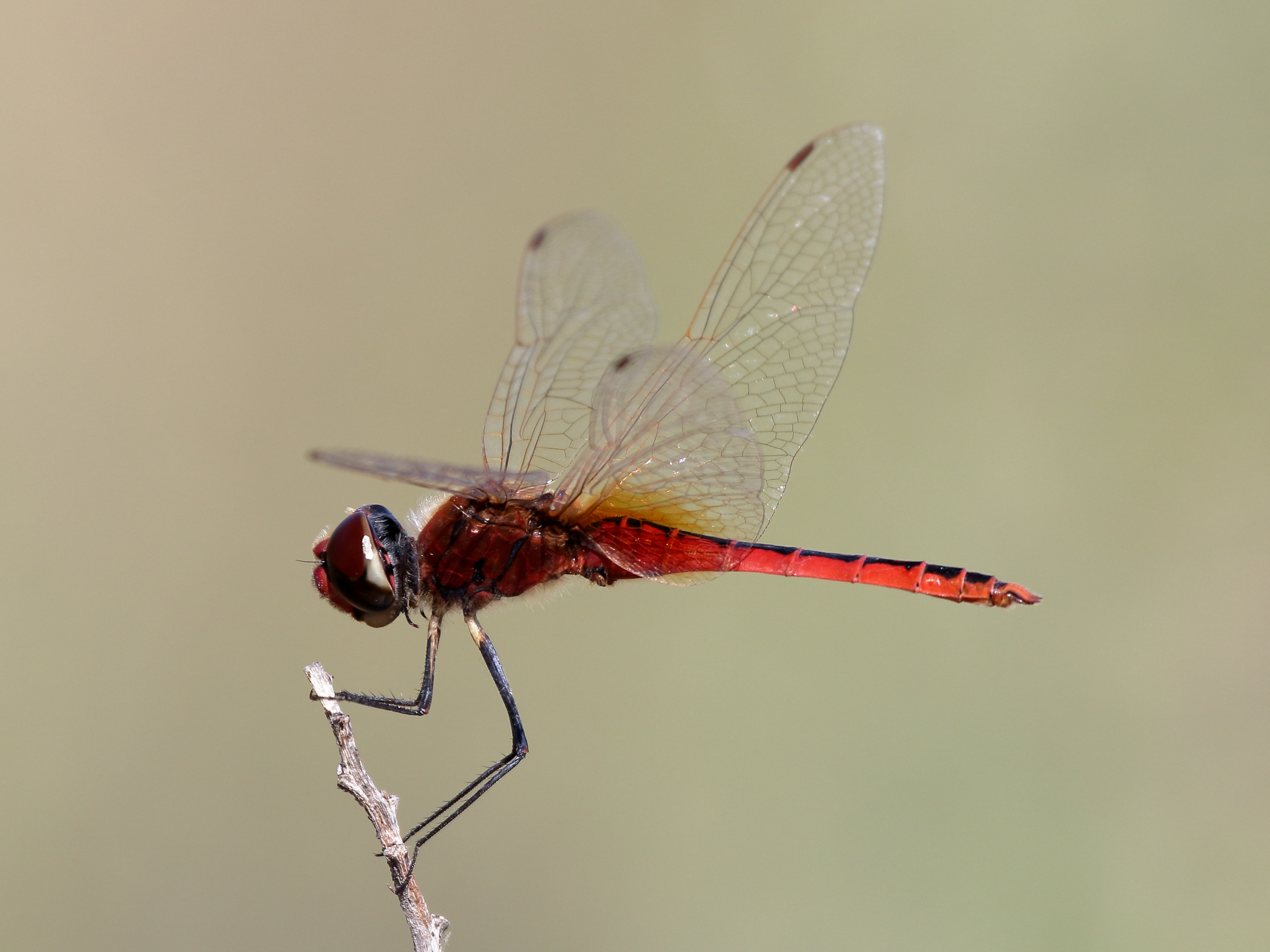
- Male
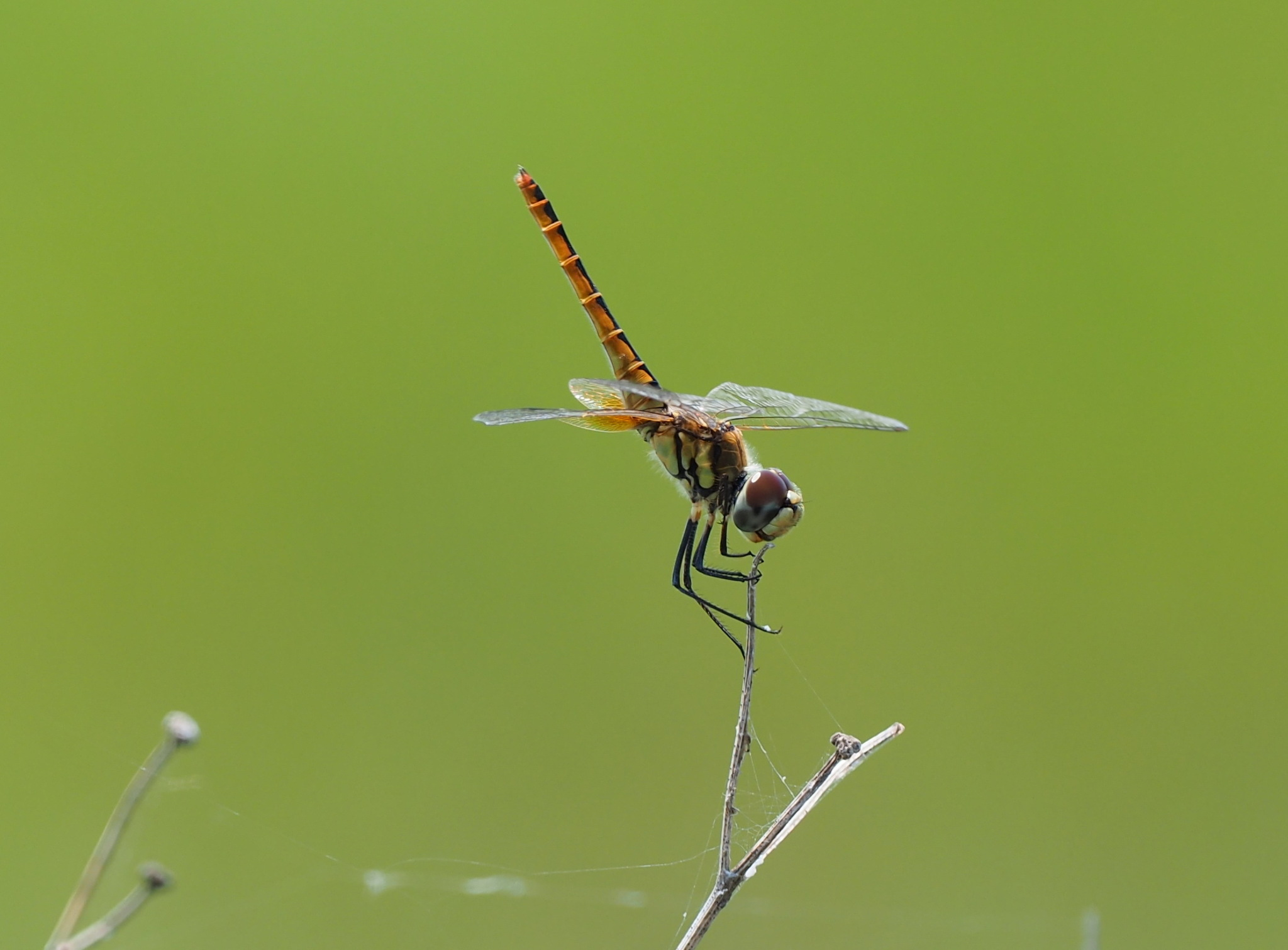
- Female

Conservation status
- Least Concern (IUCN 3.1)

Scientific classification
- Kingdom: Animalia
- Phylum: Arthropoda
- Clade: Pancrustacea
- Class: Insecta
- Order: Odonata
- Infraorder: Anisoptera
- Family: Libellulidae
- Genus: Macrodiplax
- Species: M. cora

Binomial name
- Macrodiplax cora (Kaup, 1867)

Synonyms
- Diplax cora Kaup in Brauer, 1867; Libellula lycoris Selys, 1872; Urothemis nigrilabris Selys, 1878; Urothemis vittata Kirby, 1893

= Macrodiplax cora =

Species of dragonfly

Macrodiplax cora, the coastal glider, also known as wandering pennant, and Cora's pennant, is a species of dragonfly in the family Libellulidae.

== Description ==
An adult male Macrodiplax cora is a medium-sized dragonfly (length 45mm, wingspan 75mm) with a red abdomen, dorsally marked with black patches on each segment. The female abdomen is less brightly colored. The synthorax is a brownish color and may be hirsute. The wings are clear except for a yellowish patch at the base of the hind wing. Its bi-colored legs and hourglass shaped black patches on the abdominal segments will help to easily distinguish them from other red colored dragonflies.

== Distribution and habitat ==
The species undertakes migration and may be nomadic, and is thus widespread in tropical Asia and Australasia. It occurs in South Asia, Australia and a variety of Indian and Pacific Oceans Islands. It prefers coastal lagoons, estuaries and swamps, as it is somewhat salt-tolerant.

== Etymology ==
The genus name Macrodiplax combines the Greek μακρός (makros, "large" or "long") with Diplax, a genus name derived from the Greek δίς (dis, "twice") and πλάξ (plax, "flat and broad"). The name probably refers to the large size of members of the genus.

The species name cora is derived from the Greek κόρη (korē, "girl" or "maiden"), probably referring to a female given name.

== Gallery ==
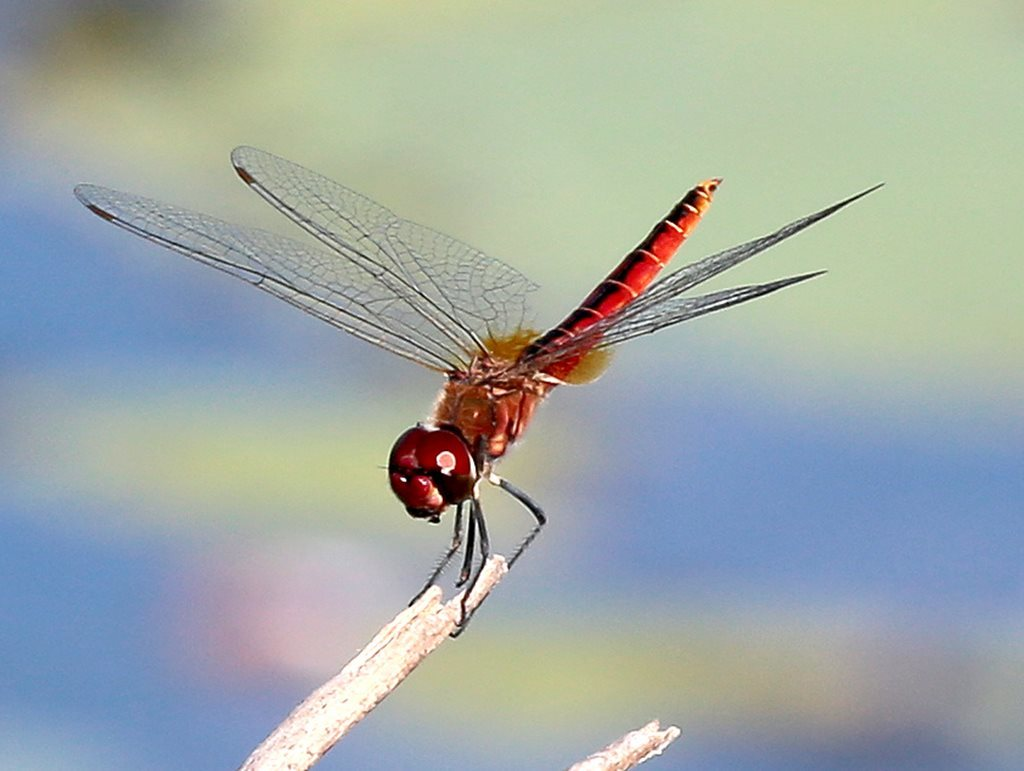
Male perching

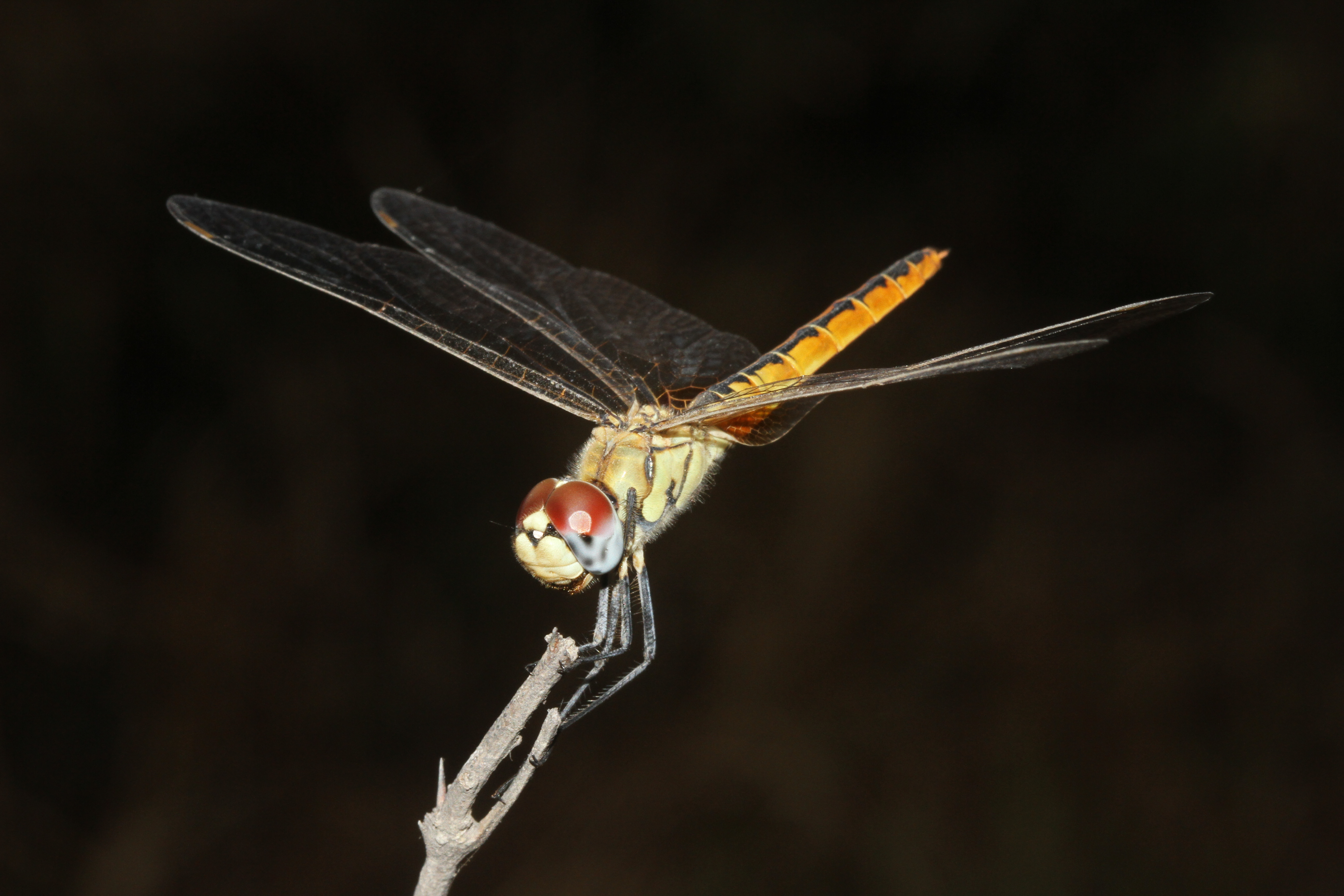
Female perching

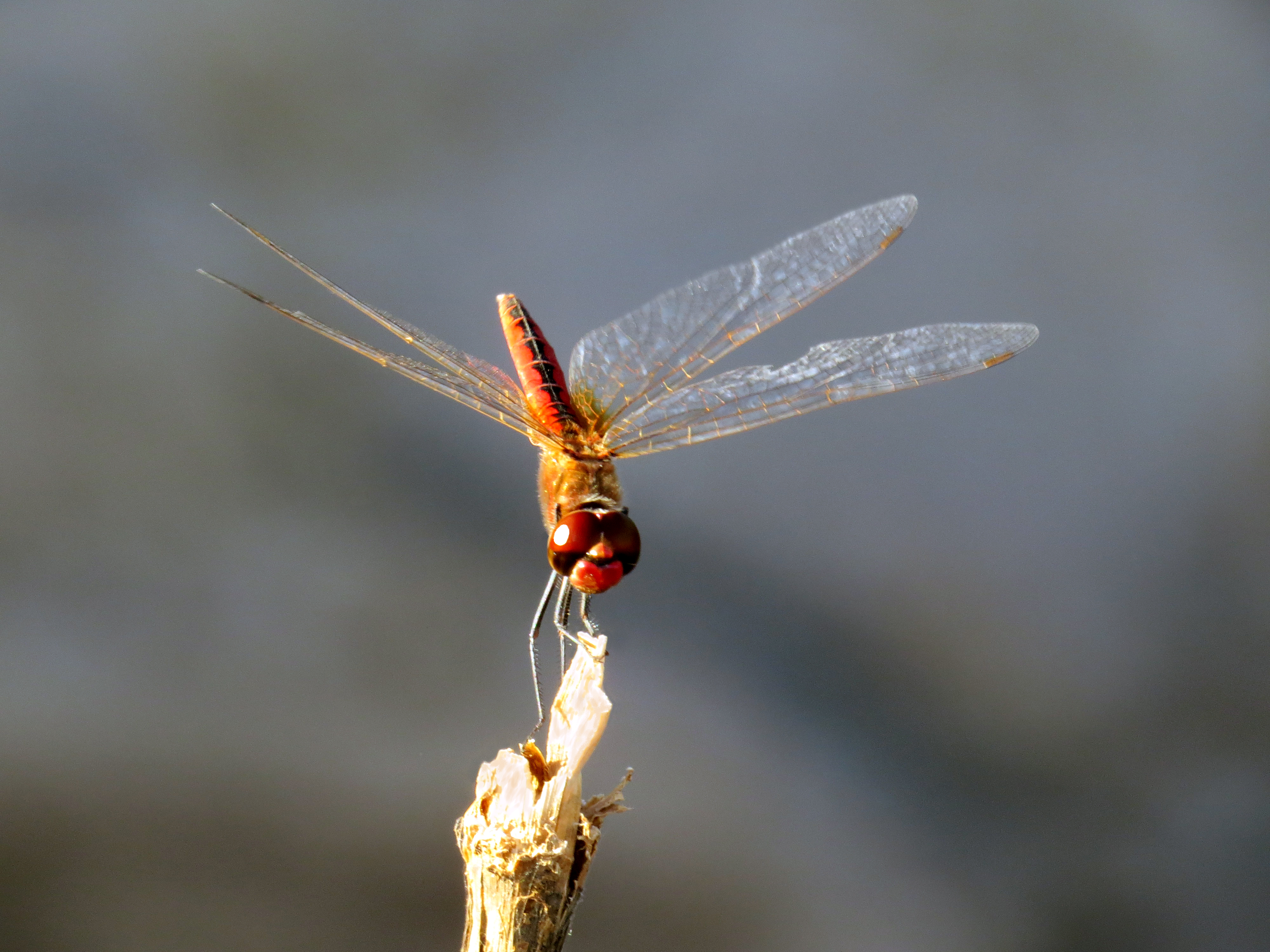
Male, Leichhardt Falls, Queensland

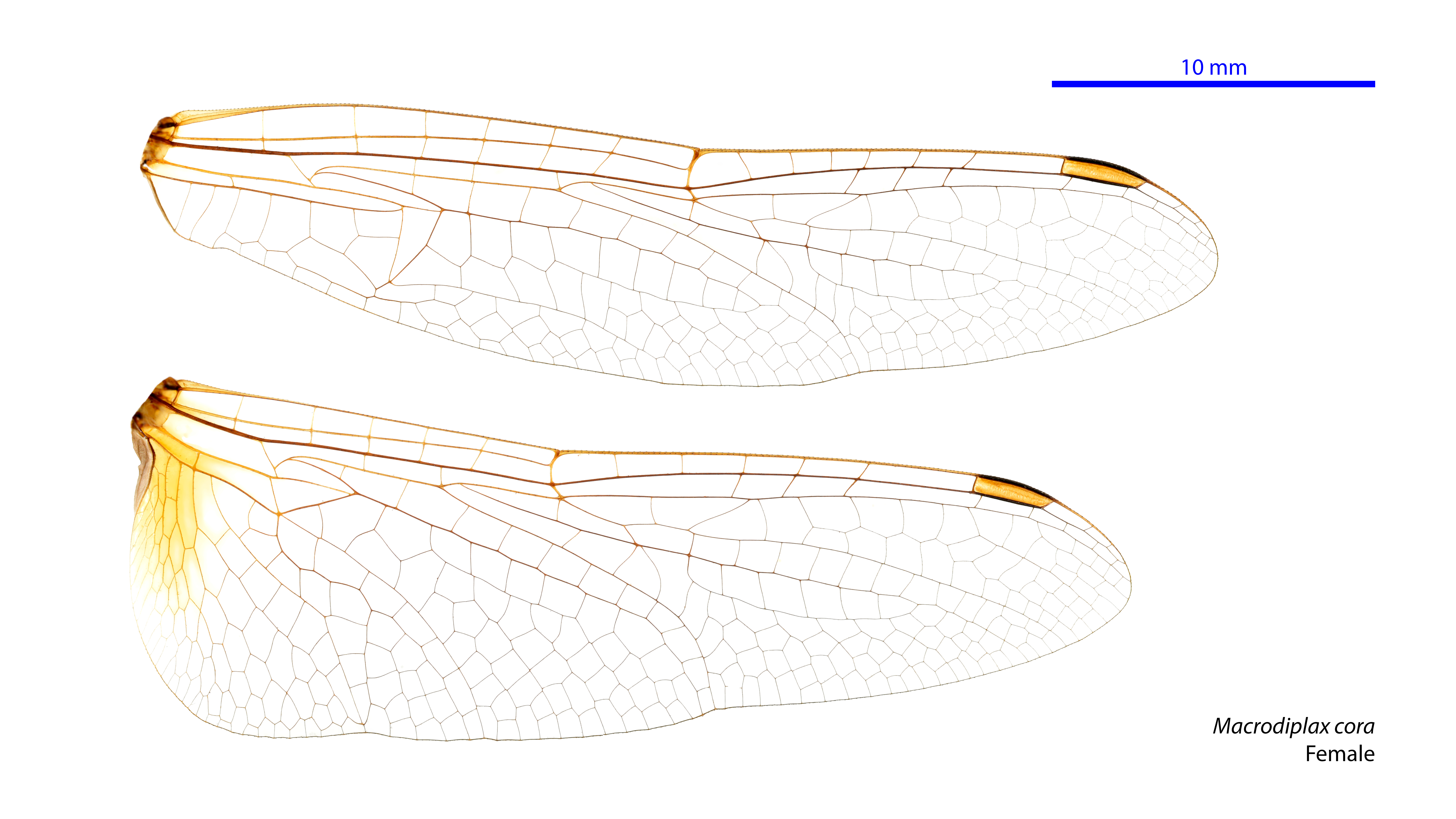
Female wings

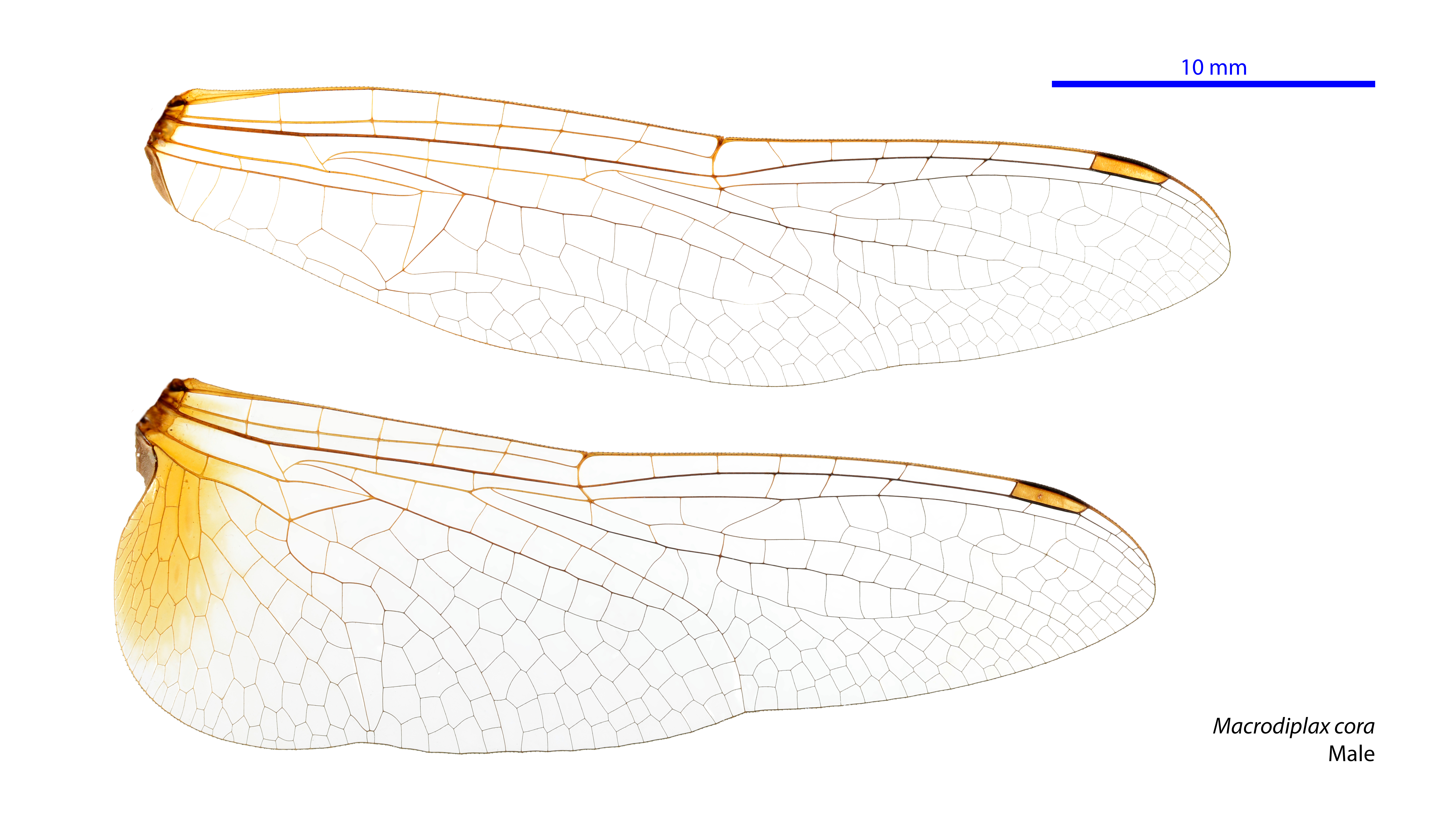
Male wings

== See also ==
- List of odonates of Sri Lanka
- List of odonates of India
- List of odonata of Kerala
- List of Odonata species of Australia
