= Roman villa of Outeiro de Polima =

- Interactive map of Roman villa of Outeiro de Polima
- 38°42′57.7″N 9°19′43.2″W
- Type: Ruins
- Location: Lisbon, Greater Lisbon, Lisbon, Portugal

Site notes
- Archaeologists: Virgílio Correia; Guilherme Cardoso; José d'Encarnação
- Owner: Portuguese Republic
- Public access: Private EM 584

The Roman villa of Outeiro de Polima (Portuguese: Villa Romana de Outeiro de Polima) is a Roman villa in the civil parish of São Domingos de Rana, in the Portuguese municipality of Cascais, dating from the 1st to 6th centuries AD.

== History ==
The administrative area of Cascais has been the centre of multiple testaments to active human occupation in various millennia, especially the Roman era, associated with the construction of industry and villas. The town was constructed during the height of Roman influence within the Iberian peninsula, roughly between 1st and 6th century.

But, the collection of archaeological artefacts (silex, weights and ceramics) point to the Paleolithic and Middle Age settlement, with studies by archaeologists Guilherme Cardoso and José d'Encarnação demonstrating several generations of agricultural stratification.

Outeiro de Polima has been a site important archaeological interest, due to the existence of a villa, whose vestiges extend to Cabeço do Mouro. In addition, there are numerous fragments of construction materials, imbrex, tiles and amphorae, that confirms the existence of a local villa, reinforced by opus signinum pavement stratification. Additionally, there are proto-historic discoveries of industrial lithic silex and ceramics from late Bronze Age.

Sometime around 1913, Virgílio Correia discovered the Roman outpost.

New archaeological campaigns were undertaken in 1973, under the direction of archaeologist Guilherme Cardoso, where they discovered a large quantity of artefacts and material.

== See also ==
- Olisipo
- Roman villa of Freiria
- Roman villa of Alto do Cidreira
- Castro de Leceia
