= São Domingos de Rana =

- Civil parish
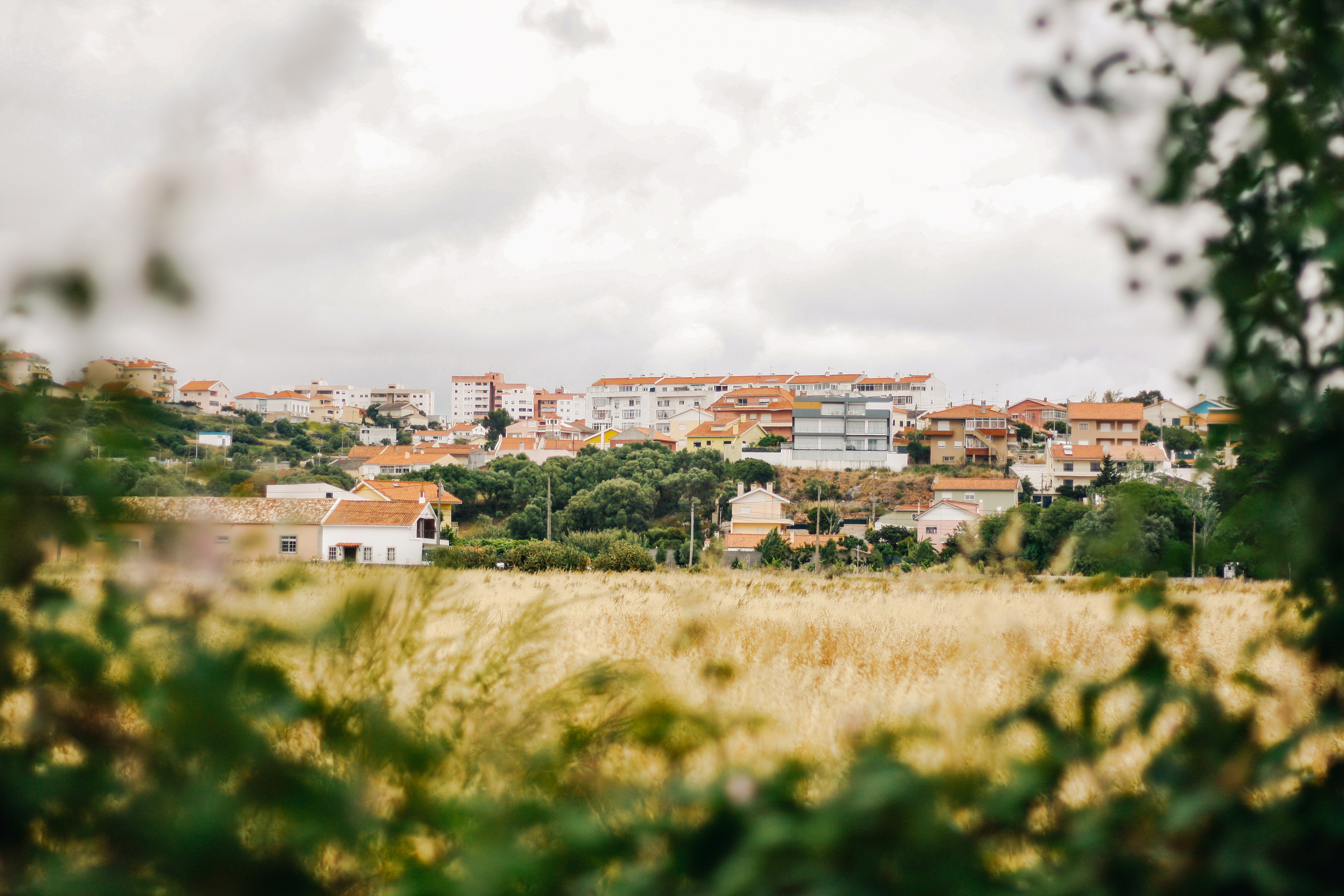
- A view of the residential area of Penedo

- Coat of arms

- Location in Portugal
- Coordinates: 38.702°N 9.340°W
- Country: Portugal
- Region: Lisbon
- Metropolitan area: Lisbon
- District: Lisbon
- Municipality: Cascais

Area
  - Total: 20.36 km^{2} (7.86 sq mi)

Population (2011)
  - Total: 57,502
  - Density: 2,824/km^{2} (7,315/sq mi)
- Time zone: UTC+00:00 (WET)
  - Summer (DST): UTC+01:00 (WEST)
- Postal code: 2785
- Area code: 214
- Patron: Saint Dominic
- Website: http://www.jf-sdrana.pt

São Domingos de Rana (Portuguese pronunciation: [sɐ̃w duˈmĩɡuʒ ðɨ ˈʁɐnɐ]) is a civil parish (Portuguese: freguesia) of the Portuguese municipality of Cascais, part of the Greater Lisbon subregion. The population in 2011 was 57,502, in an area of 20.36 km^{2}. The parish includes the localities Abóboda, Cabeço de Mouro, Caparide, Matarraque, Outeiro de Polima, Polima, Rana, Talaíde, Tires, Trajouce and Zambujal.

== History ==
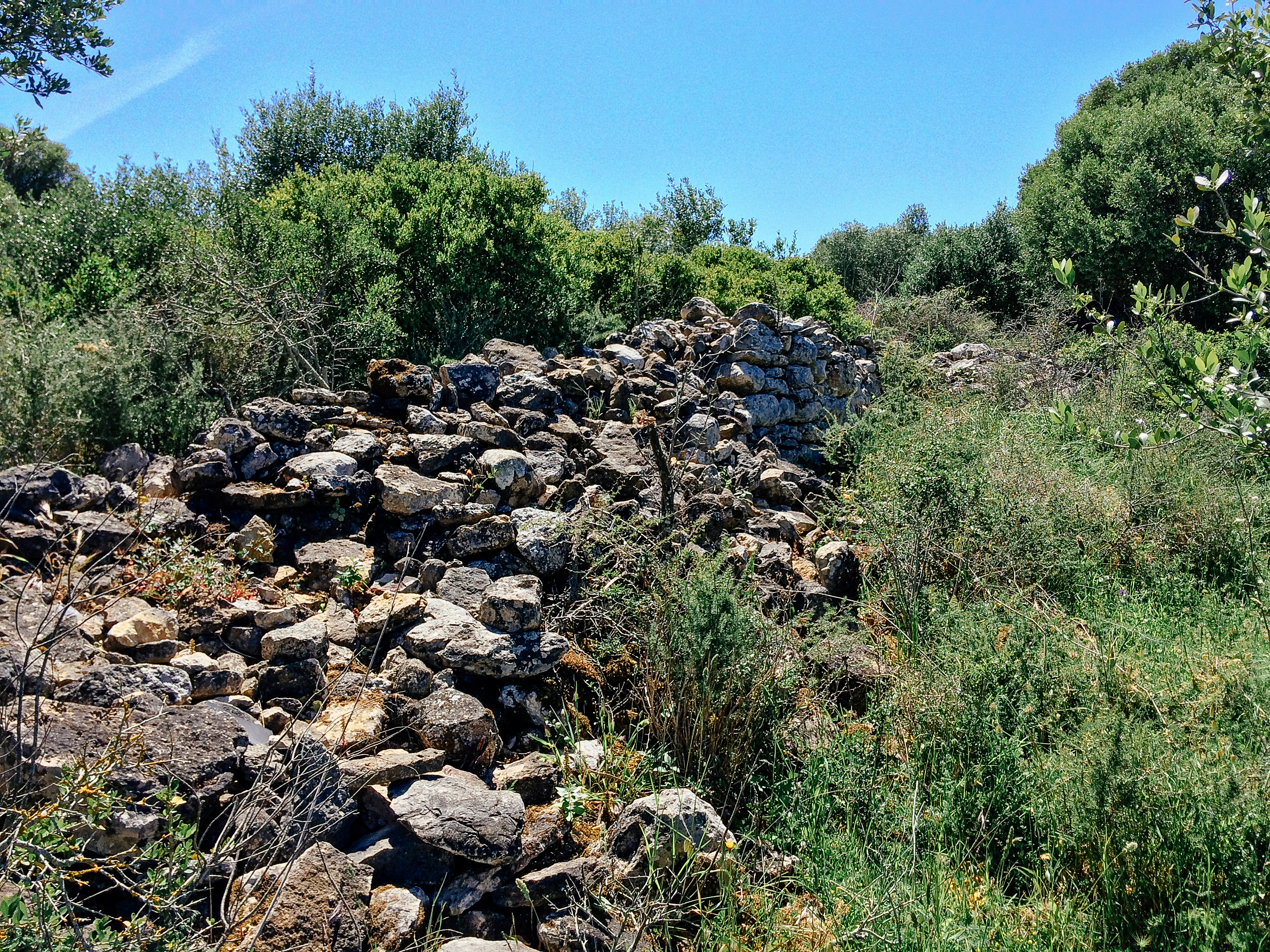
The ruins and debris of the Roman villa of Miroiço

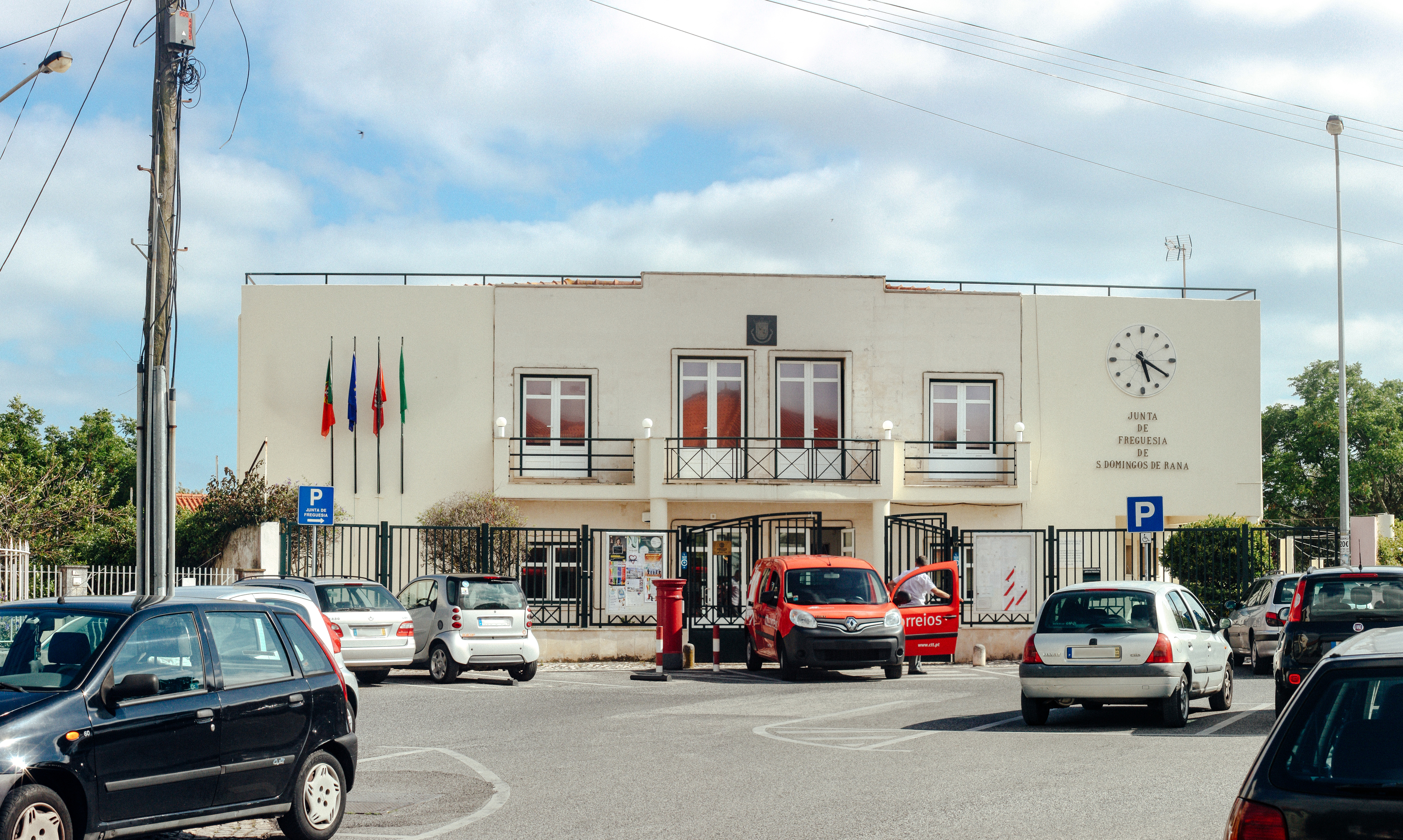
The Junta de Freguesia building of São Domingos da Rana

The settlement of São Domingos de Rana, is associated with the fertility of the soils and the abundance of spring-waters: the number of archaeological vestiges in the parish implies its place in the settlement of the municipality. In many localities of the parish, human occupation has been almost permanent since the Paleolithic. The archaeological graves in the region attest to agricultural and hunting cultures. This parishes origins date to the settlement of the territory during the Paleolithic to Medieval. The first historical references originated in the Middle Age, one attesting to the existence of locality of Trajouce and the other that mentioned (in 1385) the casal in Freira.

The first census referred, in 1527, referred to all the current localities in the parish. At that time, there was already a parish of São Domingos de Rana, that extended to Albarraque, expanding in 1758 to São Pedro do Estoril. Until 1838, the area was part of the municipality of Oeiras, before integrated into Cascais.

For four decades the territory was exclusively agricultural, cultivating wheat, corn and vegetables, in addition to vineyards. Also, the region was known for the extraction of stone used in the construction. In 1983, professor José d’Encarnação described São Domingos de Rana as an area known of cereal harvests, but was slowly threatened by the growth of the city, and the industrial production of Abóboda. With its accelerated growth, and lack of planning, resulted in the growth of illegal barrios. On 3 March 1976, the Ministérios da Habitação, Urbanismo e Construção and Ministério dos Assuntos Sociais created an interministerial group (the Comissão para o Alojamento de Refugiados - CAR) in order to coordinate and develop solutions for the housing ex-colonial Africans and refugees, then living in emergency housing in Lisbon or along the Algarve. The development of the CAR neighbourhood of Faceiras, in three phases, began on 18 August 1977 with the construction of 81 homes. The following year (resolution 99/78) this program was integrated with other projects by the commission and the Fundo de Fomento da Habitação (FFH) (Housing Development Fund) to sustain the program (17 June 1978).

== Geography ==
With 20 square kilometres (7.7 mi^{2}), São Domingos de Rana is one of the four parishes in the municipality of Cascais. In 1970 its resident population included 18,140 inhabitants, expanding to 29,342 (in 1981), 35,938 (in 1991) and 43,991 (in 2001): the 2011, included a population of 57,502 inhabitants.

The protected Costa do Sol-Guincho area is situated along the southern margin at the mouth of the Tagus River, east of Lisbon, with the Serra de Sintra to the northwest and Linha de Sintra to the north: it includes the municipalities of Cascais and Oeiras. It partially includes a portion of the Sintra-Cascais Nature Park (Regulatory Decree 8/94, 11 March 1994), and was also included in the Natura 2000 designation for the site of Sintra-Cascais (Council of Ministers Resolution 142/97, 28 August 1997).

== Architecture ==
=== Civic ===
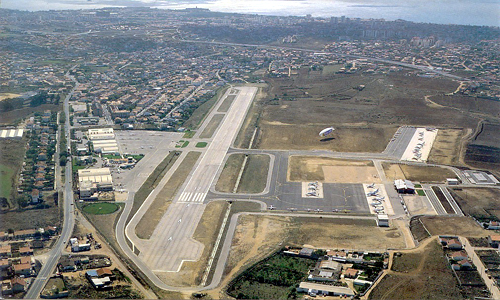
The renamed Lisbon Cascais-Tejo Regional Airport (former Cascais Municipal Aerodrome) and original Aerodrome of Tires, located in the locality of the same name

- Cascais Municipal Aerodrome (Portuguese: Aeródromo de Tires), inaugurated on 11 October 1964, by Portuguese President Américo Tomás, the airport developed under the initiative of the Secretário de Estado da Aeronáutica (Secretary of State for Aeronautics) and Direcção-Geral da Aeronáutica Civil (General-Directorate for Civil Aeronatuics), in addition to the Count of Monte Real; planned for the zone of Areia-Guincho, it was installed in Tires, by the Direcção-Geral and military aeronautics which continued into 1973
- Casal Saloio de Outeiro de Polima
- Estate of Rana (Portuguese: Quinta da Rana)
- Estate of Gafanhotos (Portuguese: Quinta dos Gafanhotos)
- Estate of Livramento (Portuguese: Quinta no Livramento)
- Gardens of Quinta dos Pesos (Portuguese: Jardim da Quinta dos Pesos)
- Roman villa of Freira (Portuguese: Villa romana de Freiria), Virgílio Correia was the first to refer to the Roman remains in this zone, after discovering a stone Roman burial mound. The archaeologist discovered a number of fragments of ceramics that date the location to the pre-historic period and the village to about the 4th or 2nd century, which includes the mill and quarters;
- Roman villa of Miroiças (Portuguese: Villa romana de Miroiças), it is the largest Roman villa in the municipality, with a great abundance of materials and superficial content, dating from the Paleolithic and Middle Ages, noting the longest period of human occupation;
- Roman villa of Outeiro de Polima (Portuguese: Villa Romana de Outeiro de Polima), dating to the Roman epoch, when it was constructed, it was discovered by Virgílio Correia in 1913. New excavations were carried-out in 1973, under the archeologist Guilherme Cardoso, whom discovered a large quantity of materials;

=== Religious ===
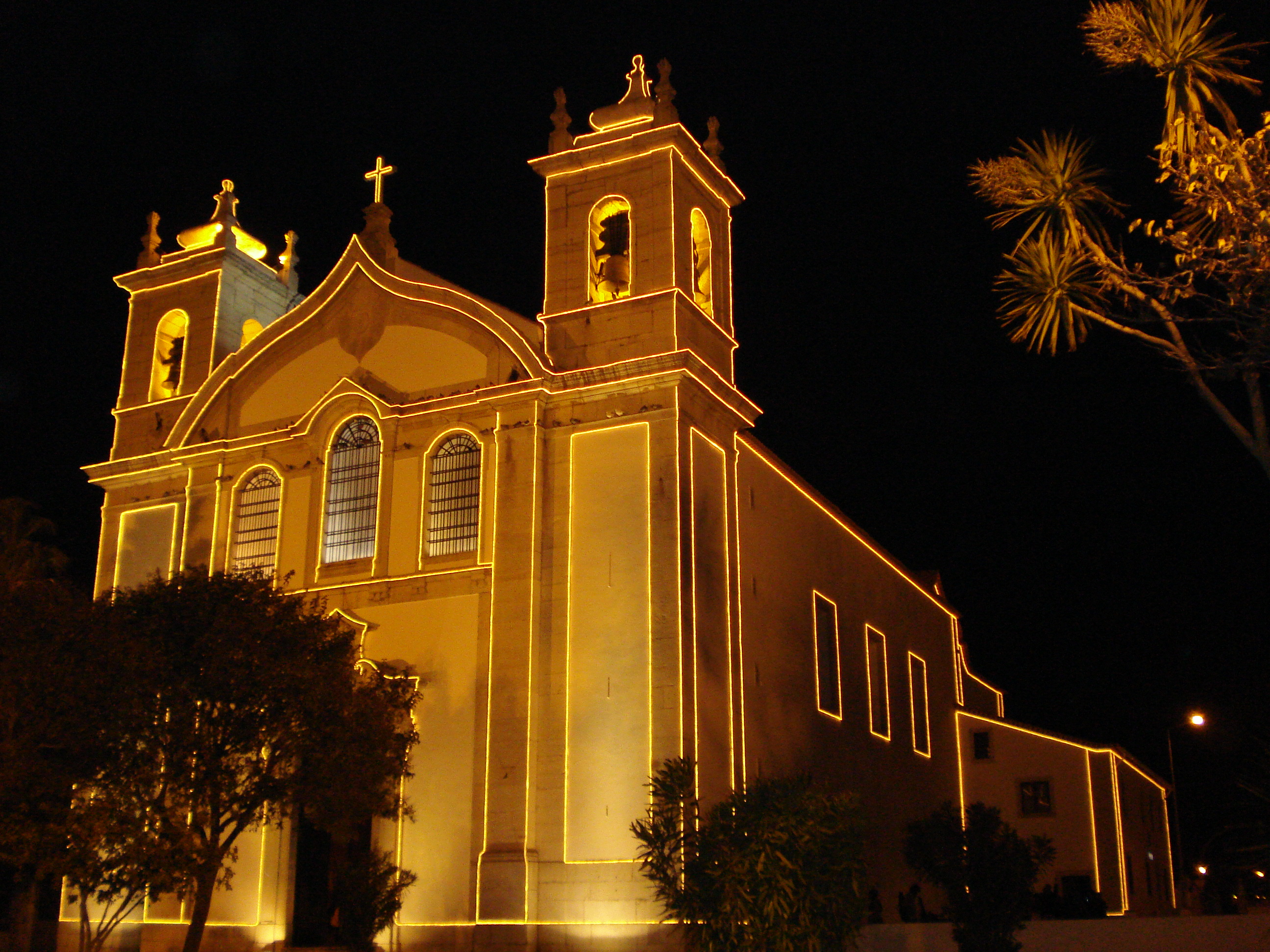
The parochial church of São Domingos de Gusmão illuminated by Christmas lights (2008)

- Church of São Domingos de Gusmão (Portuguese: Igreja Paroquial de São Domingos de Rana/Igreja de São Domingos de Gusmão), its construction dates to 1710, but its conclusion was limited due to the events of the 1755 Lisbon earthquake: it was concluded in 1838 (a date inscribed on the belltower). Between 1911 and 1918, the temple was closed and much of its content began to ruin. By August 2001, a new carillon, with 23 bells, 19 constructed in Braga, 3 pre-existing and one from a factory in Belgium, was inaugurated for the church, electrified and computerized, but manually operatable;
- Chapel of Conceição (Portuguese: Capela da Conceição)

== Education ==
In the locality of Outeiro de Polima is the Saint Dominic's International School.
