= Senhor dos Mártires archaeological site =

Archaeological Site of Senhor dos Mártires
- Archaeological Site of the Lord of Martyrs
- Interactive map of Archaeological Site of Senhor dos Mártires
- 38°22′25.34″N 8°31′17.57″W
- Type: Necropolis
- Location: Sétubal, Alentejo Litoral, Alentejo, Portugal

Site notes
- Elevation: 42 m (138 ft)
- Length: 177.75 m (583.2 ft)
- Width: 85.98 m (282.1 ft)
- Archaeologists: unknown
- Owner: Portuguese Republic
- Public access: Private Alongside, 125 metres (410 ft) from the Church of Senhor dos Mártires; accessible from Rua Bom Jesus dos Mártires and Rua Senhor dos Mátires

The Archaeological Site of Senhor dos Mártires (Portuguese: Estação Arqueológica do Senhor dos Mártires) is an archaeological site associated with Greek interventions in the Alentejo, in civil parish of Santa Maria do Castelo, municipality of Alcácer do Sal.

== History ==
The site was occupied between 5th and 3rd century B.C., as a place of incineration and cemetery for Iron Age cultures of the region. Of the personal objects found within the tombs of the deceased were Greek ceramics from the 4th and 3rd Century. The objects uncovered, were left in the cremation ustrinum or collected in earthen vessels, then buried at shallow depths, accompanied by objects of the deceased or sacrificial vessels. There were no burial chambers or cists.

It was only during the last quarter of 19th century that this site became a target of interest and a systematic study, by the architect and founder of the present Associação dos Arqueólogos Portugueses (Association of Portuguese Archaeologists), J. Possidónio N. da Silva. The archaeological remains were first discovered in 1874, investigated in 1875 and re-discovered in 1895. Despite working with little evidence, other than those discovered in the vast necropolis, Silva assigned the artifacts to a Roman presence, where various rituals are clearly identifiable. During these excavations hundreds of objects were unearthed, including weapons, vases and jewelry.

Between 1926 and 1927, a systematic excavation of the site was completed by Virgílio Correia. It was those artefacts with undoubtedly strong parallels to Eastern Mediterranean cultures which elicited a greater curiosity by the archaeologist, who then suggested a continuation of early sporadic research at the site. With a rich presence of weapons, vessels and jewelry, Virgilio Correia urged that a systematic excavation be completed, along with other researchers who had demonstrated a remarkable interest in its detailed study, based on objects now exhibited in several museums (including the National Archaeology Museum).

== Architecture ==
The site in a rural hillside, is buried in an olive orchard, 1,000 metres (3,300 ft) west of Alcácer, alongside the Church of Senhor dos Mártires.

Four types of burials were found on the site, all were cremations:

- An urn or ossuary-jar covered with beaker with a conical edging, which contained ashes and cremated bone, which were deposited a shallow depth, over weapons, jewellery and other objects that pertained to the deceased, which were likely collected after the cremation and placed around the ossuary;
- A second type, consisting of ovular ossuary-jar, covered with small slabs of schist, or concave baskets (containing ash and bones), which were placed at the bottom of a rock or concave space, opened for this purpose;
- A third type discovered, were funerary deposits comprising residue from bone and ash, small vassals, weapons and jewellery, which indicated some fire event, but abandoned without any regard, alongside the main sites; and,
- Finally, a funerary deposit comprising carbonized bone, small vessels, weapons, jewellery and other objects, which also suffered from degradation by incendiary, but guarded in a concave space, where a rectangular pan was carved-out in the dimensions of a body, with limestone blocks to the part superior. These pits were oriented east to west, about 2 metres (6.6 ft) in length, the largest occupying an area of 4 metres (13 ft) length.

Of the artifacts discovered, there are indigenous objects (armaments and warrior's clothing) and objects imported from the Mediterranean (such as ceramics and fine jewellery).
