= St. Dominic's International School =

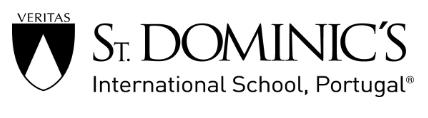

Location
- São Domingos de Rana, Cascais; Portugal
- Coordinates: 38°42′47″N 9°19′45″W

Information
- Motto: Veritas (Truth)
- Established: 1954
- Director: Stephen Blackburn
- Grades: Early Years – Grade 12
- Language: English
- Accreditations: International Baccalaureate; NEASC; CIS
- Website: http://www.dominics-int.org/

St. Dominic’s International School is IB countinuum International School for children ages 3 to 19, in Cascais, Portugal. For over 50 years, the school has been welcoming families in Lisbon with a holistic, international education. As one of the few schools in Portugal authorised to teach the full International Baccalaureate (IB) continuum – PYP, MYP and Diploma Programme – it offers a flexible, supportive environment where students from more than 50 nationalities learn, grow, and thrive as global citizens.

== History ==
St. Dominics International School is a school in São Domingos de Rana, Cascais, near Lisbon, in Portugal. It was founded by Irish Dominican Sisters, beginning as the Bom Sucesso Girls Day School in 1954. Transition to a co-educational school began in 1963. With the building of the bridge over the Tagus River, now called the 25 de Abril Bridge, the expanding English expatriate community asked the sisters to establish a new school. St Dominic's College, English language co-educational school was founded in the Bom Sucesso convent. The school started with fewer than 20 students but quickly needing more space. The new school opened on its present site in 1975. It was named St Dominic's International School in 1988.

== Administration ==
In 2010 St Dominic's was sold to Veritas Educatio/SA, whose owners are Catarina Formigo, Filipe Pinhal and Joaquim Marques dos Santos.

== Programme ==
The school offers the IB Diploma Programme at all three levels — Primary Years Programme (since December 1997), Middle Years Programme and the Diploma Programme (both since December 1994) — the only school in Portugal offering all three programs.

== Student body ==
It is an English-speaking school, with children of around 50 different nationalities.

=== Alumni ===
- Annabelle Wallis, English actress
