= Tires, Portugal =

Coordinates: 38°43′N 9°21′W

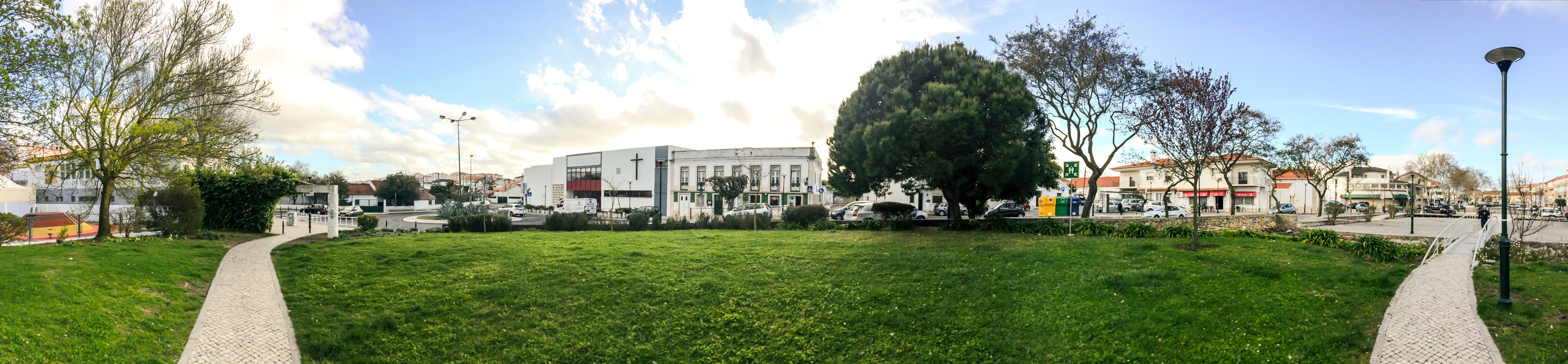
View of Tires

Tires is a Portuguese village located in the civil parish of São Domingos de Rana, in the coastal municipality of Cascais.

== History ==
The first known reference to the village of Tires is from 1527, called at the time Tyras, and had around 10 dwellings, where the main activity was the production of wheat. In the census of 1960, Tires had 1887 inhabitants.

On 17 April 2017 a Swiss-registered light airplane crashed near a Lidl supermarket located in the village. At least five people were killed, including the pilot.

== Places of interest ==
- Cascais Municipal Aerodrome - A domestic airport serving the municipality of Cascais.
- Municipal Library of S. Domingos de Rana - Opened in 2005 and is one of the cultural centers of Tires.
- São Domingos de Rana Sports Complex - Inaugurated on 25 April 1995; there is a pavilion, several football pitches, two tennis courts and a skating rink for practicing various sports.
- União Recreativa e Desportiva de Tires - Local football club.
- Frei Gonçalo de Azevedo Secondary School.
- Parish Church of Tires - Parish of Our Lady of Grace - Inaugurated in 1982 in replacement of the chapel with the same name, that given the increase in the number of believers, it was necessary to build a new church.
- Chapel of Our Lady of Grace - Currently used as a mortuary chapel, it was built between the end of the 16th century and the mid-eighteenth century (for its Baroque style), has in its name the blessings that the virgin would have granted to the fishermen of Cascais. The original name would be Our Lady of Grace, but it will have been simplified to the current name.
- Tires Prison - A female only prison.
