= Roman villa of Freiria =

Ancient Roman villa in Portugal

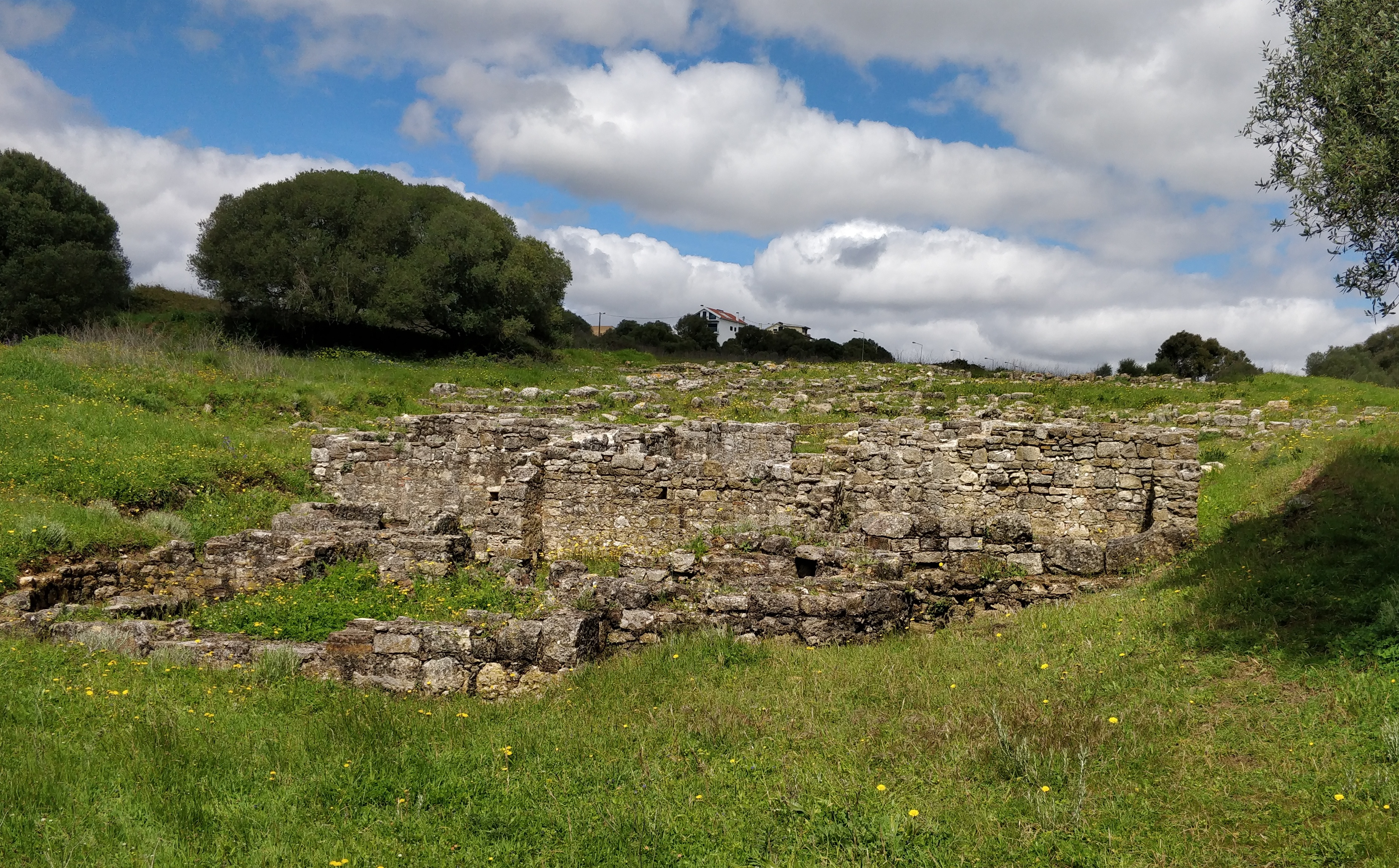
- Interactive map of Roman villa of Freiria
- 38°43′15.8″N 9°19′23.6″W
- Type: Ruins
- Location: Lisbon, Greater Lisbon, Lisbon, Portugal

Site notes
- Archaeologists: Guilherme Cardoso; José d'Encarnação
- Owner: Portuguese Republic
- Public access: Yes Saturdays and Sundays

The Roman villa of Freiria (Portuguese: Villa Romana de Freiria) is a Roman villa in the civil parish of São Domingos de Rana, in the Portuguese municipality of Cascais.

== History ==
The site of Freiria and its surrounding areas have long been inhabited due to access to water. A Palaeolithic site was identified 300 metres to the north of the villa and evidence of a Chalcolithic settlement was found 200 metres to the northeast. At Cabeço do Mouro, four hundred metres to the west, two late Bronze Age settlements have been identified. Evidence suggests that the Freiria area was occupied at the end of the 1st Iron Age and continued to be occupied when the end of the 2nd Iron Age briefly co-existed with Roman occupation. Radiocarbon dating has identified items dating back to the second half of the 10th century BCE. While many of the items found on the site from the Iron Age were clearly imported into the area, towards the end of the period there was a gradual increase in the presence of locally made ceramics. The Roman occupation of Freiria occurred after its occupation during the Iron Age. Many of the most recent objects found at the site that are attributable to the Iron Age were found together with the oldest Roman items.

Freiria gained importance in the 1st century CE, with an increase in new construction and renovation. This lasted until the 5th century, when the area began to decline. The villa was constructed in the 2nd century. Virgílio Correia was the first to identify Roman vestiges in the area, when he discovered a Roman tombstone near the local quarries in 1912. The first archaeological excavations occurred on site in 1973, by Guilherme Cardoso and José d'Encarnação. Further work was carried out between 1985 and 2002 by the same archaeologists, with the site having been identified as a Roman villa in 1985.

In 1985, excavations unearthed a domus, granary and thermae. Further excavations starting on 13 July 1987, financed by the Portuguese Institute for Architectural Heritage (Instituto Português do Património Arquitetónico), with logistical support from the municipal council and tourism bureau, resulted in the definition of a special zone of the villa fructuária.

The discovery of numerous bell-shaped ceramic fragments document the occupation of this area to a proto-historic phase of settlement. Among these were: the inferior section of a windmill, a dog-shaped gargoyle with barred teeth, needles and bone pins; iron alloys; bronze needle and a ceramic mold with the decoration of a lion. There are also in southern area of the villa additional 2 metres (6.6 ft) stratigraphic layers of further potential archaeological interest.

== Architecture ==
The site is situated in a rural area surrounded by agricultural lands.

It is constituted by a "villa", with the "domus", of which a few floors have been found in the northeast corner of the peristyle (with a covered patio set on columns, around a garden) with a marble column base and fallen capital, and an "impluvium" (square opening in the middle of the atrium that collected rainwater). In the thermae is a water tank, with stones detected suggesting a possible buttress supporting the wall of the tank, possibly being a "natatio" that would simultaneously serve the northern thermal complex and the needs of the villa fructuária.

The surrounding agricultural area includes rural structures such as a barn and winery. The granary, notable for its size and solid construction, has buttresses distributed along the northern and eastern foundation corridors, indicating a walled courtyard that used natural slab flooring. Also along the southern edge was an area expressly designed for an earth oven to bake bread and an altar in honor of Triborunis (an indigenous divinity).
