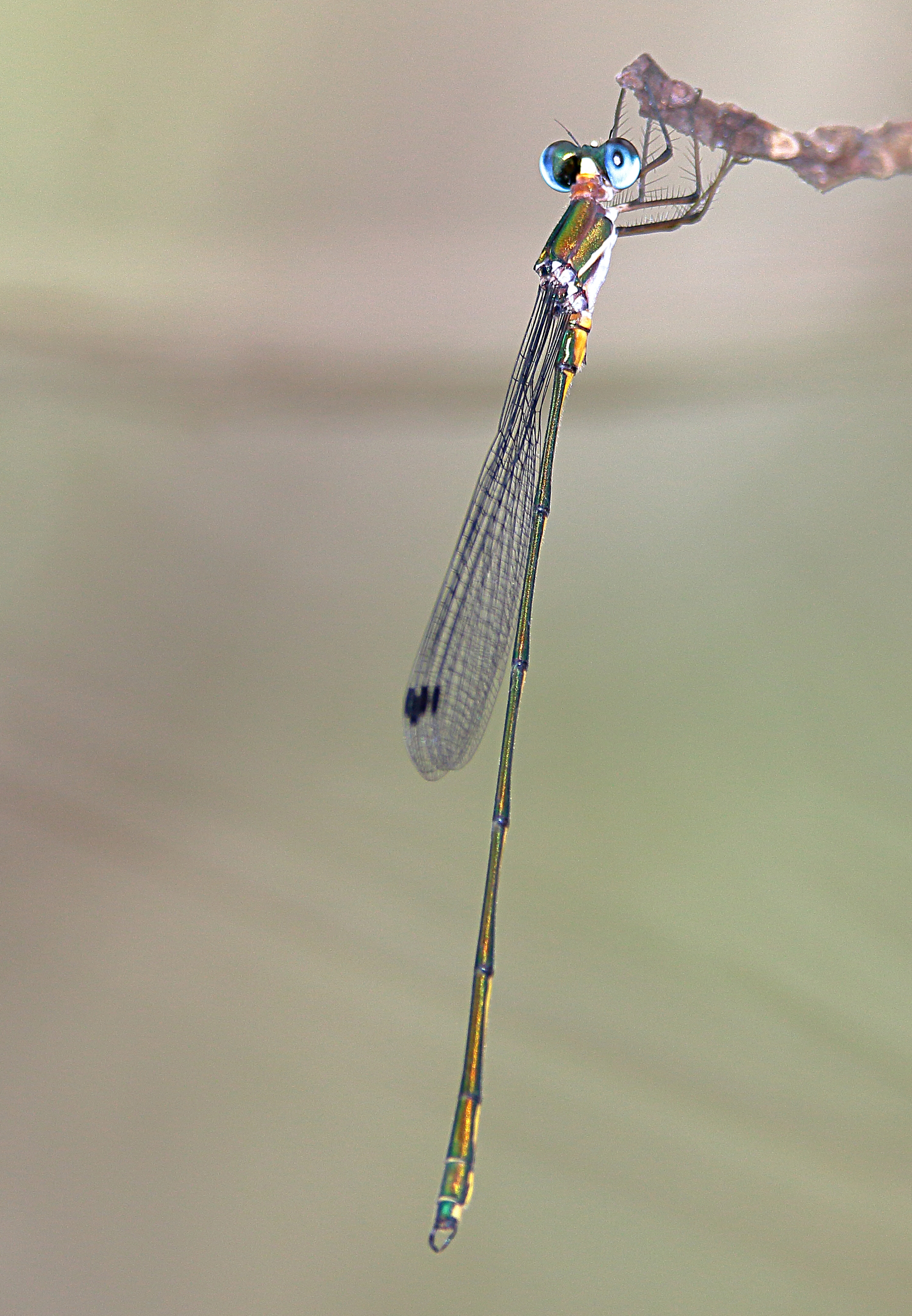
- Male at Davies Creek, north Queensland

Conservation status
- Least Concern (IUCN 3.1)

Scientific classification
- Kingdom: Animalia
- Phylum: Arthropoda
- Clade: Pancrustacea
- Class: Insecta
- Order: Odonata
- Suborder: Zygoptera
- Family: Synlestidae
- Genus: Synlestes
- Species: S. tropicus

Binomial name
- Synlestes tropicus Tillyard, 1917

= Synlestes tropicus =

Tropical needle

Species of damselfly

Synlestes tropicus is a species of Australian damselfly in the family Synlestidae, commonly known as a tropical needle. It is endemic to north-eastern Queensland, where it inhabits streams in rainforests.

Synlestes tropicus is a large to very large damselfly, coloured a metallic green-black with pale markings. It perches with its wings partially or fully outspread.

== Etymology ==
The genus name Synlestes is derived from the Greek σύν (syn, "together"), combined with Lestes, a genus name derived from the Greek λῃστής (lēstēs, "robber").

The species name tropicus is derived from the Greek τροπικός (tropikos, "tropical"), referring to its habitat in tropical northern Queensland.

== Gallery ==
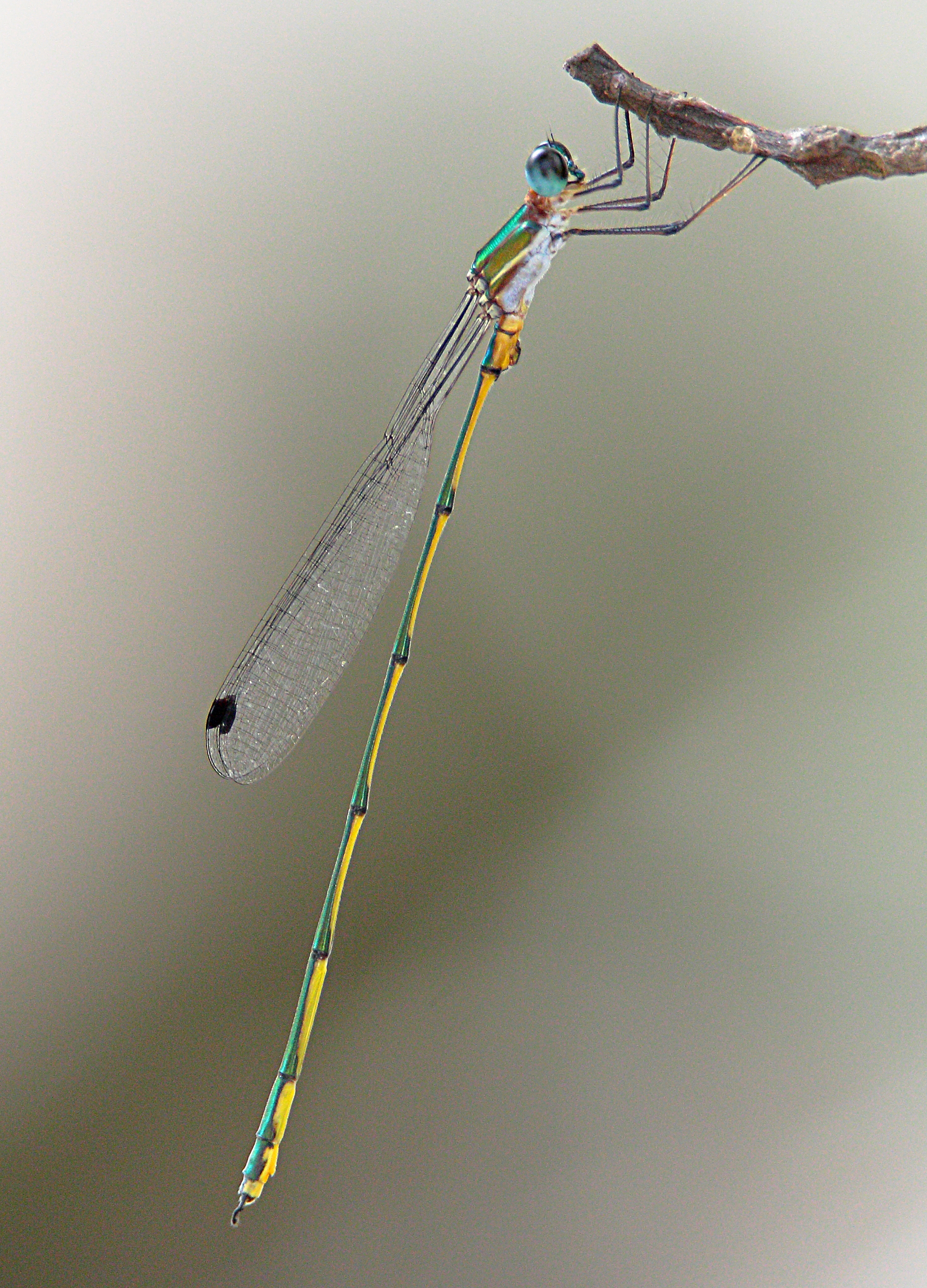
Male, Davies Creek NP, Qld

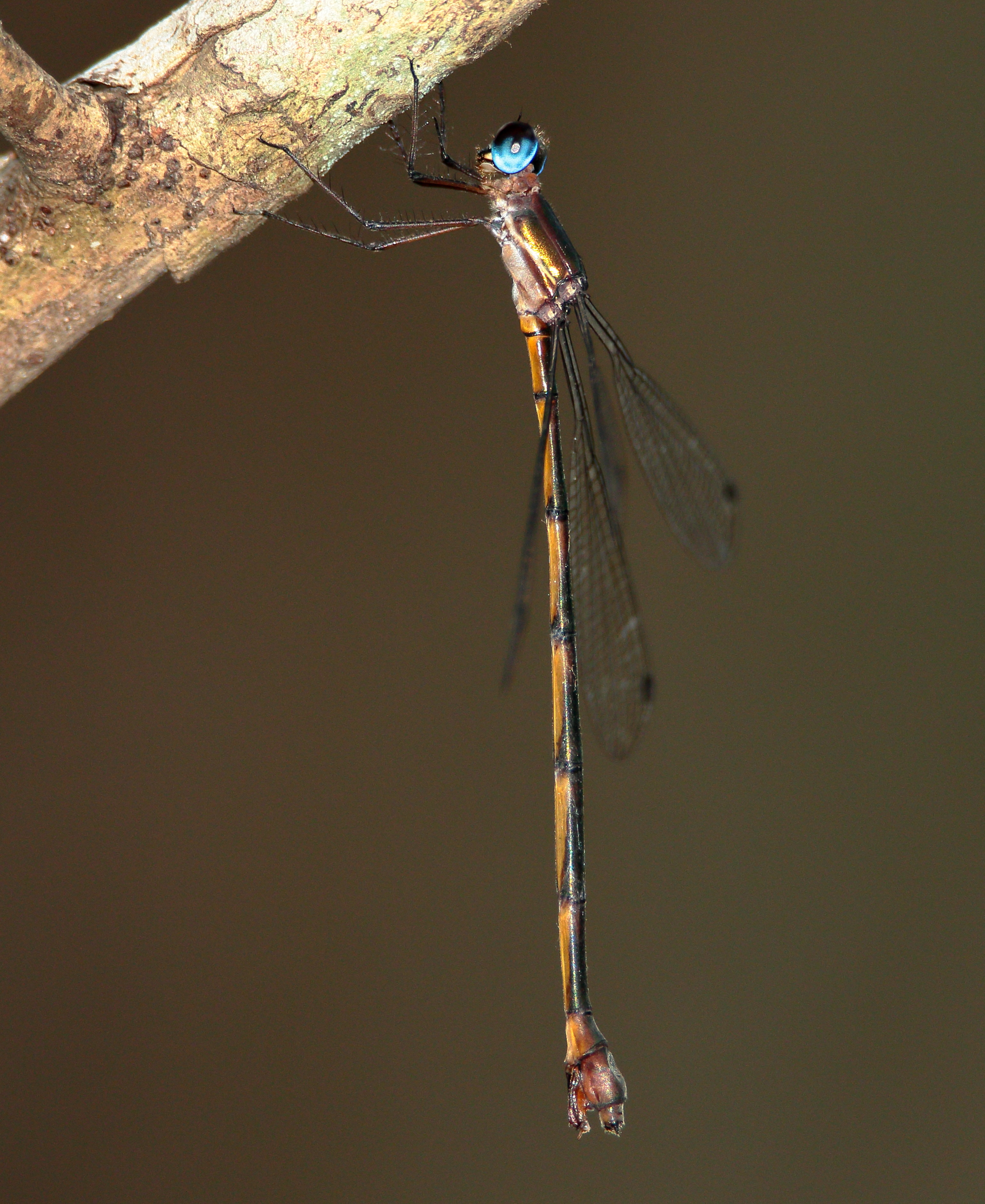
Female, Davies Creek NP, Qld

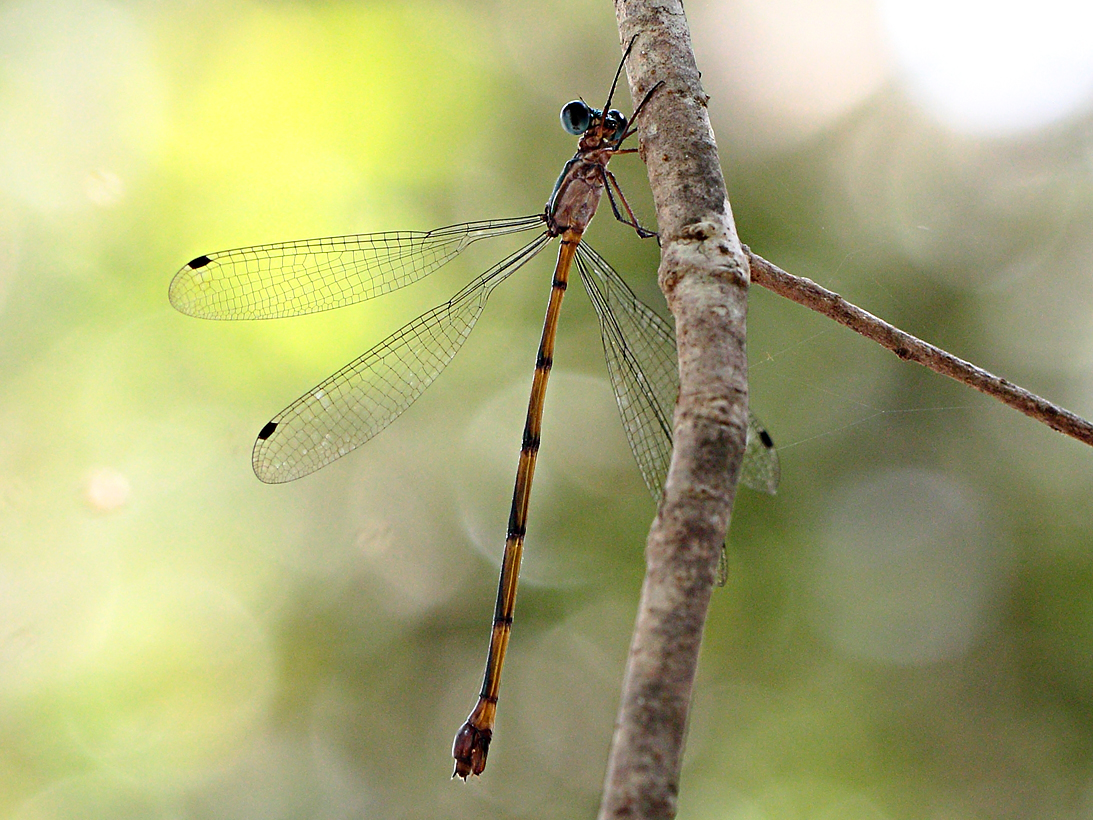
Female, view from below

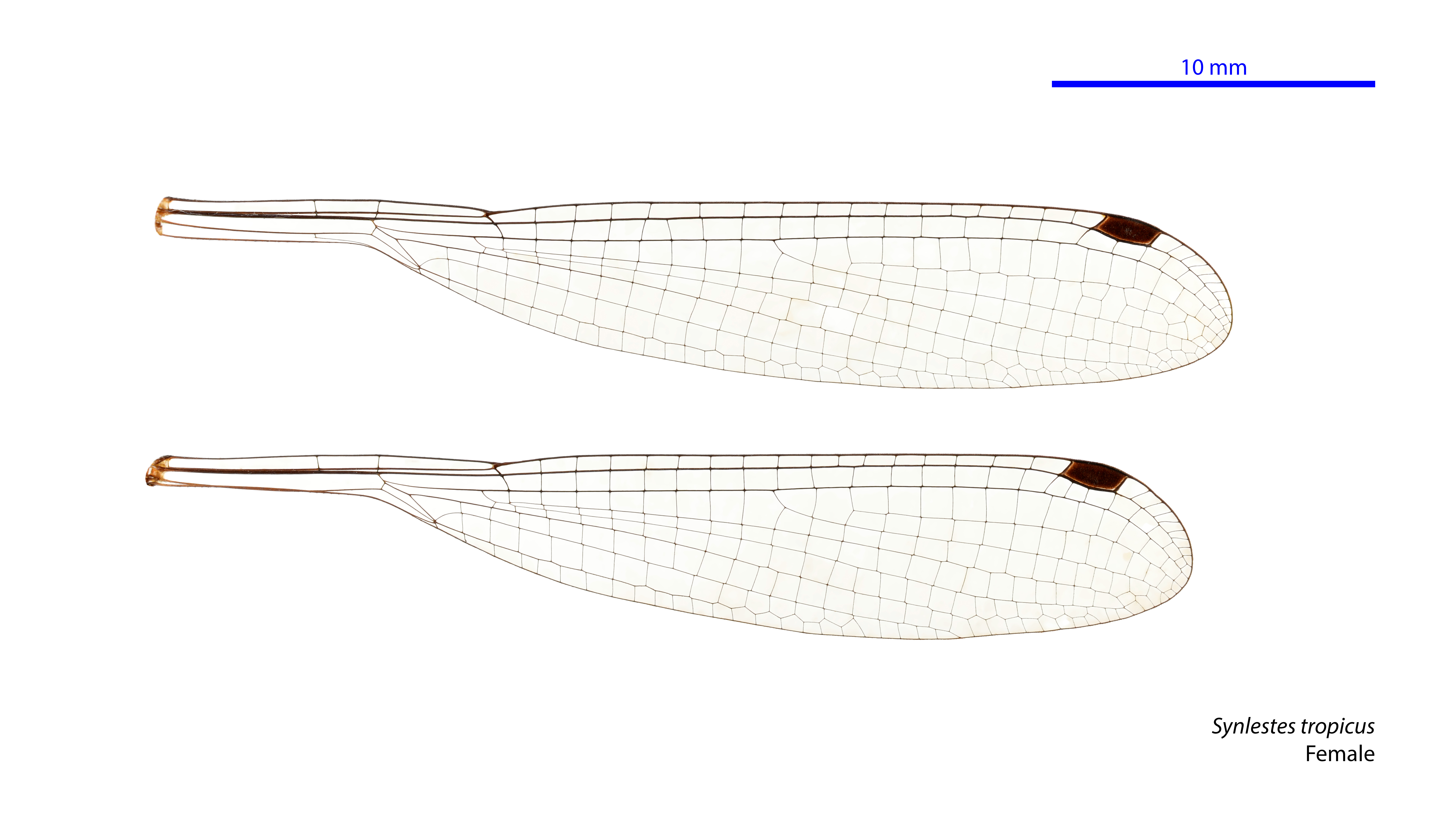
Female wings

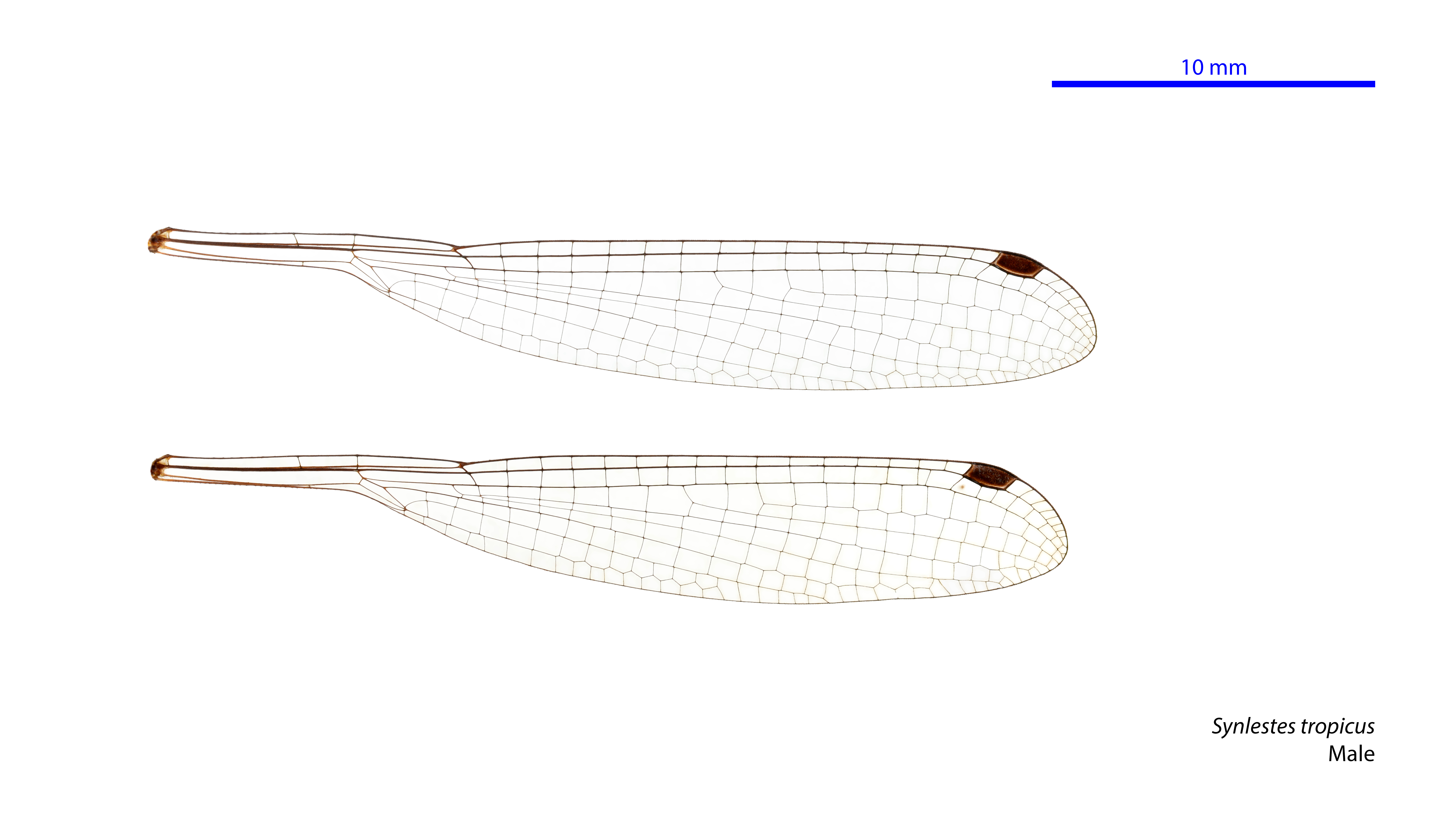
Male wings

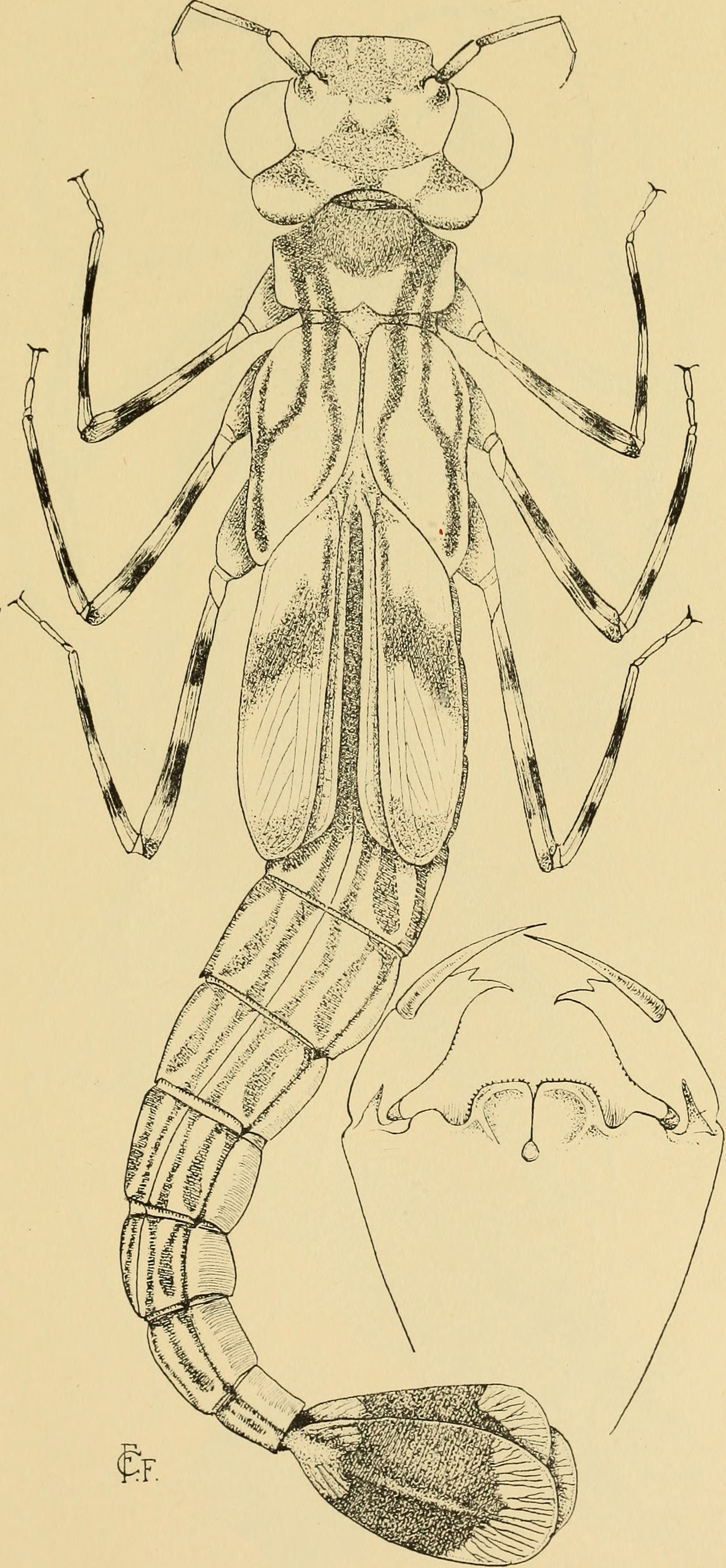
Nymph of Synlestes tropicus

== See also ==
- List of Odonata species of Australia
