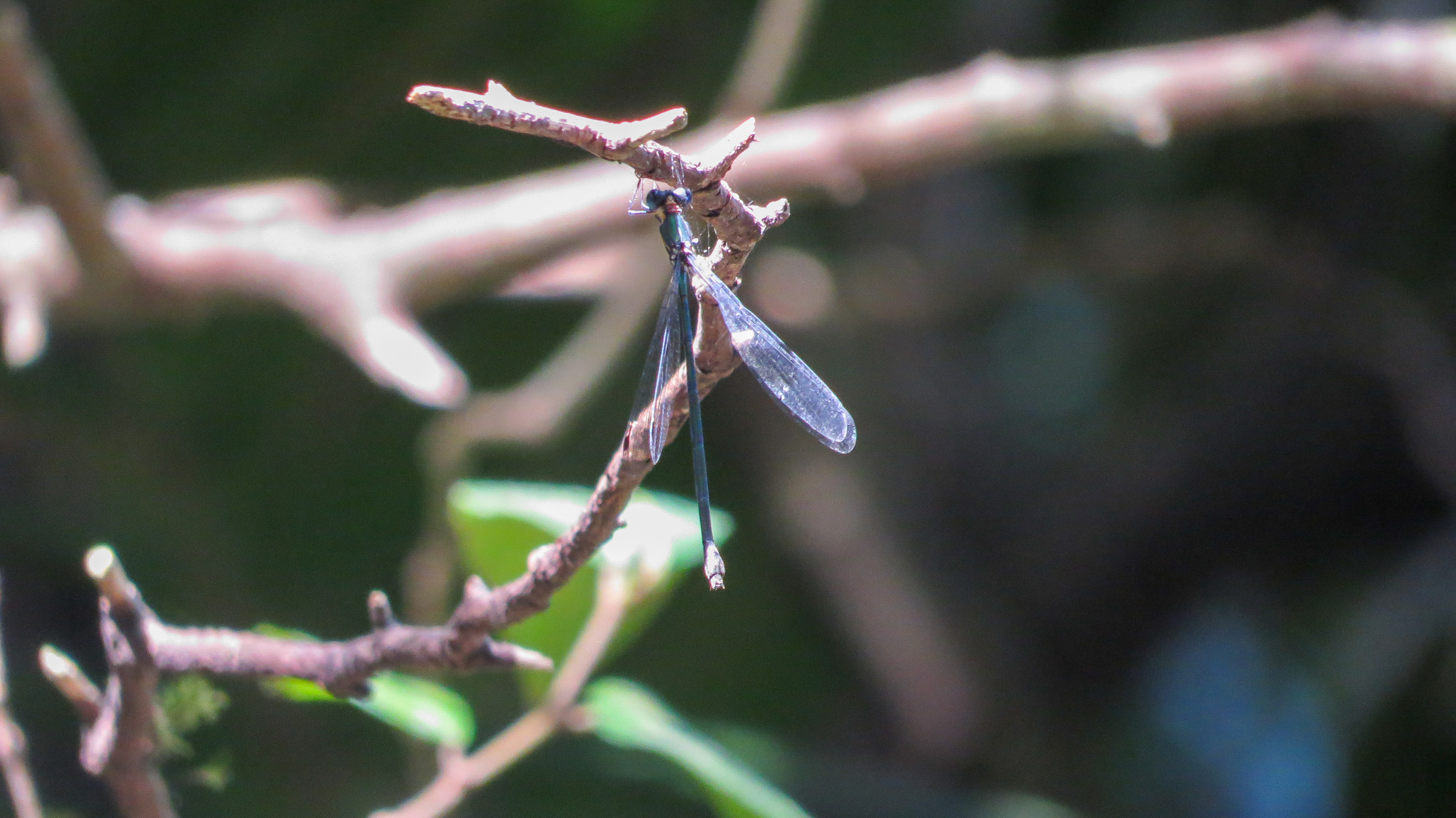
- Female
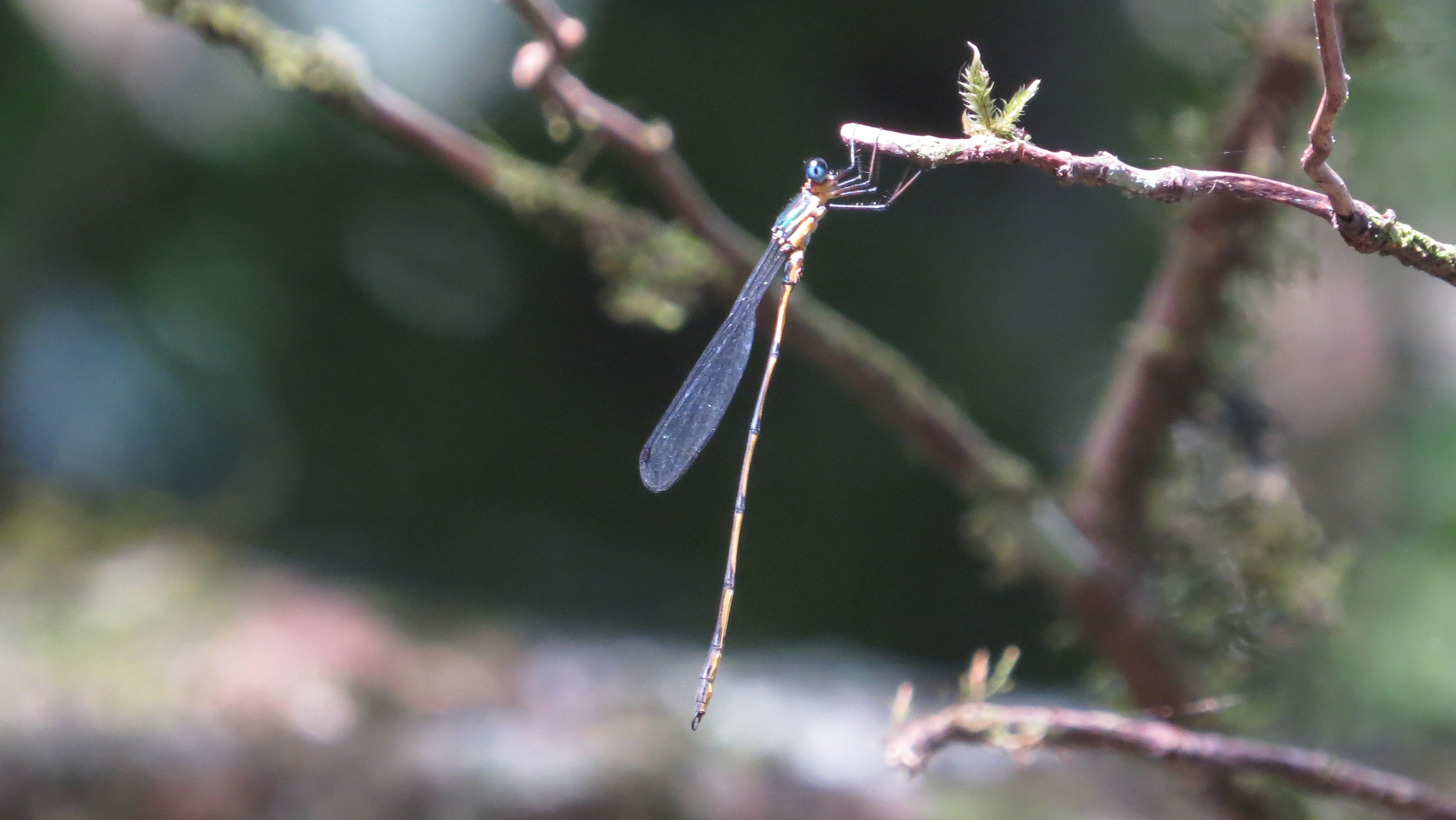
- Male

Conservation status
- Least Concern (IUCN 3.1)

Scientific classification
- Kingdom: Animalia
- Phylum: Arthropoda
- Clade: Pancrustacea
- Class: Insecta
- Order: Odonata
- Suborder: Zygoptera
- Family: Synlestidae
- Genus: Synlestes
- Species: S. selysi

Binomial name
- Synlestes selysi Tillyard, 1917

= Synlestes selysi =

Forest needle

Species of damselfly

Synlestes selysi is a species of Australian damselfly in the family Synlestidae, commonly known as a forest needle. It is endemic to eastern New South Wales and eastern Queensland, where it inhabits streams.

Synlestes selysi is a large to very large damselfly, coloured a metallic green-black with pale markings. It perches with its wings partially or fully outspread.

== Etymology ==
The genus name Synlestes is derived from the Greek σύν (syn, "together"), combined with Lestes, a genus name derived from the Greek λῃστής (lēstēs, "robber").

In 1917, Robin Tillyard named this species selysi, an eponym honouring Michel Edmond de Sélys Longchamps (1813–1900), a Belgian scientist widely regarded as the leading authority on dragonflies and damselflies.

== Gallery ==
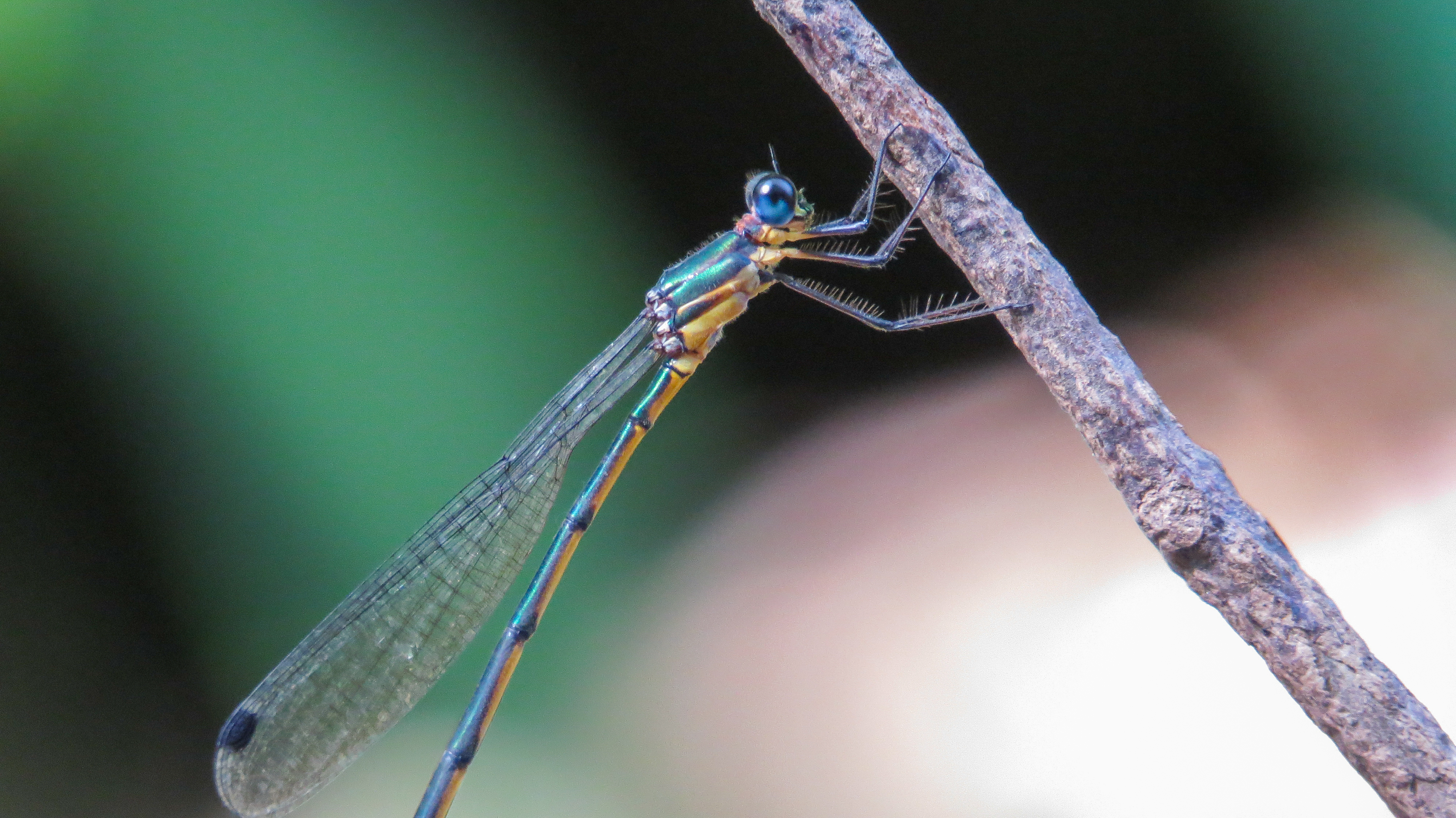
Female

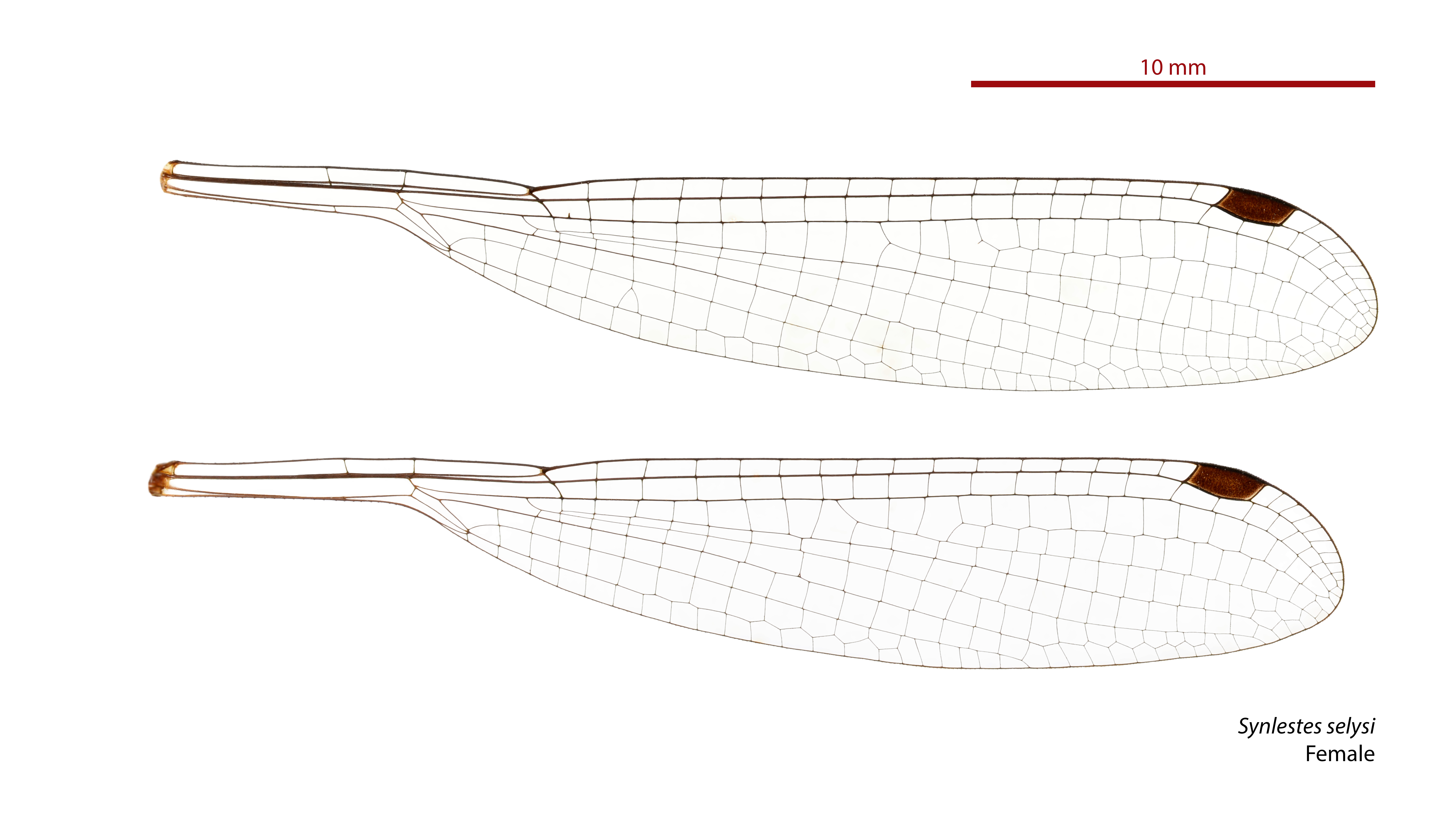
Female wings

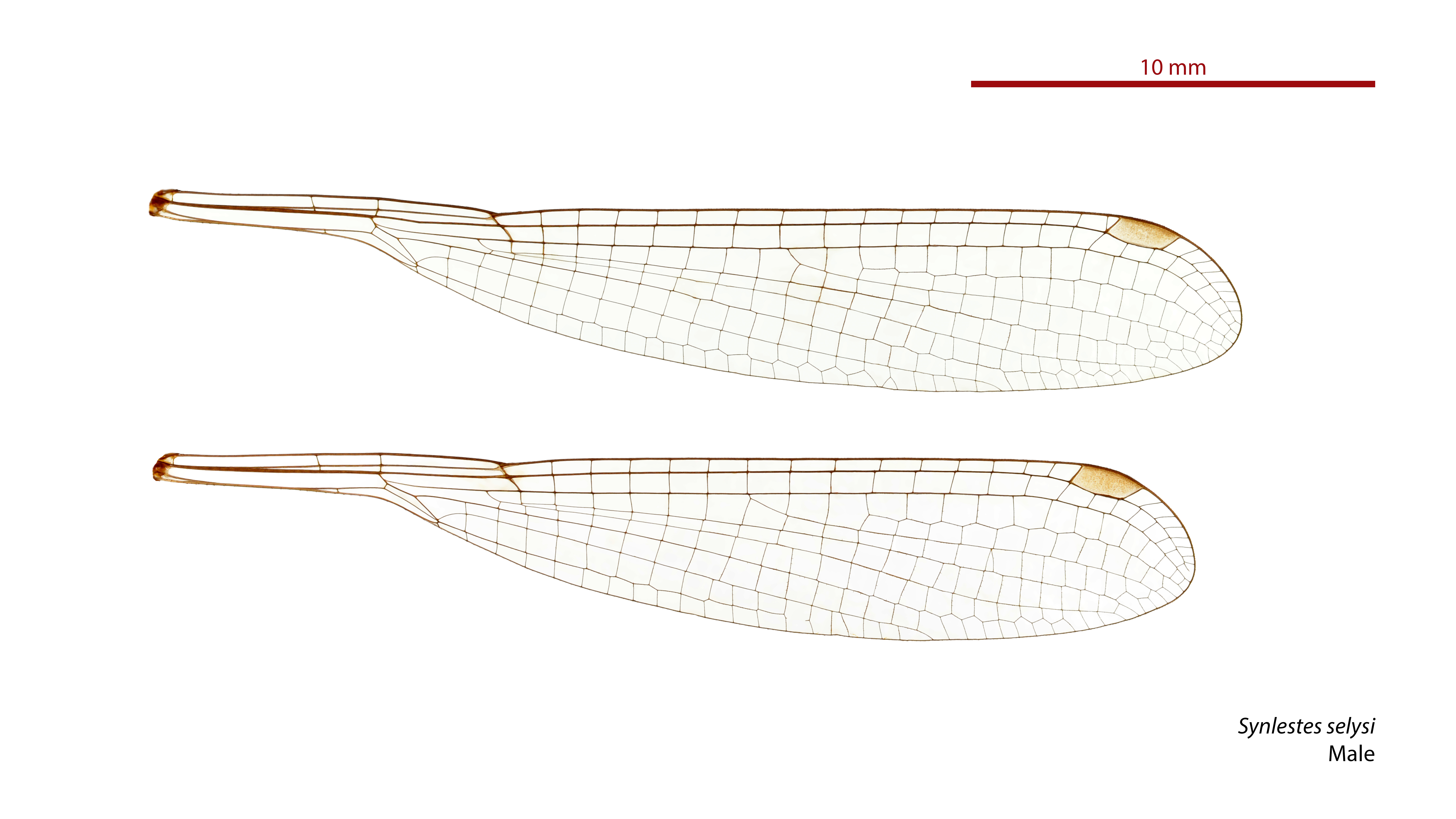
Male wings

== See also ==
- List of Odonata species of Australia
