= URD Tires =

Portuguese football club

- Full name: União Recreativa e Desportiva de Tires
- Founded: 8 December 1962; 63 years ago
- Ground: Parque Dr. A. F. Santos Neves; Tires
- Capacity: 2,000
- League: Pró-Nacional AF Lisboa
- 2019–20: Pró-Nacional AF Lisboa, 10th
- Website: www.urdtires.pt

União Recreativa e Desportiva de Tires is a Portuguese football club located in Tires, Portugal.

== Colours and badge ==
Tires' colours are green and white.
