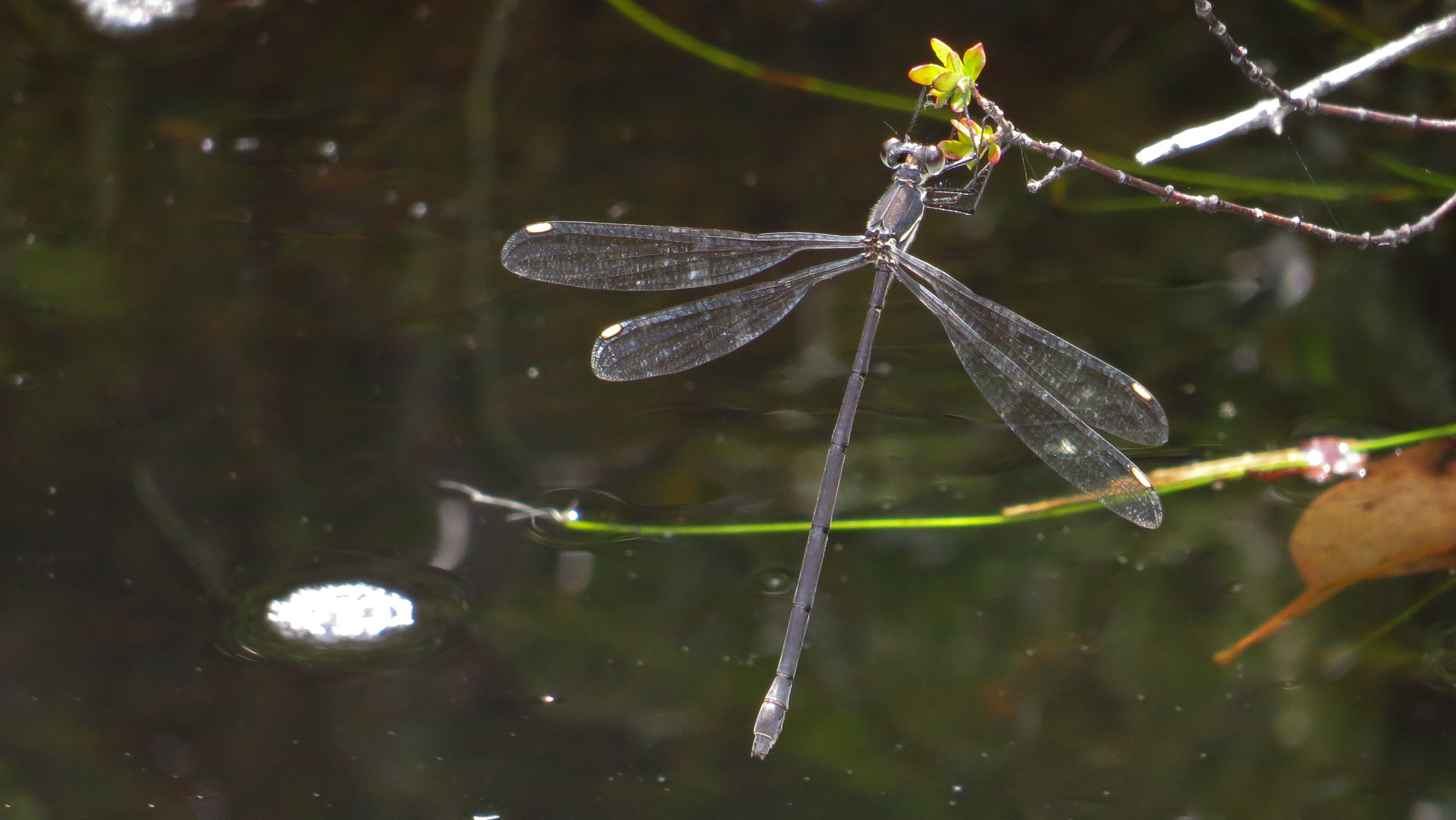
- Female Synlestes weyersii

Scientific classification
- Kingdom: Animalia
- Phylum: Arthropoda
- Clade: Pancrustacea
- Class: Insecta
- Order: Odonata
- Suborder: Zygoptera
- Family: Synlestidae
- Genus: Synlestes; Selys, 1869

= Synlestes =

Genus of damselflies

Synlestes is a genus of damselflies in the family Synlestidae. Species of Synlestes are large damselflies, metallic green to dark bronze or black in colour with white, yellow or orange markings. Unlike many other damselflies, they often rest with their wings partly or fully spread. The genus is endemic to eastern Australia, where its species inhabit streams and rivers, particularly in forested habitats.

== Species ==
The genus Synlestes includes the following species:

- Synlestes selysi Tillyard, 1917 - forest needle
- Synlestes tropicus Tillyard, 1917 - tropical needle
- Synlestes weyersii Selys, 1868 - bronze needle

== Etymology ==
The genus name Synlestes is derived from the Greek σύν (syn, "together"), combined with Lestes, a genus name derived from the Greek λῃστής (lēstēs, "robber"), indicating resemblance to that genus.
