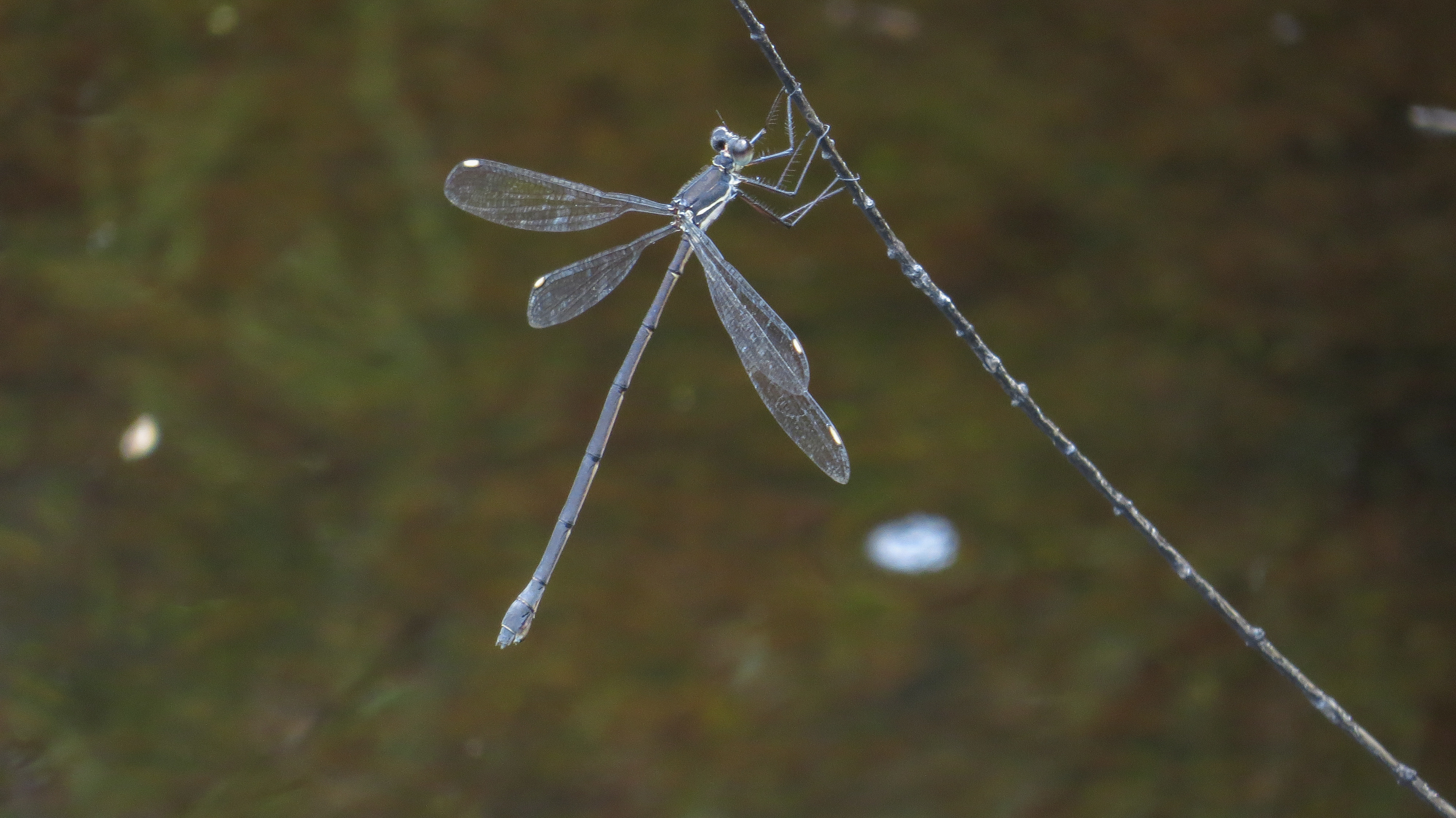
- Female
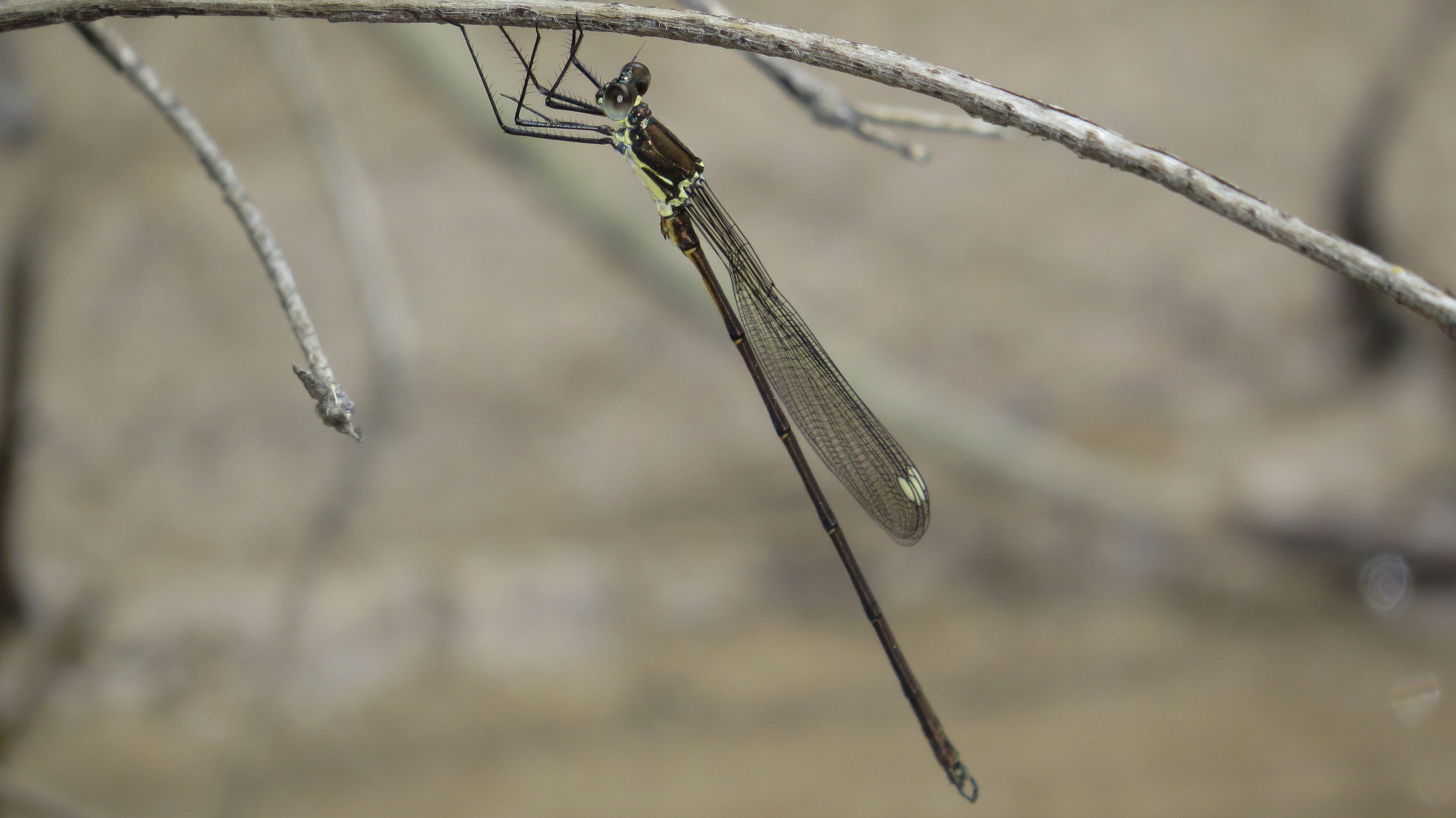
- Male

Conservation status
- Least Concern (IUCN 3.1)

Scientific classification
- Kingdom: Animalia
- Phylum: Arthropoda
- Clade: Pancrustacea
- Class: Insecta
- Order: Odonata
- Suborder: Zygoptera
- Family: Synlestidae
- Genus: Synlestes
- Species: S. weyersii

Binomial name
- Synlestes weyersii Selys, 1869

Synonyms
- Synlestes nigrescens Tillyard, 1917; Synlestes tillyardi Fraser, 1948

= Synlestes weyersii =

Bronze needle

Species of damselfly

Synlestes weyersii is a species of Australian damselfly in the family Synlestidae, commonly known as a bronze needle. It is endemic to south-eastern Australia, where it inhabits streams and rivers.

Synlestes weyersii is a large to very large damselfly, coloured a metallic bronze-black to green-black with yellow markings. It perches with its wings partially or fully outspread.

== Etymology ==
The genus name Synlestes is derived from the Greek σύν (syn, "together"), combined with Lestes, a genus name derived from the Greek λῃστής (lēstēs, "robber").

In 1869, Edmond de Sélys Longchamps named this species weyersii, an eponym honouring Joseph Léopold de Weyers, Secretary and Librarian of La Société Entomologique de Belgique, for his services to entomology.

== Gallery ==
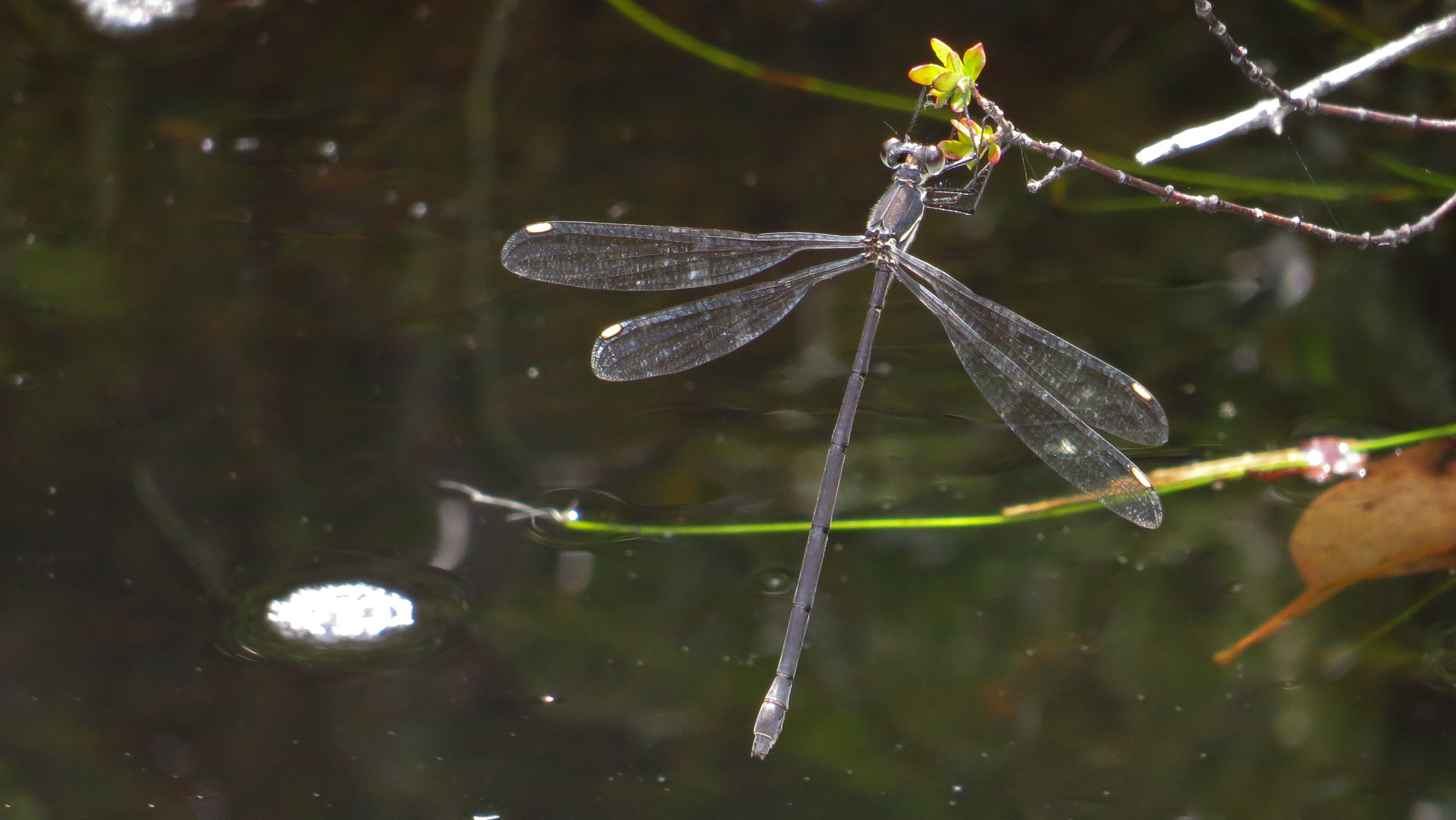
Female

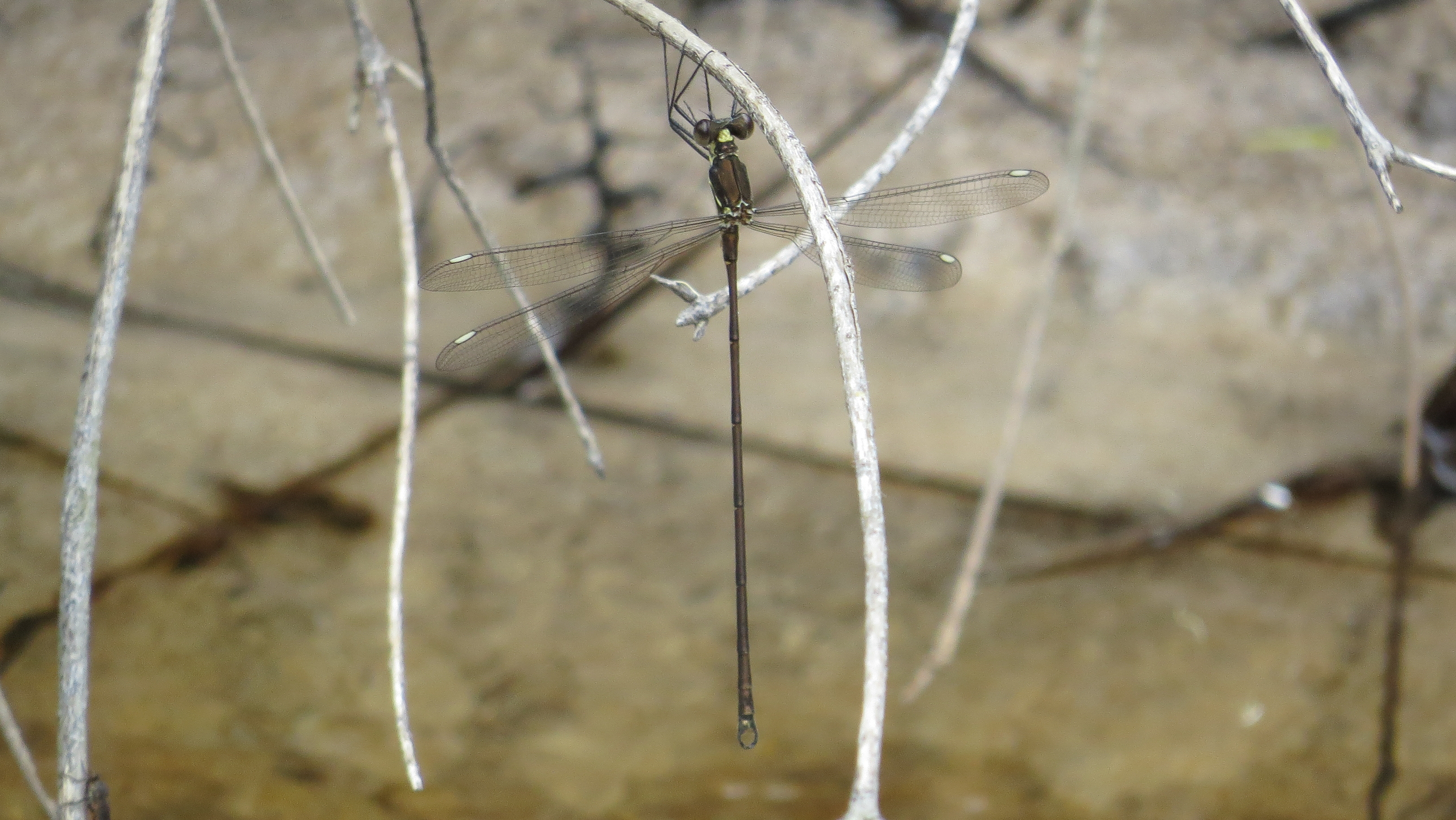
Male

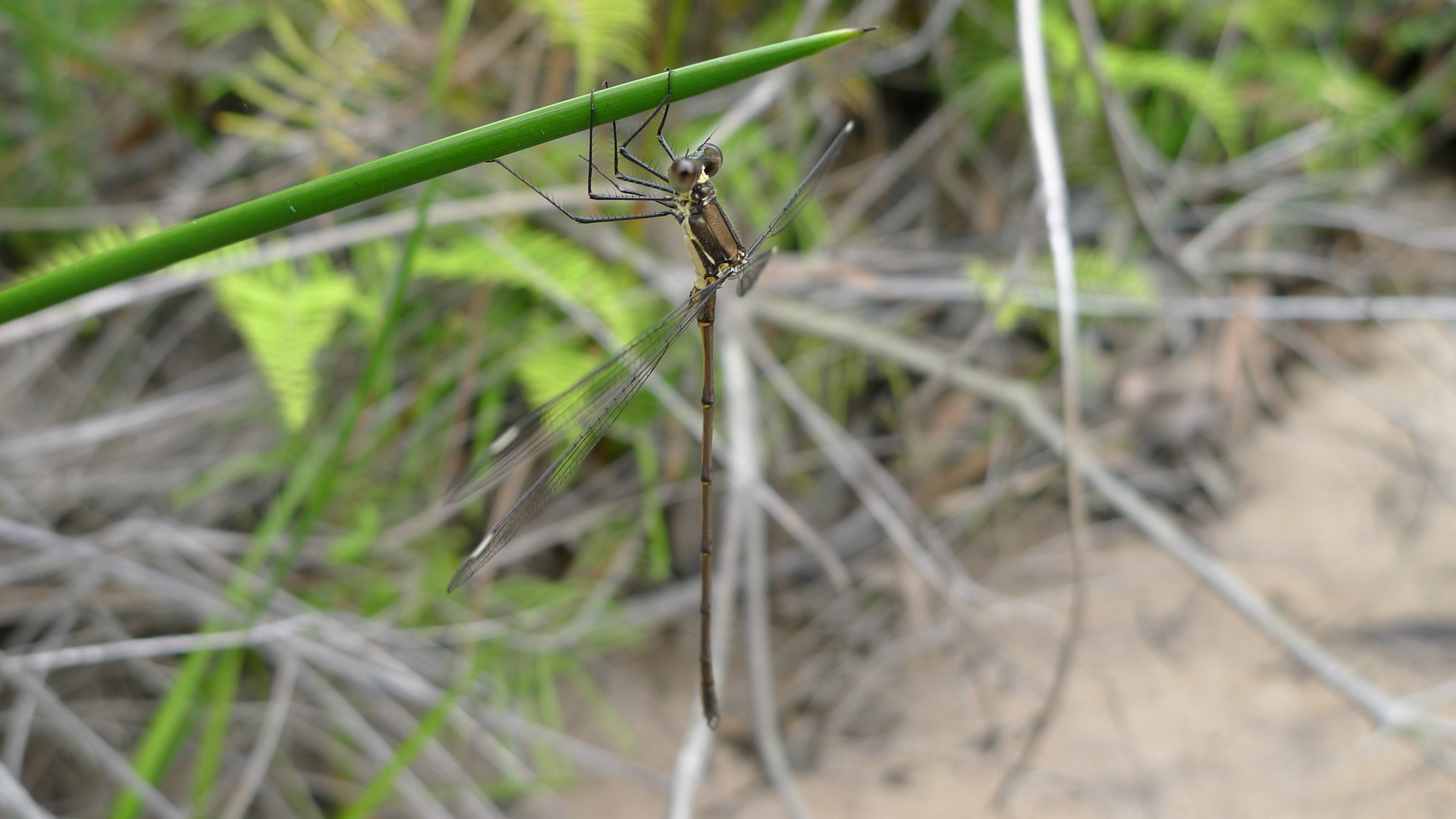
Male body

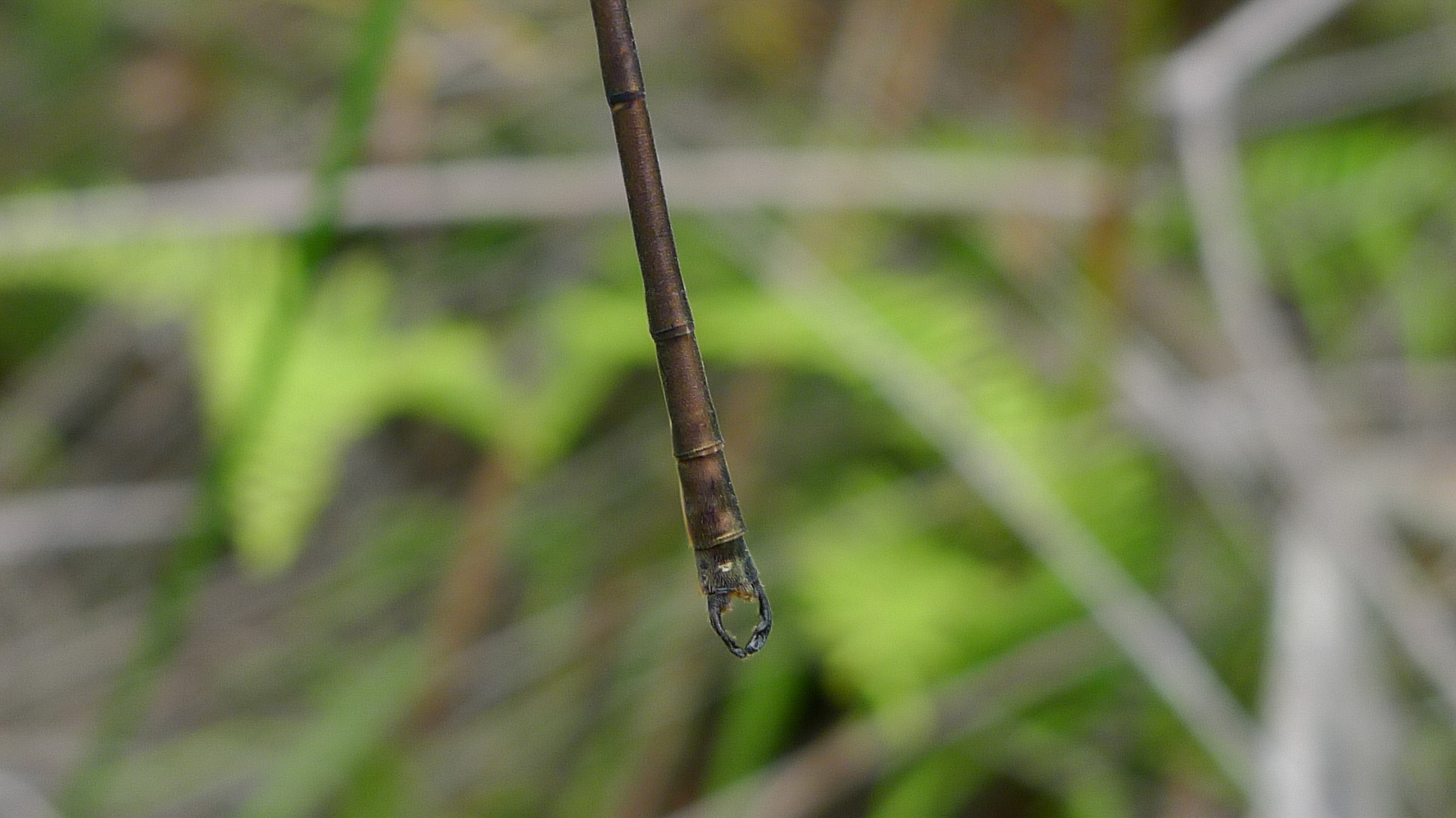
Tip of male tail

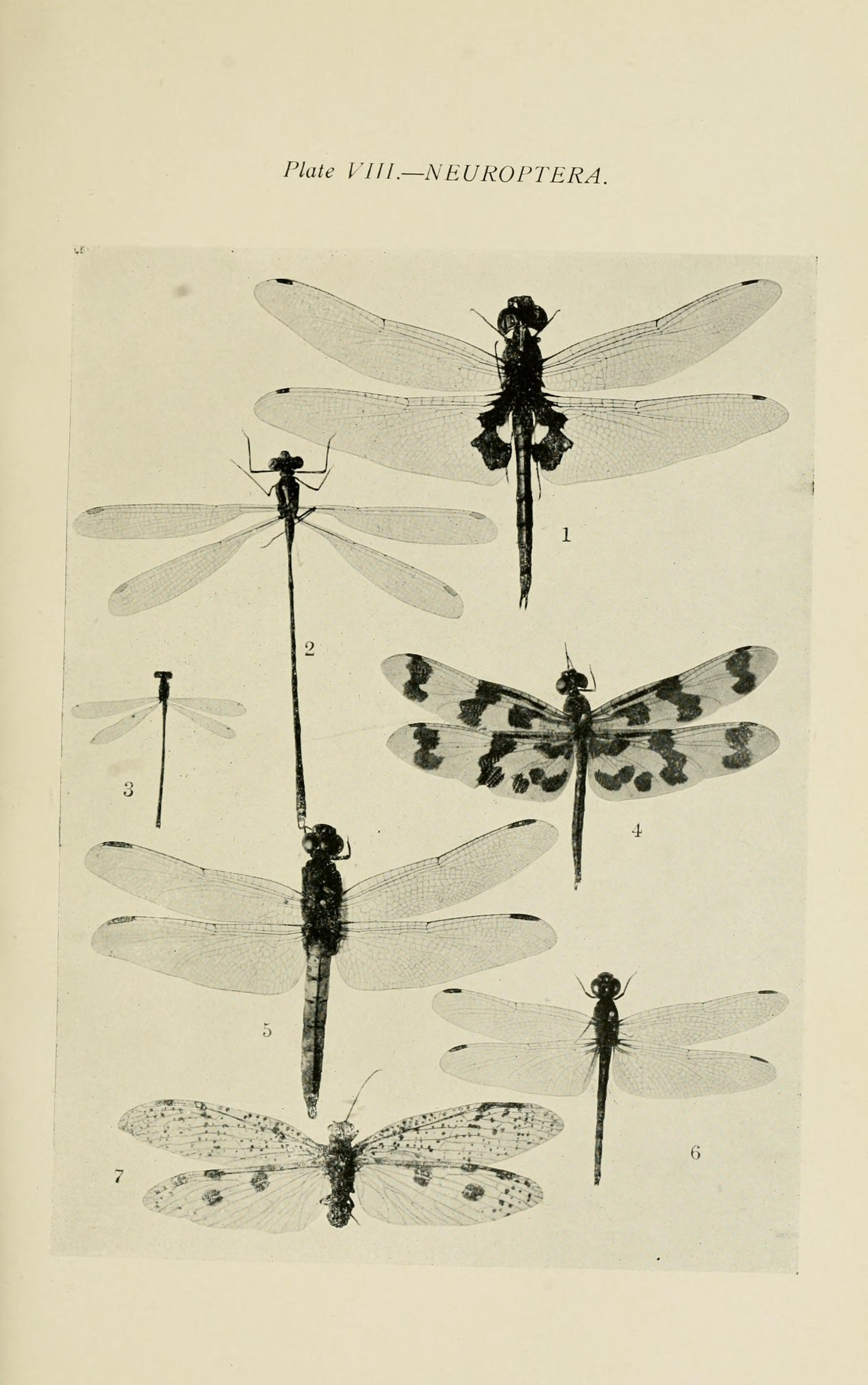
Image 2, Synlestes weyersii 1907

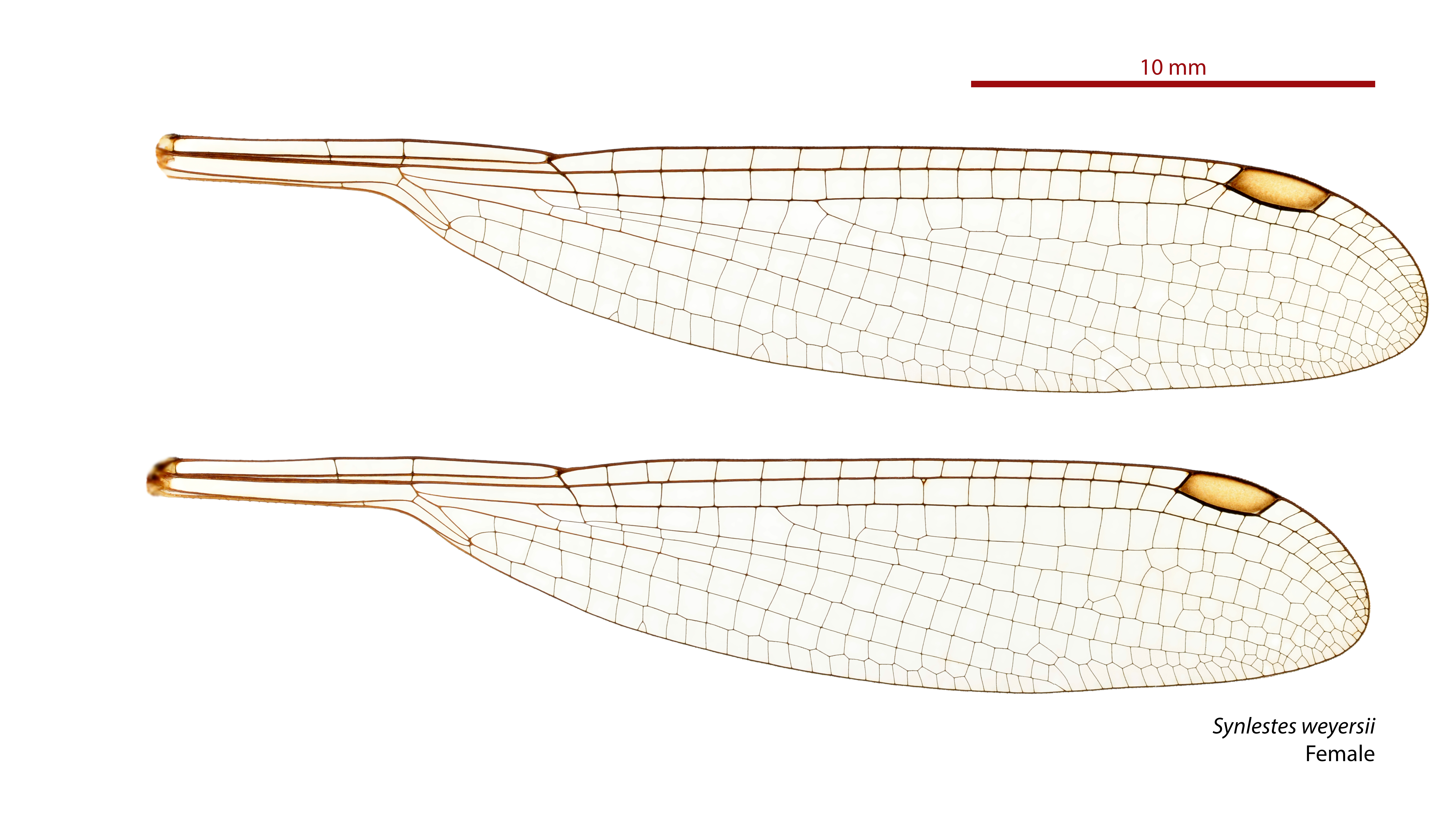
Female wings

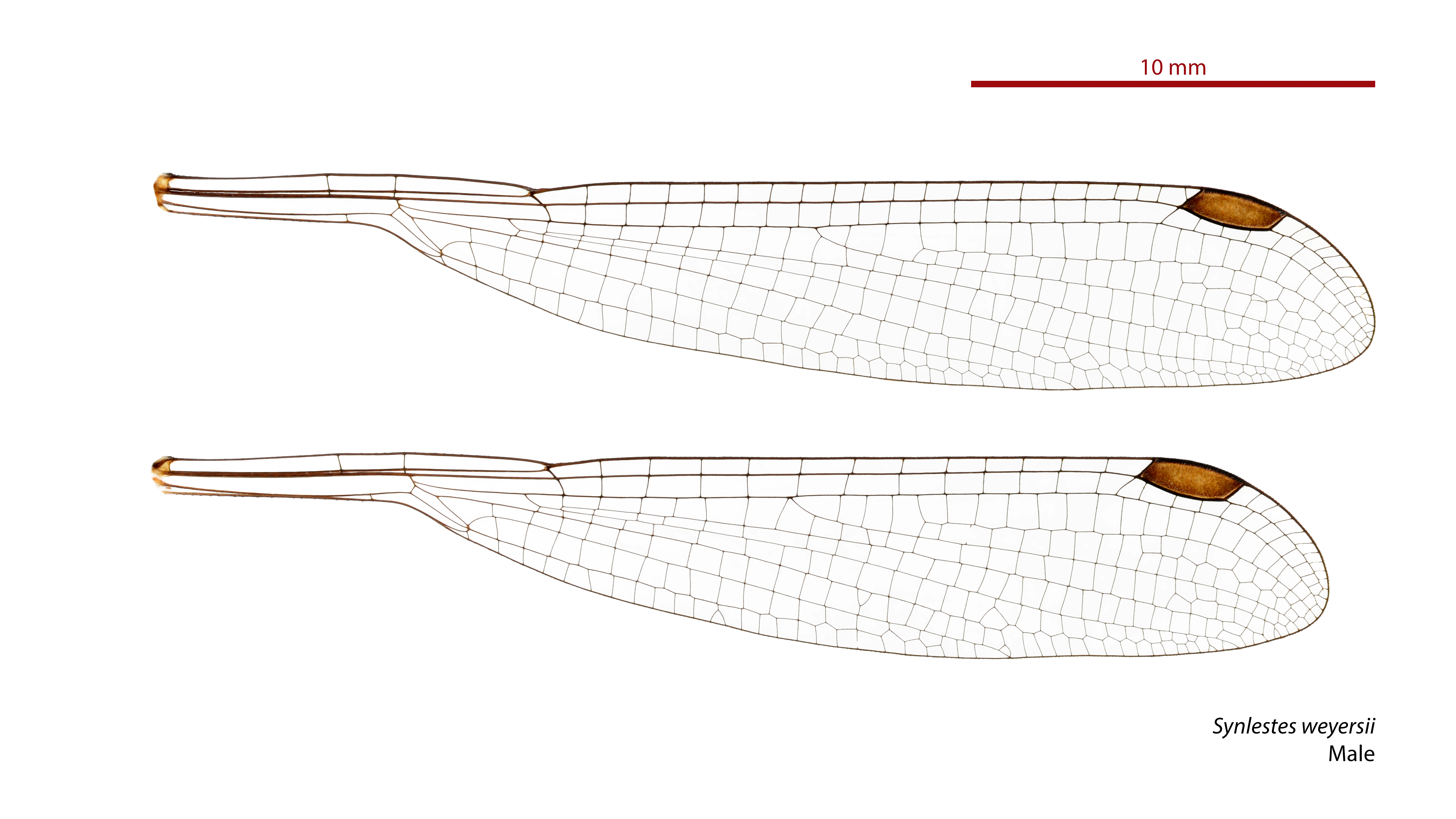
Male wings

== See also ==
- List of Odonata species of Australia
