= Virgílio Correia =

Portuguese archaeologist and art historian (1888–1944)

- Born: Virgílio Correia Pinto da Fonseca; 18 October 1888; Peso da Régua, Portugal
- Died: 3 June 1944 (aged 55); Coimbra, Portugal
- Other name: Vergílio Correia Pinto da Fonseca
- Occupations: University professor, art historian, archaeologist, anthropologist, ethnographer, museum director
- Years active: 35
- Known for: Archaeological excavations; museum management; publications on art history
- Notable work: Excavations at Conímbriga Roman settlement

Virgílio (or Vergílio) Correia Pinto da Fonseca (1888 –1944) was a Portuguese university professor, art historian, archaeologist, anthropologist, ethnographer, museum director, conservationist, amateur photographer, and journalist. Playing an active role in the excavations at the Conímbriga Roman settlement near Coimbra, he was also director of the Machado de Castro National Museum in Coimbra, achieving widespread recognition among his contemporaries.

== Early life ==
Correia was born in Peso da Régua in the Vila Real District of Portugal on 18 October 1888. He graduated in law from the Faculty of Law of the University of Coimbra in 1911, having studied law as the result of parental pressure. Following a brief spell as a notary, a year later he became the curator of the National Museum of Ethnology in Lisbon after a competitive examination. He held that position until 1916, working closely with the museum's founder and director, the ethnologist, José Leite de Vasconcelos. From 1916 to 1921 Correia was curator of the National Museum of Ancient Art in Lisbon, again after a competitive exam, before taking up a teaching position at the University of Coimbra. He published Lisboa Préistorica (Prehistoric Lisbon) in 1912 and, from an early age, was involved with archaeological excavations, having identified the Roman villa of Freiria in Cascais municipality in 1912 and studied Megalithic sites in the Évora District from 1914. He published a book on the Neolithic sites of Pavia in the Mora municipality in 1921, which was considered a fundamental piece for understanding Megalithism.

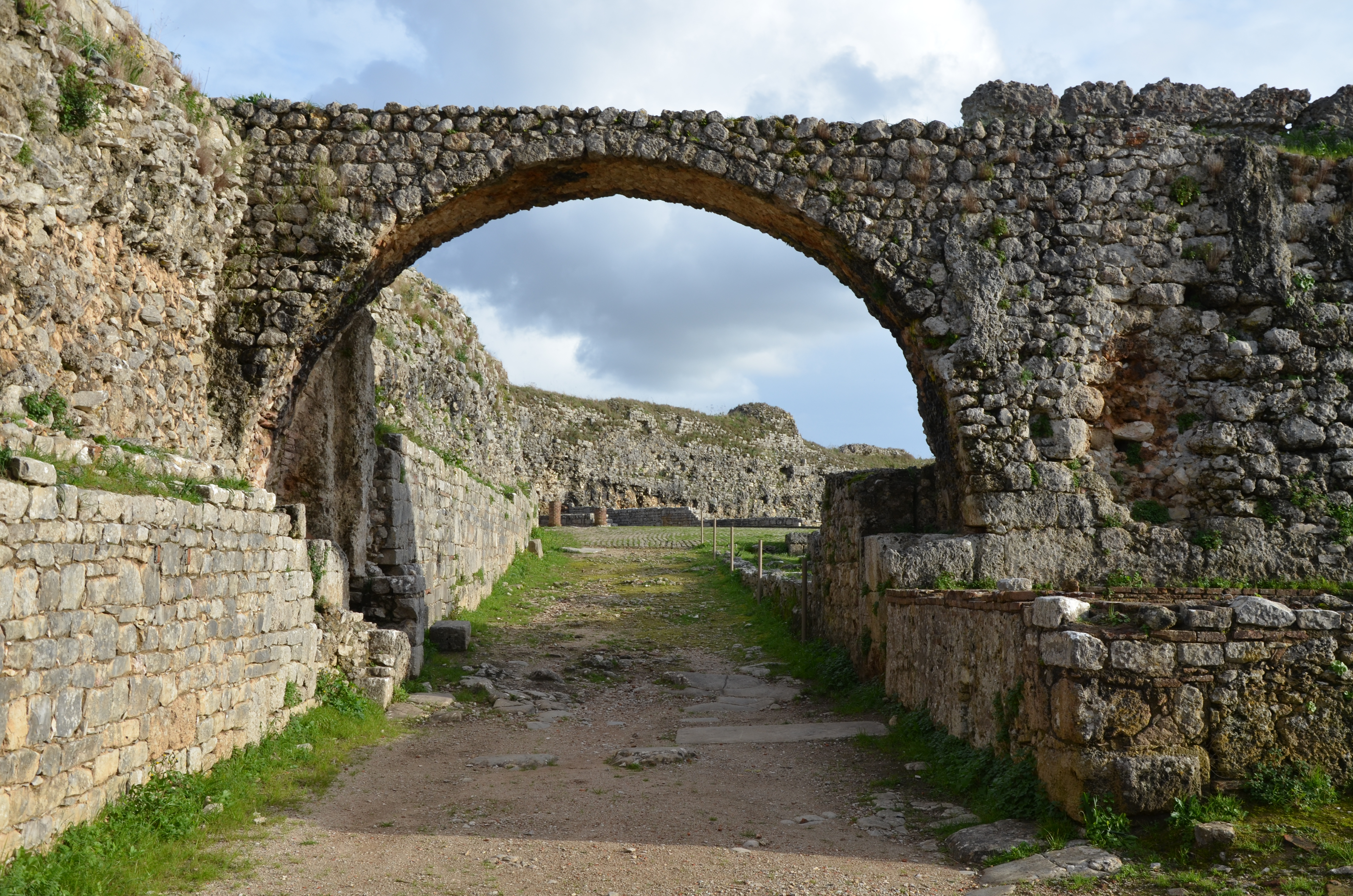
A view of the Conímbriga Roman settlement

== Career ==
Largely self-taught, at the Faculty of Arts of Coimbra University he initially taught aesthetics and art history and, from 1923, archaeology. In 1930 he began to teach history of the Ancient Orient and history of Classical Antiquity. He was to receive an honorary doctorate from the faculty in 1935. In 1933, he became director of the Machado de Castro National Museum in Coimbra, an art museum named after the Portuguese sculptor, Joaquim Machado de Castro. During his time in charge, he implemented a significant restructuring of the museum. He was also responsible for compiling an inventory of art in the Coimbra District and supervising the national art inventory, which was published posthumously as the multi-volume Artistic Inventory of Portugal. He contributed to the archaeological excavations of the Conímbriga Roman settlement near Coimbra, between 1930 and his death in 1944, and also carried out research in Italy and Morocco.

Between 1915 and 1920 Correia contributed to the journal Atlântida. He founded the magazine Terra and directed it between 1916 and 1927. This was an illustrated journal of artistic archaeology and ethnography. Between 1930 and 1933, he was responsible for the journal Arte e Arqueologia, in collaboration with the art historian, António Nogueira Gonçalves. Between 1938 and 1944 he edited the daily Diário de Coimbra, in which he increased coverage of Portuguese ethnography.

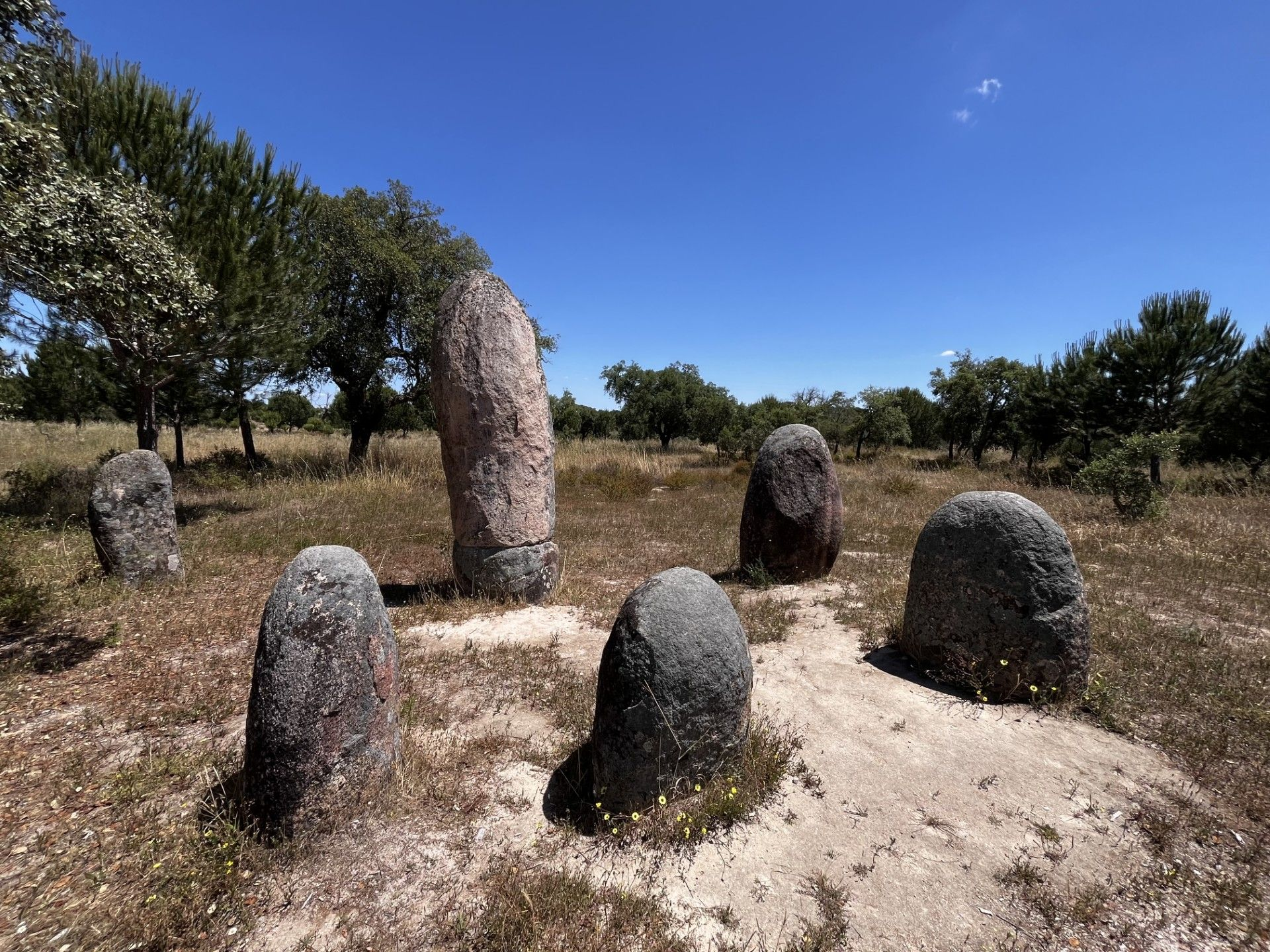
Fontaínhas Velhas Cromlech in Évora District, studied by Correia

== Publications ==
Correia's writing usually gave priority to making available previously unpublished information, as opposed to adopting a more theoretical approach. In his work on art history, he paid particular attention to historical documents, such as those relating to the construction of the Jerónimos Monastery in Belém, Lisbon or the altarpiece of Our Lady of the Assumption Cathedral, Lamego. His numerous publications included works on Visigothic art in 1928, medieval and Renaissance art (1940, 1941), and medieval funerary sculpture (1918, 1921, 1924, 1929). He is widely credited with having established art history as a discipline in Portugal and his work on church frescoes brought to attention a previously neglected topic. His study on popular Portuguese art provided the first methodological approach for the analysis of folk-art materials in ethnographic and anthropological research in Portugal. In all, he published more than one hundred works.

== Photography ==
An exhibition of photographs by Correia was presented at the Torre do Tombo National Archive in 2017. This brought to people's attention a previously unknown aspect of Correia, his mastery of photography. The exhibition, which presented 36 of about one thousand available examples of his work on glass plates, displayed a strong anthropological emphasis in his photography, showing examples of popular arts, traditions, festivals, and other customs of Portuguese rural communities. His concern to document the work of peasants, workers, and artisans and his clear interdisciplinary approach stands out. While the photographs had considerable ethnographic and documentary value, they also displayed a high technical ability.

== The Cheruskia ==
During World War One German ships in Portuguese ports were seized, which led Germany to declare war on Portugal in 1916. One of the around 70 ships, the steamship Cheruskia, which had sailed from Basra in modern-day Iraq, had a cargo of 448 crates with objects found during excavations carried out by the Deutsche Orient-Gesellschaft, a German association dedicated to the study of the Near East. The objects, which included ceramic fragments, seals, stelae, glazed bricks, vases and small sculptures, sections of columns, bronze rings, and bracelets, had been collected by teams headed by Walter Andrae. They were destined for museums in Germany but remained in Portugal until 1926. Having inspected the crates, Correia argued strongly that the contents should be sent to Germany, believing that scientific work should always be respected. This was in contrast to the official Portuguese position, which was initially that they should be treated as enemy merchandise and sold and, later, that the items should be kept and entrusted to the University of Porto to establish an Assyrian museum. His role in supporting the return of the collection and in preventing its theft and dispersal while the crates were in storage at the Port of Lisbon won admiration from German archaeologists. Eventually, the collection was returned to Germany, with the Portuguese government receiving a selection from archaeological and ethnographic collections in German museums.

== Brief imprisonment ==
Correia was an intellectual who did not usually involve himself in politics. However, he was a strong defender of the republican values of freedom and access to education and culture, a Freemason, an agnostic and a defender of civil liberties. In the early 1930s, he was imprisoned in the Cadeia do Aljube prison in the centre of Lisbon for eight days, after being accused of harbouring Commander Francisco Aragão e Melo, an opponent of the Estado Novo regime.

== Awards and honours ==
Correia was made an officer of the Military Order of Saint James of the Sword in 1920. He also received the Badge of Honor of the German Red Cross.

== Death ==
Correia died on 3 June 1944, after falling from a tram in Coimbra.
