= List of damselflies of the world (Synlestidae) =

== Chlorolestes genus ==
- Chlorolestes apricans
- Chlorolestes assegaii
- Chlorolestes conspicuus
- Chlorolestes draconicus
- Chlorolestes elegans
- Chlorolestes fasciatus
- Chlorolestes tessellatus
- Chlorolestes umbratus

== Chorismagrion genus ==
- Chorismagrion risi

== Ecchlorolestes genus ==
- Ecchlorolestes nylephtha
- Ecchlorolestes peringueyi

== Episynlestes genus ==
- Episynlestes albicaudus
- Episynlestes cristatus
- Episynlestes intermedius

== Megalestes genus ==
- Megalestes chengi
- Megalestes distans
- Megalestes haui
- Megalestes heros
- Megalestes irma
- Megalestes kurahashii
- Megalestes lieftincki
- Megalestes maai
- Megalestes major
- Megalestes micans
- Megalestes raychoudhurii
- Megalestes riccii
- Megalestes suensoni
- Megalestes tuska

== Phylolestes genus ==
- Phylolestes ethelae

== Sinolestes genus ==
- Sinolestes editus
- Sinolestes ornatus

== Synlestes genus ==
- Synlestes selysi
- Synlestes tropicus
- Synlestes weyersii
