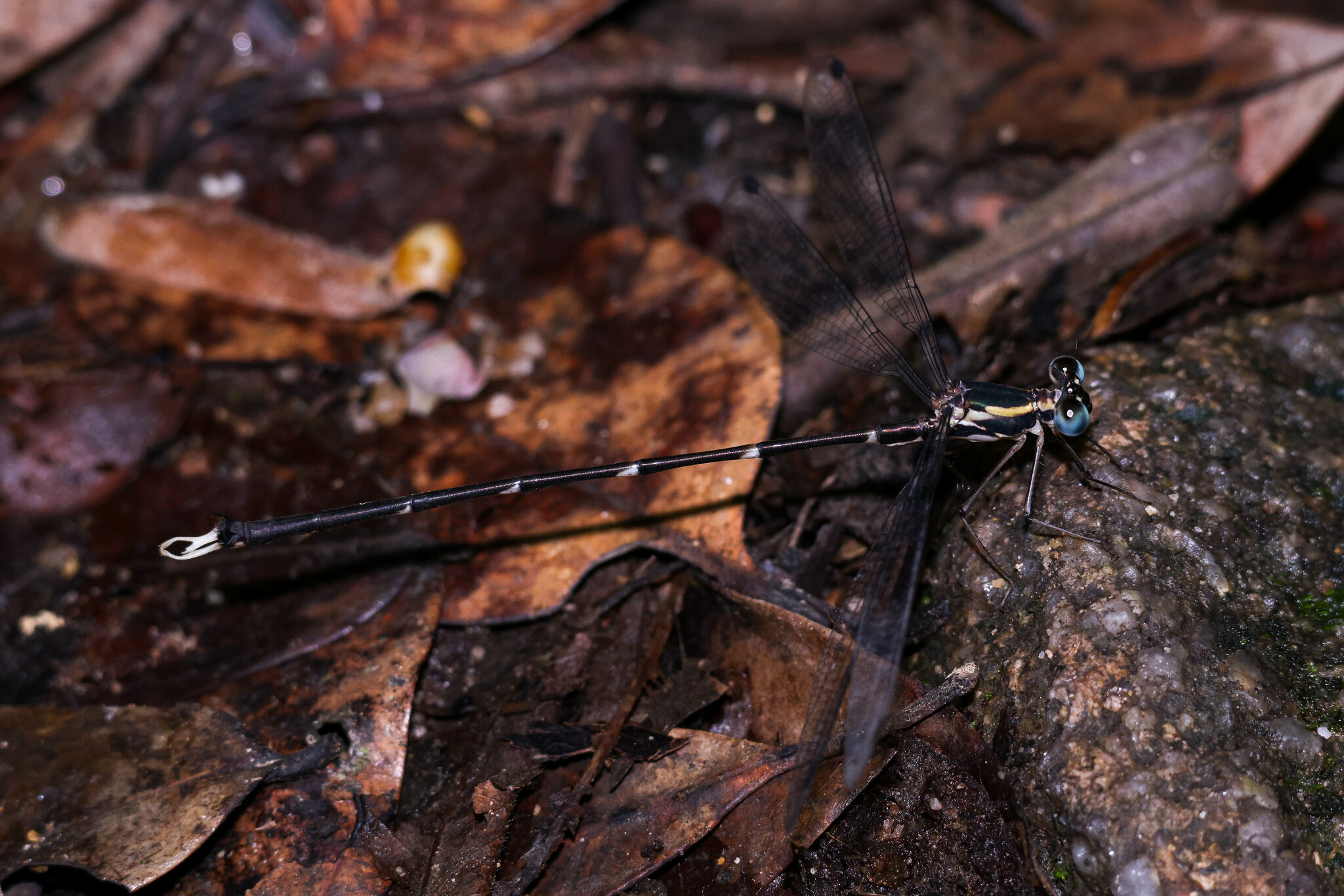
- Episynlestes intermedius

Conservation status
- Vulnerable (IUCN 3.1)

Scientific classification
- Kingdom: Animalia
- Phylum: Arthropoda
- Clade: Pancrustacea
- Class: Insecta
- Order: Odonata
- Suborder: Zygoptera
- Family: Synlestidae
- Genus: Episynlestes
- Species: E. intermedius

Binomial name
- Episynlestes intermedius Theischinger & Watson, 1985

= Episynlestes intermedius =

Intermediate whitetip

Species of damselfly

Episynlestes intermedius, commonly known as intermediate whitetip, is a species of Australian damselfly in the family Synlestidae. It is endemic to the Eungella area of Queensland, where it inhabits streams.

Episynlestes intermedius is a large, very slender damselfly, coloured a dull bronze-black with white markings. It often perches with its wings outspread.

== Etymology ==
The genus name Episynlestes is derived from the Greek ἐπί (epi, "upon", "over" or "additional to"), combined with Synlestes, a genus name derived from the Greek σύν (syn, "together") and Lestes, itself derived from the Greek λῃστής (lēstēs, "robber").

The species name intermedius is Latin for "intermediate", referring to characters intermediate between Episynlestes albicauda and Episynlestes cristatus.

== Gallery ==
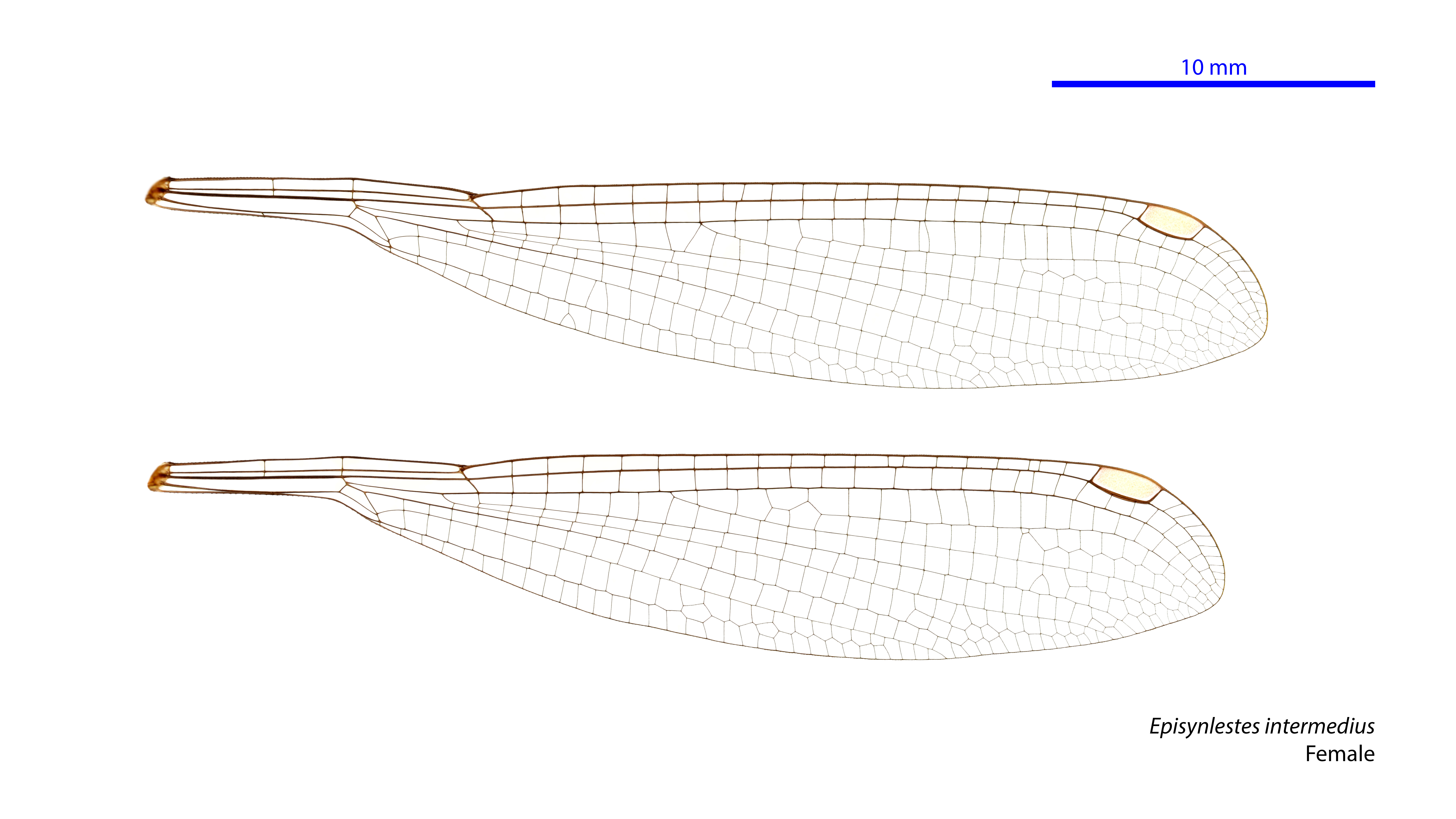
Female wings

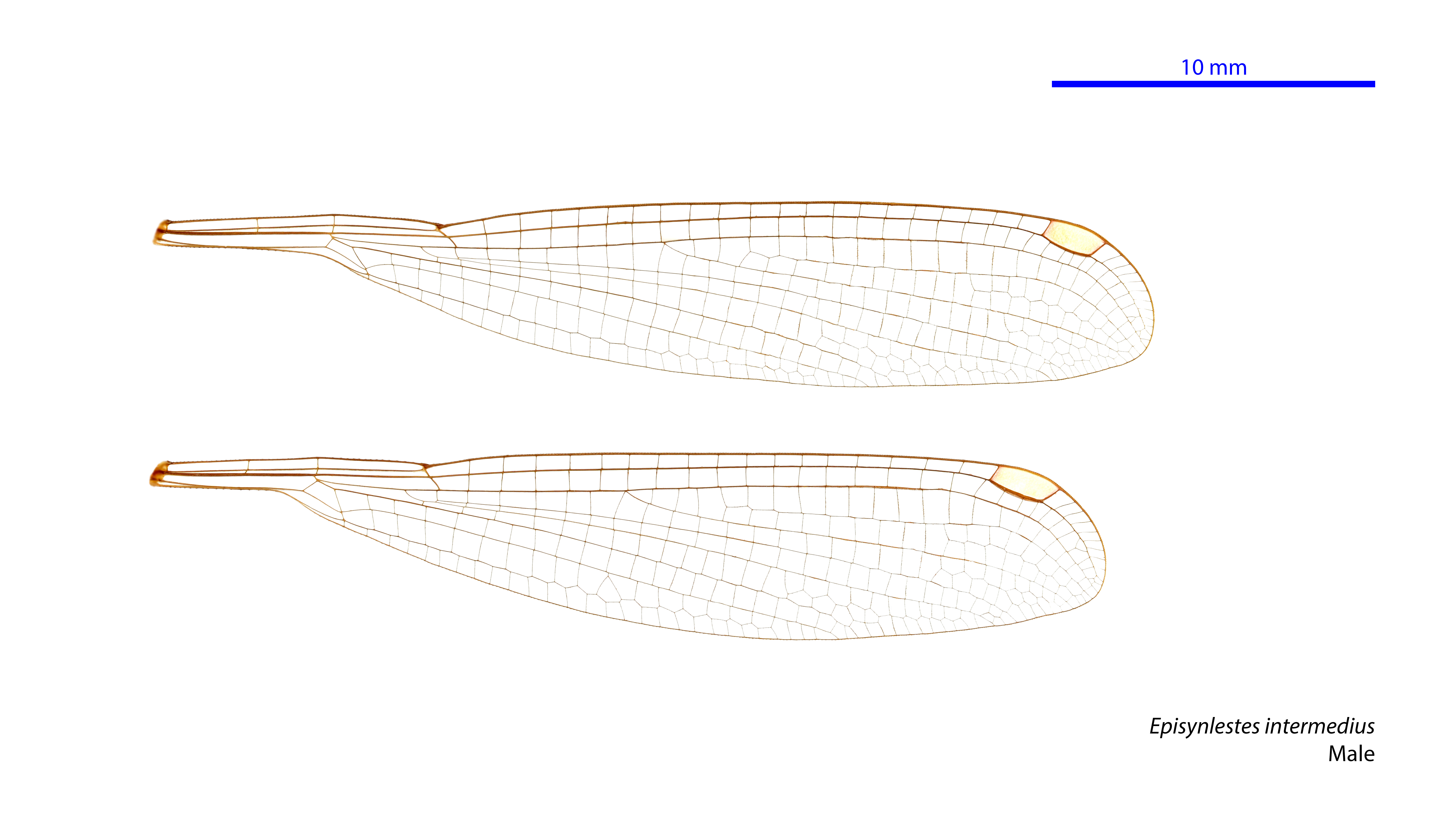
Male wings

== See also ==
- List of Odonata species of Australia
