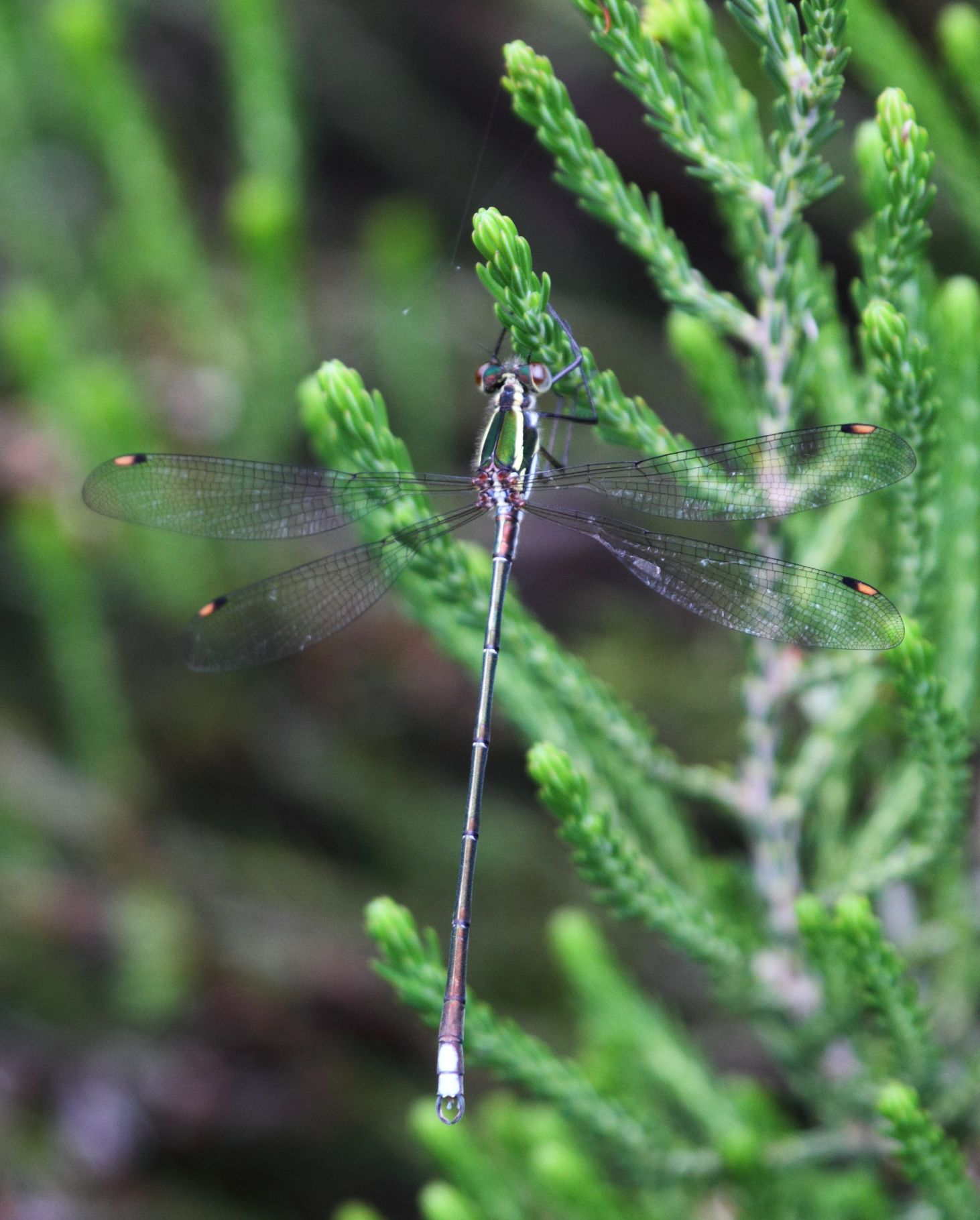
- Male

Conservation status
- Least Concern (IUCN 3.1)

Scientific classification
- Kingdom: Animalia
- Phylum: Arthropoda
- Class: Insecta
- Order: Odonata
- Suborder: Zygoptera
- Family: Synlestidae
- Genus: Chlorolestes
- Species: C. draconicus

Binomial name
- Chlorolestes draconicus Balinsky, 1956

Synonyms
- Chlorolestes draconica Balinsky, 1956 [orth. error]

= Chlorolestes draconicus =

Species of damselfly

Chlorolestes draconicus, the Drakensberg malachite, is a species of damselfly in the family Synlestidae.

== Distribution and status ==
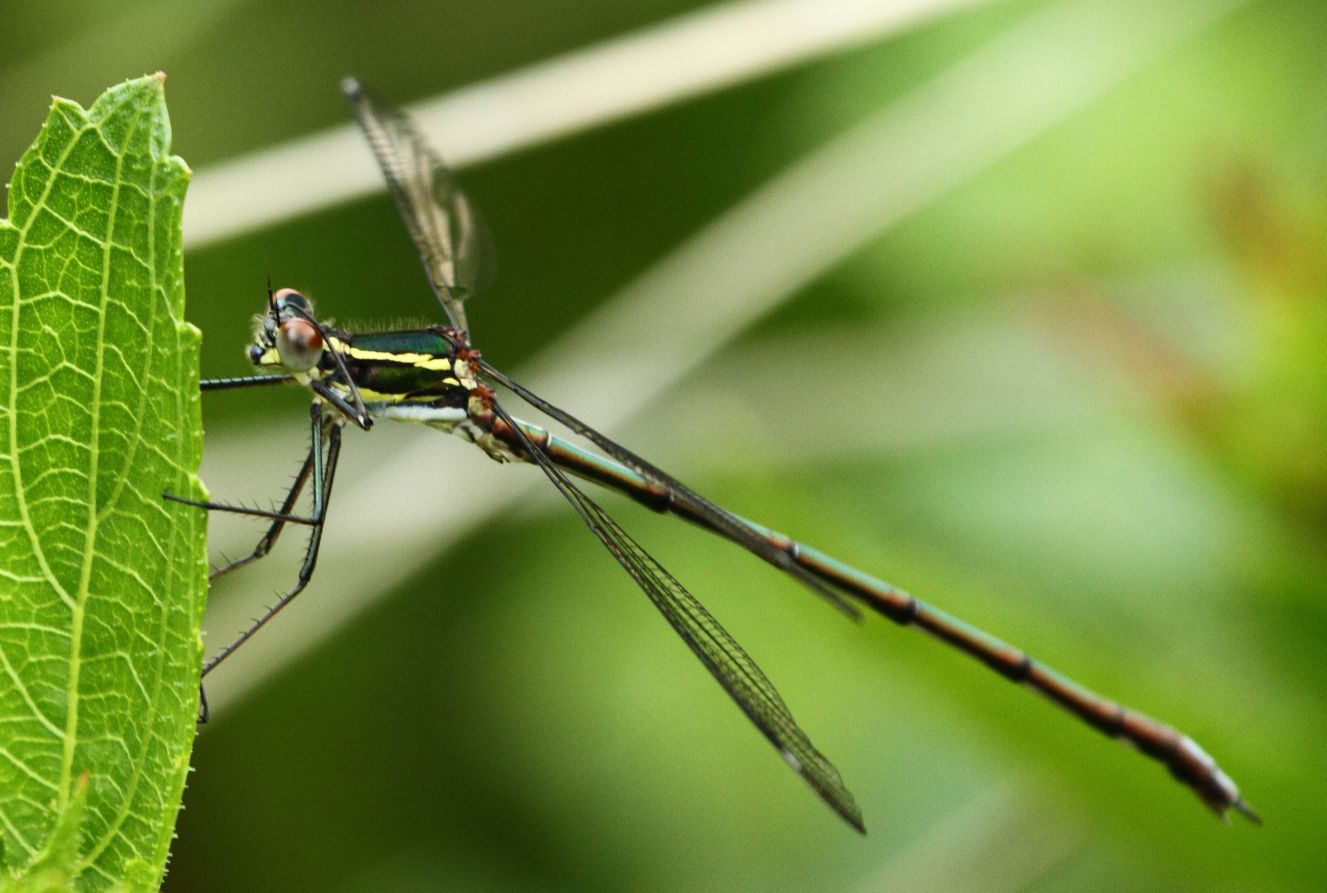
Male Drakensberg malachite. Kamberg Nature Reserve

This species has a restricted range in the Drakensberg mountains of Lesotho and South Africa. Its conservation status has been assessed as Least Concern as much of its range falls within the uKhahlamba / Drakensberg Park.

== Habitat ==
Its natural habitat is rocky streams at high altitude (1700–3000 m).

== Identification ==
Where Chlorolestes draconicus is found, it is usually outnumbered by the similar Chlorolestes fasciatus. Key differences between these species are the shape of the antehumeral stripe and the shape of the appendages. Chlorolestes draconicus is also larger and darker than Chlorolestes fasciatus.

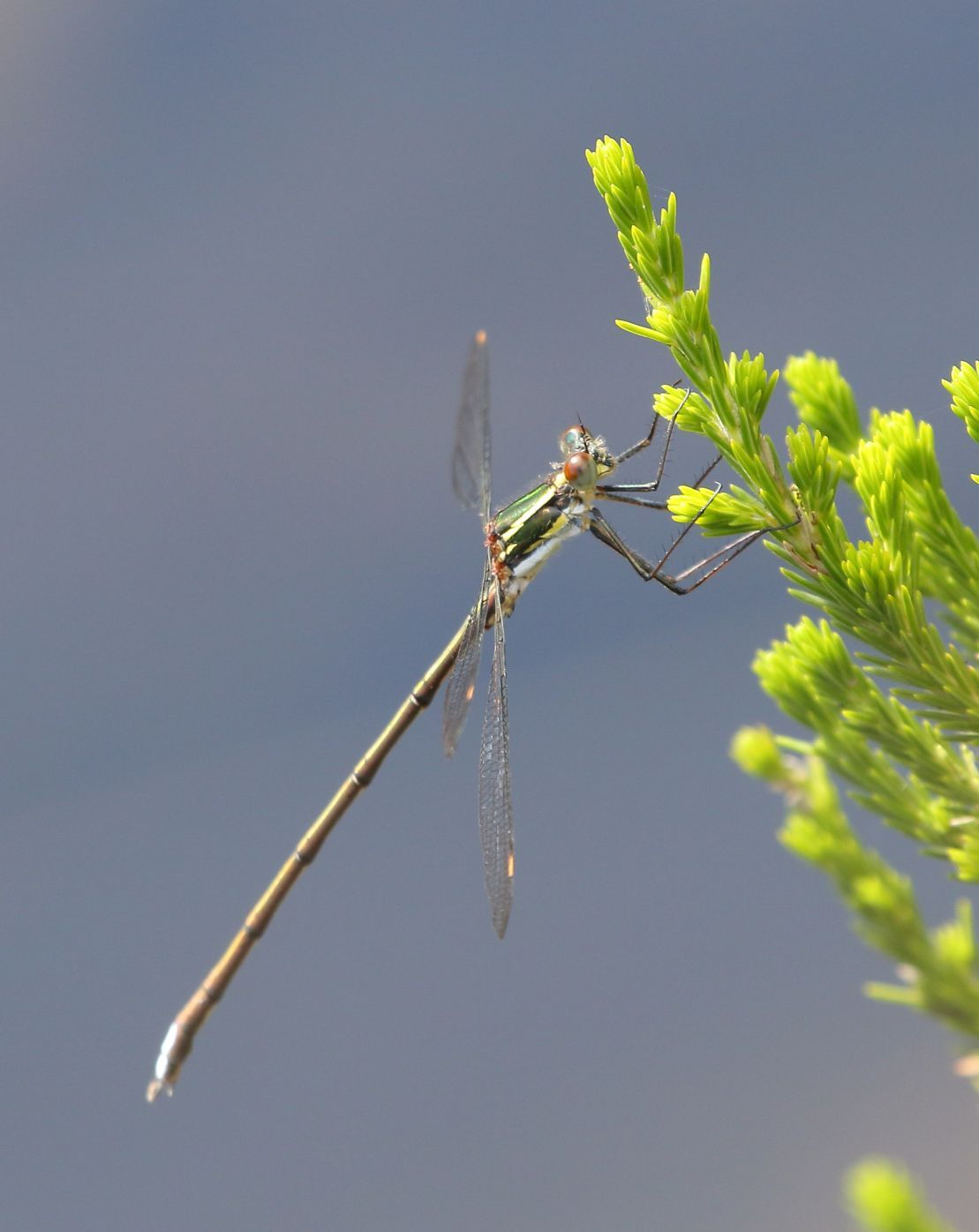
Male

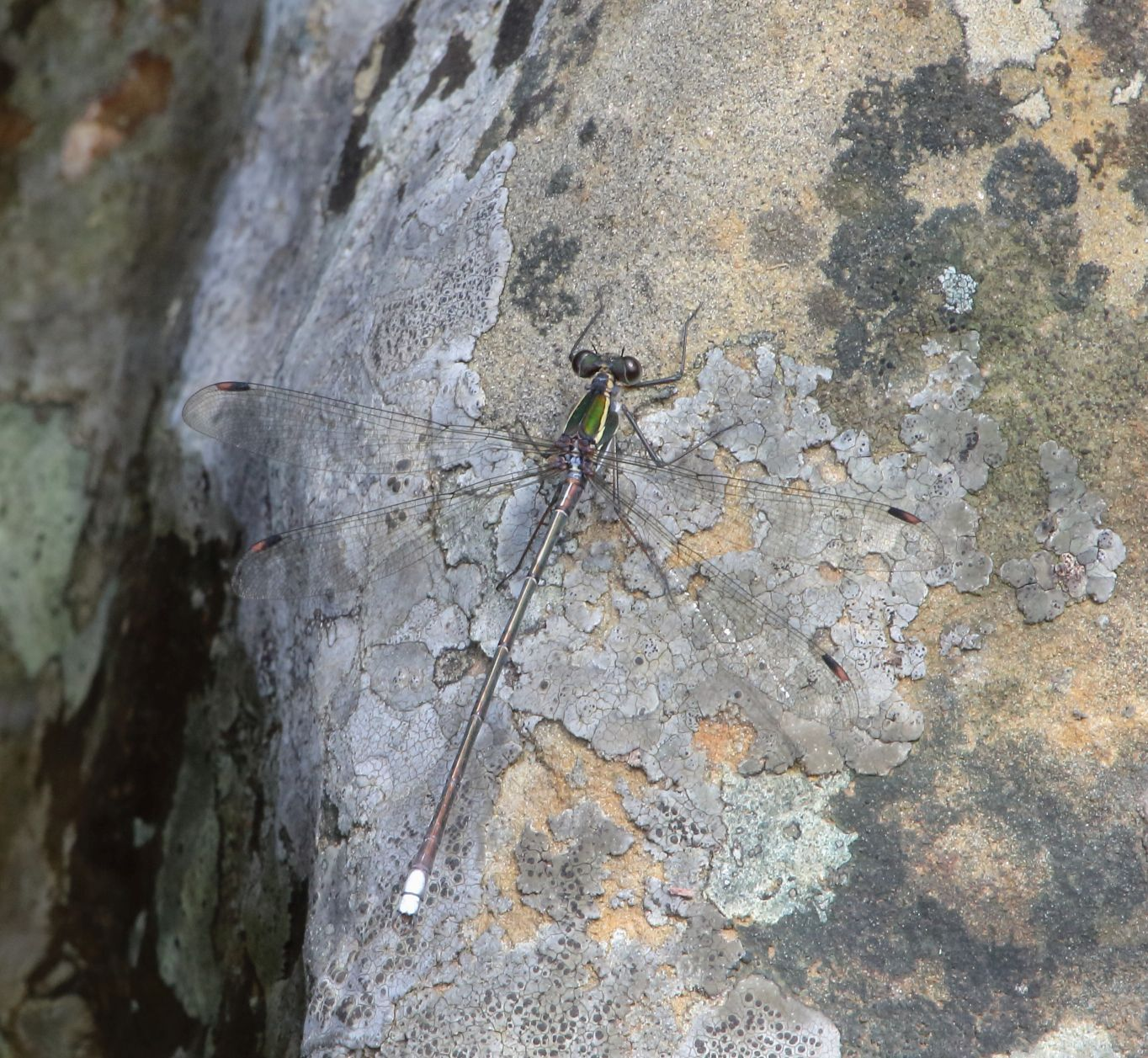
Male

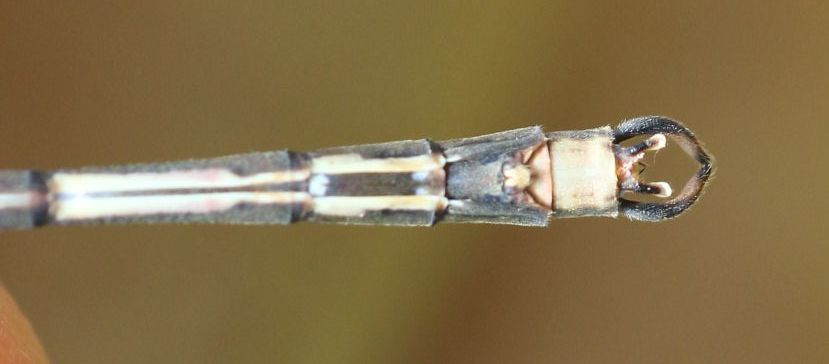
Detail of male abdomen; ventral view

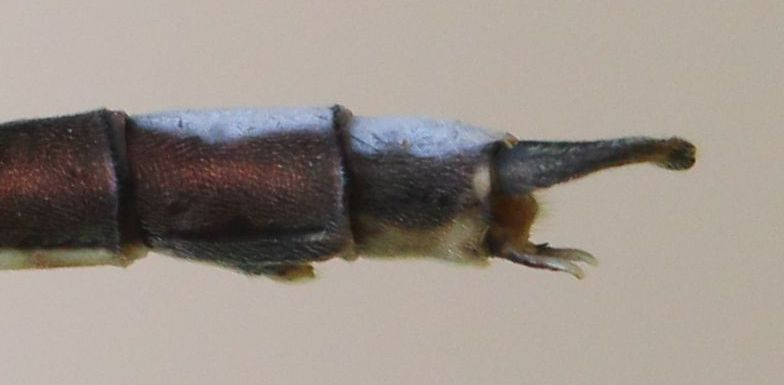
Detail of male abdomen; lateral view

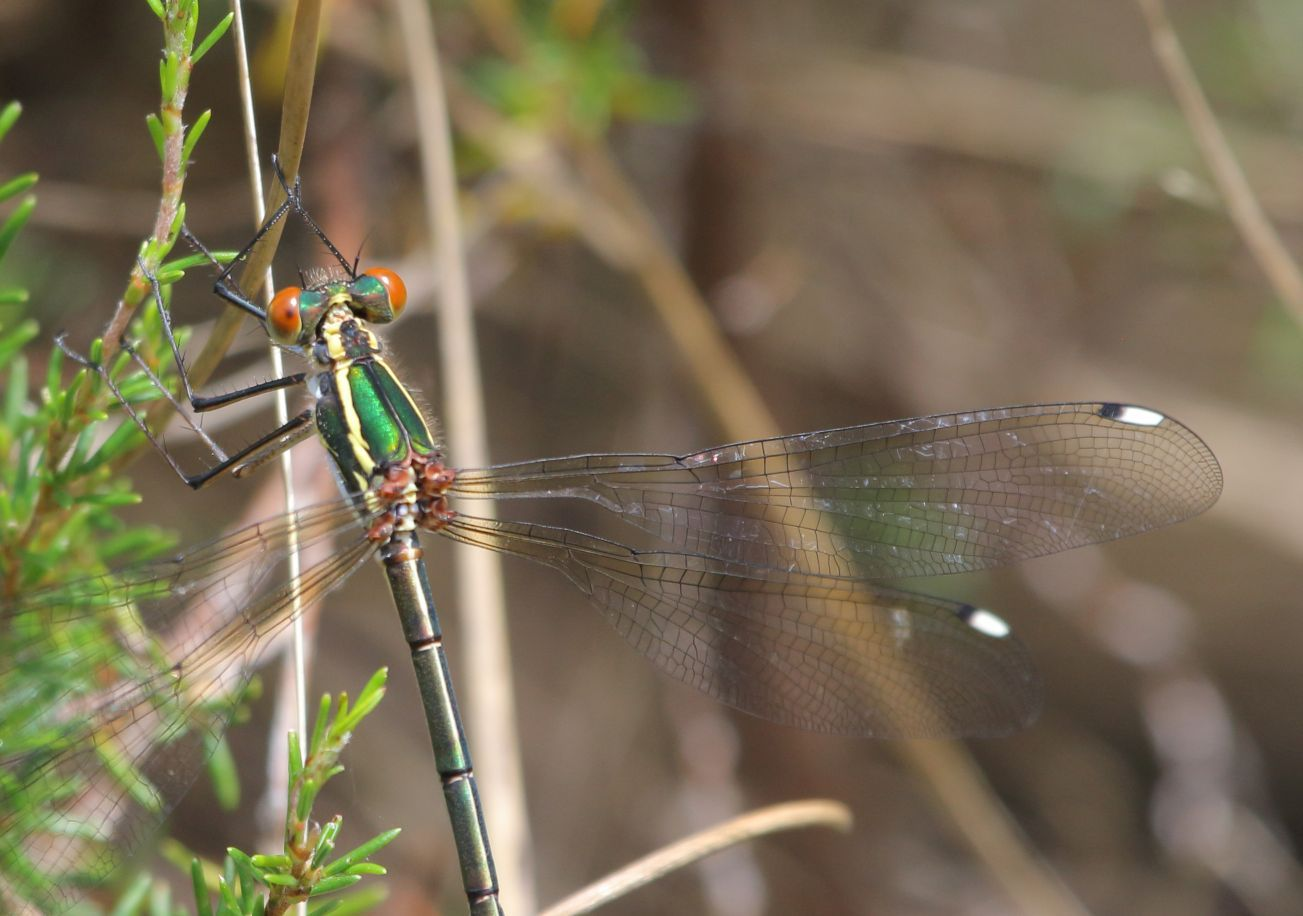
Female

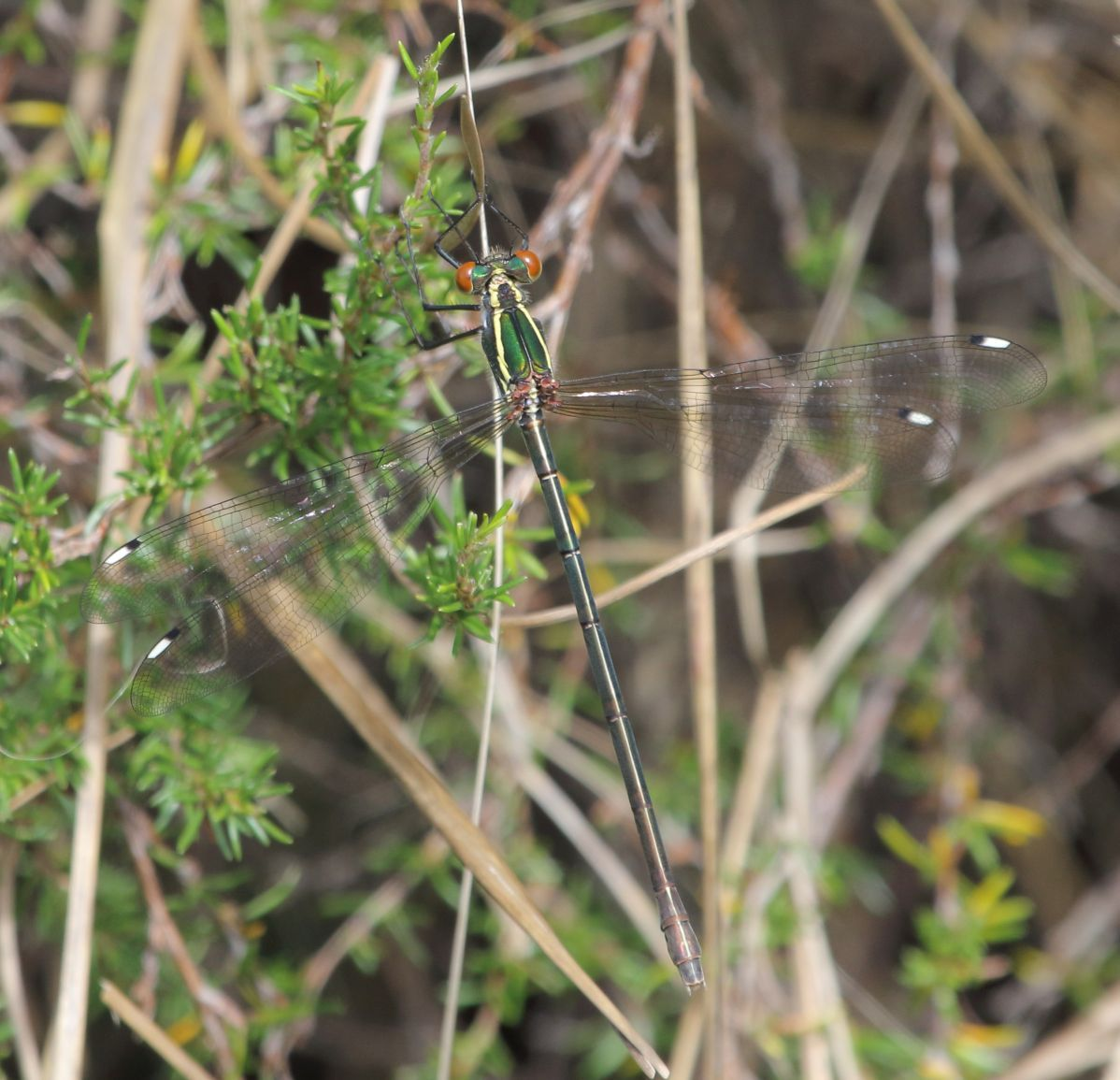
Female

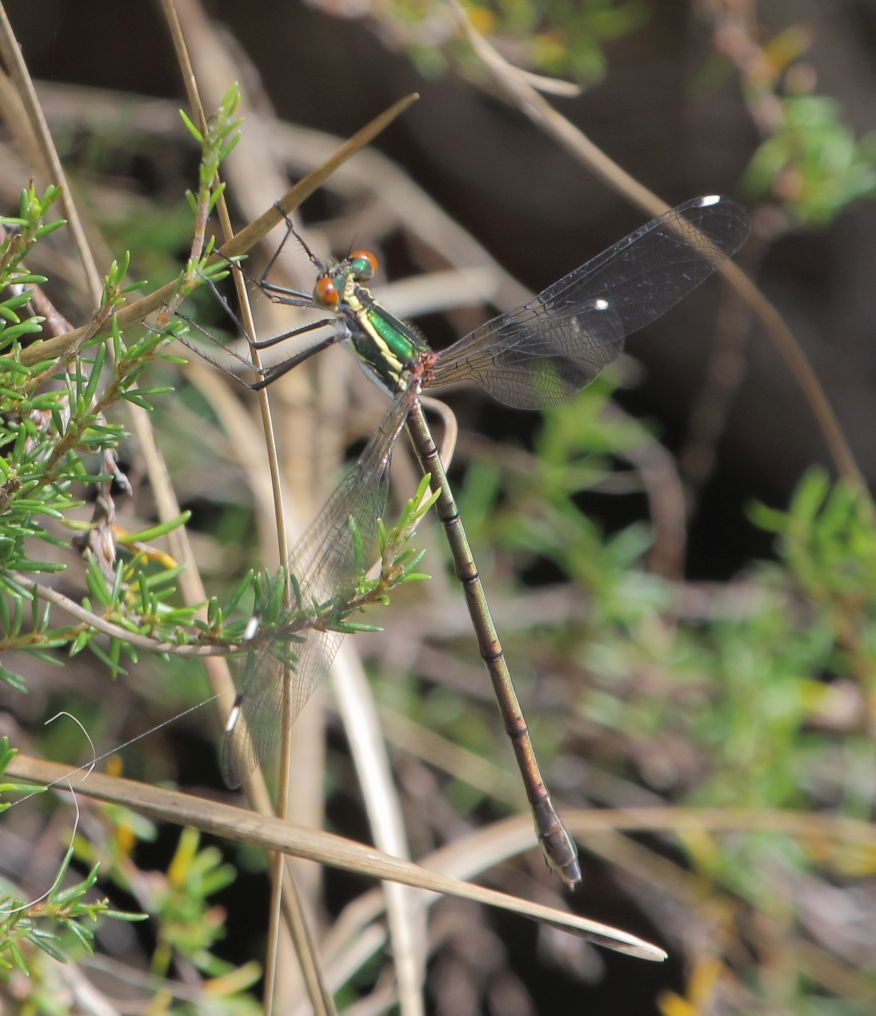
Female

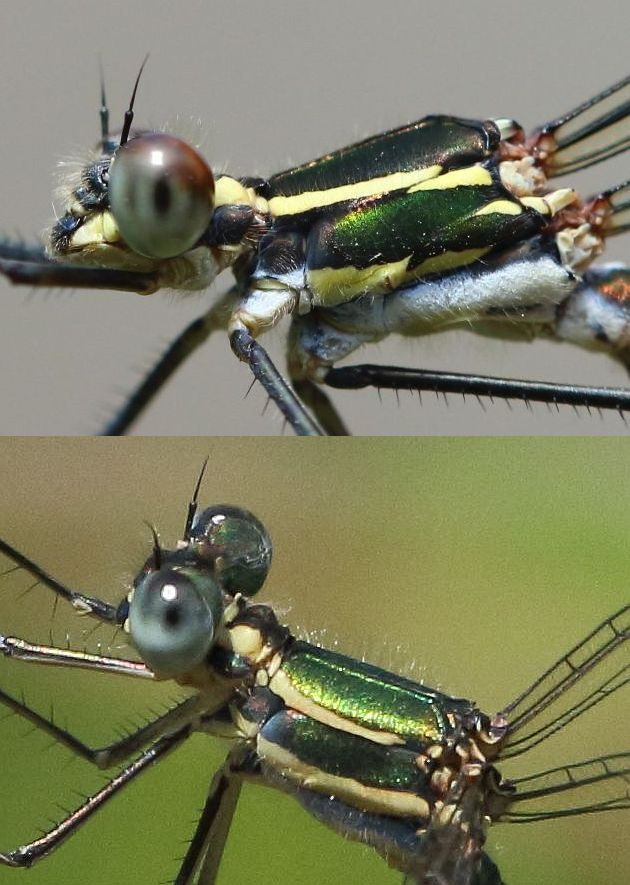
Comparison of the thoracic patterns of the Drakensberg malachite (top) and the mountain malachite
