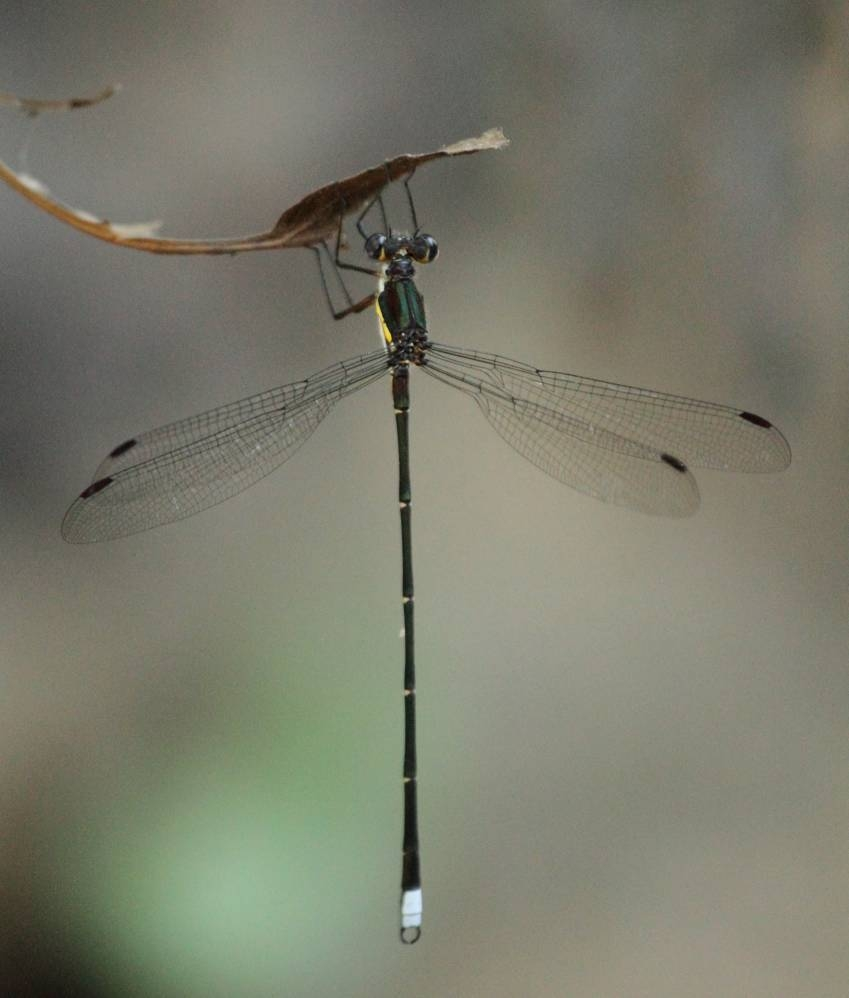
- Male

Conservation status
- Least Concern (IUCN 3.1)

Scientific classification
- Domain: Eukaryota
- Kingdom: Animalia
- Phylum: Arthropoda
- Class: Insecta
- Order: Odonata
- Suborder: Zygoptera
- Family: Synlestidae
- Genus: Chlorolestes
- Species: C. conspicuus

Binomial name
- Chlorolestes conspicuus Selys, 1862

= Chlorolestes conspicuus =

Species of damselfly

Chlorolestes conspicuus, the conspicuous malachite is a species of damselfly in the family Synlestidae. It is endemic to south-western South Africa. This species is found at rivers and streams in both open and wooded valleys.

Although its range is restricted, this locally common species is not threatened at present.

The largest species in its genus, it is 59–65 mm long with a wingspan of 64–72 mm. Males and females are similar; the thorax and abdomen are metallic-green aging to coppery brown. The thorax has yellow or bronze antehumeral stripes. Both sexes can be distinguished from other malachites by their long (>2.5 mm), uniformly coloured pterostigmata and wing venation.
