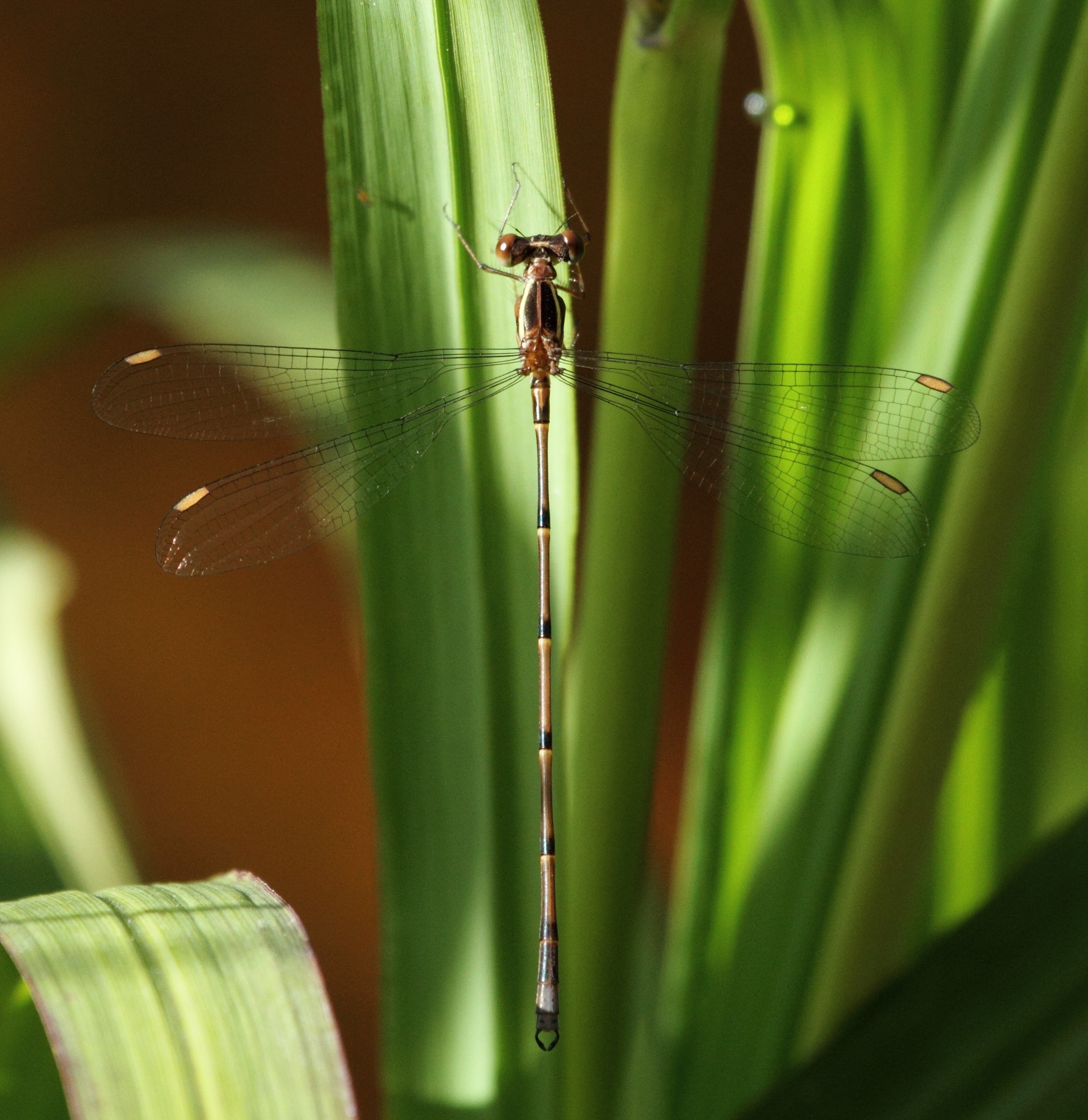
- Male

Conservation status
- Least Concern (IUCN 3.1)

Scientific classification
- Kingdom: Animalia
- Phylum: Arthropoda
- Class: Insecta
- Order: Odonata
- Suborder: Zygoptera
- Family: Synlestidae
- Genus: Chlorolestes
- Species: C. umbratus

Binomial name
- Chlorolestes umbratus Hagen in Selys, 1862

= Chlorolestes umbratus =

Species of damselfly

Chlorolestes umbratus, the white malachite is a species of damselfly in the family Synlestidae. It is endemic to southern South Africa. This species is found along rivers and streams in both forest and fynbos.

Although its range is restricted, and has declined in the past, this species is locally common and has recovered where alien tree species have been removed from waterways.

A small malachite; 38–47 mm long with a wingspan of 46–52 mm. Some males develop a whitish pruinose-blue bloom on the upper thorax, and smoky-black wing bands. Non-pruinose males and females have a metallic-green or brown thorax and abdomen; the thorax has yellow antehumeral stripes. Both sexes can be distinguished from other malachites by their small size, uniformly coloured pterostigmata and wing venation.
