= Megalestes riccii =

Conservation status
- Least Concern (IUCN 3.1)

Scientific classification
- Kingdom: Animalia
- Phylum: Arthropoda
- Class: Insecta
- Order: Odonata
- Suborder: Zygoptera
- Family: Synlestidae
- Genus: Megalestes
- Species: M. riccii

Binomial name
- Megalestes riccii Navás, 1935

Species of damselfly

Megalestes riccii is a species of damselfly in the genus Megalestes.

In China, Megalestes riccii is only known from four localities, but the species is widespread and locally common in montane forested regions of central and northern Taiwan, including several extensive, protected forested areas. The extent of occurrence for this species is large (EOO is larger than 400,000 km^{2}). The species is therefore assessed as Least Concern.
