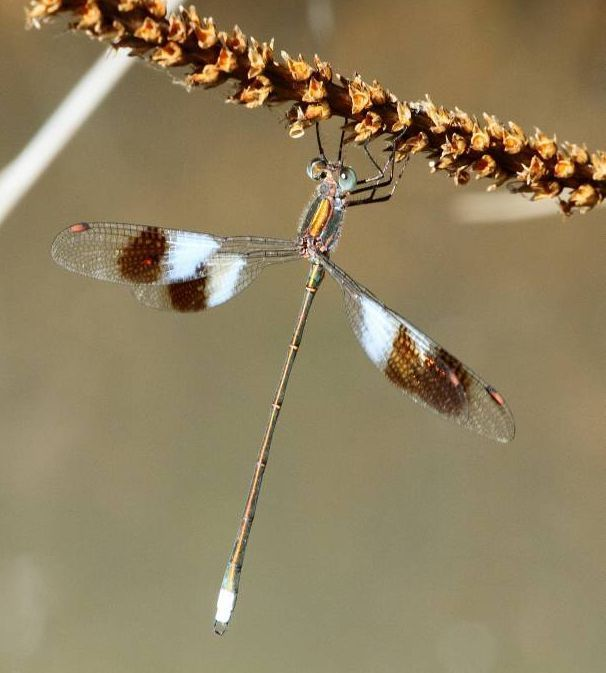
- Male Chlorolestes fasciatus

Scientific classification
- Kingdom: Animalia
- Phylum: Arthropoda
- Clade: Pancrustacea
- Class: Insecta
- Order: Odonata
- Suborder: Zygoptera
- Family: Synlestidae
- Genus: Chlorolestes; Selys, 1862

= Chlorolestes =

Genus of damselflies

Chlorolestes is a genus of damselflies in the family Synlestidae. They are commonly known as Malachites.

The genus is endemic to southern Africa; furthermore, the range of only one species, Chlorolestes elegans, extends further north than north-eastern South Africa.

The genus contains the following species:

- Chlorolestes apricans Wilmot, 1975 - Basking Malachite
- Chlorolestes conspicuus Hagen in Selys, 1862 - Conspicuous Malachite
- Chlorolestes draconicus Balinsky, 1956 - Drakensberg Malachite
- Chlorolestes elegans Pinhey, 1950 - Elegant Malachite
- Chlorolestes fasciatus Burmeister, 1839 - Mountain Malachite
- Chlorolestes tessellatus Burmeister, 1839 - Forest Malachite
- Chlorolestes umbratus Selys, 1862 - White Malachite
