= Megalestes =

Scientific classification
- Domain: Eukaryota
- Kingdom: Animalia
- Phylum: Arthropoda
- Class: Insecta
- Order: Odonata
- Suborder: Zygoptera
- Family: Synlestidae
- Genus: Megalestes; Selys, 1862

Genus of damselflies

Megalestes is a genus of malachite in the damselfly family Synlestidae. There are at least 20 described species in Megalestes.

== Species ==
These 20 species belong to the genus Megalestes:

- Megalestes anglicus Cockerell
- Megalestes australis Karube, 2014
- Megalestes chengi Chao, 1947
- Megalestes discus Wilson, 2004
- Megalestes distans Needham, 1930
- Megalestes gyalsey Gyeltshen, Kalkman & Orr, 2017
- Megalestes haui Wilson & Reels, 2003
- Megalestes heros Needham, 1930
- Megalestes irma Fraser, 1926
- Megalestes kurahashii Asahina, 1985
- Megalestes lieftincki Lahiri, 1979
- Megalestes maai Chen, 1947
- Megalestes major Selys, 1862
- Megalestes micans Needham, 1930
- Megalestes omeiensis Chao, 1965
- Megalestes palaceus Zhou & Zhou, 2008
- Megalestes raychoudhurii Lahiri, 1987
- Megalestes riccii Navás, 1935
- Megalestes suensoni Asahina, 1956
- Megalestes tuska Wilson & Reels, 2003
