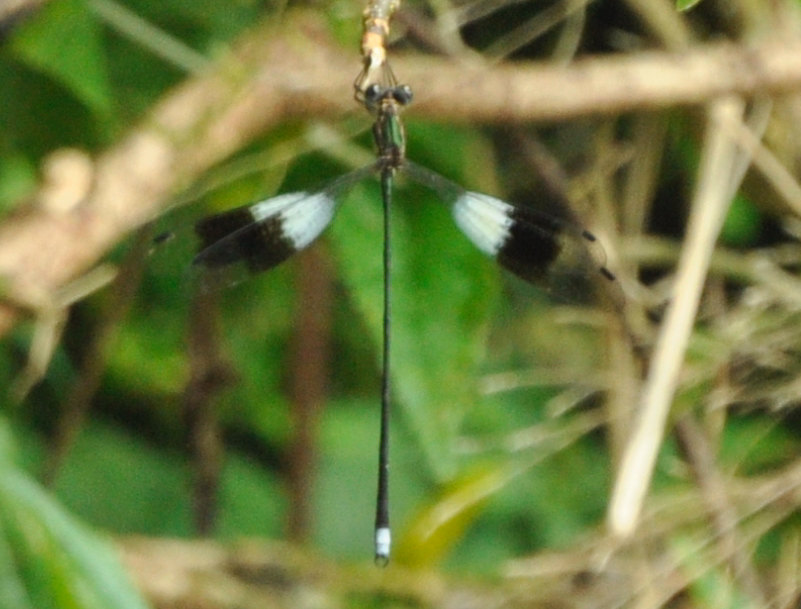

Conservation status
- Near Threatened (IUCN 3.1)

Scientific classification
- Kingdom: Animalia
- Phylum: Arthropoda
- Class: Insecta
- Order: Odonata
- Suborder: Zygoptera
- Family: Synlestidae
- Genus: Chlorolestes
- Species: C. elegans

Binomial name
- Chlorolestes elegans Pinhey, 1950

= Chlorolestes elegans =

Species of damselfly

Chlorolestes elegans is a species of damselfly in the family Synlestidae. It is found in Botswana, Malawi, Mozambique, South Africa, and Zimbabwe. Its natural habitats are subtropical or tropical moist montane forests and rivers. It is threatened by habitat loss.
