= Chlorolestes apricans =

Conservation status
- Endangered (IUCN 3.1)

Scientific classification
- Kingdom: Animalia
- Phylum: Arthropoda
- Class: Insecta
- Order: Odonata
- Suborder: Zygoptera
- Family: Synlestidae
- Genus: Chlorolestes
- Species: C. apricans

Binomial name
- Chlorolestes apricans Wilmot, 1975

Species of damselfly

Chlorolestes apricans is a species of damselfly in the family Synlestidae.

== Distribution and status ==
This damselfly is endemic to South Africa where it has a restricted range in the Eastern Cape.

== Habitat ==
This species is found along streams in both open and shaded situations. It is threatened by habitat loss resulting from the trampling of stream banks by cattle and from the shading of streams by the alien invasive black wattle, Acacia mearnsii.
