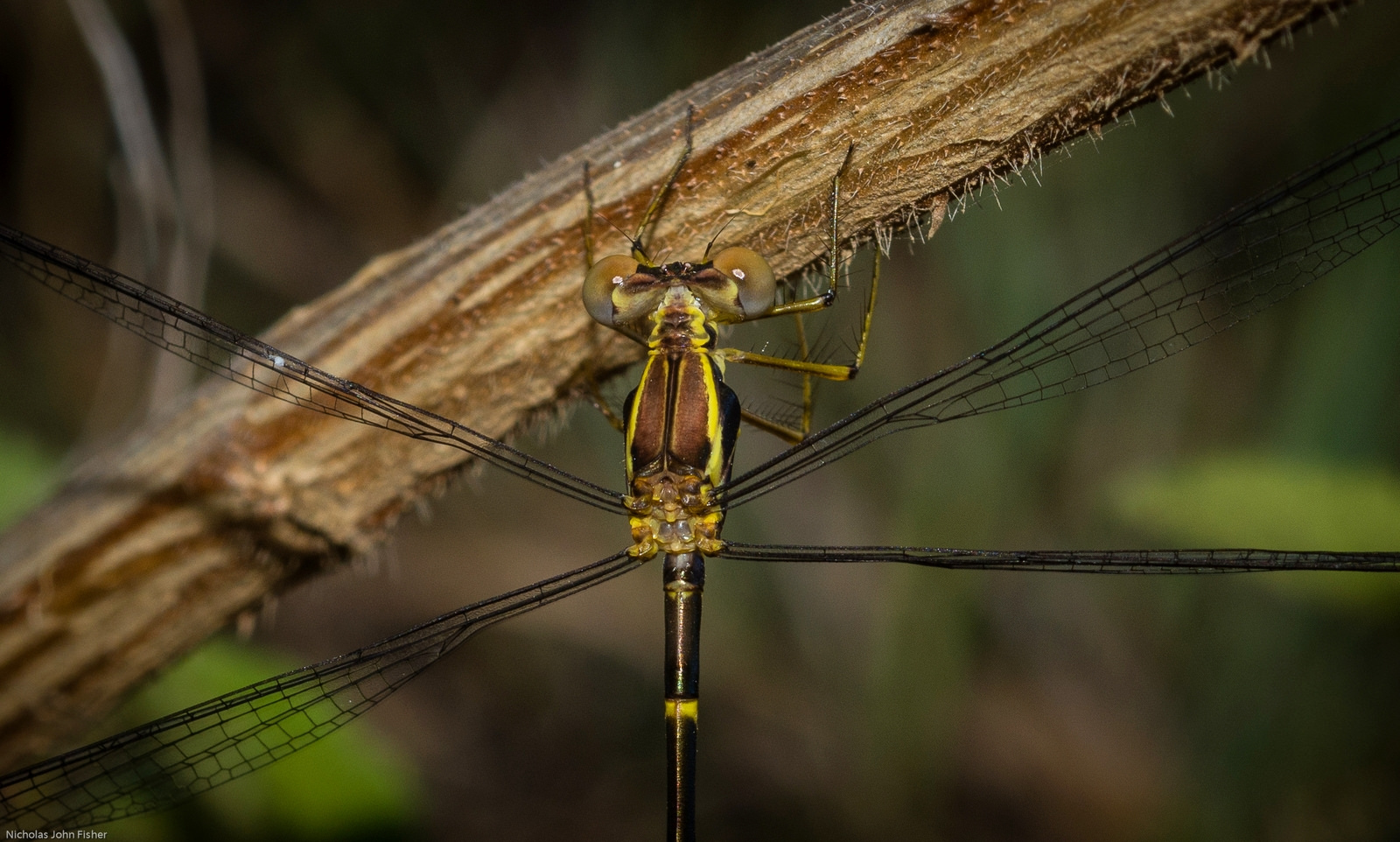
- Episynlestes albicaudus

Scientific classification
- Kingdom: Animalia
- Phylum: Arthropoda
- Clade: Pancrustacea
- Class: Insecta
- Order: Odonata
- Suborder: Zygoptera
- Family: Synlestidae
- Genus: Episynlestes; Kennedy, 1920

= Episynlestes =

Genus of damselflies

Episynlestes is a genus of damselflies in the family Synlestidae. Species of Episynlestes are large damselflies, dull bronze black in colour with pale markings and a white tip to their tails. They often perch with their wings outspread. They are endemic to north-eastern Australia, where they inhabit streams.

== Etymology ==
The genus name Episynlestes is derived from the Greek ἐπί (epi, "upon", "over" or "additional to"), combined with Synlestes, a genus name derived from the Greek σύν (syn, "together") and Lestes, itself derived from the Greek λῃστής (lēstēs, "robber"). The name refers to its relationship to Synlestes as an additional allied genus.

== Species ==
The genus Episynlestes includes the following species:

Genus Episynlestes – Kennedy, 1920 – three species
Common name	Scientific name and subspecies	Range	Size and ecology	IUCN status and estimated population
Southern whitetip	Episynlestes albicaudus (Tillyard, 1913)	south-eastern Queensland and north-eastern New South Wales	Size: Habitat: streams and pools in rainforests. Diet:	LC
Tropical whitetip	Episynlestes cristatus Watson & Moulds, 1977	north-eastern Queensland	Size: Habitat: streams and pools in rainforests. Diet:	LC
Intermediate whitetip	Episynlestes intermedius Theischinger & Watson, 1985	Queensland	Size: Habitat: inhabits streams. Diet:	VU
