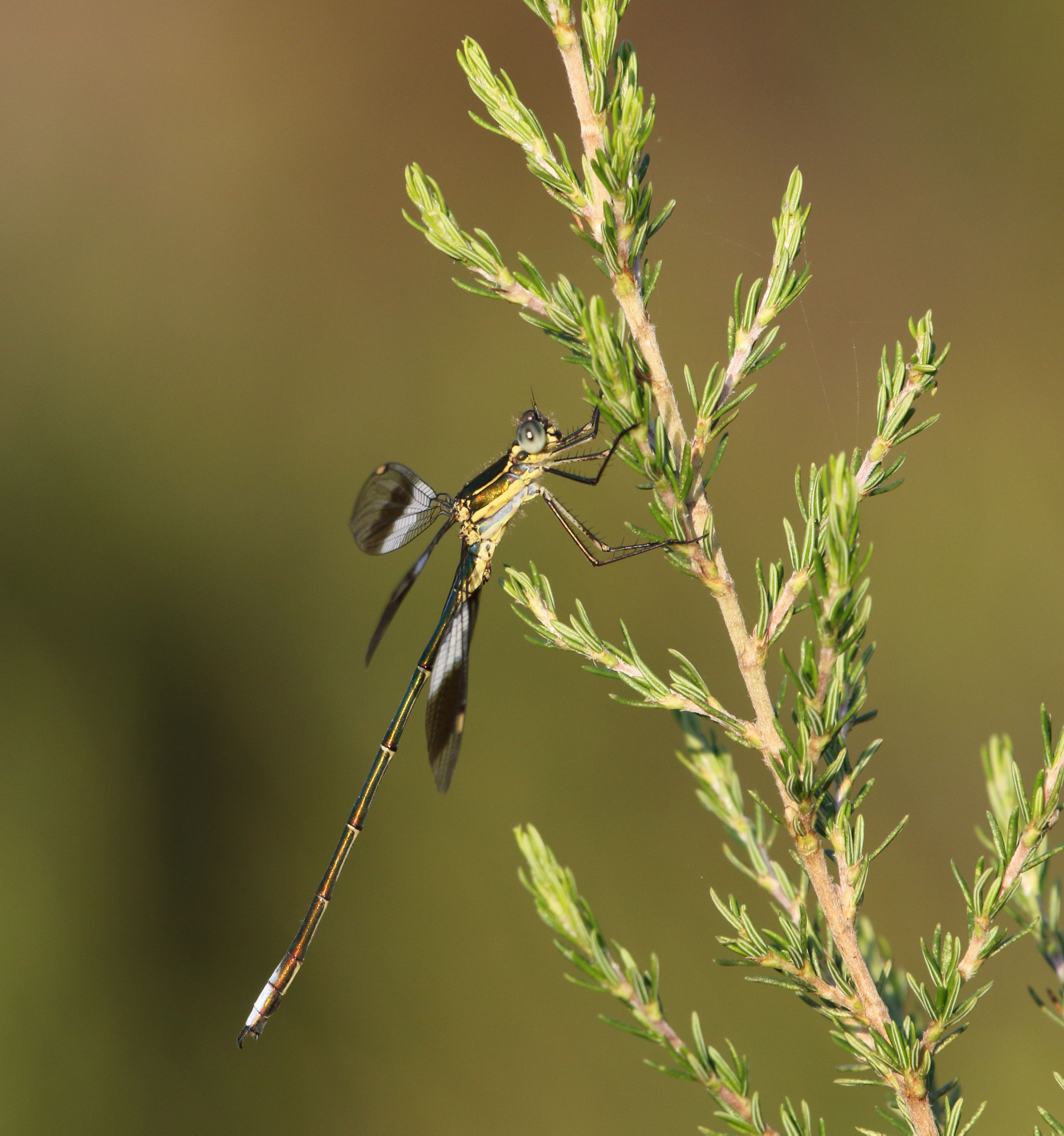
- Male; banded form

Conservation status
- Least Concern (IUCN 3.1)

Scientific classification
- Domain: Eukaryota
- Kingdom: Animalia
- Phylum: Arthropoda
- Class: Insecta
- Order: Odonata
- Suborder: Zygoptera
- Family: Synlestidae
- Genus: Chlorolestes
- Species: C. fasciatus

Binomial name
- Chlorolestes fasciatus Burmeister, 1839

= Chlorolestes fasciatus =

Species of damselfly

Chlorolestes fasciatus, the mountain malachite or mountain sylph is a species of damselfly in the family Synlestidae. It is found in Lesotho, South Africa and Eswatini. Its natural habitat is montane streams.

It is 39–54 mm long with a wingspan of 49–64 mm. Males and females are similar; the thorax and abdomen are metallic-green aging to coppery brown. The thorax has contrasting yellow antehumeral stripes; these are more narrow than those of the similar Forest Malachite. Most mature males have opalescent and blackish wing bands.

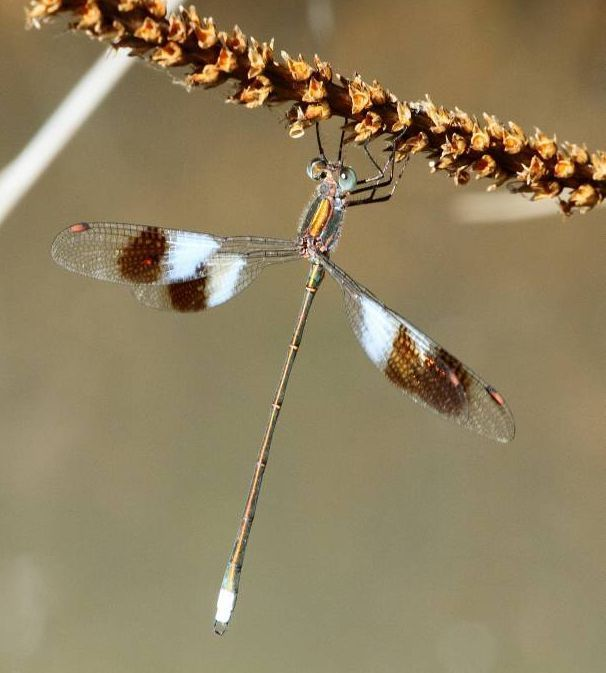
Male
