= Phylolestes =

Conservation status
- Endangered (IUCN 3.1)

Scientific classification
- Kingdom: Animalia
- Phylum: Arthropoda
- Class: Insecta
- Order: Odonata
- Suborder: Zygoptera
- Family: Synlestidae
- Genus: Phylolestes; Christiansen, 1947
- Species: P. ethelae

Binomial name
- Phylolestes ethelae Christiansen, 1947

Species of damselfly

Phylolestes is a monotypic genus of damselflies in the family Synlestidae. It contains the single species Phylolestes ethelae, the Hispaniolan malachite.

== Taxonomy ==
It is the only member of its family native to the Americas; all other species are found in Africa, Asia, and Australia.

== Distribution and habitat ==
It is endemic to the Caribbean island of Hispaniola, where it occurs in both the Dominican Republic and Haiti. It inhabits streamsides in forested mountain habitat around 2000 meters in elevation. The larvae develop in cold, clear pools.

== Conservation ==
This species has been noted at only three locations on Hispaniola. It is threatened by the destruction of its habitat, and is considered Endangered.
