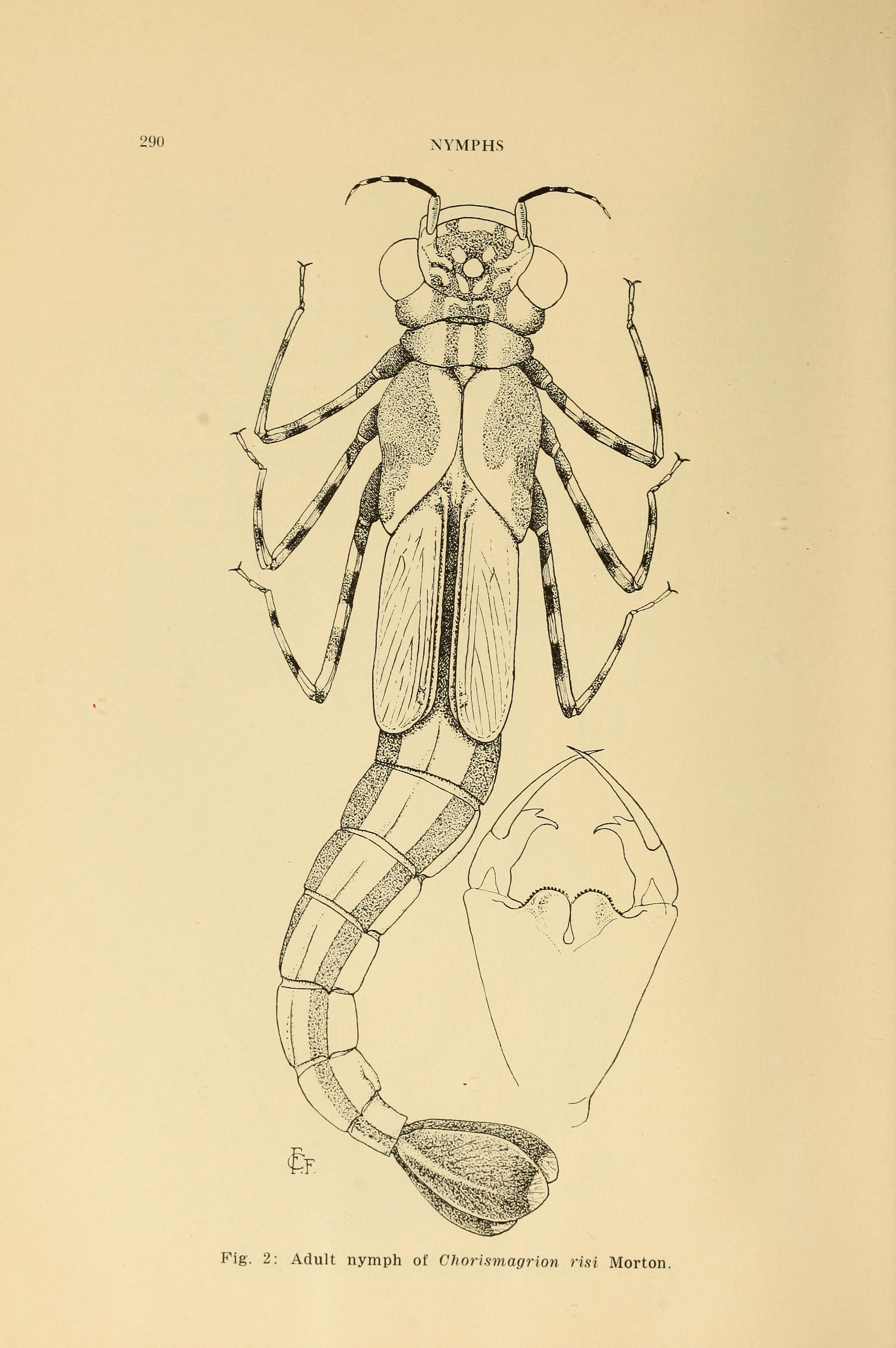
- Adult nymph of Chorismagrion risi

Conservation status
- Least Concern (IUCN 3.1)

Scientific classification
- Kingdom: Animalia
- Phylum: Arthropoda
- Clade: Pancrustacea
- Class: Insecta
- Order: Odonata
- Suborder: Zygoptera
- Family: Synlestidae
- Genus: Chorismagrion; Morton, 1914
- Species: C. risi

Binomial name
- Chorismagrion risi Morton, 1914

= Chorismagrion =

Pretty relict

Genus of damselflies

Chorismagrion is a monotypic genus of damselflies belonging to the family Synlestidae. The single species of this genus, Chorismagrion risi, known as a pretty relict, is a slender, medium-sized damselfly, mostly black in colour with white markings. It is endemic to north-eastern Australia, where it inhabits streams and large pools in rainforests.

== Taxonomy ==
Until 2014, Chorismagrion was considered to be the only genus in the family Chorismagrionidae. Following taxonomic revisions published in 2014, Chorismagrionidae was synonymised with the family Synlestidae, and Chorismagrion is now placed within Synlestidae.

== Etymology ==
The genus name Chorismagrion is derived from the Greek χωρισμός (chōrismos, "separation" or "being separated"), combined with Agrion, a genus name derived from the Greek ἄγριος (agrios, "wild"). Agrion was the name applied by Johan Christian Fabricius in 1775 to all damselflies. The name Chorismagrion refers to the marked differences in wing venation between this genus and Agrion.

In 1914, Kenneth Morton named this species risi, an eponym honouring his friend, the entomologist Friedrich Ris (1867-1931), of Rheinau, Switzerland.

== Gallery ==
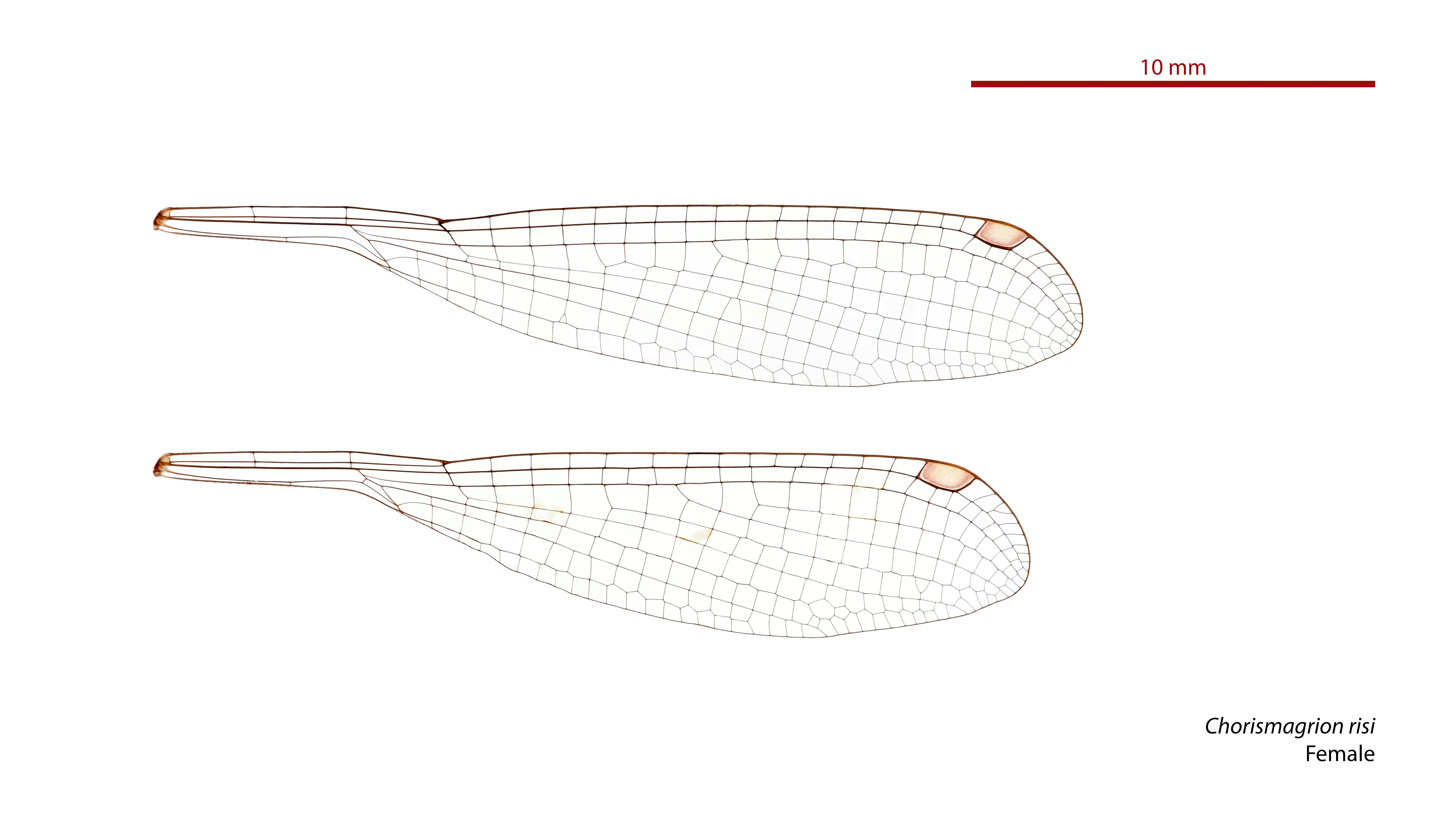
Female Chorismagrion risi wings

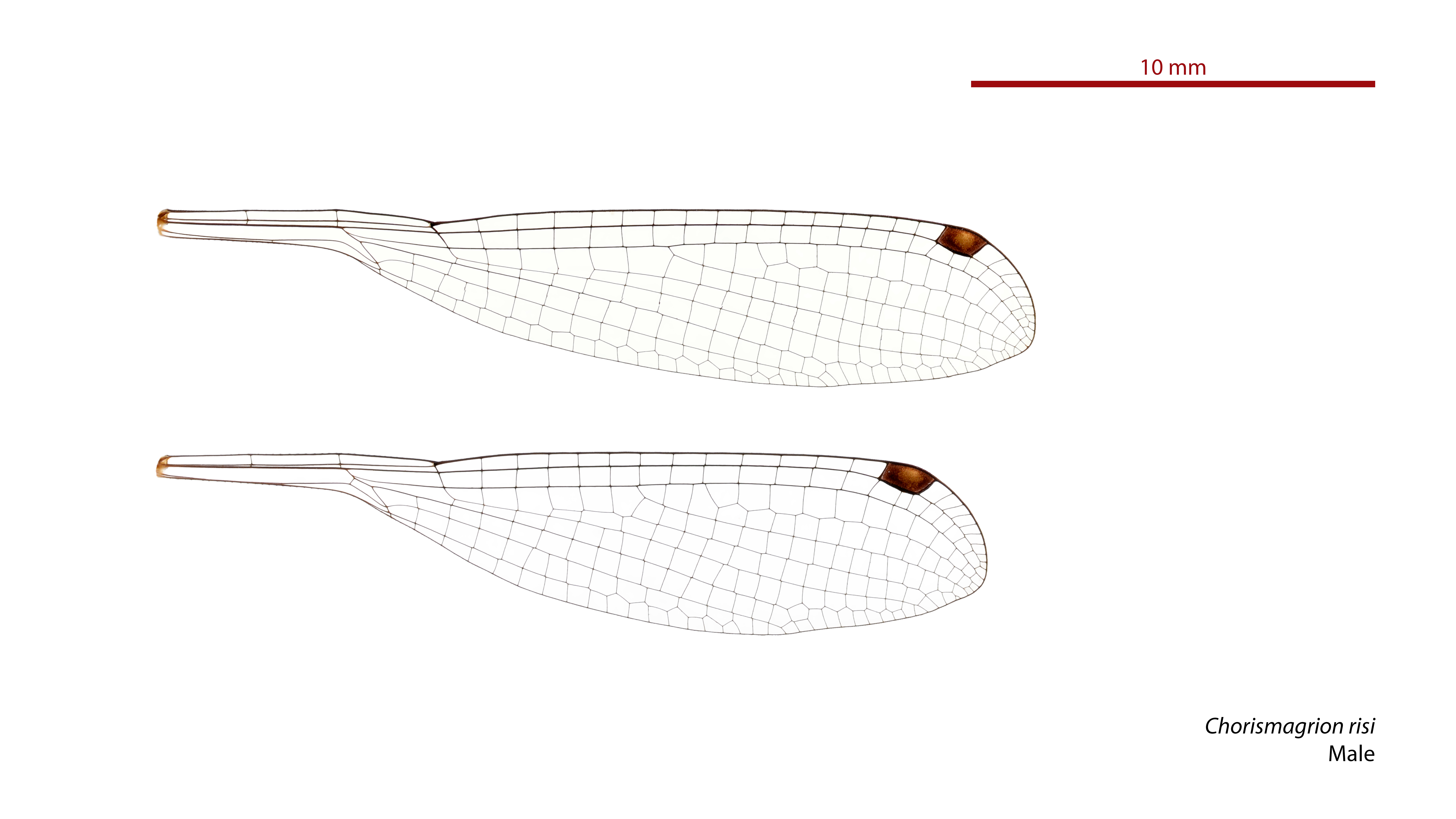
Male Chorismagrion risi wings

== See also ==
- List of Odonata species of Australia
