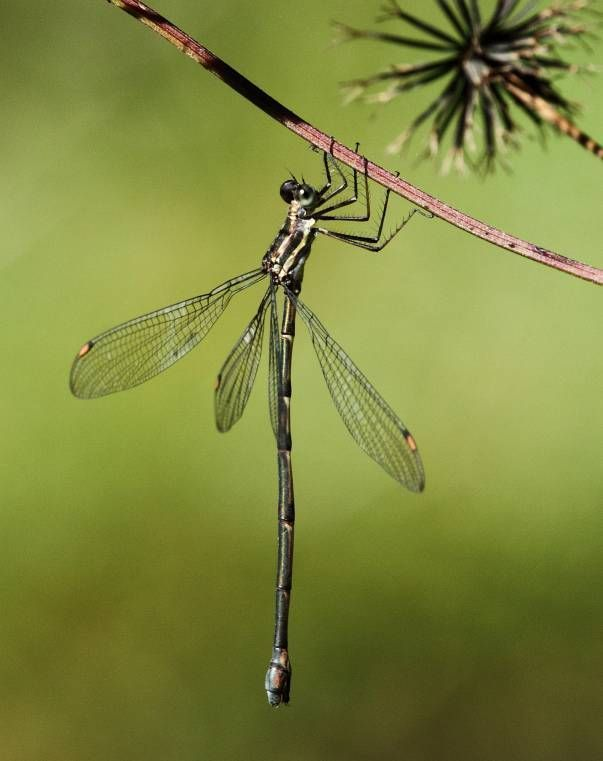
- Female

Conservation status
- Least Concern (IUCN 3.1)

Scientific classification
- Domain: Eukaryota
- Kingdom: Animalia
- Phylum: Arthropoda
- Class: Insecta
- Order: Odonata
- Suborder: Zygoptera
- Family: Synlestidae
- Genus: Chlorolestes
- Species: C. tessellatus

Binomial name
- Chlorolestes tessellatus Burmeister, 1839

= Chlorolestes tessellatus =

Species of damselfly

Chlorolestes tessellatus, the forest malachite or mosaic sylph is a species of damselfly in the family Synlestidae. It is endemic to South Africa. This shade-loving species is found at seeps and streams in forests and wooded valleys.

It is 47–57 mm (1.9–2.2 in) long with a wingspan of 55–72 mm (2.2–2.8 in). Males and females are similar; the thorax and abdomen are metallic-green aging to coppery brown. The thorax has contrasting yellow antehumeral stripes; these are more broad than those of the similar Mountain Malachite.
