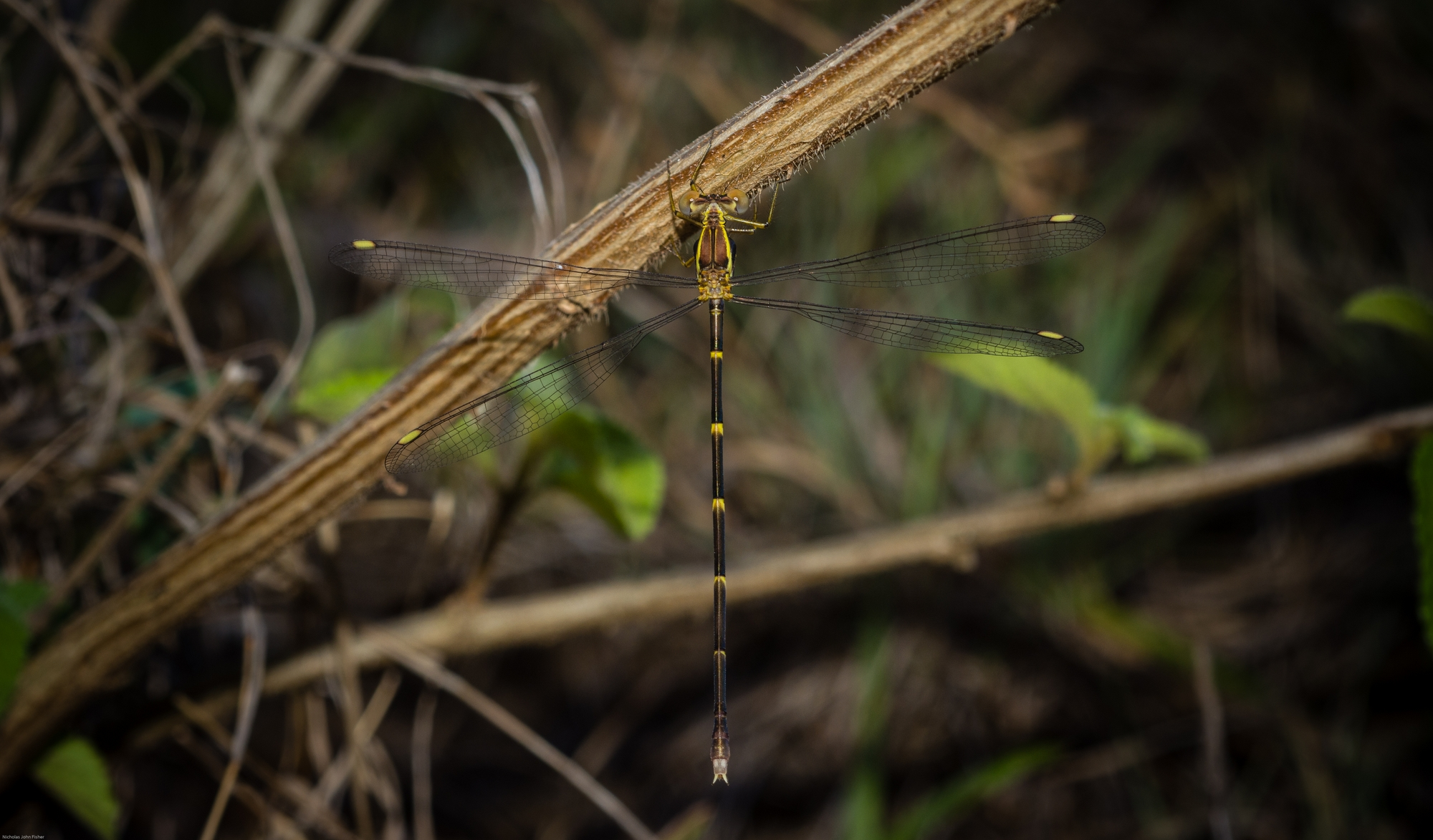
- Episynlestes albicaudus

Conservation status
- Least Concern (IUCN 3.1)

Scientific classification
- Kingdom: Animalia
- Phylum: Arthropoda
- Clade: Pancrustacea
- Class: Insecta
- Order: Odonata
- Suborder: Zygoptera
- Family: Synlestidae
- Genus: Episynlestes
- Species: E. albicaudus

Binomial name
- Episynlestes albicaudus (Tillyard, 1913)

Synonyms
- Synlestes albicauda Tillyard, 1913

= Episynlestes albicaudus =

Southern whitetip

Species of damselfly

Episynlestes albicaudus is a species of Australian damselfly in the family Synlestidae, commonly known as a southern whitetip. It is endemic to south-eastern Queensland and north-eastern New South Wales, where it inhabits streams and pools in rainforests.

Episynlestes albicaudus is a large, very slender damselfly, coloured a dull bronze-black with white markings. It often perches with its wings outspread.

== Taxonomy ==
The species was described by Robin Tillyard in 1913 as Synlestes albicauda. It is now placed in the genus Episynlestes, and the species name has been adjusted to albicaudus to match the masculine gender of the genus.

== Etymology ==
The genus name Episynlestes is derived from the Greek ἐπί (epi, "upon", "over" or "additional to"), combined with Synlestes, a genus name derived from the Greek σύν (syn, "together") and Lestes, itself derived from the Greek λῃστής (lēstēs, "robber").

The species name albicaudus is derived from the Latin albus ("white") and cauda ("tail"), referring to its long white appendages.

== Gallery ==
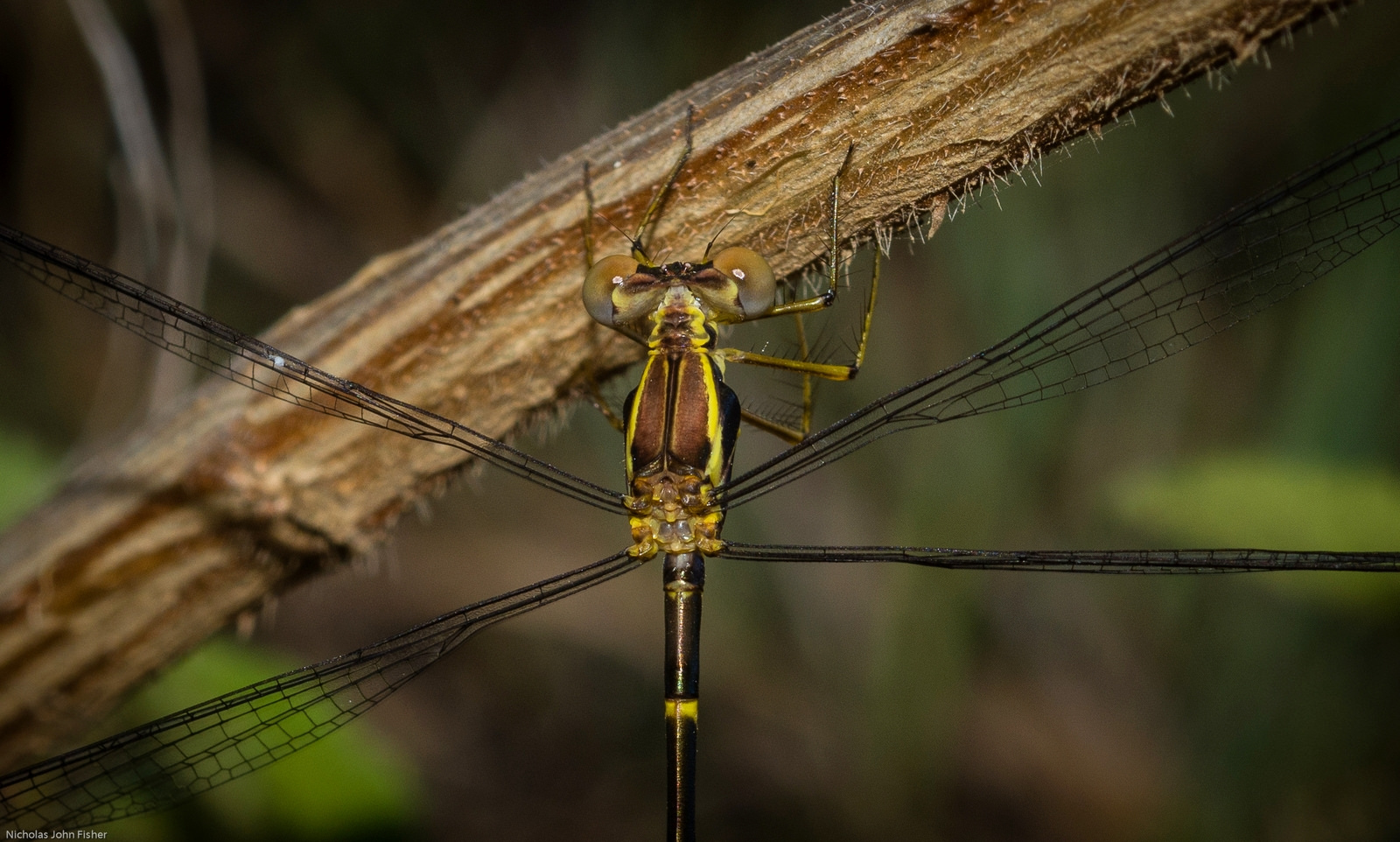
Detail of body

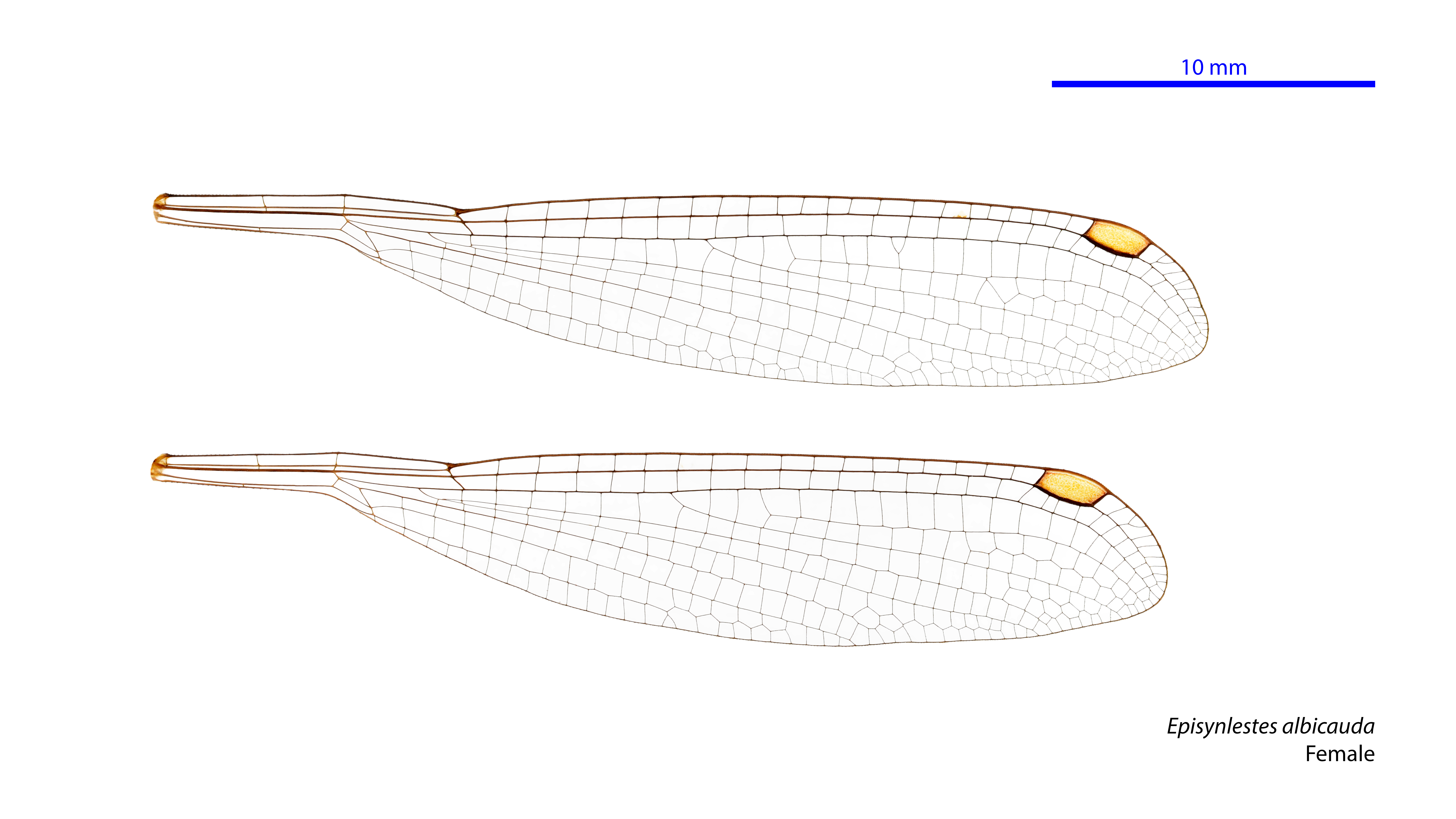
Female wings

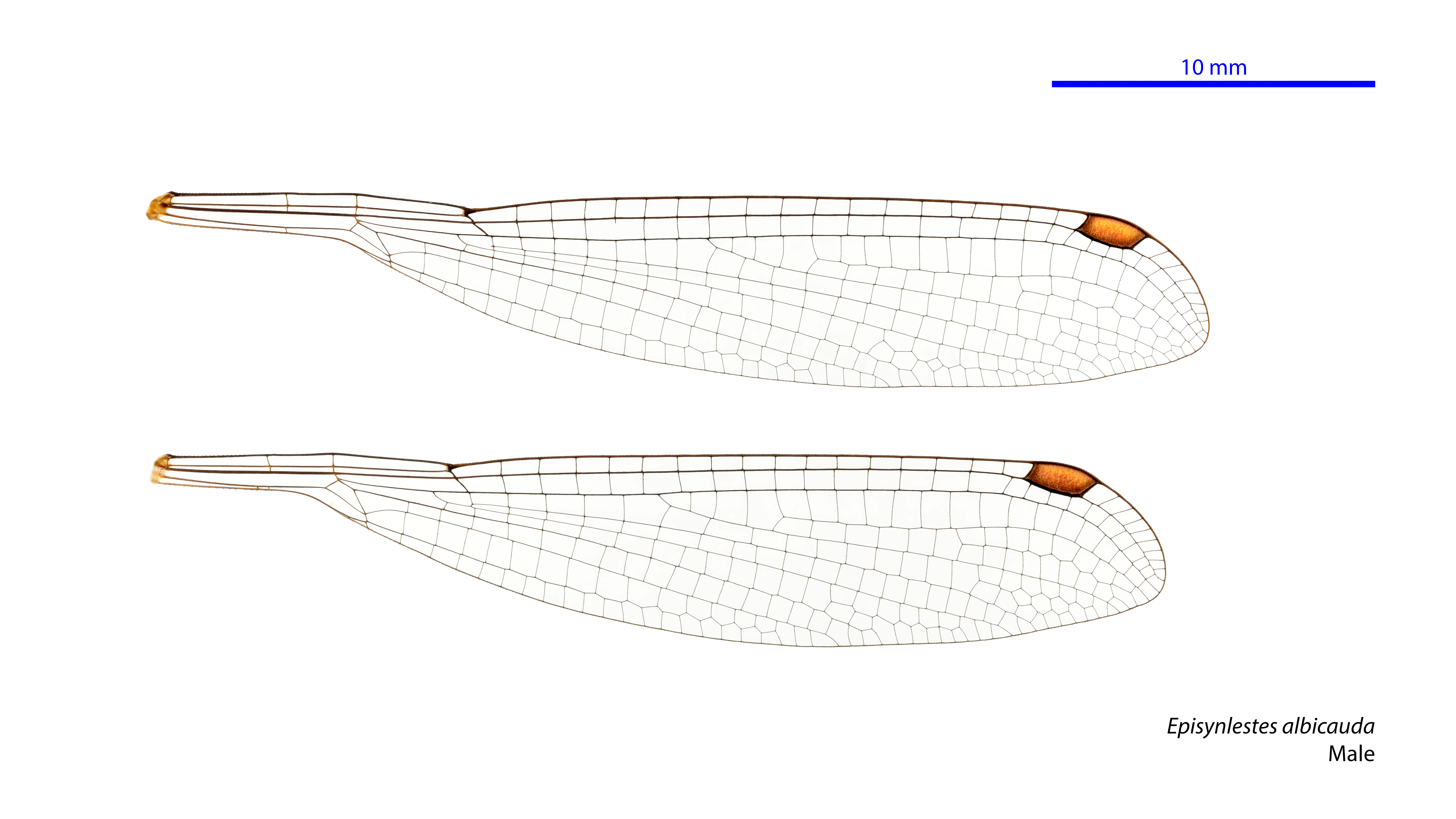
Male wings

== See also ==
- List of Odonata species of Australia
