= Sinolestes =

Conservation status
- Least Concern (IUCN 3.1)

Scientific classification
- Kingdom: Animalia
- Phylum: Arthropoda
- Class: Insecta
- Order: Odonata
- Suborder: Zygoptera
- Family: Synlestidae
- Genus: Sinolestes; Needham, 1930
- Species: S. editus

Binomial name
- Sinolestes editus Needham, 1930

Synonyms
- Sinolestes ornatus Needham, 1930; Sinolestes truncata Needham, 1930

Genus of insects

Sinolestes is a genus of damselfly in the family Synlestidae. It is monotypic, the sole species being Sinolestes editus. It is found in southeastern China (Zhejiang, Fujian, Guangdong, and Guangxi provinces), Taiwan, and probably northern Vietnam.

== Description ==
The abdomen measures 52–58 mm (2.0–2.3 in) in males and 54 mm (2.1 in) in females. Male has deep metallic green body with pale-yellow markings. The head is posteriorly yellow. They eyes are pale-green. The pronotum is laterally yellow. The anterior side of the synthorax has broad longitudinal humeral stripe; the lateral side of synthorax has yellow metepisternum and metepimeron. The wings are transparent or with dark cross-bands of different widths (specimens with different wing types were originally considered to represent distinct species, but are now regarded as intraspecific variation). The pterostigma is yellowish-brown, darkening with age and ultimately becoming totally black. The legs are black. The abdomen is dark with some yellow lateral markings. Female is similar to male but the yellow abdominal markings are more developed and the pterostigma remains pale yellowish-brown when mature.

== Habitat ==
In Taiwan, Sinolestes editus occurs near small puddles in semi-shaded brooks in mountain forests at about 1,000 m (3,300 ft) above sea level. In China, the altitudinal range is 220–1,900 m (720–6,230 ft).

== Ecology and behaviour ==
Males guard their breeding sites, perching on branches or tall grasses around small puddles. The eggs are laid inside the stems of Polygonum chinense and Hydrangea angustipetala some 1–2 meters above the puddle.
