= Episynlestes cristatus =

Tropical whitetip

Conservation status
- Least Concern (IUCN 3.1)

Scientific classification
- Kingdom: Animalia
- Phylum: Arthropoda
- Clade: Pancrustacea
- Class: Insecta
- Order: Odonata
- Suborder: Zygoptera
- Family: Synlestidae
- Genus: Episynlestes
- Species: E. cristatus

Binomial name
- Episynlestes cristatus Watson & Moulds, 1977

Species of damselfly

Episynlestes cristatus is a species of Australian damselfly in the family Synlestidae, commonly known as a tropical whitetip. It is endemic to north-eastern Queensland, where it inhabits streams in rainforest.

Episynlestes cristatus is a large, very slender damselfly, coloured a dull bronze-black with white markings. It often perches with its wings outspread.

== Etymology ==
The genus name Episynlestes is derived from the Greek ἐπί (epi, "upon", "over" or "additional to"), combined with Synlestes, a genus name derived from the Greek σύν (syn, "together") and Lestes, itself derived from the Greek λῃστής (lēstēs, "robber").

The species name cristatus is Latin for "crested" or "with a crest", referring to a crest of black bristles on its appendages.

== Gallery ==
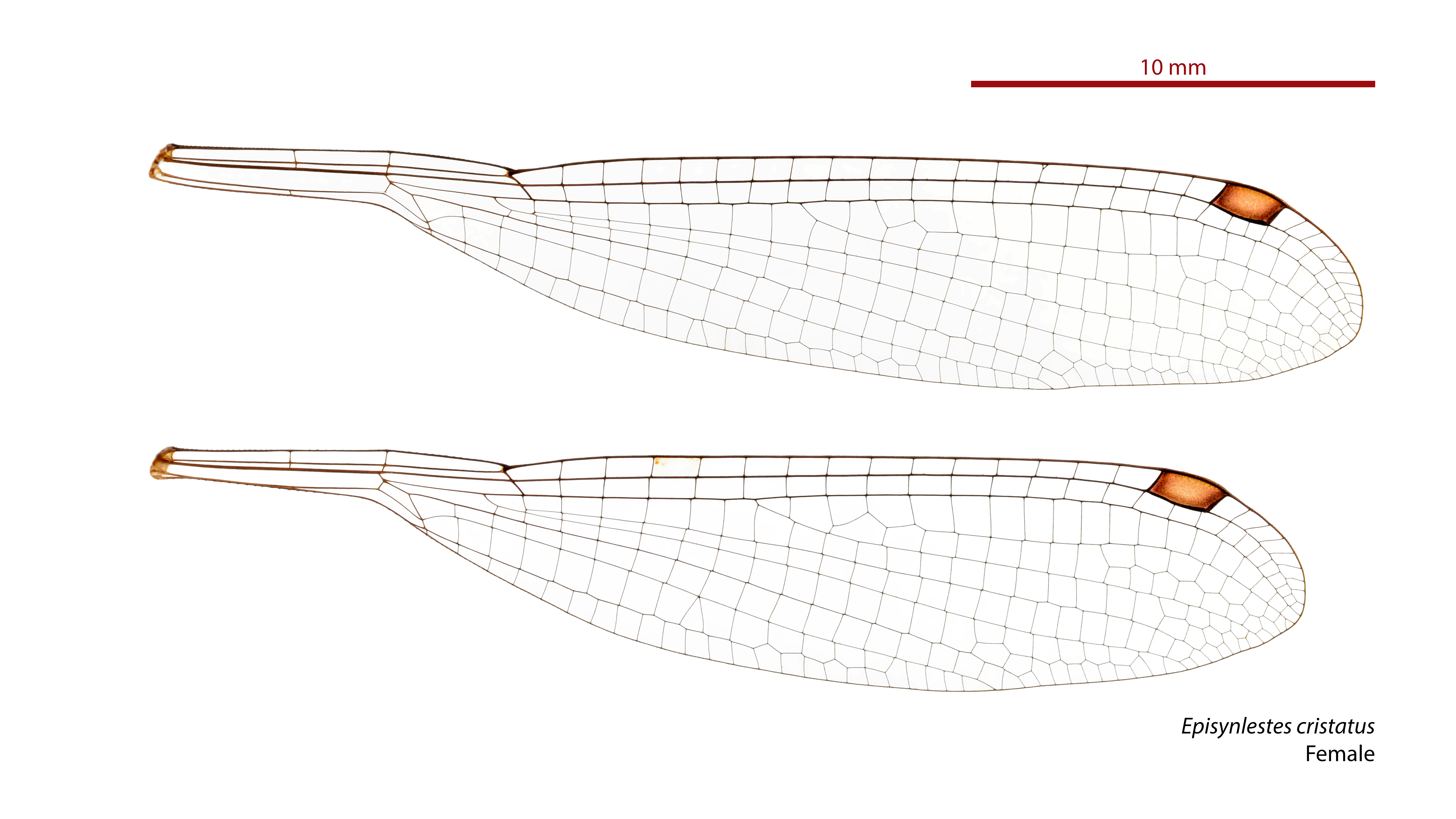
Female wings

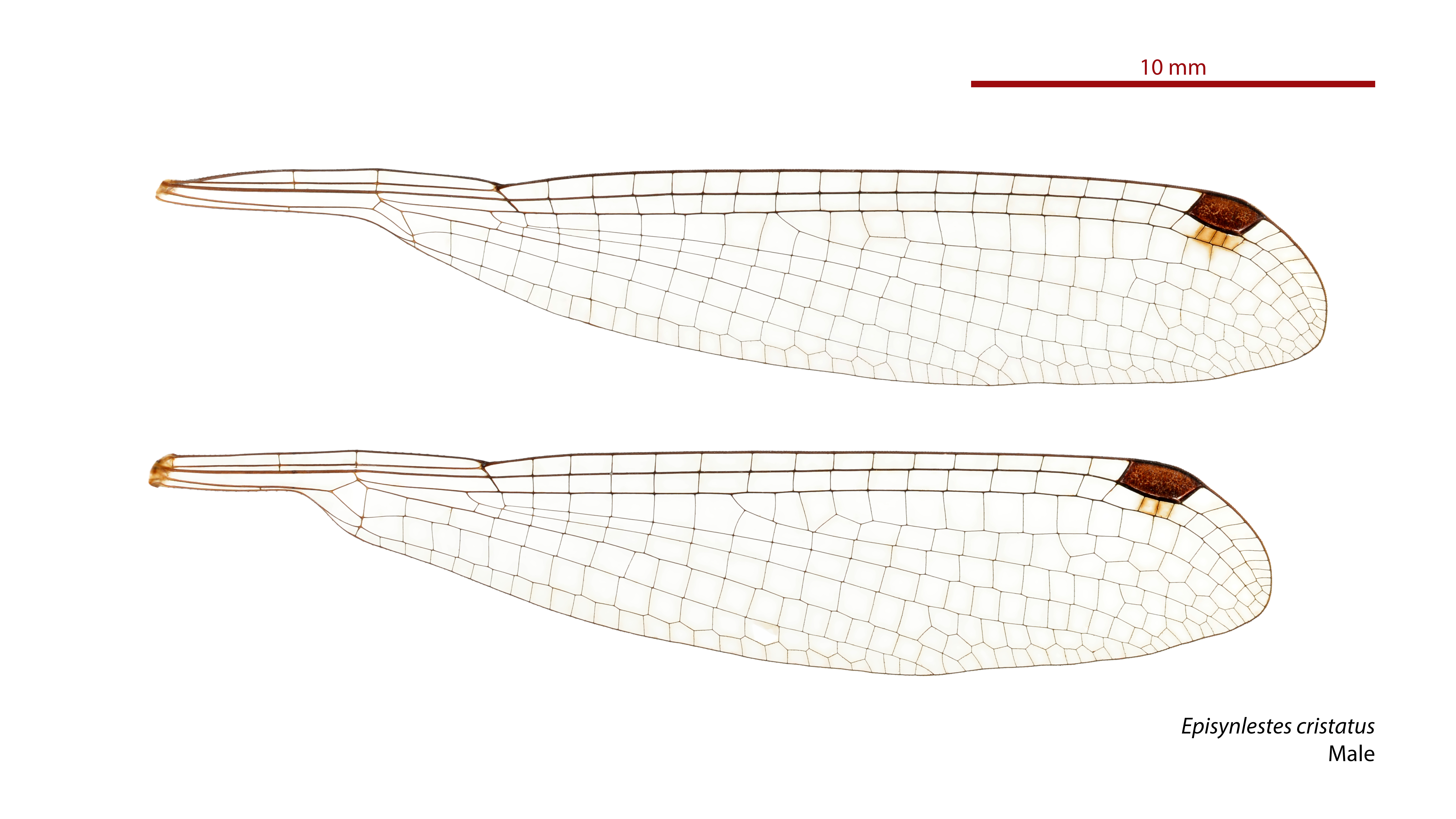
Male wings

== See also ==
- List of Odonata species of Australia
