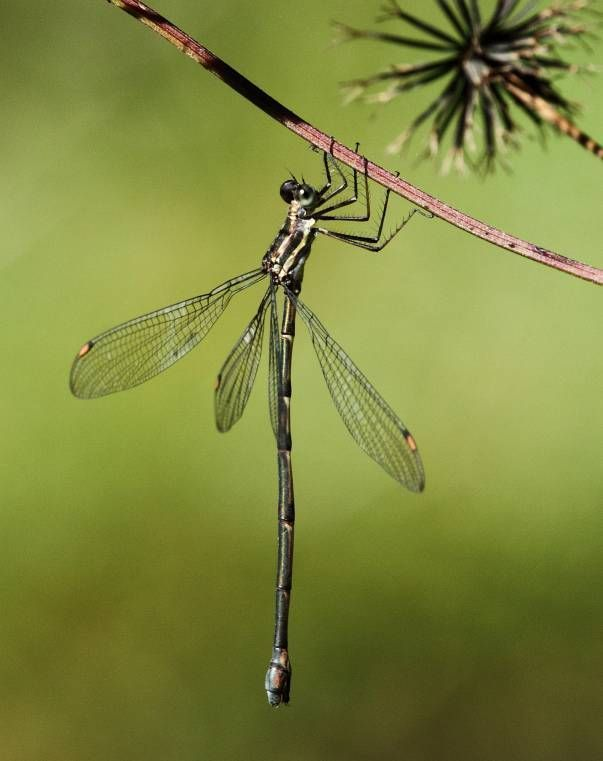
- Chlorolestes tessellatus

Scientific classification
- Kingdom: Animalia
- Phylum: Arthropoda
- Clade: Pancrustacea
- Class: Insecta
- Order: Odonata
- Suborder: Zygoptera
- Superfamily: Lestoidea
- Family: Synlestidae; Tillyard, 1917
- Distribution of Synlestidae

Synonyms
- Chlorolestidae Fraser, 1951

= Synlestidae =

Family of damselflies

Synlestidae is a family of damselflies commonly known as sylphs or malachites. The family includes nine living genera distributed across sub-Saharan Africa, Asia, Australia and the Caribbean. Members are typically large, slender damselflies with metallic green, bronze or black coloration and pale markings, and many species rest with their wings partly spread.

== Description ==
Most synlestids inhabit streams and rivers, particularly in forested habitats. The larvae are aquatic and possess short, vertically held caudal gills.

== Taxonomic history ==
Tillyard established Synlestinae in 1917 for the Australian genus Synlestes. He subsequently recognised Synlestidae at family rank in 1926, a classification retained by Tillyard and Fraser in 1938.

In 1951, Fraser introduced Chlorolestidae, placing Synlestes and related genera in the subfamily Chlorolestinae. The name Chlorolestidae subsequently became widely used, but in 1985 Theischinger and Watson explicitly recognised the priority of Synlestidae Tillyard, 1917 over Chlorolestidae. This treatment was followed in later classifications.

The limits of Synlestidae have subsequently been refined through morphological and molecular studies, and its placement is currently within the superfamily Lestoidea.

== Genera ==
The following genera are currently placed in Synlestidae:

- Chlorolestes Selys, 1862
- Chorismagrion Morton, 1914
- Ecchlorolestes Barnard, 1937
- Episynlestes Kennedy, 1920
- Megalestes Selys, 1862
- Nubiolestes Fraser, 1945
- Phylolestes Christiansen, 1947
- Sinolestes Needham, 1930
- Synlestes Selys, 1868

== Fossil record ==
Synlestidae has a modest fossil record extending from the Cretaceous to the Eocene, indicating a wider historical distribution than that of its living representatives.

=== Fossil genera ===
The following fossil genera are currently placed in Synlestidae:

- †Albertalestes Jouault and Nel, 2023
- †Cretaphylolestes Huang et al., 2021
- †Gaurimacia Vasilenko, 2005
- †Inacayalestes Petrulevičius, 2015
- †Madres Petrulevičius, 2018
- †Palaeophylolestes Doriath-Döhler et al., 2023

== Etymology ==
The family name Synlestidae is derived from the type genus Synlestes, with the standard zoological suffix -idae used for animal families.

The genus name Synlestes is derived from the Greek σύν (syn, "together"), combined with Lestes, a genus name derived from the Greek λῃστής (lēstēs, "robber"), indicating resemblance to that genus.
