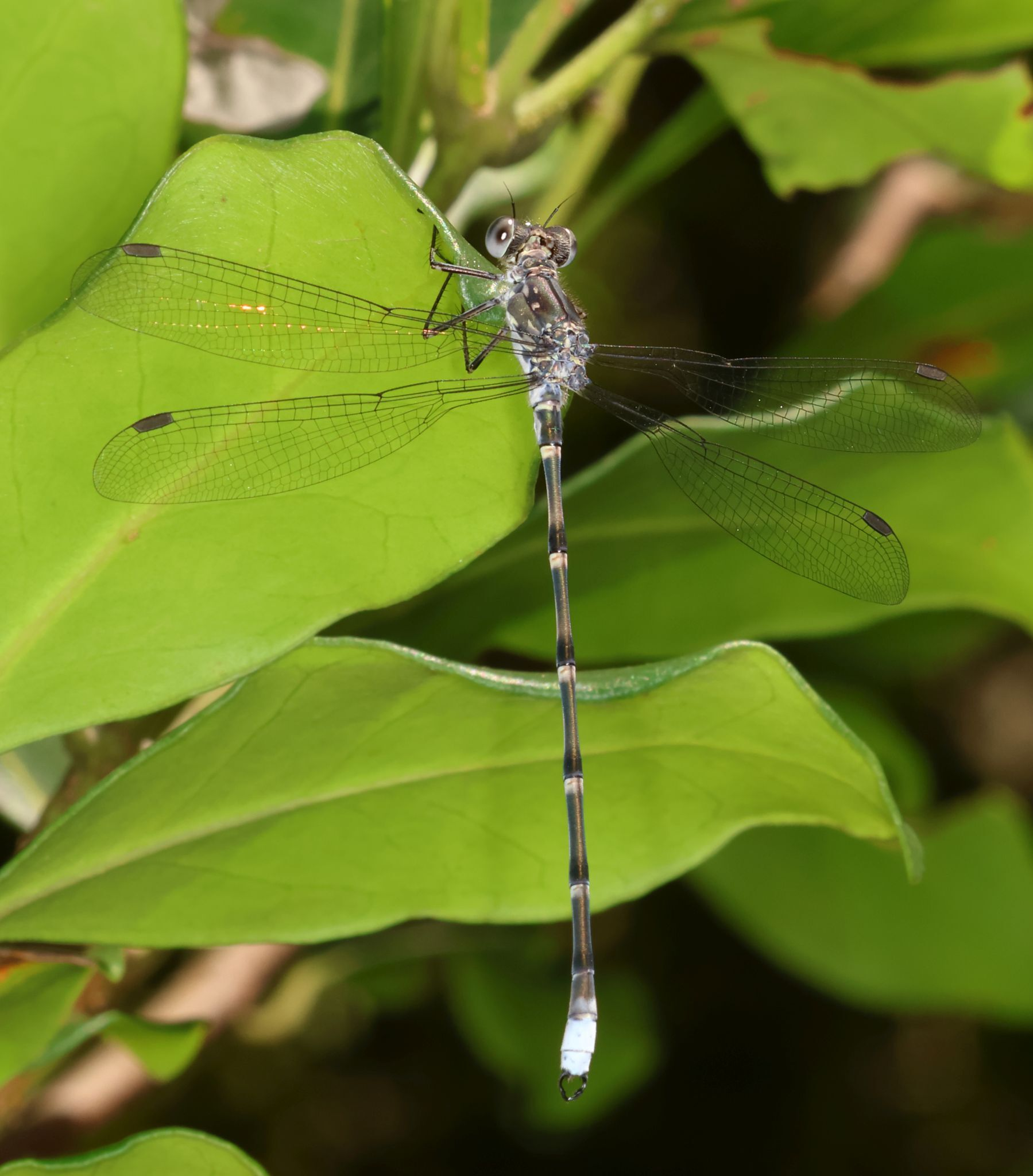
- Male E. peringueyi
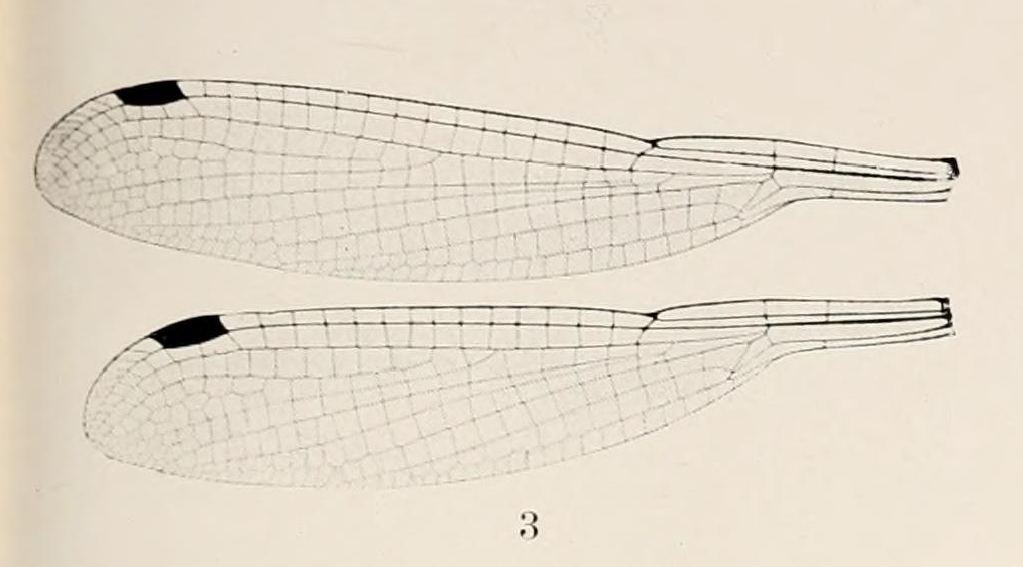
- Wings of E. peringueyi ♂ from Ceres, South Africa.

Conservation status
- Near Threatened (IUCN 3.1)

Scientific classification
- Kingdom: Animalia
- Phylum: Arthropoda
- Clade: Pancrustacea
- Class: Insecta
- Order: Odonata
- Suborder: Zygoptera
- Family: Synlestidae
- Genus: Ecchlorolestes
- Species: E. peringueyi

Binomial name
- Ecchlorolestes peringueyi (Ris, 1921)

= Ecchlorolestes peringueyi =

Species of damselfly

Ecchlorolestes peringueyi is a species of damselfly in the family Synlestidae. It is commonly known as the marbled malachite.

== Description ==
This large damselfly earns its common name from its dark metallic, cryptic colouration, which perfectly camouflages it against the mottled, lichen-covered boulders upon which it habitually sits. Its body is primarily black, but features brown markings along its long, slender abdomen, it is particularly at the joints between segments, and is bluish, slate-grey colouring at the tip.

== Geographical range ==
The marbled malachite is endemic to South Africa. It is only known from protected areas within the Cape Fold Mountains of the Western Cape.

== Habitat ==
Its natural habitat is rivers. It is also found along clear, shallow streams with an abundance of large, lichen-covered boulders. Two populations of marbled malachites exist at high elevation locations over 1,000 metres above sea level, while a third population is at 400 metres above sea level.

== Biology ==
There is virtually nothing known about the marbled malachite's reproductive biology, life history patterns or feeding behaviour.

== Threats ==
Marbled malachites were probably never widespread or abundant, but early records nevertheless reveal that it was once found at many more localities than it is today. Despite its historical declines, however, the current population of this species appears to be stable, both in range and size, and habitat destruction, mostly for plantation forestry, has largely subsided. Even so, this damselfly species remains vulnerable to several threats that have the potential to impact dramatically on such small and specialized populations. Alien invasive trees, which shade out the habitat, are considered one of the most pervasive and significant threats facing specialized, endemic South African dragonflies and damselflies. Introduced trout pose a serious threat to endemic dragonflies and damselflies through predation.

== Conservation ==
The marbled malachite occurs within protected areas. A massive national rehabilitation programme (Working with Water Programme) began in 1995 with the aim of eradicating invasive alien plants in South Africa. The programme has been a fantastic success story, with other dragonflies and damselflies like Pseudagrion newtoni that were presumed to be extinct being rediscovered along river stretches where invasive alien trees were removed and the natural vegetation reestablished. This programme has also greatly benefited the marbled malachite, but it is imperative that there is no further encroachment of plantation forestry. It is important that populations are regularly monitored to make sure that they are remaining stable. However, for the time being, this enigmatic damselfly is thought relatively safe from the threat of extinction.
