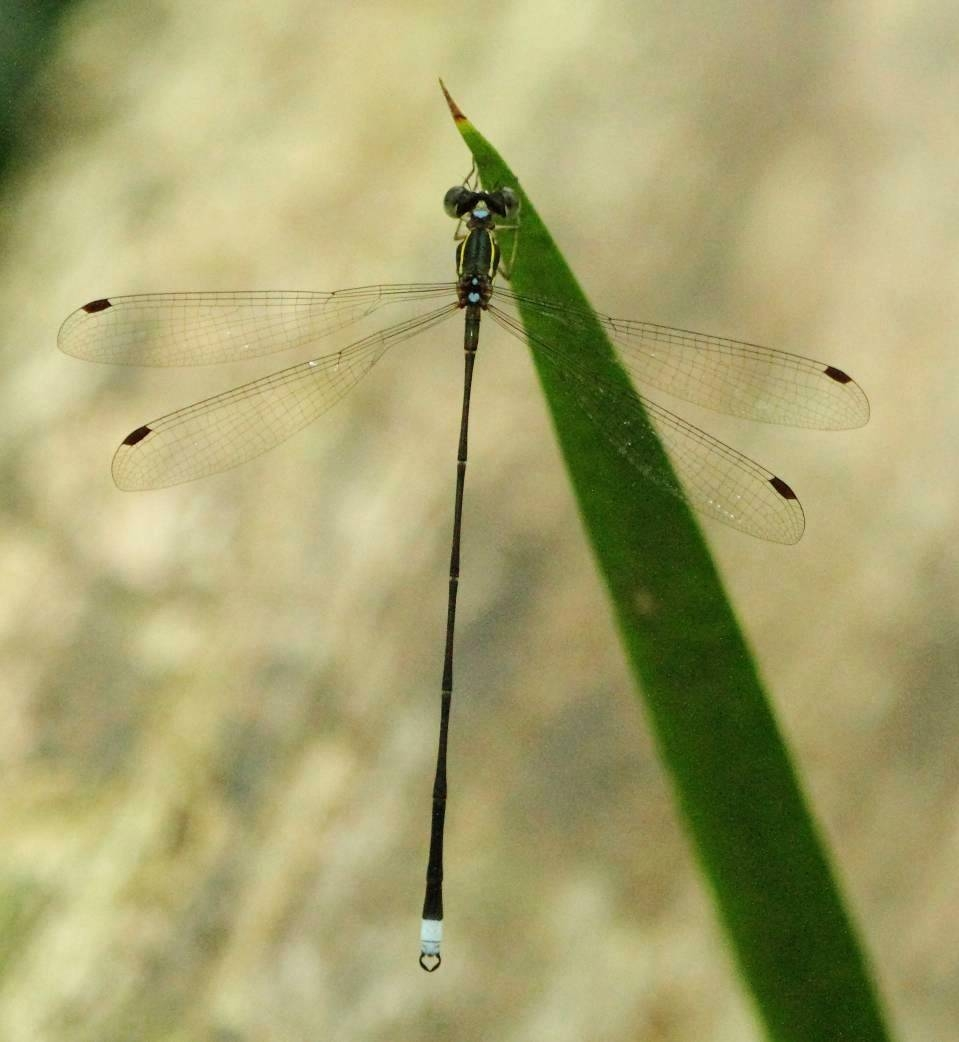
- Ecchlorolestes nylephtha

Scientific classification
- Kingdom: Animalia
- Phylum: Arthropoda
- Clade: Pancrustacea
- Class: Insecta
- Order: Odonata
- Suborder: Zygoptera
- Family: Synlestidae
- Genus: Ecchlorolestes; Barnard, 1937

= Ecchlorolestes =

Genus of damselflies

Ecchlorolestes is a genus of large damselflies in the family Synlestidae.

The genus contains only two species:

- Ecchlorolestes nylephtha Barnard, 1937 - Queen Malachite
- Ecchlorolestes peringueyi (Ris, 1921) - Marbled Malachite
