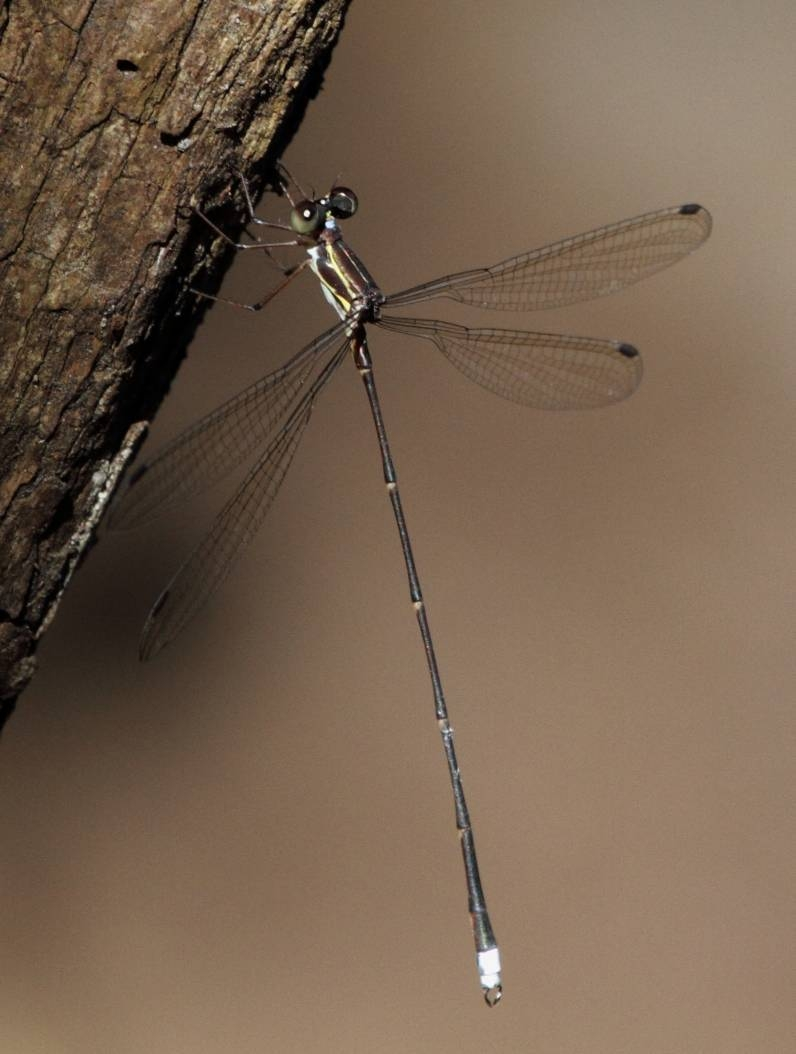
- Male

Conservation status
- Near Threatened (IUCN 3.1)

Scientific classification
- Kingdom: Animalia
- Phylum: Arthropoda
- Class: Insecta
- Order: Odonata
- Suborder: Zygoptera
- Family: Synlestidae
- Genus: Ecchlorolestes
- Species: E. nylephtha

Binomial name
- Ecchlorolestes nylephtha Barnard, 1937

Synonyms
- Chlorolestes nylephtha

= Ecchlorolestes nylephtha =

Species of damselfly

Ecchlorolestes nylephtha is a species of damselfly in the family Synlestidae known commonly as the queen malachite. It is endemic to South Africa, where it is known only from the Eastern Cape and Western Cape provinces.

This slender malachite is 47–55 mm long with a wingspan of 57–61 mm. Males and females are similar; the thorax and abdomen are metallic-green to bronze, with yellow antehumeral stripes on the thorax. Mature males, however, have a bright pruinose-blue colouring on the collar, between the wings and on the last two segments of the abdomen. Both sexes can be distinguished from malachites of the genus Chlorolestes by their wing venation.

This damselfly lives in shady forest habitat on fern-lined streambanks. Loss of this natural forest habitat is a potential threat to the species, but populations are currently thought to be stable.
