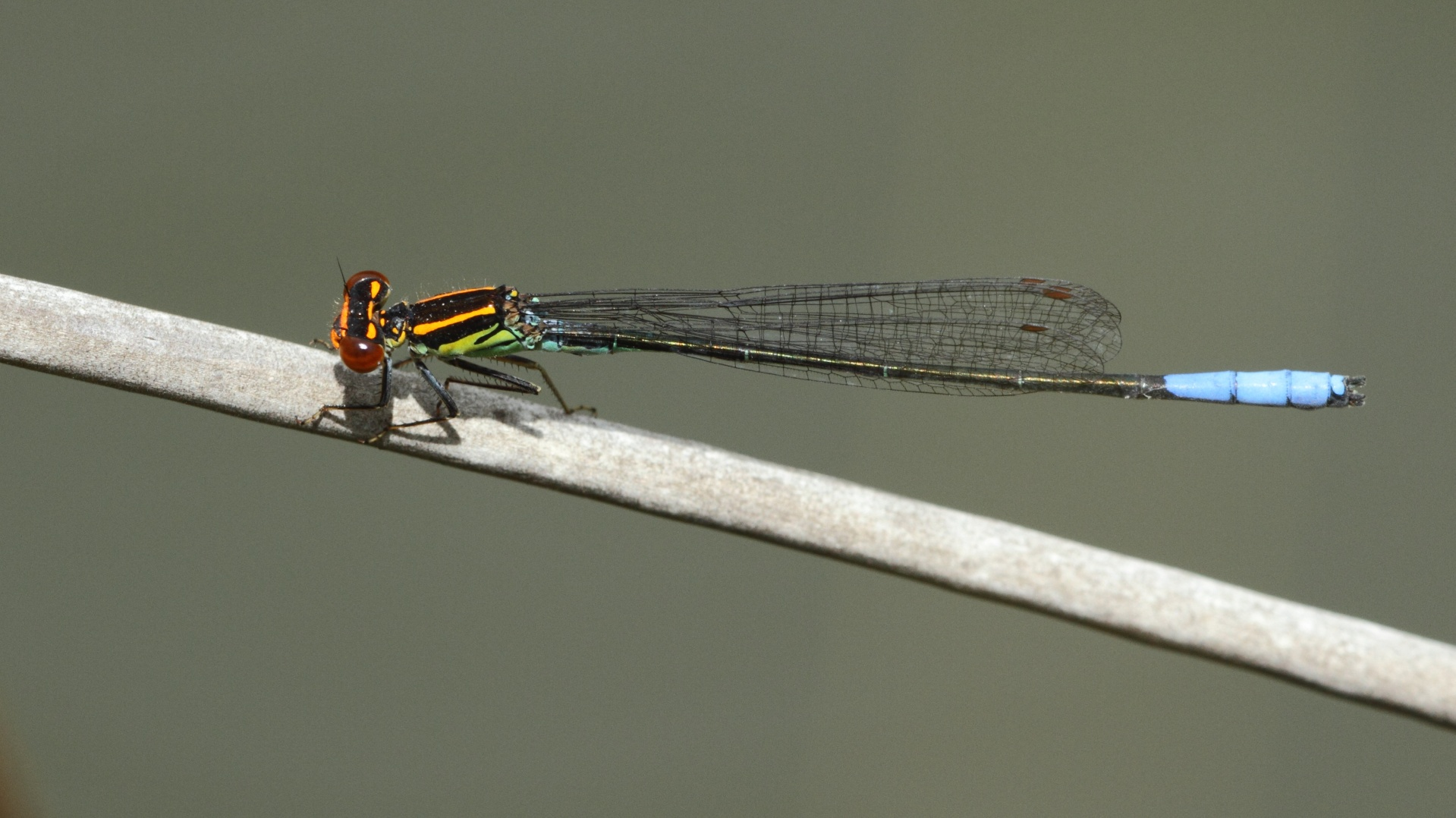
- Male

Conservation status
- Vulnerable (IUCN 3.1)

Scientific classification
- Kingdom: Animalia
- Phylum: Arthropoda
- Clade: Pancrustacea
- Class: Insecta
- Order: Odonata
- Suborder: Zygoptera
- Family: Coenagrionidae
- Genus: Pseudagrion
- Species: P. newtoni

Binomial name
- Pseudagrion newtoni Pinhey, 1962

= Pseudagrion newtoni =

Harlequin sprite

Species of damselfly

Pseudagrion newtoni, the harlequin sprite, is a species of damselfly in the family Coenagrionidae.

== Distribution ==
This sprite is endemic to South Africa, where it is rare and localised in KwaZulu-Natal and Mpumalanga.

== Habitat ==
Grass-lined or sedge-lined streams in hilly or mountainous country. Much of this riparian habitat has been transformed by cropping, trampling by livestock and invasion by shrubs and trees. The harlequin sprite is, therefore, no longer found in much of its former range, and its survival is threatened.

== Description ==
Mature male: The face is bright orange, and the top of the head is black with bright orange postocular spots joined by a line of the same colour. The eyes are reddish-brown above and yellow-brown below. The upper thorax is black with orange antehumeral stripes and the sides are green to blue. The abdomen is black above, except for S7 to S10, which are bright blue above. The wings are clear with reddish-brown pterostigmata.

== Identification ==
This species is similar to Pseudagrion hageni, but Pseudagrion newtoni is smaller, and S7 is black in P. hageni. Pseudagrion newtoni also has a diagnostic bright blue heart-shaped marking on S10. Preferred habitats are also different: Pseudagrion newtoni is found in grasslands rather than wooded country.

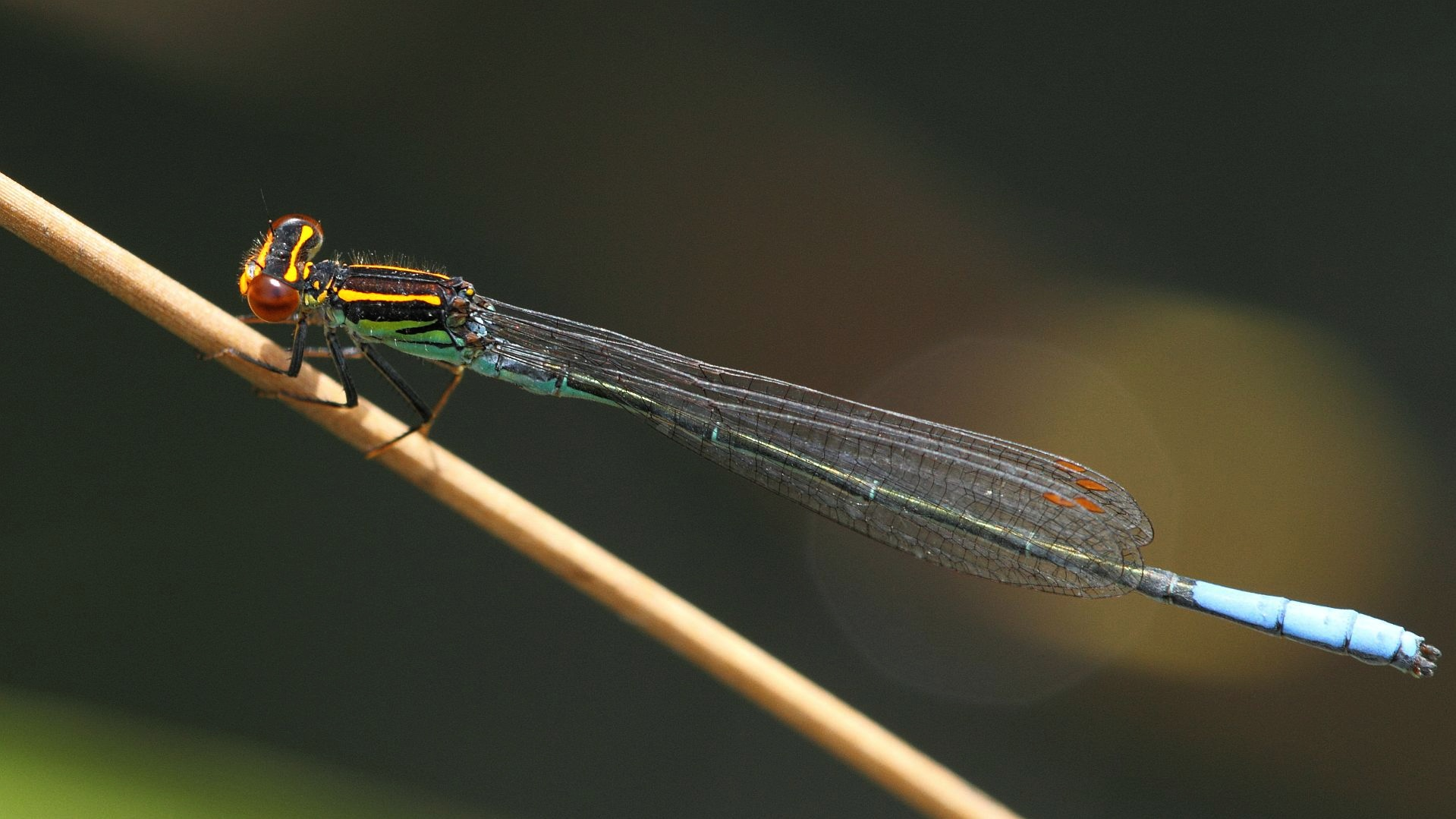
Male

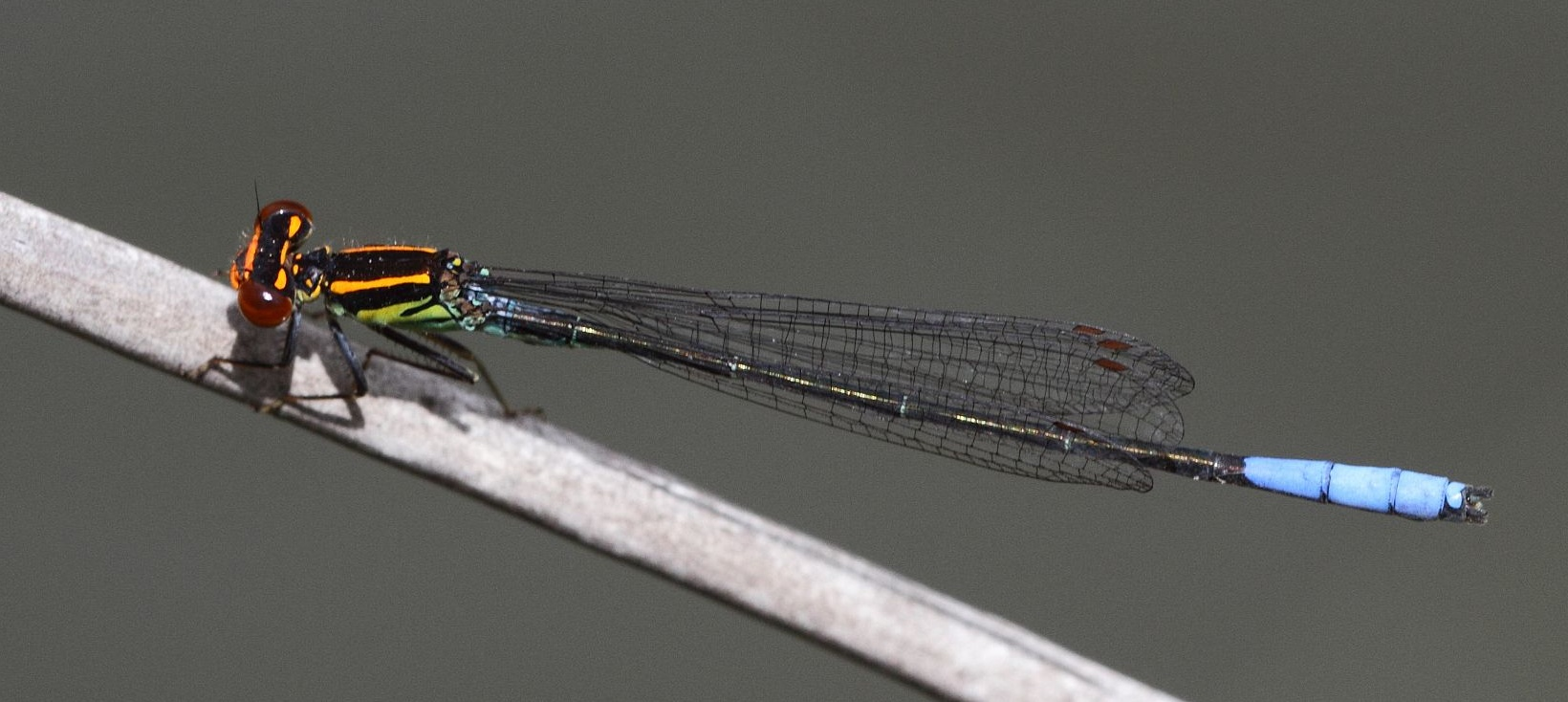
Male

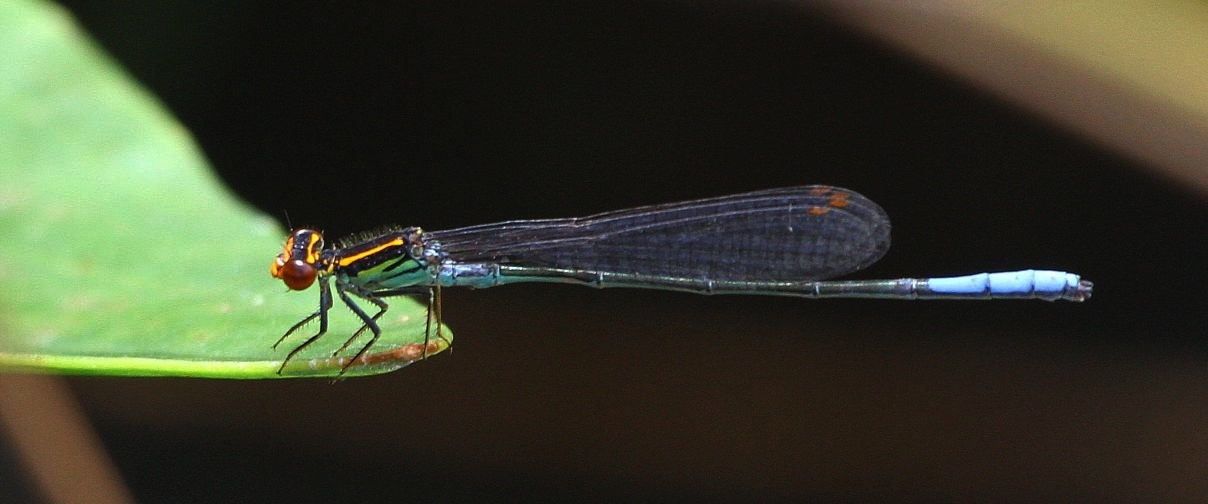
Male

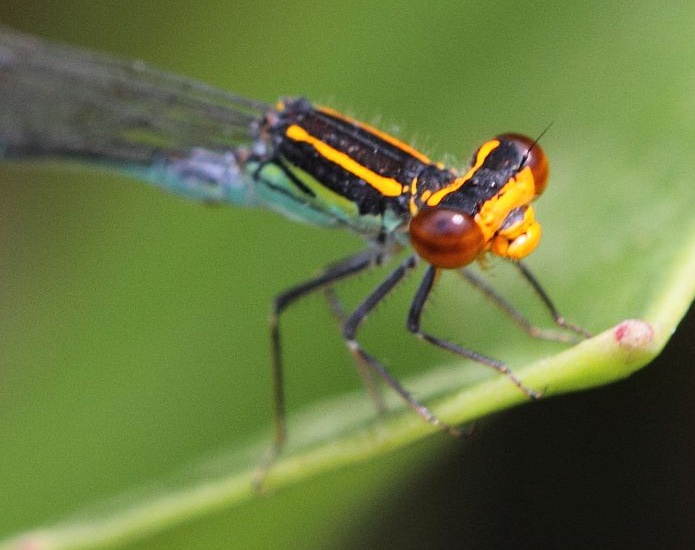
Male; head and thorax

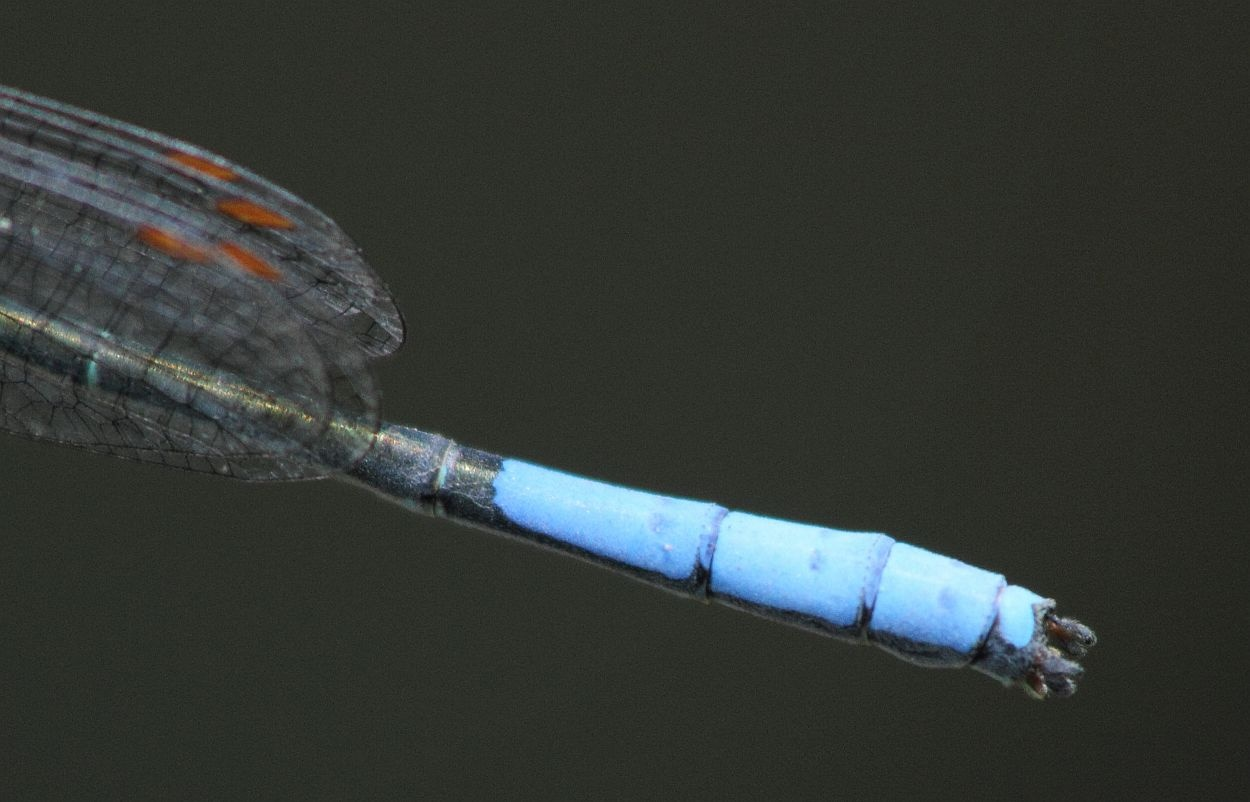
Male; abdomen (S6-S10)
