= P. africana =

P. africana may refer to:

- Parachanna africana, a species of fish in the family Channidae
- Paralomis africana, a king crab species found off the coast of Namibia
- Parastrigulia africana, a species of beetle in the family Buprestidae
- Parerupa africana, a species of moth in the family Crambidae
- Parkinsonia africana, the green-hair tree, a species of flowering plant in the family Fabaceae
- Pegomastax africana, a species of heterodontosaurid dinosaur
- Phaulernis africana, a species of moth in the family Epermeniidae
- Phintella africana, a species of jumping spider in the subfamily Salticinae
- Phyllomacromia africana, a dragonfly species
- Placynthiopsis africana, a species of lichenized fungi in the family Placynthiaceae
- Plumbago africana, a species of flowering plant in the family Plumbaginaceae
- Portia africana, a species of jumping spider
- Prosopis africana, a flowering plant species found in Africa
- Prunus africana, the African Cherry, a species of tree in the family Rosaceae
- Pseudagrostistachys africana, a plant species found in Cameroon, Equatorial Guinea and Ghana
- Pseudeboda africana, a species of moth in the family Tortricidae
- Pseudophytoecia africana, a species of beetle in the family Cerambycidae

== Synonymns ==
- Parkia africana, a synonym of Parkia biglobosa
- Parochetus africana, a synonym of Parochetus communis

== See also ==
- Africana (disambiguation)
