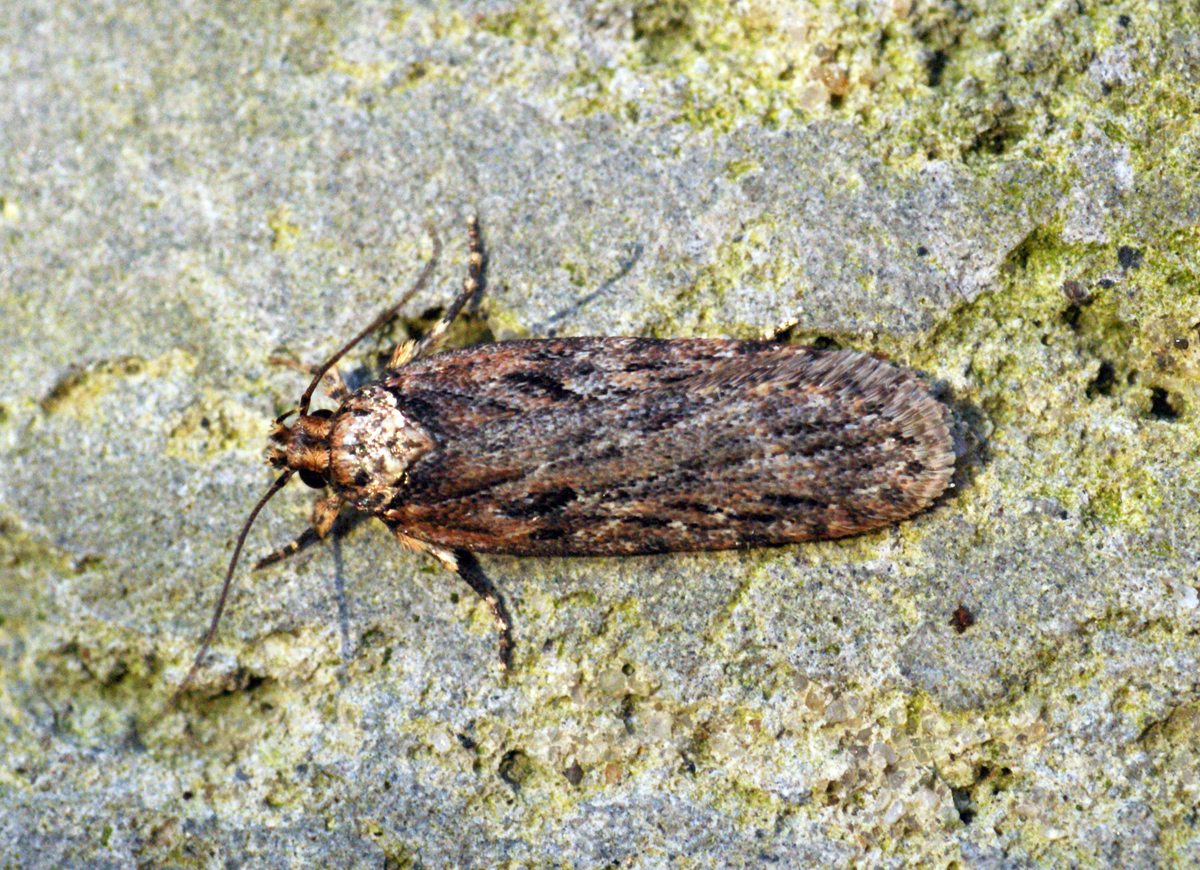
- Depressaria chaerophylli.
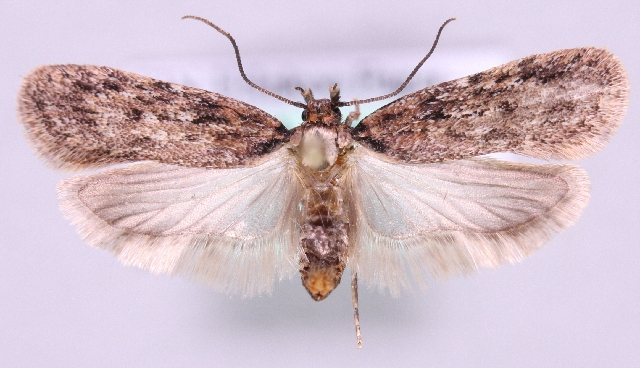
- Mounted specimen

Scientific classification
- Domain: Eukaryota
- Kingdom: Animalia
- Phylum: Arthropoda
- Class: Insecta
- Order: Lepidoptera
- Family: Depressariidae
- Genus: Depressaria
- Species: D. chaerophylli

Binomial name
- Depressaria chaerophylli Zeller, 1839

Synonyms
- Depressaria rarissimella Krulikovsky, 1907

= Depressaria chaerophylli =

Species of moth

Depressaria chaerophylli is a moth of the family Depressariidae.

== Distribution ==
This species can be found in most of Europe, the Caucasus, Libya and Palestine.

== Habitat ==
These moths mainly inhabit woodland edges, hedgerows and old lanes.

== Description ==
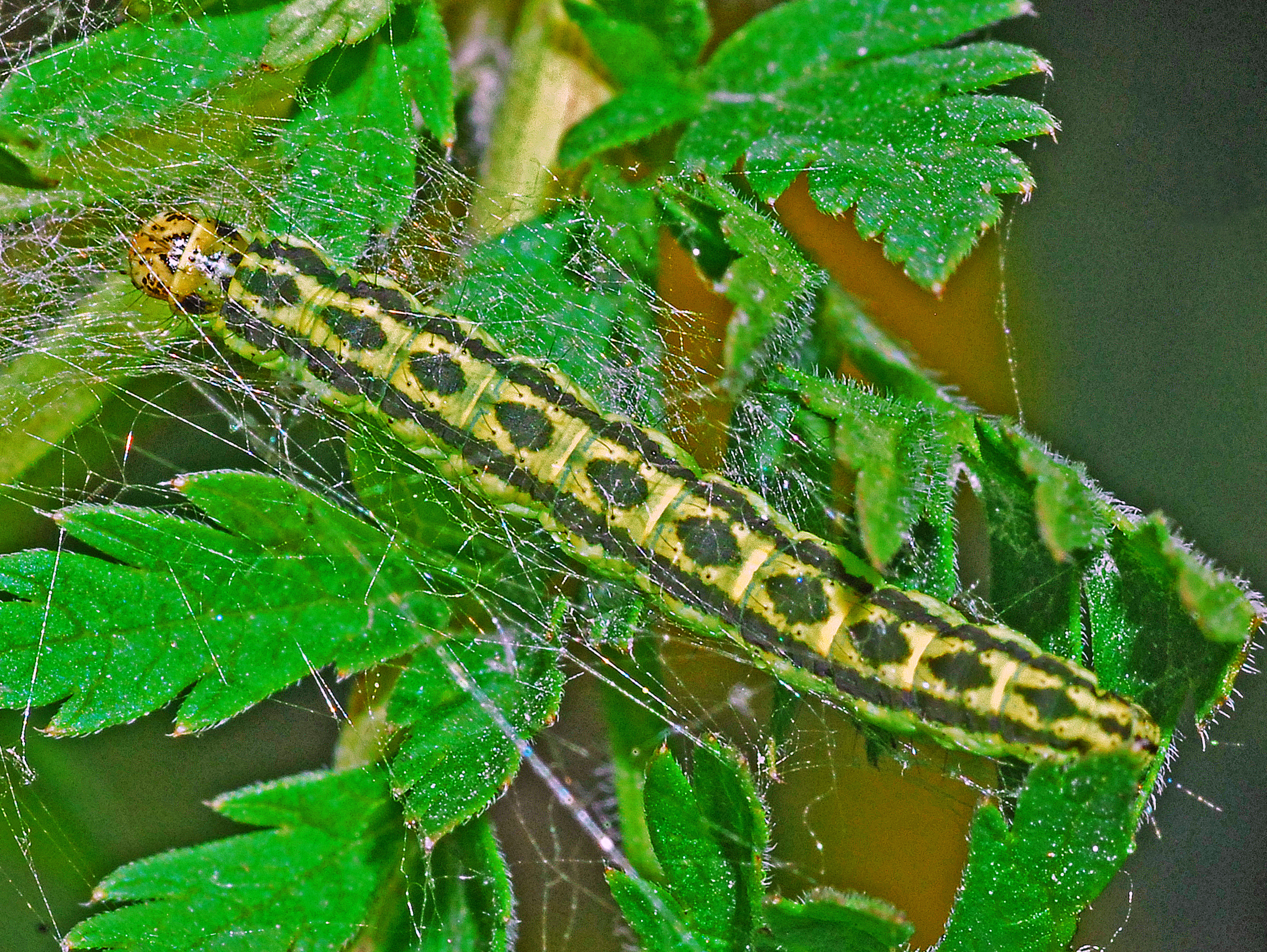
Caterpillar in the larval web

Depressaria chaerophylli has a wingspan of 19–22 mm (0.75–0.87 in). The forewings show a reddish brown ground colour, with scattered dark brown dots along the edges. On the thorax there is a large whitish area.

This species is rather similar to Depressaria depressana and Depressaria pimpinellae.

== Biology ==
Adults are on wing from July to August, and after hibernating, until April in one generation per year.

The larvae are pale yellow, with a pale orange head, with well marked brown lozenges and two brown side lines on the back,

They feed on Chaerophyllum species (hence the species name), including Chaerophyllum temulum, Chaerophyllum bulbosum and Chaerophyllum aureum.
