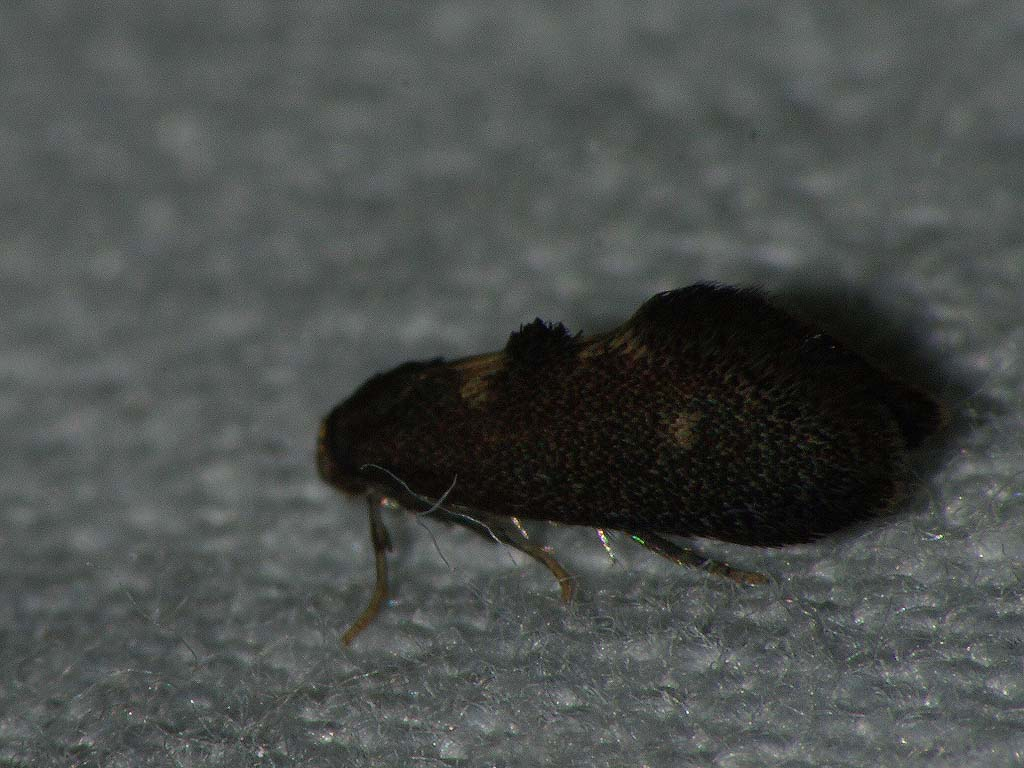

Scientific classification
- Domain: Eukaryota
- Kingdom: Animalia
- Phylum: Arthropoda
- Class: Insecta
- Order: Lepidoptera
- Family: Epermeniidae
- Genus: Phaulernis
- Species: P. dentella

Binomial name
- Phaulernis dentella (Zeller, 1839)

Synonyms
- Aechmia dentella Zeller, 1839; Aechmia subdentella Stainton, 1849

= Phaulernis dentella =

Species of moth

Phaulernis dentella (also known as the scale-tooth lance-wing) is a moth of the family Epermeniidae found in Asia and Europe. The moth was first described by Philipp Christoph Zeller in 1839.

== Description ==
The wingspan is 9–10 mm. The forewings are blackish-brown, with a scattering of white scales and there is a distinct tuft on the dorsum. There is one generation per year with adults on wing in June and can occasionally be seen on the flowers of the larval foodplant.

The larvae feed on the seeds of burnet-saxifrage (Pimpinella saxifraga), bulbous chervil (Chaerophyllum bulbosum), rough chervil (Chaerophyllum temulum), ground elder (Aegopodium podagraria), hogweed (Heracleum sphondylium) and wild angelica (Angelica sylvestris). Larvae can be found from July and August.

== Distribution ==
It is found in central and eastern Europe, the Caucasus and western Siberia.
