= Douglas Eric Kimmins =

British entomologist

- Born: 4 August 1905; Croydon, U.K.
- Died: 30 August 1985 (aged 80); Beckenham, U.K.
- Occupation: Entomologist
- Spouse: Nancy White
- Children: 2
- Scientific career
- Institutions: Royal College of Science; British Museum (Natural History)

Douglas Eric Kimmins (4 August 1905 – 30 August 1985) was a British entomologist.

== Biography ==
Kimmins was born in Croydon on 4 August 1905. His parents were Walter Jesse Kimmins (1874–1968), a clerk for a luggage company, and Nora Marion Kimmins (née Marsh, 1873–1954) who had married in 1903. Kimmins had a younger sister named Nora (1908–1992).

Kimmins' first scientific job was as an assistant to the entomologist Harold Maxwell Lefroy (1877–1925) at the Royal College of Science. In 1925 after Lefroy's death Kimmins began working at the British Museum (Natural History), where he specialised in Neuroptera. Kimmins was employed by the Museum for three days a week, and supplemented his income by producing scientific illustrations for other entomologists.

Kimmins worked at the British Museum with the dragonfly specialist Cynthia Evelyn Longfield, and he named a dragonfly, Corphaeschna longfieldae, after her in 1929 [the name is now accepted as Castoraeschna longfieldae].

In 1938 the British Museum acquired the insect collection of Robert McLachlan (c. 50,000 specimens). Martin Mosely worked to incorporate McLachlan's Trichoptera specimens into the main Museum entomological collections, and both he and Kimmins would work substantially with the McLachlan collection in the subsequent years.

During the Second World War Kimmins was evacuated with the British Museum Neuroptera collections to Wray Castle. Kimmins joined the Home Guard, was eventually called to active service and worked for the Photographic Interpretation Unit of the Intelligence Branch of the Royal Air Force. The home where Kimmins' parents and sister lived was destroyed by a flying bomb in June 1944 but his family escaped without injury.

After the War, Kimmins continued his work with Martin Mosely, concentrating on the British Museum Trichoptera collection. Mosely and Kimmins tried to improve the description of specimens from Australia and New Zealand which had belonged to Robert McLachlan and Francis Walker as the distance to London meant it was difficult for scientists from those countries to access the material. Mosely worked on improving Type specimen descriptions and Kimmins provided drawings. After the death of Mosely in 1948 Kimmins worked on the remaining descriptions alone and the resulting monograph was published in 1953.

During his career Kimmins published 259 scientific papers.

In 1950 Kimmins married Nancy White. White had studied at the Royal School of Needlework and as Nancy Kimmins she became a notable member of the Embroiderers' Guild, helping to organise the creation of new embroideries for the bombed-out church of St Clement Danes in London. Besides entomological illustration, Kimmins himself enjoyed creative activities as a keen photographer, and achieved recognition for his photographic prints and lantern slides.

== Taxonomic names in hour of Kimmins ==
The Neuroptera genus Kimminsia was named in honour of Kimmins by Frederick Killington in 1937.

The dragonfly species Phyllomacromia kimminsi (a.k.a. the Crescent-faced cruiser or Kimmins' cruiser) was named for Kimmins by Frederic Charles Fraser in 1954.

== Select publications ==
- Two New Bittacidae (Mecoptera), Annals and Magazine of Natural History, volume 10, issue 1, pages 395–396 (1928)
- An Egyptian Cave Dwelling Insect, Natural History Magazine, 2, pages 133–136 (1929)
- Notes on the life-history of the Death Watch Beetle, Proceedings and Transactions of the South London Entomological and Natural History Society 1933–1934, pages 133–137 (1934)
- The Odonata of the Oxford University Sarawak Expedition, Journal of the Federated Malay States Museum, 17, pages 65–108 (1936)
- [with Martin Mosely]: The Trichoptera (Caddis-Flies) of Australia and New Zealand (1953)
- Lectotypes of Trichoptera from the McLachlan Collection now in the British Museum (Natural History), Bulletin of the British Museum (Natural History), volume 6, number 4, pages 91–126 (1957)
- The Ephemeroptera types of species described by A. E. Eaton, R. McLachlan and F. Walker, with particular reference to those in the British Museum (Natural History), Bulletin of the British Museum (Natural History), volume 9, pages 269–318 (1960)
- A List of the Type Specimens of Ephemeroptera in the British Museum (Natural History), Bulletin of the British Museum (Natural History), volume 25, pages 309–324 (1971)
