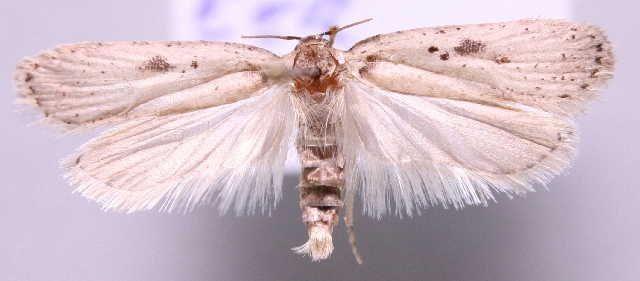

Scientific classification
- Kingdom: Animalia
- Phylum: Arthropoda
- Clade: Pancrustacea
- Class: Insecta
- Order: Lepidoptera
- Family: Depressariidae
- Genus: Agonopterix
- Species: A. yeatiana

Binomial name
- Agonopterix yeatiana (Fabricius, 1781)

Synonyms
- Pyralis yeatiana Fabricius, 1781; Depressaria oglatella Chretien, 1915; Depressaria ventosella Stephens, 1834; Depressaria altricornella Mann, 1855; Depressaria putrida Haworth, 1811; Depressaria albidana Donovan, 1804; Agonopteryx yeatsana Walsingham, [1908]

= Agonopterix yeatiana =

Species of moth

Agonopterix yeatiana is a moth of the family Depressariidae. It is found in most of Europe.

The wingspan is 19–23 mm. The forewings are pale greyish ochreous, with a few black scales; veins sometimes marked with cloudy dark fuscous streaks; first discal stigma black, preceded by a similar dot obliquely above it, second white edged with dark fuscous; a dark fuscous spot between and above these; black terminal dots. Hindwings pale whitish-fuscous. The larva is yellowish-green; head black

Adults are on wing from August to the end of June.

The larvae feed on various umbelliferous plants, including Daucus carota, Chaerophyllum temulum, Peucedanum palustre, Apium graveolens and Oenanthe crocata. The species overwinters as an adult.
