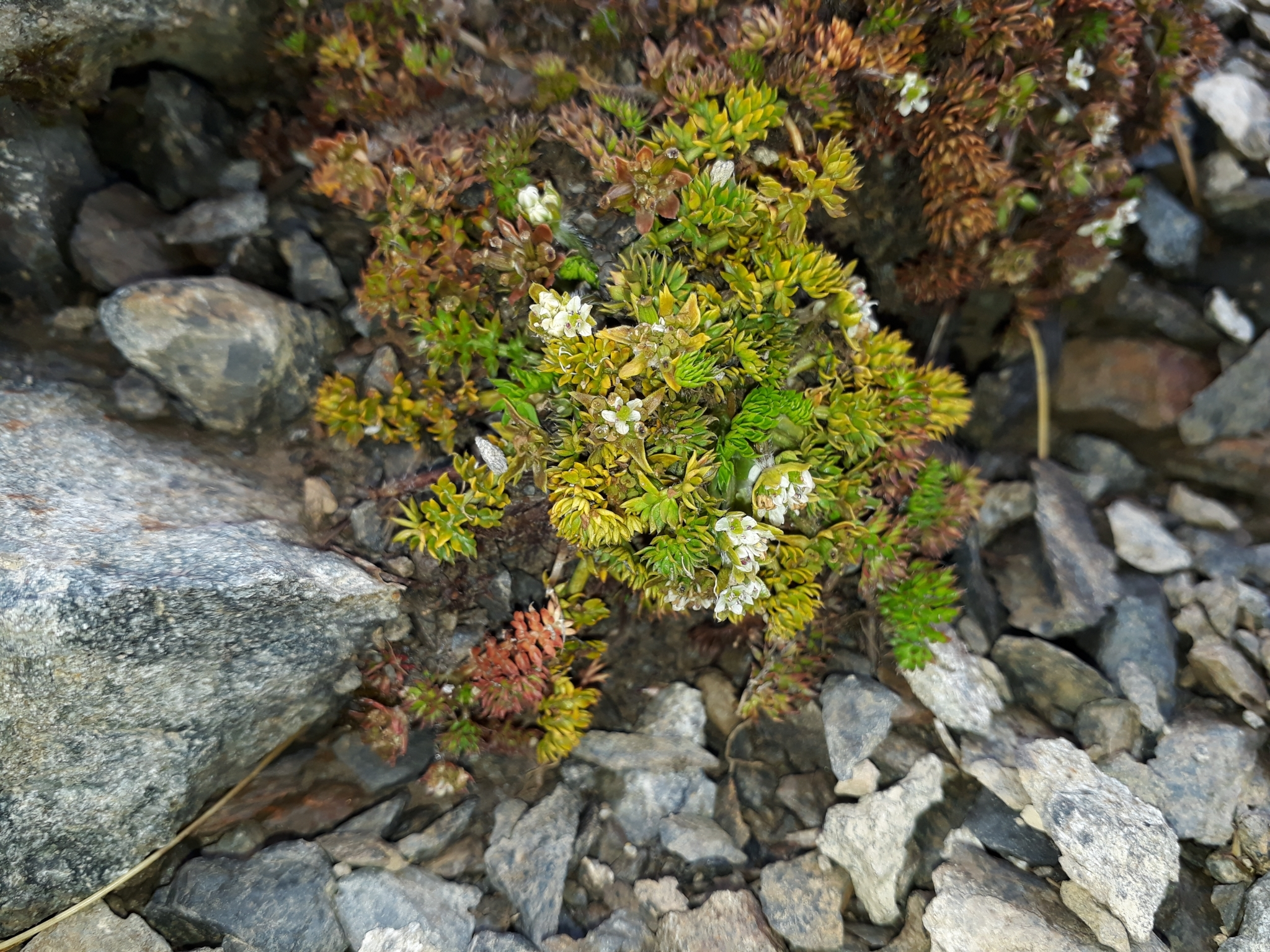
- Chaerophyllum colensoi in the Tararuas

Conservation status
- Not Threatened (NZ TCS)

Scientific classification
- Kingdom: Plantae
- Clade: Tracheophytes
- Clade: Angiosperms
- Clade: Eudicots
- Clade: Asterids
- Order: Apiales
- Family: Apiaceae
- Genus: Chaerophyllum
- Species: C. colensoi

Binomial name
- Chaerophyllum colensoi (Hook.f.) K.F.Chung

= Chaerophyllum colensoi =

Species of plant

Chaerophyllum colensoi, or mountain myrrh, is a species of flowering plant, endemic to New Zealand. It is found on mainland New Zealand and the Chatham Islands. It is a perennial. It is found in alpine environments on the North Island, and throughout the South Island. It either grows near ephemeral water sources or on the edges of tarns. Weeds and changes in hydrology due to differing land usage are its major existential threats. The type specimen was sourced from "New Zealand", and was collected by William Colenso.
