= Chaerophyllum libanoticum =

Scientific classification
- Kingdom: Plantae
- Clade: Tracheophytes
- Clade: Angiosperms
- Clade: Eudicots
- Clade: Asterids
- Order: Apiales
- Family: Apiaceae
- Genus: Chaerophyllum
- Species: C. libanoticum

Binomial name
- Chaerophyllum libanoticum Boiss. & Kotschy

Species of flowering plant

Chaerophyllum libanoticum, the Lebanon chervil, is a perennial or biennial herb in the family Apiaceae. It is native to southern Turkey, Syria, and Lebanon. Locally designated as mentik in parts of Southern Turkey, the plant is historically collected and used as a wild food product.

== Taxonomy ==
The species was described by Edmond Boissier and Theodor Kotschy in 1859. Boissier and Kotschy published the species in 1859 in the second series of Boissier's Diagnoses Plantarum Orientalium Novarum.

== Description ==
Chaerophyllum libanoticum is a biennial or perennial herb with a thick, tuberous taproot. The erect stems are thin, finely striate and glabrous, and grow to 50–100 cm tall. The leaves are large, thin, bright green and deeply divided into narrow pinnatisect segments. The upper leaves are smaller.

Flowering occurs in July and August. The inflorescence forms a wide compound umbel with 12 to 20 slender rays. The umbels are flanked by deciduous, semi-membranous involucral bracts and matching bracteoles. The small, crowded flowers are pure white, with the outermost petals displaying a characteristic radiating pattern. The fruits are dry, cylindrical schizocarps, 10–15 mm long. They are hispid, broaden towards the apex, and have prominent, widely divergent styles.

== Distribution and habitat ==
The species is native to southern Turkey, Syria and Lebanon. Populations are documented along the Amanus mountains and the Alaouite coastal ranges. It's recorded in southern Turkey (such as the Mitisin Plateau in Osmaniye Province), western Syria (primarily near Slenfé within the Latakia Governorate), and the montane regions of northern and central Lebanon.

It occurs in woodland, rocky mountain clearings and on limestone slopes. Within Lebanon, specific localized populations have been mapped around mountainous areas including Bcharre (the species' type locality), Dimane, Hasroun, and Tannourine-el-Foqa.

== Conservation status ==
The species has not been assessed for the IUCN Red List. However, computational modeling compiled under the Angiosperm Extinction Risk Predictions (AERP) initiative suggests the species currently sits at low risk of extinction.

== Phytochemistry and uses ==
In southern Turkey, the aerial parts are traditionally collected as a wild edible and used as a food flavouring.

Gas chromatography–mass spectrometry (GC-MS) identified 64 compounds in the fruit essential oil, representing more than 95% of the oil The extraction yield of the fruit essential oil averages around 0.22% volume per weight (v/w). The major constituents were limonene (26.7%), p-cymene (25.5%) and β-phellandrene (7.0%).

In laboratory bioassays, the fruit essential oil showed moderate radical-scavenging activity in a DPPH assay. In an in-vitro assay, the fruit essential oil inhibited tyrosinase by 17.7% at 1 mg/mL.
