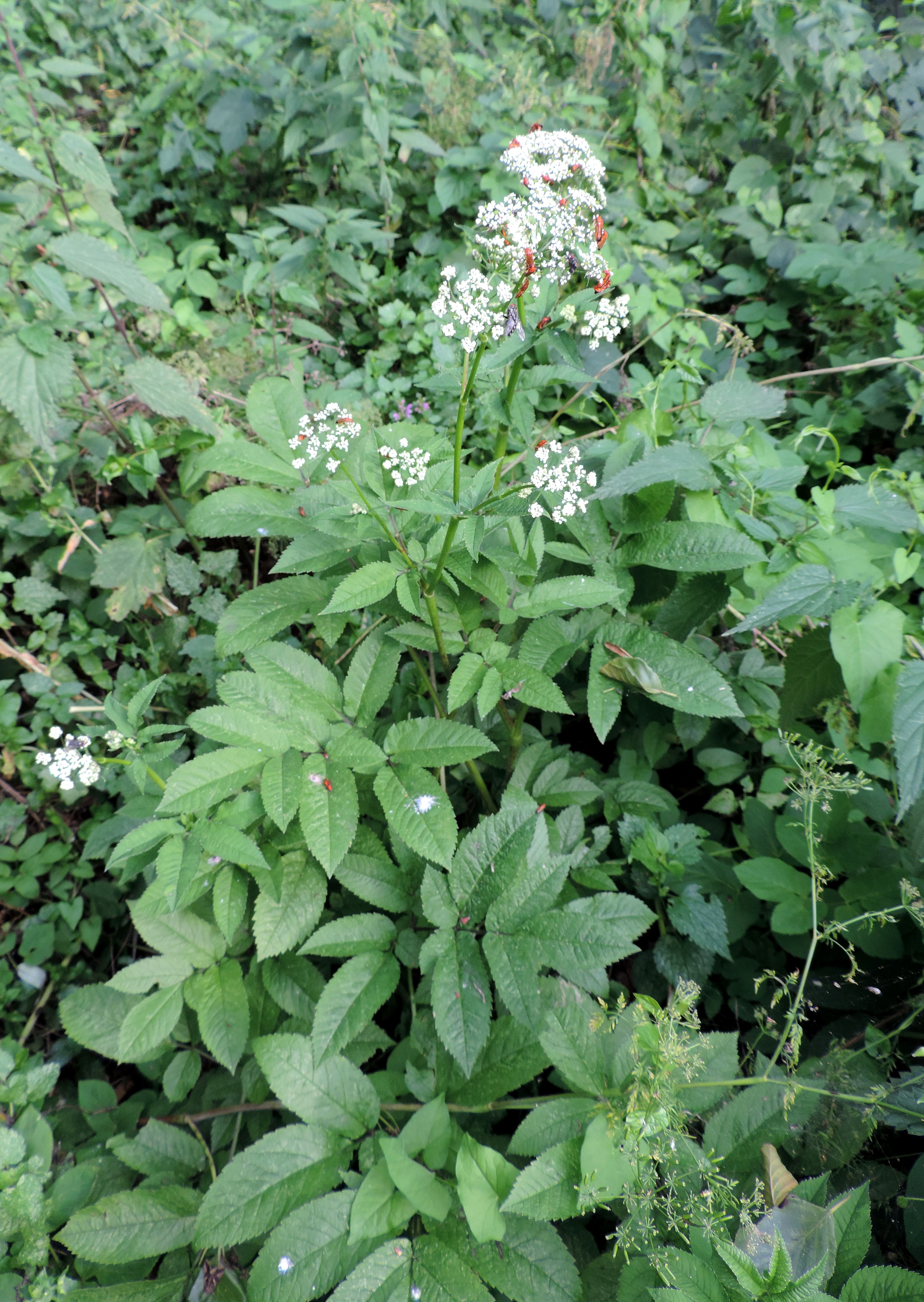

Scientific classification
- Kingdom: Plantae
- Clade: Tracheophytes
- Clade: Angiosperms
- Clade: Eudicots
- Clade: Asterids
- Order: Apiales
- Family: Apiaceae
- Genus: Chaerophyllum
- Species: C. aromaticum

Binomial name
- Chaerophyllum aromaticum L.

= Chaerophyllum aromaticum =

Species of flowering plant

Chaerophyllum aromaticum is a species of flowering plant belonging to the family Apiaceae.

Its native range is Central, Southeastern and Eastern Europe.
