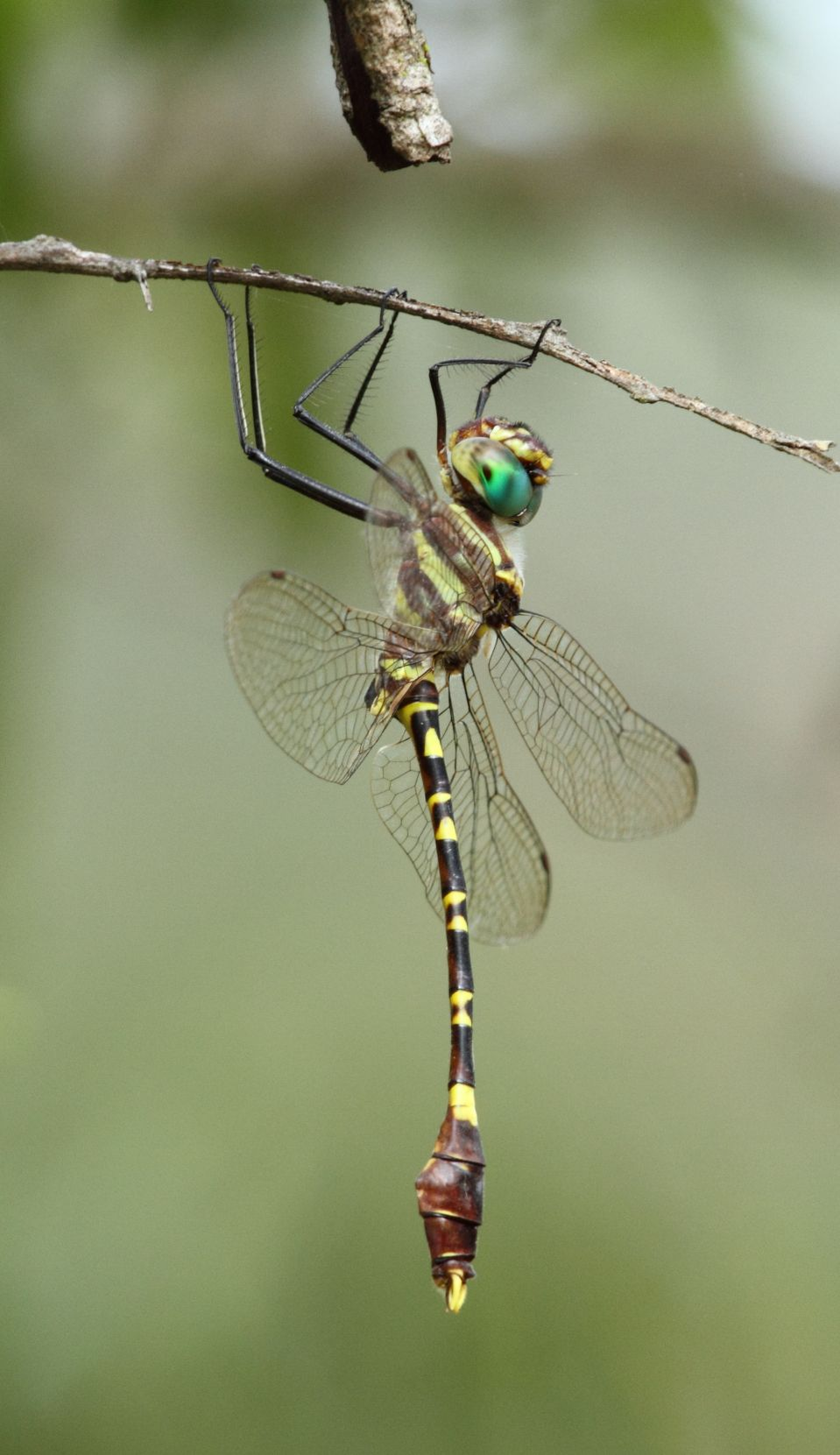

Scientific classification
- Kingdom: Animalia
- Phylum: Arthropoda
- Class: Insecta
- Order: Odonata
- Infraorder: Anisoptera
- Family: Macromiidae
- Genus: Phyllomacromia; Selys, 1878

= Phyllomacromia =

Genus of dragonflies

Phyllomacromia a large genus of dragonflies in the family Macromiidae. They are commonly known as cruisers.

The genus contains the following species:

- Phyllomacromia aeneothorax (Nunney, 1895)
- Phyllomacromia aequatorialis Martin, 1906
- Phyllomacromia africana (Hagen in Selys, 1871)
- Phyllomacromia amicorum (Gambles, 1979)
- Phyllomacromia aureozona (Pinhey, 1966)
- Phyllomacromia bicristulata (Legrand, 1975)
- Phyllomacromia bispina (Fraser, 1954)
- Phyllomacromia caneri (Gauthier, 1987)
- Phyllomacromia congolica (Fraser, 1955)
- Phyllomacromia contumax Selys, 1879 – two-banded cruiser
- Phyllomacromia flavimitella (Pinhey, 1966)
- Phyllomacromia funicularioides (Legrand, 1983)
- Phyllomacromia gamblesi (Lindley, 1980)
- Phyllomacromia girardi (Legrand, 1991)
- Phyllomacromia hervei (Legrand, 1980)
- Phyllomacromia insignis (Kirby, 1889)
- Phyllomacromia kimminsi (Fraser, 1954) – Kimmins' cruiser
- Phyllomacromia lamottei (Legrand, 1993)
- Phyllomacromia legrandi (Gauthier, 1987)
- Phyllomacromia maesi (Schouteden, 1917)
- Phyllomacromia melania (Selys, 1871)
- Phyllomacromia monoceros (Förster, 1906) – black cruiser, unicorn cruiser
- Phyllomacromia nigeriensis (Gambles, 1971)
- Phyllomacromia occidentalis (Fraser, 1954)
- Phyllomacromia overlaeti (Schouteden, 1934) – clubbed cruiser
- Phyllomacromia pallidinervis (Förster, 1906)
- Phyllomacromia paula (Karsch, 1892)
- Phyllomacromia picta (Hagen in Selys, 1871) – darting cruiser
- Phyllomacromia pseudafricana (Pinhey, 1961)
- Phyllomacromia schoutedeni (Fraser, 1954)
- Phyllomacromia seydeli (Fraser, 1954)
- Phyllomacromia sophia (Selys, 1871)
- Phyllomacromia sylvatica (Fraser, 1954)
- Phyllomacromia trifasciata (Rambur, 1842)
- Phyllomacromia unifasciata (Fraser, 1954)
- Phyllomacromia villiersi (Legrand, 1992)
