= Phaulernis laserinella =

Scientific classification
- Domain: Eukaryota
- Kingdom: Animalia
- Phylum: Arthropoda
- Class: Insecta
- Order: Lepidoptera
- Family: Epermeniidae
- Genus: Phaulernis
- Species: P. laserinella

Binomial name
- Phaulernis laserinella Nel, 2003

Species of moth

Phaulernis laserinella is a moth of the family Epermeniidae that is endemic to France.
