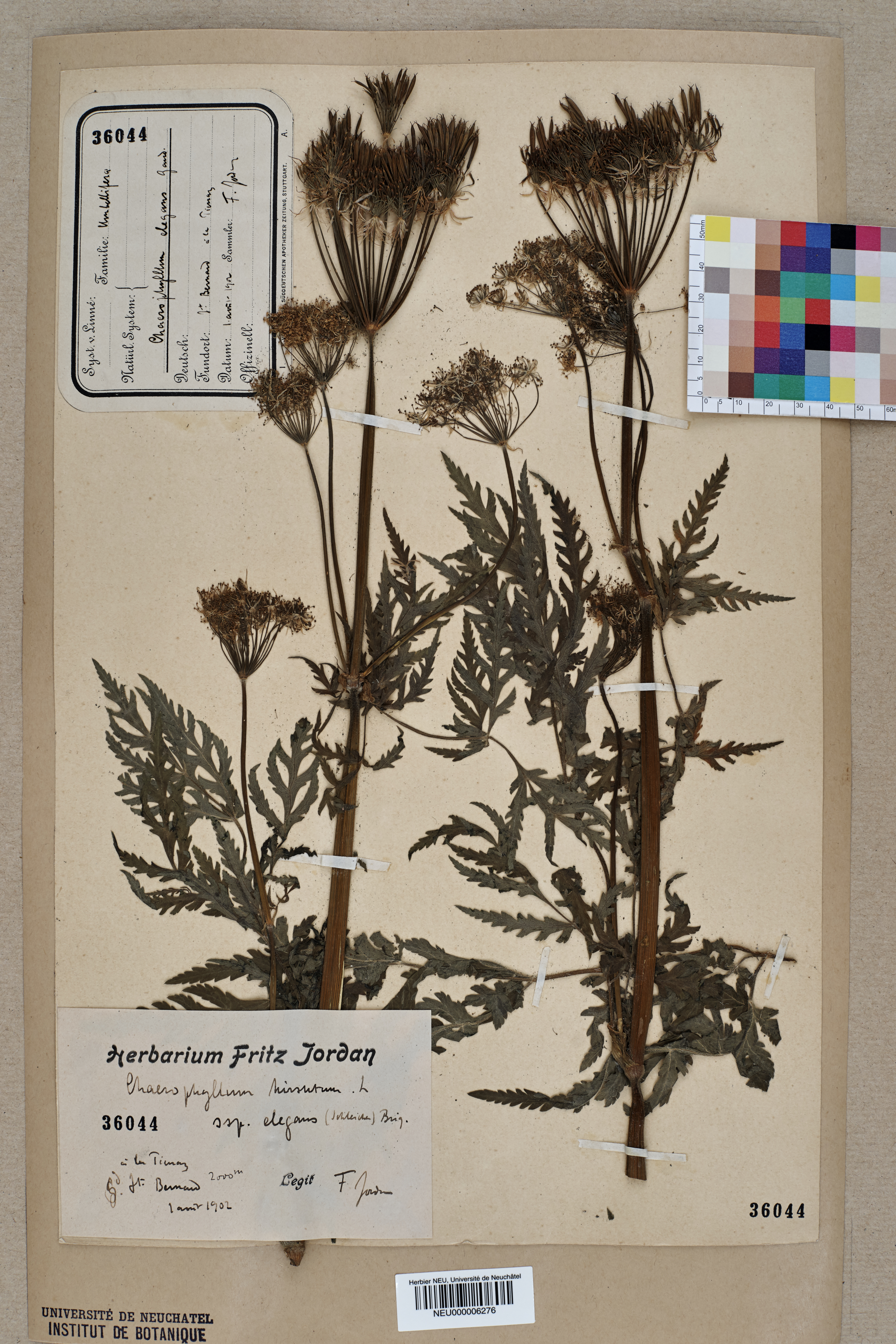

Scientific classification
- Kingdom: Plantae
- Clade: Tracheophytes
- Clade: Angiosperms
- Clade: Eudicots
- Clade: Asterids
- Order: Apiales
- Family: Apiaceae
- Genus: Chaerophyllum
- Species: C. elegans

Binomial name
- Chaerophyllum elegans Gaudin, 1828

Synonyms
- Chaerophyllum hirsutum var. elegans (Gaudin) Arcangeli; Chaerophyllum hirsutum var. elegans (Gaudin) DC.; Chaerophyllum hirsutum subsp. elegans (Gaudin) Ces.

= Chaerophyllum elegans =

Species of flowering plant

Chaerophyllum elegans is a flowering plant species in the genus Chaerophyllum found in the Alps from Switzerland, France and Italy.

Vernacular names

- chérophylle élégant (French)
- Alpen-Kälberkropf (German)
- Schönkälberkropf (German)
- zierlicher Kerbel (German)
- zierlicher Kälberkropf (German)
- cerfoglio elegante (Italian)

Its EPPO code is CHPEL.
