= Phyllomacromia bispina =

Conservation status
- Least Concern (IUCN 3.1)

Scientific classification
- Kingdom: Animalia
- Phylum: Arthropoda
- Class: Insecta
- Order: Odonata
- Infraorder: Anisoptera
- Family: Macromiidae
- Genus: Phyllomacromia
- Species: P. bispina

Binomial name
- Phyllomacromia bispina (Fraser, 1954)

Species of dragonfly

Phyllomacromia bispina is a species of dragonfly in the family Macromiidae. It is found in the Republic of the Congo, the Democratic Republic of the Congo, Uganda, and Zambia. Its natural habitats are subtropical or tropical moist lowland forests and rivers. It is threatened by habitat loss.
