= Phyllomacromia congolica =

Conservation status
- Least Concern (IUCN 3.1)

Scientific classification
- Kingdom: Animalia
- Phylum: Arthropoda
- Class: Insecta
- Order: Odonata
- Infraorder: Anisoptera
- Family: Macromiidae
- Genus: Phyllomacromia
- Species: P. congolica

Binomial name
- Phyllomacromia congolica (Fraser, 1955)

Species of dragonfly

Phyllomacromia congolica is a species of dragonfly in the family Macromiidae. It has lime green/yellow and black stripes. It is found in the Democratic Republic of the Congo, Malawi, Zambia, Zimbabwe, and possibly Guinea.
