= Phyllomacromia aureozona =

Conservation status
- Least Concern (IUCN 3.1)

Scientific classification
- Kingdom: Animalia
- Phylum: Arthropoda
- Class: Insecta
- Order: Odonata
- Infraorder: Anisoptera
- Family: Macromiidae
- Genus: Phyllomacromia
- Species: P. aureozona

Binomial name
- Phyllomacromia aureozona (Pinhey, 1966)

Species of dragonfly

Phyllomacromia aureozona is a species of dragonfly in the family Macromiidae. It is found in the Republic of the Congo, the Democratic Republic of the Congo, Uganda, and Zambia. Its natural habitats are subtropical or tropical moist lowland forests and rivers.
