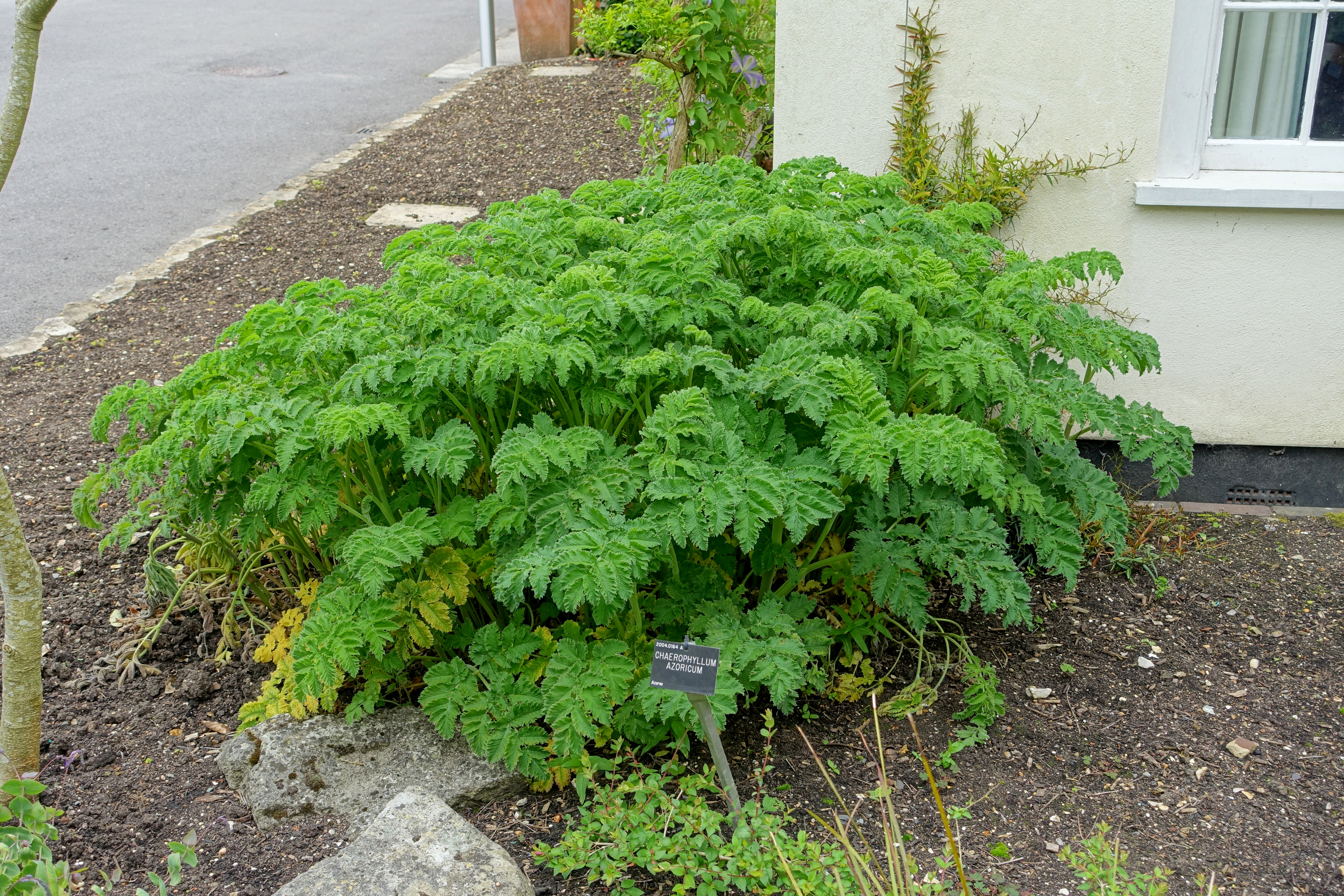

Scientific classification
- Kingdom: Plantae
- Clade: Tracheophytes
- Clade: Angiosperms
- Clade: Eudicots
- Clade: Asterids
- Order: Apiales
- Family: Apiaceae
- Genus: Chaerophyllum
- Species: C. azoricum

Binomial name
- Chaerophyllum azoricum Trel.

= Chaerophyllum azoricum =

Species of flowering plant

Chaerophyllum azoricum is a species of flowering plant in the family Apiaceae, endemic to the Azores. It inhabits Erica and Calluna shrubland, natural meadows of altitude, cliffs and slopes, woods of Pittosporum and roadsides. It is present in four of the nine islands.
