= Phaulernis statariella =

Scientific classification
- Domain: Eukaryota
- Kingdom: Animalia
- Phylum: Arthropoda
- Class: Insecta
- Order: Lepidoptera
- Family: Epermeniidae
- Genus: Phaulernis
- Species: P. statariella

Binomial name
- Phaulernis statariella (Heyden, 1863)

Synonyms
- Oecophora statariella Heyden, 1863; Oecophora laserpitiella Pfaffenzeller, 1870; Oecophora silerinella Zeller, 1868

Species of moth

Phaulernis statariella is a moth of the family Epermeniidae. It is found in France, Austria, Switzerland, Italy, Bosnia and Herzegovina, Slovakia and Poland.

The larvae feed on Laserpitium siler.
