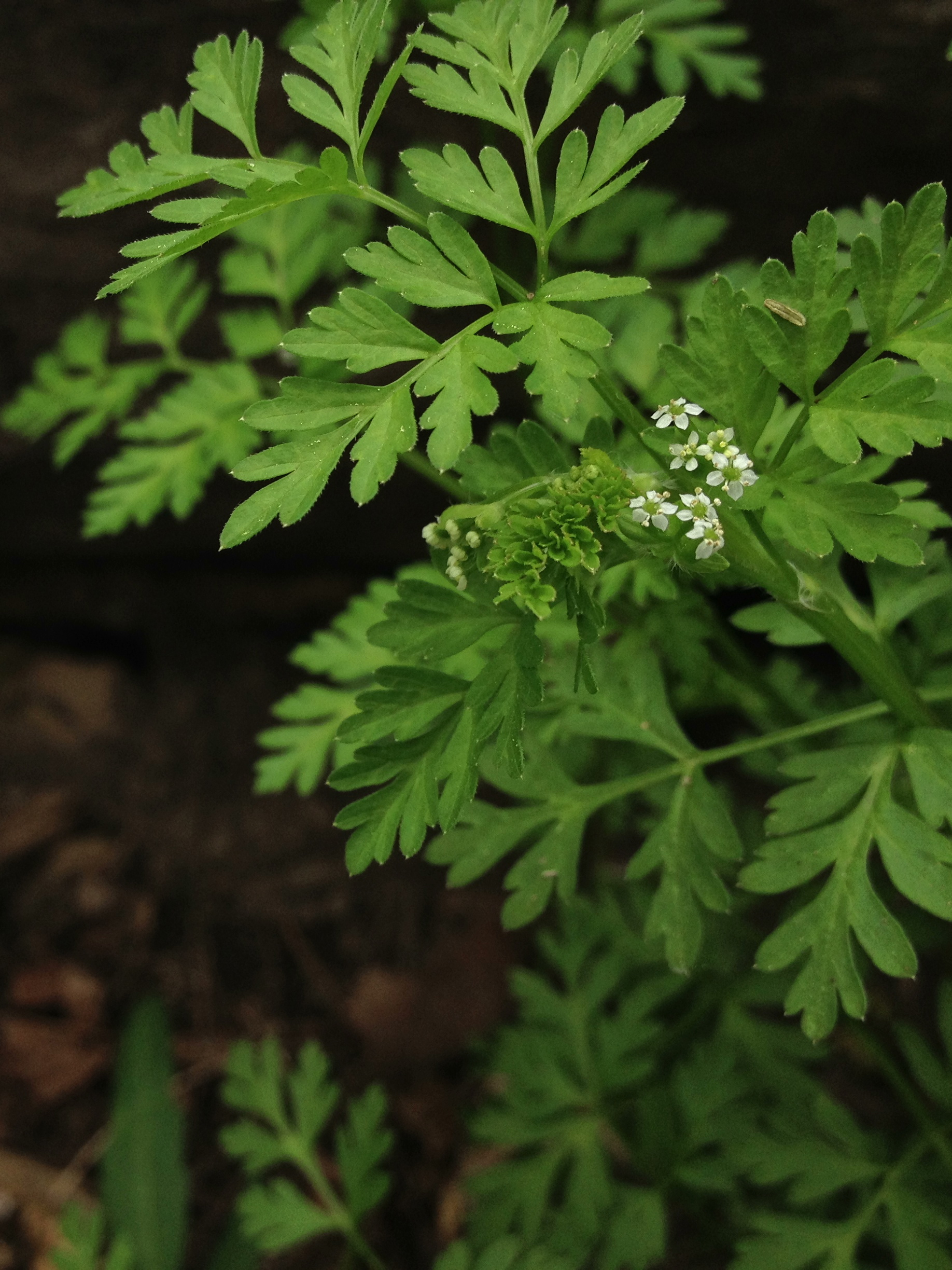

Scientific classification
- Kingdom: Plantae
- Clade: Tracheophytes
- Clade: Angiosperms
- Clade: Eudicots
- Clade: Asterids
- Order: Apiales
- Family: Apiaceae
- Genus: Chaerophyllum
- Species: C. procumbens

Binomial name
- Chaerophyllum procumbens (L.) Crantz

Synonyms
- Chaerophyllum articulatum Bosc ex DC. Chaerophyllum bifidum Willd. ex DC. Chaerophyllum boscii Steud. Scandix procumbens L.

= Chaerophyllum procumbens =

Species of flowering plant

Chaerophyllum procumbens, known by the common names spreading chervil and wild chervil, is an annual forb native to the eastern United States and Canada, which produces small white flowers in spring.

== Description ==
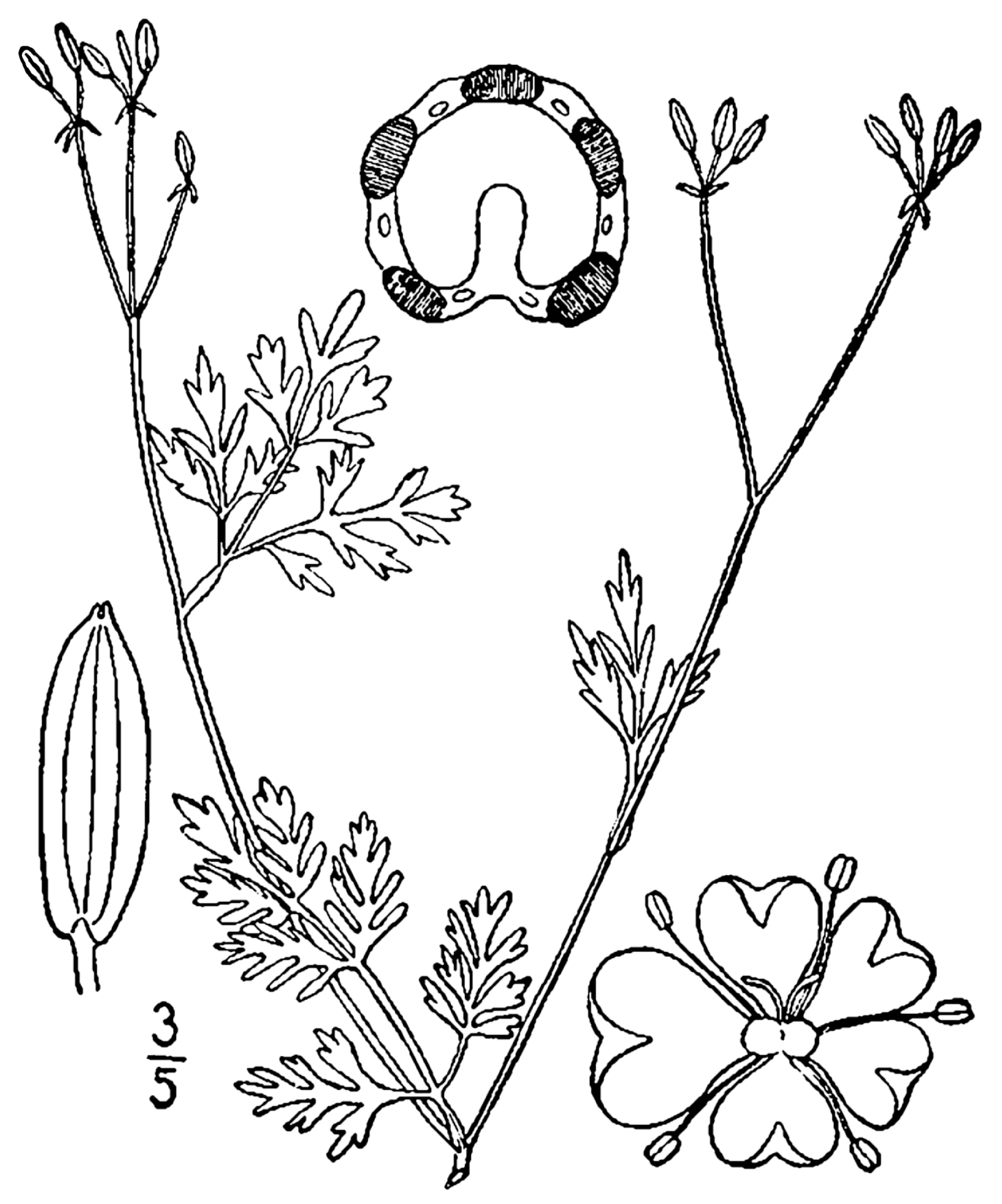
Botanical illustration of Chaerophyllum procumbens (1913)

Chaerophyllum procumbens is 15 to 50 centimeters tall. Several slender branching stems emerge from the base of the plant. The stems are shiny, but have a line of fine hairs running up them. The mostly hairless triangular compound leaves are doubly pinnate, with leaflets that are themselves pinnatifid. The lower leaves are borne on petioles, the upper leaves are smaller and nearly sessile. The upper stems terminate in compound umbels consisting of approximately 2 to 6 umbellets, each with 1 to 7 small white flowers with 5 petals. The flowers often bloom before the umbels have fully expanded. The fruit is an oblong capsule, 4 to 6 millimeters long, with longitudinal ridges.

== Distribution and habitat ==
Chaerophyllum procumbens is widely distributed in the eastern United States, although local distribution may be spotty. It has been recorded in Alabama, Arkansas, Washington, D.C., Delaware, Florida, Georgia, Iowa, Illinois, Indiana, Kansas, Kentucky, Maryland, Michigan, Missouri, Mississippi, North Carolina, Nebraska, New Jersey, New York, Ohio, Oklahoma, Pennsylvania, South Carolina, Tennessee, Virginia, Wisconsin, and West Virginia. It has also been recorded in the Canadian province of Ontario. Chaerophyllum procumbens is listed as an endangered species by the state of New York. In Virginia, it grows in habitats including floodplain forests and alluvial clearings. The presence of this species is dependent on appropriate habitat, and it may be eliminated from an area by development, changes in land use, or competition with invasive species.
