= Phyllomacromia pseudafricana =

Conservation status
- Least Concern (IUCN 3.1)

Scientific classification
- Kingdom: Animalia
- Phylum: Arthropoda
- Clade: Pancrustacea
- Class: Insecta
- Order: Odonata
- Suborder: Anisoptera
- Superfamily: Libelluloidea
- Family: Macromiidae
- Genus: Phyllomacromia
- Species: P. pseudafricana

Binomial name
- Phyllomacromia pseudafricana (Pinhey, 1961)

Species of dragonfly

Phyllomacromia pseudafricana is a species of dragonfly in the family Macromiidae. It is found in Benin, Ivory Coast, Ghana, Nigeria, and Uganda. Its natural habitats are subtropical or tropical moist lowland forests and rivers.
