= Phyllomacromia flavimitella =

Conservation status
- Least Concern (IUCN 3.1)

Scientific classification
- Kingdom: Animalia
- Phylum: Arthropoda
- Class: Insecta
- Order: Odonata
- Infraorder: Anisoptera
- Family: Macromiidae
- Genus: Phyllomacromia
- Species: P. flavimitella

Binomial name
- Phyllomacromia flavimitella (Pinhey, 1966)

Species of dragonfly

Phyllomacromia flavimitella is a species of dragonfly in the family Macromiidae. It is found in Central African Republic, the Democratic Republic of the Congo, Uganda, and possibly the Republic of the Congo. Its natural habitats are subtropical or tropical moist lowland forests and rivers. It is threatened by habitat loss.
