= Phaulernis chasanica =

Scientific classification
- Kingdom: Animalia
- Phylum: Arthropoda
- Clade: Pancrustacea
- Class: Insecta
- Order: Lepidoptera
- Family: Epermeniidae
- Genus: Phaulernis
- Species: P. chasanica

Binomial name
- Phaulernis chasanica Gaedike, 1993

Species of moth

Phaulernis chasanica is a moth of the family Epermeniidae. It is found in the Russian Far East and Japan (Hokkaido, Honshu).

The length of the forewings is 5-5.7 mm.
