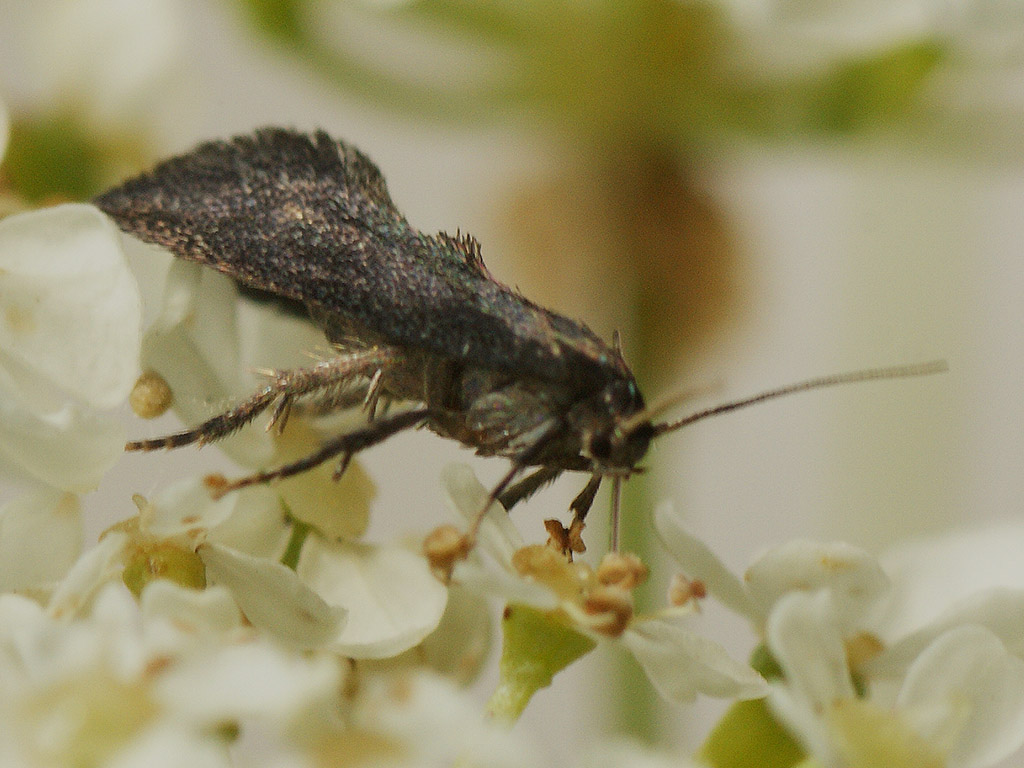
- Russia, Moscow Oblast, town of Pushchino, 12.06.2015, on Apiaceae flowers,

Scientific classification
- Domain: Eukaryota
- Kingdom: Animalia
- Phylum: Arthropoda
- Class: Insecta
- Order: Lepidoptera
- Family: Epermeniidae
- Genus: Phaulernis; Meyrick, 1895

= Phaulernis =

Genus of moths

Phaulernis is a genus of moths in the family Epermeniidae.

== Species ==
- Phaulernis africana Gaedike, 2013
- Phaulernis chasanica Gaedike, 1993
- Phaulernis dentella (Zeller, 1839) (originally in Aechmia)
- Phaulernis fulviguttella (Zeller, 1839) (originally in Cataplectica)
- Phaulernis laserinella J. Nel, 2003
- Phaulernis montuosa Gaedike, 2013
- Phaulernis pulchra Gaedike, 1993
- Phaulernis rebeliella Gaedike, 1966
- Phaulernis statariella (Heyden, 1863) (originally in Heydenia)

== Former species ==
- Phaulernis auromaculata (Frey, 1867) (originally in Oecophora)
- Phaulernis laserpitiella (Pfaffenzeller, 1870) (originally in Heydenia)
- Phaulernis monticola Inoue et al., 1982
- Phaulernis silerinella (Rebel, 1916) (originally in Epermenia)
- Phaulernis silerinella (Zeller, 1868) (originally in Heydenia)
- Phaulernis subdentella (Stainton, 1849) (originally in Aechmia)
