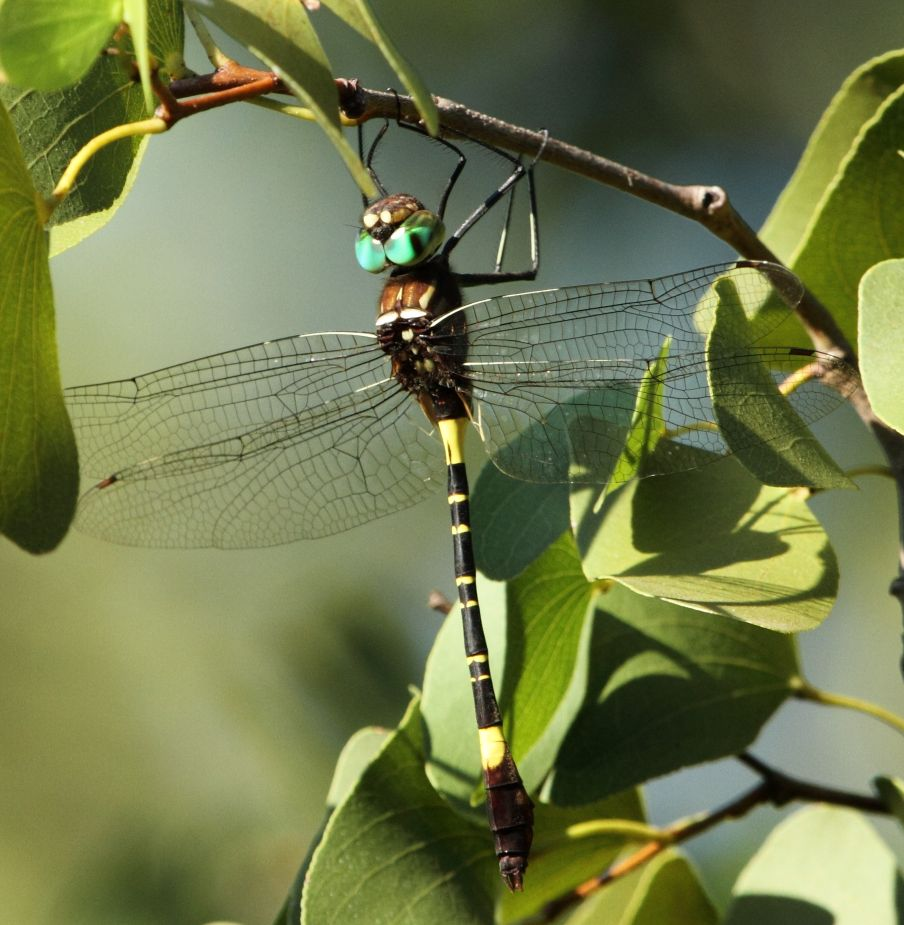
- Male at Shingwedzi

Conservation status
- Least Concern (IUCN 3.1)

Scientific classification
- Kingdom: Animalia
- Phylum: Arthropoda
- Class: Insecta
- Order: Odonata
- Infraorder: Anisoptera
- Family: Macromiidae
- Genus: Phyllomacromia
- Species: P. contumax

Binomial name
- Phyllomacromia contumax Selys, 1879

Synonyms
- Macromia halei; Macromia melania; Phyllomacromia bifasciata; Phyllomacromia biflava; Phyllomacromia leoni; Phyllomacromia nyanzana; Phyllomacromia reginae; Trithemis monardi

= Phyllomacromia contumax =

Species of dragonfly

Phyllomacromia contumax, the two-banded cruiser, is a species of dragonfly in the family Macromiidae that lives in sub-Saharan Africa. Its natural habitats are woodlands, gallery forests, rivers, and lakes in subtropical or tropical savanna.
