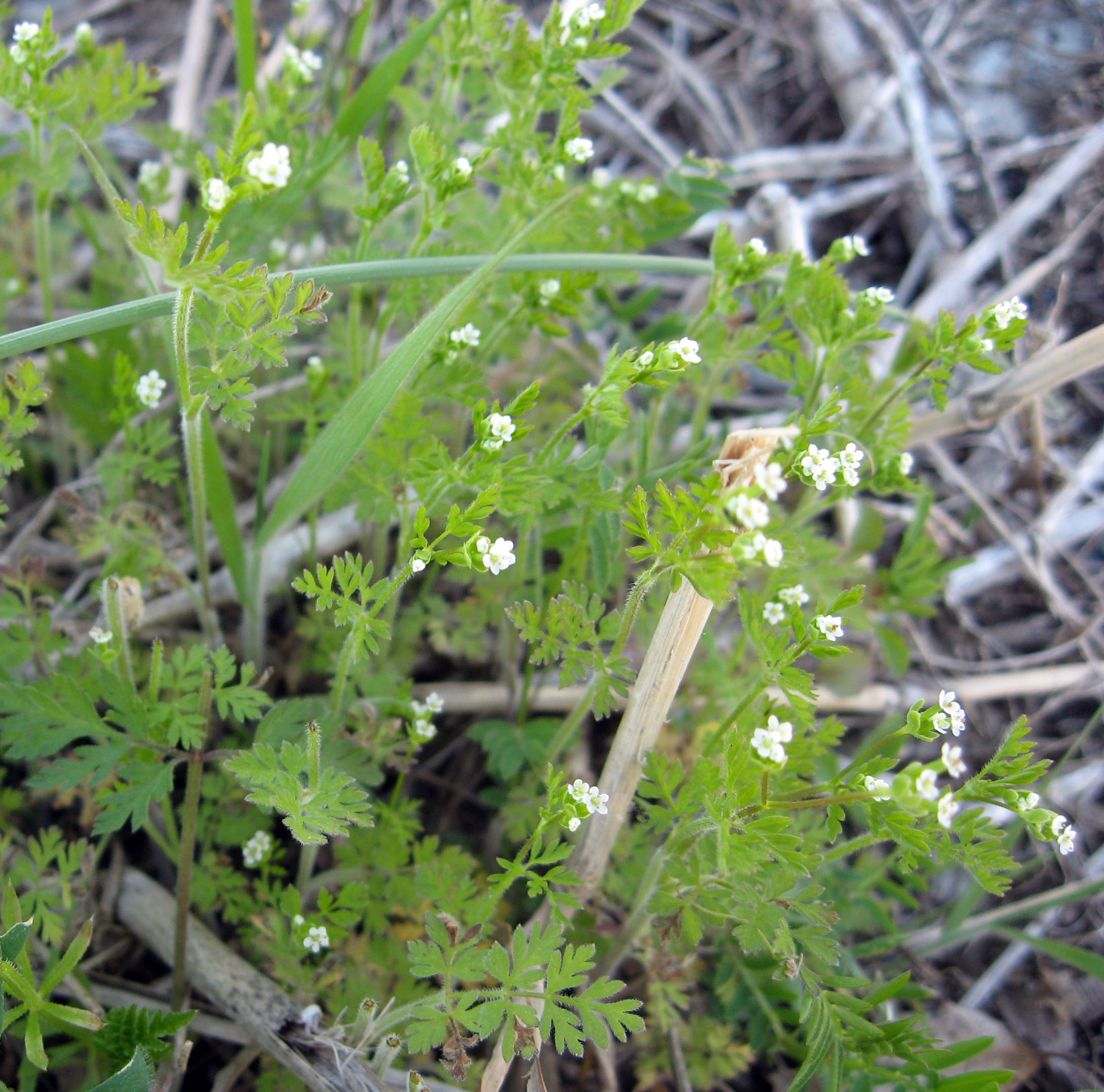

Scientific classification
- Kingdom: Plantae
- Clade: Embryophytes
- Clade: Tracheophytes
- Clade: Spermatophytes
- Clade: Angiosperms
- Clade: Eudicots
- Clade: Asterids
- Order: Apiales
- Family: Apiaceae
- Genus: Chaerophyllum
- Species: C. tainturieri

Binomial name
- Chaerophyllum tainturieri Hook.

Synonyms
- Chaerophyllum daucophyllum Nutt.; Chaerophyllum floridanum (J.M.Coult. & Rose) Bush; Chaerophyllum texanum J.M.Coult. & Rose

= Chaerophyllum tainturieri =

Species of flowering plant

Chaerophyllum tainturieri, known by the common names hairyfruit chervil and southern chervil, is a forb and annual plant native to the south-eastern United States, with disjunct populations in Arizona and New Mexico. It is a common plant, found in glades, fields, and disturbed areas. It produces small white umbels of flowers in the spring.

This species was the subject of a germination study, which revealed a new type of seed dormancy.

Its was discovered by a Frenchman Mr Louis François Tainturier des Essards (ca1767-1839) living in New Orleans.

== Description ==
Chaerophyllum tainturieri is an annual herb that can reach up to 32 inches in height. Its leaves are opposite and bipinnate. Flowers are grouped in an umbel and are small, white and 5-petaled. C. tainturieri blooms from March through May. Its fruit is a caryopsis.
