= Pseudophytoecia suturalis =

Scientific classification
- Kingdom: Animalia
- Phylum: Arthropoda
- Class: Insecta
- Order: Coleoptera
- Suborder: Polyphaga
- Infraorder: Cucujiformia
- Family: Cerambycidae
- Genus: Pseudophytoecia
- Species: P. suturalis

Binomial name
- Pseudophytoecia suturalis (Aurivillius, 1914)

Synonyms
- Phytoecia suturalis Aurivillius, 1914

Species of beetle

Pseudophytoecia suturalis is a species of beetle in the family Cerambycidae. It was described by Per Olof Christopher Aurivillius in 1914. It is known from Kenya.
