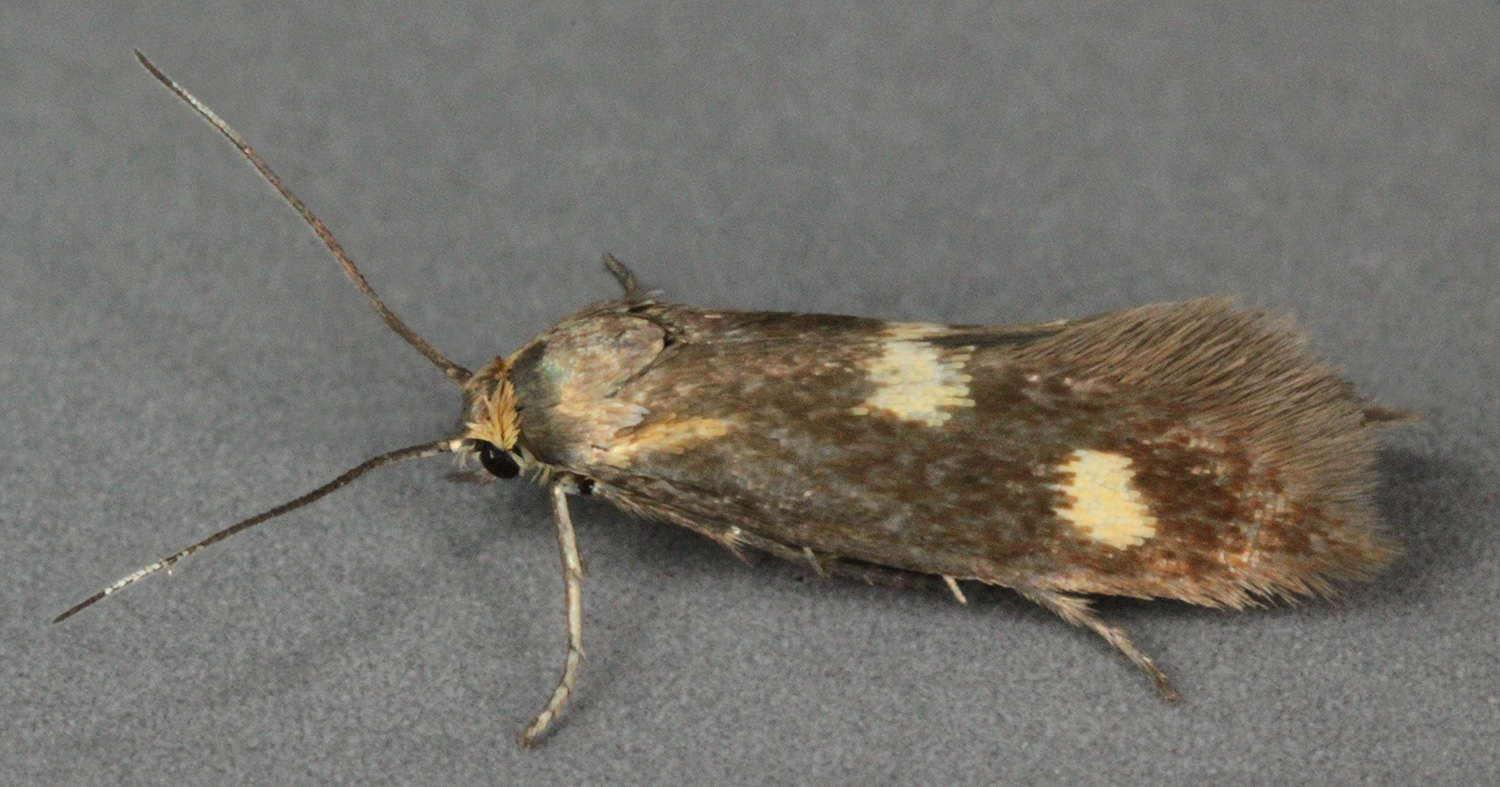

Scientific classification
- Domain: Eukaryota
- Kingdom: Animalia
- Phylum: Arthropoda
- Class: Insecta
- Order: Lepidoptera
- Family: Epermeniidae
- Genus: Phaulernis
- Species: P. fulviguttella

Binomial name
- Phaulernis fulviguttella (Zeller, 1839)

Synonyms
- Oecophora fulviguttella Zeller, 1839; Oecophora flavimaculella Stainton, 1849; Oecophora auromaculata Frey, 1867; Phaulernis monticola Moriuti, 1982

= Phaulernis fulviguttella =

Yellow-spotted lance-wing

Species of moth

Phaulernis fulviguttella, the yellow-spotted lance-wing, is a moth of the family Epermeniidae found in the Palearctic including Europe.

== Description ==
The wingspan is 10–11 mm. The forewings are dark fuscous; a spot on dorsum towards tornus, and another in disc posteriorly pale ochreous-yellow. The hindwings are dark fuscous. The larva is whitish; head brownish.

There is one generation per year with adults on wing from July to August.

The larvae feed on the seeds of Peucedanum, Angelica, Heracleum and Pimpinella species, as well as Scots lovage (Ligusticum scoticum).

== Distribution ==
It is found in most of Europe, the Caucasus, the Russian Far East and Japan.

== Taxonomy ==
Phaulernis fulviguttella was the scientific name used by Philipp Christoph Zeller when he described a specimen found in Bohmen, Mecklenburg, Germany in 1839. Zeller originally placed Phaulernis fulviguttella in the genus Oecophora as did Stainton in 1849 and Frey in 1867, when they also described the moth, not knowing about Zeller's earlier description.
