= Phyllomacromia pallidinervis =

Conservation status
- Least Concern (IUCN 3.1)

Scientific classification
- Kingdom: Animalia
- Phylum: Arthropoda
- Clade: Pancrustacea
- Class: Insecta
- Order: Odonata
- Suborder: Anisoptera
- Superfamily: Libelluloidea
- Family: Macromiidae
- Genus: Phyllomacromia
- Species: P. pallidinervis

Binomial name
- Phyllomacromia pallidinervis (Förster, 1906)

Species of dragonfly

Phyllomacromia pallidinervis is a species of dragonfly in the family Macromiidae. It is found in Ethiopia, Kenya, and Somalia. Its natural habitats are subtropical or tropical dry shrubland, subtropical or tropical moist shrubland, and rivers. It is threatened by habitat loss.
