= Chaerophyllum byzantinum =

Scientific classification
- Kingdom: Plantae
- Clade: Tracheophytes
- Clade: Angiosperms
- Clade: Eudicots
- Clade: Asterids
- Order: Apiales
- Family: Apiaceae
- Genus: Chaerophyllum
- Species: C. byzantinum

Binomial name
- Chaerophyllum byzantinum Boiss.

Synonyms
- Chaerophyllum angelicifolium DC.

Species of flowering plant

Chaerophyllum byzantinum is a species of flowering plant in the family Apiaceae. It is native to Bulgaria and Turkey, including East Thrace. In addition, it has been introduced into Germany.
