= Phaulernis montuosa =

Scientific classification
- Kingdom: Animalia
- Phylum: Arthropoda
- Clade: Pancrustacea
- Class: Insecta
- Order: Lepidoptera
- Family: Epermeniidae
- Genus: Phaulernis
- Species: P. montuosa

Binomial name
- Phaulernis montuosa Gaedike, 2013

Species of moth

Phaulernis montuosa is a moth in the family Epermeniidae. It was described by Reinhard Gaedike in 2013. It is found in Kenya, Malawi and Tanzania.
