= Phaulernis rebeliella =

Scientific classification
- Kingdom: Animalia
- Phylum: Arthropoda
- Clade: Pancrustacea
- Class: Insecta
- Order: Lepidoptera
- Family: Epermeniidae
- Genus: Phaulernis
- Species: P. rebeliella

Binomial name
- Phaulernis rebeliella Gaedike, 1966

Synonyms
- Epermenia silerinella Rebel, 1916 (preocc. Zeller, 1868)

Species of moth

Phaulernis rebeliella is a moth of the family Epermeniidae. It is found in France, Austria, Switzerland, Italy, Slovakia, Croatia and Slovenia.
