= Pseudophytoecia =

Scientific classification
- Kingdom: Animalia
- Phylum: Arthropoda
- Class: Insecta
- Order: Coleoptera
- Suborder: Polyphaga
- Infraorder: Cucujiformia
- Family: Cerambycidae
- Tribe: Saperdini
- Genus: Pseudophytoecia

Genus of beetles

Pseudophytoecia is a genus of longhorn beetles of the subfamily Lamiinae, containing the following species:

- Pseudophytoecia africana (Aurivillius, 1914)
- Pseudophytoecia suturalis (Aurivillius, 1914)
