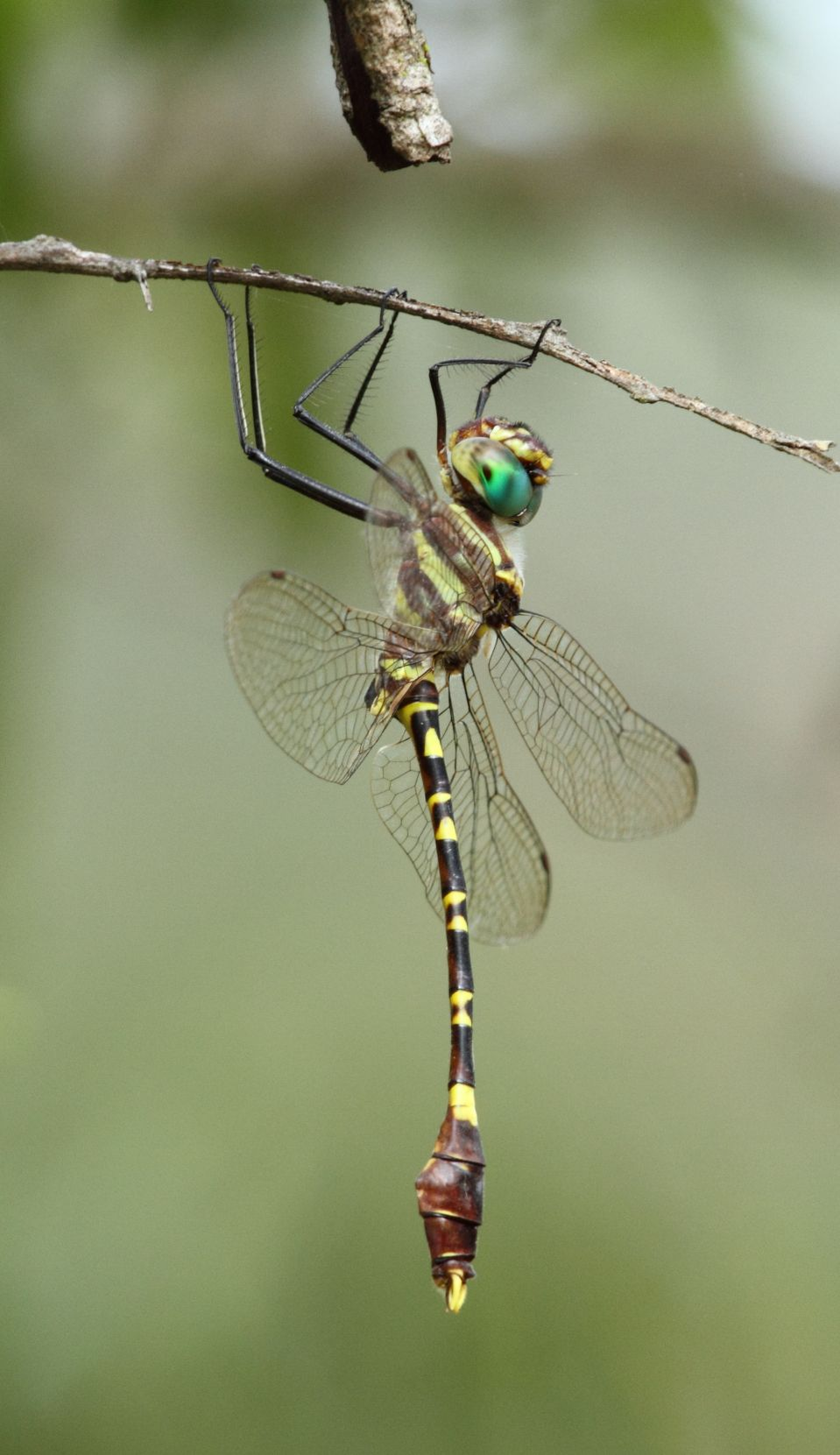
- Male at Cumberland Nature Reserve

Conservation status
- Least Concern (IUCN 3.1)

Scientific classification
- Kingdom: Animalia
- Phylum: Arthropoda
- Clade: Pancrustacea
- Class: Insecta
- Order: Odonata
- Suborder: Anisoptera
- Superfamily: Libelluloidea
- Family: Macromiidae
- Genus: Phyllomacromia
- Species: P. picta

Binomial name
- Phyllomacromia picta (Hagen in Selys, 1871)

= Phyllomacromia picta =

Species of dragonfly

Phyllomacromia picta is a species of dragonfly in the family Macromiidae. It is found in Angola, Botswana, Burundi, Chad, Ethiopia, Kenya, Malawi, Mozambique, Namibia, South Africa, Tanzania, Uganda, Zambia, and Zimbabwe. Its natural habitats are subtropical or tropical moist lowland forests, dry savanna, moist savanna, subtropical or tropical dry shrubland, subtropical or tropical moist shrubland, rivers, and intermittent rivers.
