= Phaulernis pulchra =

Scientific classification
- Kingdom: Animalia
- Phylum: Arthropoda
- Clade: Pancrustacea
- Class: Insecta
- Order: Lepidoptera
- Family: Epermeniidae
- Genus: Phaulernis
- Species: P. pulchra

Binomial name
- Phaulernis pulchra Gaedike, 1993

Species of moth

Phaulernis pulchra is a moth of the family Epermeniidae. It is found in the Russian Far East and Japan (Hokkaido, Kyushu).

The length of the forewings is about 6 mm for males and 7 mm for females.
