= Phyllomacromia sylvatica =

Conservation status
- Least Concern (IUCN 3.1)

Scientific classification
- Kingdom: Animalia
- Phylum: Arthropoda
- Clade: Pancrustacea
- Class: Insecta
- Order: Odonata
- Suborder: Anisoptera
- Superfamily: Libelluloidea
- Family: Macromiidae
- Genus: Phyllomacromia
- Species: P. sylvatica

Binomial name
- Phyllomacromia sylvatica (Fraser, 1954)

Species of dragonfly

Phyllomacromia sylvatica is a species of dragonfly in the family Macromiidae. It is found in Kenya, Tanzania, and Uganda. Its natural habitats are subtropical or tropical moist lowland forests and rivers. It is threatened by habitat loss.
