= Phyllomacromia monoceros =

Conservation status
- Least Concern (IUCN 3.1)

Scientific classification
- Kingdom: Animalia
- Phylum: Arthropoda
- Class: Insecta
- Order: Odonata
- Infraorder: Anisoptera
- Family: Macromiidae
- Genus: Phyllomacromia
- Species: P. monoceros

Binomial name
- Phyllomacromia monoceros (Förster, 1906)

Species of insect

Phyllomacromia monoceros is a species of dragonfly in the family Macromiidae. It is found in the Democratic Republic of the Congo, Kenya, Malawi, Mozambique, Somalia, South Africa, Tanzania, Uganda, Zambia, Zimbabwe, possibly Burundi, and possibly Sierra Leone. Its natural habitats include subtropical and tropical moist lowland forests, dry and moist shrublands, high-altitude shrublands, and rivers.
