= Phyllomacromia africana =

Conservation status
- Least Concern (IUCN 3.1)

Scientific classification
- Kingdom: Animalia
- Phylum: Arthropoda
- Class: Insecta
- Order: Odonata
- Infraorder: Anisoptera
- Family: Macromiidae
- Genus: Phyllomacromia
- Species: P. africana

Binomial name
- Phyllomacromia africana (Selys, 1871)

Species of dragonfly

Phyllomacromia africana is a species of dragonfly in the family Macromiidae. It is found in the Republic of the Congo, the Democratic Republic of the Congo, Egypt, Ghana, Guinea-Bissau, Nigeria, Senegal, Sudan, Tanzania, Uganda, possibly Ethiopia, and possibly Malawi. Its natural habitats are subtropical or tropical moist lowland forests and rivers.
