= Parastrigulia =

Parastrigulia africana

Scientific classification
- Kingdom: Animalia
- Phylum: Arthropoda
- Class: Insecta
- Order: Coleoptera
- Suborder: Polyphaga
- Infraorder: Elateriformia
- Family: Buprestidae
- Genus: Parastrigulia; Bellamy, 1988
- Species: P. africana

Binomial name
- Parastrigulia africana (Kerremans, 1899)

Genus of beetles

Parastrigulia africana is a species of beetles in the family Buprestidae, the only species in the genus Parastrigulia.
