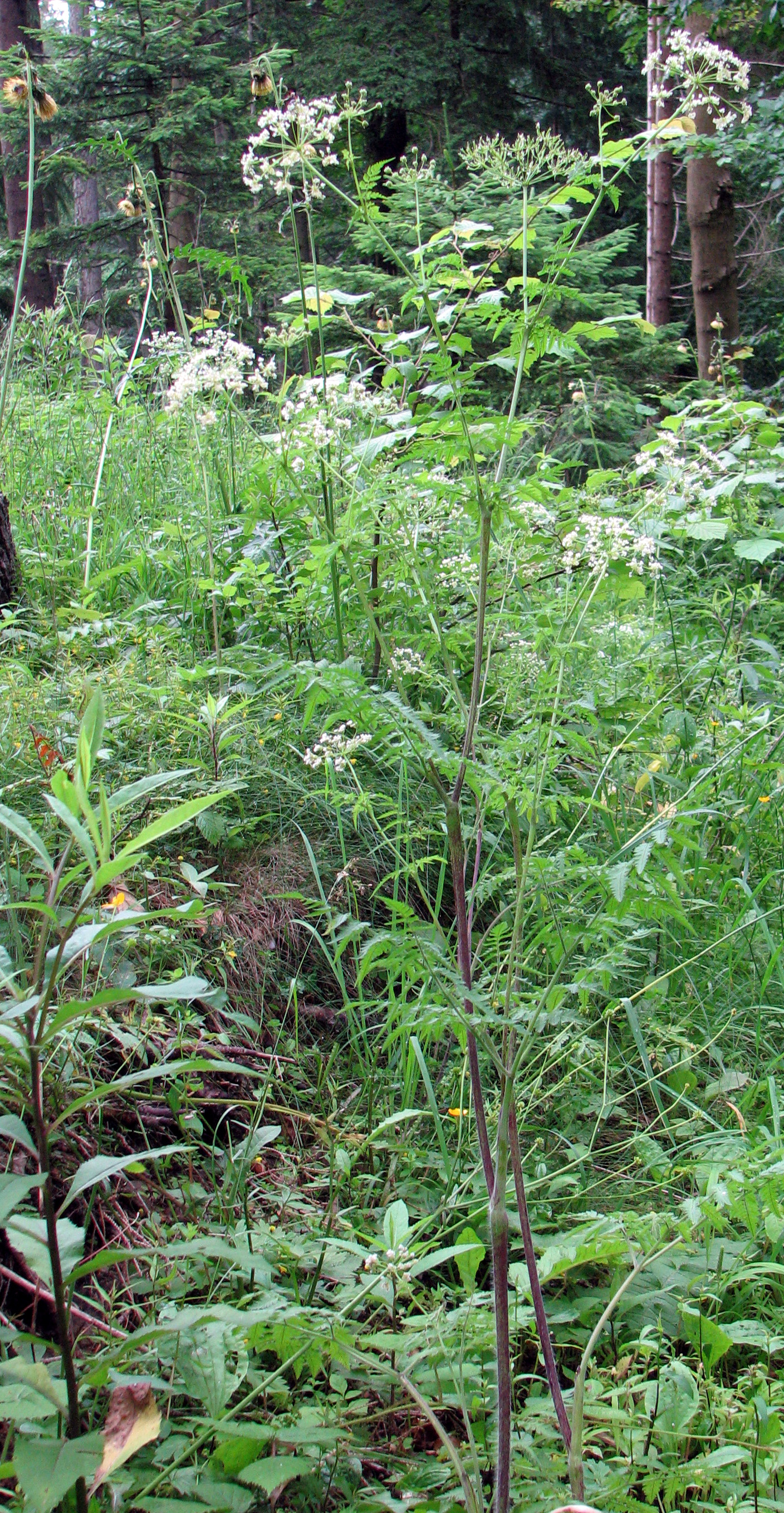

Scientific classification
- Kingdom: Plantae
- Clade: Tracheophytes
- Clade: Angiosperms
- Clade: Eudicots
- Clade: Asterids
- Order: Apiales
- Family: Apiaceae
- Genus: Chaerophyllum
- Species: C. aureum

Binomial name
- Chaerophyllum aureum L.

= Chaerophyllum aureum =

Species of flowering plant

Chaerophyllum aureum is a species of flowering plant belonging to the family Apiaceae.

Its native range is Central and Southern Europe, Crimea, Turkey to Iran.
