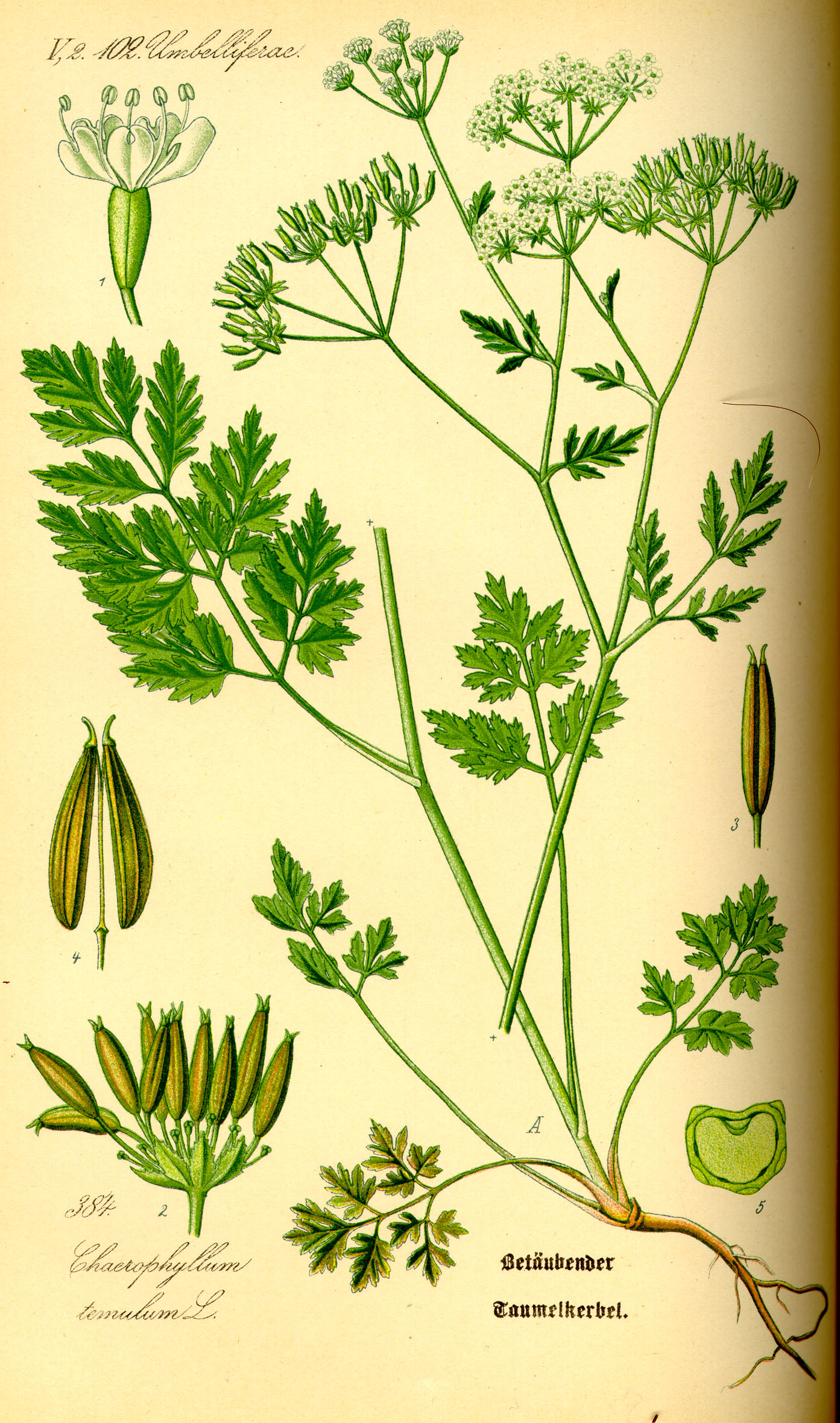

Scientific classification
- Kingdom: Plantae
- Clade: Tracheophytes
- Clade: Angiosperms
- Clade: Eudicots
- Clade: Asterids
- Order: Apiales
- Family: Apiaceae
- Genus: Chaerophyllum
- Species: C. temulum

Binomial name
- Chaerophyllum temulum L.

Synonyms
- Bellia temulenta Bubani nom. illeg.; Chaerophyllum geniculatum Gilib. nom. inval.; Chaerophyllum temulentum L.

= Chaerophyllum temulum =

Species of plant

Chaerophyllum temulum, the rough chervil, is a species of flowering plant in the family Apiaceae.

Unlike several other species in the genus, Chaerophyllum temulum is poisonous.

== Etymology ==
The generic name Chaerophyllum is a compound of the Greek elements chairo 'to please' and phyllon a leaf, giving the meaning 'having pleasant foliage'. The specific name temulum or temulentum means 'drunken' - from the similarity of the symptoms elicited by poisoning by the plant to those of alcoholic intoxication.

== Description ==
Somewhat hispid, biennial herb. Stems to 100 centimetres (39 in), solid, swollen below nodes, purple-spotted or wholly purple. Leaves bi- to tri-pinnate, dark green, appressed-hairy on both surfaces, longipetiolate: lobes mostly 10–20 millimetres (0.39–0.79 in), ovate in outline, deeply toothed, the teeth contracted abruptly at the apex. Umbels compound, bearing usually 6-12 (occasionally as few as 4 or as many as 15) hairy rays usually 1.5–5 centimetres (0.59–1.97 in) long; peduncle longer than rays, hairy; terminal umbel with mostly hermaphrodite flowers, overtopped by lateral umbels, which have mostly male flowers. Bracts absent, or rarely 1–2; bracteoles 5–8, shorter than pedicels, ciliate, eventually deflexed. Flowers white; sepals absent; outer petals not radiating; styles with enlarged base, forming stylopodium. Fruit usually 5–6 millimetres (0.20–0.24 in), slightly laterally compressed, oblong but narrowing toward apex, constricted at commissure; mericarps having broad, rounded ridges; carpophore present; vittae solitary, conspicuous; pedicels without a ring of hairs at apex; styles roughly as long as stylopodium, recurved; stigma capitate. Cotyledons tapered gradually at base without distinct petiole. Flowering time (in U.K.) : late May to early July.

== Ploidy ==
Chromosome number of Chaerophyllum temulum and infraspecific taxa 2n = 14, 22.

== Distribution ==
Chaerophyllum temulum is found throughout most of Europe, although it is rare in the Mediterranean region. Its range also extends into the Maghreb and Western Asia, including Turkey and the Caucasus. Within the United Kingdom the plant is common in most of England and Wales, but local and mainly Eastern in distribution in Scotland. In Ireland the plant is local and confined mainly to the Eastern half of the country. In much of England the plant is distinguishable from other Umbelliferae by being the first of the common roadside species to flower after Anthriscus sylvestris, with other distinguishing features including hairy, purple-spotted stems and swollen tops to the internodes.

== Habitat ==
Chaerophyllum temulum is a ruderal or pioneer species which will grow in a variety of situations, from damp places, such as waterside thickets, to open woodland, woodland edges, waste places, by walls and fences, in both lowland and hilly country.

== Ecology ==
Pollen is collected by solitary bees.

== Toxicity ==
Chaerophyllum temulum contains (mainly in the upper parts and fruits) a volatile alkaloid chaerophylline, as well as other (probably glycosidally bound) toxins, the chemistry and pharmacology of which has, as yet, been but little studied. Externally, the sap of the plant can cause inflammation of the skin and persistent rashes. If consumed, the plant causes gastro-intestinal inflammation, drowsiness, vertigo and cardiac weakness. Human poisonings have seldom been observed, because the plant lacks aromatic essential oils that could lead to its being confused with edible umbellifers used to flavour food. It is, however, used occasionally in folk medicine. Animal poisonings by the plant are commoner than those of humans, pigs and cattle thus intoxicated exhibiting a staggering gait, unsteady stance, apathy and severe, exhausting colic, ending sometimes in death. Such symptoms recall those caused by the toxic grass Lolium temulentum, the common darnel. Chaerophyllum bulbosum and Chaerophyllum hirsutum have also been reported to be toxic. Chaerophyllum temulum has been reported to contain the polyyne falcarinol and the compound falcarinone.

== Use in herbal medicine ==
Chaerophyllum temulum has been used in folk medicine, in small doses, to treat arthritis, dropsy, and chronic skin complaints, and as a spring tonic. The early modern physician Boerhaave (1668–1738) once successfully used a decoction of the herb combined with Sarsaparilla to treat a woman suffering from leprosy – in the course of which treatment temporary blindness was a severe side effect following each dose.
