= Phyllomacromia kimminsi =

Conservation status
- Least Concern (IUCN 3.1)

Scientific classification
- Kingdom: Animalia
- Phylum: Arthropoda
- Class: Insecta
- Order: Odonata
- Infraorder: Anisoptera
- Family: Macromiidae
- Genus: Phyllomacromia
- Species: P. kimminsi

Binomial name
- Phyllomacromia kimminsi (Fraser, 1954)

Species of dragonfly

Phyllomacromia kimminsi is a species of dragonfly in the family Macromiidae. It is found in Botswana, Ivory Coast, Kenya, Sierra Leone, Uganda, and Zambia. Its natural habitats are subtropical or tropical moist lowland forests and rivers.
