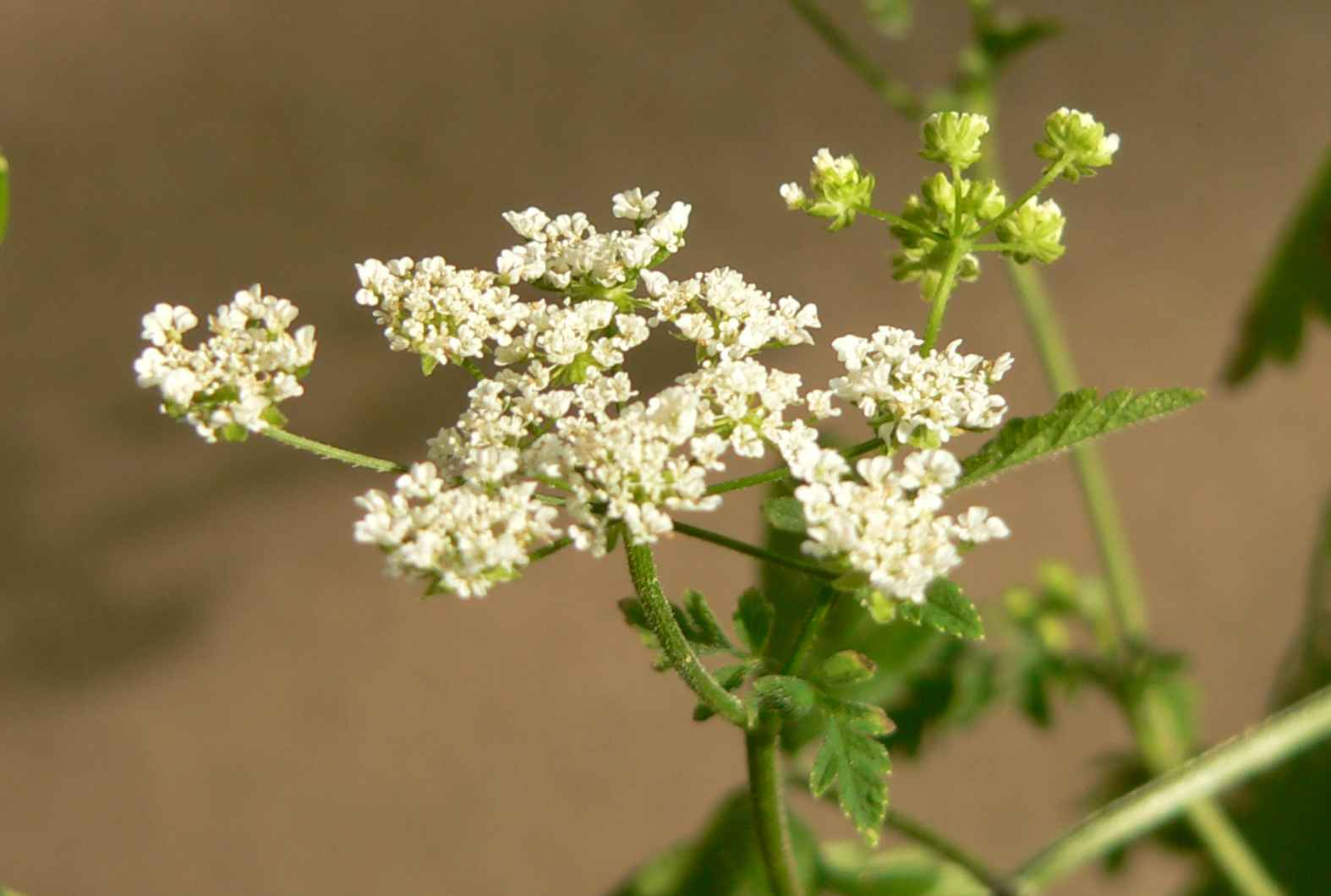
- Chaerophyllum temulum

Scientific classification
- Kingdom: Plantae
- Clade: Tracheophytes
- Clade: Angiosperms
- Clade: Eudicots
- Clade: Asterids
- Order: Apiales
- Family: Apiaceae
- Subfamily: Apioideae
- Tribe: Scandiceae
- Subtribe: Scandicinae
- Genus: Chaerophyllum; L.

Synonyms
- Apotaenium Koso-Pol.; Bellia Bubani; Blephixis Raf.; Caldasia Lag.; Chamaemyrrhis Endl. ex Heynh.; Chrysophae Koso-Pol.; Croaspila Raf.; Fiebera Opiz; Golenkinianthe Koso-Pol.; Lindera Adans.; Myrrhoides Heist. ex Fabr.; Oreomyrrhis Endl.; Physocaulis Tausch; Polgidon Raf.; Rhynchostylis Tausch; Sikira Raf.

= Chaerophyllum =

Genus of flowering plants

Chaerophyllum is a genus of flowering plant in the family Apiaceae, with 35 species native to Europe, Asia, North America, and northern Africa. It includes the cultivated root vegetable Chaerophyllum bulbosum (turnip rooted chervil).

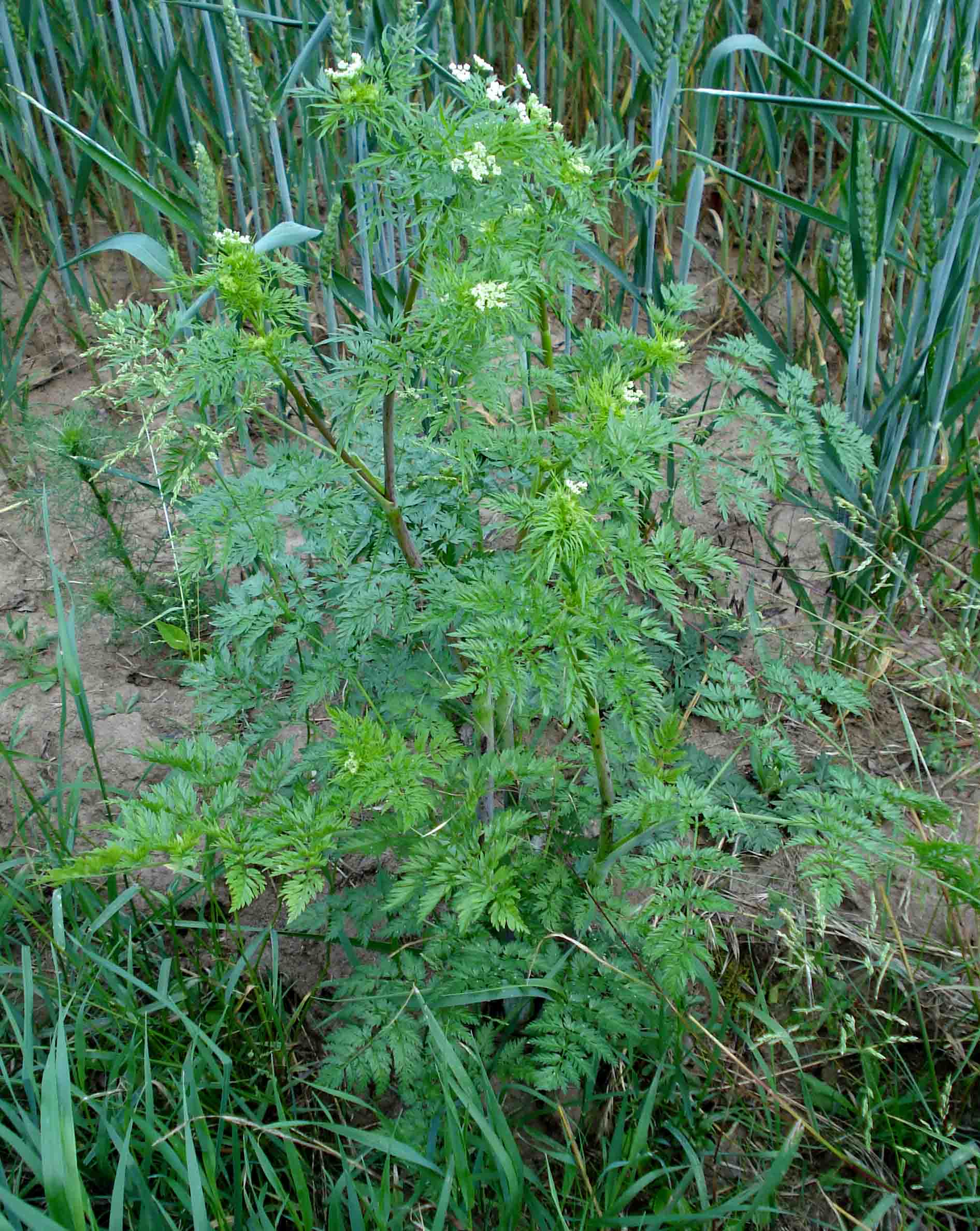
Chaerophyllum bulbosum

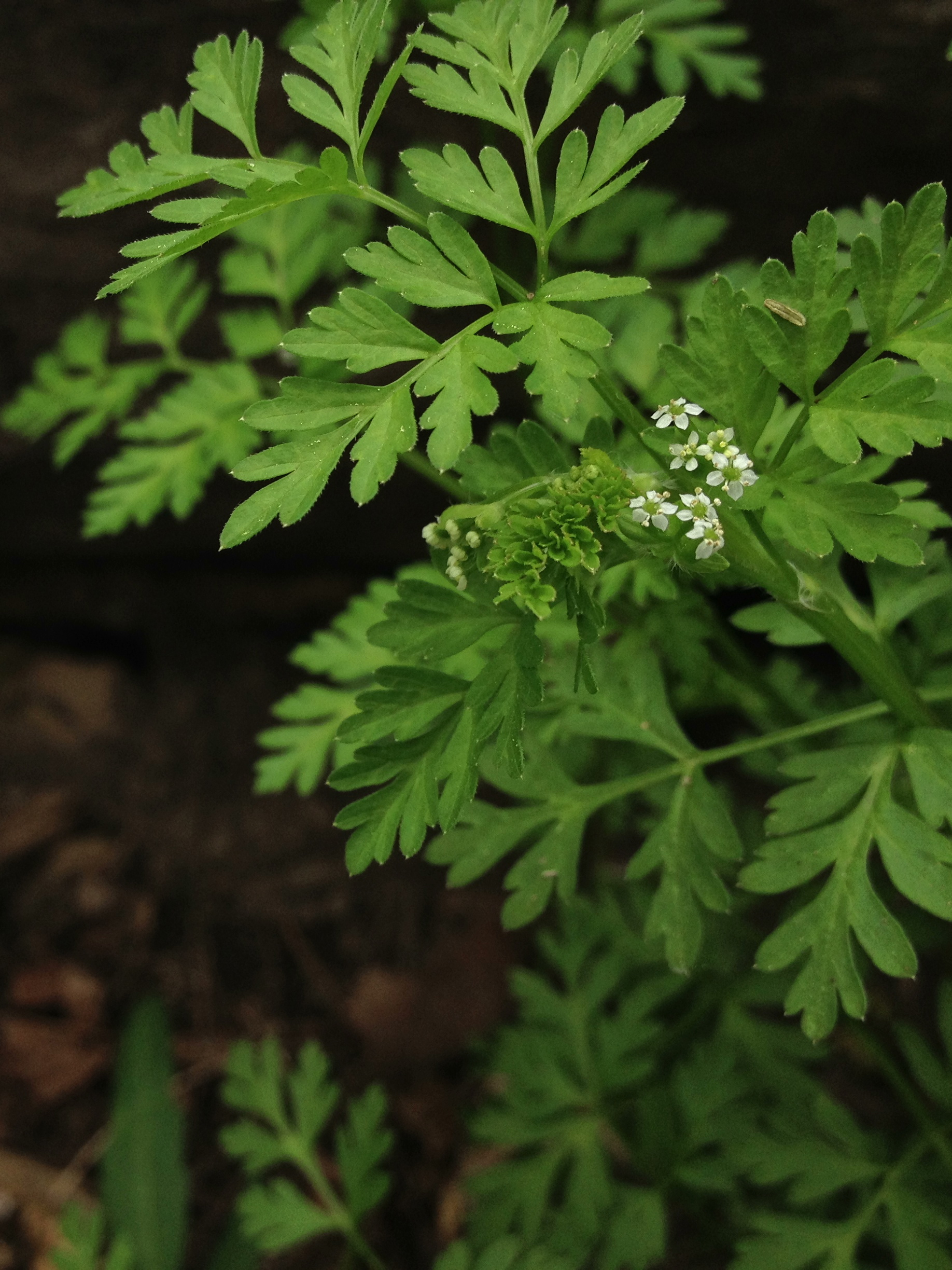
Chaerophyllum procumbens

The genus name is an alteration of Latin chaerephyllum, from Ancient Greek χαιρέφυλλον (khairéphullon "chervil"), from χαίρω (khaírō "to be glad") and φύλλον (phúllon "leaf").

== Species ==
As of December 2022, Plants of the World Online accepted 69 species:

- Chaerophyllum aksekiense A.Duran & H.Duman
- Chaerophyllum andicola (Kunth) K.F.Chung
- Chaerophyllum angelicifolium M.Bieb.
- Chaerophyllum argenteum (Hook.f.) K.F.Chung
- Chaerophyllum aromaticum L.
- Chaerophyllum astrantiae Boiss. & Balansa
- Chaerophyllum atlanticum Coss. ex Batt.
- Chaerophyllum aurantiacum Post
- Chaerophyllum aureum L.
- Chaerophyllum australianum K.F.Chung
- Chaerophyllum azorellaceum (Buwalda) K.F.Chung
- Chaerophyllum azoricum Trel.
- Chaerophyllum basicola (Heenan & Molloy) K.F.Chung
- Chaerophyllum bobrovii Schischk.
- Chaerophyllum borneense (Merr.) K.F.Chung
- Chaerophyllum borodinii Albov
- Chaerophyllum brevipes (Mathias & Constance) K.F.Chung
- Chaerophyllum bulbosum L.
- Chaerophyllum buwaldianum (Mathias & Constance) K.F.Chung
- Chaerophyllum byzantinum Boiss.
- Chaerophyllum colensoi (Hook.f.) K.F.Chung
- Chaerophyllum coloratum L.
- Chaerophyllum confusum Woronow ex Grossh.
- Chaerophyllum creticum Boiss. & Heldr.
- Chaerophyllum crinitum Boiss.
- Chaerophyllum dasycarpum (Hook. ex S.Watson) Nutt. ex Bush
- Chaerophyllum daucoides (d'Urv.) K.F.Chung
- Chaerophyllum elegans Gaudin
- Chaerophyllum eriopodum (DC.) K.F.Chung
- Chaerophyllum guatemalense K.F.Chung
- Chaerophyllum gunnii (Mathias & Constance) K.F.Chung
- Chaerophyllum hakkiaricum Hedge & Lamond
- Chaerophyllum heldreichii Orph.
- Chaerophyllum hirsutum L.
- Chaerophyllum humile M.Bieb.
- Chaerophyllum involucratum (Hayata) K.F.Chung
- Chaerophyllum karsianum Kit Tan & Ocakv.
- Chaerophyllum khorossanicum Czerniak. ex Schischk.
- Chaerophyllum leucolaenum Boiss.
- Chaerophyllum libanoticum Boiss. & Kotschy
- Chaerophyllum lineare (Hemsl.) K.F.Chung
- Chaerophyllum macropodum Boiss.
- Chaerophyllum macrospermum (Willd. ex Schult.) Fisch. & C.A.Mey. ex Hohen.
- Chaerophyllum meyeri Boiss. & Buhse
- Chaerophyllum nanhuense (Chih H.Chen & J.C.Wang) K.F.Chung
- Chaerophyllum nivale Hedge & Lamond
- Chaerophyllum nodosum (L.) Crantz
- Chaerophyllum novae-zelandiae K.F.Chung
- Chaerophyllum orizabae (I.M.Johnst.) K.F.Chung
- Chaerophyllum papuanum (Buwalda) K.F.Chung
- Chaerophyllum plicatum (Mathias & Constance) K.F.Chung
- Chaerophyllum posofianum Erik & Demirkus
- Chaerophyllum prescottii DC.
- Chaerophyllum procumbens (L.) Crantz
- Chaerophyllum pulvinificum (F.Muell.) K.F.Chung
- Chaerophyllum pumilum (Ridl.) K.F.Chung
- Chaerophyllum ramosum (Hook.f.) K.F.Chung
- Chaerophyllum reflexum Lindl.
- Chaerophyllum roseum M.Bieb.
- Chaerophyllum rubellum Albov
- Chaerophyllum sessiliflorum (Hook.f.) K.F.Chung
- Chaerophyllum syriacum Heldr. & Ehrenb. ex Boiss.
- Chaerophyllum tainturieri Hook. & Arn.
- Chaerophyllum taiwanianum (Masam.) K.F.Chung
- Chaerophyllum temulum L.
- Chaerophyllum tenuifolium Poir.
- Chaerophyllum tolucanum (I.M.Johnst.) K.F.Chung
- Chaerophyllum villarsii W.D.J.Koch
- Chaerophyllum villosum Wall. ex DC.
