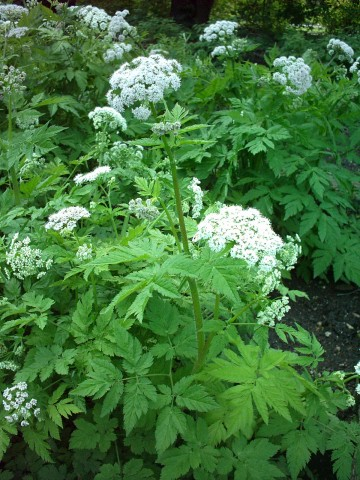

Scientific classification
- Kingdom: Plantae
- Clade: Tracheophytes
- Clade: Angiosperms
- Clade: Eudicots
- Clade: Asterids
- Order: Apiales
- Family: Apiaceae
- Genus: Chaerophyllum
- Species: C. hirsutum

Binomial name
- Chaerophyllum hirsutum L.

= Chaerophyllum hirsutum =

Species of flowering plant

Chaerophyllum hirsutum, hairy chervil, is a species of flowering plant belonging to the parsley family Apiaceae.

Growing to 1 m (3.3 ft) tall, this herbaceous perennial resembles cow parsley, with apple-scented ferny foliage and umbels of white flowers in May and June.

Its native range is Central and Southern Europe to Ukraine.

A cultivar 'Roseum', with pale pink flowers, is widely cultivated as an ornamental.
