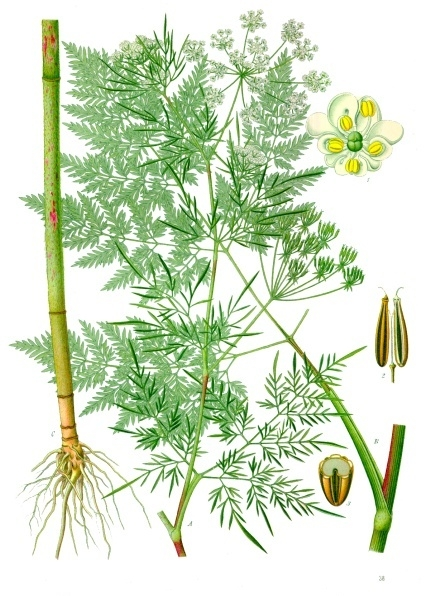

Scientific classification
- Kingdom: Plantae
- Clade: Embryophytes
- Clade: Tracheophytes
- Clade: Angiosperms
- Clade: Eudicots
- Clade: Asterids
- Order: Apiales
- Family: Apiaceae
- Genus: Chaerophyllum
- Species: C. bulbosum

Binomial name
- Chaerophyllum bulbosum L.

Synonyms
- Chaerophyllum caucasicum (Fisch. & Hoffm.) Schischk.; Chaerophyllum laevigatum Vis.; Chaerophyllum neglectum N.W.Zinger; Chaerophyllum rapaceum Alef.; Chaerophyllum verticillatum Pers.

= Chaerophyllum bulbosum =

Species of flowering plant

Chaerophyllum bulbosum is a species of flowering plant from the carrot family and known by several common names, including turnip-rooted chervil, tuberous-rooted chervil, bulbous chervil, and parsnip chervil. It is native to Europe and Western Asia. It was a popular vegetable in the 19th century.

This is a tall annual herb with fringelike divided leaves and large umbels of white flowers. The plant is cultivated on a small scale in parts of Europe for the edible tubers, which look like a dark gray carrot with yellowish-white flesh. After the harvest they are stored for a few months under cold conditions. During storage, sugar content increases through hydrolysis of starch by amylases.

== Description ==
=== Vegetative features ===
Chaerophyllum bulbosum is a biennial plant. In the first year, its rosette of leaves produces large amounts of starch, which are stored in the taproot to provide energy for the plant to flower in the second year. In the second year, it grows up to a height of 70 cm to > 2 m.

The stem is smooth with nodes at intervals. It is hairy around the base just above the ground and may show scattered red spots. Additionally, the lower stem is often blue-rimmed.

Subsequent leaves are alternate (with a single leaf attached to a node), spirally arranged, and pinnately compound, with leaf bases sheathing the stem. As the plant grows, the bases of the seed leaves, near the taproot, are pushed apart. The stem, located just above the ground, is compressed and the internodes are not distinct. When the seed stalk elongates for flowering, the tip of the stem narrows and becomes pointed, and the stem extends upward to become a highly branched inflorescence.

=== Flower features ===
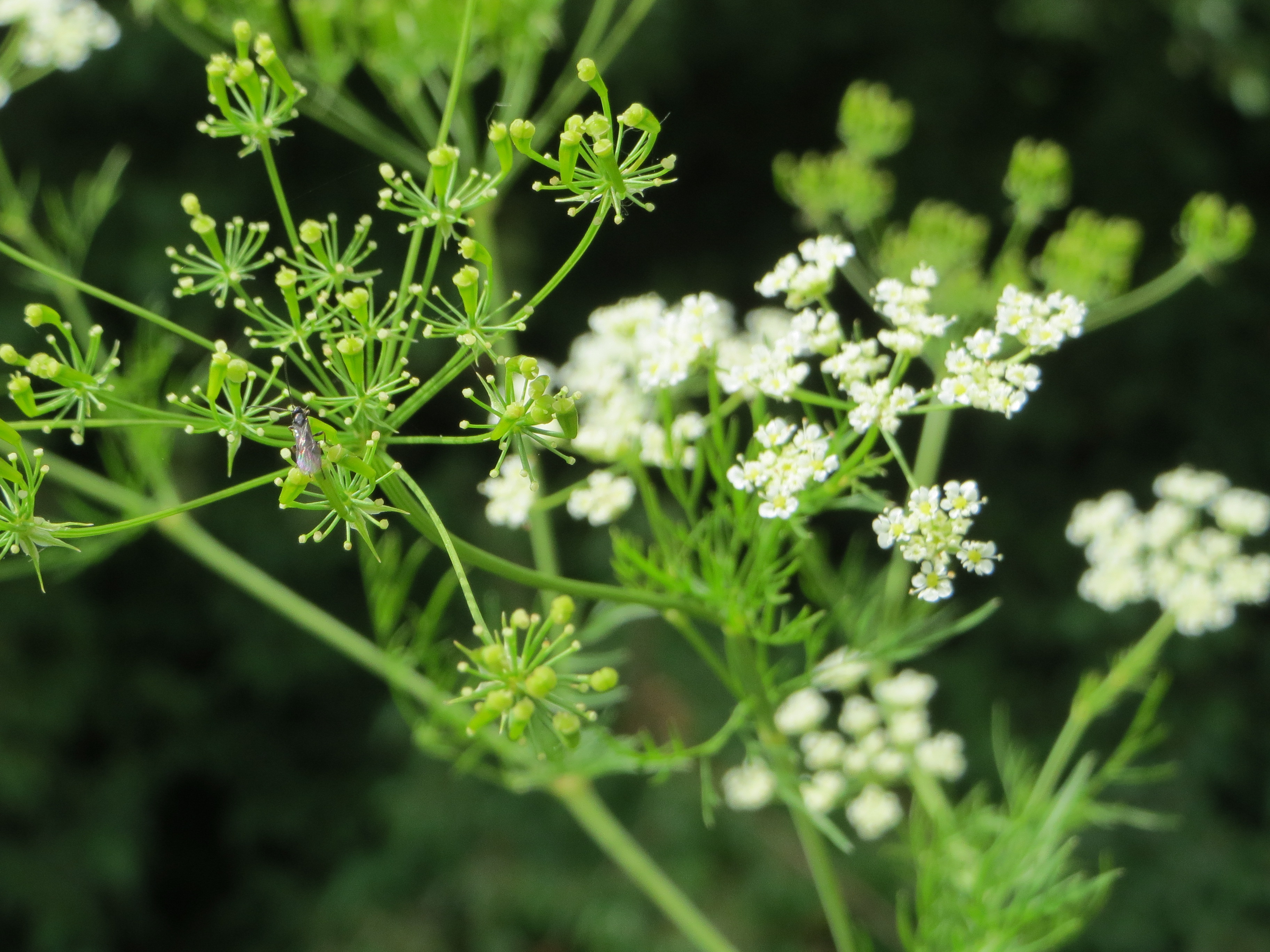
Fruiting umbellets in the foreground and male flower umbellets in the background.

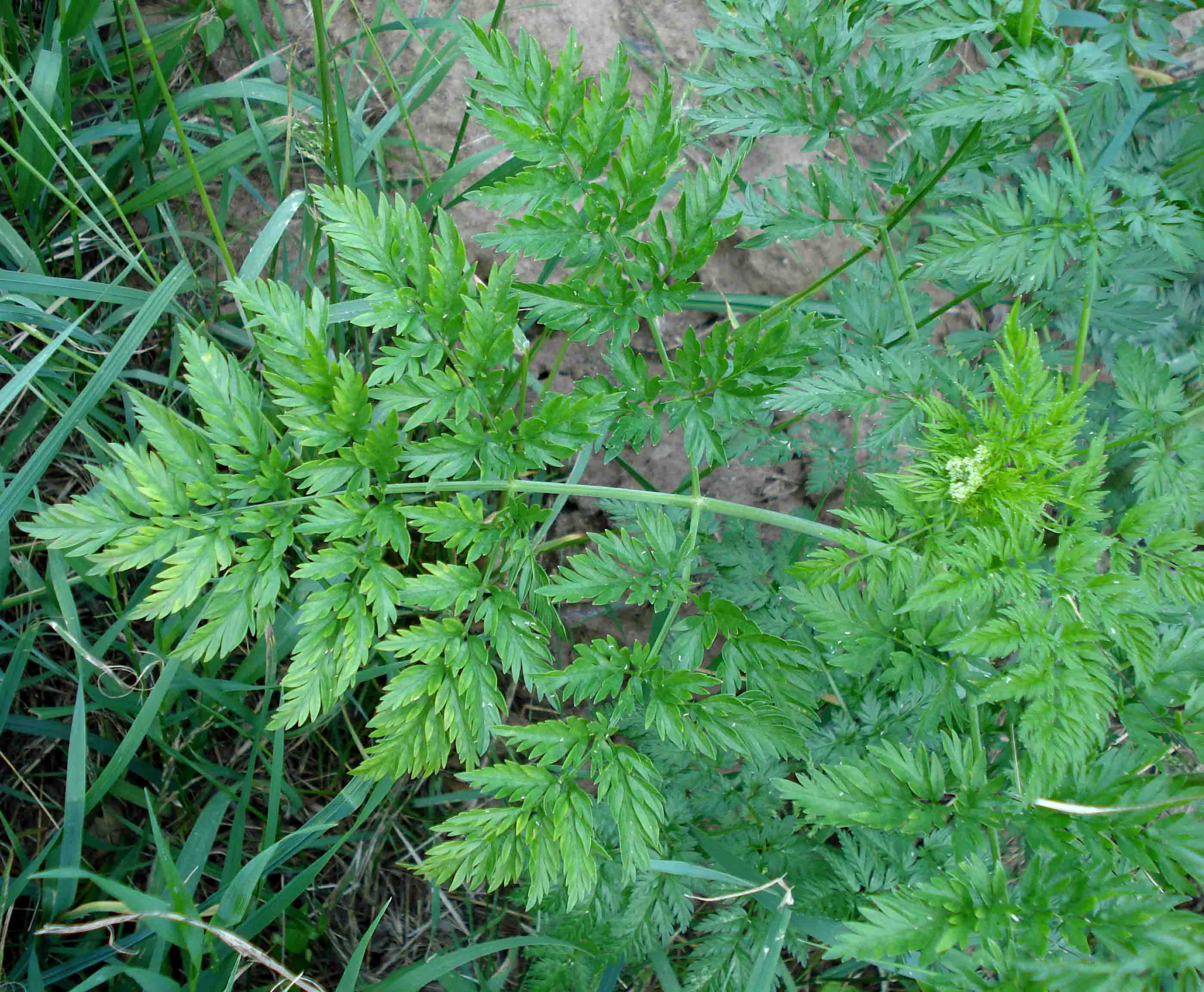
Alternate, compound leaves

Characteristic of an Apiaceae plant, Chaerophyllum bulbosum individuals produce 10 - 200 umbels. A total of 1,000 - 36,000 flowers are produced per plant. The flowers are protandrous. The styles only elongate after pollen is shed, which prevents selfing almost completely under wild, optimal pollination conditions. Chaerophyllum bulbosum is an andromonoecious plant, which means that the hermaphrodite and male flowers occur on the same plant. The sex ratio between functionally male and hermaphrodite flowers is about 80% to 20%.

World native distribution of Chaerophyllum bulbosum

== Wild populations ==
Native, wild populations are distributed in Europe from Ukraine to France and from Sweden to Italy. In France and Germany, wild populations can be found in the Rhine and the Weser River basins. It can also be found in Western Asia as in Turkey and Caucasus. In the wild, tuberous-rooted chervil grows in dense populations, mainly along river banks. Seeds are dispersed by hydrochory.

== Breeding ==
The plant has been grown since the Middle Ages but only survived as a garden crop in France without any named varieties. However, the first named cultivar in modern times seems to have been developed in France, named "Altan" (1986), followed by new cultivars "Véga" and "M4.10." The new varieties are mainly characterized by low seed embryo dormancy.

== Use ==
It is otherwise used in cuisine for flavoring or cooked like other root vegetables. Much of the flavor comes from the skin of the tuber. The aroma intensifies the longer the plant is stored. Eaten raw, the taste is somewhat sharp like radish, but the cooked tuber gives a subtle taste of potatoes and chestnuts with a slightly pungent taste of celery and parsnip. C. bulbosum roots are high in fiber and have the same starchy quality as potatoes. They contain vitamins B and C and mineral salts.

== Origin and history ==
Tuberous-rooted chervil (Chaerophyllum bulbosum) is native to middle- and south-eastern-Europe. During the 1580s, tubers of tuberous-rooted chervil were found at the local market in Wien. In 1846, the tubers arrived in France. 16 years later, the tubers became even more prominent due to Phytophthora infestans, late blight of potatoes, and had been increasingly cultivated as a substitute for potatoes. At the end of the 20th century breeding programs focused on this alternative crop mainly due to its delicate flavor. Through breeding achievements of French scientists, this alternative crop gained agricultural importance in regions like Loire Valley (France) and the north of Brittany.

== Cultivation ==
The cultivation is similar to carrots and parsnips. An adequate site for cultivation is characterized by light and fertile soils. The soil should be moderately moist. Cultivation period is from 9 up to 10 months. The seeds require exposure to cold temperatures (vernalization) to break dormancy in spring. The crop cultivation starts therefore in the autumn. The dormancy ends with at least 8 weeks of continuous humidity and temperatures below 5 °C. After stratification, germination is at optimum with a temperature range between 5 and 10 °C. At temperatures above 25 to 30 °C significant germination inhibition occurs. Sowing is done directly, without any seedling cultivation, from September to November. Distance between rows is usually from 20 up to 25 cm with a distance of 4 to 6 cm between seeds. In the first year of growth, after sprouting in spring, the tuber develops with a leaf rosette just above ground. Voles are a common pest for this crop in the field.

Harvest

Root maturity is reached when leaves turn yellow in June. The main harvest time starts in July and lasts until September. Due to the requirement of a dormancy period, it is almost mandatory to sow the seeds directly after harvest for the upcoming season. Because of this, and due to the low yield and poor germination of the seeds, Chaerophyllum bulbosum has hardly spread in commercial cultivation.

Propagation

Sexual propagation through saving seeds, after harvest of the roots, is the main method of propagation. The seeds are short-lived, which means that the seeds lose their vitality easily (especially in dry seed packets); therefore, fresh seeds should be used every year. Keeping the seeds in cool and slightly damp sand might help sustain their vitality.

Pollinators for Chaerophyllum bulbosum includes flies and beetles.

Diseases

Similar diseases as for carrots and parsnip and other Apiaceae can occur for tuberous-rooted chervil. These are mainly the carrot fly, storage decay and root aphids. Furthermore, it can be host for other aphids, erysiphe heraclei or celery mosaic virus.

== Gallery ==
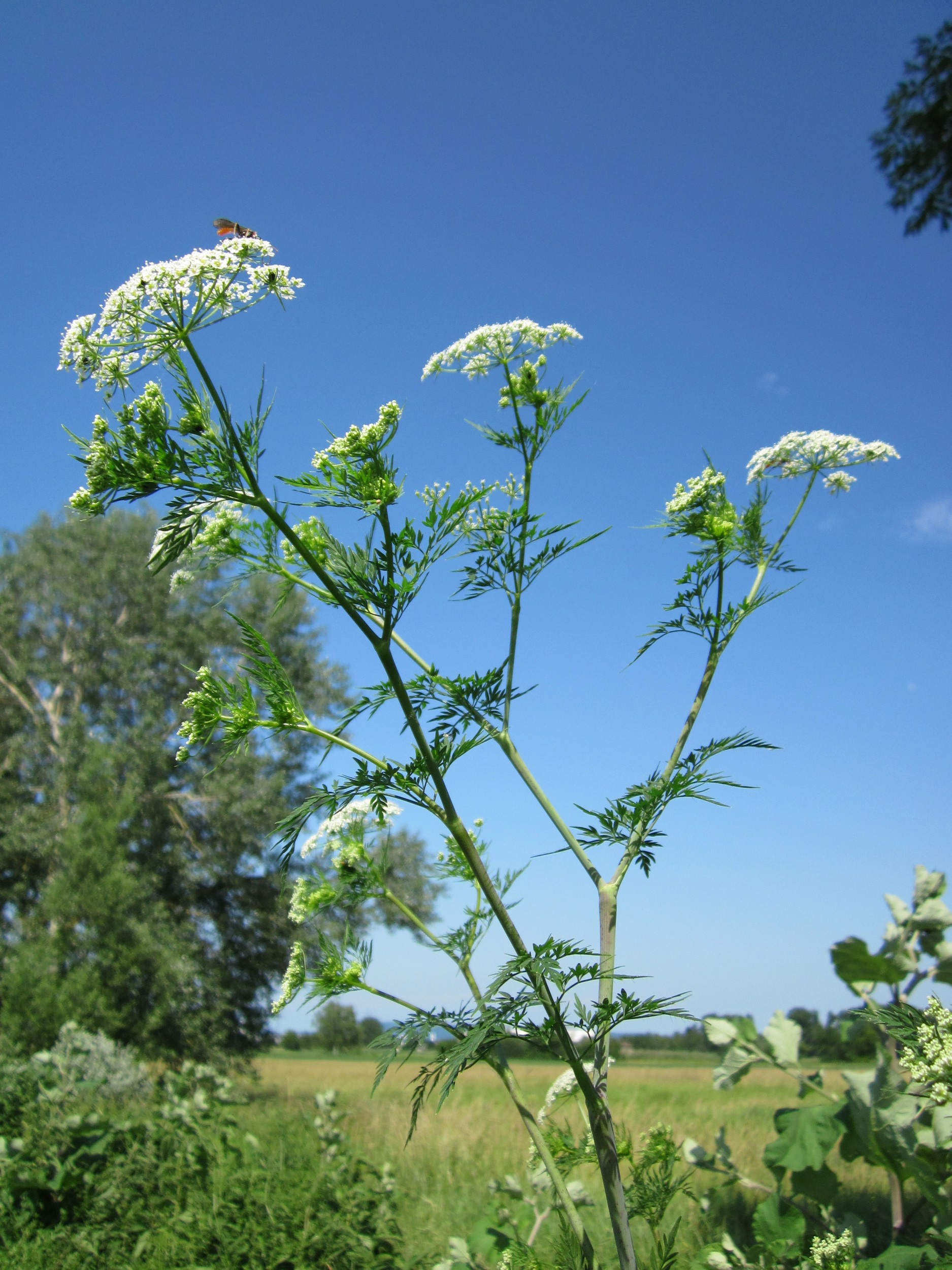

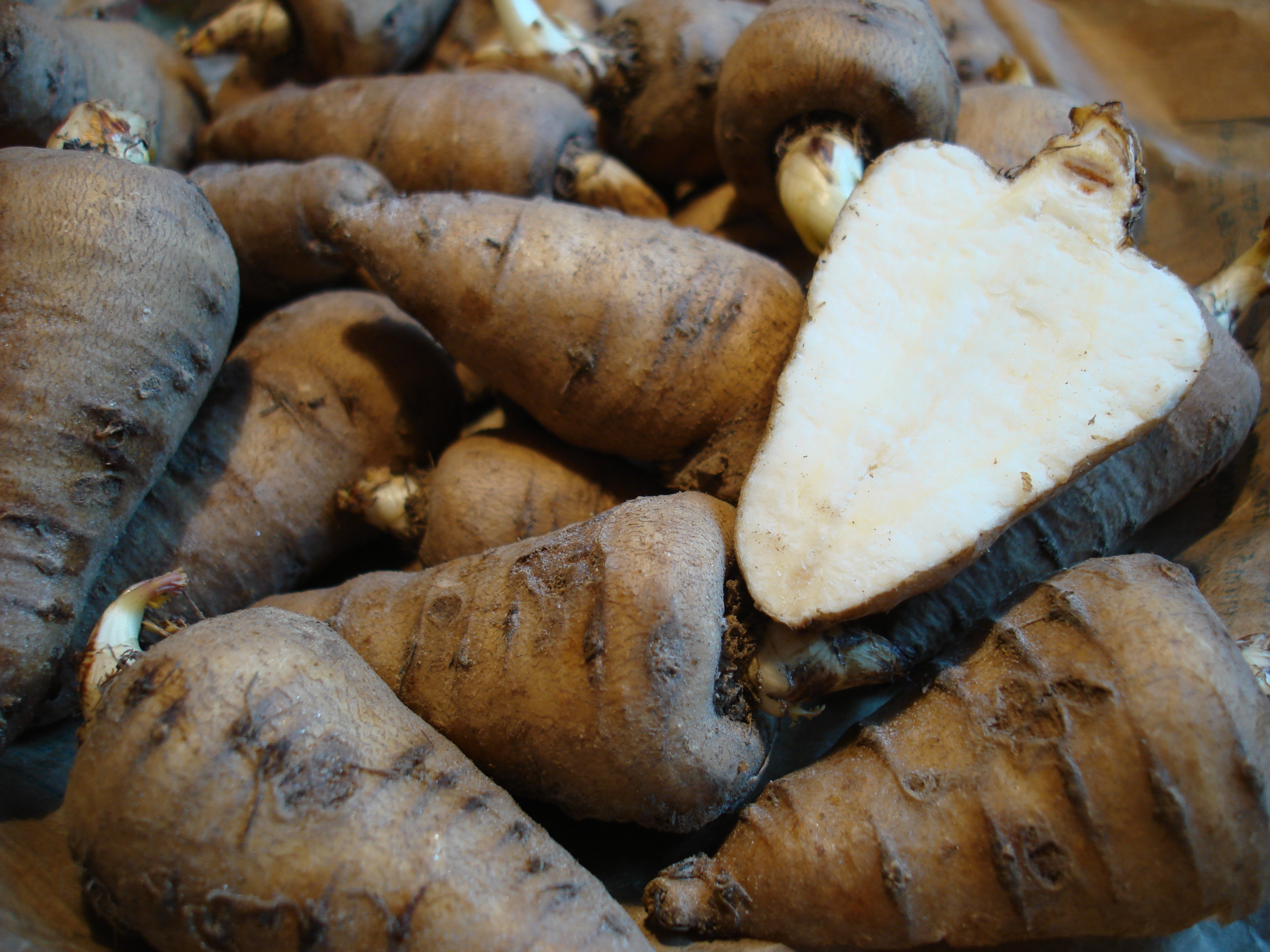

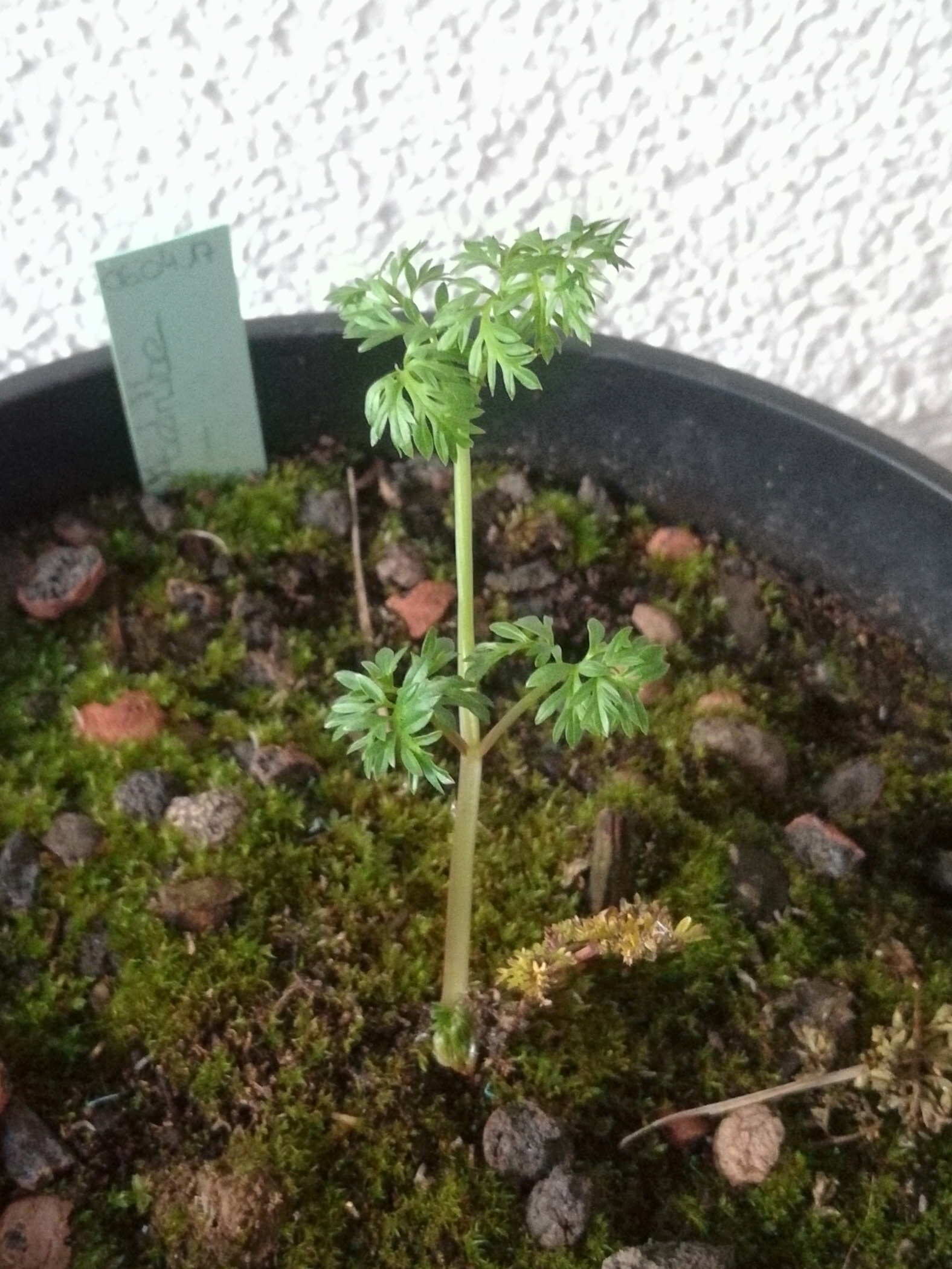
