= List of dragonflies (Macromiidae) =

This is a list of dragonflies in the family Macromiidae.

== List ==
- Didymops floridensis
- Didymops transversa
- Epophthalmia australis
- Epophthalmia elegans
- Epophthalmia frontalis
- Epophthalmia kuani
- Epophthalmia vittata
- Epophthalmia vittigera
- Macromia aculeata
- Macromia alleghaniensis
- Macromia amphigena
- Macromia amymone
- Macromia annulata
- Macromia arachnomima
- Macromia astarte
- Macromia bartenevi
- Macromia berlandi
- Macromia calliope
- Macromia callisto
- Macromia celaeno
- Macromia celebia
- Macromia chaiyaphumensis
- Macromia chalciope
- Macromia chui
- Macromia cincta
- Macromia cingulata
- Macromia clio
- Macromia corycia
- Macromia cupricincta
- Macromia cydippe
- Macromia daimoji
- Macromia dione
- Macromia ellisoni
- Macromia erato
- Macromia euphrosyne
- Macromia eurynome
- Macromia euterpe
- Macromia flavicincta
- Macromia flavocolorata
- Macromia flavovittata
- Macromia flinti
- Macromia fulgidifrons
- Macromia gerstaeckeri
- Macromia hamata
- Macromia hermione
- Macromia holthuisi
- Macromia icterica
- Macromia ida
- Macromia illinoiensis
- Macromia indica
- Macromia irata
- Macromia irina
- Macromia jucunda
- Macromia katae
- Macromia kiautai
- Macromia kubokaiya
- Macromia lachesis
- Macromia macula
- Macromia magnifica
- Macromia malleifera
- Macromia manchurica
- Macromia margarita
- Macromia melpomene
- Macromia miniata
- Macromia mnemosyne
- Macromia moorei
- Macromia negrito
- Macromia pacifica
- Macromia pallida
- Macromia pinratani
- Macromia polyhymnia
- Macromia pyramidalis
- Macromia septima
- Macromia sombui
- Macromia sophrosyne
- Macromia splendens
- Macromia taeniolata
- Macromia terpsichore
- Macromia tillyardi
- Macromia urania
- Macromia viridescens
- Macromia westwoodii
- Macromia whitei
- Macromia yunnanensis
- Macromia zeylanica
- Phyllomacromia aeneothorax
- Phyllomacromia aequatorialis
- Phyllomacromia amicorum
- Phyllomacromia aureozona
- Phyllomacromia bicristulata
- Phyllomacromia bifasciata
- Phyllomacromia bispina
- Phyllomacromia caneri
- Phyllomacromia congolica
- Phyllomacromia flavimitella
- Phyllomacromia funicularia
- Phyllomacromia funicularioides
- Phyllomacromia gamblesi
- Phyllomacromia girardi
- Phyllomacromia hervei
- Phyllomacromia kimminsi
- Phyllomacromia lamottei
- Phyllomacromia legrandi
- Phyllomacromia maesi
- Phyllomacromia melania
- Phyllomacromia monoceros
- Phyllomacromia nigeriensis
- Phyllomacromia nyanzana
- Phyllomacromia occidentalis
- Phyllomacromia onerata
- Phyllomacromia overlaeti
- Phyllomacromia pallidinervis
- Phyllomacromia paludosa
- Phyllomacromia paula
- Phyllomacromia picta
- Phyllomacromia pseudafricana
- Phyllomacromia royi
- Phyllomacromia seydeli
- Phyllomacromia sophia
- Phyllomacromia subtropicalis
- Phyllomacromia sylvatica
- Phyllomacromia trifasciata
- Phyllomacromia unifasciata
- Phyllomacromia villiersi
