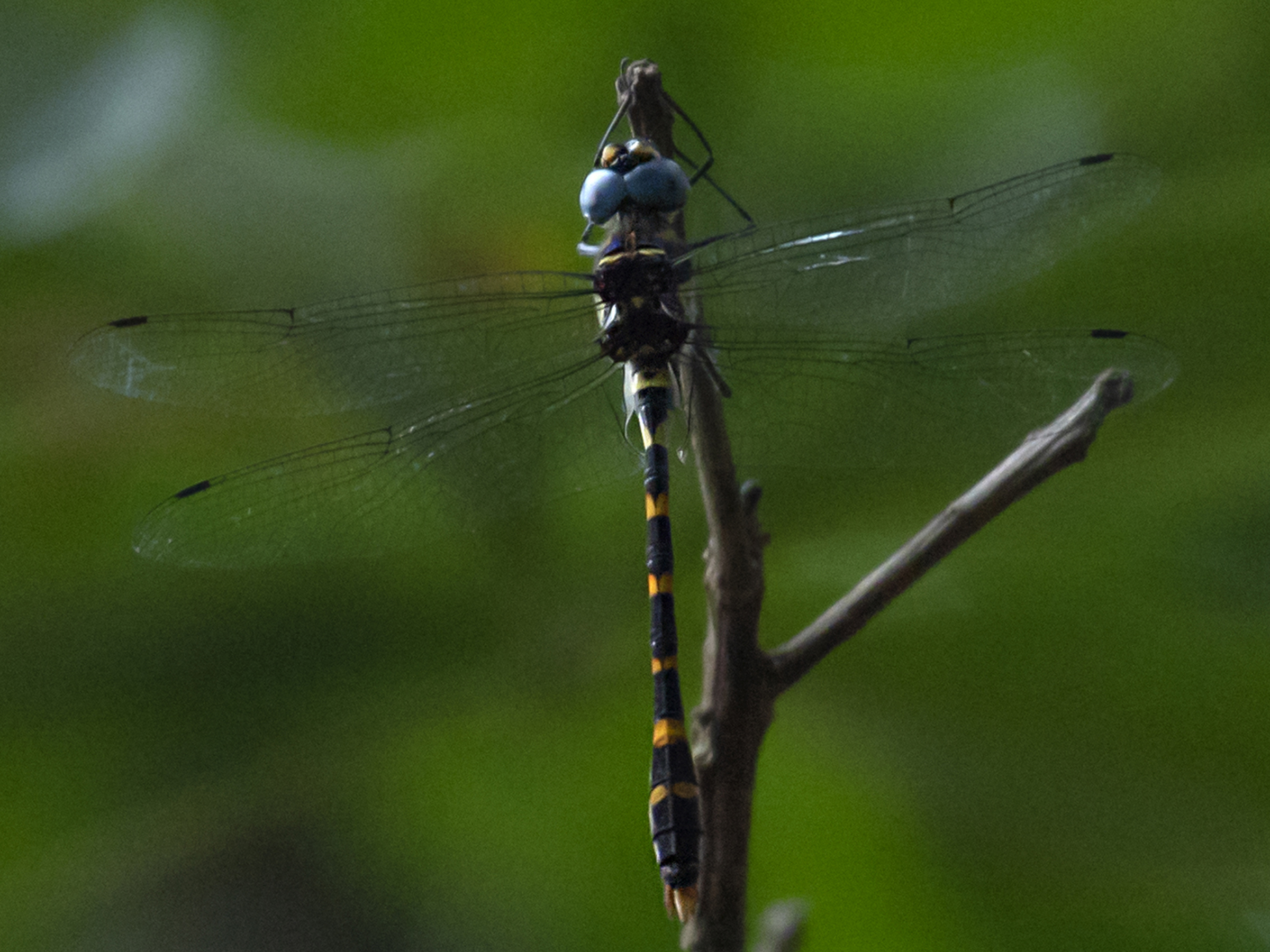

Conservation status
- Least Concern (IUCN 3.1)

Scientific classification
- Kingdom: Animalia
- Phylum: Arthropoda
- Class: Insecta
- Order: Odonata
- Infraorder: Anisoptera
- Family: Macromiidae
- Genus: Macromia
- Species: M. bellicosa

Binomial name
- Macromia bellicosa Fraser, 1924

= Macromia bellicosa =

Species of dragonfly

Macromia bellicosa is a species of dragonfly in the family Macromiidae. It is an endemic dragonfly and found only in Western Ghats in South India. It breeds in hill streams.

== Description ==
It is a medium-sized dragonfly with greenish eyes. Its thorax is metallic bluish-green marked with citron-yellow. There is a short humeral stripe, an oblique narrow stripe on mesepimeron, a narrow stripe on the posterior border of metepimeron, and a narrow stripe traversing the sinus. Abdomen is black, marked with citron-yellow. There is a broad basal annule on segment 2 separated from the base on mid-dorsum and laterally by two black spots. Segment 3 has a narrow annule and a large baso-lateral spot. Segments 4 to 6 have similar but gradually narrowing annules. Segment 7 has the basal half yellow. Segment 8 has a very narrow basal ring. Segments 9 and 10 are unmarked. Anal appendages are dark ochreous.

It can be distinguished from Macromia flavicincta by the restricted yellow markings here.

== See also ==
- List of odonates of India
- List of odonata of Kerala
