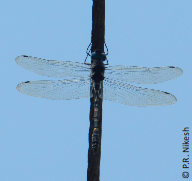
- from Thattekkad, Kerala

Conservation status
- Least Concern (IUCN 3.1)

Scientific classification
- Kingdom: Animalia
- Phylum: Arthropoda
- Class: Insecta
- Order: Odonata
- Infraorder: Anisoptera
- Family: Macromiidae
- Genus: Macromia
- Species: M. annaimallaiensis

Binomial name
- Macromia annaimallaiensis Fraser, 1931

= Macromia annaimallaiensis =

Species of dragonfly

Macromia annaimallaiensis is a species of dragonfly in the family Macromiidae. It is an endemic dragonfly and found only in Western Ghats in South India, south of Palakkad Gap.

== Description and habitat ==
It is a medium-sized dragonfly with emerald-green eyes. Its thorax is reddish-brown, with a dark green metallic reflex. There is a narrow oblique stripe on each side in citron-yellow. Abdomen is black, with the yellow annules narrower compared to Macromia indica. Segment 2 has a very narrow sub-basal annule which is broadly interrupted each side sub-dorsally. Segment 3 has a narrow annule. Segments 4 and 5 have a pair of small dorsal spots at the jugal suture. Segment 6 usually unmarked. Segment 7 has a basal annule. Segments 8 and 9 are unmarked. Segment 10 has a mid-dorsal carina as in Macromia indica. Anal appendages are black.

It can be distinguished from M. indica by the very different markings of abdomen. These abdominal markings are similar to those of M. ellisoni; but that insect has a well-marked citron-yellow humeral stripe which is very narrow here.

It is commonly found hawking on the banks of rivers south of Palakkad Gap. It breeds in hill streams.

== See also ==
- List of odonates of India
- List of odonata of Kerala
