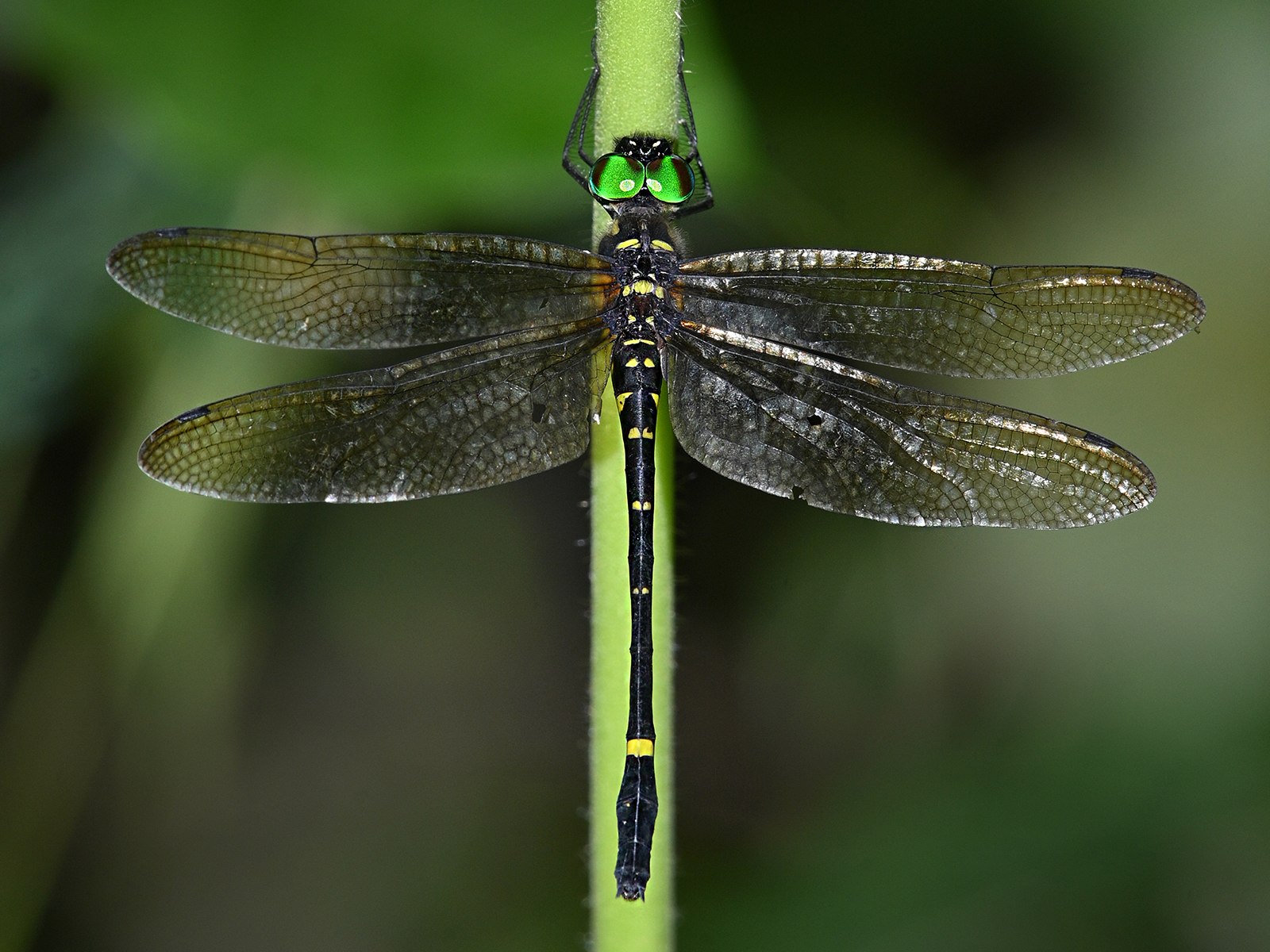

Conservation status
- Least Concern (IUCN 3.1)

Scientific classification
- Kingdom: Animalia
- Phylum: Arthropoda
- Class: Insecta
- Order: Odonata
- Infraorder: Anisoptera
- Family: Macromiidae
- Genus: Macromia
- Species: M. ida

Binomial name
- Macromia ida Fraser, 1924

= Macromia ida =

Species of dragonfly

Macromia ida is a species of dragonfly in the family Macromiidae. It is an endemic dragonfly and found only in Western Ghats in India.

== Description and habitat ==
It is a medium-sized dragonfly with emerald-green eyes. Its thorax is dark metallic blue, marked with citron-yellow. There is a well-defined humeral stripe, an oblique narrow stripe on the mesepimeron, and a narrow stripe on the posterior border of the metepimeron. Abdomen is black, marked with citron-yellow. Segment 2 has the dorsal markings greatly restricted compared to Macromia flavocolorata. Segment 3 has paired dorsal spots apposed to the basal side of jugum, and a baso-lateral triangular spot on each side. Segments 4 to 6 have the paired dorsal spots. Segment 7 has a basal annule occupying about one-third the length of segment. Segment 8 has a large triangular basal dorsal spot and a quadrate spot at the base on each side. Segments 9 and 10 are unmarked. Anal appendages are black.

Its small size and general dark colours distinguishes it from all other species except Macromia flavocolorata. It is difficult to distinguish these two species without examining the genitalia.

This species usually found hawking over shallow streams where it breeds.

== See also ==
- List of odonates of India
- List of odonata of Kerala
