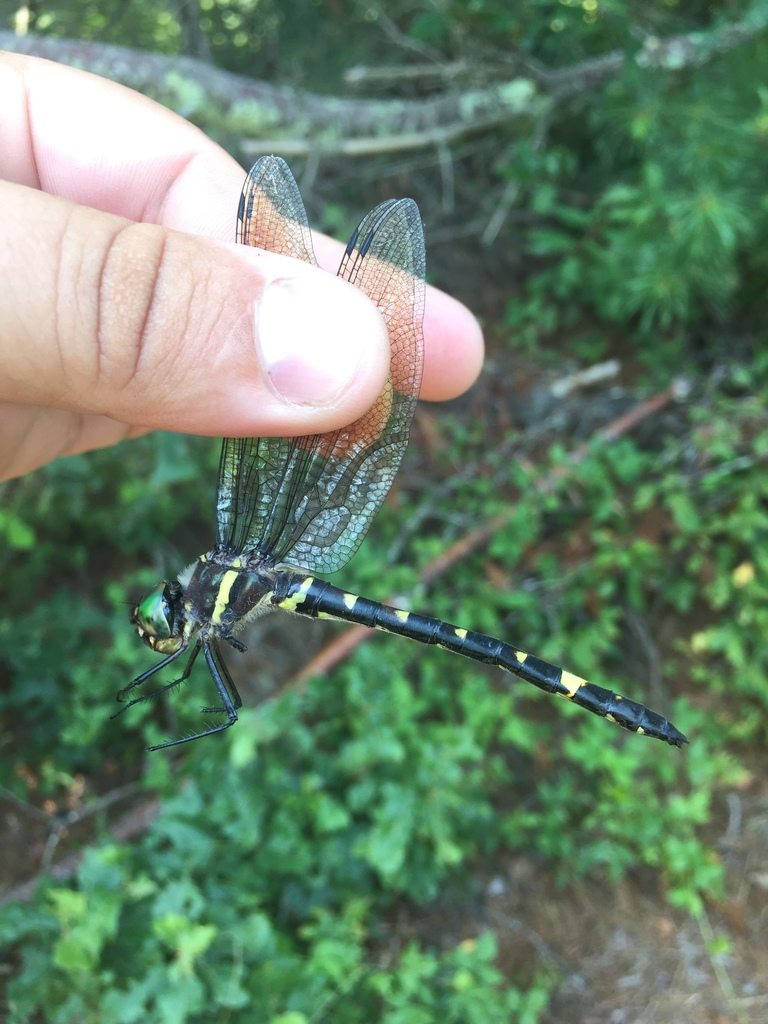

Conservation status
- Least Concern (IUCN 3.1)

Scientific classification
- Kingdom: Animalia
- Phylum: Arthropoda
- Class: Insecta
- Order: Odonata
- Infraorder: Anisoptera
- Family: Macromiidae
- Genus: Macromia
- Species: M. alleghaniensis

Binomial name
- Macromia alleghaniensis Williamson, 1909

= Macromia alleghaniensis =

Species of dragonfly

Macromia alleghaniensis, the Allegheny river cruiser, is a species of cruiser in the dragonfly family Macromiidae. It is often confused with Macromia illinoiensis, the Swift river cruiser. It can be found in the United States, particularly in the central Southeastern part of the country.

== Identification ==
The species is 2.6 to 2.8 inches (66 to 71 mm) long and has green eyes. The thorax has no frontal stripes and it has yellow spots on the abdomen. The female looks similar to the male, but the female has a cylindrical abdomen. Entomologist Edward Bruce Williamson confused the species with Macromia illinoiensis until 1909. M. alleghaniensis has often been confused with M. illinoiensis, also known as the Swift river cruiser. The species are hard to identify throughout the United States and Canada due to the species in that genus having similar wings. After observing subtle variations of yellow on both species, it was noticed that M. alleghaniensis had more geographic distribution than was previously believed. The species can be accurately identified by holding it or by studying its genitalia for a "nearly complete yellow ring on abdominal segment 2".

== Distribution ==
The species can often be found in the central Southeastern United States. Its range extends west to Southeastern Missouri, and into Western Arkansas, Oklahoma, Texas, and then finally towards the Gulf coast by the border of Mississippi and Alabama. There are rare records of the species in Georgia, Florida, and South Carolina. It is uncommon within the northern part of its range. The species is rare and of special concern in New Jersey, critically imperiled in Pennsylvania, rare and critically imperiled in Maryland, rare in Virginia, rare with needed conservation in Ohio, and critically imperiled in Illinois. It was discovered in Michigan in 2014. The species are often on slow-flowing streams that are small to medium sized.

The IUCN conservation status of Macromia alleghaniensis is "LC", least concern, with no immediate threat to the species' survival. The population is stable. The IUCN status was reviewed in 2017.
