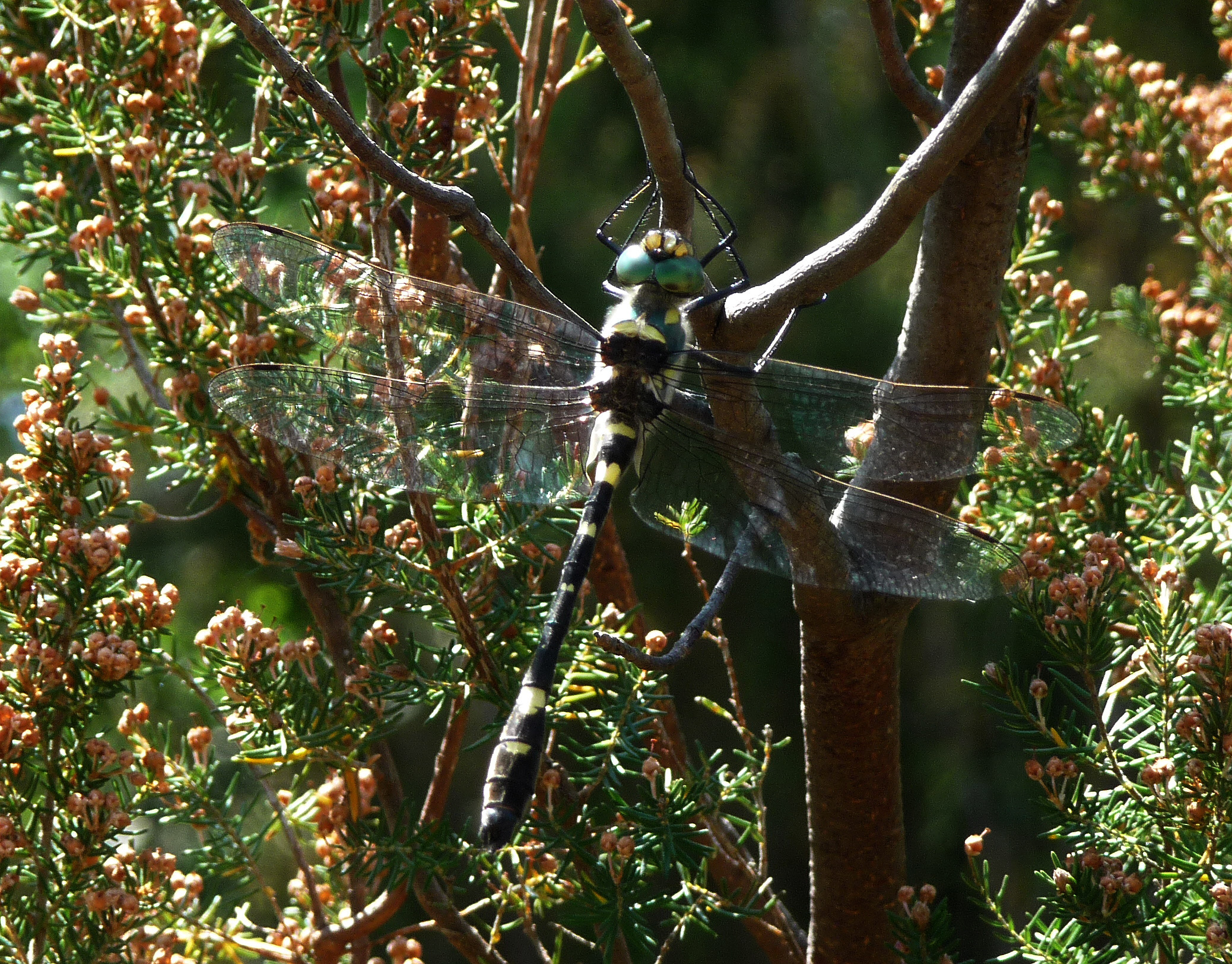

Conservation status
- Vulnerable (IUCN 3.1)

Scientific classification
- Kingdom: Animalia
- Phylum: Arthropoda
- Class: Insecta
- Order: Odonata
- Infraorder: Anisoptera
- Family: Macromiidae
- Genus: Macromia
- Species: M. splendens

Binomial name
- Macromia splendens (Pictet, 1843)

= Macromia splendens =

Species of dragonfly

Macromia splendens is a species of dragonfly in the family Macromiidae. It is found in France, Portugal, and Spain. Its natural habitats are rivers and water storage areas. It is threatened by habitat loss. Geographically, its nearest relatives within the Macromiidae are found in sub-Saharan Africa.
