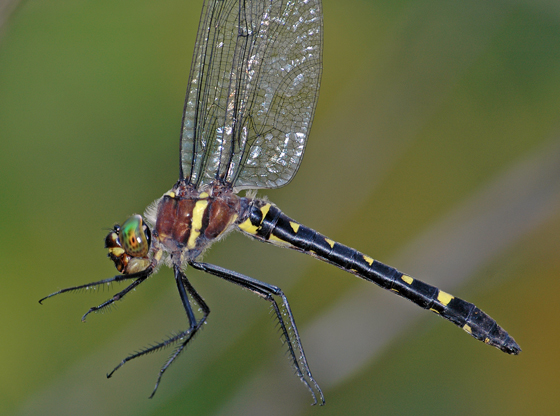

Conservation status
- Vulnerable (NatureServe)

Scientific classification
- Domain: Eukaryota
- Kingdom: Animalia
- Phylum: Arthropoda
- Class: Insecta
- Order: Odonata
- Infraorder: Anisoptera
- Family: Macromiidae
- Genus: Macromia
- Species: M. margarita

Binomial name
- Macromia margarita Westfall, 1947

= Macromia margarita =

Species of dragonfly

Macromia margarita, the mountain river cruiser, is a species of dragonfly in the family Macromiidae. It is endemic to the United States. Its natural habitat is rivers. They are Invertivores. They are typically around 7 centimeters in length and 10 in width.
