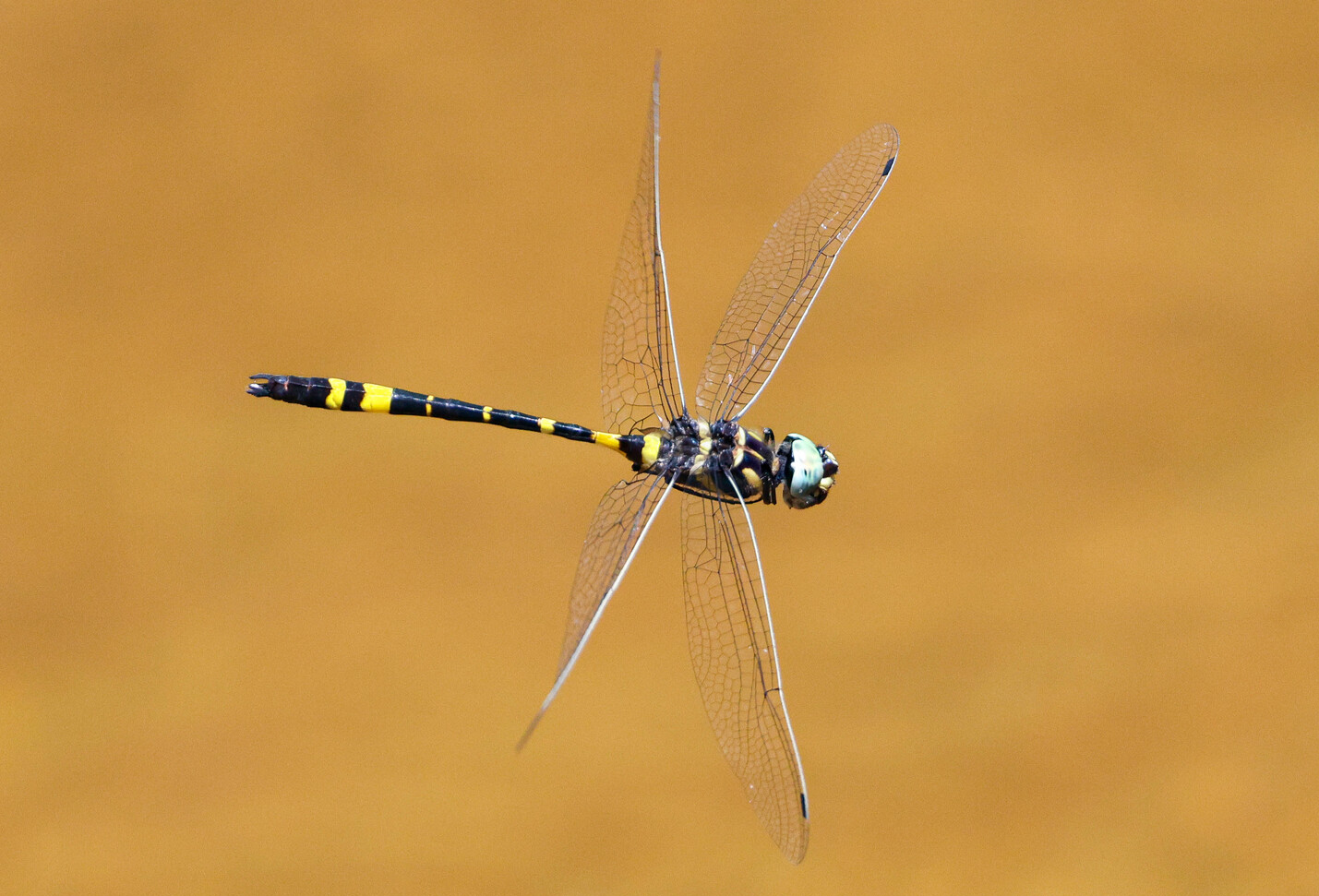
- Photographed in Desailly, Queensland

Conservation status
- Least Concern (IUCN 3.1)

Scientific classification
- Kingdom: Animalia
- Phylum: Arthropoda
- Clade: Pancrustacea
- Class: Insecta
- Order: Odonata
- Suborder: Anisoptera
- Superfamily: Libelluloidea
- Family: Macromiidae
- Genus: Macromia
- Species: M. tillyardi

Binomial name
- Macromia tillyardi Martin, 1906

= Macromia tillyardi =

Australian cruiser

Species of dragonfly

Macromia tillyardi is a species of dragonfly in the family Macromiidae, known as the Australian cruiser. It is a large, black to metallic green dragonfly with bright yellow markings on its abdomen, clear wings and long legs. It is found in northern Australia, where it inhabits streams and pools.

== Taxonomic history ==
Robin Tillyard collected the type specimen of Macromia tillyardi in 1905 and passed it onto René Martin for publication in his about-to-be-published work on Cordulines, in Collections zoologiques du baron Edm. de Selys Longchamps.

Three females of this magnificent insect were taken by me at Kuranda, N.Q., in January, 1905. As M. René Martin is about to issue his work on the Corduliinae, it seems fitting that the record and description of so fine a species should appear in his new work. I have therefore sent him my description of the insect together with the type-specimen. It will be sufficient in this paper to give a short description only, so that the insect may be recognised by Australian collectors (Tillyard, 1906)

Tillyard wrote his description and published it in November 1906, several months before Martin's work was published on 17 January 1907.

== Etymology ==
The genus name Macromia is derived from the Greek μακρός (makros, "long") and ὦμος (ōmos, "shoulder"), referring to the species' long tarsal claws.

René Martin named this species tillyardi, an eponym honouring Tillyard for collecting the original specimens of the species.

== Gallery ==
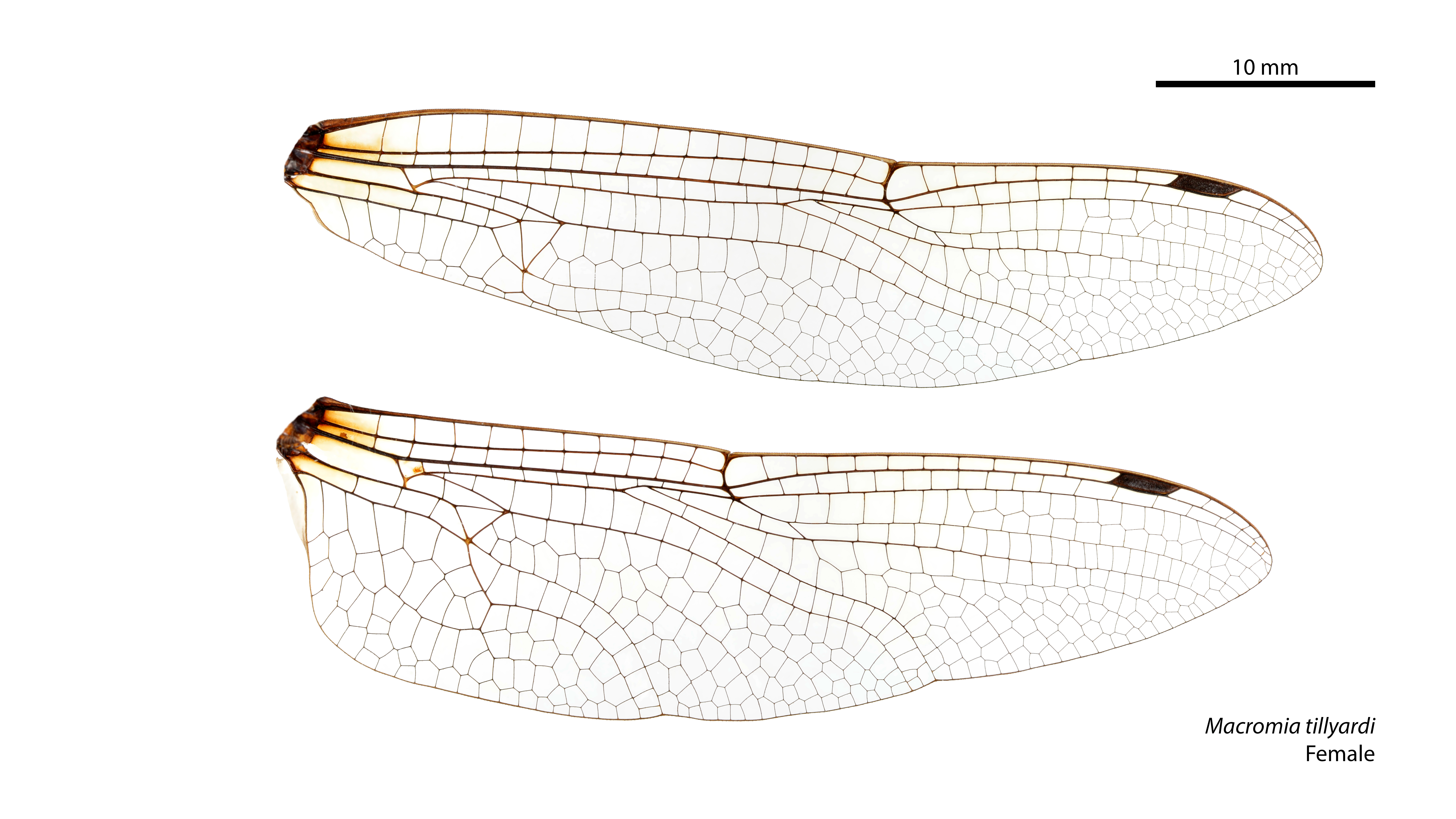
Female wings

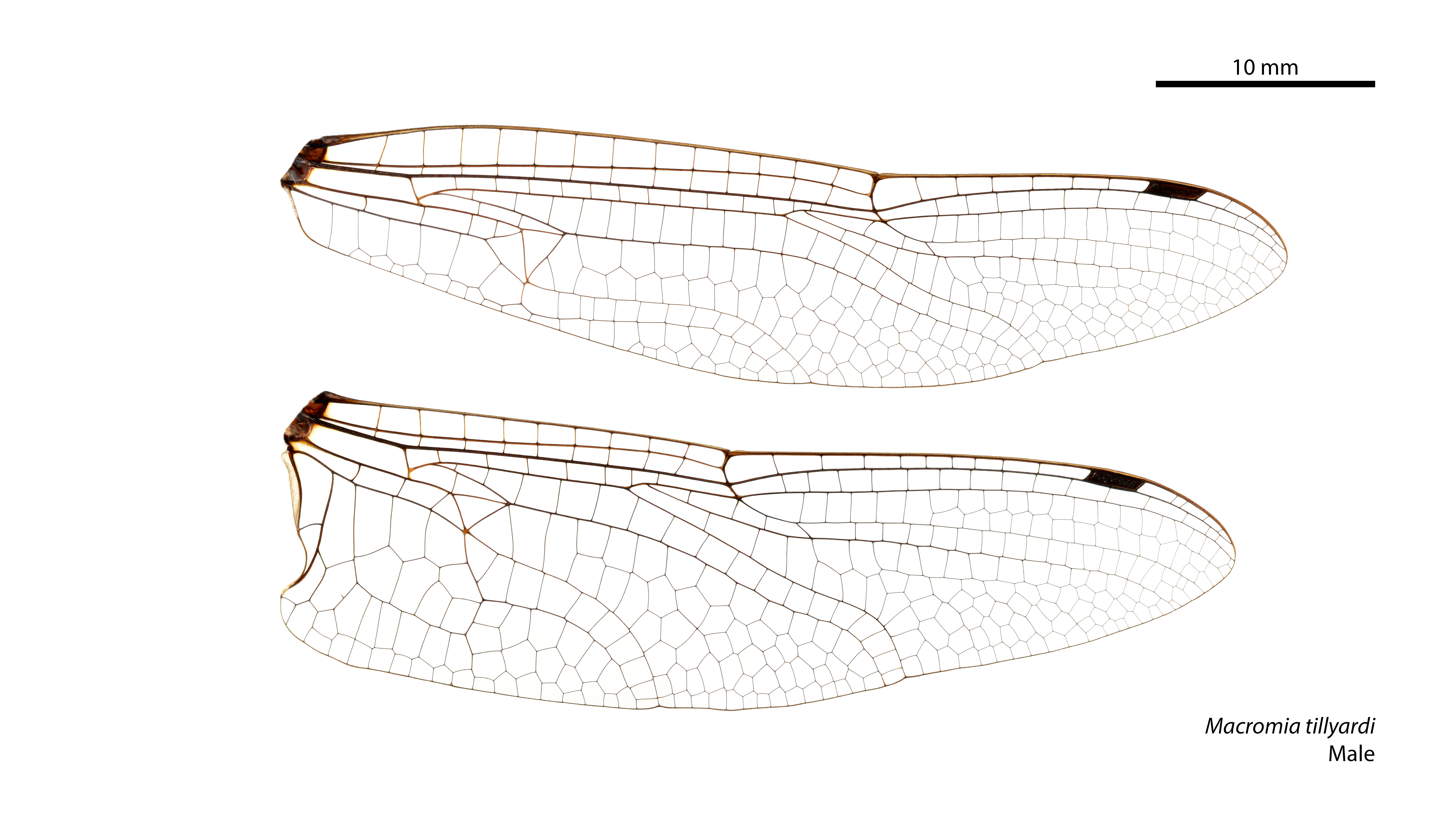
Male wings

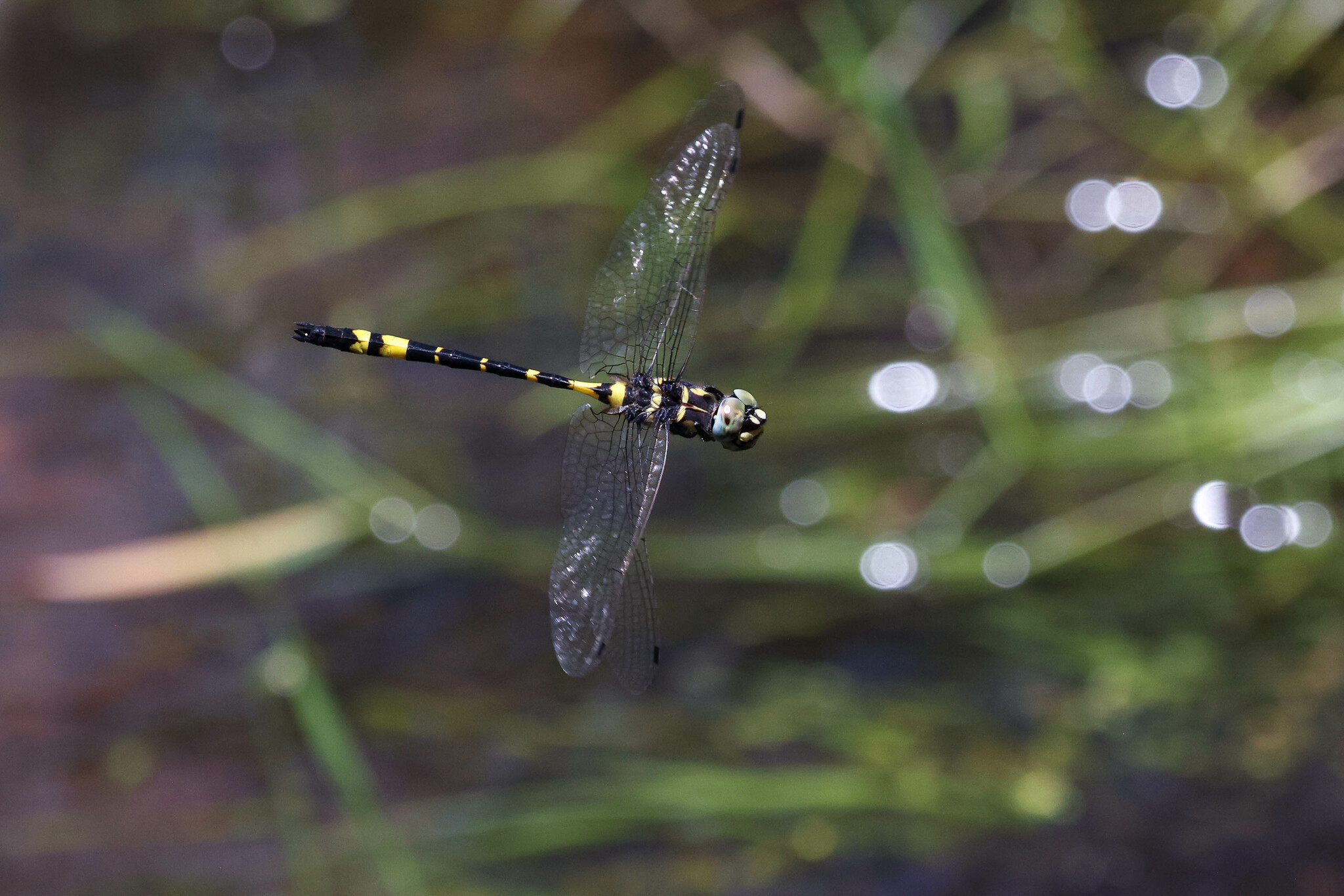
In the Herbert River south of Innot Hot Springs, Queensland

== See also ==
- List of Odonata species of Australia
