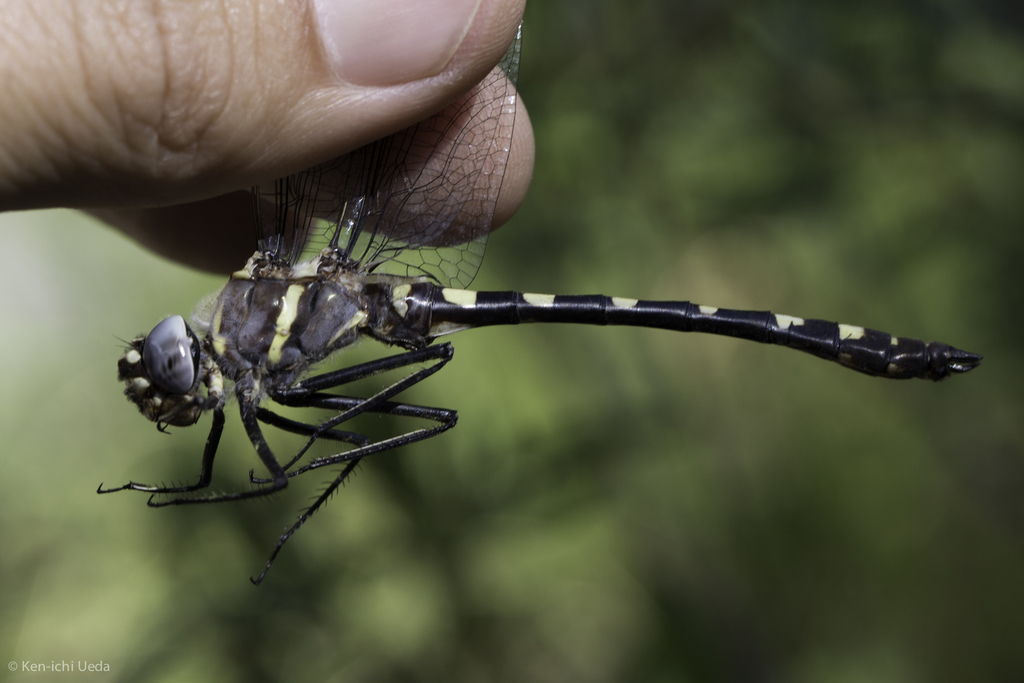

Conservation status
- Least Concern (IUCN 3.1)

Scientific classification
- Kingdom: Animalia
- Phylum: Arthropoda
- Class: Insecta
- Order: Odonata
- Infraorder: Anisoptera
- Family: Macromiidae
- Genus: Macromia
- Species: M. magnifica

Binomial name
- Macromia magnifica McLachlan in Selys, 1874

= Macromia magnifica =

Species of dragonfly

Macromia magnifica, the western river cruiser, is a species of cruiser in the dragonfly that belongs to family Macromiidae. It can be found in Central America and North America.

The IUCN conservation status of Macromia magnifica is "LC", least concern, with no immediate threat to the species survival. The population is stable hence, the IUCN status was reviewed in 2018.

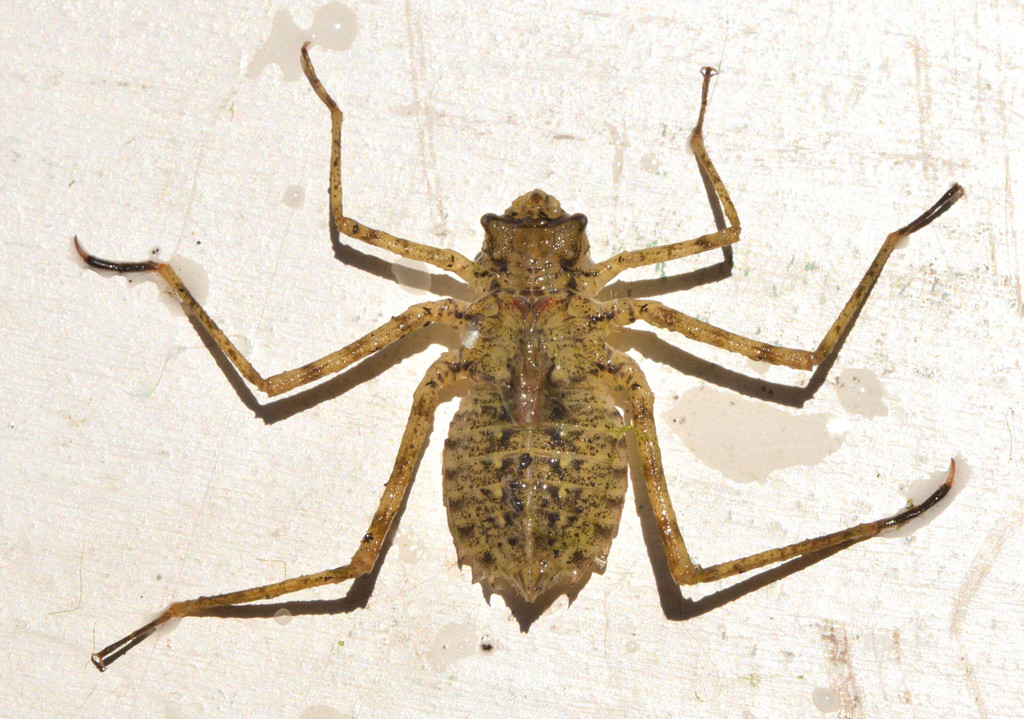
exuvia
