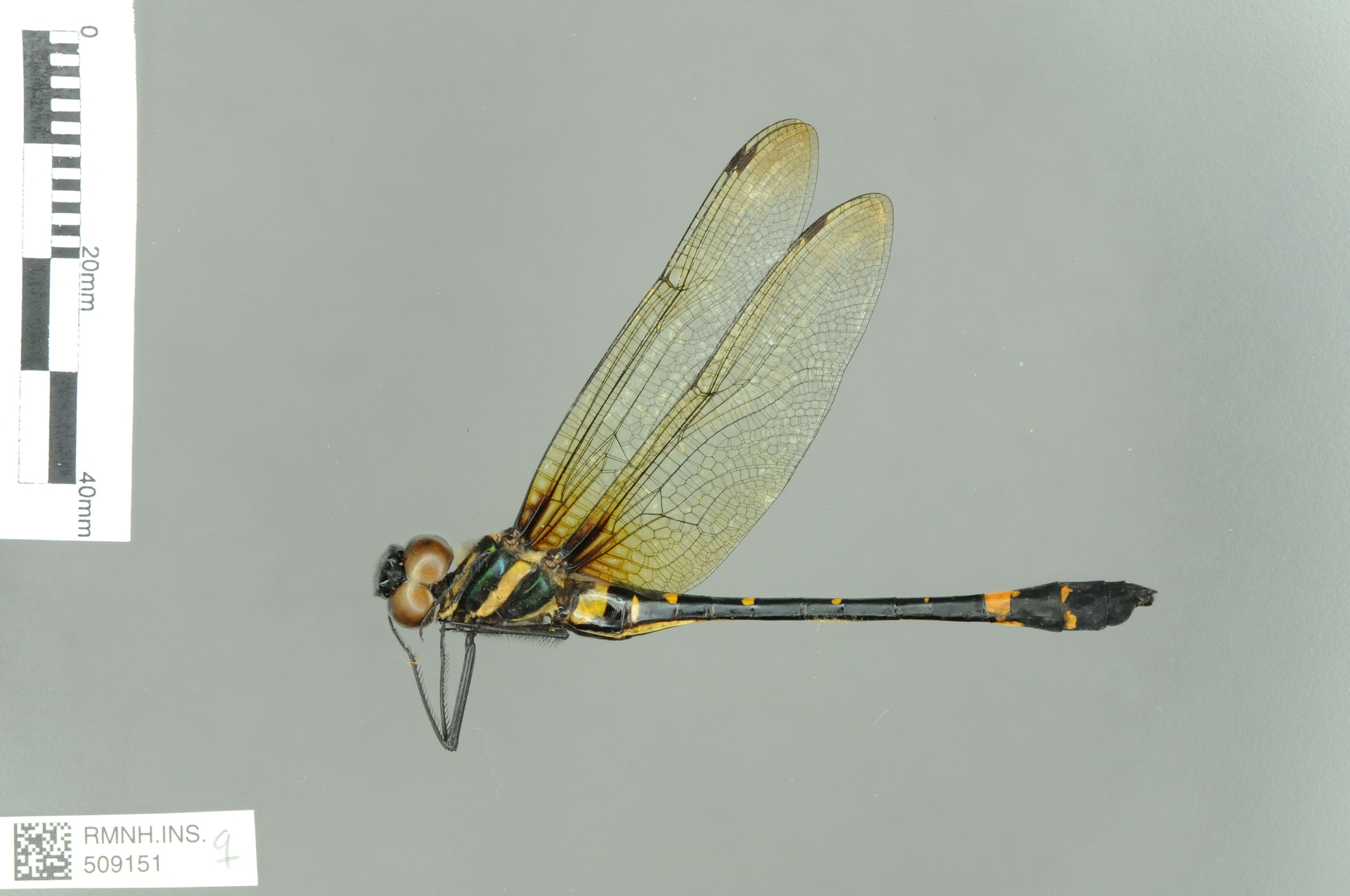

Conservation status
- Least Concern (IUCN 3.1)

Scientific classification
- Kingdom: Animalia
- Phylum: Arthropoda
- Class: Insecta
- Order: Odonata
- Infraorder: Anisoptera
- Family: Macromiidae
- Genus: Macromia
- Species: M. urania

Binomial name
- Macromia urania Ris, 1916

= Macromia urania =

Species of dragonfly

Macromia urania is a species of dragonfly in the family Macromiidae found in China, Hong Kong, Japan, Taiwan, and Vietnam. Its natural habitat is rivers, where it is threatened by habitat loss.
