= Macromia annulata =

Conservation status
- Least Concern (IUCN 3.1)

Scientific classification
- Kingdom: Animalia
- Phylum: Arthropoda
- Class: Insecta
- Order: Odonata
- Infraorder: Anisoptera
- Family: Macromiidae
- Genus: Macromia
- Species: M. annulata

Binomial name
- Macromia annulata Hagen, 1861

Species of dragonfly

Macromia annulata, the bronzed river cruiser, is a species of cruiser in the family of dragonflies known as Macromiidae. The species is native to the Mexican states of Nuevo León and San Luis Potosí and the American states of New Mexico and Texas.

The IUCN conservation status of Macromia annulata is "LC", least concern, with no immediate threat to the species' survival. The population is stable.
