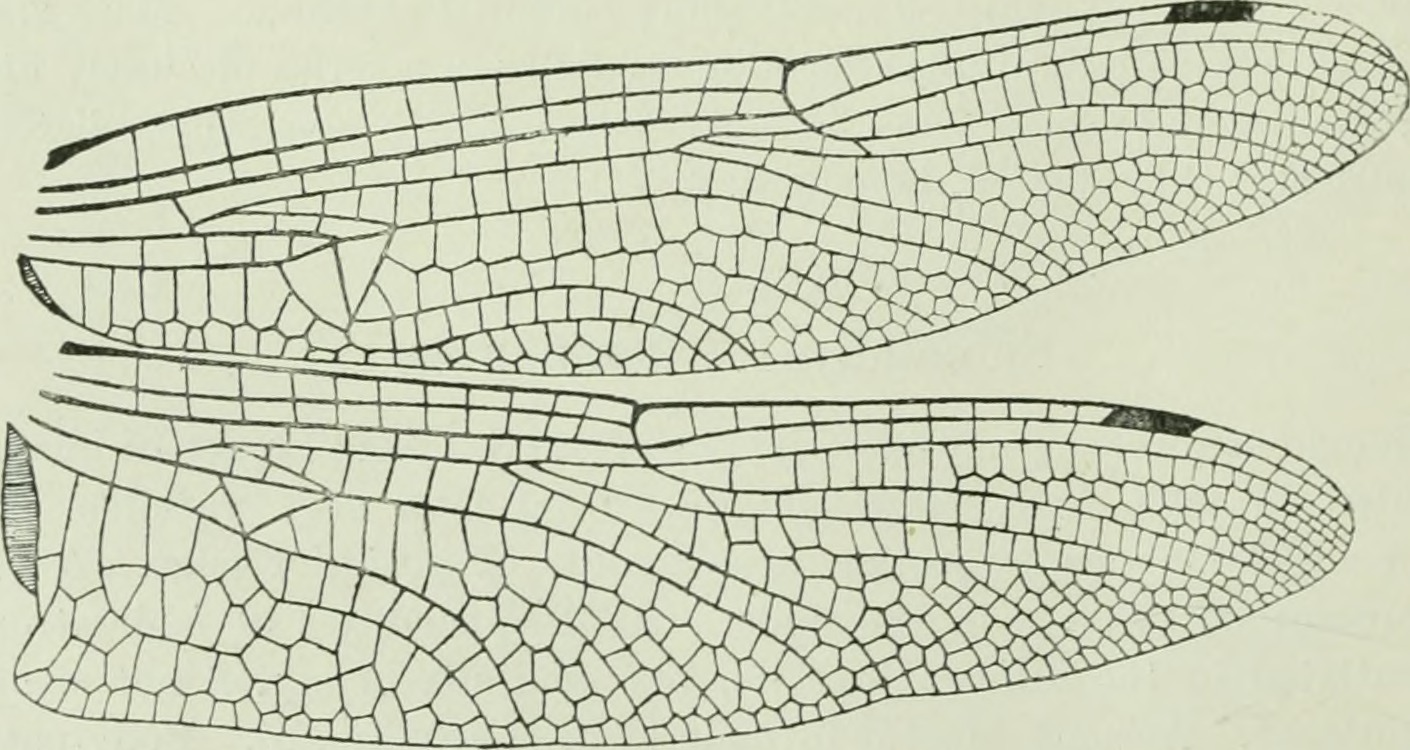

Conservation status
- Least Concern (IUCN 3.1)

Scientific classification
- Kingdom: Animalia
- Phylum: Arthropoda
- Class: Insecta
- Order: Odonata
- Infraorder: Anisoptera
- Family: Macromiidae
- Genus: Macromia
- Species: M. pacifica

Binomial name
- Macromia pacifica Hagen, 1861

= Macromia pacifica =

Species of dragonfly

Macromia pacifica, the gilded river cruiser, is a species of cruiser in the dragonfly family Macromiidae. It is found in North America.

The IUCN conservation status of Macromia pacifica is "LC", least concern, with no immediate threat to the species' survival. The IUCN status was reviewed in 2017.
