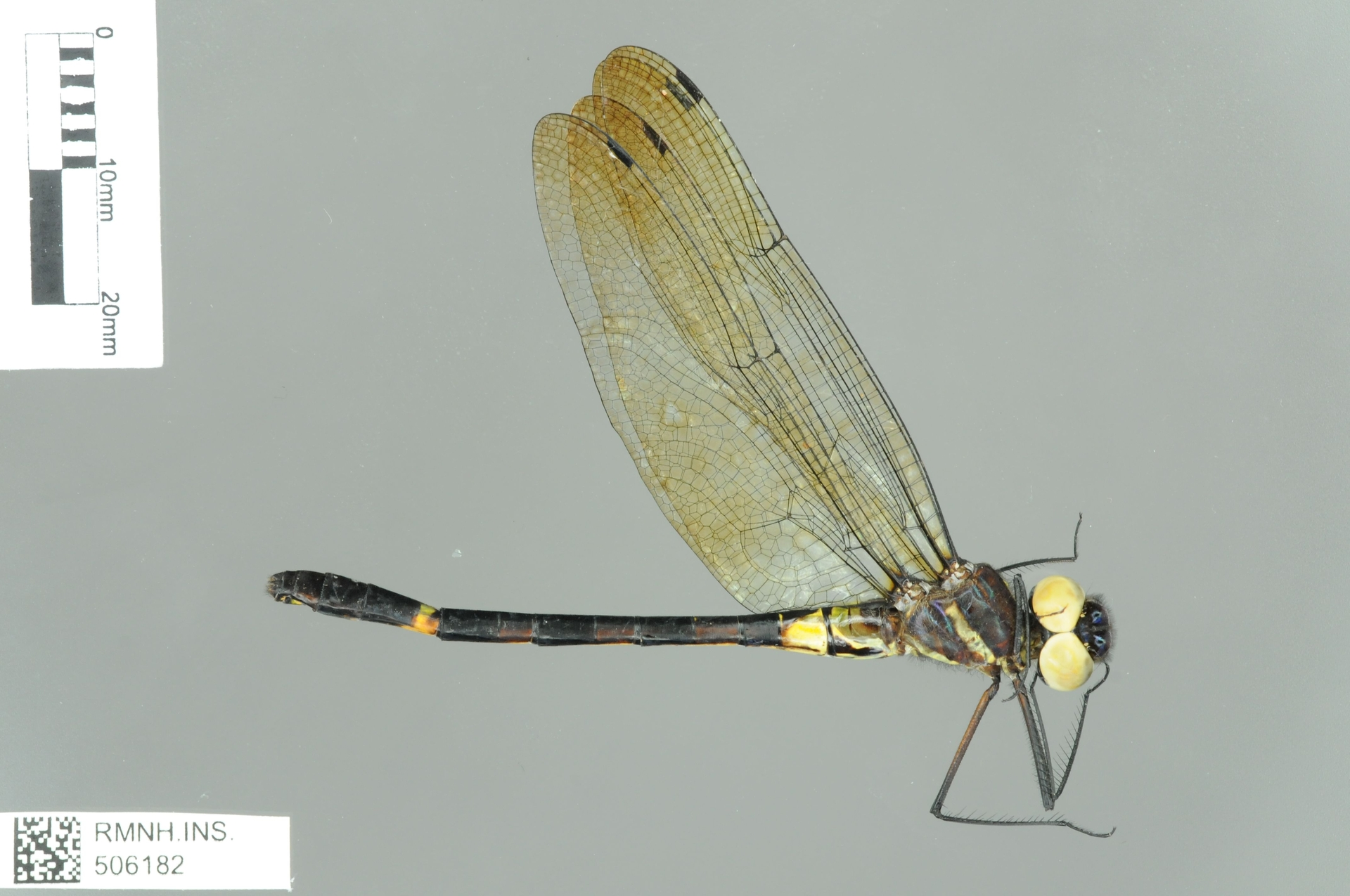

Conservation status
- Least Concern (IUCN 3.1)

Scientific classification
- Kingdom: Animalia
- Phylum: Arthropoda
- Class: Insecta
- Order: Odonata
- Infraorder: Anisoptera
- Family: Macromiidae
- Genus: Phyllomacromia
- Species: P. melania

Binomial name
- Phyllomacromia melania (Selys, 1871)

Synonyms
- Phyllomacromia funicularia (Martin, 1906)

= Phyllomacromia melania =

Species of dragonfly

Phyllomacromia melania is a species of dragonfly in the family Macromiidae. It is found in Angola, Cameroon, the Republic of the Congo, the Democratic Republic of the Congo, Equatorial Guinea, Gabon, Ghana, Guinea, Kenya, Liberia, Malawi, Nigeria, Sierra Leone, Tanzania, Uganda, possibly Botswana, possibly Burundi, possibly Ivory Coast, possibly Gambia, possibly Mali, possibly Mozambique, possibly Namibia, possibly Senegal, possibly South Africa, possibly Sudan, possibly Togo, possibly Zambia, and possibly Zimbabwe. Its natural habitats are subtropical or tropical moist lowland forests, rivers, intermittent freshwater lakes, and intermittent freshwater marshes.
