= Macromia zeylanica =

Sri Lanka cruiser

Scientific classification
- Kingdom: Animalia
- Phylum: Arthropoda
- Clade: Pancrustacea
- Class: Insecta
- Order: Odonata
- Suborder: Anisoptera
- Superfamily: Libelluloidea
- Family: Macromiidae
- Genus: Macromia
- Species: M. zeylanica

Binomial name
- Macromia zeylanica Fraser, 1927

Species of insect

Macromia zeylanica (Sri Lanka cruiser) is a species of dragonfly in the family Macromiidae. It is endemic to Sri Lanka.

== See also ==
- List of odonates of Sri Lanka
