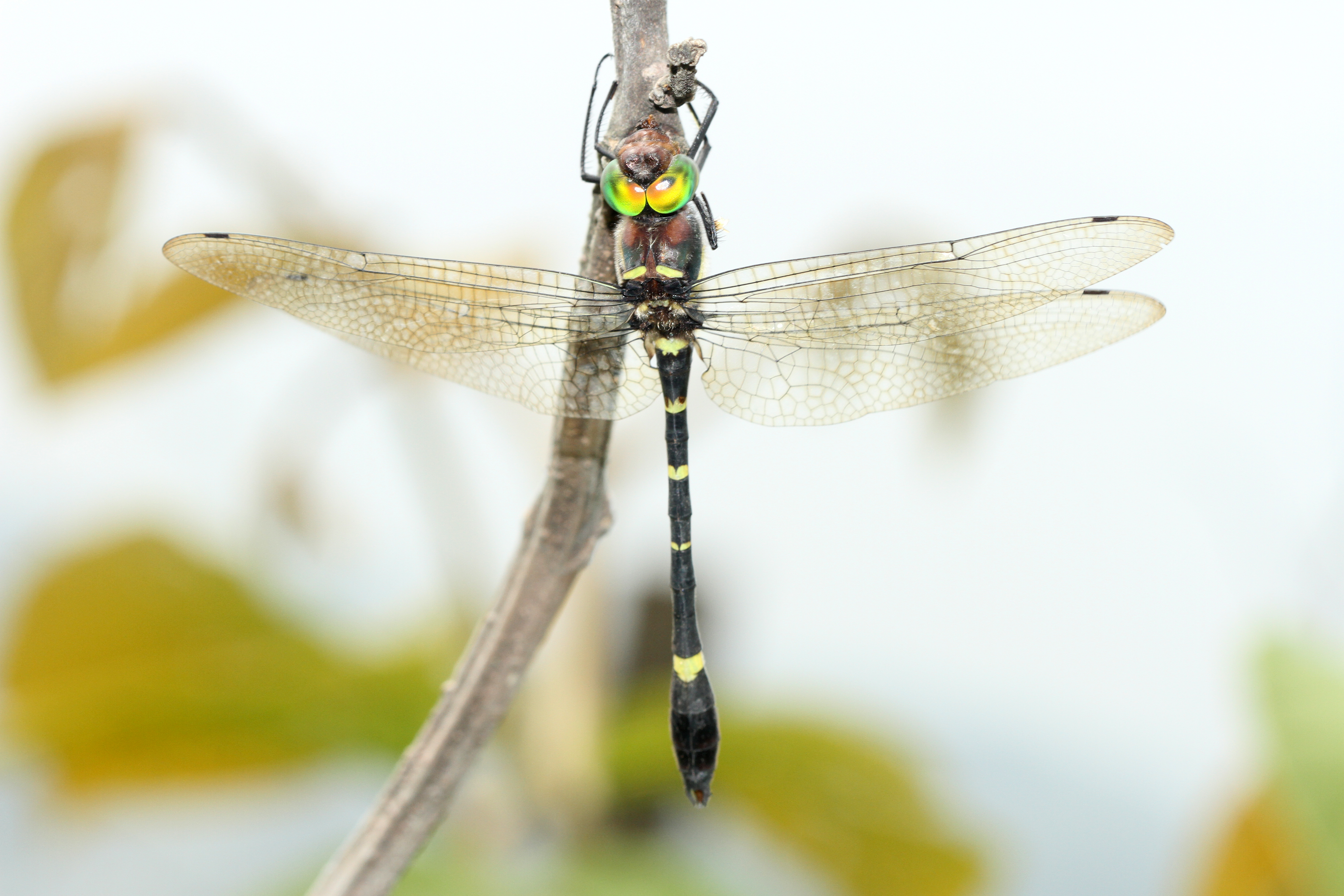

Conservation status
- Least Concern (IUCN 3.1)

Scientific classification
- Kingdom: Animalia
- Phylum: Arthropoda
- Class: Insecta
- Order: Odonata
- Infraorder: Anisoptera
- Family: Macromiidae
- Genus: Macromia
- Species: M. moorei

Binomial name
- Macromia moorei Selys, 1874

Synonyms
- Macromia trituberculata Fraser, 1921

= Macromia moorei =

Species of dragonfly

Macromia moorei is a species of dragonfly in the family Macromiidae. The species is found in South Asia and Southeast Asia.

The species has three subspecies:

- Macromia moorei fumata Krüger, 1899
- Macromia moorei malayana Laidlaw, 1928
- Macromia moorei moorei
