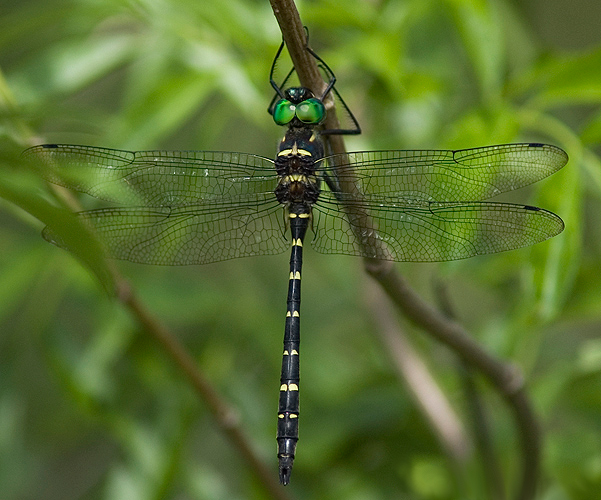

Scientific classification
- Kingdom: Animalia
- Phylum: Arthropoda
- Class: Insecta
- Order: Odonata
- Infraorder: Anisoptera
- Family: Macromiidae
- Genus: Macromia
- Species: M. taeniolata

Binomial name
- Macromia taeniolata Rambur, 1842

= Macromia taeniolata =

Royal river cruiser

Species of dragonfly

Macromia taeniolata, the royal river cruiser is a species of dragonfly in the family Macromiidae. It is a long, slender insect with bright green eyes and a dark brown body with yellow stripes. The sexes are alike. It is found along large streams and rivers.
