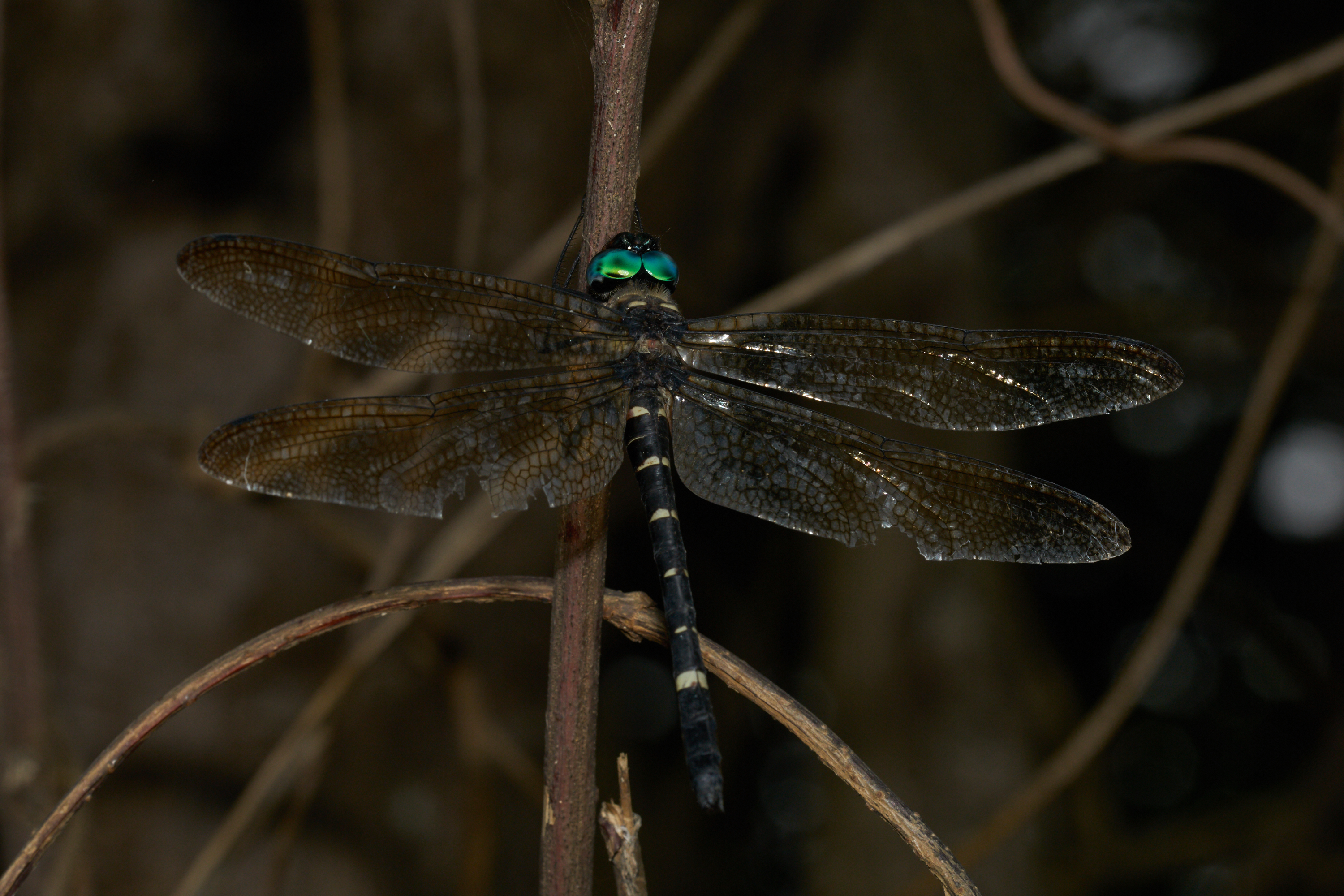
- male

Conservation status
- Least Concern (IUCN 3.1)

Scientific classification
- Kingdom: Animalia
- Phylum: Arthropoda
- Clade: Pancrustacea
- Class: Insecta
- Order: Odonata
- Infraorder: Anisoptera
- Superfamily: Libelluloidea
- Family: Macromiidae
- Genus: Macromia
- Species: M. ellisoni

Binomial name
- Macromia ellisoni Fraser, 1924

= Macromia ellisoni =

Coorg torrent hawk

Species of dragonfly

The Coorg torrent hawk, Macromia ellisoni, is a species of dragonfly in the family Macromiidae. It is a rare and endemic dragonfly and found only in Western Ghats in South India.

== Description and habitat ==
It is a medium sized dragonfly with emarald-green eyes. Its thorax is black, lower part of dorsum changing to dark reddish-brown, marked with a narrow citron-yellow stripe. Laterally there is a narrow oblique yellow stripe over the mesepimeron. Abdomen is black, marked with citron yellow. Segment 2 has a very narrow, rather broadly interrupted annule. The interruption is at the mid-dorsum instead of sub-dorsum on both sides as in Macromia annaimallaiensis. Segments 3 to 5 have small paired dorsal spots, being mere points on segment 6. Segment 7 has a complete basal annule occupying one-third the length of segment. Segments 8 and 9 have paired ventral spots. Segment 10 is unmarked. Anal appendages are black.

This species is the largest Macromia known from India. They usually found flying over torrent streams and waterfalls flowing through evergreen forests.

== See also ==
- List of odonates of India
- List of odonata of Kerala
