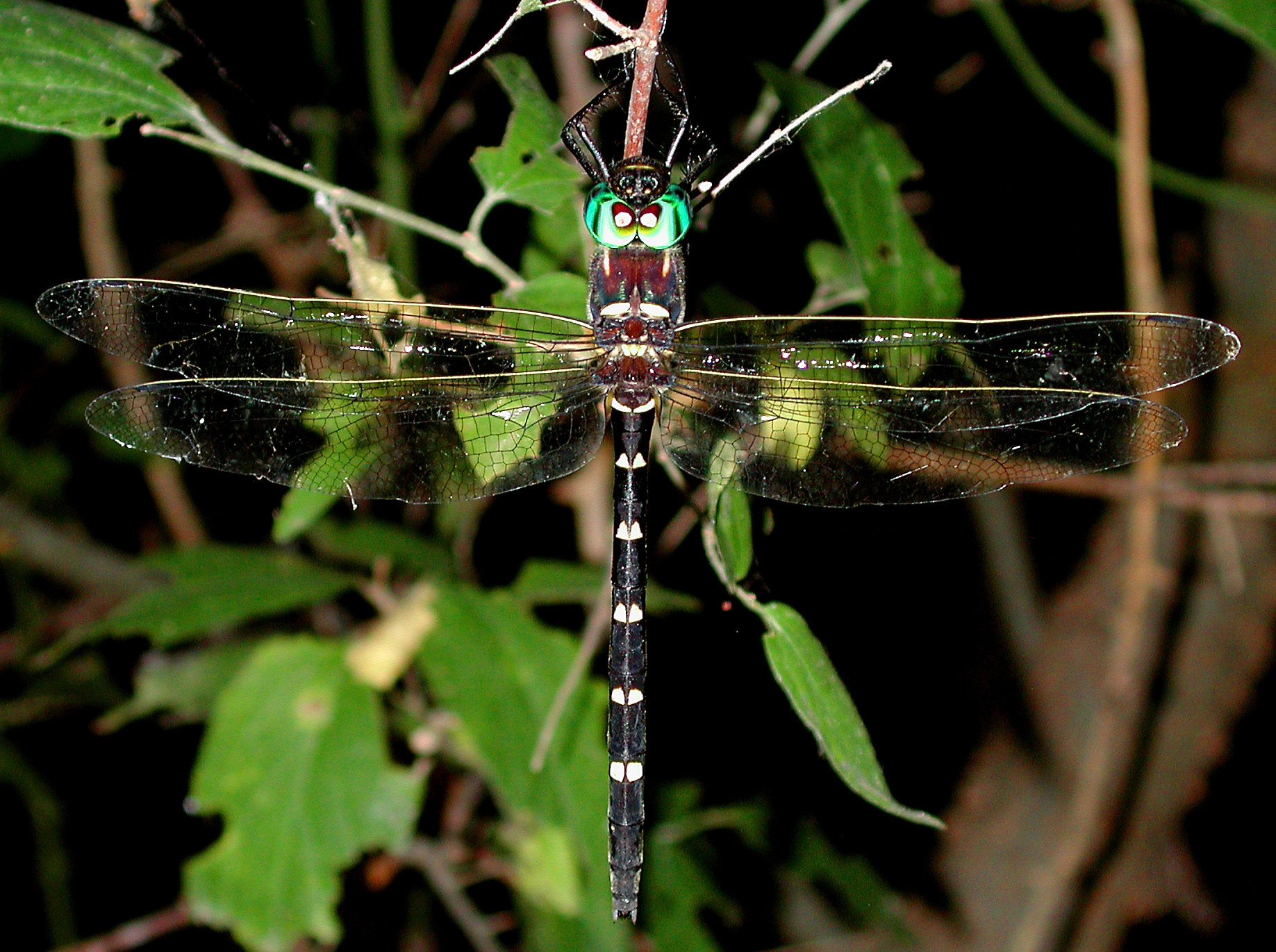
- Macromia illinoiensis

Scientific classification
- Kingdom: Animalia
- Phylum: Arthropoda
- Clade: Pancrustacea
- Class: Insecta
- Order: Odonata
- Infraorder: Anisoptera
- Superfamily: Libelluloidea
- Family: Macromiidae
- Genus: Macromia; Rambur, 1842

= Macromia =

River cruisers

Genus of dragonflies

Macromia is a genus of large dragonflies in the family Macromiidae. Species of the genus Macromia are commonly known as river cruisers from their habit of cruising long distances along river banks. Most species occur in the tropical Australasian region, with one species being found in Europe (Macromia splendens), and a few species occurring in North America.

== Etymology ==
The genus name Macromia is derived from the Greek μακρός (makros, "long") and ὦμος (ōmos, "shoulder"), referring to the species' long tarsal claws.

== Species ==
The genus Macromia includes the following species:

Male	Female	Scientific name	Common name	Distribution
		Macromia aculeata Fraser, 1927		Myanmar
		Macromia alleghaniensis Williamson, 1909	Allegheny river cruiser	United States
		Macromia amphigena Selys, 1871		Korea, China
		Macromia annaimallaiensis Fraser, 1931		Western Ghats in South India
		Macromia annulata Hagen, 1861	bronzed river cruiser	Texas and New Mexico
		Macromia arachnomima Lieftinck, 1953		Peninsular Malaysia, south Borneo and Thailand
		Macromia astarte Lieftinck, 1971		Borneo
		Macromia bartenevi Belyshev, 1973		Russian, North Korea Japan
		Macromia beijingensis Zhu & Chen, 2005		China (Beijing, Henan)
		Macromia bellicosa Fraser, 1924		Western Ghats in South India.
		Macromia berlandi Lieftinck, 1941	Angled-winged Cruiser	China
		Macromia calliope Ris, 1916		Malaysia
		Macromia callisto Laidlaw, 1902		Vietnam
		Macromia celaeno Lieftinck, 1955		New Guinea
		Macromia celebia van Tol, 1994		Borneo
		Macromia chaiyaphumensis Hämäläinen, 1985		Thailand
		Macromia chalciope Lieftinck, 1952		Indonesia
		Macromia chui Asahina, 1968		Taiwan
		Macromia cincta Rambur, 1842		Malaysia, Vietnam, Borneo
		Macromia cingulata Rambur, 1842		Western Ghats in India.
		Macromia clio Ris, 1916		Taiwan
		Macromia corycia Laidlaw, 1922		Borneo
		Macromia cupricincta Fraser, 1924		Thailand
		Macromia cydippe Laidlaw, 1922		Singapore
		Macromia daimoji Okumura, 1949		South Korea
		Macromia dione Lieftinck, 1971		Mexico
		Macromia ellisoni Fraser, 1924	Coorg torrent hawk	India
		Macromia erato Lieftinck, 1950		Java
		Macromia euphrosyne Lieftinck, 1952		Indonesia
		Macromia eurynome Lieftinck, 1942		New Guinea
		Macromia euterpe Laidlaw, 1915		Borneo
		Macromia flavicincta Selys, 1874		India
		Macromia flavocolorata Fraser, 1922		India, Nepal, Thailand, Laos, Vietnam and China.
		Macromia flavovittata Fraser, 1935		India
		Macromia flinti Lieftinck, 1977		Sri Lanka
		Macromia floridensis Davis, 1921	Florida cruiser	North America
		Macromia fulgidifrons Wilson, 1998		China (Guangxi)
		Macromia gerstaeckeri Krüger, 1899		Borneo
		Macromia hamata Zhou, 2003		China (Guizhou)
		Macromia hermione Lieftinck, 1952		Misool Island
		Macromia holthuisi Kalkman, 2008		Papua
		Macromia icterica Lieftinck, 1926		China
		Macromia ida Fraser, 1924		India.
		Macromia illinoiensis Walsh, 1862	swift river cruiser or Illinois River Cruiser	United States
		Macromia indica Fraser, 1924		India
		Macromia irata Fraser, 1924		India
		Macromia irina Lieftinck, 1950		Celebes
		Macromia jucunda Lieftinck, 1955		Java
		Macromia katae Wilson, 1993		Vietnam
		Macromia kiautai Zhou, Wang, Shuai & Liu, 1994		China
		Macromia kubokaiya Asahina, 1964		Japan
		Macromia lachesis Lieftinck, 1971		Bismark
		Macromia macula Zhou, Wang, Shuai & Liu, 1994		China
		Macromia magnifica McLachlan in Selys, 1874	western river cruiser	Central America and North America
		Macromia malleifera Lieftinck, 1955		China (Fujian, Guangdong and Zhejiang)
		Macromia manchurica Asahina, 1964		China
		Macromia margarita Westfall, 1947	mountain river cruiser	United States
		Macromia melpomene Ris, 1913		New Guinea
		Macromia mnemosyne Lieftinck, 1935		Borneo
		Macromia moorei Selys, 1874		Vietnam
		Macromia negrito Needham & Gyger, 1937		Philippines
		Macromia pacifica Hagen, 1861	gilded river cruiser	North America
		Macromia pallida Fraser, 1924		India
		Macromia pinratani Asahina, 1983		Thailand
		Macromia polyhymnia Lieftinck, 1929		Sumatra
		Macromia pyramidalis Martin, 1906		Vietnam
		Macromia septima Martin, 1904		China
		Macromia siamensis Makbun, 2022		Thailand
		Macromia sombui Vick, 1988		Nepal
		Macromia sophrosyne Lieftinck, 1952		Misool Island
		Macromia splendens Pictet, 1843	splendid cruiser, shining macromia dragonfly	France, Spain, Portugal
		Macromia taeniolata Rambur, 1842	royal river cruiser	United States
		Macromia terpsichore Förster, 1900		New Guinea
		Macromia tillyardi Martin, 1906	Australian cruiser	Australia
		Macromia transversa (Say, 1840)	stream cruiser	North America
		Macromia unca Wilson, 2004		Vietnam
		Macromia urania Ris, 1916		China, Vietnam
		Macromia viridescens Tillyard, 1911	rainforest cruiser	Australia, New Guinea
		Macromia weerakooni Sumanapala, 2021		Sri Lanka
		Macromia westwoodii Selys, 1874		Asia
		Macromia whitei Selys, 1871		India
		Macromia yunnanensis Zhou, Luo, Hu & Wu, 1993		China
		Macromia zeylanica Fraser, 1927		Sri Lanka
