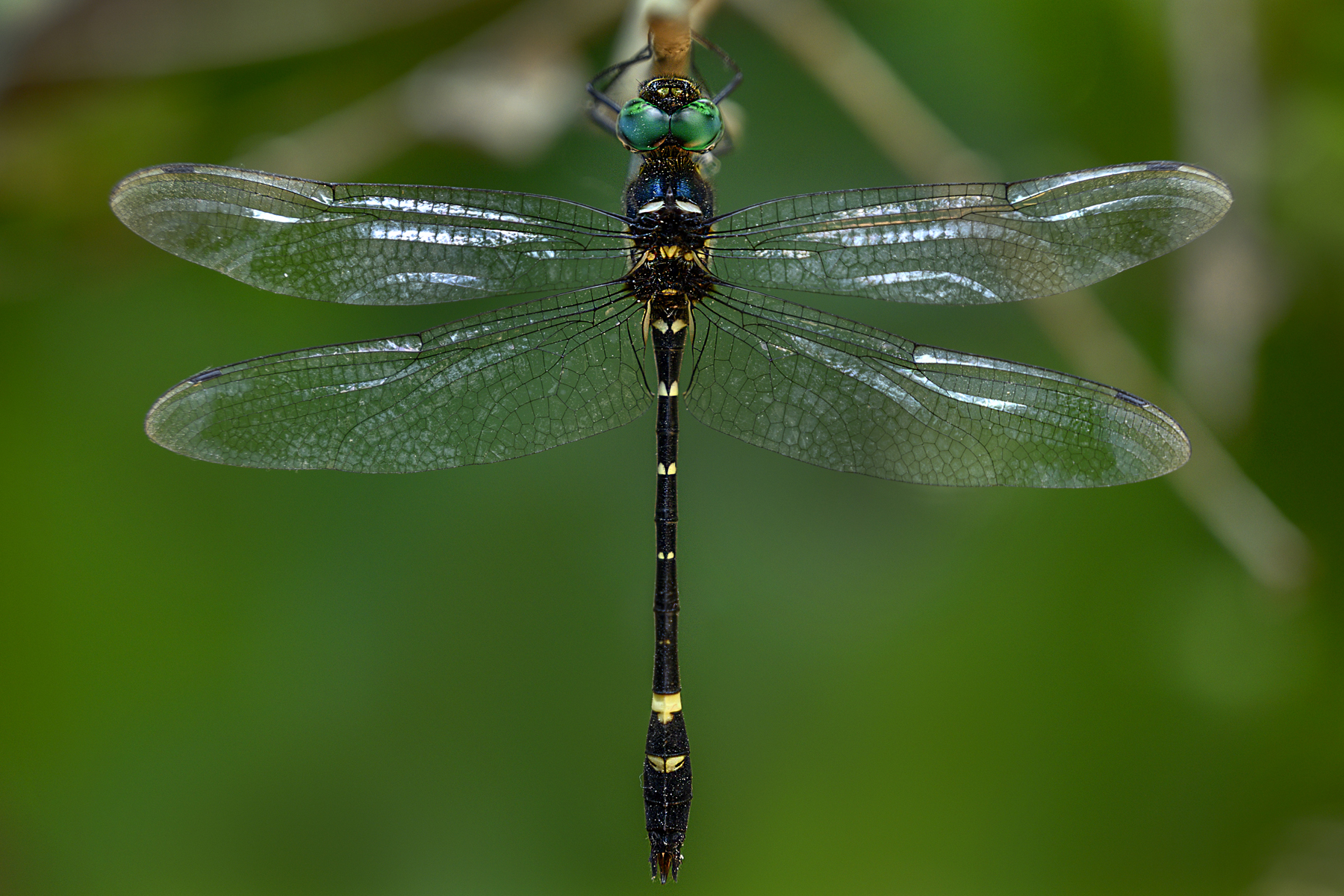
- Male

Conservation status
- Least Concern (IUCN 3.1)

Scientific classification
- Kingdom: Animalia
- Phylum: Arthropoda
- Class: Insecta
- Order: Odonata
- Infraorder: Anisoptera
- Family: Macromiidae
- Genus: Macromia
- Species: M. irata

Binomial name
- Macromia irata Fraser, 1924

= Macromia irata =

Species of dragonfly

Macromia irata is a species of dragonfly in the family Macromiidae. It is endemic to Western Ghats in India.

== Description and habitat ==
It is a medium sized dragonfly with emerald-green eyes. Its thorax is dark green metallic on dorsum, dark reddish-brown at sides, marked with citron-yellow. There is humeral stripe, an oblique narrow stripe on mesepimeron, and another stripe on the posterior border of metepimeron. Abdomen is black, marked with citron-yellow. Segment 2 has a pair of mid-dorsal diamond-shaped spots narrowly separated in the middle. The ventral border of this segment is broadly yellow at base. Segment 3 has a pair of mid-dorsal triangular spots at the basal side of jugal suture and a large triangular spot on each side at base. Segments 4 to 6 have the paired mid-dorsal spots. Segment 7 has the basal third to half yellow. Segment 8 has a narrow basal annule. Segments 9 and 10 are unmarked. Anal appendages are black.

It is usually found soaring over forest roads near streams.

It can be distinguished from other Macromia species by a characteristic twin diamond-shaped saddle-marking on segment 2.

== See also ==
- List of odonates of India
- List of odonata of Kerala
