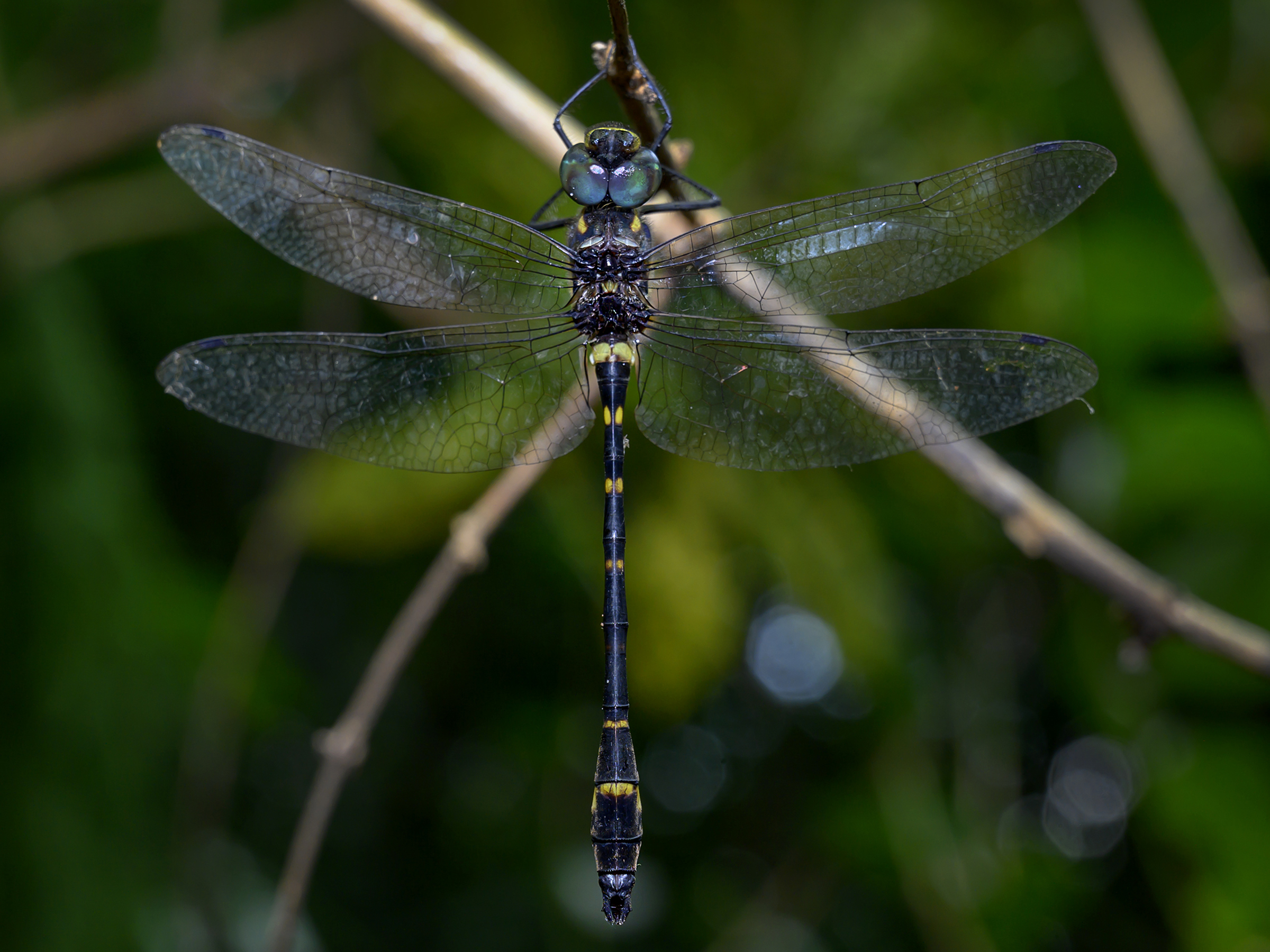
- Male

Conservation status
- Least Concern (IUCN 3.1)

Scientific classification
- Kingdom: Animalia
- Phylum: Arthropoda
- Class: Insecta
- Order: Odonata
- Infraorder: Anisoptera
- Family: Macromiidae
- Genus: Macromia
- Species: M. cingulata

Binomial name
- Macromia cingulata Rambur, 1842

= Macromia cingulata =

Species of dragonfly

Macromia cingulata is a species of dragonfly in the family Macromiidae. It is an endemic dragonfly and found only in Western Ghats in India. It breeds in rivers.

== Description ==
It is a medium-sized dragonfly with blue eyes. Its thorax is metallic bluish-violet, marked with bright citron-yellow. There is a mid-dorsal carina, a narrow humeral stripe, an oblique stripe on each side traversing the mesepimeron, and a narrow stripe bordering the metepimeron. Abdomen is black, ringed with pale citron-yellow. Segment 2 has its basal half and the apical end of ventral border are yellow. Segment 3 has a pair of sub-basal dorsal spots, and laterally a triangular spot at base. Segments 4 to 7 have complete annules situated at the same place as the spots on segment 3. The ring on segment 7 almost extending to base of segment and with a fan-shaped extension overlapping the jugal suture. Segment 8 has the ring covering the basal half of segment. Segment 9 has an angulated spot on each side at the base. Segment 10 is unmarked. Anal appendages are black.

Its delicate build, black color with yellow markings, lips broadly bordered with black, and face bright yellow barred with black will easily distinguish it from other Macromia species.

== Habitat ==
It is usually found hawking over shallow water streams flowing over submontane areas.

== See also ==
- List of odonates of India
- List of odonata of Kerala
