= Macromia viridescens =

Rainforest cruiser

Conservation status
- Least Concern (IUCN 3.1)

Scientific classification
- Kingdom: Animalia
- Phylum: Arthropoda
- Clade: Pancrustacea
- Class: Insecta
- Order: Odonata
- Infraorder: Anisoptera
- Family: Macromiidae
- Genus: Macromia
- Species: M. viridescens

Binomial name
- Macromia viridescens Tillyard, 1911

Synonyms
- Macromia amymone Lieftinck, 1952

Species of dragonfly

Macromia viridescens is a species of dragonfly in the family Macromiidae, known as the rainforest cruiser. It is a large, black to metallic green dragonfly with yellow markings on its thorax, dark metallic green on its abdomen, clear wings and long legs. It is found on Cape York in northern Queensland, Australia, and New Guinea, where it inhabits streams.

== Etymology ==
The genus name Macromia is derived from the Greek μακρός (makros, "long") and ὦμος (ōmos, "shoulder"), referring to the species' long tarsal claws.

The species name viridescens is derived from the Latin viridis ("green") and -escens ("becoming" or "becoming like"), referring to the brilliant metallic green on the thorax and part of the abdomen.

== Gallery ==
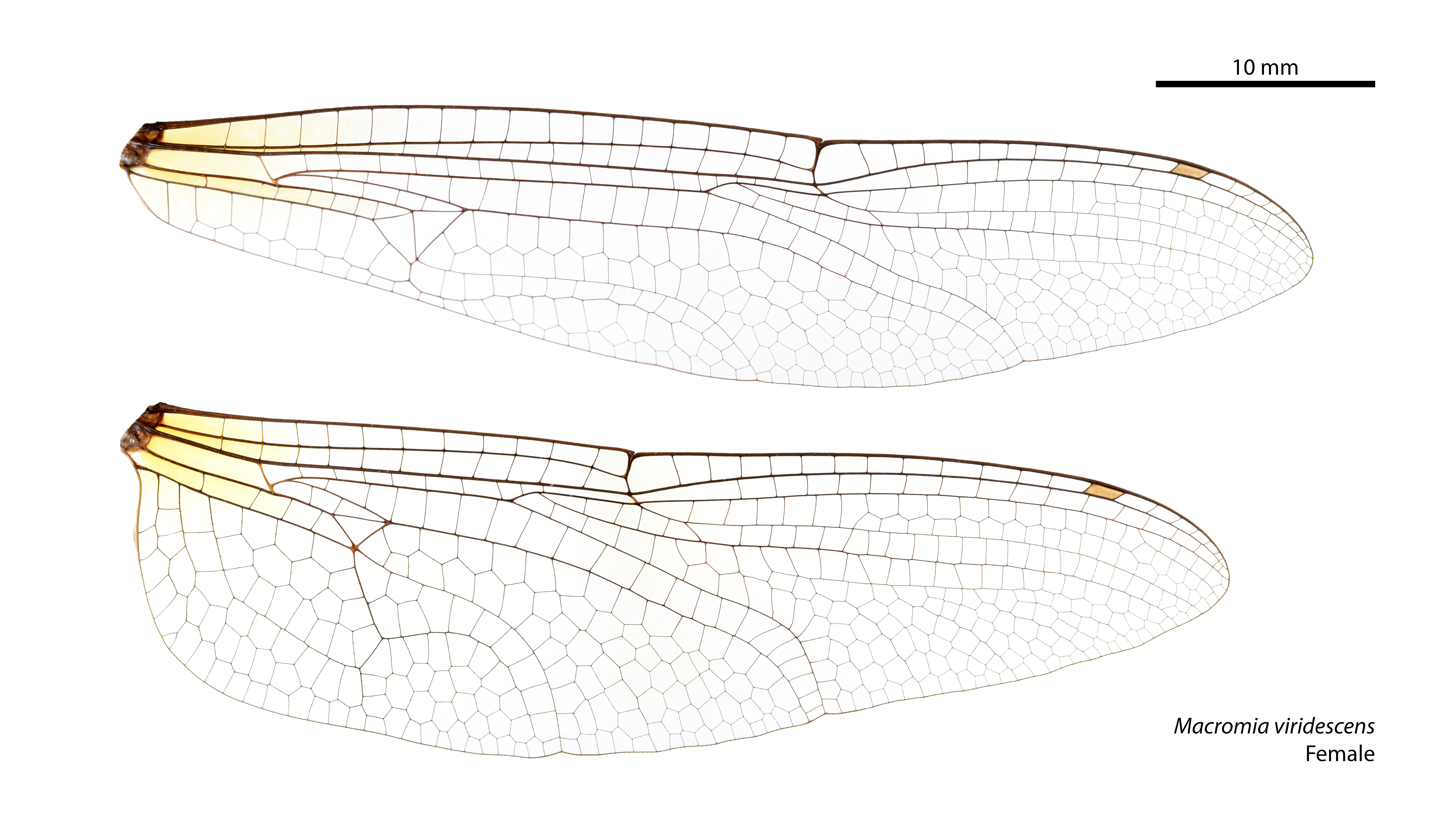
Female wings

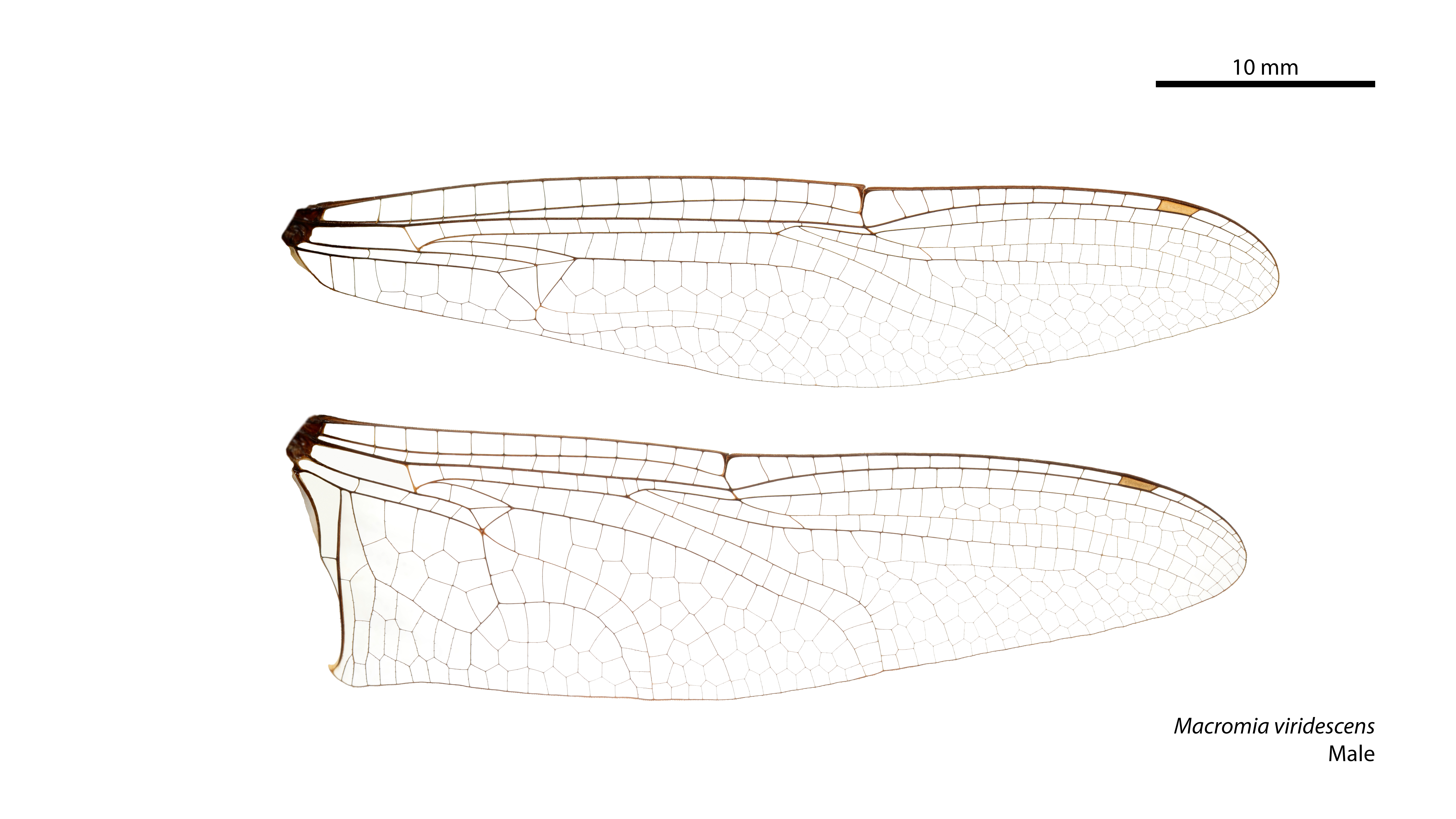
Male wings

== See also ==
- List of Odonata species of Australia
