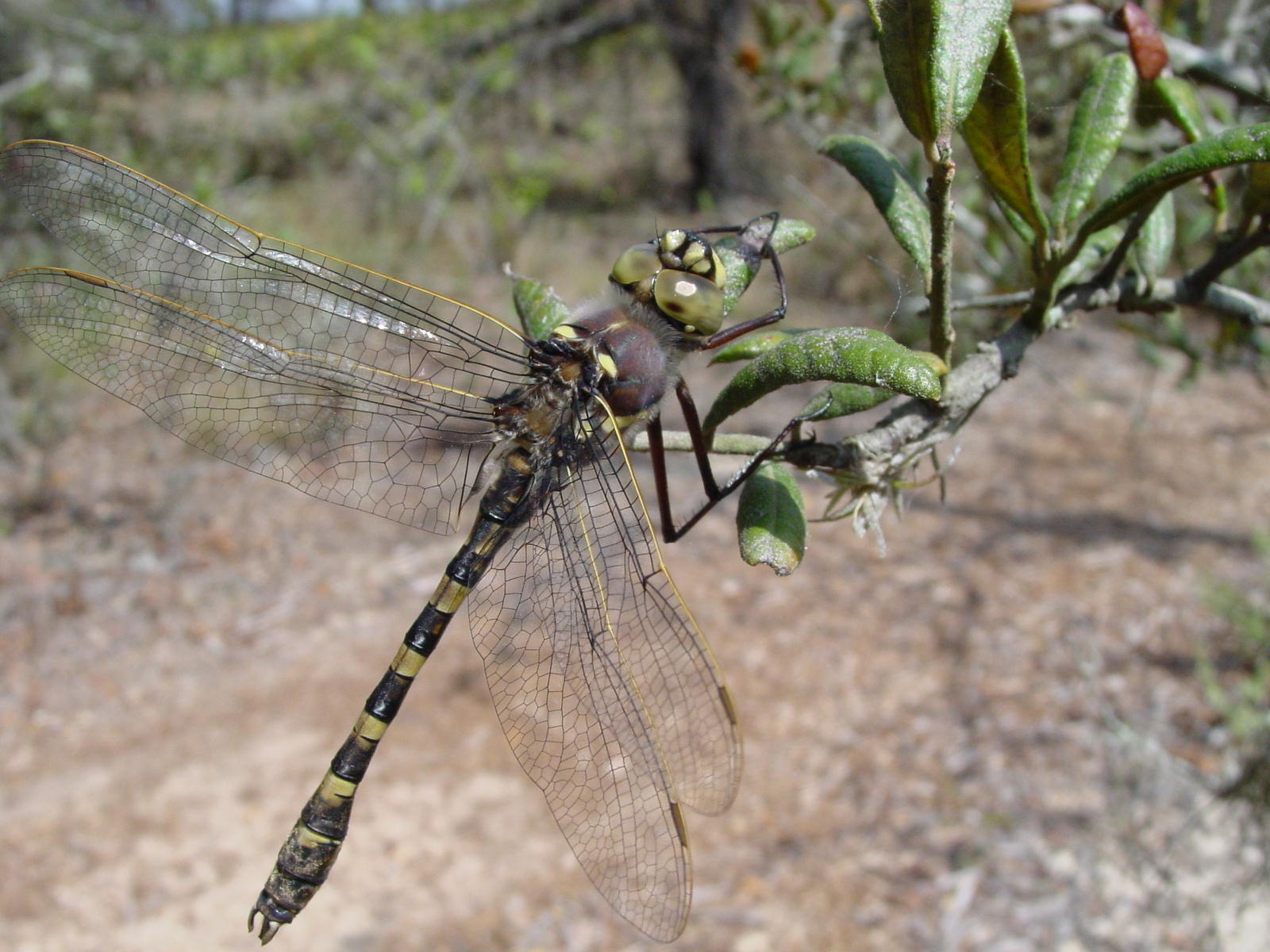

Conservation status
- Least Concern (IUCN 3.1)

Scientific classification
- Kingdom: Animalia
- Phylum: Arthropoda
- Clade: Pancrustacea
- Class: Insecta
- Order: Odonata
- Infraorder: Anisoptera
- Superfamily: Libelluloidea
- Family: Macromiidae
- Genus: Macromia
- Species: M. floridensis

Binomial name
- Macromia floridensis Davis, 1921

Synonyms
- Didymops floridensis (Davis, 1921)

= Macromia floridensis =

Species of dragonfly

Macromia floridensis, commonly known as the Florida cruiser, is a species of dragonfly in the family Macromiidae. It is found in North America.

The species was formerly placed in the genus Didymops, which molecular analysis found to be nested within Macromia and is now treated as its synonym.

The species is classified as least concern on the IUCN Red List, where it was assessed under the name Didymops floridensis.
