= Macromia kubokaiya =

Conservation status
- Endangered (IUCN 2.3)

Scientific classification
- Kingdom: Animalia
- Phylum: Arthropoda
- Class: Insecta
- Order: Odonata
- Infraorder: Anisoptera
- Family: Macromiidae
- Genus: Macromia
- Species: M. kubokaiya

Binomial name
- Macromia kubokaiya Asahina, 1964

Species of dragonfly

Macromia kubokaiya is a species of dragonfly in the family Macromiidae. It is endemic to Japan.
