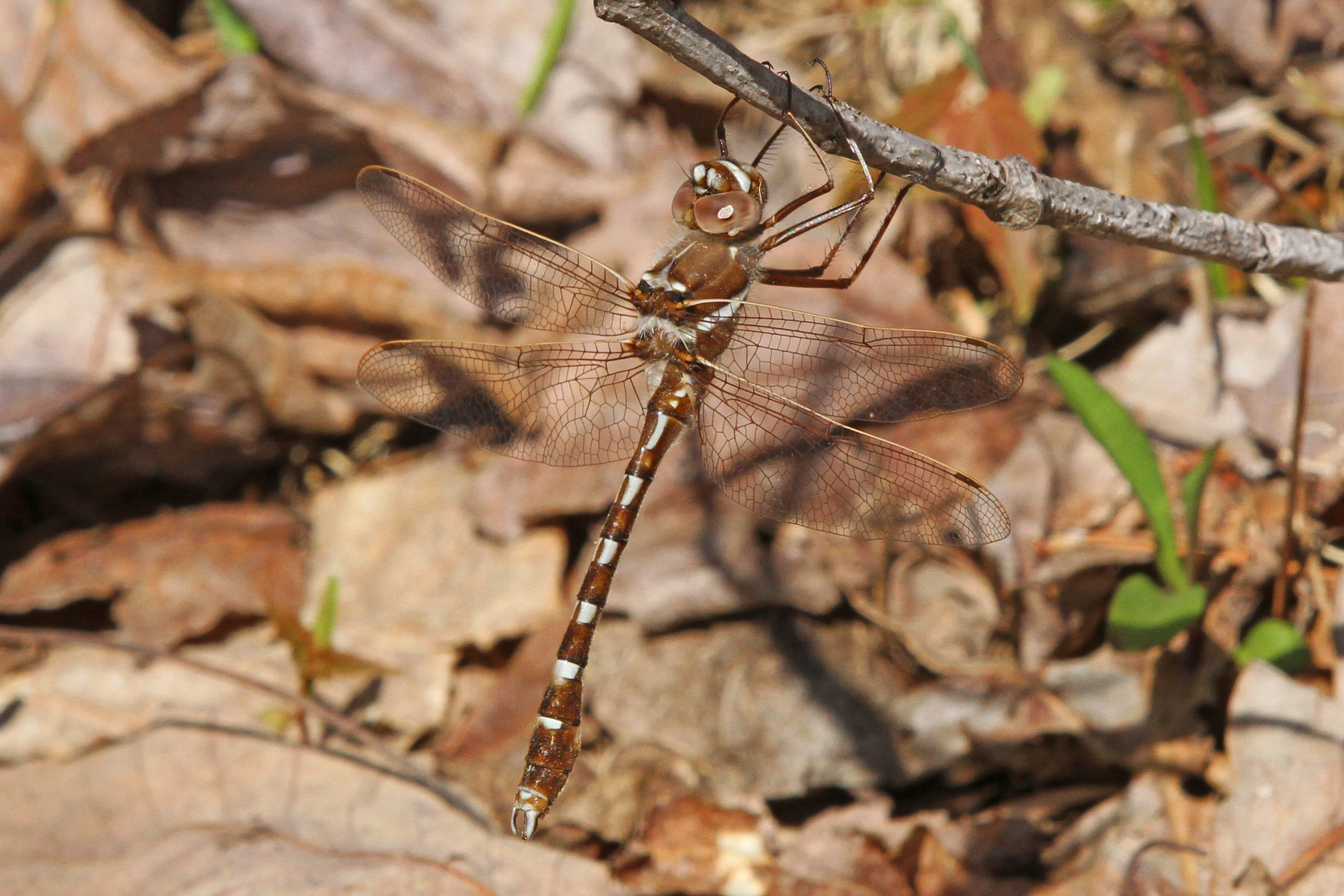

Conservation status
- Least Concern (IUCN 3.1)

Scientific classification
- Kingdom: Animalia
- Phylum: Arthropoda
- Clade: Pancrustacea
- Class: Insecta
- Order: Odonata
- Infraorder: Anisoptera
- Superfamily: Libelluloidea
- Family: Macromiidae
- Genus: Macromia
- Species: M. transversa

Binomial name
- Macromia transversa (Say, 1839)

Synonyms
- Epophthalmia cinnamomea Burmeister, 1839; Didymops servillii Rambur, 1842; Didymops transversa (Say, 1840); Libellula transversa Say, 1840

= Macromia transversa =

Species of dragonfly

Macromia transversa, commonly known as the stream cruiser, is a species of dragonfly in the family Macromiidae. It is found in North America.

The species was formerly placed in the genus Didymops, which molecular analysis found to be nested within Macromia and is now treated as its synonym.

The species is classified as least concern on the IUCN Red List, where it was assessed under the name Didymops transversa in 2017. Its population was reported to be stable.

== Gallery ==
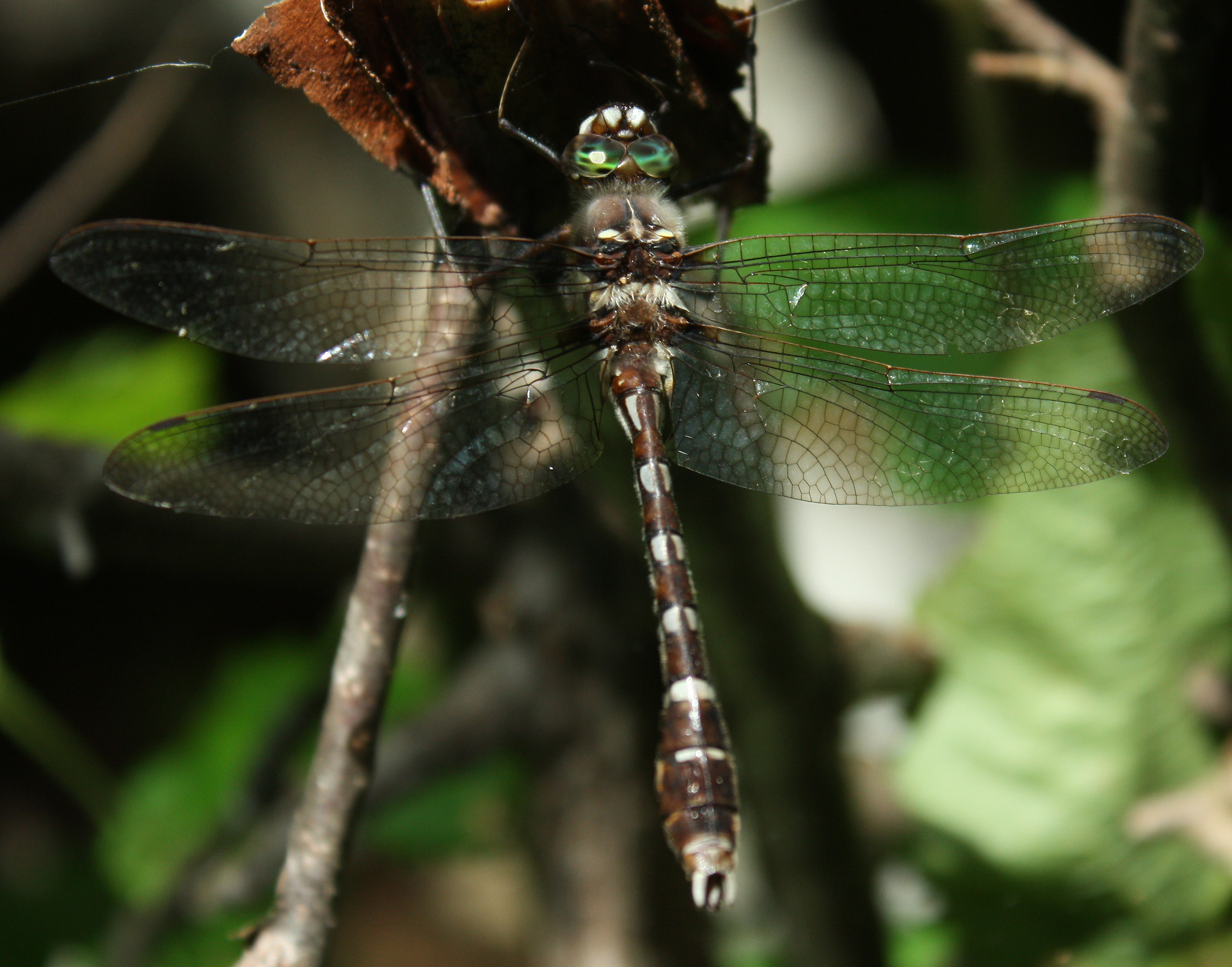
Stream cruiser, Macromia transversa

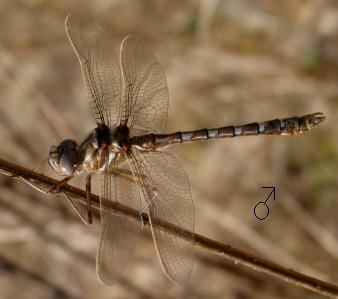
Stream cruiser, Macromia transversa
