= Macromia indica =

Conservation status
- Data Deficient (IUCN 3.1)

Scientific classification
- Kingdom: Animalia
- Phylum: Arthropoda
- Class: Insecta
- Order: Odonata
- Infraorder: Anisoptera
- Family: Macromiidae
- Genus: Macromia
- Species: M. indica

Binomial name
- Macromia indica Fraser, 1924

Species of dragonfly

Macromia indica is a species of dragonfly in the family Macromiidae. It is an endemic dragonfly and found only in Western Ghats in India.

== Description and habitat ==
It is a medium-sized dragonfly with emerald-green eyes. Its thorax is reddish-brown, with a dark green metallic reflex. There is a narrow oblique stripe on each side in citron-yellow. Abdomen is black, with the yellow annules brighter and broader. Segment 2 has a very broad annule, covering quite half the length of segment. Aall annules on segments 3 to 6 broadly confluent over dorsum and confluent below with abdominal spots. There is a basal spot on segment 8. Segment 10 has a strong mid-dorsal carina. Anal appendages are black.

The very broad annules on the abdomen and the dark blackish-brown patch at the bases of its wings distinguish it from other Macromia species.

This species usually found patrolling the banks of the rivers.

== See also ==
- List of odonates of India
- List of odonata of Kerala
