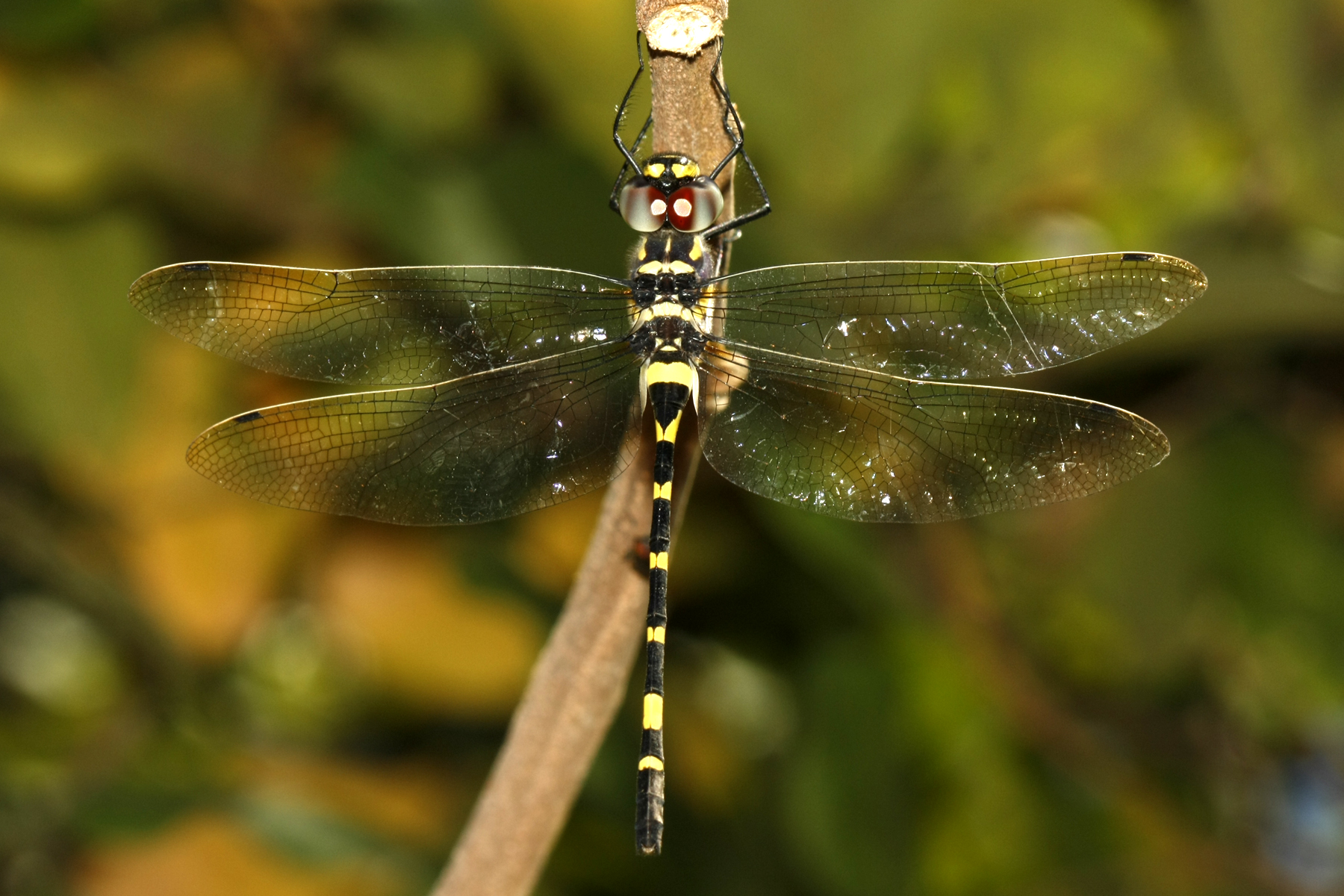
- female

Conservation status
- Data Deficient (IUCN 3.1)

Scientific classification
- Kingdom: Animalia
- Phylum: Arthropoda
- Clade: Pancrustacea
- Class: Insecta
- Order: Odonata
- Infraorder: Anisoptera
- Superfamily: Libelluloidea
- Family: Macromiidae
- Genus: Macromia
- Species: M. flavicincta

Binomial name
- Macromia flavicincta Selys, 1874

= Macromia flavicincta =

Species of dragonfly

Macromia flavicincta is a species of dragonfly in the family Macromiidae. It is an endemic dragonfly in India.

== Description ==
It is a medium sized dragonfly with emerald-green eyes. Its thorax is dark brown with a blue metallic reflex, marked with citron-yellow. There is a rather broad humeral stripe, an oblique lateral stripe on mesepimeron, and a narrow stripe on the posterior border of metepimeron. Abdomen is black, ringed with citron-yellow. Segment 2 has its basal half yellow. Segments 3 to 6 have the whole space from jugal suture to base of segment yellow. But the extreme basal area is reddish-brown, cutting into the yellow annule dorsally. Segment 7 has a broad ring covering more than the basal half. Segment 8 has a similar ring covering rather less than the basal half. Segment 9 has a small baso-lateral transverse spot. Segment 10 is unmarked. Anal appendages are ochreous.

This species can be distinguished from other Macromia by its very broad abdominal yellow annules, entirely yellow labium, and by the black T-shaped mark on the frons.

== See also ==
- List of odonates of India
- List of odonata of Kerala
