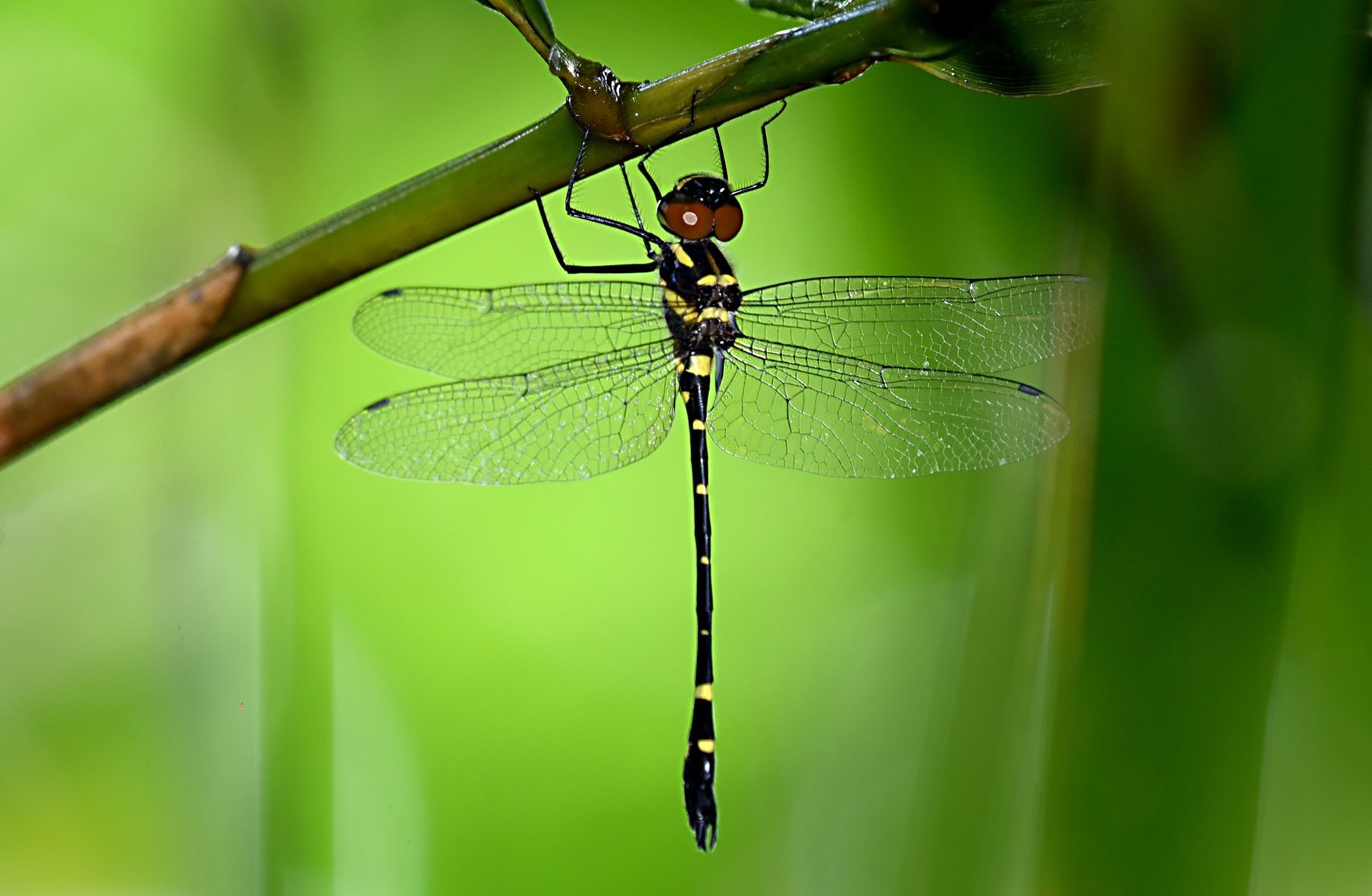
- Male

Conservation status
- Least Concern (IUCN 3.1)

Scientific classification
- Kingdom: Animalia
- Phylum: Arthropoda
- Class: Insecta
- Order: Odonata
- Infraorder: Anisoptera
- Family: Macromiidae
- Genus: Macromia
- Species: M. flavocolorata

Binomial name
- Macromia flavocolorata Fraser, 1922

Synonyms
- Macromia fraenata Laidlaw, 1922; Macromia miniata Fraser, 1924; Macromia thalia Lieftinck, 1929

= Macromia flavocolorata =

Species of dragonfly

Macromia flavocolorata is a species of dragonfly in the family Macromiidae. This species is widely distributed in India, Nepal, Thailand, Laos, Vietnam and China.

== Description and habitat ==
It is a medium-sized dragonfly with emerald-green eyes. Its thorax is dark metallic blue, marked with citron-yellow. There is a well-defined humeral stripe, an oblique narrow stripe on the mesepimeron, and a narrow stripe on the posterior border of the metepimeron. Abdomen is black, marked with citron-yellow. The basal half of segment 2 is yellow. Segment 3 has paired dorsal spots apposed to the basal side of jugum, and a baso-lateral triangular spot on each side. Segments 4 to 6 have the paired dorsal spots. Segment 7 has a basal annule occupying about one-third the length of segment. Segment 8 has a large triangular basal dorsal spot and a quadrate spot at the base on each side. Segments 9 and 10 are unmarked. Anal appendages are black.

This species usually found hawking over shallow streams where it breeds.

== See also ==
- List of odonates of India
- List of odonata of Kerala
