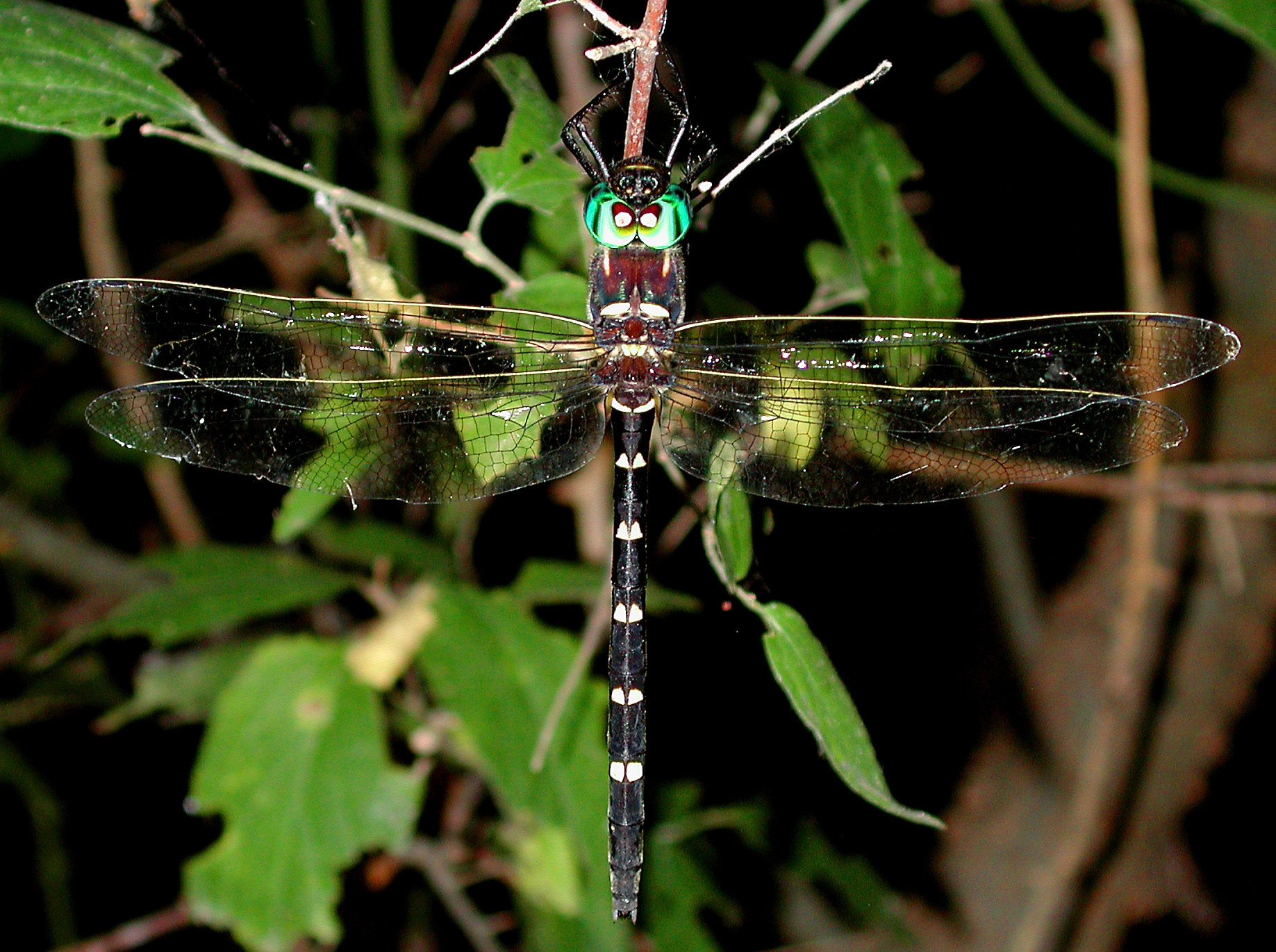

Scientific classification
- Kingdom: Animalia
- Phylum: Arthropoda
- Class: Insecta
- Order: Odonata
- Infraorder: Anisoptera
- Family: Macromiidae
- Genus: Macromia
- Species: M. illinoiensis

Binomial name
- Macromia illinoiensis (Walsh, 1862)

= Macromia illinoiensis =

Species of dragonfly

Macromia illinoiensis, also known as the swift river cruiser or the Illinois river cruiser, is a species of dragonfly in the family Macromiidae. It was described by Walsh in 1862.
