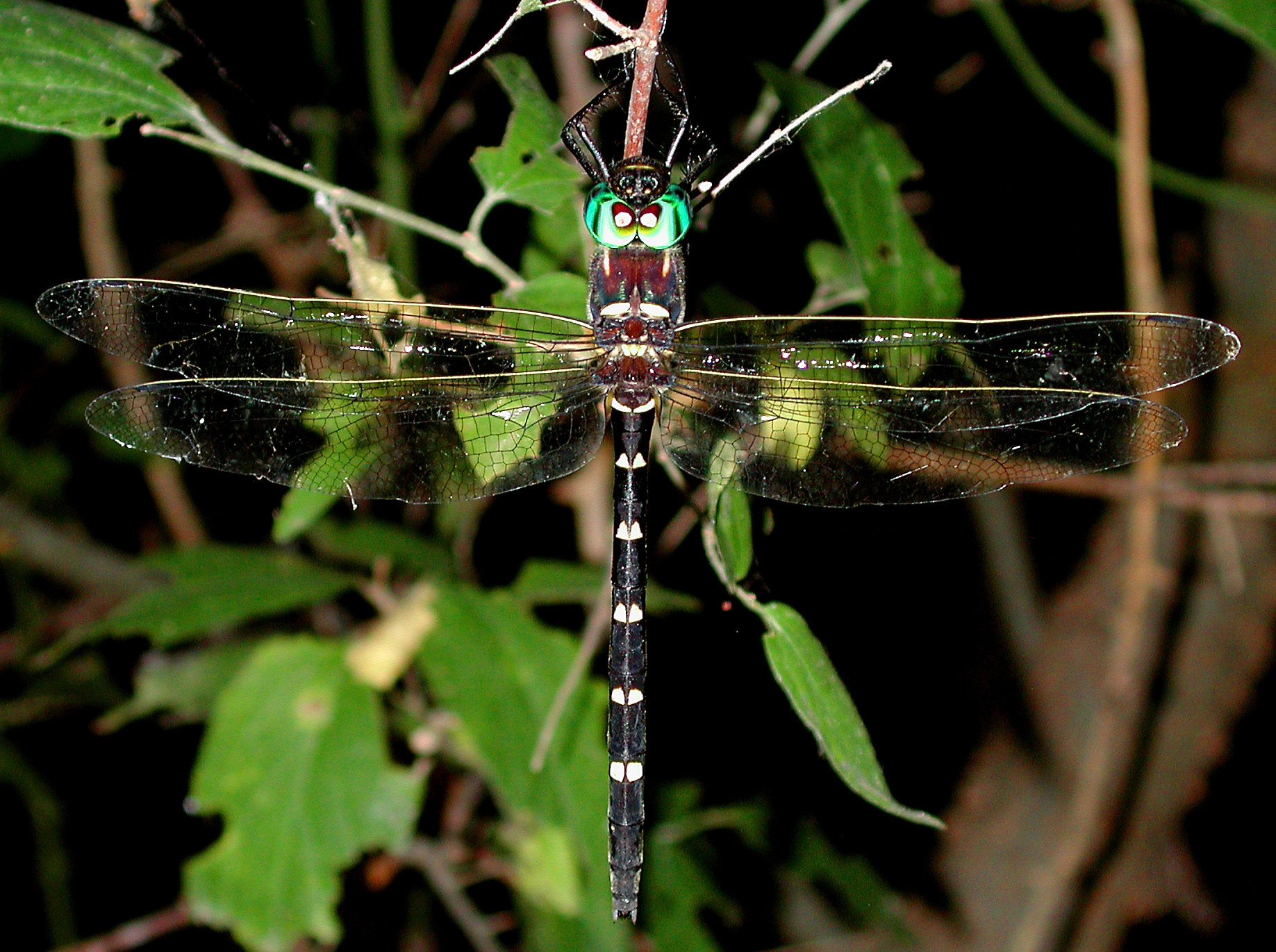
- Macromia illinoiensis

Scientific classification
- Kingdom: Animalia
- Phylum: Arthropoda
- Clade: Pancrustacea
- Class: Insecta
- Order: Odonata
- Infraorder: Anisoptera
- Superfamily: Libelluloidea
- Family: Macromiidae; Needham, 1903

Genera
- Epophthalmia; Macromia; Phyllomacromia
- Distribution of Macromiidae

= Macromiidae =

Family of dragonflies

Macromiidae is a family of dragonflies. The family contains species known as cruisers or skimmers. They are known to fly over bodies of water and roads. They are similar to Aeshnidae in size, but with green eyes that barely meet at the top of their head.

The family Macromiidae is in the superfamily Libelluloidea. It contains three genera and 125 species worldwide.

Females of this family lack an ovipositor at the end of their abdomen and lay their eggs by dipping their abdomen in water as they fly over. Ovipositing is usually done without a male present.

Members of the family are found on every continent, but there are very few records from South America and much of Europe and central Eurasia. They are most observed in East and Southeast Asia, North America, and sub-Saharan Africa.

== Early stages ==
Naiads hatch after two weeks and are born with three gills for respiration.

Naiads are found in rivers, streams, and lakes where there is water movement. They crawl in debris at the water's bottom and wait for prey. They mostly eat mosquito larvae, freshwater shrimp, fish and tadpoles.

== Genera ==
The following genera are currently placed in Macromiidae:

- Epophthalmia Burmeister, 1839
- Macromia Rambur, 1842
- Phyllomacromia Selys, 1878

== Etymology ==
The family name Macromiidae is derived from the type genus Macromia, with the standard zoological suffix -idae used for animal families.

The genus name Macromia is derived from the Greek μακρός (makros, "long") and ὦμος (ōmos, "shoulder"), referring to the species’ long tarsal claws.
