= List of least concern insects =

- Extinct in the wild (EW): 1 species
- Critically endangered (CR): 520 species
- Endangered (EN): 1,132 species
- Vulnerable (VU): 1,082 species
- Near threatened (NT, LR/cd): 897 species
- Least concern (LC): 6,802 species
- Data deficient (DD): 3,255 species
Insect species (IUCN, 2025-2)
- 13,696 extant species have been evaluated
- 10,441 of those are fully assessed (Note: excludes data deficient evaluations.)
- 7,699 are not threatened at present
- 2,742 to 5,997 are threatened (Note: Threatened comprises CR, EN and VU. Upper estimate additionally includes DD.)
- 59 to 175 are extinct or extinct in the wild:
  - 58 extinct (EX) species (Note: Chart omits extinct (EX) species)
  - 1 extinct in the wild (EW)
  - 116 possibly extinct [CR(PE)]
  - 0 possibly extinct in the wild [CR(PEW)]

As of July 2016, the International Union for Conservation of Nature (IUCN) lists 2843 least concern insect species. 47% of all evaluated insect species are listed as least concern. The IUCN also lists 12 insect subspecies as least concern.

No subpopulations of insects have been evaluated by the IUCN.

This is a complete list of least concern insect species and subspecies as evaluated by the IUCN.

== Earwigs ==
- Spirolabia browni

== Blattodea ==
- Desmosia alluaudi
- Distichopis stylopyga
- Miriamrothschildia gardineri
- Miriamrothschildia labrynthica
- Parasigmoidella reticulata
- Sliferia acuticerca
- Sliferia depressiceps
- Sliferia lineaticollis

== Phasmatodea ==
- Alluaud's stick insect (Carausius alluaudi)
- Gardiner's stick insect (Carausius gardineri)
- Seychelles stick insect (Carausius sechellensis)
- Seychelles leaf insect (Phyllium bioculatum)

== Termites ==
- Nasutitermes maheensis
- Neotermes laticollis

== Orthoptera ==
There are 184 species and six subspecies in the order Orthoptera assessed as least concern.

=== Crickets ===
- Metioche perpusilla
- Cyprian stripe-headed cricket (Modicogryllus cyprius)
- Cretan glandular cricket (Ovaliptila lindbergi)
- Epirus glandular cricket (Ovaliptila newmanae)
- Polionemobius modestus
- Zarceomorpha abdita
- Zarceus fallaciosus

=== Acridids ===
- Slender burrowing grasshopper (Acrotylus patruelis)
- Tenerife rock grasshopper (Arminda brunneri)
- Gran Canaria rock grasshopper (Arminda burri)
- Fuerteventura rock grasshopper (Arminda fuerteventurae)
- Lanzarote rock grasshopper (Arminda lancerottensis)
- Gomera rock grasshopper (Arminda latifrons)
- Palma rock grasshopper (Arminda palmae)
- East African sword grasshopper (Brachycrotaphus sjostedti)
- Canarian pincer grasshopper (Calliptamus plebeius)
- Tabora grasshopper (Catantops tanganus)
- Cretan grasshopper (Chorthippus biroi)
- Common field grasshopper (Chorthippus brunneus)
- Piedmont grasshopper (Chorthippus cialancensis)
- Morea grasshopper (Chorthippus moreanus)
- Cephalonia grasshopper (Chorthippus sangiorgii)
- Willemse's grasshopper (Chorthippus willemsei)
- East African forest grasshopper (Coenona brevipedalis)
- Eastern Arc forest grasshopper (Heteracris coerulipes)
- Baccetti's apennine grasshopper (Italopodisma baccettii)
- Costa's apennine grasshopper (Italopodisma costae)
- Reatine apennine grasshopper (Italopodisma ebneri)
- Canarian band-winged grasshopper (Oedipoda canariensis)
- Cretan band-winged grasshopper (Oedipoda venusta)
- Purpurarian grasshopper (Omocestus simonyi)
- Cyprian maquis grasshopper (Pezotettix cypria)
- Rhodes maquis grasshopper (Pezotettix lagoi)
- Fuerteventura sand grasshopper (Sphingonotus fuerteventurae)
- Lanzarote sand grasshopper (Sphingonotus pachecoi)
- Red sand grasshopper (Sphingonotus sublaevis)
- Cañadas sand grasshopper (Sphingonotus willemsei)
- Apennine toothed grasshopper (Stenobothrus apenninus)

=== Tettigoniids ===
Species

- Armoured katydid (Acanthoplus discoidalis)
- Long-legged armoured katydid (Acanthoplus longipes)
- Speiser's armoured katydid (Acanthoplus speiseri)
- Antlered thorny katydid (Acanthoproctus cervinus)
- Skeleton coast thorny katydid (Acanthoproctus diadematus)
- Striped thorny katydid (Acanthoproctus vittatus)
- Limpopo false shieldback (Acilacris obovatus)
- Alfred's shieldback (Alfredectes semiaeneus)
- Farrell's delicate katydid (Amyttacta farrelli)
- Rentz's false shieldback (Aroegas rentzi)
- East coast flat-necked shieldback (Arytropteris granulithorax)
- Wood-louse glandular bush-cricket (Bradyporus oniscus)
- Common ceresia (Ceresia pulchripes)
- Eastern black-winged clonia (Clonia assimilis)
- Namibian clonia (Clonia caudata)
- Kalahari clonia (Clonia kalahariensis)
- Giant black-winged clonia (Clonia melanoptera)
- Small wavy clonia (Clonia minuta)
- Saussure's black-winged clonia (Clonia saussurei)
- Yellow-winged clonia (Clonia tessellata)
- Van Son's wavy clonia (Clonia vansoni)
- Common wavy clonia (Clonia vittata)
- Wahlberg's clonia (Clonia wahlbergi)
- Long-tailed meadow katydid (Conocephalus caudalis)
- African cone-head (Conocephalus conocephalus)
- Yellowtail meadow katydid (Conocephalus iris)
- Elongate meadow katydid (Conocephalus longiceps)
- Spotted meadow katydid (Conocephalus maculatus)
- Common restio katydid (Conocephalus montana)
- Northern armoured katydid (Enyaliopsis transvaalensis)
- Epirus marbled bush-cricket (Eupholidoptera epirotica)
- Cyclades marbled bush-cricket (Eupholidoptera kykladica)
- Greek marbled bush-cricket (Eupholidoptera megastyla)
- Short-winged spiny bush-cricket (Gampsocleis abbreviata)
- Steppe spiny bush-cricket (Gampsocleis glabra)
- Bachmann's armoured katydid (Hemihetrodes bachmanni)
- Koringkriek (Hetrodes pupus)
- Southern black-faced katydid (Lanista annulicornis)
- Olympus meadow bush-cricket (Metrioptera tsirojanni)
- Ebner's modest bush-cricket (Modestana ebneri)
- Peringuey's ambush katydid (Peringueyella jocosa)
- Spear reed katydid (Pseudorhynchus hastifer)
- Sub-saharan reed katydid (Pseudorhynchus pungens)
- Toothless bush-cricket (Rhacocleis edentata)
- Greek bush-cricket (Rhacocleis graeca)
- Cyclades bush-cricket (Rhacocleis insularis)
- Robust conehead katydid (Ruspolia ampla)
- Greek predatory bush-cricket (Saga hellenica)
- Two-colored seedpod shieldback (Thoracistus viridifer)
- Zulu shieldback (Zuludectes modestus)

Subspecies

- Clonia wahlbergi wahlbergi
- Lesser reed katydid (Pseudorhynchus pungens meridionalis)

=== Rhaphidophorids ===
- Naoussa cave-cricket (Dolichopoda hussoni)
- Aghias Andreas cave-cricket (Dolichopoda lustriae)
- Makrykapa cave-cricket (Dolichopoda makrykapa)
- Palpate cave cricket (Dolichopoda palpata)
- Petalas cave-cricket (Dolichopoda patrizii)
- Remy's cave-cricket (Dolichopoda remyi)
- Katafygi cave-cricket (Dolichopoda unicolor)
- Orchomenos cave-cricket (Dolichopoda vandeli)
- Common cave-cricket (Troglophilus cavicola)
- Lago's cave-cricket (Troglophilus lagoi)
- Spiny cave-cricket (Troglophilus spinulosus)

=== Phaneropterids ===
Species

- Elegant sylvan katydid (Acauloplax exigua)
- Cretan long-legged bush-cricket (Acrometopa cretensis)
- African mecopod (Anoedopoda lamellata)
- Namibian black-kneed katydid (Aprosphylus hybridus)
- Olszanowski's black-kneed katydid (Aprosphylus olszanowskii)
- Giant leaf katydid (Arantia fasciata)
- Cape flightless katydid (Austrodontura capensis)
- Wilson's winter katydid (Brinckiella wilsoni)
- Slender leaf katydid (Catoptropteryx aurita)
- Corymeta (Corymeta amplectens)
- Common bark katydid (Cymatomera denticollis)
- Greater bark katydid (Cymatomerella spilophora)
- Angolan ducetia (Ducetia sagitta)
- Long-legged leaf katydid (Eulioptera flexilima)
- Reticulated leaf katydid (Eulioptera reticulata)
- Spined katydid (Eulioptera spinulosa)
- Kalahari oblong-eyed katydid (Eurycorypha cereris)
- Lesne's oblong-eyed katydid (Eurycorypha lesnei)
- African oblong-eyed katydid (Eurycorypha meruensis)
- Eastern oblong-eyed katydid (Eurycorypha proserpinae)
- Cape agile katydid (Griffiniana capensis)
- Long-winged agile katydid (Griffiniana longipes)
- Dimorphic leaf katydid (Horatosphaga serrifera)
- Namibian dimorphic leaf katydid (Horatosphaga stylifera)
- Andreeva's plump bush-cricket (Isophya andreevae)
- Bures' plump bush-cricket (Isophya bureschi)
- Durmitor plump bush-cricket (Isophya clara)
- Limnos plump bush-cricket (Isophya lemnotica)
- Miksic's plump bush-cricket (Isophya miksici)
- Blunt plump bush-cricket (Isophya obtusa)
- Plevne plump bush-cricket (Isophya plevnensis)
- Rhodope plump bush-cricket (Isophya rhodopensis)
- Showy plump bush-cricket (Isophya speciosa)
- Thrace plump bush-cricket (Isophya thracica)
- Tosevsk's plump bush-cricket (Isophya tosevski)
- Brunner's melidia (Melidia brunneri)
- Greek ornate bush-cricket (Metaplastes oertzeni)
- Balkan ornate bush-cricket (Metaplastes ornatus)
- Flap-eared leaf katydid (Oxyecous lesnei)
- Pelerinus rostratus
- Arabian sickle bush-cricket (Phaneroptera sparsa)
- Black-spotted plangia (Plangia compressa)
- Krompokkel (Plangia graminea)
- Aegean bright bush-cricket (Poecilimon aegaeus)
- Balkan bright bush-cricket (Poecilimon affinis)
- Lost bright bush-cricket (Poecilimon amissus)
- Enlarged bright bush-cricket (Poecilimon ampliatus)
- Pelopponesian bright bush-cricket (Poecilimon artedentatus)
- Cretan bright bush-cricket (Poecilimon cretensis)
- Dodecanese bright bush-cricket (Poecilimon deplanatus)
- Ebner's bright bush-cricket (Poecilimon ebneri)
- Ege bright bush-cricket (Poecilimon ege)
- Erimanthos bright bush-cricket (Poecilimon erimanthos)
- Gerlind's bright bush-cricket (Poecilimon gerlindae)
- Slender bright bush-cricket (Poecilimon gracilis)
- Hooked bright bush-cricket (Poecilimon hamatus)
- Heroic bright bush-cricket (Poecilimon heroicus)
- Macedonian bright bush-cricket (Poecilimon hoelzeli)
- Marianne's bright bush-cricket (Poecilimon mariannae)
- Noble bright bush-cricket (Poecilimon nobilis)
- Obese bright bush-cricket (Poecilimon obesus)
- Orbelicos bright bush-cricket (Poecilimon orbelicus)
- Similar bright bush-cricket (Poecilimon propinquus)
- Saint-paul's bright bush-cricket (Poecilimon sanctipauli)
- Poecilimon thessalicus
- Single-spined bright bush-cricket (Poecilimon unispinosus)
- Veluchi bright bush-cricket (Poecilimon veluchianus)
- Werner's bright bush-cricket (Poecilimon werneri)
- Zimmer's bright bush-cricket (Poecilimon zimmeri)
- Kalahari dimorphic leaf katydid (Prosphaga calaharica)
- Lace-winged katydid (Pseudosaga maculata)
- Acacia katydid (Terpnistria lobulata)
- Zebra katydid (Terpnistria zebrata)
- Striped grass katydid (Tylopsis bilineolata)
- Common grass katydid (Tylopsis continua)
- Elongate grass katydid (Tylopsis rubrescens)
- Blue-legged sylvan katydid (Zabalius ophthalmicus)
- Tsitsikamma katydid (Zitsikama tessellata)

Subspecies

- Eulioptera reticulata leptomorpha
- Eulioptera reticulata reticulata
- Isophya longicaudata adamovici
- Isophya rhodopensis leonorae

=== Other Orthoptera species ===
- African sandhopper (Afrotridactylus usambaricus)
- Seychelles monkey grasshopper (Euschmidtia cruciformis)
- Swahili monkey grasshopper (Euschmidtia sansibarica)
- Krimbas' mole-cricket (Gryllotalpa krimbasi)
- Niphetogryllacris fryeri
- Prosopogryllacris sechellensis
- Cyprian stick grasshopper (Pyrgomorpha cypria)

== Hymenoptera ==
There are 106 species in the order Hymenoptera assessed as least concern.

=== Ants ===
- Temnothorax recedens

=== Colletids ===
- Colletes hederae
- Colletes pannonicus
- Colletes schmidi
- Colletes tuberculiger
- Hylaeus ater

=== Melittids ===
- Dasypoda morotei
- Dasypoda pyriformis
- Macropis europaea

=== Apids ===
- Amegilla canifrons
- Anthophora alluaudi
- White shouldered bumble bee (Bombus appositus)
- Black and gold bumble bee (Bombus auricomus)
- Bombus baeri
- Two form bumble bee (Bombus bifarius)
- Two-spotted bumble bee (Bombus bimaculatus)
- Northern amber bumble bee (Bombus borealis)
- Central bumble bee (Bombus centralis)
- Lemon cuckoo bumblebee (Bombus citrinus)
- Bombus coccineus
- Bombus ephippiatus
- Yellowhead bumblebee (Bombus flavifrons)
- Frigid bumblebee (Bombus frigidus)
- Bombus funebris
- Brown-belted bumblebee (Bombus griseocollis)
- Bombus handlirschi
- Hunt bumble bee (Bombus huntii)
- Common eastern bumblebee (Bombus impatiens)
- Indiscriminate cuckoo bumble bee (Bombus insularis)
- Bombus lapponicus
- Bombus macgregori
- Bombus magnus
- Black-tailed bumblebee (Bombus melanopygus)
- Fuzzy-horned bumble bee (Bombus mixtus)
- Bombus morio
- Nevada bumble bee (Bombus nevadensis)
- Bombus opifex
- Bombus pauloensis (Bombus atratus)
- Bombus perezi
- Bombus pereziellus
- Confusing bumblebee (Bombus perplexus)
- Bombus pyrenaeus
- Red-belted bumble bee (Bombus rufocinctus)
- Sanderson bumble bee (Bombus sandersoni)
- Sitka bumblebee (Bombus sitkensis)
- Forest bumble bee (Bombus sylvicola)
- Bombus ternarius
- Bombus transversalis
- Bombus trinominatus
- Half-black bumblebee (Bombus vagans)
- Van Dyke bumble bee (Bombus vandykei)
- Yellow-faced bumblebee (Bombus vosnesenskii)
- Bombus weisi
- Ceratina gravidula
- Epeolus alpinus
- Epeolus fallax
- Nomada atroscutellaris
- Nomada bluethgeni
- Nomada concolor
- Nomada coronata
- Nomada discedens
- Nomada fabriciana
- Nomada ferruginata
- Nomada flava
- Nomada fusca
- Nomada hirtipes
- Nomada melathoracica
- Nomada merceti
- Nomada piccioliana
- Nomada priesneri
- Nomada signata
- Nomada similis

=== Halictids ===
- Dufourea alpina
- Halictus concinnus
- Halictus frontalis
- Halictus langobardicus
- Lasioglossum alpigenum
- Lasioglossum arctifrons
- Lasioglossum bavaricum
- Lasioglossum chalcodes
- Lasioglossum laetum
- Lasioglossum viride
- Lasioglossum wollastoni

=== Andrenids ===
- Andrena anthrisci
- Andrena concinna
- Andrena leucolippa
- Andrena maderensis
- Andrena nuptialis
- Andrena rogenhoferi
- Andrena strohmella
- Andrena wollastoni
- Flavipanurgus flavus
- Flavipanurgus ibericus
- Flavipanurgus venustus
- Panurgus canescens
- Panurgus dentipes
- Panurgus meridionalis

=== Megachilids ===
- Hoplitis lepeletieri
- Hoplitis loti
- Hoplitis ochraceicornis
- Hoplitis ravouxi
- Hoplitis villosa
- Megachile lagopoda
- Megachile parietina
- Osmia alticola
- Osmia pilicornis

== Mantises ==
- Wingless mantis (Apteromantis aptera)
- Devil's flower mantis (Blepharopsis mendica)
- Sublime conehead mantis (Hypsicorypha gracilis)
- European mantis (Mantis religiosa)
- Seychelles mantis (Polyspilota seychelliana)

== Lepidoptera ==
Lepidoptera comprises moths and butterflies. There are 420 species and one subspecies in the order Lepidoptera assessed as least concern.

=== Swallowtail butterflies ===
- Chinese three-tailed swallowtail (Bhutanitis thaidina)
- Yellow zebra (Graphium deucalion)
- Tabitha's swordtail (Graphium dorcus)
- Meyer's triangle (Graphium meyeri)
- Dancing swallowtail (Graphium polistratus)
- Tabora white lady (Graphium taboranus)
- Paradise birdwing (Ornithoptera paradisea)
- Papilio acheron
- Common white-banded swallowtail (Papilio cyproeofila)
- White-banded swallowtail (Papilio echerioides)
- Corsican swallowtail (Papilio hospiton)
- Papilio toboroi
- Papilio weymeri
- Cretan festoon (Zerynthia cretica)

=== Lycaenids ===
- Braine's zulu (Alaena brainei)
- Barkly's copper (Aloeides barklyi)
- Red Hill copper (Aloeides egerides)
- Nolloth's copper (Aloeides nollothi)
- Acacia blue (Amblypodia vivarna)
- Ancema anysis
- Ancema ctesia
- Arnold's ciliate blue (Anthene arnoldi)
- Red forewing (Anthene fulvus)
- Anomalous ciliate blue (Anthene juba)
- Kersten's ciliate blue (Anthene kersteni)
- Large red spot ciliate blue (Anthene lusones)
- Anthene opalina
- Trimen's ciliate blue (Anthene otacilia)
- Pitman's ciliate blue (Anthene pitmani)
- Allard's silver-line (Apharitis allardi)
- Saharan silverline (Apharitis nilus)
- Common silver-line (Apharitis siphax)
- Rare silver-spot (Aphnaeus argyrocyclus)
- Crowned highflier (Aphnaeus coronae)
- Arhopala agesias
- Bushblue (Arhopala anthelus)
- Arhopala argentea
- Tamil oakblue (Arhopala bazaloides)
- Arhopala cleander
- Arhopala similis
- Spanish argus (Aricia morronensis)
- Green flash (Artipe eryx)
- Aslauga latifurca
- Prouvost's aslauga (Aslauga prouvosti)
- White-banded babul blue (Azanus isis)
- Hildegard's buff (Baliochila hildegarda)
- Lannin's buff (Baliochila singularis)
- Bullis stigmata
- Alternative bush blue (Cacyreus virilis)
- Angled Pierrot (Caleta caleta)
- Orange-banded protea butterfly (Capys alphaeus)
- Castalius fasciatus
- Crowley's epitola (Cerautola crowleyi)
- Common imperial (Cheritra freja)
- Beulah's opal (Chrysoritis beulah)
- Citrinophila unipunctata
- Crudaria capensis
- Lorquin's blue (Cupido lorquinii)
- Drupadia cindi
- Drupadia estella
- Purple giant epitola (Epitola urania)
- Western pearly (Eresiomera bicolor)
- Cookson's buff (Euthecta cooksoni)
- Western marble (Falcuna leonensis)
- Good's epitola (Geritola goodii)
- Paphos blue (Glaucopsyche paphos)
- Equatorial mountain blue (Harpendyreus aequatorialis)
- Congo tiger blue (Hewitsonia congoensis)
- Hypochrysops chrysargyra
- Diggles blue (Hypochrysops digglesi)
- Fiery jewel (Hypochrysops ignita)
- Hypolycaena auricostalis
- Shining fairy hairstreak (Hypolycaena coerulea)
- Black fairy hairstreak (Hypolycaena nigra)
- Hypophytala reducta
- Blotched sapphire (Iolaus creta)
- Yellow-banded sapphire (Iolaus diametra)
- Iolaus hemicyanus
- Iasis sapphire (Iolaus iasis)
- Ituri sapphire (Iolaus iturensis)
- Emerald sapphire (Iolaus laonides)
- Parallel sapphire (Iolaus paneperata)
- Dark jewel sapphire (Iolaus sciophilus)
- Nigerian sapphire gem (Iridana nigeriana)
- Jamides caerulea
- Druce's large woolly legs (Lachnocnema luna)
- Lachnocnema sosia
- Spanish purple hairstreak (Laeosopis roboris)
- Cream pierid blue (Larinopoda lircaea)
- Badham's blue (Lepidochrysops badhami)
- Barnes' blue (Lepidochrysops barnesi)
- Kitale giant cupid (Lepidochrysops kitale)
- Lesotho blue (Lepidochrysops lerothodi)
- Quickelberge's blue (Lepidochrysops quickelbergei)
- Leptomyrina boschi
- Cape black-eye (Leptomyrina lara)
- Canary blue (Leptotes webbianus)
- Lipaphnaeus loxura
- Modest false dots (Liptena modesta)
- Liptena praestans
- Liptena turbata
- Yellow liptena (Liptena xanthostola)
- Iberian sooty copper (Lycaena bleusei)
- Eastern harvester (Megalopalpus simplex)
- Common dots (Micropentila adelgitha)
- Micropentila ugandae
- Common acraea mimic (Mimacraea darwinia)
- Maessen's acraea mimic (Mimacraea maesseni)
- Mimacraea skoptoles
- Sharpe's fig tree blue (Myrina sharpei)
- Nacaduba sanaya
- Neoepitola barombiensis
- White imperial butterfly (Neomyrina nivea)
- Mimic liptena (Obania subvariegata)
- Liberian ginger white (Oboronia liberiana)
- Light ginger white (Oboronia pseudopunctatus)
- Ornipholidotos congoensis
- Ornipholidotos etoumbi
- Ornipholidotos gemina
- Ornipholidotos nbeti
- Large glasswing (Ornipholidotos peucetia)
- Common false head (Oxylides faunus)
- Paradeudorix eleala
- Western cream pentila (Pentila picena)
- Cator's fairy playboy (Pilodeudorix catori)
- Dark round-spot (Pilodeudorix leonina)
- Sombre diopetes (Pilodeudorix pseudoderitas)
- Bellier's blue (Plebejus bellieri)
- Glandon blue (Plebejus glandon)
- Spanish zephyr blue (Plebejus hespericus)
- Cretan argus (Plebejus psyloritus)
- Gavarnie blue (Plebejus pyrenaicus)
- Spanish chalkhill blue (Polyommatus albicans)
- Grecian anomalous blue (Polyommatus aroaniensis)
- Azure chalkhill blue (Polyommatus caelestissimus)
- Chalkhill blue (Polyommatus coridon)
- Furry blue (Polyommatus dolus)
- Oberthür's anomalous blue (Polyommatus fabressei)
- Catalan furry blue (Polyommatus fulgens)
- Provence chalkhill blue (Polyommatus hispanus)
- Spotted adonis blue (Polyommatus punctiferus)
- Andalusian anomalous blue (Polyommatus violetae)
- Pseudaletis camarensis
- Pseudaletis dolieri
- Pseudodipsas cephenes
- Baton blue (Pseudophilotes baton)
- Rapala rhodopis
- Spindasis kutu
- Taveta silverline (Spindasis tavetensis)
- Stempfferia badura
- Carpenter's sapphire (Stugeta carpenteri)
- Red imperial (Suasa lisides)
- Boniface's false head (Syrmoptera bonifacei)
- Le Gras' Pierrot (Tarucus legrasi)
- Western telipna (Telipna semirufa)
- Thaumaina uranothauma
- Thermoniphas distincta
- Brauns' skolly (Thestor braunsi)
- Moroccan hairstreak (Tomares mauretanicus)
- Larsen's glasswing (Torbenia larseni)
- White Pierrot (Tuxentius calice)
- Forest pied Pierrot (Tuxentius carana)
- Mountain Pierrot (Tuxentius margaritaceus)
- Una usta
- Antinori's branded blue (Uranothauma antinorii)
- Uranothauma cordatus
- Uranothauma delatorum
- Dark grass blue (Zizina antanossa)

=== Nymphalids ===
- Sardinian small tortoiseshell (Aglais ichnusa)
- Chief (Amauris echeria)
- Apatura parisatis
- Bebearia ikelemba
- Laetitia forester (Bebearia laetitia)
- Maligned forester (Bebearia maledicta)
- Fantasiella (Bebearia phantasiella)
- Bebearia severini
- Squinting bush-brown (Bicyclus anynana)
- Small stately bush-brown (Bicyclus evadne)
- Jeffery's bush-brown (Bicyclus jefferyi)
- Black bush-brown (Bicyclus martius)
- Lesser rock bush-brown (Bicyclus milyas)
- Smith's bush-brown (Bicyclus smithi)
- Fox's blue-banded bush-brown (Bicyclus sweadneri)
- Oberthür's pathfinder (Catuna oberthueri)
- Cethosia obscura
- Montane charaxes (Charaxes alpinus)
- Bocquet's demon charaxes (Charaxes bocqueti)
- Green-veined charaxes (Charaxes candiope)
- Silver demon charaxes (Charaxes catachrous)
- Demon charaxes (Charaxes etheocles)
- Charaxes fionae
- Charaxes grahamei
- Blue-spangled charaxes (Charaxes guderiana)
- Imperial blue charaxes (Charaxes imperialis)
- Charaxes phoebus
- Southern hermit (Chazara prieuri)
- Chersonesia excellens
- Chersonesia intermedia
- Cirrochroa regina
- Moroccan pearly heath (Coenonympha arcanioides)
- Corsican heath (Coenonympha corinna)
- Moroccan dusky heath (Coenonympha fettigii)
- Alpine heath (Coenonympha gardetta)
- Eastern large heath (Coenonympha rhodopensis)
- Cretan small heath (Coenonympha thyrsis)
- Cymothoe caenis
- Cream glider (Cymothoe consanguis)
- Cymothoe eris
- Cymothoe haynae
- Weymer's glider (Cymothoe weymeri)
- Zenker's glider (Cymothoe zenkeri)
- Straight line mapwing (Cyrestis nivea)
- Little mapwing (Cyrestis themire)
- False Mnestra ringlet (Erebia aethiopella)
- Almond-eyed ringlet (Erebia alberganus)
- Lorkovic's brassy ringlet (Erebia calcaria)
- Common brassy ringlet (Erebia cassioides)
- Small mountain ringlet (Erebia epiphron)
- Eriphyle ringlet (Erebia eriphyle)
- Silky ringlet (Erebia gorge)
- Gavarnie ringlet (Erebia gorgone)
- Spanish brassy ringlet (Erebia hispania)
- Lefèbvre's ringlet (Erebia lefebvrei)
- Yellow-spotted ringlet (Erebia manto)
- Lesser mountain ringlet (Erebia melampus)
- Black ringlet (Erebia melas)
- Piedmont ringlet (Erebia meolans)
- Mnestra's ringlet (Erebia mnestra)
- Marbled ringlet (Erebia montana)
- Autumn ringlet (Erebia neoridas)
- De Lesse's brassy ringlet (Erebia nivalis)
- Bright eyed ringlet (Erebia oeme)
- Bulgarian ringlet (Erebia orientalis)
- Chapman's ringlet (Erebia palarica)
- Blind ringlet (Erebia pharte)
- Sooty ringlet (Erebia pluto)
- Water ringlet (Erebia pronoe)
- Nicholl's ringlet (Erebia rhodopensis)
- Pyrenees brassy ringlet (Erebia rondoui)
- Larche ringlet (Erebia scipio)
- False dewy ringlet (Erebia sthennyo)
- Styrian ringlet (Erebia stiria)
- Stygian ringlet (Erebia styx)
- De Prunner's ringlet (Erebia triaria)
- Swiss brassy ringlet (Erebia tyndarus)
- Zapater's ringlet (Erebia zapateri)
- Erites elegans
- Eyed cyclops (Erites medura)
- Euphaedra abri
- Crosse's forester (Euphaedra crossei)
- Brown Ceres forester (Euphaedra delera)
- Western blue-banded forester (Euphaedra eupalus)
- Dark brown forester (Euphaedra losinga)
- Modest themis forester (Euphaedra modesta)
- Pear-banded forester (Euphaedra piriformis)
- Simple orange forester (Euphaedra simplex)
- Splendid themis forester (Euphaedra splendens)
- Themis forester (Euphaedra themis)
- Cynthia's fritillary (Euphydryas cynthia)
- Sulawesi striped blue crow (Euploea configurata)
- Euploea core
- Seram crow (Euploea dentiplaga)
- Pagenstecher's crow (Euploea doretta)
- Bismark crow (Euploea eboraci)
- Sulawesi pied crow (Euploea eupator)
- Weymer's crow (Euploea latifasciata)
- Western euptera (Euptera dorothea)
- Ducarme's euptera (Euptera ducarmei)
- Ituri euptera (Euptera ituriensis)
- Loma nymph (Euriphene lomaensis)
- Oban nymph (Euriphene obani)
- Mottled green nymph (Euryphura achlys)
- Euthalia dirtea
- Euthalia djata
- Euthalia malaccana
- White tipped baron (Euthalia merta)
- Fabriciana auresiana
- Corsican fritillary (Fabriciana elisa)
- Angular glider (Harma theobene)
- Common brown (Heteronympha merope)
- Eyed bush brown (Heteropsis perspicua)
- Mountain grayling (Hipparchia algirica)
- Southern grayling (Hipparchia aristaeus)
- Azores grayling (Hipparchia azorina)
- Sicilian grayling (Hipparchia blachieri)
- Moroccan rock grayling (Hipparchia caroli)
- Cretan grayling (Hipparchia cretica)
- Cyprus grayling (Hipparchia cypriensis)
- Gomera grayling (Hipparchia gomera)
- Austaut's grayling (Hipparchia hansii)
- Madeira grayling (Hipparchia maderensis)
- Samos grayling (Hipparchia mersina)
- Le Cerf's grayling (Hipparchia miguelensis)
- Italian grayling (Hipparchia neapolitana)
- Corsican grayling (Hipparchia neomiris)
- Powell's grayling (Hipparchia powelli)
- Grayling (Hipparchia semele)
- Tree grayling (Hipparchia statilinus)
- Gran Canaria grayling (Hipparchia tamadabae)
- Delattin's grayling (Hipparchia volgensis)
- Canary grayling (Hipparchia wyssii)
- Côte d'Ivoire eggfly (Hypolimnas aubergeri)
- Moroccan meadow brown (Hyponephele maroccana)
- Seram small tree-nymph (Ideopsis klassika)
- Ideopsis vulgaris
- Peacock pansy (Junonia almana)
- Yellow pansy (Junonia hierta)
- Dark blue pansy (Junonia oenone)
- Naval pansy (Junonia touhilimasa)
- Pale wall brown (Lasiommata paramegaera)
- Lasippa neriphus
- Cyprus meadow brown (Maniola cypricola)
- Turkish meadow brown (Maniola megala)
- Sardinian meadow brown (Maniola nurag)
- Italian marbled white (Melanargia arge)
- Iberian marbled white (Melanargia lachesis)
- Moroccan marbled white (Melanargia lucasi)
- Sicilian marbled white (Melanargia pherusa)
- Levantine marbled white (Melanargia titea)
- Aetherie fritillary (Melitaea aetherie)
- Little fritillary (Melitaea asteria)
- Meadow fritillary (Melitaea parthenoides)
- Algerian fritillary (Melitaea punica)
- Grisons fritillary (Melitaea varia)
- Moore's bushbrown (Mycalesis heri)
- Itys bush brown (Mycalesis itys)
- Common bush brown (Mycalesis janardana)
- Mycalesis lorna
- Barred false sailor (Neptidopsis fulgurata)
- Scalloped false sailor (Neptidopsis ophione)
- Celebes sailer (Neptis celebica)
- Original club sailer (Neptis melicerta)
- Clubbed sailer (Neptis nicoteles)
- Mountain sailer (Neptis occidentalis)
- Angled petty sailer (Neptis quintilla)
- Alpine grayling (Oeneis glacialis)
- Violet-banded palla (Palla violinitens)
- Crowley's tiger (Parantica crowleyi)
- Morishita's tiger (Parantica hypowattan)
- Kirby's tiger (Parantica kirbyi)
- Manado yellow tiger (Parantica menadensis)
- Least tiger (Parantica pumila)
- Fat tiger (Parantica rotundata)
- Weiske's tiger (Parantica weiskei)
- Canary speckled wood (Pararge xiphioides)
- Spotted-eye brown (Paternympha narycia)
- Toothed commodore (Precis frobeniusi)
- Gaudy commodore (Precis octavia)
- Montane commodore (Precis rauana)
- Glorious begum (Prothoe calydonia)
- Clouded mother-of-pearl (Protogoniomorpha anacardii)
- Martin's false sergeant (Pseudathyma martini)
- Pseudathyma plutonica
- Moroccan grayling (Pseudochazara atlantis)
- Grecian grayling (Pseudochazara graeca)
- Lydian tawny rockbrown (Pseudochazara lydia)
- Nevada grayling (Pseudochazara williamsi)
- Black satyr (Satyrus actaea)
- Satyrus virbius
- Velvet tree nymph (Sevenia occidentalium)
- Ochreous tree nymph (Sevenia umbrina)
- Robertson's brown (Stygionympha robertsoni)
- Symbrenthia hippalus
- Symbrenthia hypatia
- Taenaris horsfieldii
- Malay viscount (Tanaecia pelea)
- Spring widow (Tarsocera cassus)
- Dark jungle glory (Thaumantis noureddin)
- Scarce blue tiger (Tirumala gautama)
- Vanessa vulcania

=== Skippers ===
Species

- Southern marbled skipper (Carcharodus boeticus)
- False mallow skipper (Carcharodus tripolinus)
- Alpine grizzled skipper (Pyrgus andromedae)
- Foulquier's grizzled skipper (Pyrgus bellieri)
- Dusky grizzled skipper (Pyrgus cacaliae)
- Carline skipper (Pyrgus carlinae)
- Southern grizzled skipper (Pyrgus malvoides)
- Warren's skipper (Pyrgus warrenensis)
- Corsican red-underwing skipper (Spialia therapne)
- Thymelicus christi
- Moroccan small skipper (Thymelicus hamza)

Subspecies

- Oreisplanus munionga larana

=== Pierids ===
- Anthocharis belia
- Provence orange-tip (Anthocharis euphenoides)
- Socotran caper white (Belenois anomala)
- Calypso caper white (Belenois calypso)
- Raffray's white (Belenois raffrayi)
- Red-edged white (Belenois rubrosignata)
- Central caper white (Belenois theuszi)
- Banded gold tip (Colotis eris)
- Purple tip (Colotis ione)
- Yellow splendour (Colotis protomedia)
- Delias enniana
- Delias luctuosa
- Delias periboea
- Rosenberg's painted jezebel (Delias rosenbergi)
- Spotless black-veined small white (Dixeia leucophanes)
- Spanish greenish black-tip (Euchloe bazae)
- Euchloe eversi
- Euchloe grancanariensis
- Canary green-striped white (Euchloe hesperidum)
- Corsican dappled white (Euchloe insularis)
- Mountain dappled white (Euchloe simplonia)
- Eurema alitha
- One-spot yellow grass (Eurema andersoni)
- Small grass yellow (Eurema brigitta)
- Eurema tominia
- Real's wood white (Leptidea reali)
- Asphodel dotted border (Mylothris asphodelus)
- Mylothris continua
- Talbot's dotted border (Mylothris talboti)
- Balkan green-veined white (Pieris balcana)
- Ethiopian cabbage white (Pieris brassicoides)
- Bath white (Pontia daplidice)

=== Riodinids ===
- Delicate Judy (Abisara delicata)
- Abisara geza
- Scalloped Judy (Abisara rutherfordii)
- Dodona eugenes
- Laxita teneta
- Malay red harliquin (Paralaxita damajanti)
- Paralaxita orphna

== Beetles ==
There are 423 beetle species assessed as least concern.

=== Geotrupids ===
- Geotrupes douei
- Geotrupes ibericus
- Thorectes armifrons
- Thorectes escorialensis
- Thorectes geminatus
- Thorectes intermedius
- Thorectes laevigatus
- Thorectes nitidus
- Thorectes rugatulus
- Typhaeus typhaeoides

=== Longhorn beetles ===
- Brachypteroma ottomanum
- Callimus abdominalis
- Chlorophorus glabromaculatus
- Chlorophorus ruficornis
- Clytus lama
- Clytus tropicus
- Monochamus sartor
- Ropalopus femoratus

=== Click beetles ===
- Ampedus aethiops
- Ampedus apicalis
- Ampedus auripes
- Ampedus ochrinulus
- Ampedus triangulum
- Stenagostus rufus

=== Eucnemids ===
- Hylis cariniceps
- Hylis procerulus
- Isoriphis marmottani
- Microrhagus emyi
- Microrhagus lepidus
- Microrhagus pygmaeus
- Xylophilus corticalis

=== Scarabaeids ===
- Accrosus carpetanus
- Accrosus siculus
- Accrosus tingitanus
- Agoliinus ragusae
- Agrilinus ibericus
- Allogymnopleurus chloris
- Allogymnopleurus thalassinus
- Amidorus cribricollis
- Amidorus moraguesi
- Ammoecius dentatus
- Ammoecius elevatus
- Ammoecius franzi
- Ammoecius frigidus
- Amphistomus complanatus
- Amphistomus speculifer
- Anomiopus bonariensis
- Anomiopus nigrocoeruleus
- Anomiopus parallelus
- Anomiopus smaragdinus
- Anomiopus virescens
- Anomius annamariae
- Anomius baeticus
- Anomius castaneus
- Anomius segonzaci
- Aphodius algiricus
- Aphodius ghardimaouensis
- Aphodius orbignyi
- Aptenocanthon hopsoni
- Aptenocanthon winyar
- Ateuchetus laticollis
- Ateuchetus puncticollis
- Ateuchetus variolosus
- Ateuchus carbonarius
- Ateuchus latus
- Ateuchus murrayi
- Ateuchus puncticolle
- Aulacopris reichei
- Bdelyrus howdeni
- Besourenga horacioi
- Biralus mahunkaorum
- Bodilus barbarus
- Bodilus beduinus
- Bodilus longispina
- Boletoscapter furcatus
- Bubas bison
- Bubas bubaloides
- Bubas bubalus
- Caccobius cavatus
- Caccobius ferrugineus
- Caccobius nigritulus
- Calamosternus hyxos
- Calamosternus mayeri
- Canthidium bicolor
- Canthidium bokermanni
- Canthidium cavifrons
- Canthidium femoratum
- Canthidium guyanense
- Canthidium latum
- Canthidium manni
- Canthidium sladeni
- Canthidium viride
- Canthochilum anacaona
- Canthon angularis
- Canthon daguerrei
- Canthon deplanatus
- Canthon edentulus
- Canthon heyrovskyi
- Canthon janthinus
- Canthon laminatus
- Canthon lituratus
- Canthon lividus
- Canthon luctuosus
- Canthon lunatus
- Canthon mutabilis
- Canthon orfilai
- Canthon ornatus
- Canthon podagricus
- Canthon quinquemaculatus
- Canthon rubrescens
- Canthon rutilans
- Canthon septemmaculatus
- Canthon smaragdulus
- Canthon sordidus
- Canthon subhyalinus
- Canthon tetraodon
- Canthon triangularis
- Canthon unicolor
- Canthon virens
- Catharsius calaharicus
- Catharsius chinai
- Catharsius oedipus
- Catharsius pandion
- Cephalodesmius armiger
- Cephalodesmius laticollis
- Cheironitis audens
- Cheironitis furcifer
- Cheironitis scabrosus
- Chilothorax albosetosus
- Chilothorax exclamationis
- Chilothorax hieroglyphicus
- Chilothorax lineolatus
- Chilothorax naevuliger
- Chittius anatolicus
- Copris armiger
- Copris fallaciosus
- Copris fidius
- Copris inhalatus
- Copris pueli
- Copris umbilicatus
- Coprophanaeus corythus
- Coprophanaeus gamezi
- Coprophanaeus ohausi
- Coprophanaeus pertyi
- Coptodactyla lesnei
- Coptodactyla nitida
- Coptodactyla storeyi
- Cryptocanthon andersoni
- Cryptocanthon campbellorum
- Cyptochirus ambiguus
- Deltochilum batesi
- Deltochilum brasiliense
- Deltochilum carinatum
- Deltochilum guyanense
- Deltochilum icarus
- Deltochilum peruanum
- Deltochilum rubripenne
- Demarziella imitatrix
- Diastellopalpus infernalis
- Dichotomius apicalis
- Dichotomius calcaratus
- Dichotomius crinicollis
- Dichotomius glaucus
- Dichotomius nimuendaju
- Dichotomius planicollis
- Dichotomius podalirius
- Dichotomius prietoi
- Dichotomius punctulatipennis
- Dichotomius tristis
- Dichotomius worontzowi
- Dicranocara deschodti
- Diorygopyx niger
- Eodrepanus fastiditus
- Eodrepanus parallelus
- Epirinus gratus
- Epirinus validus
- Esymus helenaeliviae
- Esymus sesquivittatus
- Euheptaulacus atlantis
- Euoniticellus inaequalis
- Euoniticellus kawanus
- Euoniticellus nasicornis
- Euonthophagus crocatus
- Euonthophagus tissoni
- Euorodalus tersus
- Frankenbergerius armatus
- Garreta azureus
- Garreta malleolus
- Garreta nitens
- Gromphas aeruginosa
- Gromphas amazonica
- Gymnopleurus aenescens
- Gymnopleurus andreaei
- Gymnopleurus humanus
- Gymnopleurus reichei
- Gymnopleurus virens
- Gyronotus pumilus
- Hansreia affinis
- Heliocopris faunus
- Heliocopris japetus
- Heptaulacus rasettii
- Heteronitis castelnaui
- Homocopris torulosus
- Isocopris tarsalis
- Latodrepanus laticollis
- Lepanus bidentatus
- Lepanus politus
- Lepanus pygmaeus
- Lepanus ustulatus
- Lepanus villosus
- Liatongus arrowi
- Malagoniella argentina
- Malagoniella chalybaea
- Mecynodes leucopterus
- Mecynodes striatulus
- Melinopterus dellacasai
- Melinopterus stolzi
- Melinopterus tingens
- Melinopterus villarreali
- Mendidaphodius paganettii
- Metacatharsius inermis
- Metacatharsius pumilioniformis
- Monoplistes occidentalis
- Monoplistes phanophilus
- Monoplistes tropicus
- Neosisyphus fortuitus
- Neosisyphus macrorubrus
- Neosisyphus mirabilis
- Neosisyphus rubrus
- Nimbus franzinii
- Nimbus richardi
- Odontoloma endroedyi
- Odontoloma louwi
- Odontoloma pygidiale
- Onitis aerarius
- Onitis belial
- Onitis caffer
- Onitis fulgidus
- Onitis granulisetosus
- Onitis ion
- Onitis laminosus
- Onitis mendax
- Onitis obscurus
- Onitis robustus
- Onitis uncinatus
- Ontherus aequatorius
- Ontherus azteca
- Ontherus brevicollis
- Ontherus dentatus
- Ontherus erosioides
- Ontherus laminifer
- Ontherus obliquus
- Ontherus raptor
- Ontherus virescens
- Onthophagus aequepubens
- Onthophagus aethiopicus
- Onthophagus anchommatus
- Onthophagus andalusicus
- Onthophagus anisocerus
- Onthophagus asper
- Onthophagus atricapillus
- Onthophagus atrofasciatus
- Onthophagus atrox
- Onthophagus australis
- Onthophagus beiranus
- Onthophagus bicornis
- Onthophagus binyana
- Onthophagus bornemisszai
- Onthophagus bubalus
- Onthophagus bunamin
- Onthophagus capelliformis
- Onthophagus chepara
- Onthophagus cyaneoniger
- Onthophagus dellacasai
- Onthophagus depressus
- Onthophagus falzonii
- Onthophagus flavolimbatus
- Onthophagus fritschi
- Onthophagus fuscivestis
- Onthophagus giraffa
- Onthophagus granulatus
- Onthophagus gulmarri
- Onthophagus hermonensis
- Onthophagus hirtus
- Onthophagus hoplocerus
- Onthophagus humpatensis
- Onthophagus impressicollis
- Onthophagus janthinus
- Onthophagus jugicola
- Onthophagus juvencus
- Onthophagus kavirondus
- Onthophagus lacustris
- Onthophagus laminatus
- Onthophagus latigena
- Onthophagus leanus
- Onthophagus lemekensis
- Onthophagus lugubris
- Onthophagus mamillatus
- Onthophagus manya
- Onthophagus melitaeus
- Onthophagus muelleri
- Onthophagus mundill
- Onthophagus muticus
- Onthophagus neostenocerus
- Onthophagus nigellus
- Onthophagus nigriventris
- Onthophagus obtusicornis
- Onthophagus onorei
- Onthophagus opacicollis
- Onthophagus panici
- Onthophagus parallelicornis
- Onthophagus parumnotatus
- Onthophagus petrovitzianus
- Onthophagus probus
- Onthophagus propinquus
- Onthophagus pugionatus
- Onthophagus punctatus
- Onthophagus punthari
- Onthophagus quadricuspis
- Onthophagus queenslandicus
- Onthophagus rufosignatus
- Onthophagus semimetallicus
- Onthophagus sericatus
- Onthophagus stigmosus
- Onthophagus stylocerus
- Onthophagus subocelliger
- Onthophagus tamworthi
- Onthophagus tenebrosus
- Onthophagus trapezicornis
- Onthophagus tweedensis
- Onthophagus victoriensis
- Onthophagus vigens
- Onthophagus weringerong
- Onthophagus xanthomerus
- Onthophagus yaran
- Onthophagus yungaburra
- Oxysternon macleayi
- Pachysoma denticollis
- Pachysoma fitzsimonsi
- Pachysoma gariepinus
- Pachysoma hippocrates
- Paracanthon trichonotulus
- Pedaria biseria
- Pedaria conformis
- Pedaria criberrima
- Pedaria decorsei
- Pedaria dentata
- Pedaria durandi
- Pedaria estellae
- Pedaria juhellegrandi
- Pedaria puncticollis
- Pedaria tenebrosa
- Phalacronothus putoni
- Phanaeus bispinus
- Phanaeus prasinus
- Phanaeus pyrois
- Phanaeus sororibispinus
- Plagiogonus esimoides
- Plagiogonus nanus
- Proagoderus atriclaviger
- Proagoderus bicallosus
- Proagoderus extensus
- Proagoderus quadrituber
- Proagoderus sapphirinus
- Pseudacrossus suffertus
- Sauvagesinella palustris
- Scarabaeus aegyptiorum
- Scarabaeus ambiguus
- Scarabaeus costatus
- Scarabaeus damarensis
- Scarabaeus deludens
- Scarabaeus difficilis
- Scarabaeus galenus
- Scarabaeus inoportunus
- Scarabaeus karrooensis
- Scarabaeus laevistriatus
- Scarabaeus namibicus
- Scarabaeus nigroaeneus
- Scarabaeus subaeneus
- Scatimus simulator
- Scatonomus viridis
- Scybalocanthon nigriceps
- Scybalocanthon sexspilotus
- Scybalocanthon trimaculatus
- Scybalophagus patagonicus
- Scybalophagus plicatipennis
- Scybalophagus rugosus
- Sisyphus caffer
- Sisyphus fasciculatus
- Sisyphus natalensis
- Sisyphus ocellatus
- Subrinus vitellinus
- Sulcophanaeus auricollis
- Sulcophanaeus batesi
- Sulcophanaeus imperator
- Sulcophanaeus miyashitai
- Sylvicanthon bridarollii
- Temnoplectron bornemisszai
- Temnoplectron boucomonti
- Temnoplectron cooki
- Temnoplectron disruptum
- Temnoplectron finnigani
- Temnoplectron rotundum
- Temnoplectron subvolitans
- Tomogonus crassus
- Trichillidium quadridens
- Uroxys coarctatus
- Uroxys dilaticollis
- Uroxys elongatus
- Uroxys variabilis
- Xinidium davisi

=== Other beetle species ===
- Allopentarthrum elumbe
- Dacne notata
- Dorcus musimon
- Dryotribus mimeticus
- Grynocharis oblonga
- Lucanus barbarossa
- Lucanus tetraodon
- Macrancylus linearis
- Platycerus spinifer
- Scobicia barbifrons
- Scobicia ficicola
- Tritoma bipustulata

== Odonata ==
Odonata includes dragonflies and damselflies. There are 1690 species and five subspecies in the order Odonata assessed as least concern.

=== Platystictids ===
- Drepanosticta anascephala
- Drepanosticta carmichaeli
- Palaemnema abbreviata
- Palaemnema brucelli
- Elongate shadowdamsel (Palaemnema gigantula)
- Palaemnema joanetta
- Palaemnema melanura
- Palaemnema nathalia
- Cordoba shadowdamsel (Palaemnema paulicoba)
- Palaemnema paulina
- Palaemnema paulitaba
- Palaemnema picicaudata
- Short-winged shadowdamsel (Protosticta beaumonti)
- Protosticta curiosa
- Protosticta davenporti
- Protosticta geijskesi
- Protosticta grandis
- Protosticta gravelyi
- Protosticta linnaei
- Protosticta medusa
- Protosticta rufostigma
- Protosticta taipokauensis
- Sinosticta debra
- Sinosticta ogatai

=== Chlorogomphids ===
- Chlorogomphus arooni
- Chlorogomphus campioni
- Chlorogomphus iriomotensis
- Chlorogomphus papilio
- Watanabeopetalia atkinsoni

=== Argiolestids ===
- Little flatwing (Argiolestes pusillus)
- Powdered flatwing (Austroargiolestes calcaris)
- Caledopteryx maculata
- Caledopteryx sarasini
- Neurolestes trinervis
- Podolestes orientalis
- Trineuragrion percostale

=== Perilestids ===
- Attenuate twigtail (Perilestes attenuatus)
- Perilestes kahli
- Perilestes solutus
- Perissolestes cornutus
- Perissolestes remotus

=== Chlorocyphids ===
- Blue jewel (Chlorocypha aphrodite)
- Exquisite jewel (Chlorocypha cancellata)
- Southern red jewel (Chlorocypha consueta)
- Blue-tipped jewel (Chlorocypha curta)
- Blue-fronted jewel (Chlorocypha cyanifrons)
- Orange-nosed jewel (Chlorocypha dahli)
- Little red jewel (Chlorocypha dispar)
- Spotted jewel (Chlorocypha fabamacula)
- Frigid jewel (Chlorocypha frigida)
- Eastern red-tipped jewel (Chlorocypha glauca)
- Orange jewel (Chlorocypha luminosa)
- River jewel (Chlorocypha pyriformosa)
- Western red-tipped jewel (Chlorocypha radix)
- Rosy jewel (Chlorocypha rubida)
- Blue-faced jewel (Chlorocypha selysi)
- Southern red-tipped jewel (Chlorocypha seydeli)
- Blue-nosed jewel (Chlorocypha trifaria)
- Victoria's jewel (Chlorocypha victoriae)
- Katanga jewel (Chlorocypha wittei)
- Cyrano unicolor
- Libellago aurantiaca
- Libellago hyalina
- Libellago lineata
- Libellago rufescens
- Libellago stigmatizans
- Dancing jewel (Platycypha caligata)
- Boulder jewel (Platycypha fitzsimonsi)
- Forest jewel (Platycypha lacustris)
- Beautiful jewel (Platycypha rufitibia)
- Rhinocypha arguta
- Rhinocypha biforata
- Rhinocypha bisignata
- Rhinocypha chaoi
- Rhinocypha drusilla
- Rhinocypha fenestrella
- Rhinocypha ignipennis
- Rhinocypha immaculata
- Rhinocypha iridea
- Rhinocypha pelops
- Common blue jewel (Rhinocypha perforata)
- Rhinocypha quadrimaculata
- Rhinocypha spuria
- Rhinocypha trifasciata
- Rhinocypha unimaculata
- Rhinocypha watsoni
- Graceful jewel (Stenocypha gracilis)
- Slender jewel (Stenocypha tenuis)

=== Platycnemidids ===
Species

- Red-backed yellowwing (Allocnemis contraria)
- Blue-tipped yellowwing (Allocnemis cyanura)
- Orange yellowwing (Allocnemis elongata)
- Dark yellowwing (Allocnemis flavipennis)
- Goldtail (Allocnemis leucosticta)
- Blue-shouldered threadtail (Allocnemis marshalli)
- Rainbow yellowwing (Allocnemis nigripes)
- Orange-tipped threadtail (Allocnemis pauli)
- Blue yellowwing (Allocnemis subnodalis)
- Allocnemis superba
- Allocnemis wittei
- Powder blue damselfly (Arabicnemis caerulea)
- Calicnemia chaseni
- Calicnemia doonensis
- Calicnemia erythromelas
- Calicnemia eximia
- Calicnemia imitans
- Calicnemia miles
- Calicnemia miniata
- Calicnemia mortoni
- Calicnemia pulverulans
- Calicnemia sinensis
- Coeliccia albicauda
- Coeliccia bimaculata
- Coeliccia chromothorax
- Coeliccia cyanomelas
- Coeliccia didyma
- Coeliccia doisuthepensis
- Coeliccia flavicauda
- Coeliccia kazukoae
- Coeliccia loogali
- Coeliccia poungyi
- Coeliccia renifera
- Coeliccia scutellum
- Coeliccia yamasakii
- Copera annulata
- Copera chantaburii
- Copera ciliata
- Congo featherleg (Copera congolensis)
- Copera guttifera
- Copera marginipes
- Eastern featherleg (Copera nyansana)
- Copera rufipes
- Little featherleg (Copera sikassoensis)
- Copera vittata
- Disparoneura quadrimaculata
- Eastern red threadtail (Elattoneura acuta)
- Elattoneura balli
- Elattoneura cellularis
- Elattoneura centrafricana
- Sooty threadtail (Elattoneura frenulata)
- Western red threadtail (Elattoneura girardi)
- Common threadtail (Elattoneura glauca)
- Elattoneura incerta
- Elattoneura josemorai
- Elattoneura lliba
- Elattoneura nigra
- Elattoneura pruinosa
- Elattoneura tetrica
- Orange-fronted threadtail (Elattoneura vittata)
- Elattoneura vrijdaghi
- Esme longistyla
- Idiocnemis bidentata
- Idiocnemis inaequidens
- Idioneura ancilla
- Indocnemis orang
- Mesocnemis robusta
- Common riverjack (Mesocnemis singularis)
- Green-blue threadtail (Nososticta coelestina)
- Nososticta erythrura
- Nososticta plagiata
- Fivespot threadtail (Nososticta solitaris)
- Paramecocnemis erythrostigma
- Orange featherleg (Platycnemis acutipennis)
- Ivory featherleg (Platycnemis dealbata)
- Kerville's featherleg (Platycnemis kervillei)
- White featherleg (Platycnemis latipes)
- White-legged damselfly (Platycnemis pennipes)
- Barbary featherleg (Platycnemis subdilatata)
- Prodasineura auricolor
- Prodasineura autumnalis
- Prodasineura coerulescens
- Prodasineura collaris
- Prodasineura croconota
- Prodasineura hosei
- Prodasineura laidlawii
- Prodasineura odzalae
- Prodasineura verticalis
- White-fronted threadtail (Prodasineura villiersi)
- Risiocnemis asahinai
- Risiocnemis atripes
- Risiocnemis atropurpurea
- Tricklejack (Stenocnemis pachystigma)

Subspecies

- Platycnemis pennipes nitidula

=== Synlestids ===
- Conspicuous malachite (Chlorolestes conspicuus)
- Drakensberg malachite (Chlorolestes draconicus)
- Mountain malachite (Chlorolestes fasciatus)
- Forest malachite (Chlorolestes tessellatus)
- White malachite (Chlorolestes umbratus)
- Megalestes distans
- Megalestes haui
- Megalestes heros
- Megalestes kurahashii
- Megalestes major
- Megalestes micans
- Sinolestes editus

=== Megapodagrionids ===
- Agriomorpha fusca
- Allopodagrion contortum
- Archaeopodagrion armatum
- Archaeopodagrion bicorne
- Burmargiolestes melanothorax
- Dimeragrion percubitale
- Heteragrion aequatoriale
- Heteragrion aurantiacum
- Heteragrion bickorum
- Heteragrion cooki
- Heteragrion erythrogastrum
- Heteragrion majus
- Heteragrion makiritare
- Highland flatwing (Heteragrion tricellulare)
- Heteropodagrion croizati
- Heteropodagrion sanguinipes
- Mesagrion leucorrhinum
- Mesopodagrion tibetanum
- Oxystigma petiolatum
- Oxystigma williamsoni
- Paraphlebia quinta
- Philogenia boliviana
- Philogenia buenavista
- Philogenia cassandra
- Philogenia championi
- Philogenia elisabeta
- Philogenia leonora
- Philogenia macuma
- Philogenia mangosisa
- Philogenia minteri
- Philogenia peacocki
- Philogenia redunca
- Philogenia silvarum
- Rhinagrion hainanense
- Rhinagrion mima
- Rhinagrion philippina
- Rhinagrion viridatum
- Rhipidolestes asatoi
- Rhipidolestes cyanoflavus
- Rhipidolestes janetae
- Rhipidolestes owadai
- Tatocnemis malgassica
- Teinopodagrion angulatum
- Teinopodagrion caquetanum
- Teinopodagrion chinchaysuyum
- Teinopodagrion croizati
- Teinopodagrion curtum
- Teinopodagrion decipiens
- Teinopodagrion depressum
- Teinopodagrion eretes
- Teinopodagrion mercenarium
- Teinopodagrion meridionale
- Teinopodagrion nebulosum
- Teinopodagrion schiessi
- Teinopodagrion setigerum
- Teinopodagrion yunka
- Giant waterfall damsel (Thaumatoneura inopinata)

=== Gomphids ===
- Amphigomphus hansoni
- Amphigomphus nakamurai
- Anisogomphus anderi
- Anisogomphus bivittatus
- Anisogomphus koxingai
- Anisogomphus maacki
- Anisogomphus occipitalis
- Anormogomphus heteropterus
- Southern dragon (Antipodogomphus acolythus)
- Aphylla boliviana
- Aphylla brasiliensis
- Aphylla brevipes
- Narrow-striped forceptail (Aphylla protracta)
- Aphylla tenuis
- Aphylla theodorina
- Two-striped forceptail (Aphylla williamsoni)
- Archaeogomphus hamatus
- Asiagomphus acco
- Asiagomphus pacificus
- Asiagomphus septimus
- Pale hunter (Austrogomphus amphiclitus)
- Jade hunter (Austrogomphus ochraceus)
- Burmagomphus divaricatus
- Burmagomphus intinctus
- Burmagomphus pyramidalis
- Burmagomphus sivalikensis
- Burmagomphus sowerbyi
- Burmagomphus vermicularis
- Burmagomphus williamsoni
- Common thorntail (Ceratogomphus pictus)
- Horned talontail (Crenigomphus cornutus)
- Clubbed talontail (Crenigomphus hartmanni)
- Kavango talontail (Crenigomphus kavangoensis)
- Western talontail (Crenigomphus renei)
- Cyanogomphus waltheri
- Davidius aberrans
- Davidius davidii
- Davidius fruhstorferi
- Davidius nanus
- Desmogomphus paucinervis
- Diaphlebia angustipennis
- Diastatomma bicolor
- Diastatomma gamblesi
- Diastatomma multilineatum
- Diastatomma selysi
- Diastatomma soror
- Diastatomma tricolor
- Southeastern spinyleg (Dromogomphus armatus)
- Black-shouldered spinyleg (Dromogomphus spinosus)
- Volcano knobtail (Epigomphus echeverrii)
- Epigomphus paludosus
- Epigomphus quadracies
- One-striped ringtail (Erpetogomphus bothrops)
- Knob-tipped ringtail (Erpetogomphus constrictor)
- Yellow-legged ringtail (Erpetogomphus crotalinus)
- Serpent ringtail (Erpetogomphus lampropeltis)
- Dark-shouldered ringtail (Erpetogomphus liopeltis)
- Erpetogomphus sabaleticus
- Erpetogomphus sipedon
- Erpetogomphus tristani
- Erpetogomphus viperinus
- Hong Kong tusktail (Fukienogomphus choifongae)
- Fukienogomphus prometheus
- Fukienogomphus promineus
- Gomphidia abbotti
- Northern fingertail (Gomphidia bredoi)
- Gomphidia confluens
- Gomphidia gamblesi
- Gomphidia kruegeri
- Gomphidia maclachlani
- Southern fingertail (Gomphidia quarrei)
- Gomphidia t-nigrum
- Gomphidictinus perakensis
- Spine-crowned clubtail (Gomphus abbreviatus)
- Levant clubtail (Gomphus davidi)
- Blackwater clubtail (Gomphus dilatatus)
- Lancet clubtail (Gomphus exilis)
- River clubtail (Gomphus flavipes)
- Splendid clubtail (Gomphus lineatifrons)
- Gulf coast clubtail (Gomphus modestus)
- Ozark clubtail (Gomphus ozarkensis)
- Piedmont clubtail (Gomphus parvidens)
- Western clubtail (Gomphus pulchellus)
- Turkish clubtail (Gomphus schneiderii)
- Septima's clubtail (Gomphus septima)
- Common clubtail (Gomphus vulgatissimus)
- Dragonhunter (Hagenius brevistylus)
- Heliogomphus bakeri
- Heliogomphus retroflexus
- Heliogomphus scorpio
- Heliogomphus selysi
- Rainforest vicetail (Hemigomphus theischingeri)
- Ictinogomphus angulosus
- Ictinogomphus decoratus
- Swamp tigertail (Ictinogomphus dundoensis)
- Common tiger (Ictinogomphus ferox)
- Ictinogomphus fraseri
- Ictinogomphus pertinax
- Ictinogomphus rapax
- Ictinogomphus regisalberti
- Ictinogomphus tenax
- Isomma hieroglyphicum
- Labrogomphus torvus
- Lamelligomphus biforceps
- Lamelligomphus camelus
- Lamelligomphus hainanensis
- Lamelligomphus ringens
- Leptogomphus celebratus
- Leptogomphus coomansi
- Leptogomphus divaricatus
- Leptogomphus gestroi
- Leptogomphus perforatus
- Leptogomphus risi
- Leptogomphus yayeyamensis
- Spined fairytail (Lestinogomphus angustus)
- Lestinogomphus congoensis
- Lestinogomphus matilei
- Large horntail (Libyogomphus tenaculatus)
- Bladetail (Lindenia tetraphylla)
- Macrogomphus parallelogramma
- Mastigogomphus chapini
- Mastigogomphus dissimilis
- Megalogomphus sommeri
- Megalogomphus sumatranus
- Melanocacus mungo
- Melligomphus ardens
- Merogomphus parvus
- Merogomphus pavici
- Microgomphus camerunensis
- Microgomphus chelifer
- Microgomphus jannyae
- Microgomphus nyassicus
- Congo scissortail (Microgomphus schoutedeni)
- Microgomphus souteri
- Microgomphus thailandica
- Neogomphus bidens
- Nepogomphus modestus
- Nepogomphus walli
- Neurogomphus alius
- Striped siphontail (Neurogomphus featheri)
- Neurogomphus fuscifrons
- Neurogomphus martininus
- Neurogomphus uelensis
- Neurogomphus wittei
- Zambezi siphontail (Neurogomphus zambeziensis)
- Nihonogomphus cultratus
- Nihonogomphus ruptus
- Nihonogomphus thomassoni
- Nihonogomphus viridis
- Notogomphus dendrohyrax
- Little longleg (Notogomphus dorsalis)
- Notogomphus kilimandjaricus
- Northern longleg (Notogomphus lecythus)
- Clubbed longleg (Notogomphus leroyi)
- Albertine longleg (Notogomphus lujai)
- Notogomphus moorei
- Southern yellowjack (Notogomphus praetorius)
- Notogomphus spinosus
- Notogomphus zernyi
- Nychogomphus duaricus
- Grappletail (Octogomphus specularis)
- Green-eyed hooktail (Onychogomphus forcipatus)
- Pale pincertail (Onychogomphus lefebvrii)
- Onychogomphus nilgiriensis
- Onychogomphus schmidti
- Onychogomphus seydeli
- Northern dark claspertail (Onychogomphus styx)
- Gorge claspertail (Onychogomphus supinus)
- Extra-striped snaketail (Ophiogomphus anomalus)
- Arizona snaketail (Ophiogomphus arizonicus)
- Brook snaketail (Ophiogomphus aspersus)
- Bison snaketail (Ophiogomphus bison)
- Green gomphid (Ophiogomphus cecilia)
- Boreal snaketail (Ophiogomphus colubrinus)
- Pygmy snaketail (Ophiogomphus howei)
- Sinuous snaketail (Ophiogomphus occidentis)
- Ophiogomphus reductus
- Saint Croix snaketail (Ophiogomphus susbehcha)
- Orientogomphus minor
- Paragomphus abnormis
- Paragomphus acuminatus
- Highland hooktail (Paragomphus alluaudi)
- Paragomphus bredoi
- Paragomphus capitatus
- Paragomphus capricornis
- Rock hocktail (Paragomphus cognatus)
- Corkscrew hooktail (Paragomphus elpidius)
- Common hooktail (Paragomphus genei)
- Paragomphus lacustris
- Lined hooktail (Paragomphus lineatus)
- Great hooktail (Paragomphus magnus)
- Paragomphus nigroviridis
- Paragomphus nyasicus
- Paragomphus pardalinus
- Small hooktail (Paragomphus pumilio)
- Flapper hooktail (Paragomphus sabicus)
- Paragomphus serrulatus
- Green-fronted hooktail (Paragomphus viridior)
- Perissogomphus stevensi
- Peruviogomphus moyobambus
- Peruviogomphus pearsoni
- Phaenandrogomphus asthenes
- Phaenandrogomphus tonkinicus
- Phyllocycla basidenta
- Phyllocycla breviphylla
- Phyllocycla hespera
- Phyllocycla titschacki
- Phyllocycla viridipleuris
- Phyllocycla volsella
- Phyllogomphoides andromeda
- Phyllogomphoides angularis
- Phyllogomphoides annectens
- Phyllogomphoides apiculatus
- Phyllogomphoides cepheus
- Phyllogomphoides duodentatus
- Phyllogomphoides lieftincki
- Phyllogomphoides nayaritensis
- Four-striped leaftail (Phyllogomphoides stigmatus)
- Phyllogomphus aethiops
- Phyllogomphus annulus
- Phyllogomphus coloratus
- Phyllogomphus moundi
- Phyllogomphus pseudoccidentalis
- Crowned leaftail (Phyllogomphus schoutedeni)
- Bold leaftail (Phyllogomphus selysi)
- Platygomphus dolabratus
- Bolivian sanddragon (Progomphus boliviensis)
- Progomphus brachycnemis
- Progomphus complicatus
- Progomphus costalis
- Progomphus herrerae
- Progomphus incurvatus
- Progomphus intricatus
- Progomphus mexicanus
- Progomphus montanus
- Progomphus phyllochromus
- Progomphus pijpersi
- Progomphus pygmaeus
- Scalmogomphus bistrigatus
- Sieboldius deflexus
- Sieboldius japponicus
- Golden flangetail (Sinictinogomphus clavatus)
- Stylogomphus chunliuae
- Stylogomphus inglisi
- Stylogomphus suzukii
- Riverine clubtail (Stylurus amnicola)
- Stylurus clathratus
- Shining clubtail (Stylurus ivae)
- Stylurus nanningensis
- Russet-tipped clubtail (Stylurus plagiatus)
- Zebra clubtail (Stylurus scudderi)
- Arrow clubtail (Stylurus spiniceps)
- Tibiagomphus uncatus
- Tragogomphus aurivillii
- Trigomphus beatus
- Trigomphus citimus

=== Cordulegastrids ===
- Anotogaster gregoryi
- Anotogaster nipalensis
- Cordulegaster brevistigma
- Apache spiketail (Cordulegaster diadema)
- Blue-eyed goldenring (Cordulegaster insignis)
- Cordulegaster mzymtae
- Arrowhead spiketail (Cordulegaster obliqua)
- Turkish goldenring (Cordulegaster picta)
- Ouachita spiketail (Cordulegaster talaria)
- Neallogaster hermionae
- Neallogaster latifrons
- Sinorogomphus nasutus
- Sinorogomphus tunti

=== Corduliids ===
- Dusk dragonfly (Antipodochlora braueri)
- Downy emerald (Cordulia aenea)
- Epitheca marginata
- Uhler's sundragon (Helocordulia uhleri)
- African emerald (Hemicordulia africana)
- Hemicordulia asiatica
- Australian emerald (Hemicordulia australiae)
- Fat-bellied emerald (Hemicordulia continentalis)
- Hemicordulia fidelis
- Hemicordulia intermedia
- Hemicordulia lulico
- Hemicordulia okinawensis
- Hemicordulia similis
- Hemicordulia tenera
- Heteronaias heterodoxa
- Offshore emerald (Metaphya tillyardi)
- Alabama shadowdragon (Neurocordulia alabamensis)
- Umber shadowdragon (Neurocordulia obsoleta)
- Cinnamon shadowdragon (Neurocordulia virginiensis)
- Western swamp emerald (Procordulia affinis)
- Yellow spotted dragonfly (Procordulia grayi)
- Eastern swamp emerald (Procordulia jacksoniensis)
- Ranger dragonfly (Procordulia smithii)
- Quebec emerald (Somatochlora brevicincta)
- Lake emerald (Somatochlora cingulata)
- Somatochlora dido
- Somatochlora flavomaculata
- Delicate emerald (Somatochlora franklini)
- Hudsonian emerald (Somatochlora hudsonica)
- Incurvate emerald (Somatochlora incurvata)
- Balkan emerald (Somatochlora meridionalis)
- Brilliant emerald (Somatochlora metallica)
- Beaverpond baskettail (Tetragoneuria canis)
- Florida baskettail (Tetragoneuria stella)

=== Calopterygids ===
- Archineura hetaerinoides
- Archineura incarnata
- Caliphaea confusa
- Caliphaea nitens
- River jewelwing (Calopteryx aequabilis)
- Appalachian jewelwing (Calopteryx angustipennis)
- Calopteryx atrata
- Calopteryx cornelia
- Copper demoiselle (Calopteryx haemorrhoidalis)
- Calopteryx melli
- Calopteryx orientalis
- Banded demoiselle (Calopteryx splendens)
- Beautiful demoiselle (Calopteryx virgo)
- Western demoiselle (Calopteryx xanthostoma)
- Echo margarita
- Echo modesta
- Echo uniformis
- Hetaerina aurora
- Hook-tipped rubyspot (Hetaerina curvicauda)
- Hetaerina duplex
- Hetaerina flavipennis
- Hetaerina hebe
- Hetaerina infecta
- Hetaerina majuscula
- Hetaerina sempronia
- Canyon rubyspot (Hetaerina vulnerata)
- Tepui shinywing (Iridictyon myersi)
- White-banded shinywing (Iridictyon trebbaui)
- Matrona basilaris
- Mnais andersoni
- Mnais gregoryi
- Mnais mneme
- Mnais pruinosa
- Mnais yunosukei
- Mnesarete devillei
- Mnesarete drepane
- Mnesarete ephippium
- Mnesarete guttifera
- Neurobasis anumariae
- Neurobasis chinensis
- Neurobasis kimminsi
- Neurobasis longipes
- Ormenophlebia imperatrix
- Ormenophlebia regina
- Ormenophlebia saltuum
- Forest flashwing (Phaon camerunensis)
- Glistening demoiselle (Phaon iridipennis)
- Spring bluewing (Sapho bicolor)
- Western bluewing (Sapho ciliata)
- Glorious bluewing (Sapho gloriosa)
- Eastern bluewing (Sapho orichalcea)
- Broad-winged sparklewing (Umma cincta)
- Metallic sparklewing (Umma electa)
- Bare-bellied sparklewing (Umma longistigma)
- Hairy-bellied sparklewing (Umma mesostigma)
- Sapphire sparklewing (Umma saphirina)
- Vestalaria miao
- Vestalaria smaragdina
- Vestalaria velata
- Vestalaria vinnula
- Vestalis amethystina
- Vestalis amoena
- Vestalis anne
- Vestalis apicalis
- Vestalis atropha
- Vestalis gracilis
- Vestalis venusta

=== Coenagrionids ===
Species

- Acanthagrion ablutum
- Acanthagrion adustum
- Acanthagrion chacoense
- Acanthagrion cuyabae
- Acanthagrion inexpectum
- Acanthagrion kennedii
- Acanthagrion longispinosum
- Acanthagrion obsoletum
- Acanthagrion peruanum
- Acanthagrion peruvianum
- Acanthagrion speculum
- Acanthagrion tepuiense
- Acanthagrion truncatum
- Acanthagrion yungarum
- Blue slim (Aciagrion africanum)
- Aciagrion approximans
- Aciagrion azureum
- Aciagrion borneense
- Aciagrion fragile
- Graceful slim (Aciagrion gracile)
- Long slim (Aciagrion heterosticta)
- Aciagrion hisopa
- Aciagrion migratum
- Aciagrion occidentale
- Aciagrion olympicum
- Aciagrion pallidum
- Swamp slim (Aciagrion steeleae)
- Aciagrion tillyardi
- Aeolagrion axine
- Elongate bluet (Africallagma elongatum)
- Africallagma glaucum
- Africallagma pallidulum
- Spotted bluet (Africallagma pseudelongatum)
- Sapphire bluet (Africallagma sapphirinum)
- Peak bluet (Africallagma sinuatum)
- Fragile bluet (Africallagma subtile)
- Forest bluet (Africallagma vaginale)
- Blue wisp (Agriocnemis angolensis)
- Agriocnemis clauseni
- Agriocnemis dabreui
- Little wisp (Agriocnemis exilis)
- White-masked wisp (Agriocnemis falcifera)
- Agriocnemis femina
- Forceps wisp (Agriocnemis forcipata)
- Gracious wisp (Agriocnemis gratiosa)
- Highland wisp (Agriocnemis inversa)
- Agriocnemis keralensis
- Agriocnemis lacteola
- Forest wisp (Agriocnemis maclachlani)
- Agriocnemis minima
- Agriocnemis nana
- Agriocnemis pieris
- Pinhey's wisp (Agriocnemis pinheyi)
- Wandering midget (Agriocnemis pygmaea)
- Orange wisp (Agriocnemis ruberrima)
- Nile wisp (Agriocnemis sania)
- Agriocnemis splendissima
- Congo wisp (Agriocnemis stygia)
- Lesser pincer-tailed wisp (Agriocnemis victoria)
- Sahel wisp (Agriocnemis zerafica)
- Amazoneura westfalli
- Eastern red damsel (Amphiagrion saucium)
- Amphiallagma parvum
- Amphicnemis martini
- Anisagrion allopterum
- Anisagrion inornatum
- Antiagrion gayi
- Antiagrion grinbergsi
- Archibasis crucigera
- Archibasis oscillans
- Archibasis viola
- Paiute dancer (Argia alberta)
- Blue-fronted dancer (Argia apicalis)
- Argia croceipennis
- Argia dives
- Argia frequentula
- Argia garrisoni
- Argia gerhardi
- Argia hamulata
- Huanacina dancer (Argia huanacina)
- Argia inculta
- Argia infrequentula
- Argia kokama
- Leonora's dancer (Argia leonorae)
- Argia limitata
- Sooty dancer (Argia lugens)
- Powdered dancer (Argia moesta)
- Argia nigrior
- Amethyst dancer (Argia pallens)
- Springwater dancer (Argia plana)
- Argia pocomana
- Argia popoluca
- Golden-winged dancer (Argia rhoadsi)
- Tarascan dancer (Argia tarascana)
- Blue-tipped dancer (Argia tibialis)
- Argia underwoodi
- Argia variata
- Westfall (Argia westfalli)
- Argia yungensis
- Red-tipped shadefly (Argiocnemis rubescens)
- Austroagrion exclamationis
- Austrocoenagrion lyelli
- Sailing azuret (Azuragrion nigridorsum)
- Somali azuret (Azuragrion somalicum)
- Tiny azuret (Azuragrion vansomereni)
- Cercion malayanum
- Ceriagrion aeruginosum
- Green-eyed waxtail (Ceriagrion annulatum)
- Orange-tailed sprite (Ceriagrion auranticum)
- Ceriagrion azureum
- Blue-fronted waxtail (Ceriagrion bakeri)
- Ceriagrion bellona
- Ceriagrion calamineum
- Ceriagrion cerinorubellum
- Ceriagrion chaoi
- Green-fronted waxtail (Ceriagrion corallinum)
- Ceriagrion coromandelianum
- Ceriagrion fallax
- Common waxtail (Ceriagrion glabrum)
- Little red waxtail (Ceriagrion ignitum)
- Ceriagrion indochinense
- Little orange waxtail (Ceriagrion kordofanicum)
- Ceriagrion malaisei
- Ceriagrion melanurum
- East coast waxtail (Ceriagrion mourae)
- Ceriagrion olivaceum
- Ceriagrion praetermissum
- Red-tipped waxtail (Ceriagrion rubellocerinum)
- Cream-sided waxtail (Ceriagrion sakejii)
- Plain waxtail (Ceriagrion suave)
- Fiery waxtail (Ceriagrion tricrenaticeps)
- Orange-red waxtail (Ceriagrion varians)
- Yellow-faced waxtail (Ceriagrion whellani)
- Norfolk damselfly (Coenagrion armatum)
- Mediterranean bluet (Coenagrion caerulescens)
- Spearhead bluet (Coenagrion hastulatum)
- Ornate bluet (Coenagrion ornatum)
- Coenagrion ponticum
- Azure damselfly (Coenagrion puella)
- Variable damselfly (Coenagrion pulchellum)
- Taiga bluet (Coenagrion resolutum)
- Dainty damselfly (Coenagrion scitulum)
- Coenagrion terue
- Cyanallagma bonariense
- Cyanallagma interruptum
- Denticulobasis dunklei
- Drepanoneura flinti
- Drepanoneura loutoni
- Drepanoneura muzoni
- Drepanoneura peruviensis
- Drepanoneura tennesseni
- Tule bluet (Enallagma carunculatum)
- Enallagma circulatum
- Common blue damselfly (Enallagma cyathigerum)
- Sandhill bluet (Enallagma davisi)
- Desert bluet (Enallagma deserti)
- Atlantic bluet (Enallagma doubledayi)
- Burgundy bluet (Enallagma dubium)
- Marsh bluet (Enallagma ebrium)
- Stream bluet (Enallagma exsulans)
- New England bluet (Enallagma laterale)
- Enallagma minusculum
- Slender bluet (Enallagma traviatum)
- Epipleoneura capilliformis
- Epipleoneura fuscaenea
- Epipleoneura kaxuriana
- Epipleoneura lamina
- Epipleoneura manauensis
- Epipleoneura metallica
- Epipleoneura williamsoni
- Epipotoneura nehalennia
- Goblet-marked damselfly (Erythromma lindenii)
- Small red-eyed damselfly (Erythromma viridulum)
- Helveciagrion obsoletum
- Helveciagrion simulacrum
- Painted damsel (Hesperagrion heterodoxum)
- Homeoura ambigua
- Ischnura acuticauda
- Gossamer damselfly (Ischnura aurora)
- Ischnura chingaza
- Ischnura cruzi
- Ischnura cyane
- Blue-tailed damselfly (Ischnura elegans)
- Desert bluetail (Ischnura evansi)
- Ischnura fluviatilis
- Ischnura forcipata
- Oasis bluetail (Ischnura fountaineae)
- Island bluetail (Ischnura genei)
- Iberian bluetail (Ischnura graellsii)
- Western forktail (Ischnura perparva)
- Fragile forktail (Ischnura posita)
- Scarce blue-tailed damselfly (Ischnura pumilio)
- Rambur's forktail (Ischnura ramburii)
- Ischnura rufostigma
- Sahara bluetail (Ischnura saharensis)
- Tropical bluetail (Ischnura senegalensis)
- Leptagrion macrurum
- Leptagrion perlongum
- Caribbean swampdamsel (Leptobasis candelaria)
- Leptobasis inversa
- Lucifer swampdamsel (Leptobasis lucifer)
- Leptobasis mauffrayi
- Red-tipped swampdamsel (Leptobasis vacillans)
- Blue-tipped helicopter (Mecistogaster buckleyi)
- Ornate helicopter (Mecistogaster ornata)
- Adytum swamp damselfly (Megalagrion adytum)
- Koele mountain damselfly (Megalagrion koelense)
- Mesamphiagrion occultum
- Mesamphiagrion risi
- Mesoleptobasis incus
- Metaleptobasis foreli
- Metaleptobasis furcifera
- Metaleptobasis knopfi
- Metaleptobasis mauffrayi
- Metaleptobasis prostrata
- Metaleptobasis westfalli
- Minagrion mecistogastrum
- Minagrion waltheri
- Mortonagrion aborense
- Mortonagrion falcatum
- Sphagnum sprite (Nehalennia gracilis)
- Neoerythromma gladiolatum
- Amelia's threadtail (Neoneura amelia)
- Neoneura bilinearis
- Neoneura desana
- Neoneura fulvicollis
- Onychargia atrocyana
- Oreiallagma acutum
- Oreiallagma oreas
- Oreiallagma quadricolor
- Oxyagrion bruchi
- Oxyagrion impunctatum
- Oxyagrion miniopsis
- Oxyagrion sulinum
- Oxyagrion tennesseni
- Oxyallagma colombianum
- Palaiargia humida
- Dusky lilysquatter (Paracercion calamorum)
- Paracercion dorothea
- Eastern lilysquatter (Paracercion melanotum)
- Paracercion v-nigrum
- Pericnemis stictica
- Phoenicagrion paulsoni
- Angola bluet (Pinheyagrion angolicum)
- Round-winged bluet (Proischnura rotundipennis)
- Fork-tailed bluet (Proischnura subfurcata)
- Protoneura amatoria
- Protoneura aurantiaca
- Protoneura calverti
- Protoneura cupida
- Purple threadtail (Protoneura dunklei)
- Red-legged threadtail (Protoneura sanguinipes)
- Sulphury threadtail (Protoneura sulfurata)
- Scarlet-backed threadtail (Protoneura tenuis)
- Acacia sprite (Pseudagrion acaciae)
- Pseudagrion aguessei
- Assegaai sprite (Pseudagrion assegaii)
- Pseudagrion australasiae
- Pseudagrion bernardi
- Springwater sprite (Pseudagrion caffrum)
- Orange-faced sprite (Pseudagrion camerunense)
- Yellow-faced sprite (Pseudagrion citricola)
- Catshead sprite (Pseudagrion coelestis)
- Black sprite (Pseudagrion commoniae)
- Pseudagrion cyathiforme
- Pseudagrion decorum
- Dening's sprite (Pseudagrion deningi)
- Pseudagrion divaricatum
- Mountain sprite (Pseudagrion draconis)
- Blue-faced sprite (Pseudagrion emarginatum)
- Pseudagrion epiphonematicum
- Fisher's sprite (Pseudagrion fisheri)
- Palmiet sprite (Pseudagrion furcigerum)
- Great sprite (Pseudagrion gamblesi)
- Pseudagrion gigas
- Blue-green sprite (Pseudagrion glaucescens)
- Cryptic sprite (Pseudagrion glaucoideum)
- Slender sprite (Pseudagrion glaucum)
- Pseudagrion greeni
- Painted sprite (Pseudagrion hageni)
- Swarthy sprite (Pseudagrion hamoni)
- Helena sprite (Pseudagrion helenae)
- Yellow-legged sprite (Pseudagrion hemicolon)
- Pseudagrion hypermelas
- Flame-headed riverdamsel (Pseudagrion ignifer)
- Inconspicuous sprite (Pseudagrion inconspicuum)
- Powder-faced sprite (Pseudagrion kersteni)
- Forest sprite (Pseudagrion kibalense)
- Pseudagrion laidlawi
- Pseudagrion lalakense
- Pseudagrion lindicum
- Green-striped sprite (Pseudagrion makabusiense)
- Pseudagrion malabaricum
- Pseudagrion malagasoides
- Masai sprite (Pseudagrion massaicum)
- Farmbush sprite (Pseudagrion melanicterum)
- Blue riverdamsel (Pseudagrion microcephalum)
- Nile sprite (Pseudagrion niloticum)
- Bluetail sprite (Pseudagrion nubicum)
- Pseudagrion pruinosum
- Cameroon sprite (Pseudagrion risi)
- Pseudagrion rubriceps
- Albertine sprite (Pseudagrion rufocinctum)
- Dark sprite (Pseudagrion rufostigma)
- Slate sprite (Pseudagrion salisburyense)
- Pseudagrion serrulatum
- Pseudagrion simonae
- Pseudagrion simplicilaminatum
- Variable sprite (Pseudagrion sjoestedti)
- Pseudagrion spencei
- Upland sprite (Pseudagrion spernatum)
- Cherry-eye sprite (Pseudagrion sublacteum)
- Blue-sided sprite (Pseudagrion sudanicum)
- Pseudagrion superbum
- Syrian sprite (Pseudagrion syriacum)
- Orange slimsprite (Pseudagrion thenartum)
- Wing-tailed sprite (Pseudagrion torridum)
- Vaal sprite (Pseudagrion vaalense)
- Pseudagrion williamsoni
- Large red damselfly (Pyrrhosoma nymphula)
- Rhodischnura nursei
- Schistolobos boliviensis
- Teinobasis ariel
- Teinobasis filamentum
- Teinobasis rajah
- Teinobasis samaritis
- Teinobasis superba
- Telebasis brevis
- Telebasis carmesina
- Telebasis corallina
- Telebasis demararum
- Marsh firetail (Telebasis digiticollis)
- Telebasis garleppi
- Telebasis griffinii
- Oasis firetail (Telebasis incolumis)
- Telebasis limoncocha
- Telebasis livida
- Telebasis milleri
- Selva firetail (Telebasis racenisi)
- Red-and-blue firetail (Telebasis rubricauda)
- Forcipate firetail (Telebasis versicolor)
- Telebasis willinki
- Tuberculobasis cardinalis
- Alpine redcoat damselfly (Xanthocnemis sinclairi)
- Chatham redcoat damselfly (Xanthocnemis tuanuii)
- Common redcoat damselfly (Xanthocnemis zealandica)
- Exclamation damsel (Zoniagrion exclamationis)

Subspecies

- Pele damselfly (Megalagrion amaurodytum peles)

=== Euphaeids ===
- Anisopleura comes
- Anisopleura furcata
- Anisopleura lestoides
- Anisopleura qingyuanensis
- Anisopleura subplatystyla
- Bayadera bidentata
- Bayadera continentalis
- Bayadera indica
- Bayadera melanopteryx
- Cryptophaea vietnamensis
- Dysphaea basitincta
- Dysphaea dimidiata
- Dysphaea gloriosa
- Dysphaea lugens
- Odalisque (Epallage fatime)
- Euphaea amphicyana
- Euphaea aspasia
- Euphaea bocki
- Euphaea cardinalis
- Euphaea decorata
- Euphaea dispar
- Euphaea formosa
- Euphaea fraseri
- Euphaea guerini
- Euphaea impar
- Euphaea masoni
- Euphaea ochracea
- Euphaea subcostalis
- Euphaea superba

=== Synthemistids ===
- Twinspot tigertail (Archaeosynthemis leachii)
- Variable tigertail (Eusynthemis aurolineata)
- Mountain tigertail (Eusynthemis tillyardi)
- Royal tigertail (Parasynthemis regina)
- Synthemis campioni
- Synthemis miranda
- Synthemis primigenia

=== Macromiids ===
- Regal pond cruiser (Epophthalmia elegans)
- Epophthalmia frontalis
- Epophthalmia vittata
- Epophthalmia vittigera
- Macromia amphigena
- Macromia annaimallaiensis
- Bronzed river cruiser (Macromia annulata)
- Macromia arachnomima
- Macromia bellicosa
- Macromia berlandi
- Macromia calliope
- Macromia chaiyaphumensis
- Macromia cingulata
- Macromia clio
- Macromia cupricincta
- Macromia cydippe
- Macromia ellisoni
- Macromia euterpe
- Macromia flavocolorata
- Macromia ida
- Macromia irata
- Macromia malleifera
- Macromia manchurica
- Macromia moorei
- Macromia pinratani
- Macromia unca
- Club-tailed cruiser (Macromia urania)
- Macromia westwoodii
- Phyllomacromia aeneothorax
- Phyllomacromia aequatorialis
- Sahel cruiser (Phyllomacromia africana)
- Phyllomacromia amicorum
- Golden-banded cruiser (Phyllomacromia aureozona)
- Phyllomacromia bicristulata
- Phyllomacromia bispina
- Phyllomacromia caneri
- Phyllomacromia congolica
- Two-banded cruiser (Phyllomacromia contumax)
- Phyllomacromia flavimitella
- Phyllomacromia gamblesi
- Phyllomacromia hervei
- Phyllomacromia insignis
- Crescent-faced cruiser (Phyllomacromia kimminsi)
- Phyllomacromia maesi
- Sombre cruiser (Phyllomacromia melania)
- Black cruiser (Phyllomacromia monoceros)
- Clubbed cruiser (Phyllomacromia overlaeti)
- Phyllomacromia pallidinervis
- Phyllomacromia paula
- Darting cruiser (Phyllomacromia picta)
- Western savanna cruiser (Phyllomacromia pseudafricana)
- Phyllomacromia schoutedeni
- Phyllomacromia seydeli
- Phyllomacromia sophia
- Forest cruiser (Phyllomacromia sylvatica)
- Phyllomacromia unifasciata

=== Lestids ===
- Blue damselfly (Austrolestes colensonis)
- Eastern willow spreadwing (Chalcolestes parvidens)
- Green emerald damselfly (Chalcolestes viridis)
- Indolestes cyaneus
- Indolestes gracilis
- Indolestes peregrinus
- Yellow-winged spreadwing (Lestes amicus)
- Lestes auritus
- Southern emerald damselfly (Lestes barbarus)
- Dusky spreadwing (Lestes concinnus)
- Lestes curvatus
- Lestes dichrostigma
- Cryptic spreadwing (Lestes dissimulans)
- Lestes dorothea
- Scarce emerald damselfly (Lestes dryas)
- Lestes elatus
- Lestes helix
- Lestes henshawi
- Tawny spreadwing (Lestes ictericus)
- Dark spreadwing (Lestes macrostigma)
- Lestes nodalis
- Ochre spreadwing (Lestes ochraceus)
- Pallid spreadwing (Lestes pallidus)
- Lestes paulistus
- Pinhey's spreadwing (Lestes pinheyi)
- Highland spreadwing (Lestes plagiatus)
- Lestes praemorsus
- Lestes quercifolia
- Common spreadwing (Lestes sponsa)
- Antillean spreadwing (Lestes spumarius)
- Lestes thoracicus
- Lestes tikalus
- Spotted spreadwing (Lestes tridens)
- Sickle spreadwing (Lestes uncifer)
- Lestes undulatus
- Small emerald spreadwing (Lestes virens)
- Smoky spreadwing (Lestes virgatus)
- Lestes viridulus
- Orolestes octomaculatus
- Orolestes selysi
- Orolestes wallacei
- Platylestes platystylus
- Common winter damsel (Sympecma fusca)
- Siberian winter damsel (Sympecma paedisca)

=== Aeshnids ===
- Aeschnophlebia longistigma
- Blue-eyed hawker (Aeshna affinis)
- Lancer dragonfly (Aeshna brevistyla)
- Azure hawker (Aeshna caerulea)
- Canada darner (Aeshna canadensis)
- Mottled darner (Aeshna clepsydra)
- Aeshna crenata
- Southern hawker (Aeshna cyanea)
- Brown hawker (Aeshna grandis)
- Green-eyed hawker (Aeshna isoceles)
- Common hawker (Aeshna juncea)
- Migrant hawker (Aeshna mixta)
- Aeshna ossiliensis
- Paddle-tailed darner (Aeshna palmata)
- Persephone's darner (Aeshna persephone)
- Aeshna petalura
- Baltic hawker (Aeshna serrata)
- Shadow darner (Aeshna umbrosa)
- Green hawker (Aeshna viridis)
- Shadow hawker (Afroaeschna scotias)
- Anaciaeschna donaldi
- Anaciaeschna jaspidea
- Anaciaeschna martini
- Evening hawker (Anaciaeschna triangulifera)
- Black-and-blue emperor (Anax chloromelas)
- Blue-spotted comet darner (Anax concolor)
- Dark emperor (Anax congoliath)
- Hemianax ephippiger (Anax ephippiger)
- Lesser green emperor (Anax guttatus)
- Anax immaculifrons
- Emperor (Anax imperator)
- Anax indicus
- Green darner (Anax junius)
- Comet darner (Anax longipes)
- Blue-spotted emperor (Anax nigrofasciatus)
- Anax panybeus
- Baron dragonfly (Anax papuensis)
- Lesser emperor (Anax parthenope)
- Orange emperor (Anax speratus)
- Black emperor (Anax tristis)
- Anax tumorifer
- Andaeschna rufipes
- Multi-spotted darner (Austroaeschna multipunctata)
- Southern giant darner (Austrophlebia costalis)
- Ocellated darner (Boyeria grafiana)
- Boyeria karubei
- Hairy dragonfly (Brachytron pratense)
- Eastern spectre (Caliaeschna microstigma)
- Cephalaeschna dinghuensis
- Cephalaeschna orbifrons
- Cephalaeschna viridifrons
- Blue-faced darner (Coryphaeschna adnexa)
- Coryphaeschna huaorania
- Regal darner (Coryphaeschna ingens)
- Wide-faced darner (Dendroaeschna conspersa)
- Ochre-tipped darner (Dromaeschna weiskei)
- Harlequin darner (Gomphaeschna furcillata)
- Giant duskhawker (Gynacantha africana)
- Gynacantha basiguttata
- Gynacantha bayadera
- Black-kneed duskhawker (Gynacantha bullata)
- Greater girdled duskhawker (Gynacantha cylindrata)
- Plain duskhawker (Gynacantha immaculifrons)
- Gynacantha incisura
- Little duskhawker (Gynacantha manderica)
- Gynacantha nausicaa
- Twilight darner (Gynacantha nervosa)
- Yellow-legged duskhawker (Gynacantha nigeriensis)
- Gynacantha saltatrix
- Dark-rayed duskhawker (Gynacantha sextans)
- Gynacantha subinterrupta
- Usambara duskhawker (Gynacantha usambarica)
- Lesser girdled duskhawker (Gynacantha vesiculata)
- Brown duskhawker (Gynacantha villosa)
- Gynacanthaeschna sikkima
- Heliaeschna crassa
- Blade-tipped duskhawker (Heliaeschna cynthiae)
- Black-banded duskhawker (Heliaeschna fuliginosa)
- Heliaeschna idae
- Hybrid duskhawker (Heliaeschna sembe)
- Heliaeschna simplicia
- Pale duskhawker (Heliaeschna trinervulata)
- Uganda duskhawker (Heliaeschna ugandica)
- Heliaeschna uninervulata
- Indaeschna grubaueri
- Cyrano darner (Nasiaeschna pentacantha)
- Neuraeschna harpya
- Neuraeschna titania
- Periaeschna flinti
- Periaeschna magdalena
- Periaeschna nocturnalis
- Periaeschna zhangzhouensis
- Meru hawker (Pinheyschna meruensis)
- Bullseye hawker (Pinheyschna rileyi)
- Stream hawker (Pinheyschna subpupillata)
- Planaeschna milnei
- Planaeschna risi
- Planaeschna suichangensis
- Planaeschna taiwana
- Polycanthagyna erythromelas
- Polycanthagyna melanictera
- Polycanthagyna ornithocephala
- Malachite darner (Remartinia luteipennis)
- Rhionaeschna diffinis
- Arroyo darner (Rhionaeschna dugesi)
- Rhionaeschna intricata
- Rhionaeschna peralta
- Rhionaeschna planaltica
- Sarasaeschna pryeri
- Tetracanthagyna bakeri
- Tetracanthagyna plagiata
- Tetracanthagyna waterhousei
- Caribbean darner (Triacanthagyna caribbea)
- Triacanthagyna obscuripennis
- Phantom darner (Triacanthagyna trifida)
- Triacanthagyna williamsoni
- Friendly hawker (Zosteraeschna minuscula)

=== Libellulids ===
Species

- Grizzled pintail (Acisoma panorpoides)
- Ivory pintail (Acisoma trifidum)
- Aethiothemis basilewskyi
- Aethiothemis bella
- Aethiothemis bequaerti
- Aethiothemis circe
- Aethiothemis coryndoni
- Aethiothemis ellioti
- Aethiothemis erythromelas
- Aethiothemis incongruens
- Aethiothemis palustris
- Aethiothemis solitaria
- Aethriamanta aethra
- Aethriamanta brevipennis
- Aethriamanta gracilis
- Pygmy basker (Aethriamanta rezia)
- Agrionoptera cynthiae
- Agrionoptera insignis
- Agrionoptera longitudinalis
- Agrionoptera similis
- Silver-spotted skimmer (Argyrothemis argentea)
- Atoconeura biordinata
- Atoconeura eudoxia
- Atoconeura kenya
- Western highlander (Atoconeura luxata)
- Atoconeura pseudeudoxia
- Swamp flat-tail (Austrothemis nigrescens)
- Bironides superstes
- Brachydiplax chalybea
- Brachydiplax denticauda
- Brachydiplax duivenbodei
- Brachydiplax farinosa
- Brachydiplax sobrina
- Brachygonia oculata
- Four-spotted pennant (Brachymesia gravida)
- Tawny pennant (Brachymesia herbida)
- Brachythemis contaminata
- Brachythemis impartita
- Red groundling (Brachythemis lacustris)
- Brachythemis leucosticta
- Wilson's groundling (Brachythemis wilsoni)
- Horned rock-dweller (Bradinopyga cornuta)
- Bradinopyga geminata
- Red rockdweller (Bradinopyga strachani)
- Brechmorhoga praedatrix
- Camacinia gigantea
- Camacinia othello
- Cannaphila vibex
- Red-veined pennant (Celithemis bertha)
- Calico pennant (Celithemis elisa)
- Martha's pennant (Celithemis martha)
- Inspector (Chalcostephia flavifrons)
- Chalybeothemis fluviatilis
- Cratilla lineata
- Cratilla metallica
- Crocothemis brevistigma
- Divisa scarlet (Crocothemis divisa)
- Scarlet dragonfly (Crocothemis erythraea)
- Little scarlet (Crocothemis sanguinolenta)
- Granite scarlet (Crocothemis saxicolor)
- Scarlet skimmer (Crocothemis servilia)
- Bluebolt (Cyanothemis simpsoni)
- Dasythemis mincki
- Deielia phaon
- Diastatops dimidiata
- Diastatops pullata
- Diplacina braueri
- Diplacina lisa
- Diplacina nana
- Diplacina paula
- Red percher dragonfly (Diplacodes bipunctata)
- Little percher (Diplacodes deminuta)
- Diplacodes exilis
- Black percher (Diplacodes lefebvrii)
- Barbet percher (Diplacodes luminans)
- Charcoal-winged percher (Diplacodes nebulosa)
- Dwarf percher (Diplacodes pumila)
- Diplacodes trivialis
- Checkered setwing (Dythemis fugax)
- Swift setwing (Dythemis velox)
- Sunlight firebelly (Eleuthemis buettikoferi)
- Epithemis mariae
- Erythemis carmelita
- Red pondhawk (Erythemis haematogastra)
- Claret pondhawk (Erythemis mithroides)
- Pin-tailed pondhawk (Erythemis plebeja)
- Eastern pondhawk (Erythemis simplicicollis)
- Great pondhawk (Erythemis vesiculosa)
- Erythrodiplax andagoya
- Erythrodiplax cleopatra
- Erythrodiplax fulva
- Erythrodiplax ines
- Erythrodiplax juliana
- Erythrodiplax leticia
- Erythrodiplax lygaea
- Erythrodiplax maculosa
- Erythrodiplax ochracea
- Erythrodiplax pallida
- Erythrodiplax paraguayensis
- White-eyed skimmer (Fylgia amazonica)
- Tiny sylph (Gynothemis pumila)
- Saddled jungleskimmer (Hadrothemis camarensis)
- Robust jungleskimmer (Hadrothemis coacta)
- Scarlet jungleskimmer (Hadrothemis defecta)
- Slender jungleskimmer (Hadrothemis infesta)
- Red jungle-skimmer (Hadrothemis scabrifrons)
- Variable jungleskimmer (Hadrothemis versuta)
- Hadrothemis vrijdaghi
- Hemistigma affine
- African pied-spot (Hemistigma albipunctum)
- Huonia arborophila
- Huonia thais
- Hydrobasileus croceus
- Hylaeothemis clementia
- Indothemis limbata
- Scarlet grenadier (Lathrecista asiatica)
- Dark whiteface (Leucorrhinia albifrons)
- Lilypad whiteface (Leucorrhinia caudalis)
- White-faced darter (Leucorrhinia dubia)
- Frosted whiteface (Leucorrhinia frigida)
- Crimson-ringed whiteface (Leucorrhinia glacialis)
- Large white-faced darter (Leucorrhinia pectoralis)
- Comanche skimmer (Libellula comanche)
- Neon skimmer (Libellula croceipennis)
- Spangled skimmer (Libellula cyanea)
- Broad-bodied chaser (Libellula depressa)
- Libellula foliata
- Scarce chaser (Libellula fulva)
- Widow skimmer (Libellula luctuosa)
- Libellula melli
- Four-spotted chaser (Libellula quadrimaculata)
- Lyriothemis biappendiculata
- Lyriothemis bivittata
- Lyriothemis cleis
- Lyriothemis elegantissima
- Lyriothemis magnificata
- Lyriothemis meyeri
- Wide-bellied skimmer (Lyriothemis pachygastra)
- Lyriothemis tricolor
- Cora's pennant (Macrodiplax cora)
- Macrothemis brevidens
- Antillean sylph (Macrothemis celeno)
- Macrothemis flavescens
- Macrothemis hahneli
- Macrothemis hemichlora
- Macrothemis heteronycha
- Macrothemis idalia
- Straw-colored sylph (Macrothemis inacuta)
- Macrothemis lauriana
- Macrothemis tenuis
- Ringed leaftipper (Malgassophlebia bispina)
- Hyacinth glider (Miathyria marcella)
- Artemis dasher (Micrathyria artemis)
- Black dasher (Micrathyria atra)
- Blue-tipped dasher (Micrathyria caerulistyla)
- Micrathyria catenata
- Caribbean dasher (Micrathyria dissocians)
- Forest dasher (Micrathyria hippolyte)
- Micrathyria longifasciata
- Micrathyria schumanni
- Micrathyria spinifera
- Micrathyria spuria
- Micrathyria stawiarskii
- Micrathyria sympriona
- Pale-footed dasher (Micrathyria tibialis)
- Stream micmac (Micromacromia camerunica)
- Small micmac (Micromacromia zygoptera)
- Misagria bimacula
- Nannophlebia anatya
- Common archtail (Nannophlebia risi)
- Eastern pygmyfly (Nannophya dalei)
- Western pygmyfly (Nannophya occidentalis)
- Scarlet dwarf (Nannophya pygmaea)
- Nannophyopsis clara
- Neodythemis afra
- Neodythemis campioni
- Neodythemis klingi
- Neodythemis preussi
- Stripe-fronted dryad (Nephepeltia leonardina)
- Spine-bellied dryad (Nephepeltia phryne)
- Eastern blacktail (Nesciothemis farinosa)
- Nesciothemis fitzgeraldi
- Small blacktail (Nesciothemis minor)
- Northern redtail (Nesciothemis nigeriensis)
- Western blacktail (Nesciothemis pujoli)
- Nesoxenia lineata
- Neurothemis fluctuans
- Neurothemis fulvia
- Neurothemis intermedia
- Neurothemis ramburii
- Neurothemis terminata
- Neurothemis tullia
- Eastern forestwatcher (Notiothemis jonesi)
- Western forestwatcher (Notiothemis robertsi)
- Oligoclada abbreviata
- Oligoclada monosticha
- Oligoclada teretidentis
- Bottletail (Olpogastra lugubris)
- Onychothemis culminicola
- Onychothemis testacea
- Orchithemis pruinans
- Orchithemis pulcherrima
- Yellow-lined skimmer (Orthemis biolleyi)
- Concolored skimmer (Orthemis concolor)
- Roseate skimmer (Orthemis ferruginea)
- Orthemis nodiplaga
- Regal skimmer (Orthemis regalis)
- Orthemis sulphurata
- Orthemis tambopatae
- Abbott's skimmer (Orthetrum abbotti)
- Orthetrum africanum
- White-tailed skimmer (Orthetrum albistylum)
- Many-celled skimmer (Orthetrum angustiventre)
- Giant skimmer (Orthetrum austeni)
- Orthetrum azureum
- Speckled skimmer (Orthetrum balteatum)
- Banded skimmer (Orthetrum brachiale)
- Southern skimmer (Orthetrum brunneum)
- Two-striped skimmer (Orthetrum caffrum)
- One-spriped skimmer (Orthetrum camerunense)
- Black-tailed skimmer (Orthetrum cancellatum)
- Orthetrum chrysis
- Epaulet skimmer (Orthetrum chrysostigma)
- Keeled skimmer (Orthetrum coerulescens)
- Orthetrum glaucum
- Guinea skimmer (Orthetrum guineense)
- Dark-shouldered skimmer (Orthetrum hintzi)
- Spectacled skimmer (Orthetrum icteromelas)
- Orthetrum japonicum
- Julia skimmer (Orthetrum julia)
- Orthetrum kollmannspergeri
- Orthetrum kristenseni
- Orthetrum latihami
- Orthetrum lineostigma
- Orthetrum luzonicum
- Highland skimmer (Orthetrum machadoi)
- Orthetrum macrostigma
- Orthetrum melania
- Farmbush skimmer (Orthetrum microstigma)
- Rosy skimmer (Orthetrum migratum)
- Woodland skimmer (Orthetrum monardi)
- Orthetrum pruinosum
- Ransonnet's skimmer (Orthetrum ransonnetii)
- Robust skimmer (Orthetrum robustum)
- Slender skimmer (Orthetrum sabina)
- Orthetrum saegeri
- Green skimmer (Orthetrum serapia)
- Bold skimmer (Orthetrum stemmale)
- Small skimmer (Orthetrum taeniolatum)
- Orthetrum testaceum
- Orthetrum triangulare
- Long skimmer (Orthetrum trinacria)
- Pepperpants (Oxythemis phoenicosceles)
- Palpopleura albifrons
- Deceptive widow (Palpopleura deceptor)
- Yellow-veined widow (Palpopleura jucunda)
- Lucia widow (Palpopleura lucia)
- Portia widow (Palpopleura portia)
- Palpopleura sexmaculata
- Palpopleura vestita
- Wandering glider (Pantala flavescens)
- Banded duskdarter (Parazyxomma flavicans)
- Orange amberwing (Perithemis cornelia)
- Slough amberwing (Perithemis domitia)
- Golden amberwing (Perithemis electra)
- Perithemis icteroptera
- Fine-banded amberwing (Perithemis lais)
- Clear-tipped amberwing (Perithemis parzefalli)
- Ruby amberwing (Perithemis rubita)
- Scarlet spiderlegs (Planiplax arachne)
- Planiplax erythropyga
- Porpax asperipes
- Porpax bipunctus
- Porpax garambensis
- Porpax risi
- Porpax sentipes
- Swampwatcher (Potamarcha congener)
- Protorthemis woodfordi
- Pseudothemis jorina
- Pied skimmer (Pseudothemis zonata)
- Cardinal redskimmer (Rhodopygia cardinalis)
- Rhodopygia hinei
- Slender redskimmer (Rhodopygia hollandi)
- Rhodothemis rufa
- Rhyothemis apicalis
- Rhyothemis aterrima
- Rhyothemis cognata
- Skylight flutterer (Rhyothemis fenestrina)
- Rhyothemis fuliginosa
- Mariposa flutterer (Rhyothemis mariposa)
- Veiled flutterer (Rhyothemis notata)
- Rhyothemis obsolescens
- Yellow-striped flutterer (Rhyothemis variegata)
- Rhyothemis plutonia
- Sapphire flutterer (Rhyothemis princeps)
- Phantom flutterer (Rhyothemis semihyalina)
- Rhyothemis triangularis
- Risiophlebia dohrni
- Black pennant (Selysiothemis nigra)
- Blue-faced meadowhawk (Sympetrum ambiguum)
- Sympetrum arenicolor
- Sympetrum baccha
- Sympetrum commixtum
- Sympetrum darwinianum
- Sympetrum eroticum
- Yellow-winged darter (Sympetrum flaveolum)
- Red-veined darter (Sympetrum fonscolombii)
- Sympetrum haematoneura
- Dwarf darter (Sympetrum haritonovi)
- Sympetrum hypomelas
- Cardinal meadowhawk (Sympetrum illotum)
- Sympetrum infuscatum
- Cherry-faced meadowhawk (Sympetrum internum)
- Red-veined meadowhawk (Sympetrum madidum)
- Southern darter (Sympetrum meridionale)
- Island darter (Sympetrum nigrifemur)
- Talamanca meadowhawk (Sympetrum nigrocreatum)
- Sympetrum parvulum
- Banded darter (Sympetrum pedemontanum)
- Ruddy darter (Sympetrum sanguineum)
- Desert darter (Sympetrum sinaiticum)
- Common darter (Sympetrum striolatum)
- Vagrant darter (Sympetrum vulgatum)
- Forest elf (Tetrathemis camerunensis)
- Club-tailed elfe (Tetrathemis corduliformis)
- Tetrathemis godiardi
- Rainforest elf (Tetrathemis irregularis)
- Tetrathemis longfieldae
- Tetrathemis platyptera
- Black-splashed elf (Tetrathemis polleni)
- Dash-winged piedface (Thermochoria equivocata)
- Clear-winged piedface (Thermochoria jeanneli)
- Thermorthemis madagascariensis
- Old World twister (Tholymis tillarga)
- Keyhole glider (Tramea basilaris)
- Striped saddlebags (Tramea calverti)
- Carolina saddlebags (Tramea carolina)
- Ferruginous glider (Tramea limbata)
- Tramea loewii
- Red-mantled saddlebags (Tramea onusta)
- Tramea rustica
- Red glider dragonfly (Tramea transmarina)
- Tramea virginia
- Halfshade dropwing (Trithemis aconita)
- Bronze dropwing (Trithemis aenea)
- Western phantom dropwing (Trithemis africana)
- Violet dropwing (Trithemis annulata)
- Trithemis anomala
- Trithemis apicalis
- Red-veined dropwing (Trithemis arteriosa)
- Crimson marsh glider (Trithemis aurora)
- Trithemis basitincta
- Trithemis bifida
- Trithemis bredoi
- Trithemis congolica
- Trithemis dejouxi
- Black dropwing (Trithemis dichroa)
- Denim dropwing (Trithemis donaldsoni)
- Highland dropwing (Trithemis dorsalis)
- Trithemis dubia
- Trithemis ellenbeckii
- Black stream glider (Trithemis festiva)
- Navy dropwing (Trithemis furva)
- Trithemis grouti
- Silhouette dropwing (Trithemis hecate)
- Copycat dropwing (Trithemis imitata)
- Albertine dropwing (Trithemis integra)
- Trithemis kalula
- Orange-winged dropwing (Trithemis kirbyi)
- Trithemis leakeyi
- Trithemis lilacina
- Trithemis longistyla
- Monard's dropwing (Trithemis monardi)
- Hairy-legged dropwing (Trithemis nuptialis)
- Long-legged marsh glider (Trithemis pallidinervis)
- Russet dropwing (Trithemis pluvialis)
- Cobalt dropwing (Trithemis pruinata)
- Jaunty dropwing (Trithemis stictica)
- Eastern phantom dropwing (Trithemis tropicana)
- Elegant dropwing (Trithemis werneri)
- Trithetrum congoense
- Fiery darter (Trithetrum navasi)
- Tyriobapta torrida
- Red basker (Urothemis assignata)
- Blue basker (Urothemis edwardsii)
- Urothemis signata
- Rainforest bluewing (Zenithoptera fasciata)
- Zenithoptera viola
- Zygonoides fraseri
- Southern riverking (Zygonoides fuelleborni)
- Zygonoides occidentis
- Zygonyx asahinai
- Zygonyx atritibiae
- Zygonyx chrysobaphes
- Zygonyx elisabethae
- Zygonyx eusebia
- Ensign cascader (Zygonyx flavicosta)
- Zygonyx geminunca
- Zygonyx ida
- Zygonyx iris
- Blue cascader (Zygonyx natalensis)
- Regal cascader (Zygonyx regisalberti)
- Zygonyx speciosus
- Zygonyx takasago
- Ringed cascader (Zygonyx torridus)
- Smoky duskdarter (Zyxomma atlanticum)
- Zyxomma multinervinervis
- Long-tailed duskdarter (Zyxomma petiolatum)

Subspecies

- Acisoma panorpoides ascalaphoides
- Orthetrum coerulescens anceps
- Orthetrum julia falsum

=== Polythorids ===
- Glitterwing (Chalcopteryx rutilans)
- Tepui bannerwing (Chalcothore montgomeryi)
- Black-banded bannerwing (Cora aurea)
- Cora irene
- Cora jocosa
- Cora klenei
- Cora marina
- Cora terminalis
- Euthore fassli
- Euthore fastigiata
- Euthore meridana
- Polythore aurora
- Polythore boliviana
- Polythore concinna
- Polythore derivata
- Polythore lamerceda
- Polythore manua
- Polythore mutata
- Polythore ornata
- Polythore spaeteri
- Polythore terminata
- Polythore victoria

=== Other Odonata species ===
- Devadatta argyoides
- Devadatta cyanocephala
- Devadatta ducatrix
- Tropical rockmaster (Diphlebia euphoeoides)
- Whitewater rockmaster (Diphlebia lestoides)
- Gomphomacromia fallax
- White-dotted redspot (Hypopetalia pestilens)
- Idionyx carinata
- Idionyx claudia
- Idionyx iida
- Idionyx intricata
- Idionyx philippa
- Idionyx rhinoceroides
- Idionyx selysi
- Idionyx stevensi
- Idionyx thailandica
- Idomacromia lieftincki
- Idomacromia proavita
- Isosticta spinipes
- Macromidia donaldi
- Macromidia genialis
- Macromidia ishidai
- Macromidia kelloggi
- Macromidia rapida
- Macromidia samal
- Forest mosquitohawk (Micromidia atrifrons)
- Neophya rutherfordi
- Chilean petaltail (Phenes raptor)
- Philoganga montana
- Ochre titan (Philoganga vetusta)
- Narrow-flanged redspot (Phyllopetalia apicalis)
- Apollo redspot (Phyllopetalia apollo)
- Pudu redspot (Phyllopetalia pudu)
- Northern wiretail (Rhadinosticta banksi)
- Pantepui relict damsel (Rimanella arcana)
- Gray petaltail (Tachopteryx thoreyi)
- Tanymecosticta fissicollis
- Bush giant dragonfly (Uropetala carovei)
- Mountain giant dragonfly (Uropetala chiltoni)

== See also ==
- Lists of IUCN Red List least concern species
- List of near threatened insects
- List of vulnerable insects
- List of endangered insects
- List of critically endangered insects
- List of recently extinct insects
- List of data deficient insects
