= Allocnemis abbotti =

Conservation status
- Near Threatened (IUCN 3.1)

Scientific classification
- Kingdom: Animalia
- Phylum: Arthropoda
- Class: Insecta
- Order: Odonata
- Suborder: Zygoptera
- Family: Platycnemididae
- Genus: Allocnemis
- Species: A. abbotti

Binomial name
- Allocnemis abbotti (Calvert, 1896)

Species of damselfly

Allocnemis abbotti, formerly Chlorocnemis abbotti, is a species of white-legged damselfly in the family Platycnemididae. It is found in Kenya, Malawi, and Tanzania. Its natural habitats are subtropical or tropical moist lowland forests, rivers, intermittent rivers, and freshwater springs. It is threatened by habitat loss.

The IUCN conservation status of Allocnemis abbotti is "NT", near threatened. The species may be considered threatened in the near future. The IUCN status was reviewed in 2010.
