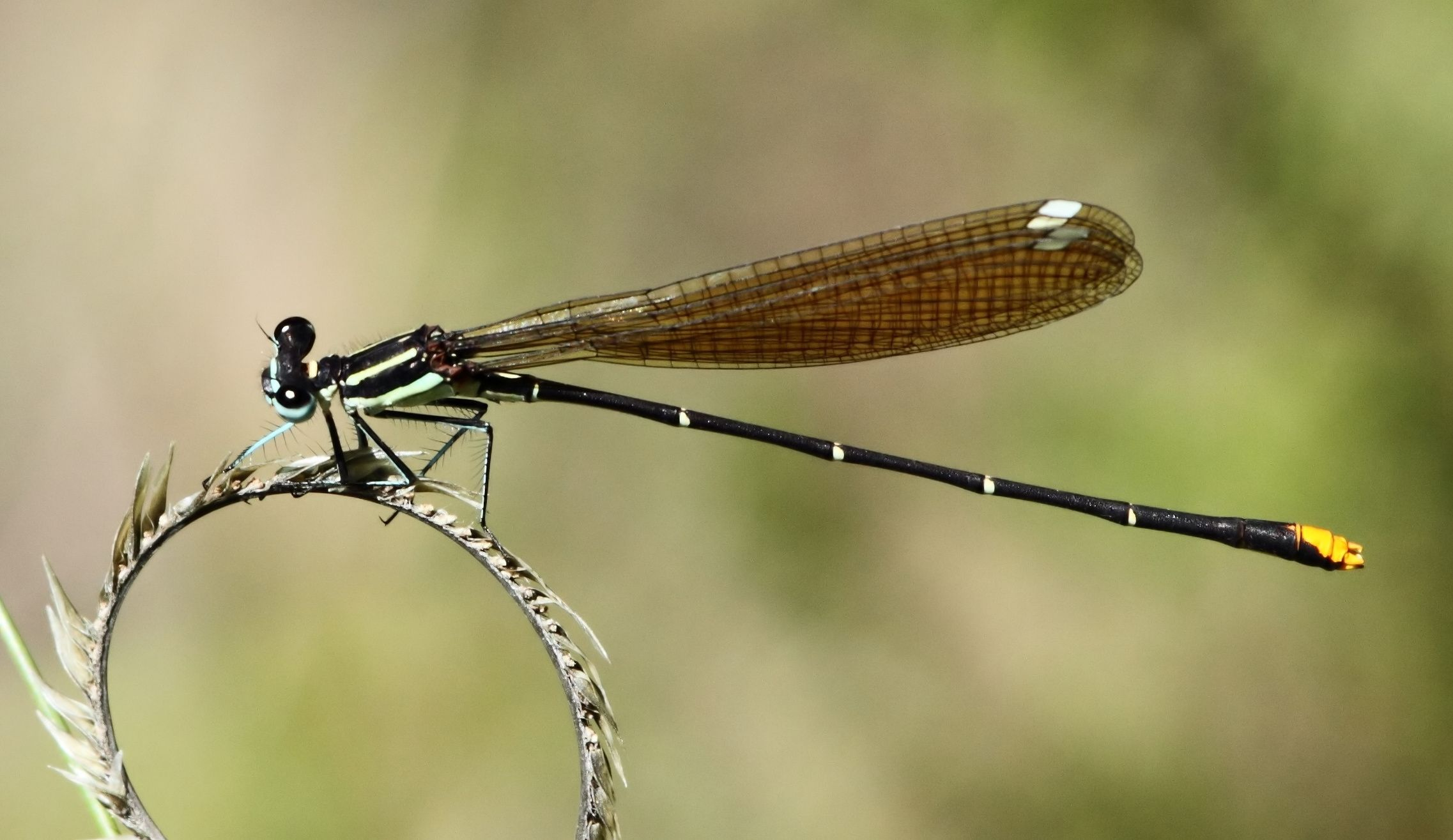
- Allocnemis leucosticta

Scientific classification
- Kingdom: Animalia
- Phylum: Arthropoda
- Class: Insecta
- Order: Odonata
- Suborder: Zygoptera
- Family: Platycnemididae
- Subfamily: Allocnemidinae
- Genus: Allocnemis; Selys, 1863

= Allocnemis =

Genus of damselflies

Allocnemis, formerly Chlorocnemis, is a genus of damselflies in the family Platycnemididae.

- Allocnemis abbotti (Calvert, 1896)
- Allocnemis contraria (Schmidt, 1951)
- Allocnemis cyanura (Förster, 1909)
- Allocnemis eisentrauti (Pinhey, 1974)
- Allocnemis elongata (Hagen in Selys, 1863)
- Allocnemis flavipennis (Selys, 1863)
- Allocnemis interrupta (Legrand, 1984)
- Allocnemis leucosticta Selys, 1863
- Allocnemis maccleeryi (Pinhey, 1969)
- Allocnemis marshalli (Ris, 1921)
- Allocnemis mitwabae Pinhey, 1961
- Allocnemis montana (St. Quentin, 1942)
- Allocnemis nigripes (Selys, 1886)
- Allocnemis pauli (Longfield, 1936)
- Allocnemis subnodalis (Selys, 1886)
- Allocnemis superba (Schmidt, 1951)
- Allocnemis vicki Dijkstra & Schütte, 2015
- Allocnemis wittei (Fraser, 1955)
