= Allocnemis vicki =

Conservation status
- Endangered (IUCN 3.1)

Scientific classification
- Kingdom: Animalia
- Phylum: Arthropoda
- Class: Insecta
- Order: Odonata
- Suborder: Zygoptera
- Family: Platycnemididae
- Genus: Allocnemis
- Species: A. vicki

Binomial name
- Allocnemis vicki Dijkstra & Schütte, 2015

Species of damselfly

Allocnemis vicki is a species of white-legged damselfly in the family Platycnemididae.

The IUCN conservation status of Allocnemis vicki is "EN", endangered. The species faces a high risk of extinction in the near future. The IUCN status was reviewed in 2017.
