= Allocnemis maccleeryi =

Conservation status
- Critically Endangered (IUCN 3.1)

Scientific classification
- Kingdom: Animalia
- Phylum: Arthropoda
- Class: Insecta
- Order: Odonata
- Suborder: Zygoptera
- Family: Platycnemididae
- Genus: Allocnemis
- Species: A. maccleeryi

Binomial name
- Allocnemis maccleeryi (Pinhey, 1969)

Species of damselfly

Allocnemis maccleeryi is a species of white-legged damselfly in the family Platycnemididae.

The IUCN conservation status of Allocnemis maccleeryi is "CR", critically endangered. The species faces an extremely high risk of extinction in the immediate future. The IUCN status was reviewed in 2010.
