= Allocnemis montana =

Conservation status
- Endangered (IUCN 3.1)

Scientific classification
- Kingdom: Animalia
- Phylum: Arthropoda
- Class: Insecta
- Order: Odonata
- Suborder: Zygoptera
- Family: Platycnemididae
- Genus: Allocnemis
- Species: A. montana

Binomial name
- Allocnemis montana (St. Quentin, 1942)

Species of damselfly

Allocnemis montana, formerly Chlorocnemis montana, is a species of white-legged damselfly in the family Platycnemididae. It is found in Malawi and Tanzania. Its natural habitats are rivers and freshwater springs.

The IUCN conservation status of Allocnemis montana is "EN", endangered. The species faces a high risk of extinction in the near future. The IUCN status was reviewed in 2010.
