= Allocnemis eisentrauti =

Conservation status
- Data Deficient (IUCN 3.1)

Scientific classification
- Kingdom: Animalia
- Phylum: Arthropoda
- Class: Insecta
- Order: Odonata
- Suborder: Zygoptera
- Family: Platycnemididae
- Subfamily: Allocnemidinae
- Genus: Allocnemis
- Species: A. eisentrauti

Binomial name
- Allocnemis eisentrauti (Pinhey, 1974)

Species of damselfly

Allocnemis eisentrauti is a species of white-legged damselfly in the family Platycnemididae.
