= Allocnemis interrupta =

Conservation status
- Near Threatened (IUCN 3.1)

Scientific classification
- Kingdom: Animalia
- Phylum: Arthropoda
- Class: Insecta
- Order: Odonata
- Suborder: Zygoptera
- Family: Platycnemididae
- Genus: Allocnemis
- Species: A. interrupta

Binomial name
- Allocnemis interrupta (Legrand, 1984)

Species of damselfly

Allocnemis interrupta is a species of white-legged damselfly in the family Platycnemididae.

The IUCN conservation status of Allocnemis interrupta is "NT", near threatened. The species may be considered threatened in the near future. The IUCN status was reviewed in 2018.
