= Allocnemis mitwabae =

Conservation status
- Endangered (IUCN 3.1)

Scientific classification
- Kingdom: Animalia
- Phylum: Arthropoda
- Class: Insecta
- Order: Odonata
- Suborder: Zygoptera
- Family: Platycnemididae
- Genus: Allocnemis
- Species: A. mitwabae

Binomial name
- Allocnemis mitwabae Pinhey, 1961

Species of damselfly

Allocnemis mitwabae is a species of damselfly in the family Platycnemididae. It is endemic to the Democratic Republic of the Congo. Its natural habitat is rivers. It is threatened by habitat loss.
