= Allocnemis flavipennis =

Conservation status
- Least Concern (IUCN 3.1)

Scientific classification
- Kingdom: Animalia
- Phylum: Arthropoda
- Class: Insecta
- Order: Odonata
- Suborder: Zygoptera
- Family: Platycnemididae
- Genus: Allocnemis
- Species: A. flavipennis

Binomial name
- Allocnemis flavipennis (Selys, 1863)

Species of damselfly

Allocnemis flavipennis is a species of white-legged damselfly in the family Platycnemididae.

The IUCN conservation status of Allocnemis flavipennis is "LC", least concern, with no immediate threat to the species' survival. The IUCN status was reviewed in 2010.
