= Allocnemis superba =

Conservation status
- Least Concern (IUCN 3.1)

Scientific classification
- Kingdom: Animalia
- Phylum: Arthropoda
- Class: Insecta
- Order: Odonata
- Suborder: Zygoptera
- Family: Platycnemididae
- Genus: Allocnemis
- Species: A. superba

Binomial name
- Allocnemis superba (Schmidt, 1951)

Species of damselfly

Allocnemis superba is a species of white-legged damselfly in the family Platycnemididae.

The IUCN conservation status of Allocnemis superba is "LC", least concern, with no immediate threat to the species' survival. The IUCN status was reviewed in 2016.
