= Orthetrum camerunense =

Conservation status
- Least Concern (IUCN 3.1)

Scientific classification
- Kingdom: Animalia
- Phylum: Arthropoda
- Clade: Pancrustacea
- Class: Insecta
- Order: Odonata
- Infraorder: Anisoptera
- Family: Libellulidae
- Genus: Orthetrum
- Species: O. camerunense

Binomial name
- Orthetrum camerunense Gambles, 1959

Species of dragonfly

Orthetrum camerunense is a species of dragonfly in family Libellulidae. It is found in Cameroon, Central African Republic, Kenya, Nigeria, Uganda, and possibly Tanzania. Its natural habitats are subtropical or tropical moist lowland forests, subtropical or tropical moist montane forests, and rivers.
