= Scybalophagus rugosus =

Scientific classification
- Kingdom: Animalia
- Phylum: Arthropoda
- Class: Insecta
- Order: Coleoptera
- Suborder: Polyphaga
- Infraorder: Scarabaeiformia
- Family: Scarabaeidae
- Genus: Scybalophagus
- Species: S. rugosus

Binomial name
- Scybalophagus rugosus (Blanchard, 1845)

Synonyms
- Canthon rugosum Blanchard, 1845; Epirinus zumpti Frey, 1963; Canthon tessellatus Erichson, 1847

Species of beetle

Scybalophagus rugosus is a species of beetle of the family Scarabaeidae. It is found in Argentina, Bolivia, Chile and Peru.

== Description ==
Adults reach a length of about 11-12 mm. The upper and lower surfaces are uniformly black and dull. The upper surface is smooth and the legs have long, black hairs. The clypeus has two blunt teeth, with a semicircular notch between them. The surface of the pronotum is very flat but wrinkled and the elytra are broadly striated, with the intervals continuously notched.
