= Allocnemis subnodalis =

Conservation status
- Least Concern (IUCN 3.1)

Scientific classification
- Kingdom: Animalia
- Phylum: Arthropoda
- Class: Insecta
- Order: Odonata
- Suborder: Zygoptera
- Family: Platycnemididae
- Genus: Allocnemis
- Species: A. subnodalis

Binomial name
- Allocnemis subnodalis (Selys, 1886)

Species of damselfly

Allocnemis subnodalis is a species of white-legged damselfly in the family Platycnemididae.

The IUCN conservation status of Allocnemis subnodalis is "LC", least concern, with no immediate threat to the species' survival. The IUCN status was reviewed in 2010.
