= Allocnemis wittei =

Conservation status
- Least Concern (IUCN 3.1)

Scientific classification
- Kingdom: Animalia
- Phylum: Arthropoda
- Class: Insecta
- Order: Odonata
- Suborder: Zygoptera
- Family: Platycnemididae
- Genus: Allocnemis
- Species: A. wittei

Binomial name
- Allocnemis wittei (Fraser, 1955)

Species of damselfly

Allocnemis wittei is a species of white-legged damselfly in the family Platycnemididae.

The IUCN conservation status of Allocnemis wittei is Least Concern "LC." There is no immediate threat to the species' survival. The IUCN status was reviewed in 2010.
