= Allocnemis elongata =

Conservation status
- Least Concern (IUCN 3.1)

Scientific classification
- Kingdom: Animalia
- Phylum: Arthropoda
- Class: Insecta
- Order: Odonata
- Suborder: Zygoptera
- Family: Platycnemididae
- Genus: Allocnemis
- Species: A. elongata

Binomial name
- Allocnemis elongata (Hagen in Selys, 1863)

Species of damselfly

Allocnemis elongata is a species of white-legged damselfly in the family Platycnemididae.

The IUCN conservation status of Allocnemis elongata is "LC", least concern, with no immediate threat to the species' survival. The IUCN status was reviewed in 2010.
