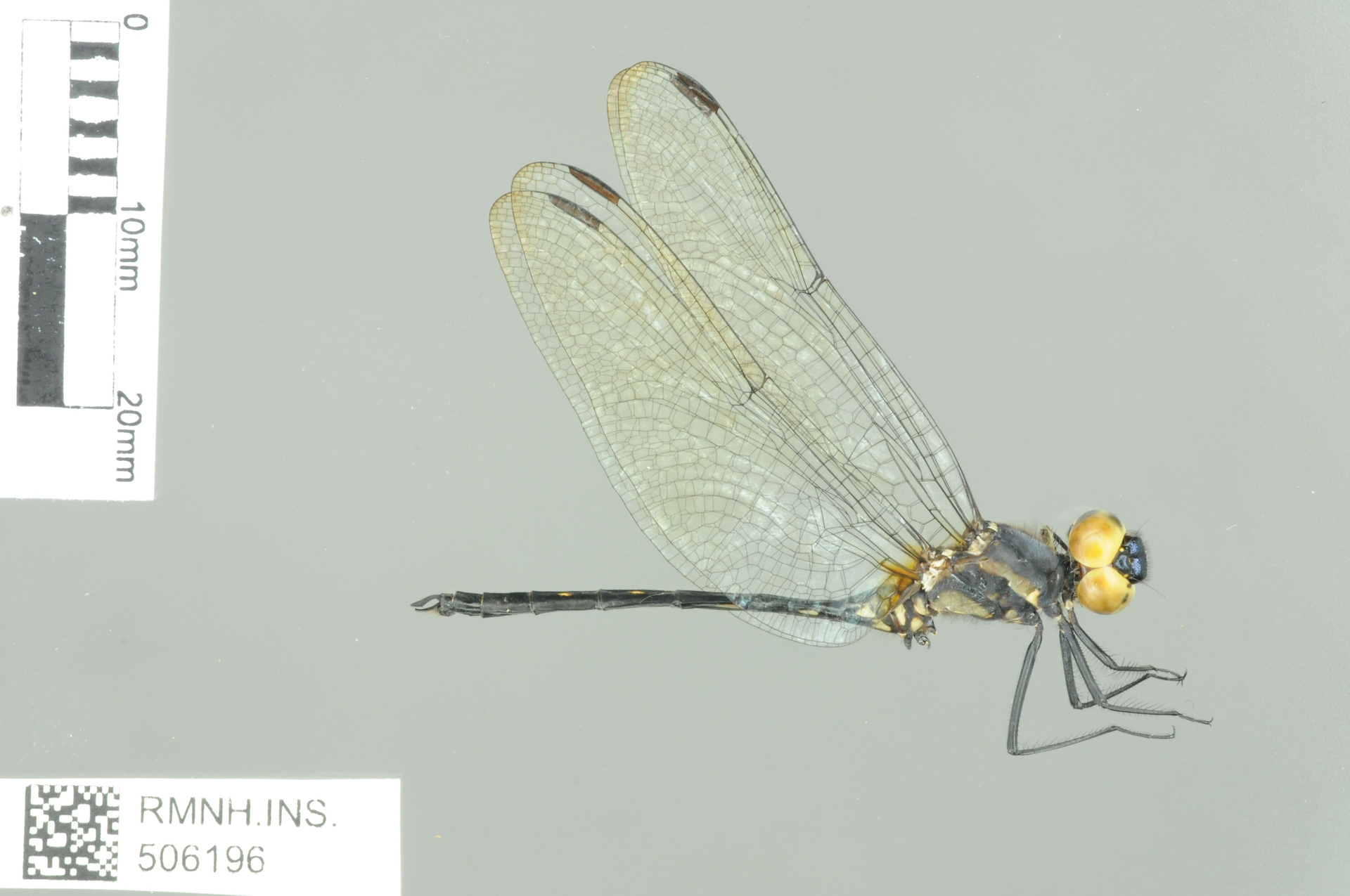

Conservation status
- Least Concern (IUCN 3.1)

Scientific classification
- Kingdom: Animalia
- Phylum: Arthropoda
- Class: Insecta
- Order: Odonata
- Infraorder: Anisoptera
- Family: Libellulidae
- Genus: Trithemis
- Species: T. apicalis

Binomial name
- Trithemis apicalis (Fraser, 1954)

Synonyms
- Anectothemis apicalis; Congothemis apicalis; Porpacithemis trithemoides; Trithemis osvaldae

= Trithemis apicalis =

Species of dragonfly

Trithemis apicalis is a species of dragonfly in the family Libellulidae. It is native to the Democratic Republic of the Congo, and at least one specimen has been collected in Cameroon. It may occur in other nations, including Nigeria. The taxonomy of the species is not entirely clear, and it has been placed in several genera.
