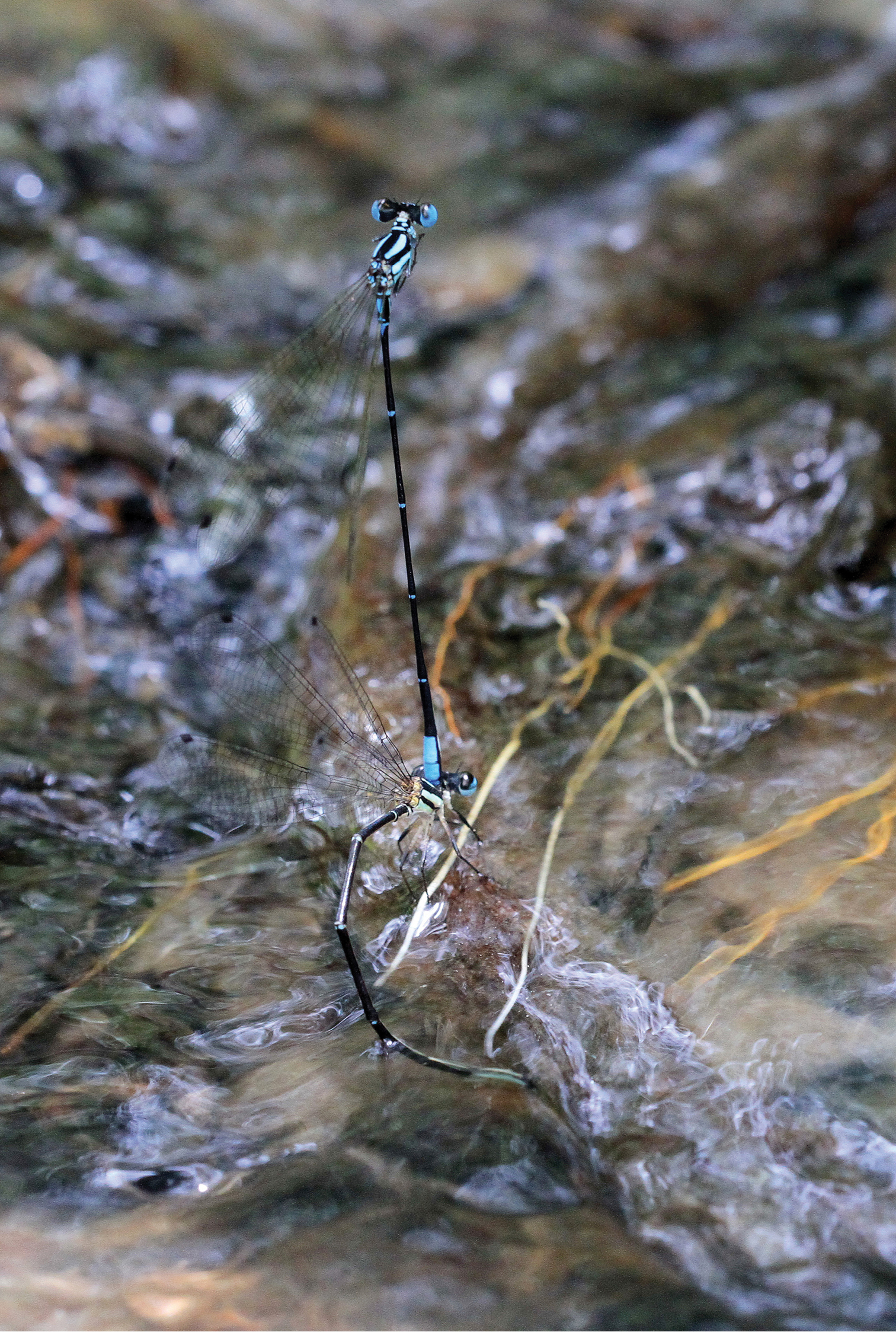

Conservation status
- Least Concern (IUCN 3.1)

Scientific classification
- Kingdom: Animalia
- Phylum: Arthropoda
- Class: Insecta
- Order: Odonata
- Suborder: Zygoptera
- Family: Platycnemididae
- Genus: Allocnemis
- Species: A. marshalli

Binomial name
- Allocnemis marshalli (Ris, 1921)

= Allocnemis marshalli =

Species of damselfly

Allocnemis marshalli, formerly Chlorocnemis marshalli, is a species of white-legged damselfly in the family Platycnemididae. It is found in the Democratic Republic of the Congo, Malawi, Mozambique, Zambia, and Zimbabwe. Its natural habitats are subtropical or tropical moist lowland forests, rivers, and freshwater springs.

The IUCN conservation status of Allocnemis marshalli is "LC", least concern, with no immediate threat to the species' survival. The IUCN status was reviewed in 2010.
