= Allocnemis contraria =

Conservation status
- Least Concern (IUCN 3.1)

Scientific classification
- Kingdom: Animalia
- Phylum: Arthropoda
- Class: Insecta
- Order: Odonata
- Suborder: Zygoptera
- Family: Platycnemididae
- Genus: Allocnemis
- Species: A. contraria

Binomial name
- Allocnemis contraria (Schmidt, 1951)

Species of damselfly

Allocnemis contraria is a species of white-legged damselfly in the family Platycnemididae.

The IUCN conservation status of Allocnemis contraria is "LC", least concern, with no immediate threat to the species' survival. The IUCN status was reviewed in 2010.
