= Allocnemis pauli =

Conservation status
- Least Concern (IUCN 3.1)

Scientific classification
- Kingdom: Animalia
- Phylum: Arthropoda
- Class: Insecta
- Order: Odonata
- Suborder: Zygoptera
- Family: Platycnemididae
- Genus: Allocnemis
- Species: A. pauli

Binomial name
- Allocnemis pauli (Longfield, 1936)

Species of damselfly

Allocnemis pauli is a species of white-legged damselfly in the family Platycnemididae. It is found in the Democratic Republic of the Congo, Kenya, Nigeria, and Uganda. Its natural habitats are subtropical or tropical moist lowland forests, rivers, intermittent rivers, and freshwater springs.

The IUCN conservation status of Allocnemis pauli is "LC", least concern, with no immediate threat to the species' survival. The IUCN status was reviewed in 2016.
