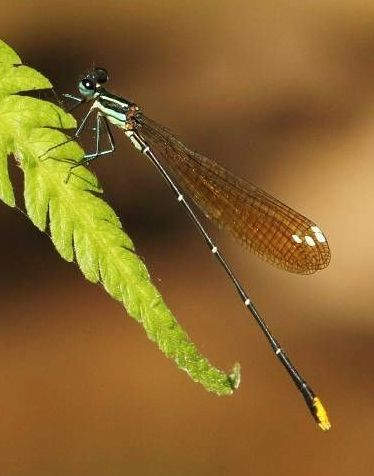

Conservation status
- Least Concern (IUCN 3.1)

Scientific classification
- Kingdom: Animalia
- Phylum: Arthropoda
- Clade: Pancrustacea
- Class: Insecta
- Order: Odonata
- Suborder: Zygoptera
- Family: Platycnemididae
- Genus: Allocnemis
- Species: A. leucosticta

Binomial name
- Allocnemis leucosticta Selys, 1863

= Allocnemis leucosticta =

Species of damselfly

Allocnemis leucosticta, the goldtail or goudstertjie, is a species of damselfly in the family Platycnemididae. It is endemic to South Africa and Eswatini, where it lives near streams and rivers in wooded areas.

== Description ==
This is a highly distinctive medium-sized (50 mm (2.0 in) wingspan) damselfly, easily told apart from other species in the region. It has a blue face which extends down below the eyes. The dark abdomen is long and slender with narrow white bands at each segment. The wings are a smoky yellow-brown with diagnostic white Pterostigmata, forming a wide wing spot near the tip. The white pterostigmata and yellowish wings are conspicuous in flight, making them easy to identify. Males and females look remarkably similar, with only the tip of the thorax differing. In males this is gold, while in females this may be gold, pale blue or white.

== Distribution and habitat ==
Goldtails are mainly found in the mid to high altitude escarpment areas of South Africa and Eswatini. It is also, however, found at sea level in some places in KwaZulu-Natal and the Southern Cape. Its range extends from Table Mountain in the Western Cape to the Soutpansberg in Limpopo. It is common but localised across its range due to its habitat requirements.

This species prefers streams that have clear, shallow water. Nymphs are found under stones in the backwaters (areas where the currents are weak) of these streams. This species is most commonly found in shady habitats, such as forested or well wooded streams and rivers or wooded ravines. It is also occasionally found around less shaded streams surrounded by grass and bushes, particularly in fynbos and montane grassland habitats.

== Ecology ==
This species is most active from October to April, or spring to early autumn. They almost always perch on twigs, stems or vegetation over or close to the water. The males are highly noticeable as they sit in exposed positions over the stream in dappled sunlight. The females are often found near the males but are less numerous and are not quite as conspicuous.

After mating, the male will continue to clasp the female behind her head and hold her as she dangles vertically, her abdomen submerged in the water. This allows her to lay her eggs in the rotten submerged twigs.

== Conservation ==
This species is listed as least concern by the IUCN. Goldtails are, however, fairly sensitive to habitat degradation as they are intolerant of dirty water. They can be found on streams with some alien vegetation.

== Gallery ==
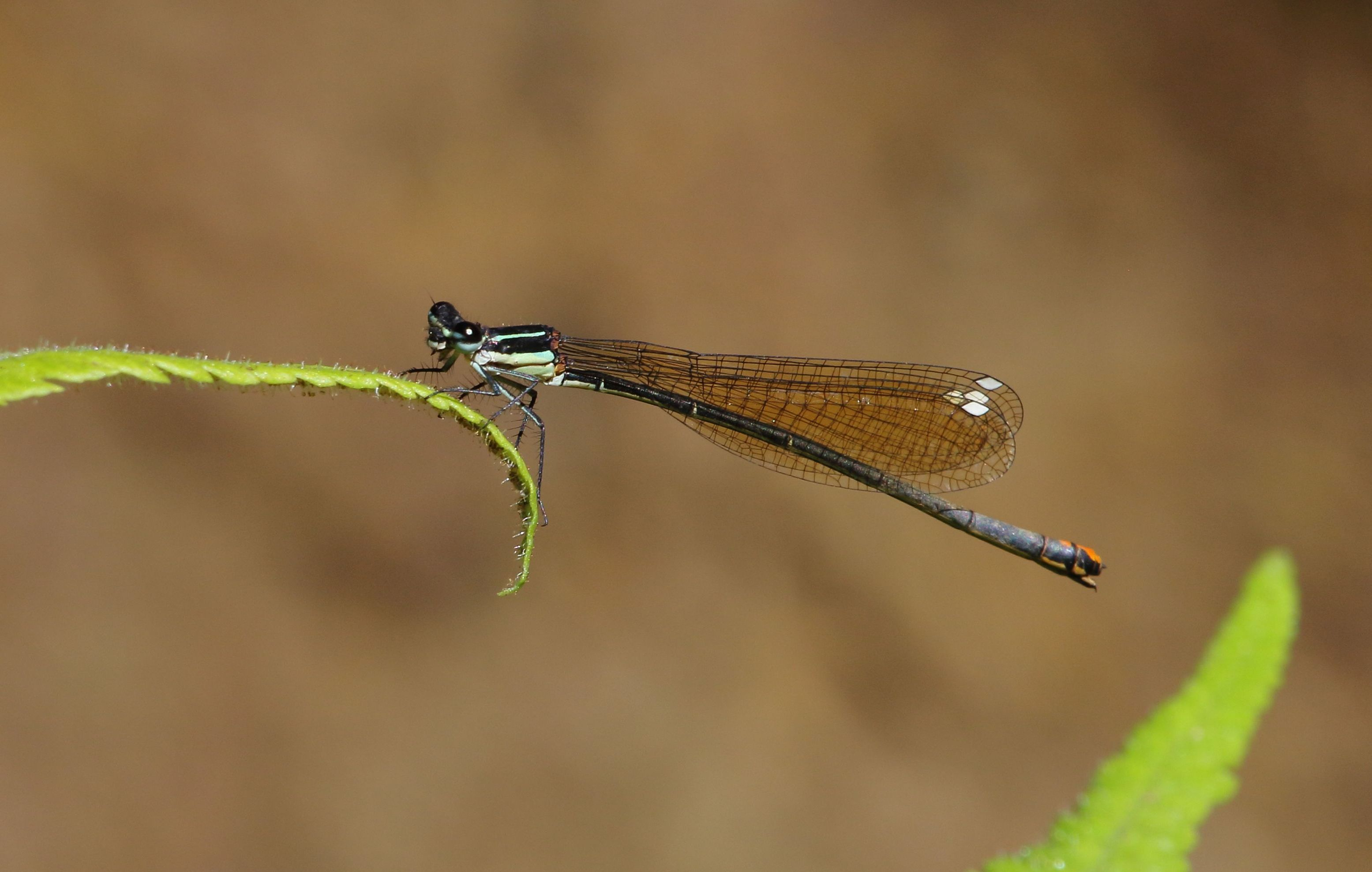
Female goldtail near Impendle, KwaZulu-Natal

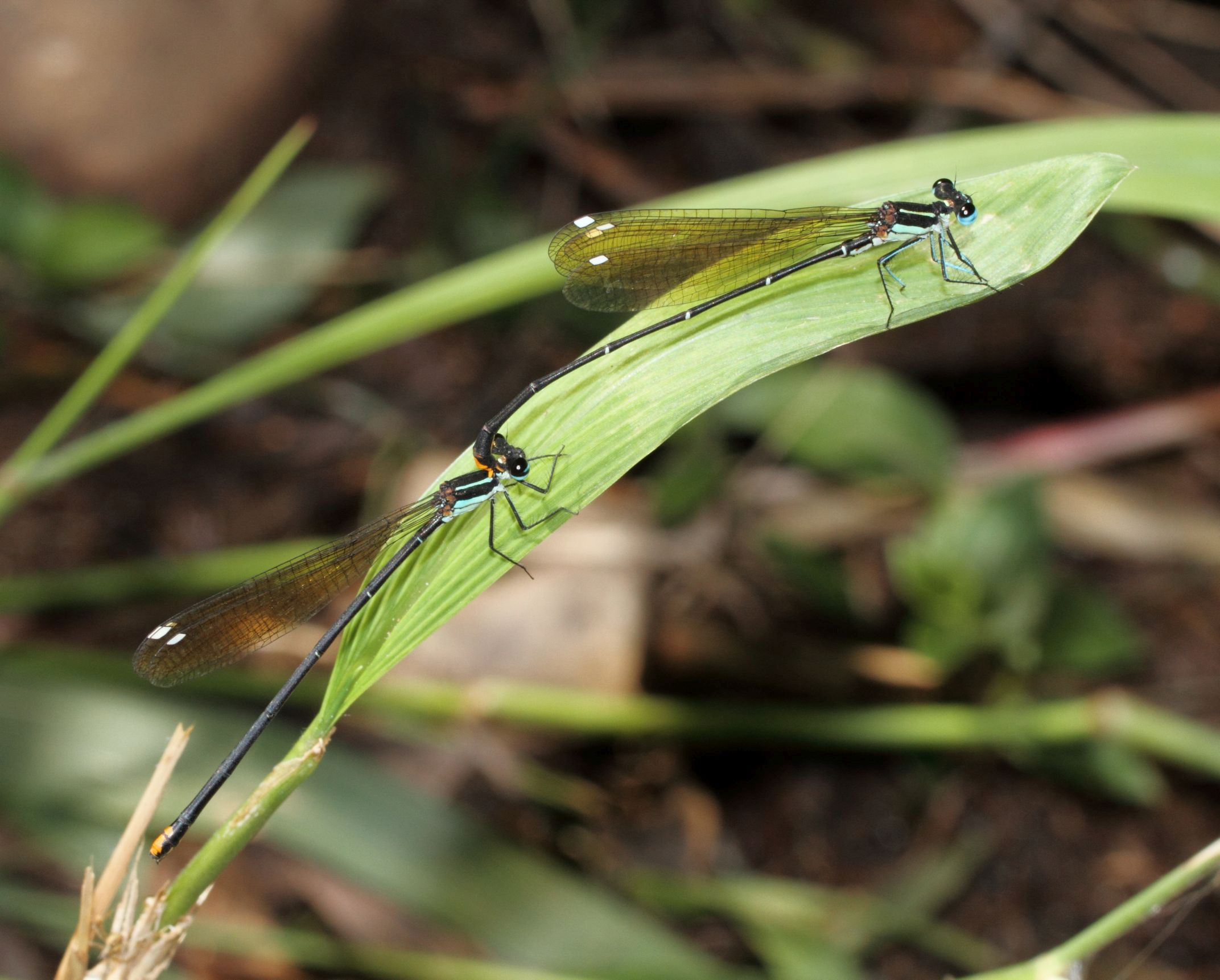
Mating pair, Pietermaritzburg
