= Allocnemis cyanura =

Conservation status
- Least Concern (IUCN 3.1)

Scientific classification
- Kingdom: Animalia
- Phylum: Arthropoda
- Class: Insecta
- Order: Odonata
- Suborder: Zygoptera
- Family: Platycnemididae
- Genus: Allocnemis
- Species: A. cyanura

Binomial name
- Allocnemis cyanura (Förster, 1909)

Species of damselfly

Allocnemis cyanura is a species of white-legged damselfly in the family Platycnemididae.

The IUCN conservation status of Allocnemis cyanura is "LC", least concern, with no immediate threat to the species' survival. The IUCN status was reviewed in 2010.
