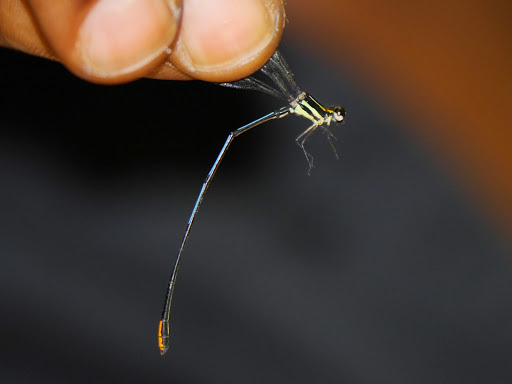

Conservation status
- Least Concern (IUCN 3.1)

Scientific classification
- Kingdom: Animalia
- Phylum: Arthropoda
- Clade: Pancrustacea
- Class: Insecta
- Order: Odonata
- Suborder: Zygoptera
- Family: Platycnemididae
- Genus: Allocnemis
- Species: A. nigripes

Binomial name
- Allocnemis nigripes (Selys, 1886)

= Allocnemis nigripes =

Species of damselfly

Allocnemis nigripes, formerly Chlorocnemis nigripes, is a species of white-legged damselfly in the family Platycnemididae. It is found in Cameroon, Central African Republic, the Democratic Republic of the Congo, Equatorial Guinea, Nigeria, and Uganda. Its natural habitats are subtropical or tropical moist lowland forests and freshwater springs.

The IUCN conservation status of Allocnemis nigripes is "LC", least concern, with no immediate threat to the species' survival. The IUCN status was reviewed in 2016.
