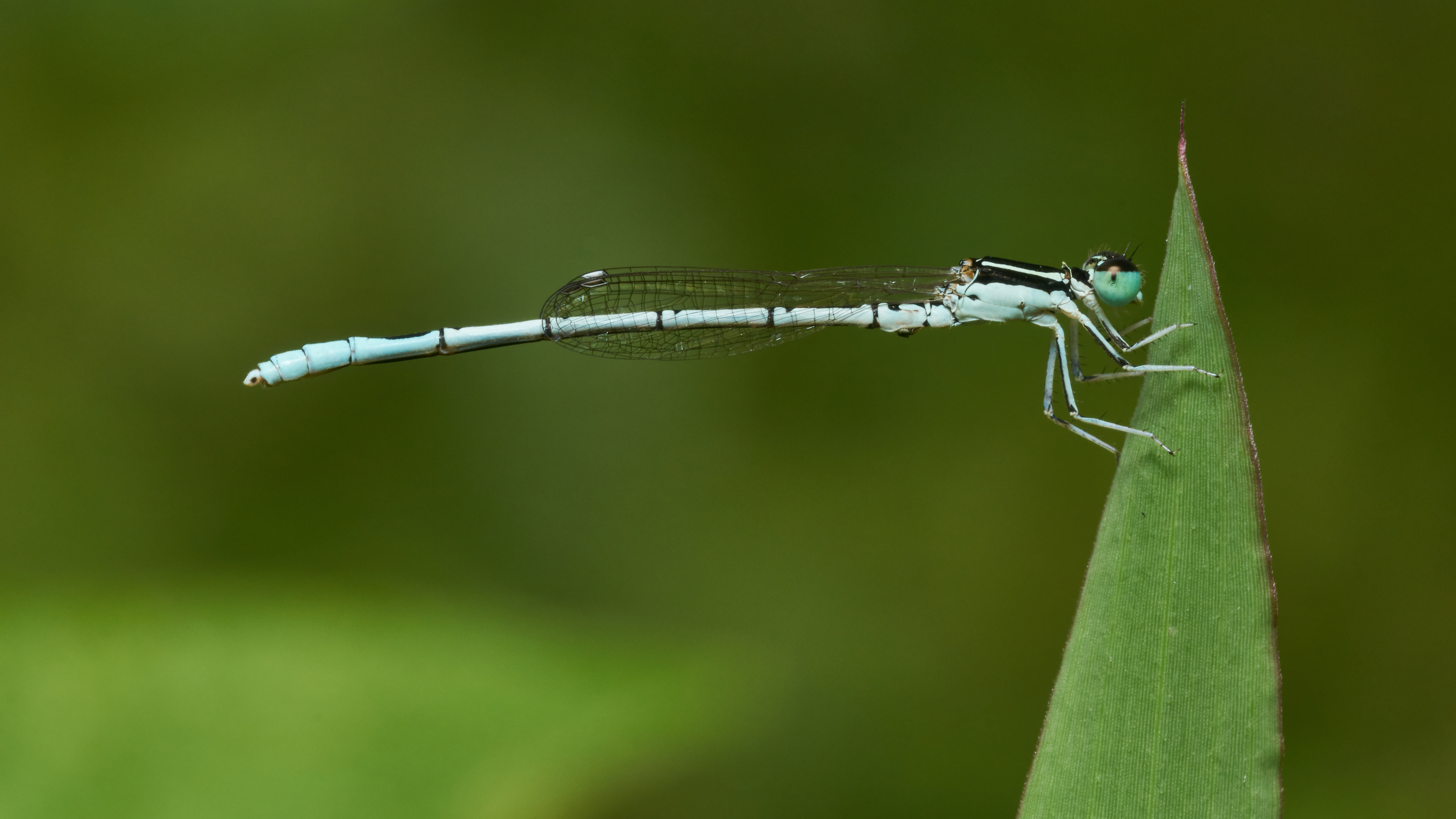
- Agriocnemis pieris, male

Scientific classification
- Kingdom: Animalia
- Phylum: Arthropoda
- Class: Insecta
- Order: Odonata
- Suborder: Zygoptera
- Family: Coenagrionidae
- Subfamily: Agriocnemidinae

Genera
- Agriocnemis; Argiocnemis; Austrocnemis; Coenagriocnemis; Mortonagrion

= Agriocnemidinae =

Subfamily of damselflies

The Agriocnemidinae are a subfamily of the Coenagrionidae family of damselflies. Damselflies in this subfamily are very small in size. The five genera contain 63 species.
