= Austrocnemis obscura =

Kimberley longlegs

Scientific classification
- Kingdom: Animalia
- Phylum: Arthropoda
- Clade: Pancrustacea
- Class: Insecta
- Order: Odonata
- Suborder: Zygoptera
- Family: Coenagrionidae
- Genus: Austrocnemis
- Species: A. obscura

Binomial name
- Austrocnemis obscura Theischinger & Watson, 1991

Species of damselfly

Austrocnemis obscura is a species of damselfly in the family Coenagrionidae, commonly known as a Kimberley longlegs. It is a tiny damselfly, bronze-black in colour with very long legs. It has only been recorded from the Kimberley region of Western Australia, where it inhabits streams and slow-moving water.

== Etymology ==
The genus name Austrocnemis combines austro- (Latin for "southern") with -cnemis, from Greek κνημίς (knēmis, "legging"), originally referring to leg structure.

The species name obscura is derived from the Latin obscurus ("dark"), in contrast to the more brightly coloured Austrocnemis splendida.

== Gallery ==
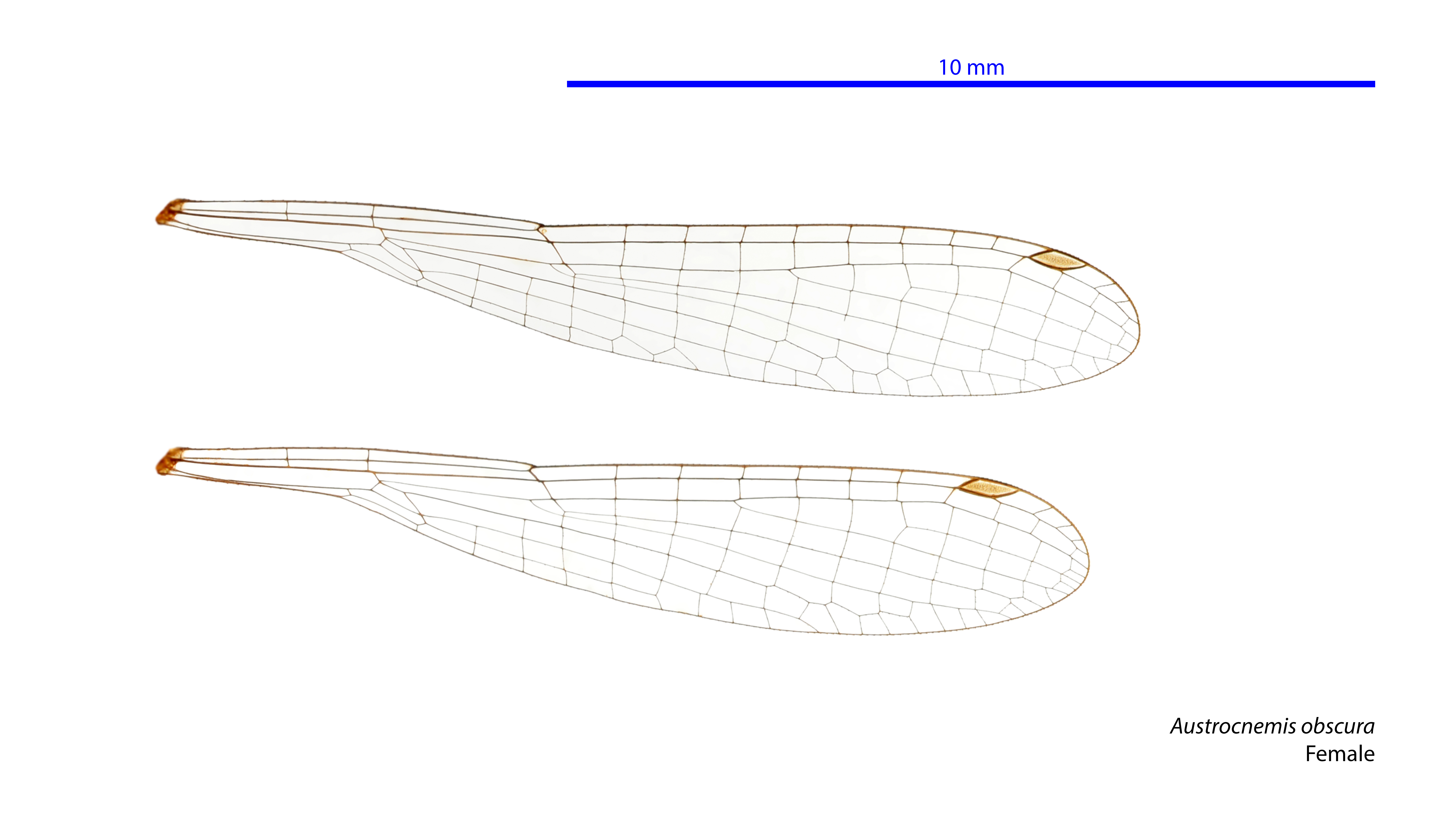
Female wings

== See also ==
- List of Odonata species of Australia
