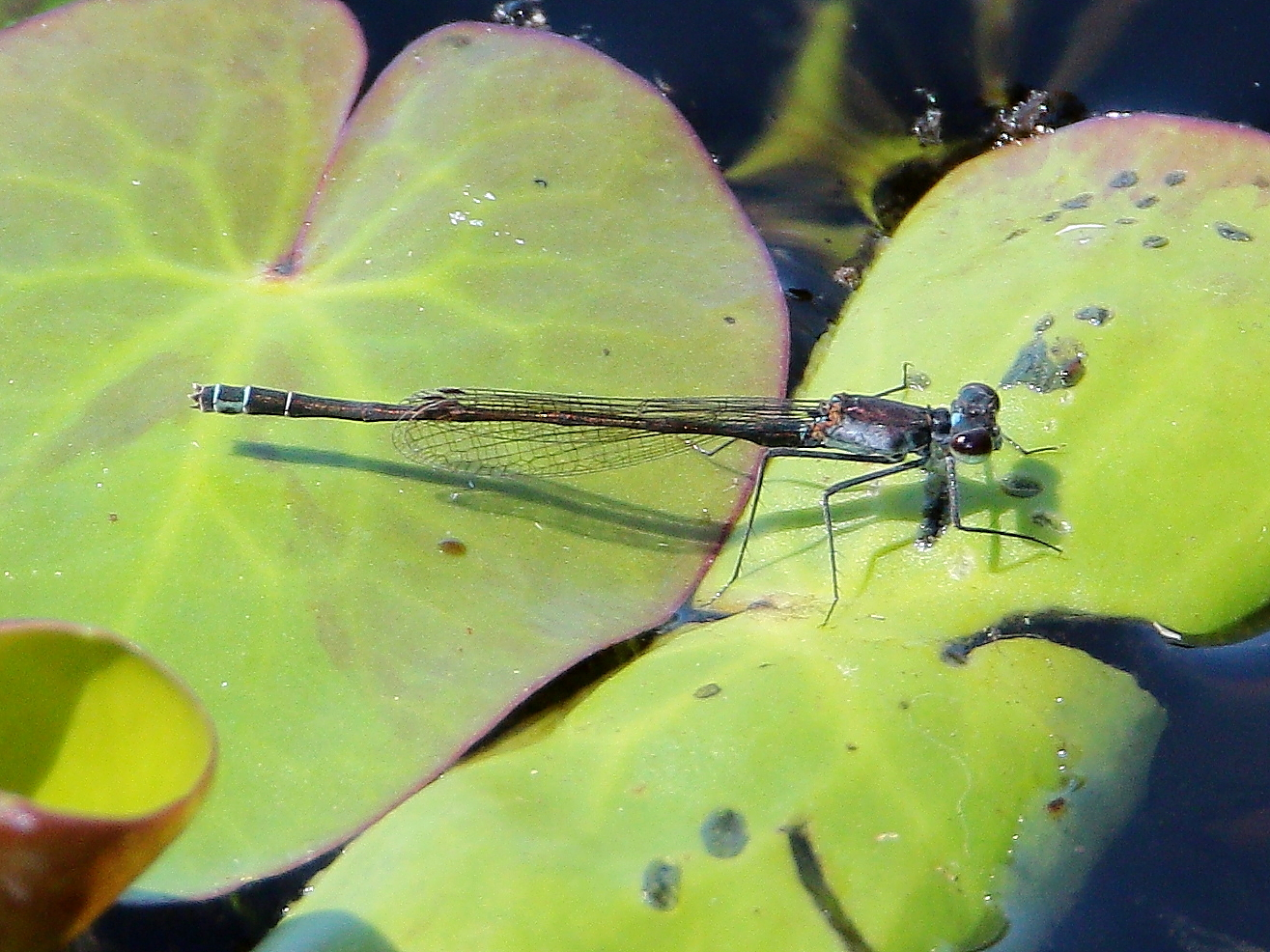
- Male tiny longlegs, Cairns
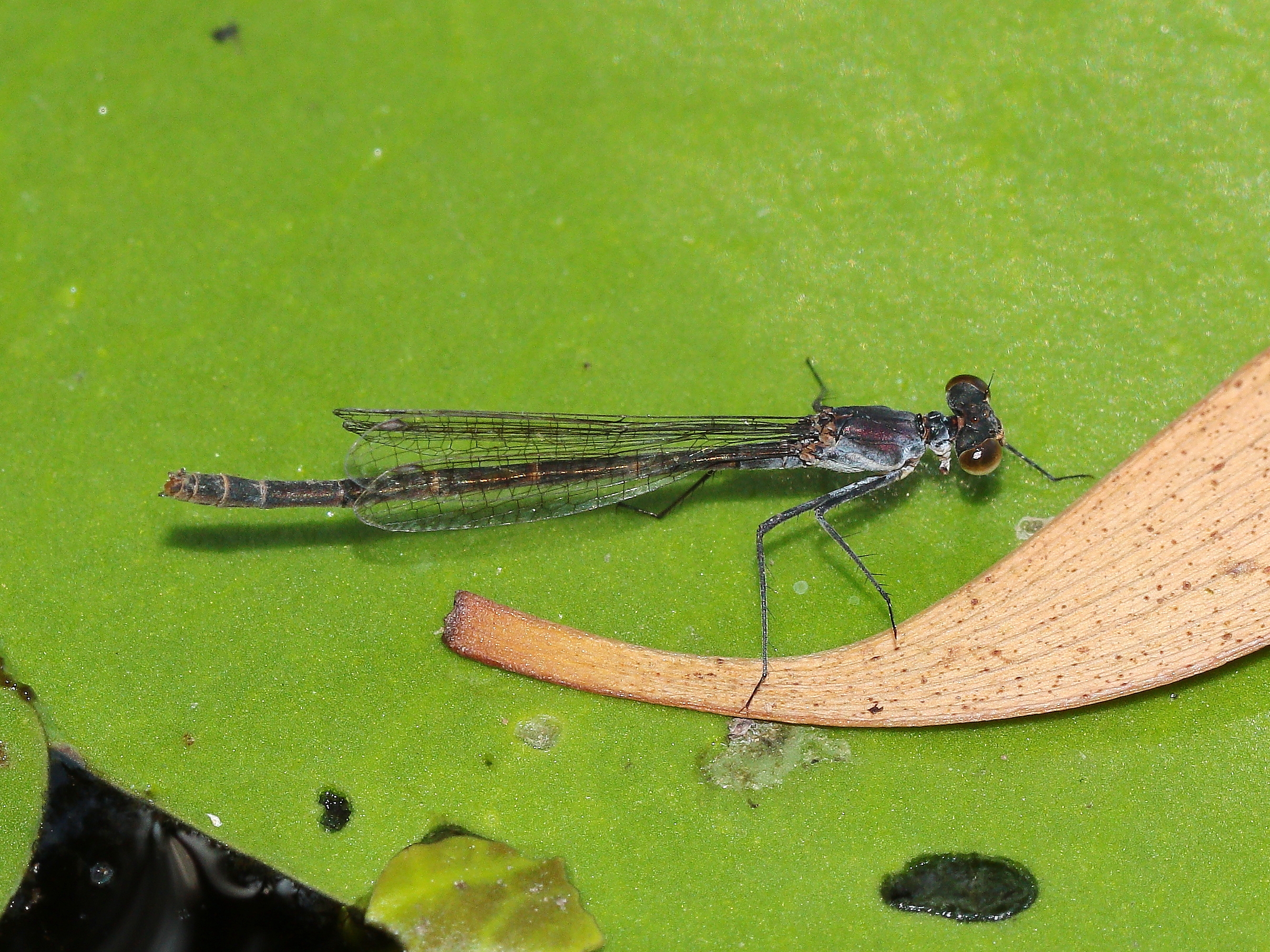
- Female, Cairns

Conservation status
- Least Concern (IUCN 3.1)

Scientific classification
- Kingdom: Animalia
- Phylum: Arthropoda
- Clade: Pancrustacea
- Class: Insecta
- Order: Odonata
- Suborder: Zygoptera
- Family: Coenagrionidae
- Genus: Austrocnemis
- Species: A. maccullochi

Binomial name
- Austrocnemis maccullochi (Tillyard, 1926)

Synonyms
- Agriocnemis maccullochi Tillyard, 1926

= Austrocnemis maccullochi =

Tiny longlegs

Species of damselfly

Austrocnemis maccullochi is a species of damselfly in the family Coenagrionidae, commonly known as a tiny longlegs. It is a tiny damselfly, bronze-black in colour with very long legs. It occurs across coastal northern Australia and New Guinea, where it inhabits still waters.

== Etymology ==
The genus name Austrocnemis combines austro- (Latin for "southern") with -cnemis, from Greek κνημίς (knēmis, "legging"), originally referring to leg structure.

In 1926, Robin Tillyard named this species maccullochi, an eponym honouring its collector, the late Allan Riverstone McCulloch (1885–1925), a noted systematic ichthyologist at the Australian Museum, Sydney.

== Gallery ==
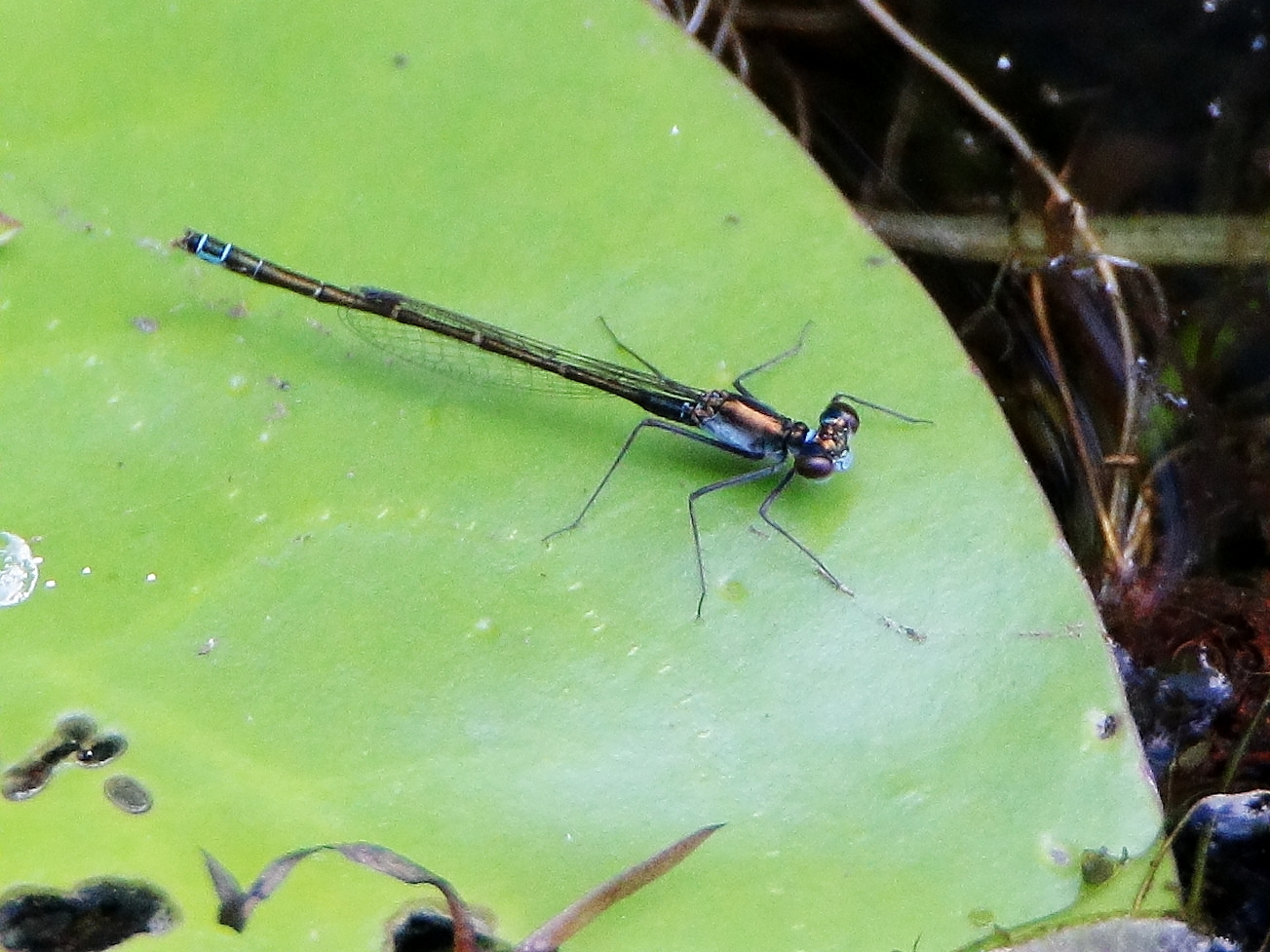
Male

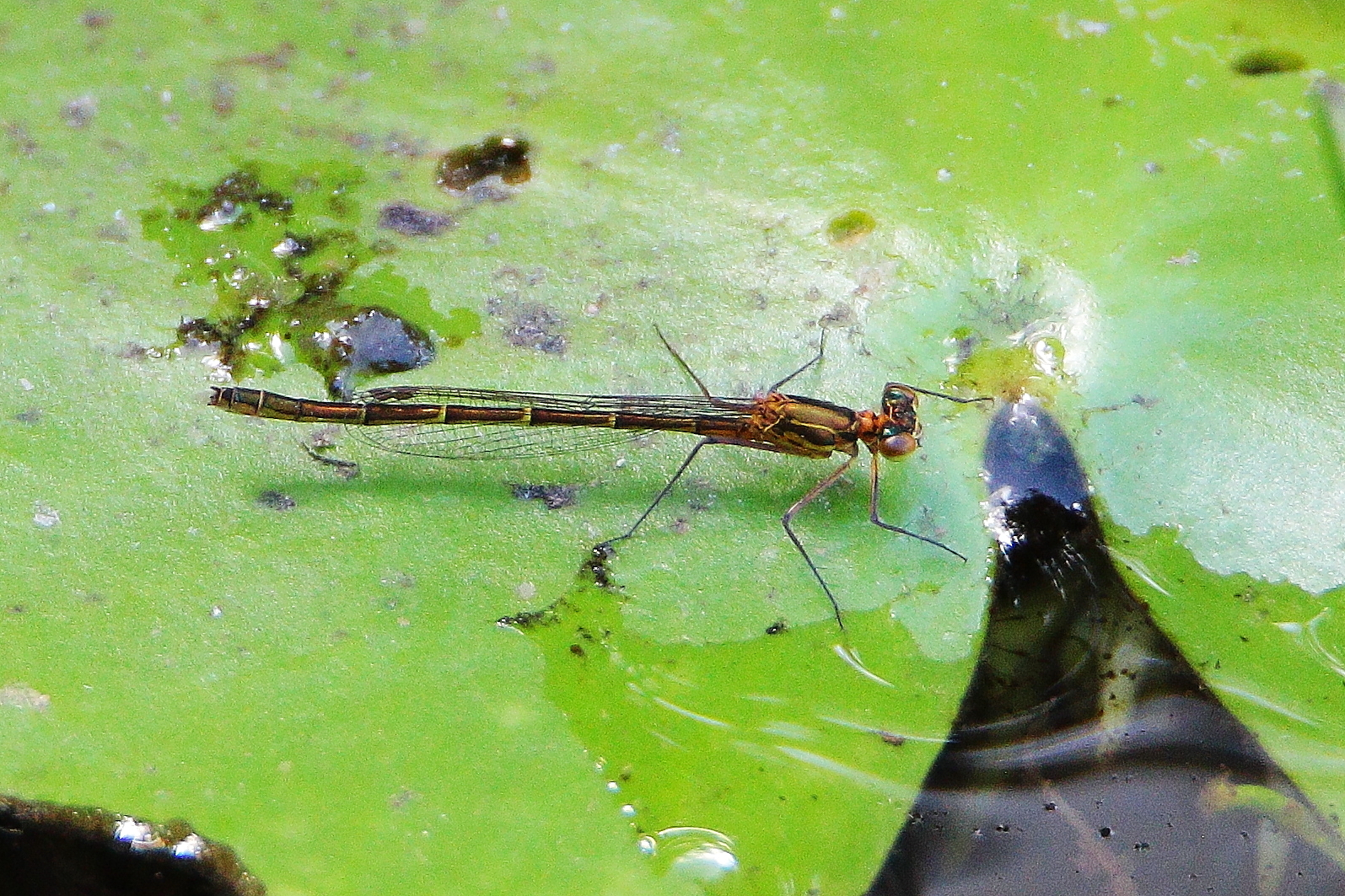
Female

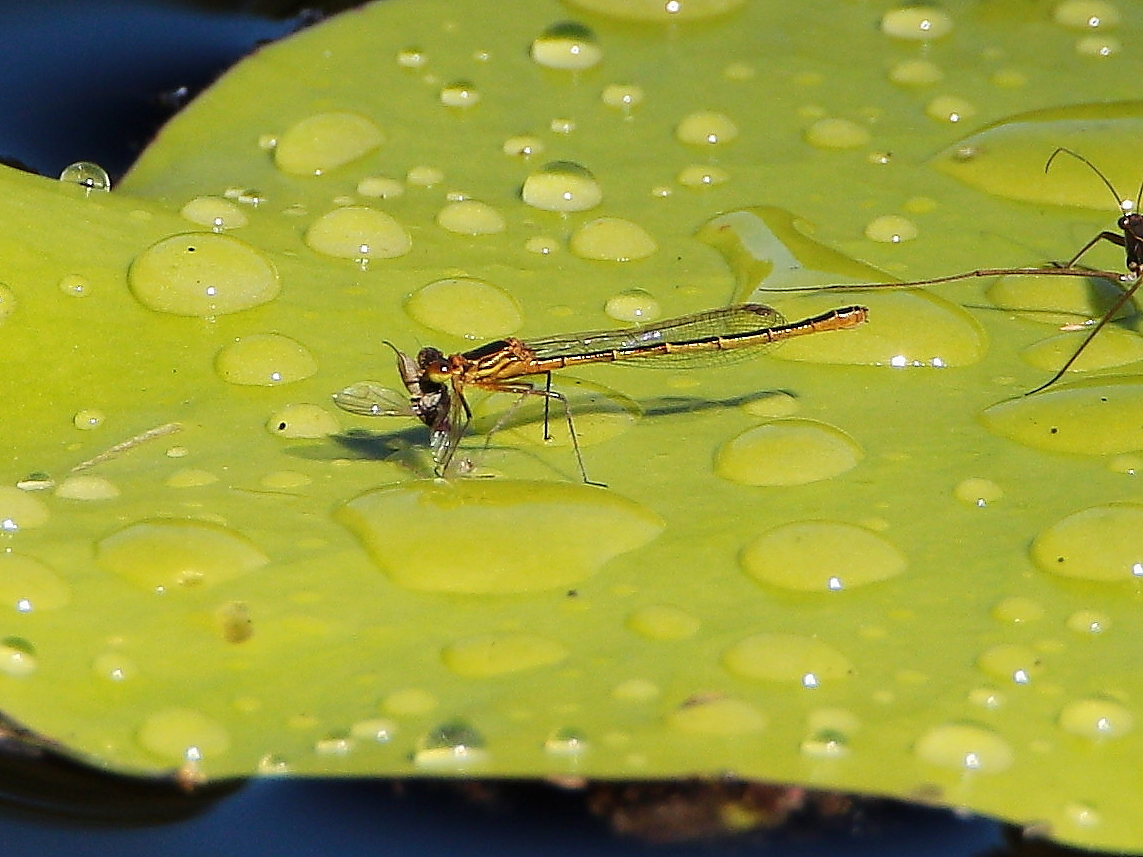
Female eating a fly

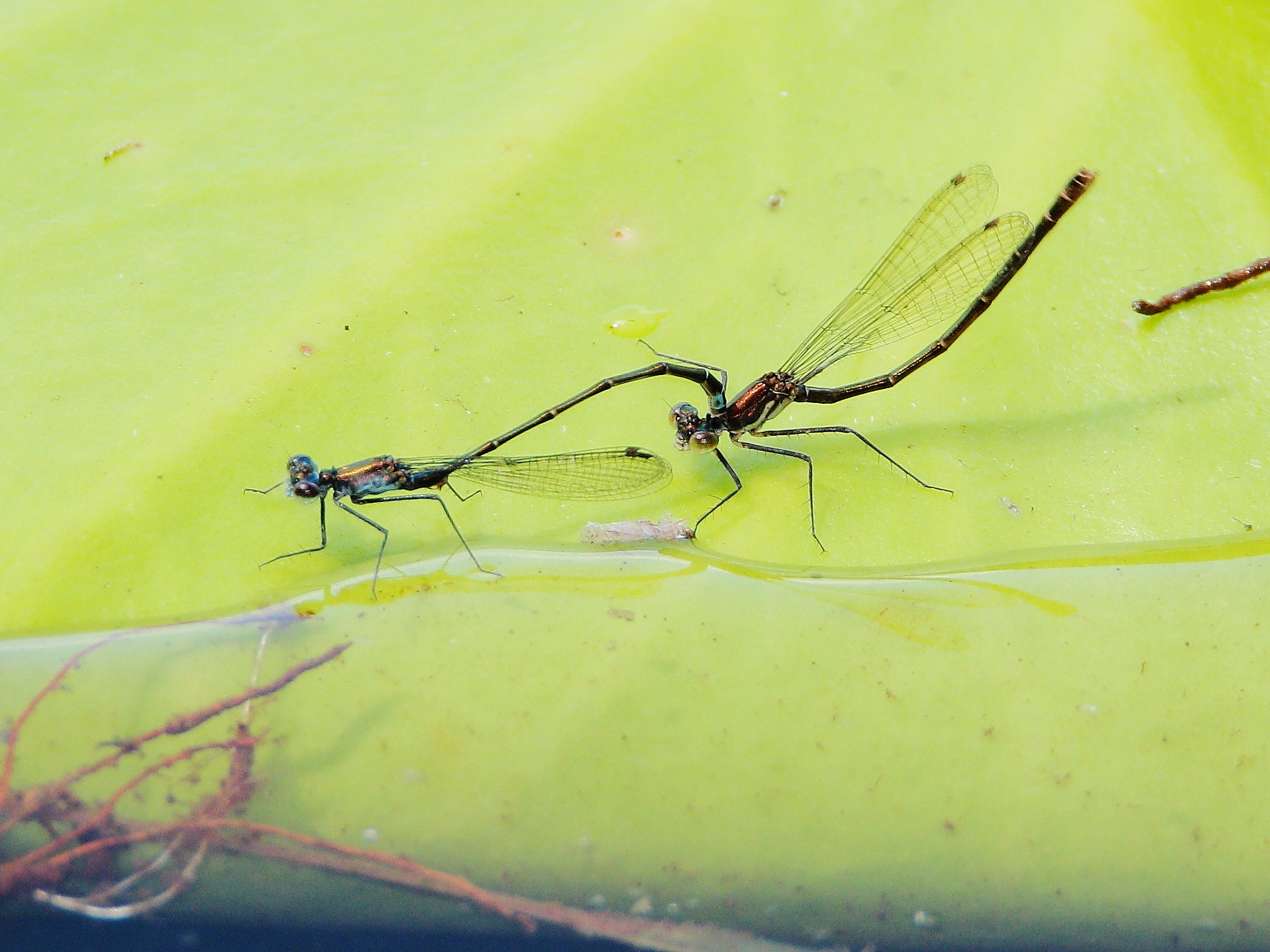
in copula

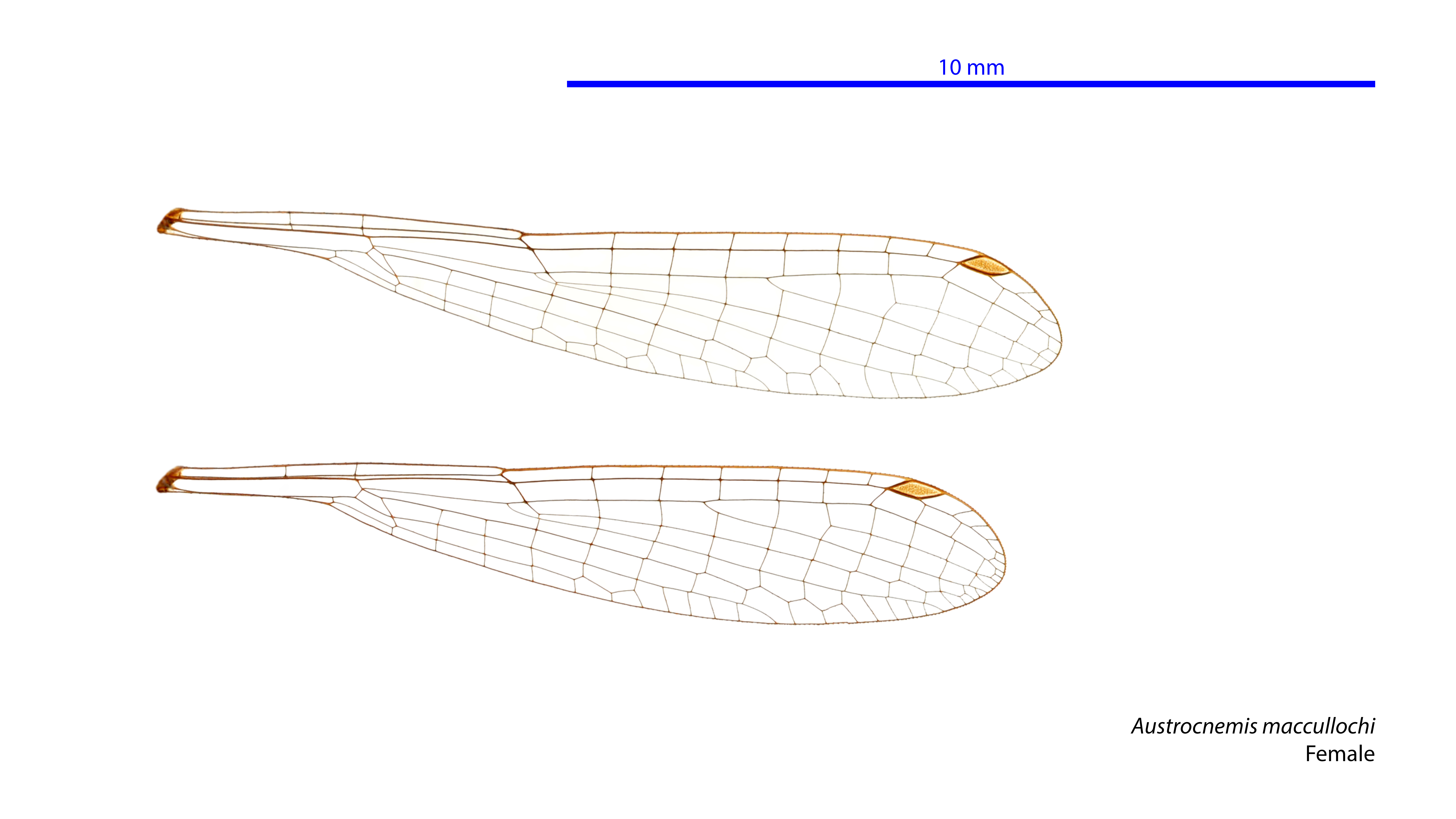
Female wings

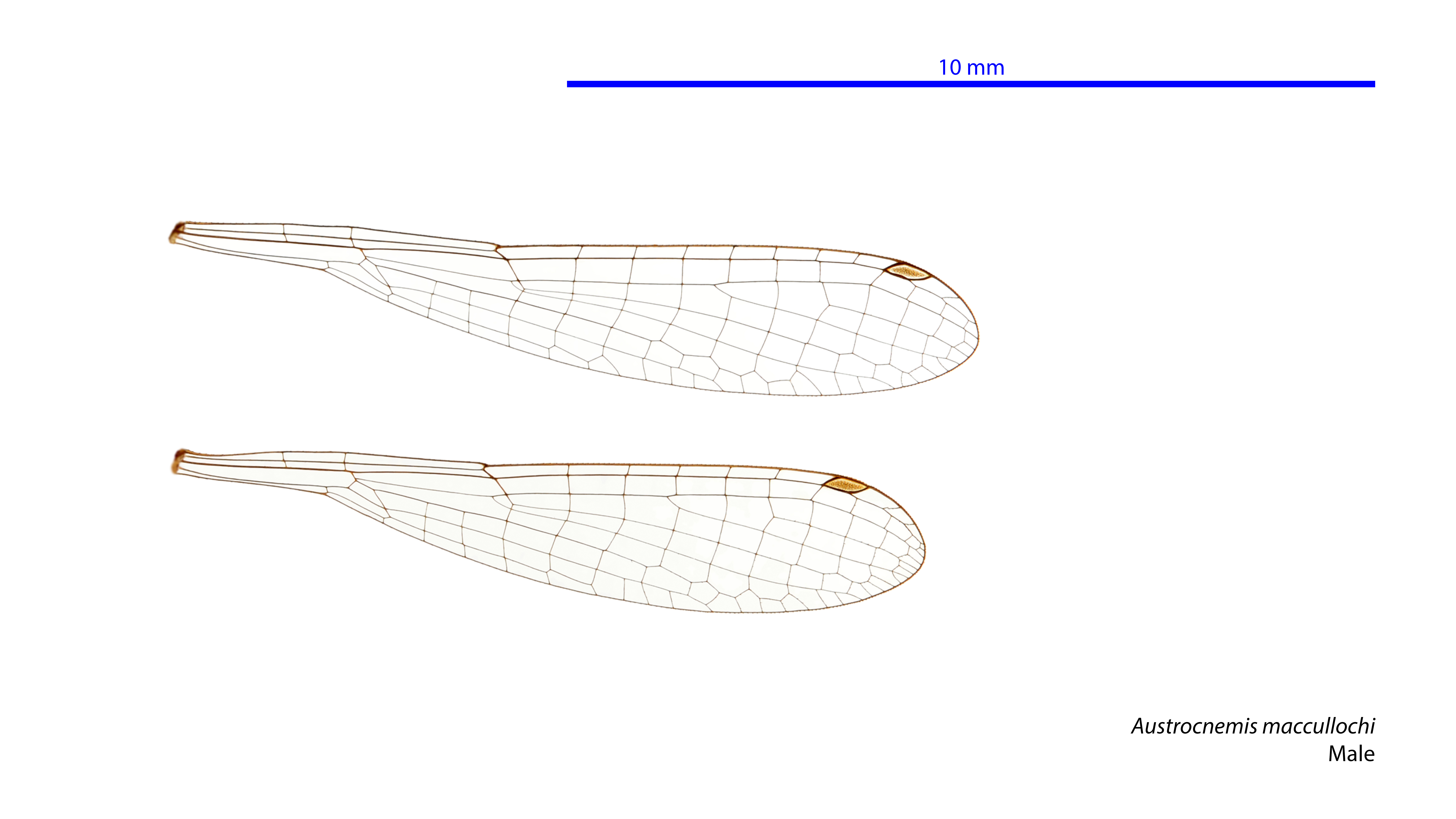
Male wings

== See also ==
- List of Odonata species of Australia
