= Coenagriocnemis insulare =

Conservation status
- Endangered (IUCN 3.1)

Scientific classification
- Domain: Eukaryota
- Kingdom: Animalia
- Phylum: Arthropoda
- Class: Insecta
- Order: Odonata
- Suborder: Zygoptera
- Family: Coenagrionidae
- Genus: Coenagriocnemis
- Species: C. insulare

Binomial name
- Coenagriocnemis insulare (Selys, 1872)

Species of damselfly

Coenagriocnemis insulare is a species of damselfly in the family Coenagrionidae. It is endemic to Mauritius. Its natural habitats are subtropical or tropical moist lowland forests and rivers. It is threatened by habitat loss.
