= Argiocnemis solitaria =

Conservation status
- Data Deficient (IUCN 3.1)

Scientific classification
- Domain: Eukaryota
- Kingdom: Animalia
- Phylum: Arthropoda
- Class: Insecta
- Order: Odonata
- Suborder: Zygoptera
- Family: Coenagrionidae
- Genus: Argiocnemis
- Species: A. solitaria

Binomial name
- Argiocnemis solitaria (Selys, 1872)

Species of damselfly

Argiocnemis solitaria is a species of damselfly in the family Coenagrionidae. It is endemic to Mauritius.

== Sources ==
- Clausnitzer, V. 2005. Argiocnemis solitaria. 2006 IUCN Red List of Threatened Species. Downloaded on 9 August 2007.
