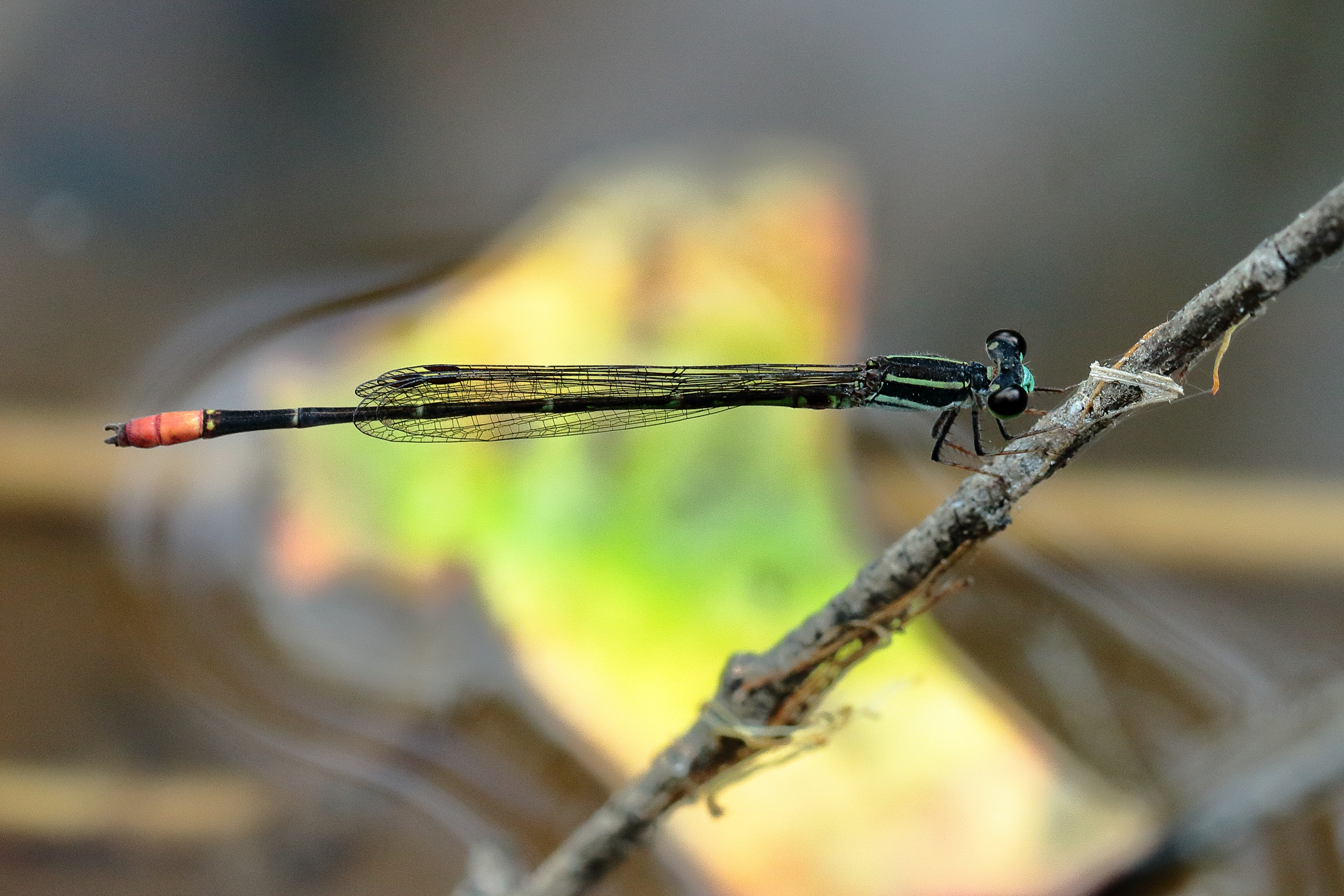
- Male, Queensland
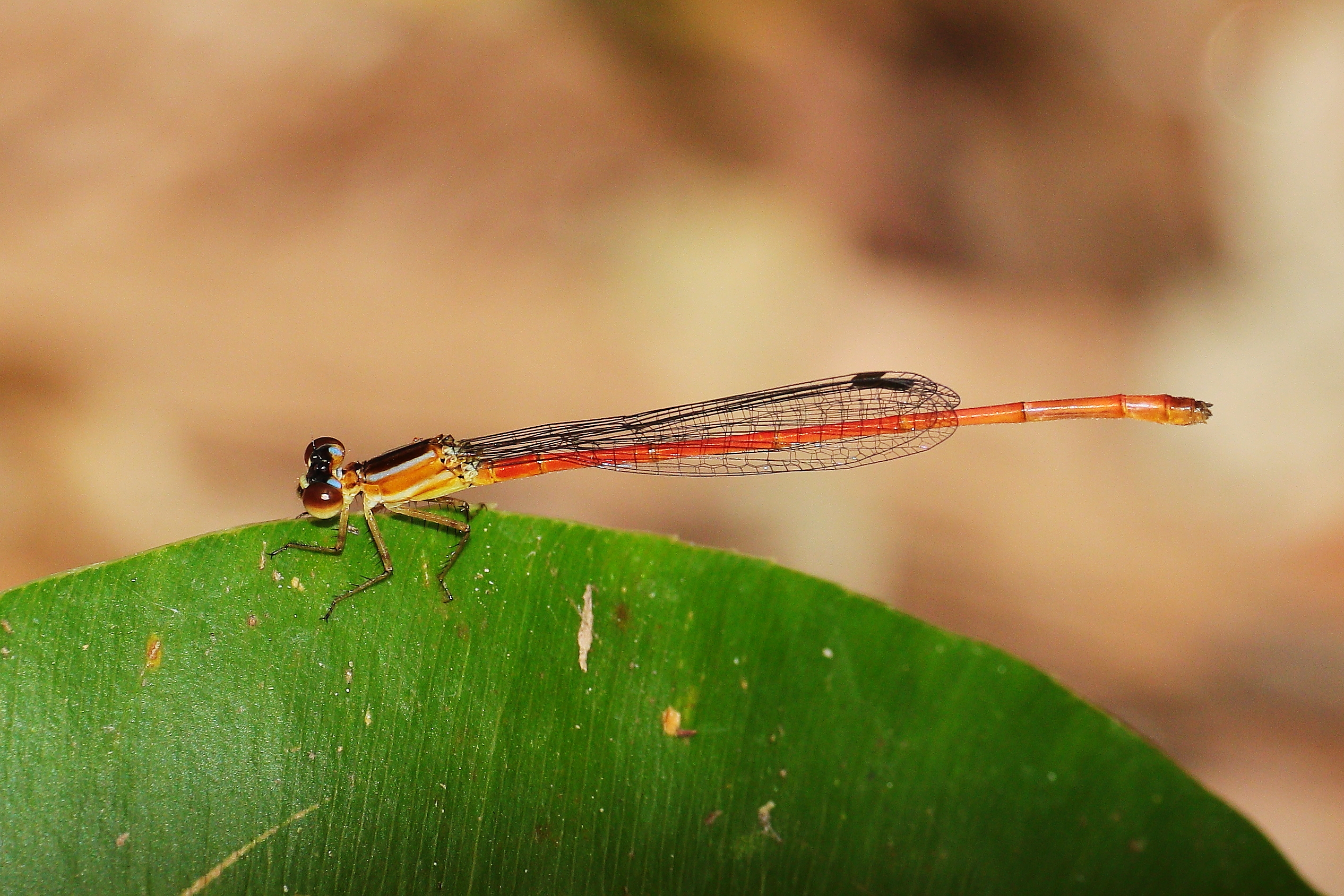
- Female

Conservation status
- Least Concern (IUCN 3.1)

Scientific classification
- Kingdom: Animalia
- Phylum: Arthropoda
- Clade: Pancrustacea
- Class: Insecta
- Order: Odonata
- Suborder: Zygoptera
- Family: Coenagrionidae
- Genus: Argiocnemis
- Species: A. rubescens

Binomial name
- Argiocnemis rubescens Selys, 1877

Synonyms
- Argiocnemis lunulata Selys, 1877; Argiocnemis nigricans Selys, 1877; Argiocnemis rubeola Selys, 1877; Argiocnemis sumatrana Krüger, 1898

= Argiocnemis rubescens =

Species of damselfly

Argiocnemis rubescens is a species of damselfly in the family Coenagrionidae, commonly known as the red-tipped shadefly. It is a widespread species extending from India to southern China, south-east Asia, New Guinea and Australia.

Argiocnemis rubescens prefers fresh still waters such as pools, marshes and swamps. The adult is a small to medium-sized damselfly with a length of 35 to 40mm, and the hindwing less than 22mm. When immature it is a pale reddish brown. The mature male is dark with pale green stripes on the thorax, and red on segments 8 and 9. In Australia, the distribution is in suitable habitat from Shark Bay in the west, across the north of the continent, to about Point Hicks in the south-east. The taxon has been assessed in the IUCN Red List as least concern.

== Etymology ==
The genus name Argiocnemis is derived from -cnemis, from the Greek κνημίς (knēmis, "greave" or "legging"), a suffix commonly used in damselfly names, and a prefix Argio- of uncertain origin, possibly from the Greek ἀργία (argia, "idleness" or "leisure") or formed as an anagram of Agrio-, based on the genus Agrion.

The species name rubescens is Latin for "becoming red" or "blushing". Edmond de Sélys Longchamps named this species of damselfly for the colour of the upper surface of its abdomen.

== Gallery ==
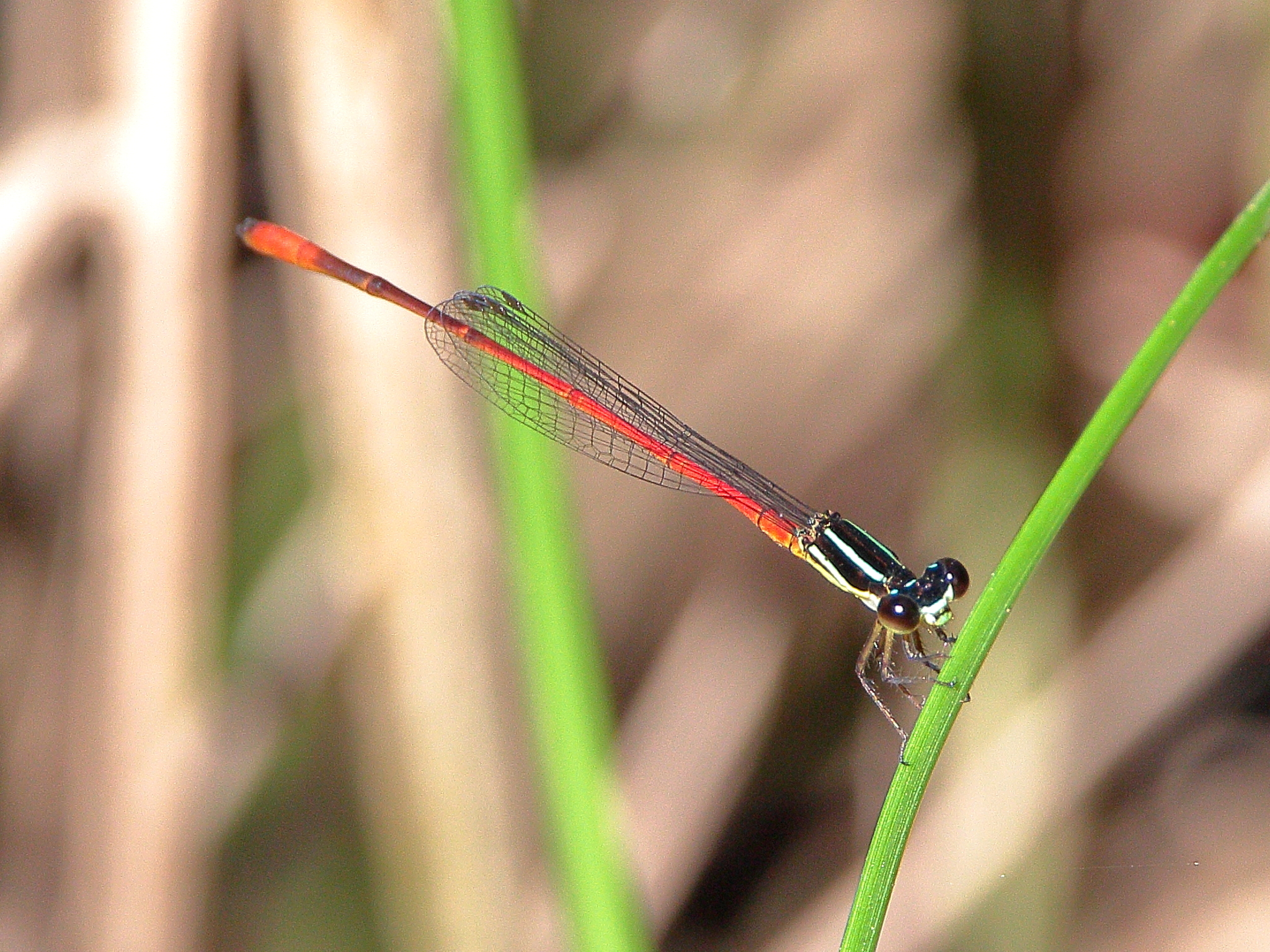
Young male

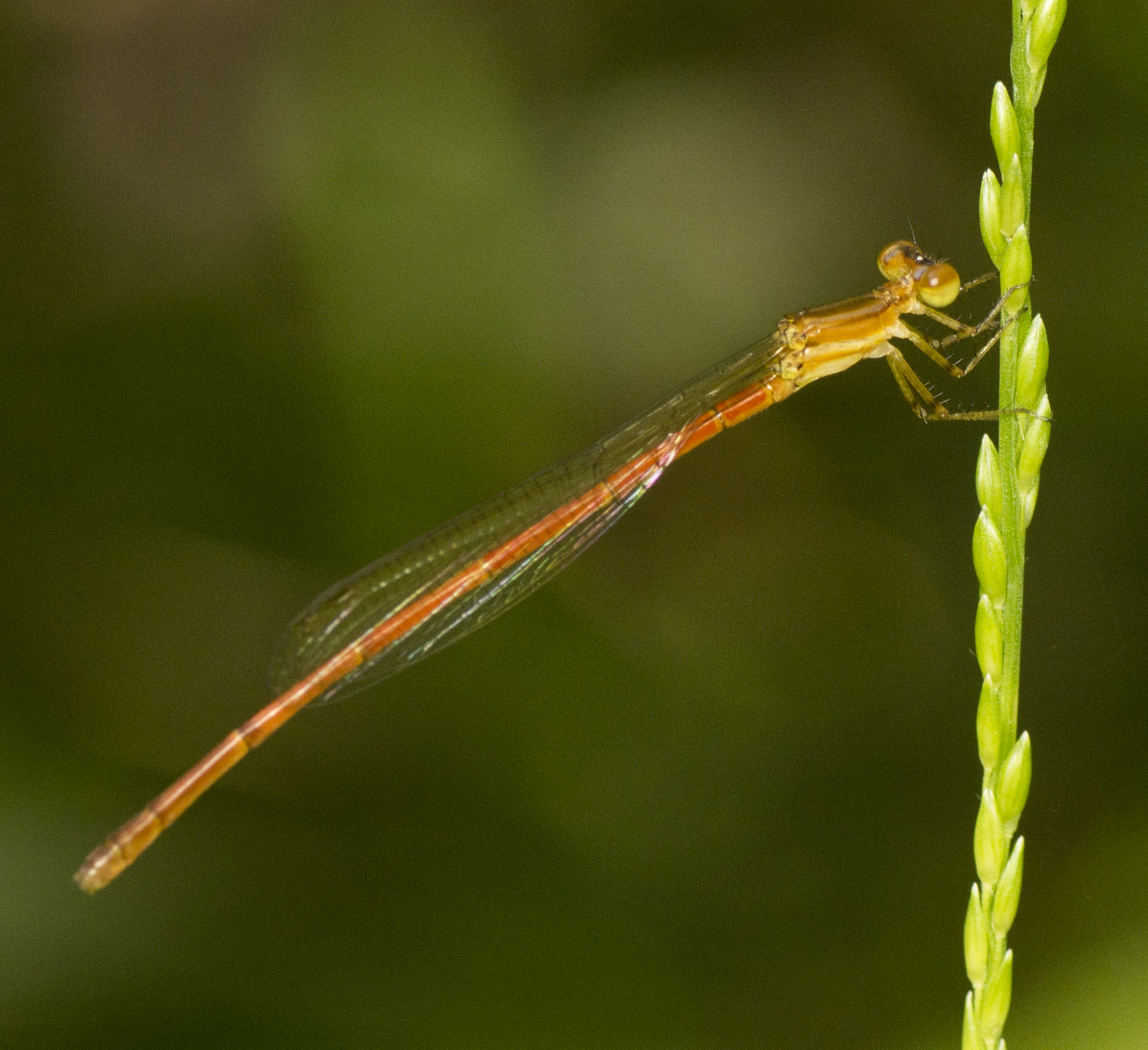
Young female

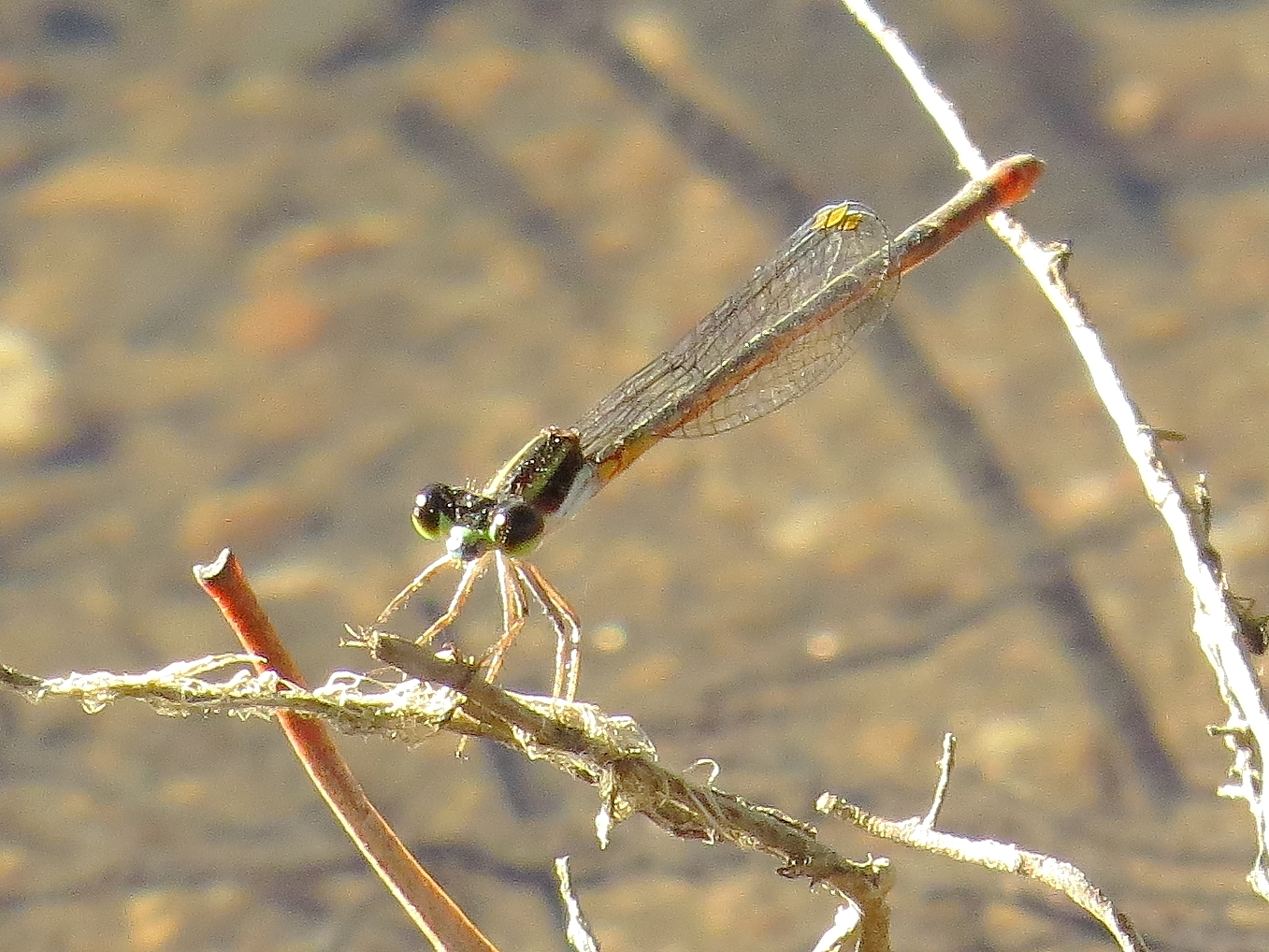
Female

Illustration of wing with inset depicting the anal vein (1A) leaving the margin on the basal side of the anal crossing vein (Ac). This is a characteristic of the genus.

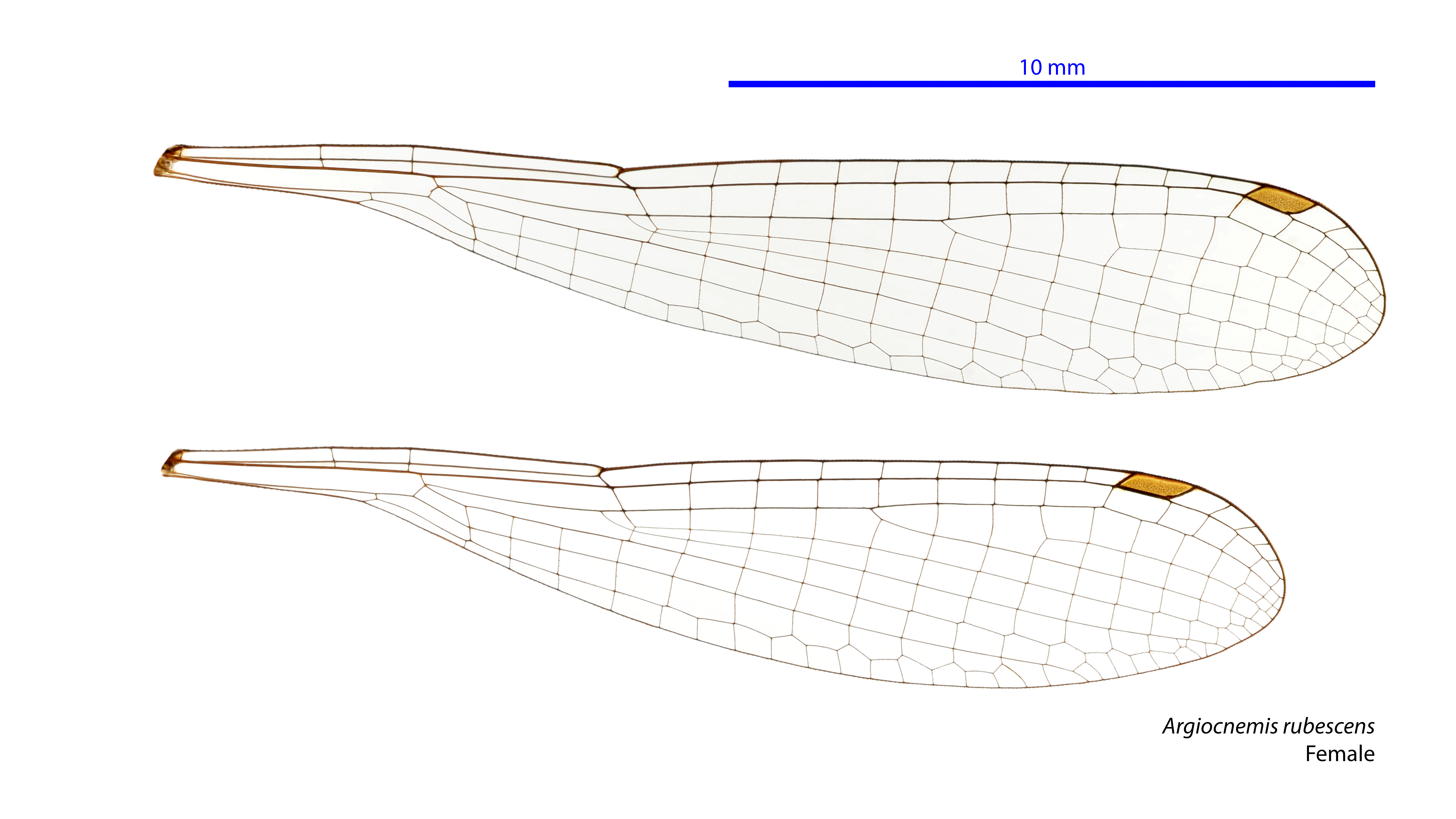
Photo of female wings

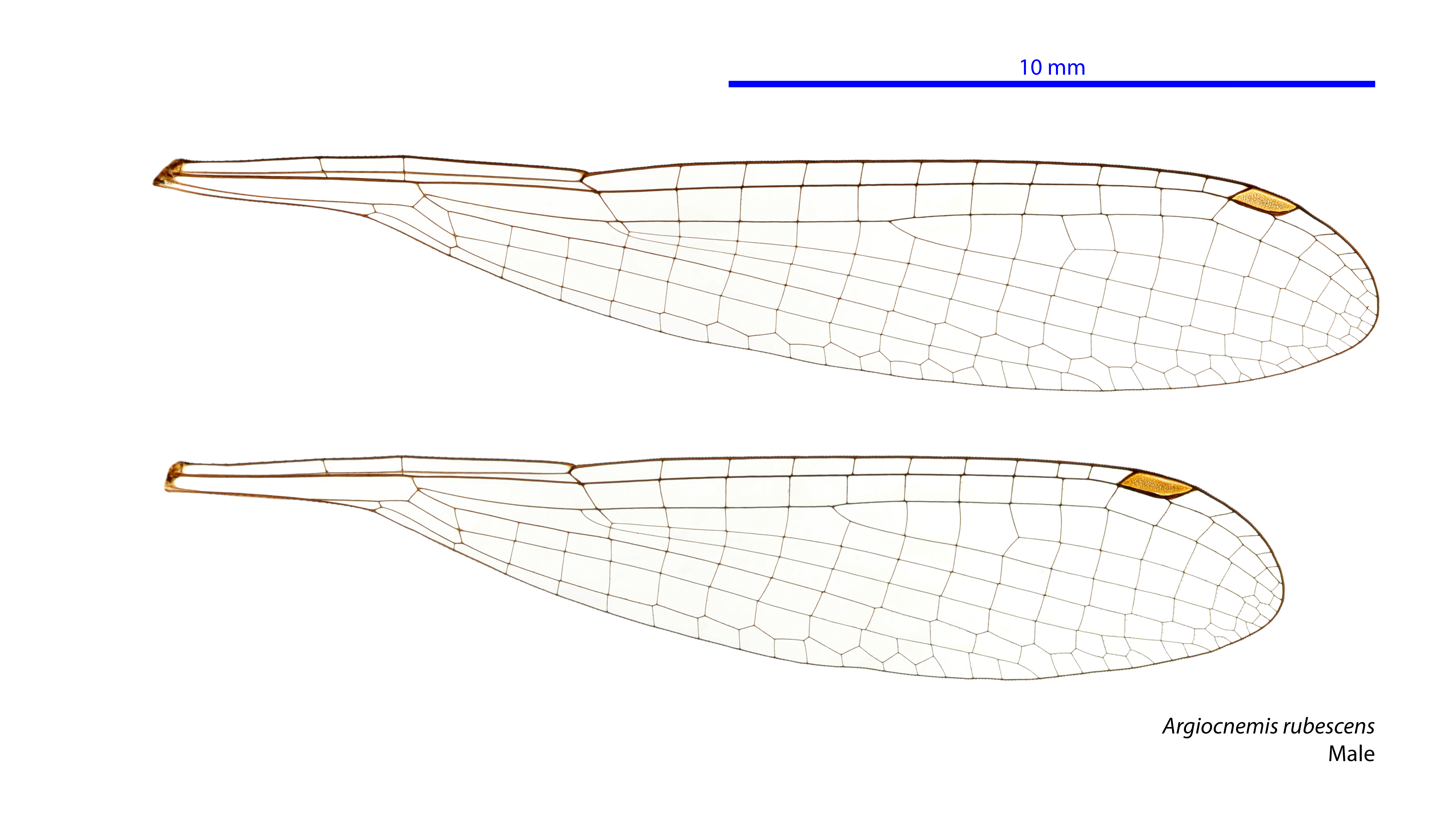
Photo of male wings
