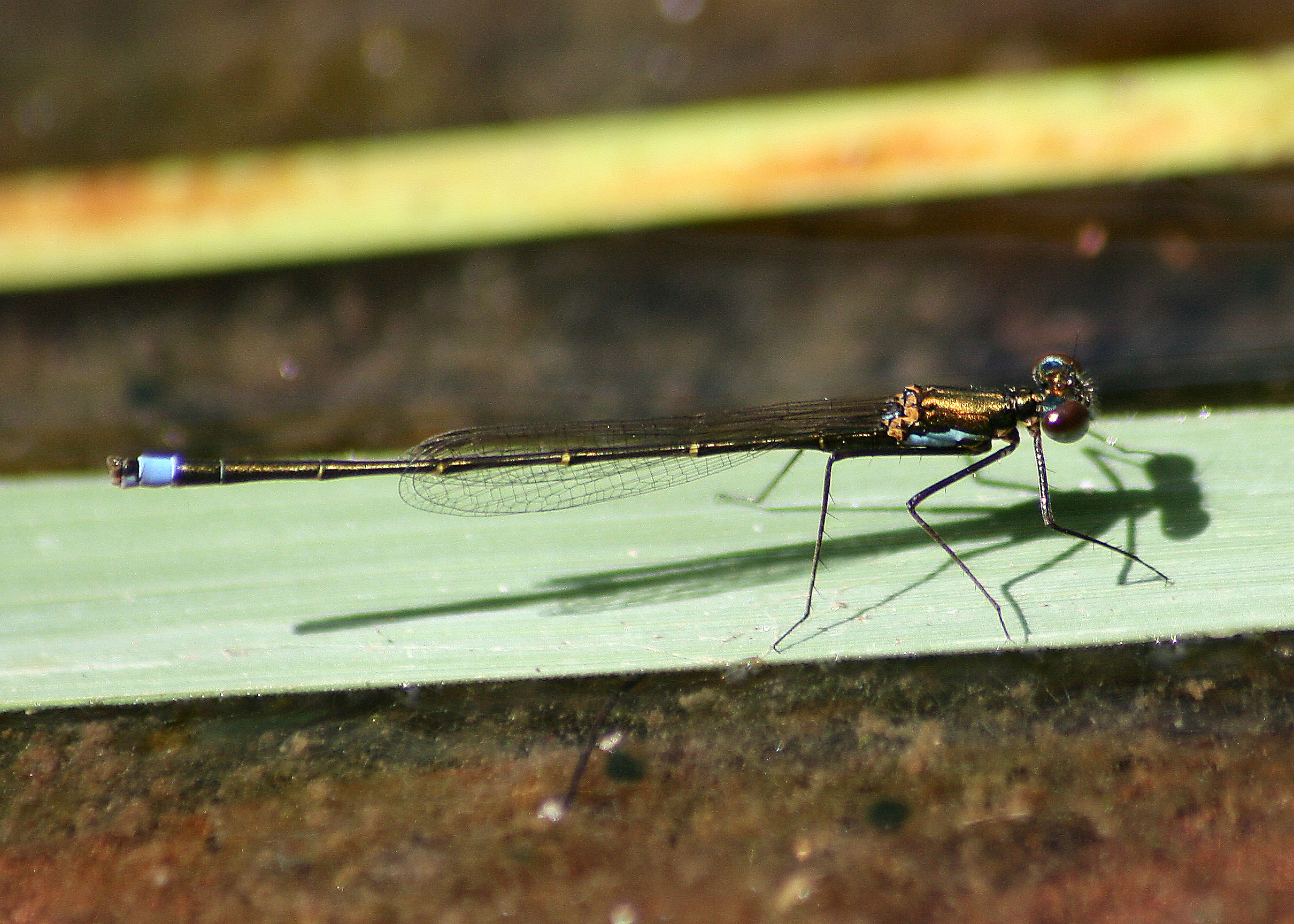
- Male
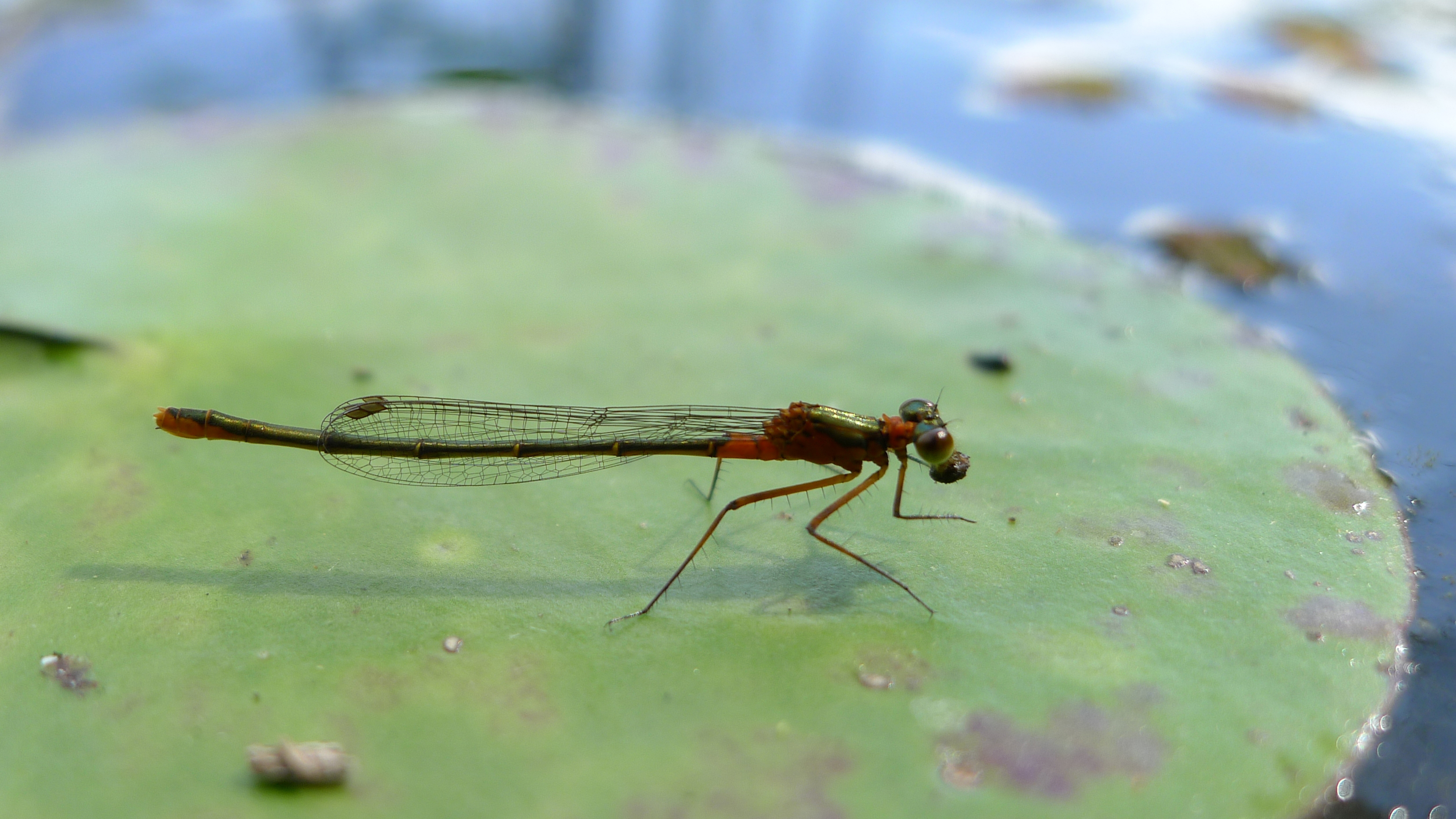
- Female

Conservation status
- Least Concern (IUCN 3.1)

Scientific classification
- Kingdom: Animalia
- Phylum: Arthropoda
- Clade: Pancrustacea
- Class: Insecta
- Order: Odonata
- Suborder: Zygoptera
- Family: Coenagrionidae
- Genus: Austrocnemis
- Species: A. splendida

Binomial name
- Austrocnemis splendida (Martin, 1901)

Synonyms
- Agriocnemis splendida Martin, 1901

= Austrocnemis splendida =

Splendid longlegs

Species of damselfly

Austrocnemis splendida is a species of damselfly in the family Coenagrionidae, commonly known as a splendid longlegs.

Austrocnemis splendida is a tiny damselfly, bronze-black in colour with very long legs. Males have a blue patch on each side of their body and a pale blue tail band; females have red on their body with no tail band. It is found in eastern Australia, where it inhabits streams and slow-moving water. It is commonly found sitting flat on a waterlily or other floating leaf.

== Etymology ==
The genus name Austrocnemis combines austro- (Latin for "southern") with -cnemis, from Greek κνημίς (knēmis, "legging"), originally referring to leg structure.

The species name splendida is derived from the Latin splendidus ("bright"), referring to its bright green and bronze colouring.

== Gallery ==
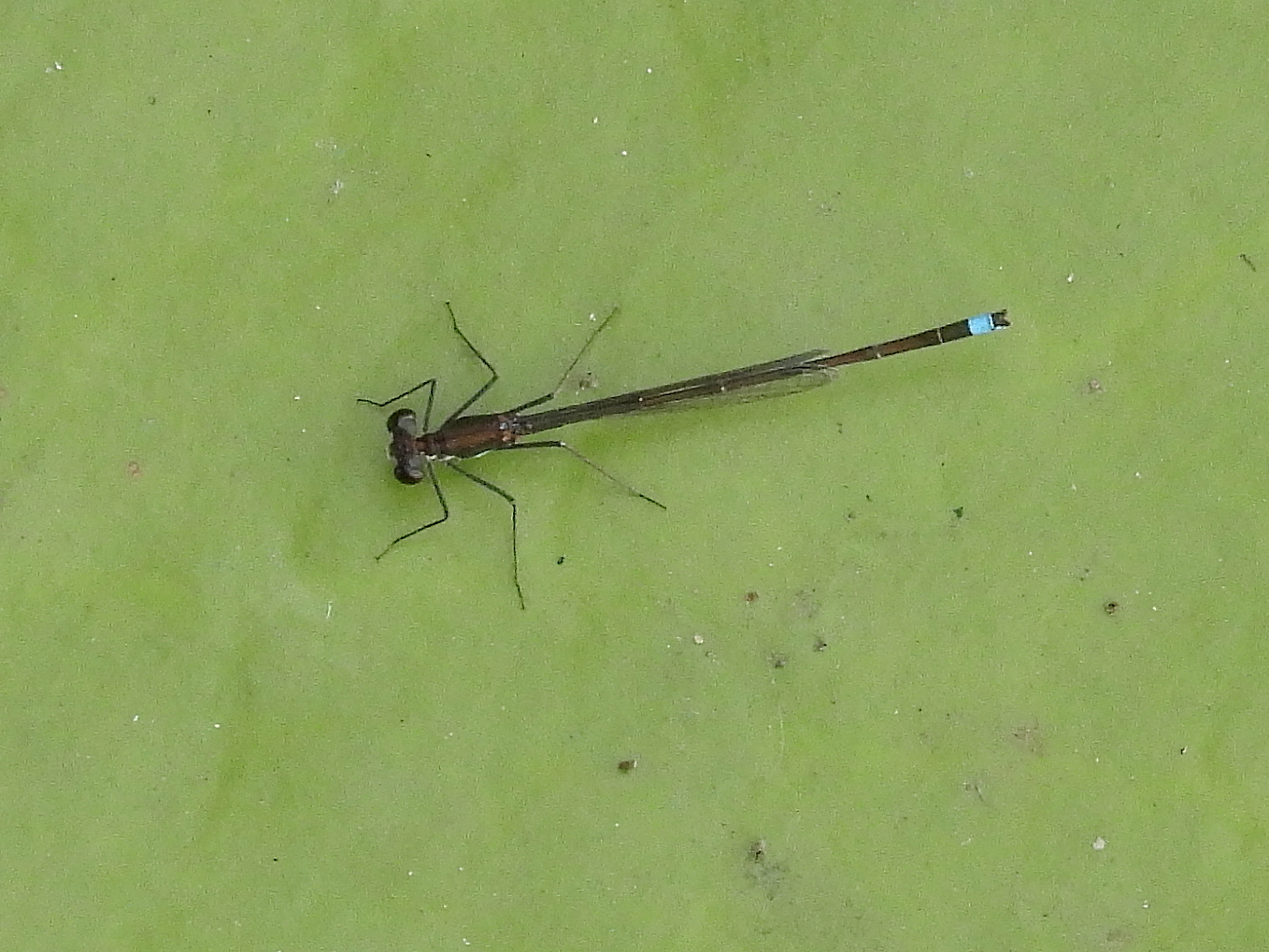
Male

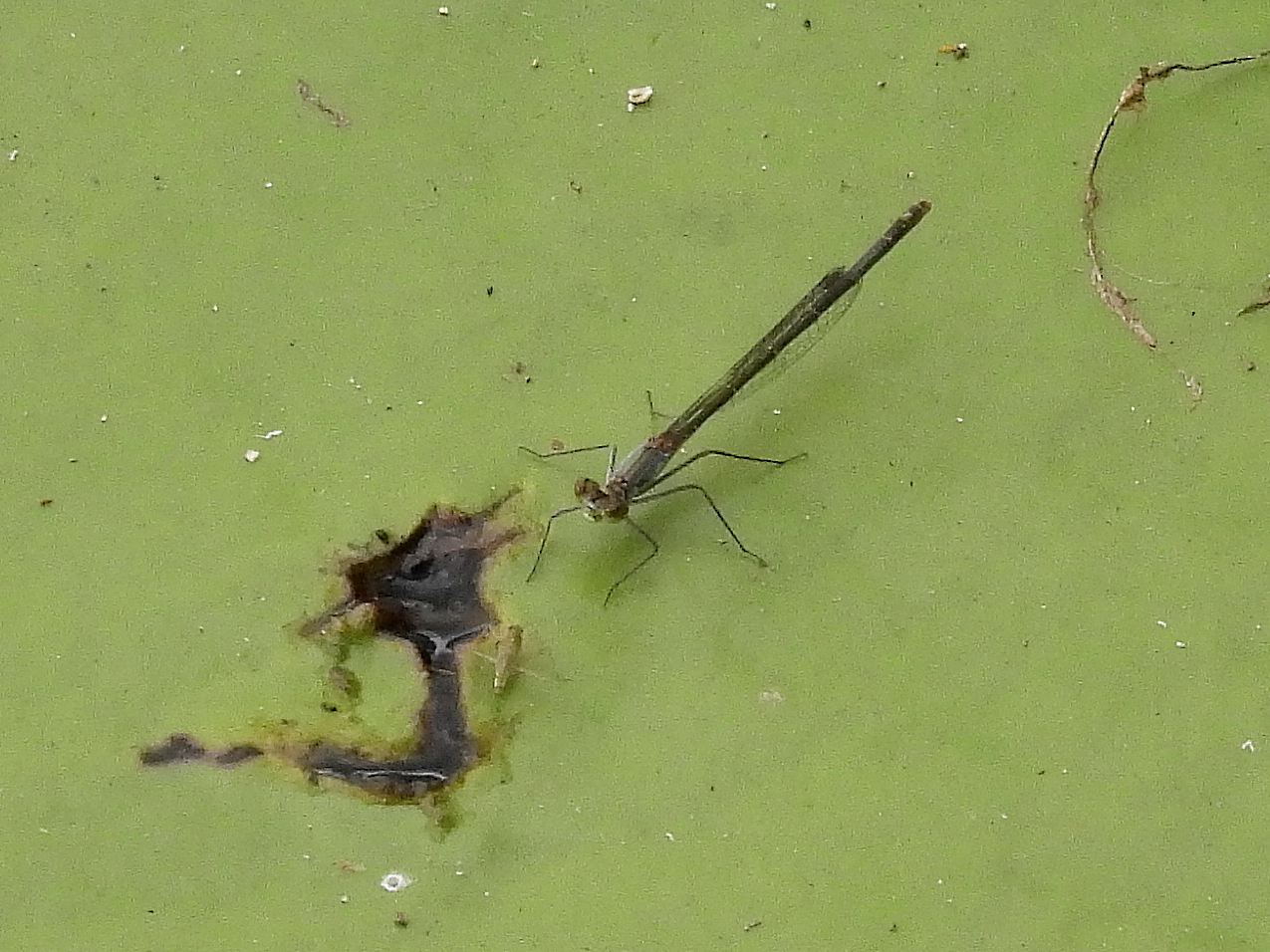
Female

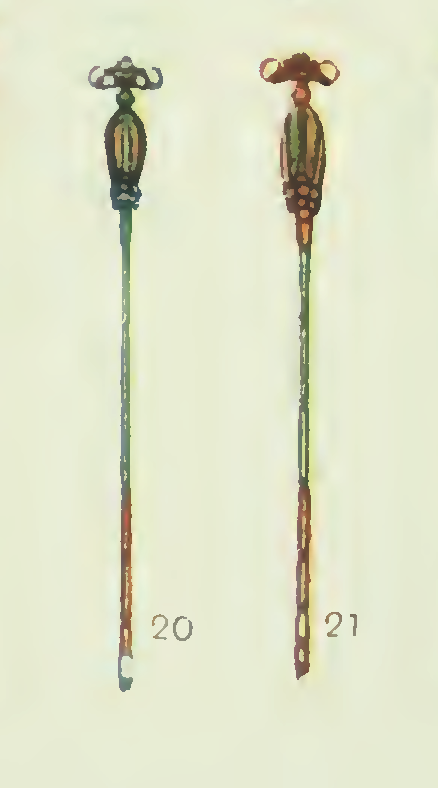
Fig 20. Male; Fig 21. Rufous form of female

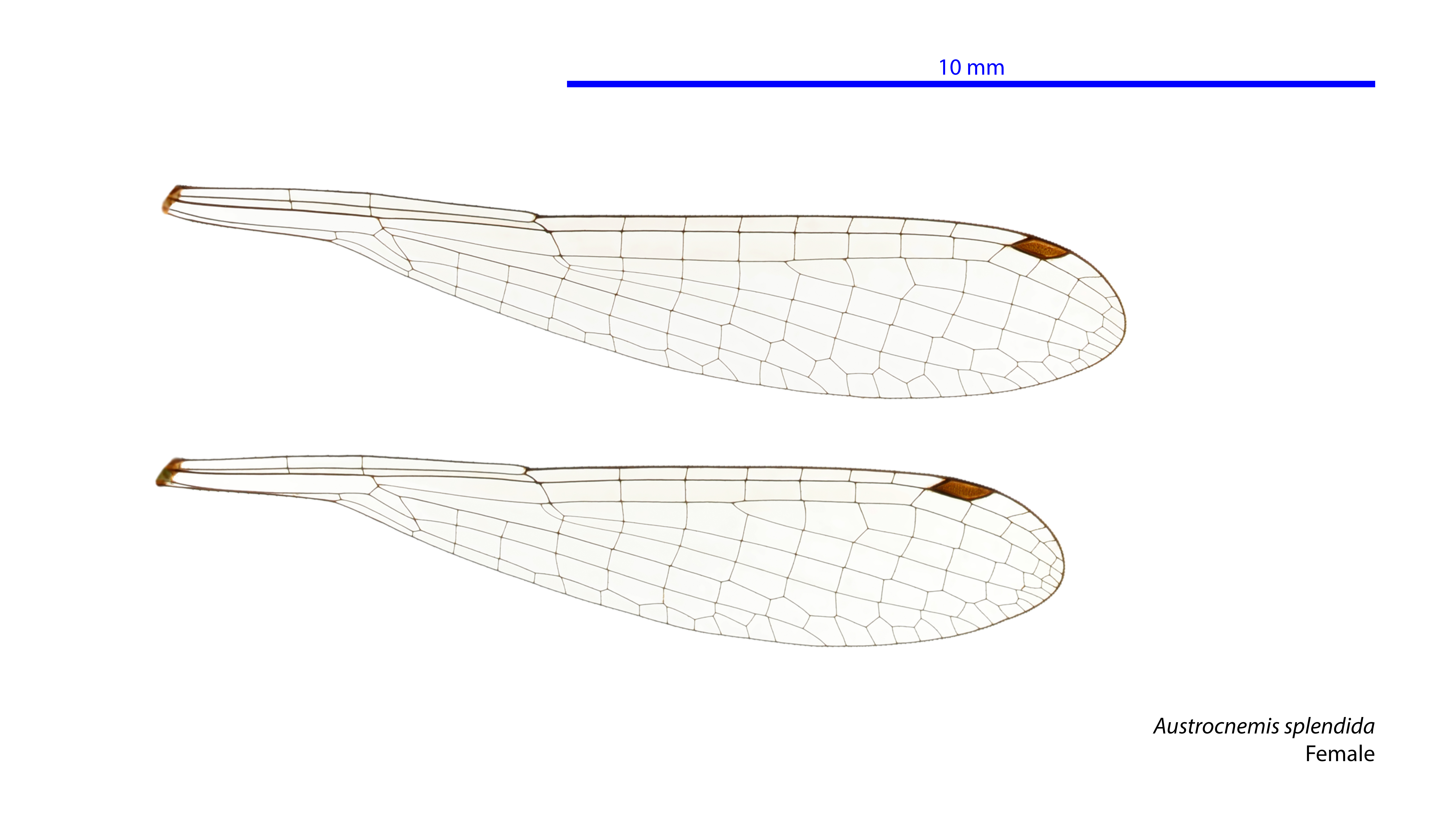
Female wings

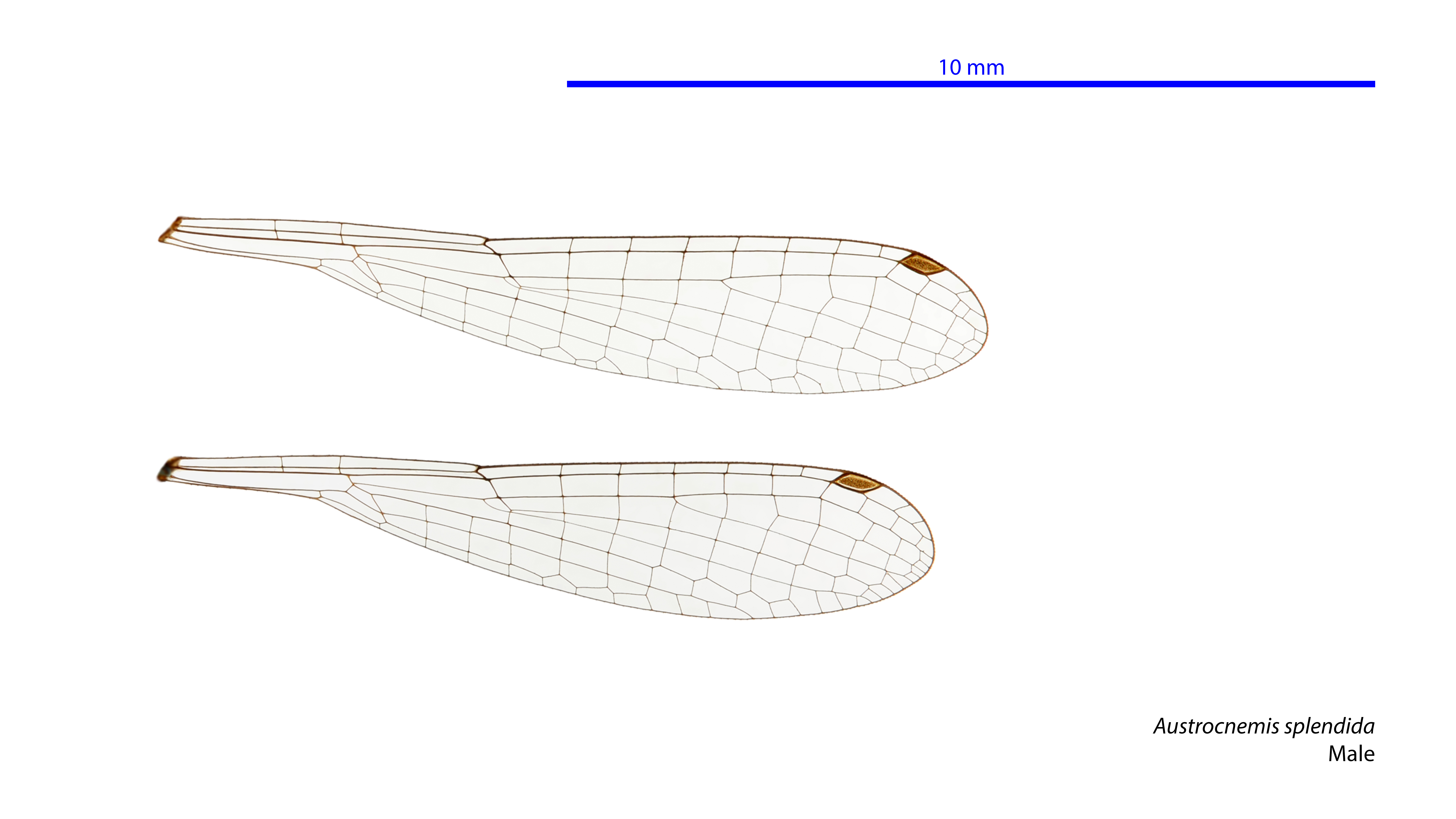
Male wings

== See also ==
- List of Odonata species of Australia
