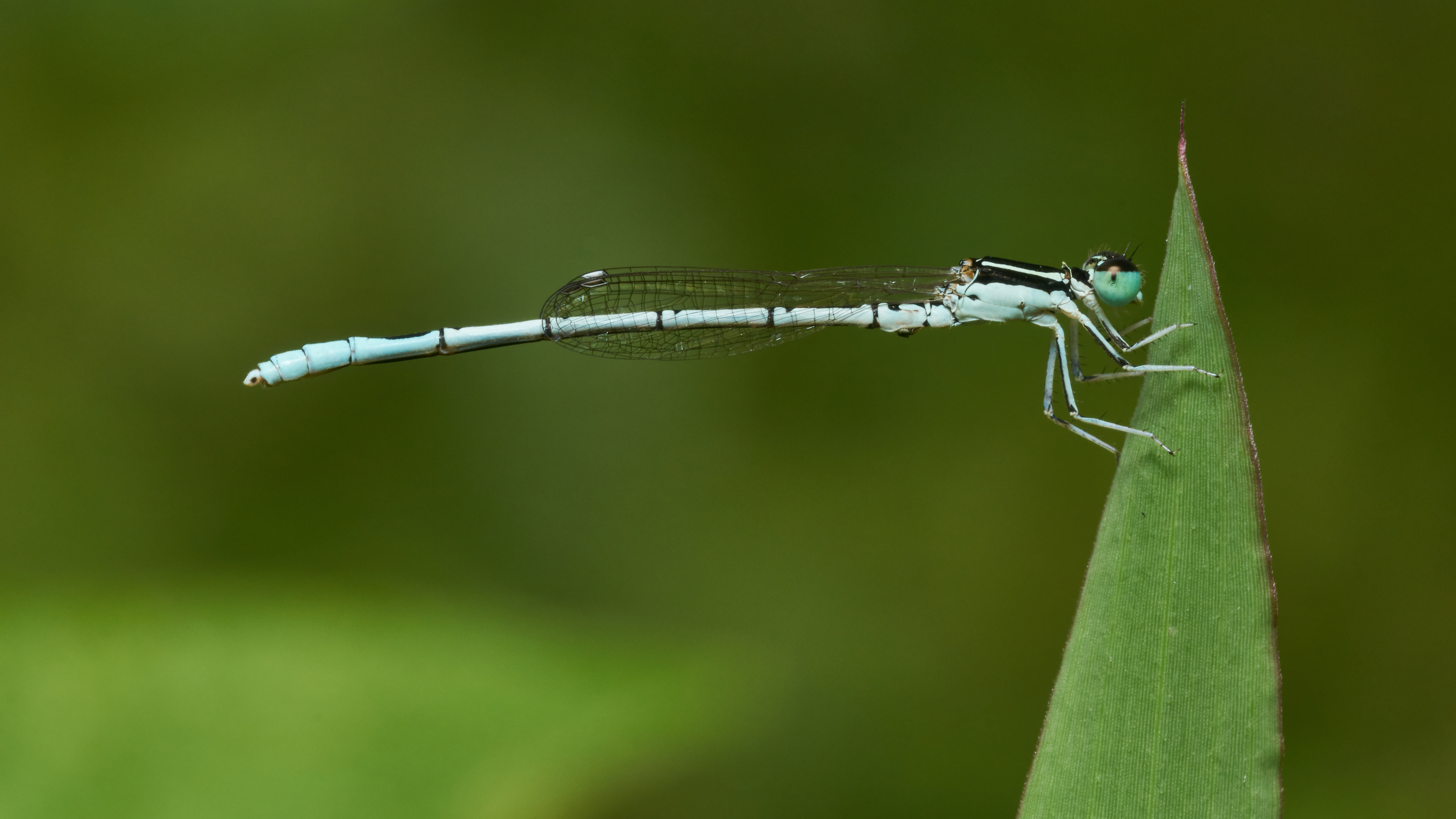
- male
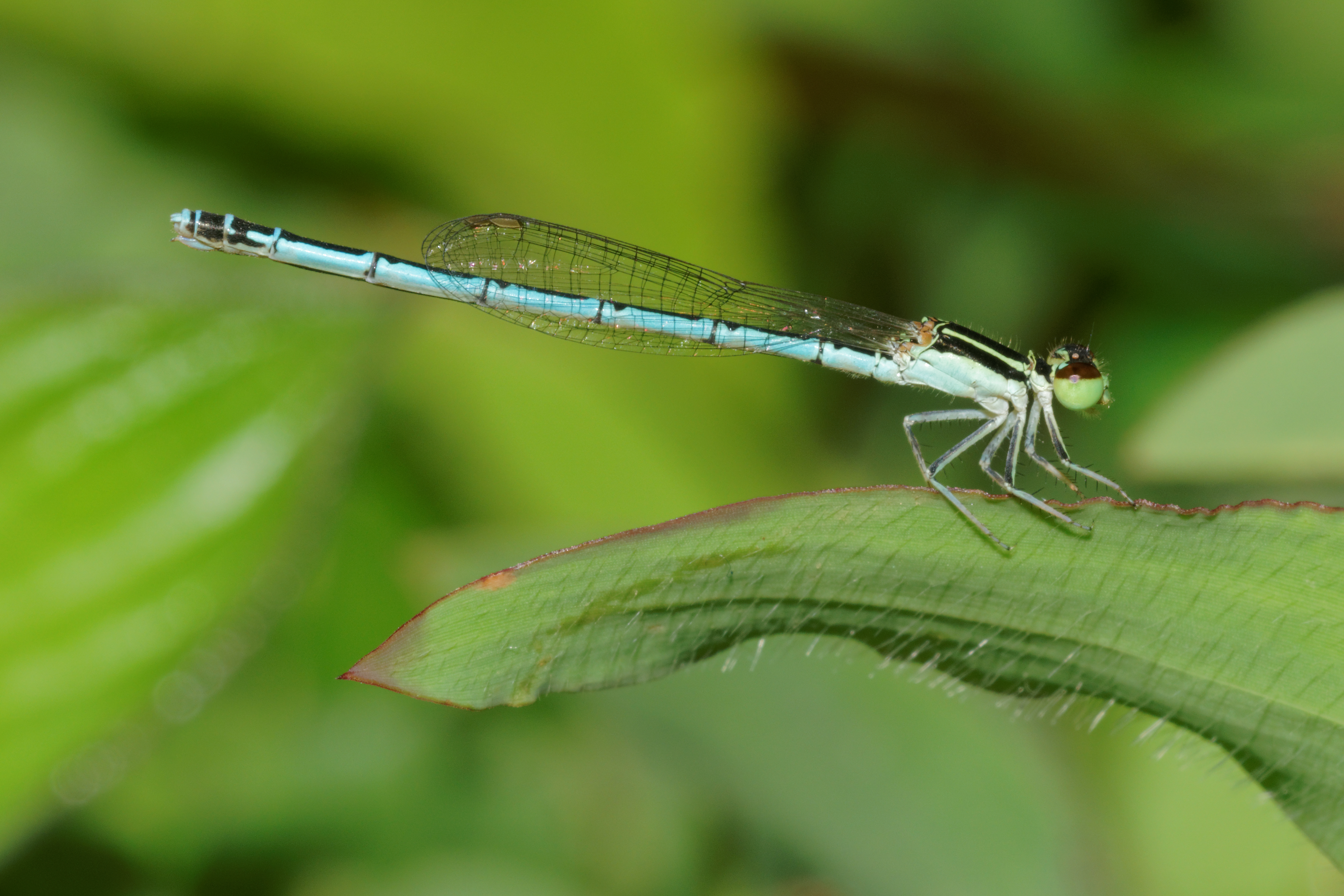
- female

Conservation status
- Least Concern (IUCN 3.1)

Scientific classification
- Kingdom: Animalia
- Phylum: Arthropoda
- Clade: Pancrustacea
- Class: Insecta
- Order: Odonata
- Suborder: Zygoptera
- Family: Coenagrionidae
- Genus: Agriocnemis
- Species: A. pieris

Binomial name
- Agriocnemis pieris Laidlaw, 1919

= Agriocnemis pieris =

Species of damselfly

Agriocnemis pieris, white dartlet, is a species of damselfly in the family Coenagrionidae. It is found in India and is likely to extend into Bangladesh.

== Description and habitat ==
It is a slender, small damselfly but very conspicuous with its bluish white color with dorsal black spots. Its eyes are pale blue with a black cap, thorax is black on dorsum and pale blue on the sides. Its abdomen is pale blue, deepening on the last four segments. They are marked with black on dorsum up to segment 8. Agriocnemis lacteola lacks these dorsal black marks on segments 4 to 10 of the abdomen. Female is similar to the male, but more robust and the blue is more dark. Its abdomen is marked with black up to segment 9. There is a narrow longitudinal lateral stripe of blue on segment 8. The females of this species exhibit sexual mimicry. One group mimics the males' colour (androchromes). Other groups have their own female colouration (gynochromes).

It breeds in marshes and wet grasslands.

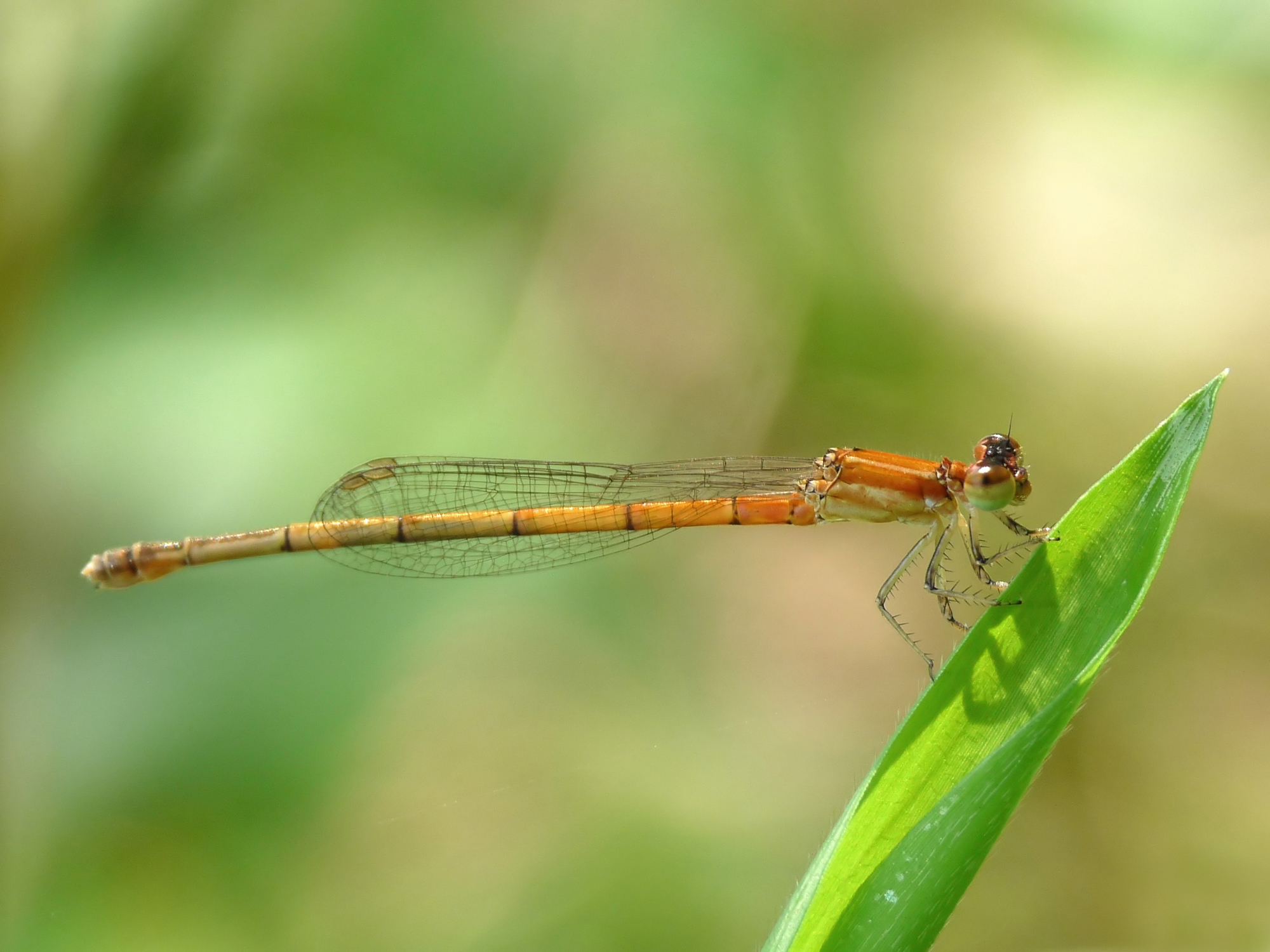
Female (gynochrome)

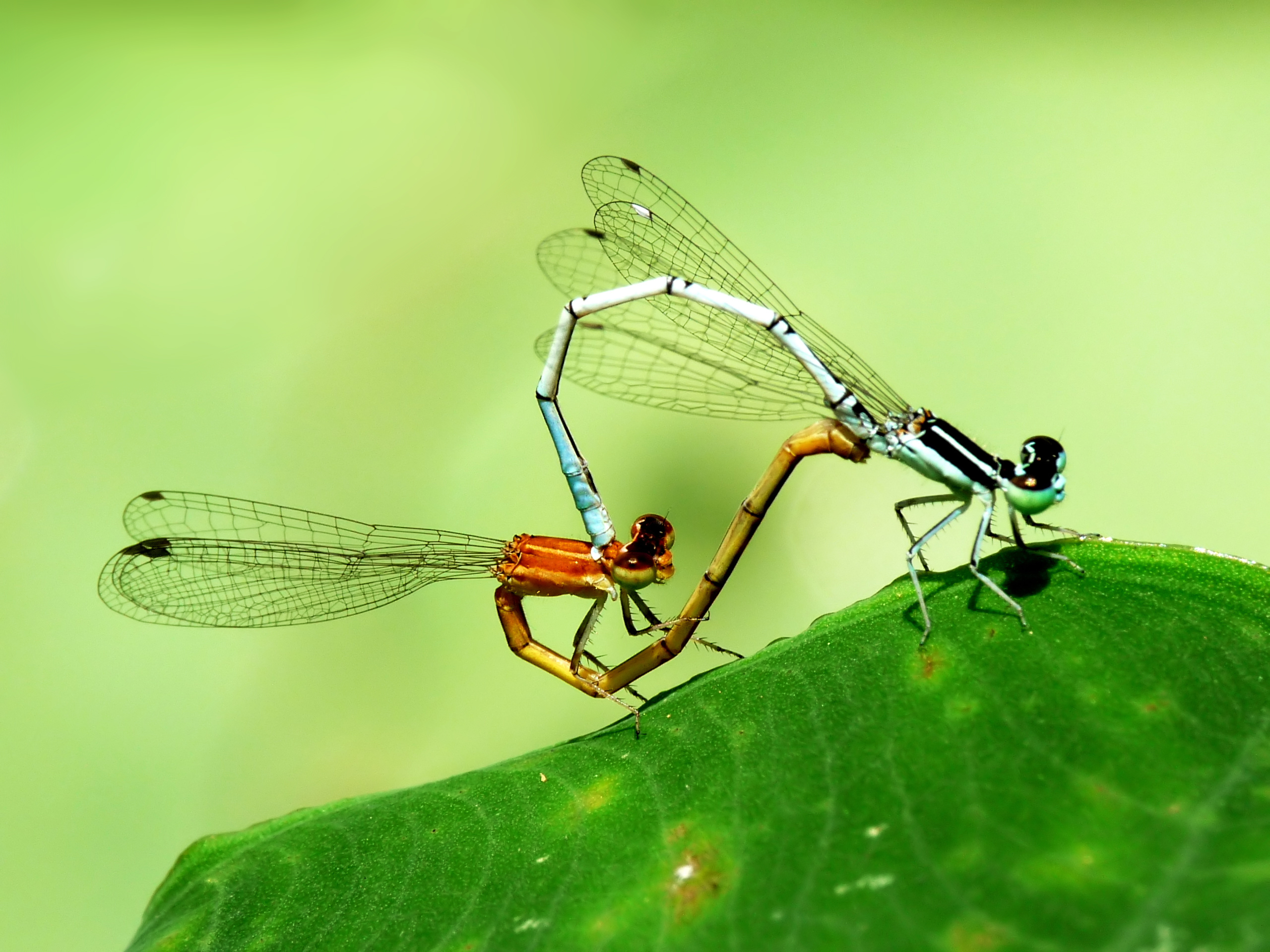
Mating pair (female gynochrome)

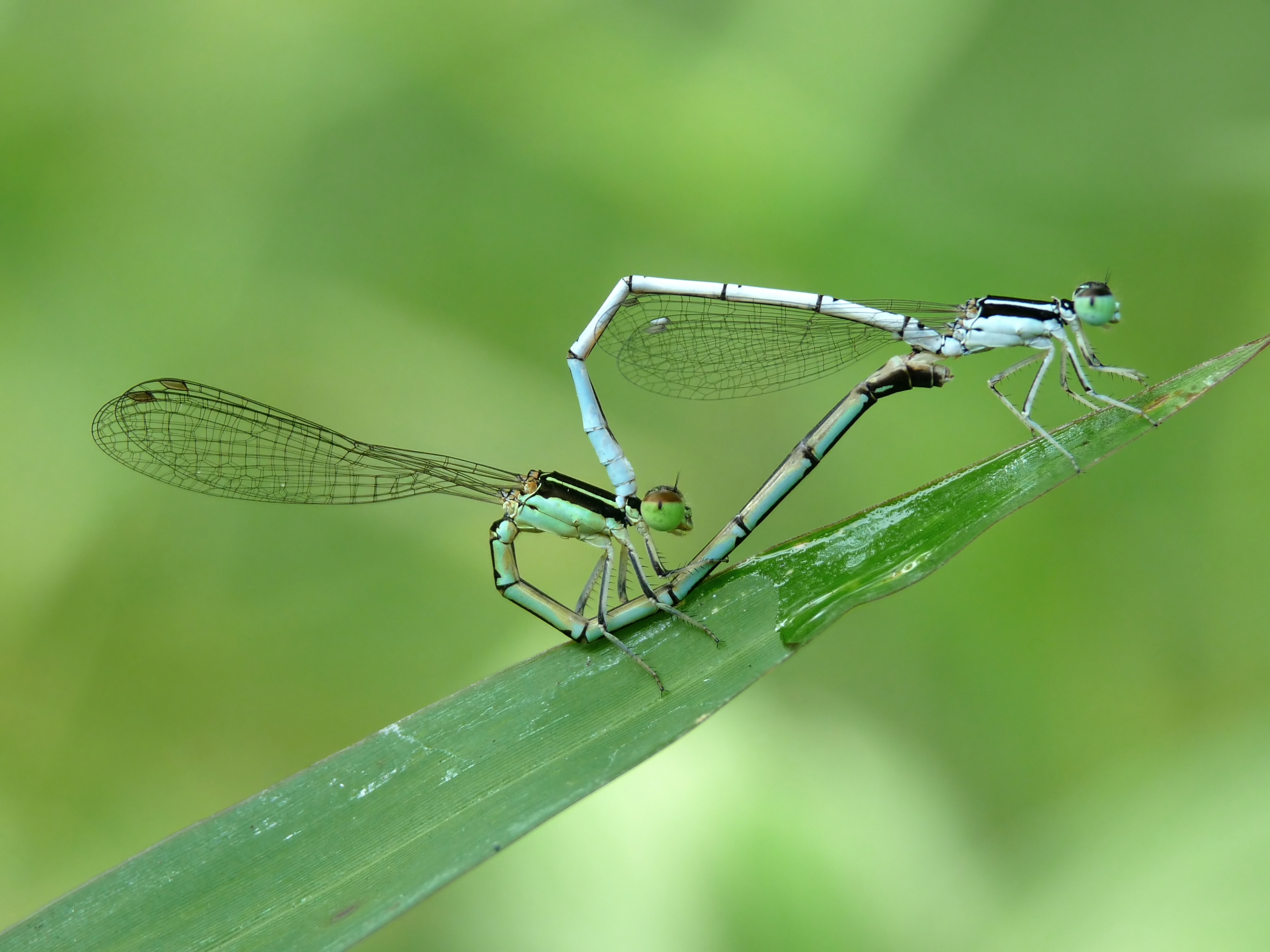
Mating pair (female androchrome)

== See also ==
- List of odonates of India
- List of odonata of Kerala
