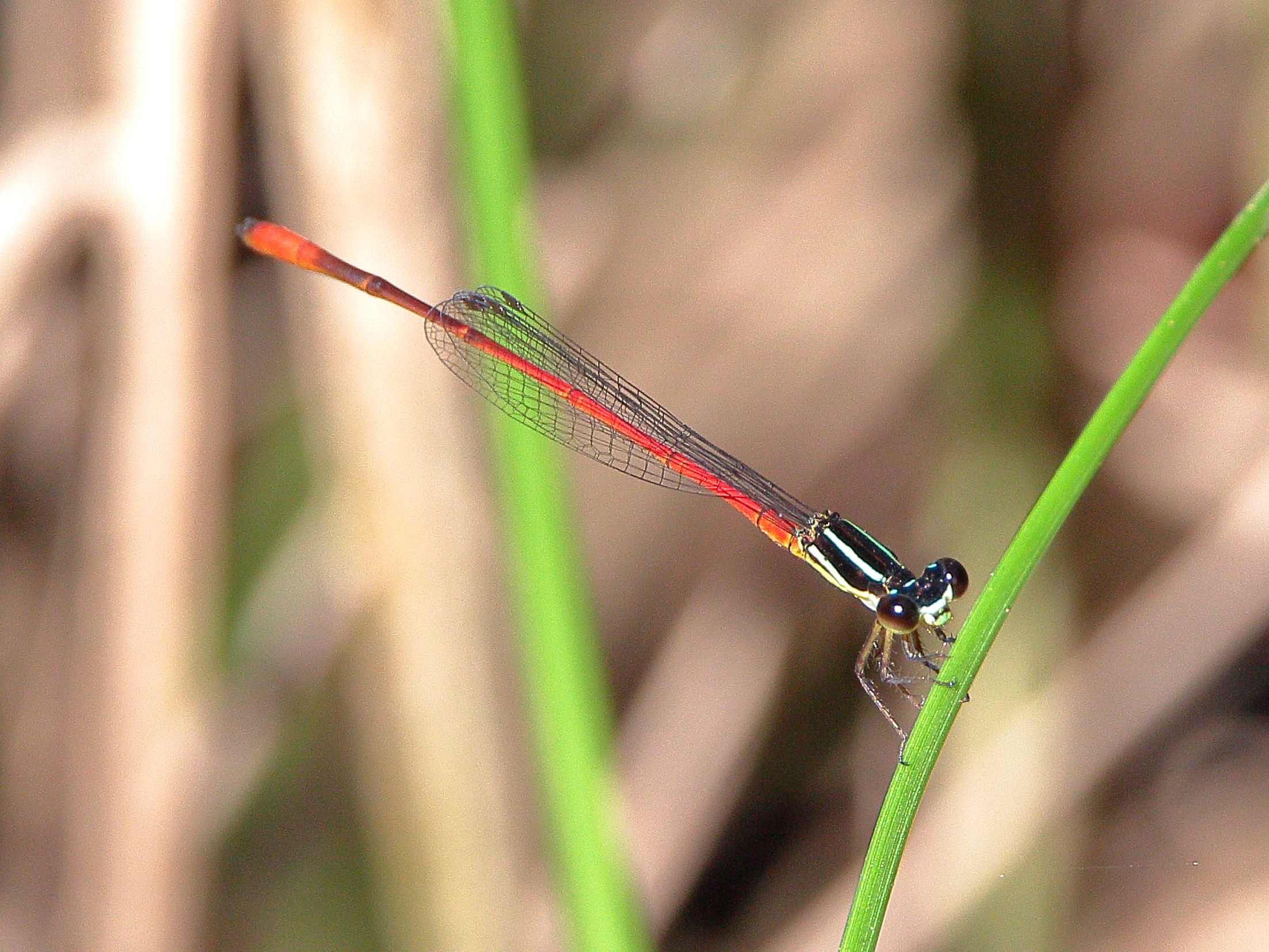
- Argiocnemis rubescens

Scientific classification
- Kingdom: Animalia
- Phylum: Arthropoda
- Clade: Pancrustacea
- Class: Insecta
- Order: Odonata
- Suborder: Zygoptera
- Family: Coenagrionidae
- Genus: Argiocnemis; Selys, 1877

= Argiocnemis =

Genus of damselflies

Argiocnemis is a genus of damselfly in the family Coenagrionidae. Species of Argiocnemis are generally small to medium-sized damselflies, darkly coloured with pale markings. They occur in Africa, Indian Ocean islands, South-east Asia, New Guinea and Australia.

== Species ==
The genus Argiocnemis contains the following species:

- Argiocnemis ensifera Lieftinck, 1932
- Argiocnemis rubescens Selys, 1877 - red-tipped shadefly
- Argiocnemis solitaria (Selys, 1872)

== Etymology ==
The genus name Argiocnemis is derived from -cnemis, from the Greek κνημίς (knēmis, "greave" or "legging"), a suffix commonly used in damselfly names, and a prefix Argio- of uncertain origin, possibly from the Greek ἀργία (argia, "idleness" or "leisure") or formed as an anagram of Agrio-, based on the genus Agrion.
