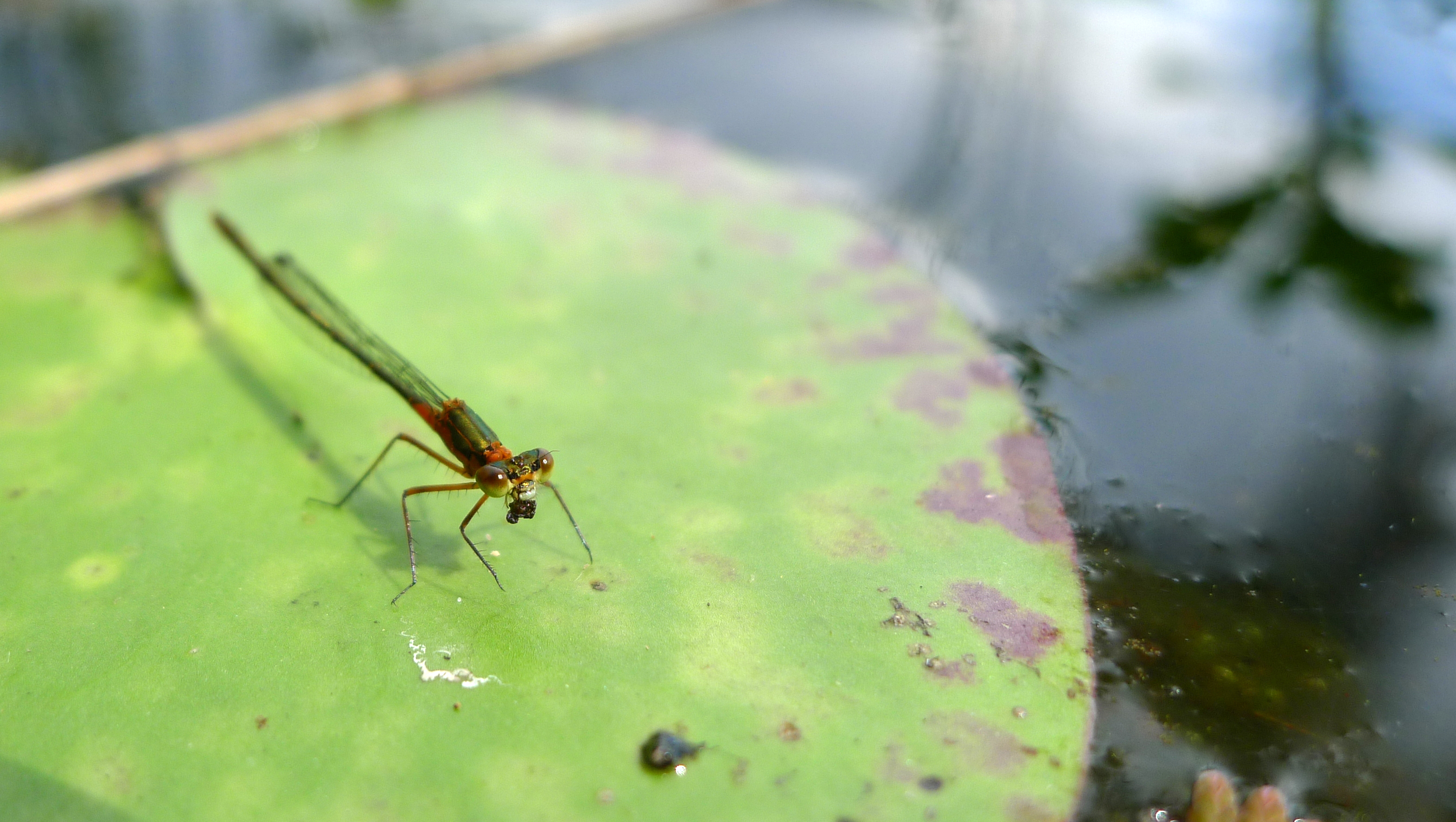
- Austrocnemis splendida

Scientific classification
- Kingdom: Animalia
- Phylum: Arthropoda
- Clade: Pancrustacea
- Class: Insecta
- Order: Odonata
- Suborder: Zygoptera
- Family: Coenagrionidae
- Genus: Austrocnemis; Tillyard, 1913

= Austrocnemis =

Genus of damselflies

Austrocnemis is a genus of damselflies belonging to the family Coenagrionidae. Species of Austrocnemis are tiny, bronze-black damselflies with long legs. They occur in New Guinea and Australia.

== Etymology ==
The genus name Austrocnemis combines the prefix austro- (from Latin auster, meaning “south wind”, hence “southern”) with -cnemis, from the Greek κνημίς (knēmis, “greave” or “legging”). The element -cnemis was first used in Platycnemis, referring to the expanded tibiae in that genus, but has since been used more broadly in the names of damselflies.

In 1913, Robin Tillyard proposed the genus Austrocnemis for the damselfly then known as Agriocnemis splendida. The name refers to a southern representative of that group.

== Species ==
The genus Austrocnemis includes the following species:

- Austrocnemis maccullochi (Tillyard, 1926)
- Austrocnemis obscura Theischinger & Watson, 1991
- Austrocnemis splendida (Martin, 1901)
