= Coenagriocnemis =

Scientific classification
- Kingdom: Animalia
- Phylum: Arthropoda
- Class: Insecta
- Order: Odonata
- Suborder: Zygoptera
- Family: Coenagrionidae
- Genus: Coenagriocnemis; Fraser, 1949

Genus of damselflies

Coenagriocnemis is a genus of damselfly in the family Coenagrionidae. The whole genus is endemic to the Mascarene Islands.

The genus contains the following species:

- Coenagriocnemis insulare (Selys, 1872)
- Coenagriocnemis ramburi Fraser, 1950
- Coenagriocnemis reuniense (Fraser, 1957)
- Coenagriocnemis rufipes (Rambur, 1842)
