= Red tail =

The term red tail may refer to the following animals:

- Red-tailed hawk (Buteo jamaicensis), a North American bird of prey
- Red-tailed boa (Boa constrictor), a Central American snake
- Red-tailed Barbel (Barbus haasi), a European barbel
- Redtail catfish (Phractocephalus hemioliopterus), a South American freshwater fish
- Red-tailed black shark or Red-tailed shark (Epalzeorhynchos bicolor), a common aquarium freshwater fish native to Thailand
- Redtail barb (Enteromius gurneyi), a freshwater fish from South Africa
- Red tailed tinfoil barb (Barbonymus altus), a freshwater fish from Southeast Asia
- Red-tailed black cockatoo (Calyptorhynchus banksii), a cockatoo native to Australia
- Red-tailed tropicbird (Phaëthon rubricauda), a seabird
- Red-tailed sportive lemur (Lepilemur ruficaudatus), a primate native to Madagascar
- Redtail (Ceriagrion aeruginosum) a species of damselfly found in south-eastern Australia

The term may also refer to:

- Redtailing, following a fellow snowboarder too closely.
- Redtail, a CRM designed exclusively for financial professionals
- Redtail Nature Awareness, a nature based camp in Pictou County, Nova Scotia, Canada
- A member of the Tuskegee Airmen (the popular name for the 332d Fighter Group), a unit of African American fighter pilots during World War II
  - Red Tails, a 2012 movie
  - Red Tail Project
- Redtail, a cat from Erin Hunter's Warriors series
- Redtail Telematics Corporation, a manufacturer and distributor of GPS tracking equipment.
- A nickname for Northwest Airlines
