= Ceriagrion kordofanicum =

Conservation status
- Least Concern (IUCN 3.1)

Scientific classification
- Kingdom: Animalia
- Phylum: Arthropoda
- Class: Insecta
- Order: Odonata
- Suborder: Zygoptera
- Family: Coenagrionidae
- Genus: Ceriagrion
- Species: C. kordofanicum

Binomial name
- Ceriagrion kordofanicum Ris, 1924

Species of damselfly

Ceriagrion kordofanicum is a species of damselfly in the family Coenagrionidae. It is found in Kenya, Malawi, Mozambique, Sudan, Tanzania, Uganda, Zambia, and possibly Burundi. Its natural habitats are rivers, intermittent rivers, shrub-dominated wetlands, swamps, freshwater lakes, intermittent freshwater lakes, freshwater marshes, and intermittent freshwater marshes. It is threatened by habitat loss.
