= Ceriagrion bakeri =

Conservation status
- Least Concern (IUCN 3.1)

Scientific classification
- Kingdom: Animalia
- Phylum: Arthropoda
- Class: Insecta
- Order: Odonata
- Suborder: Zygoptera
- Family: Coenagrionidae
- Genus: Ceriagrion
- Species: C. bakeri

Binomial name
- Ceriagrion bakeri Fraser, 1941

Species of damselfly

Ceriagrion bakeri is a species of damselfly in the family Coenagrionidae. It is found in Angola, the Democratic Republic of the Congo, Ivory Coast, Ghana, Guinea, Liberia, Nigeria, Senegal, Sierra Leone, Togo, Uganda, Zambia, and possibly Kenya. Its natural habitats are dry savanna, moist savanna, subtropical or tropical dry shrubland, subtropical or tropical moist shrubland, and inland karsts.
