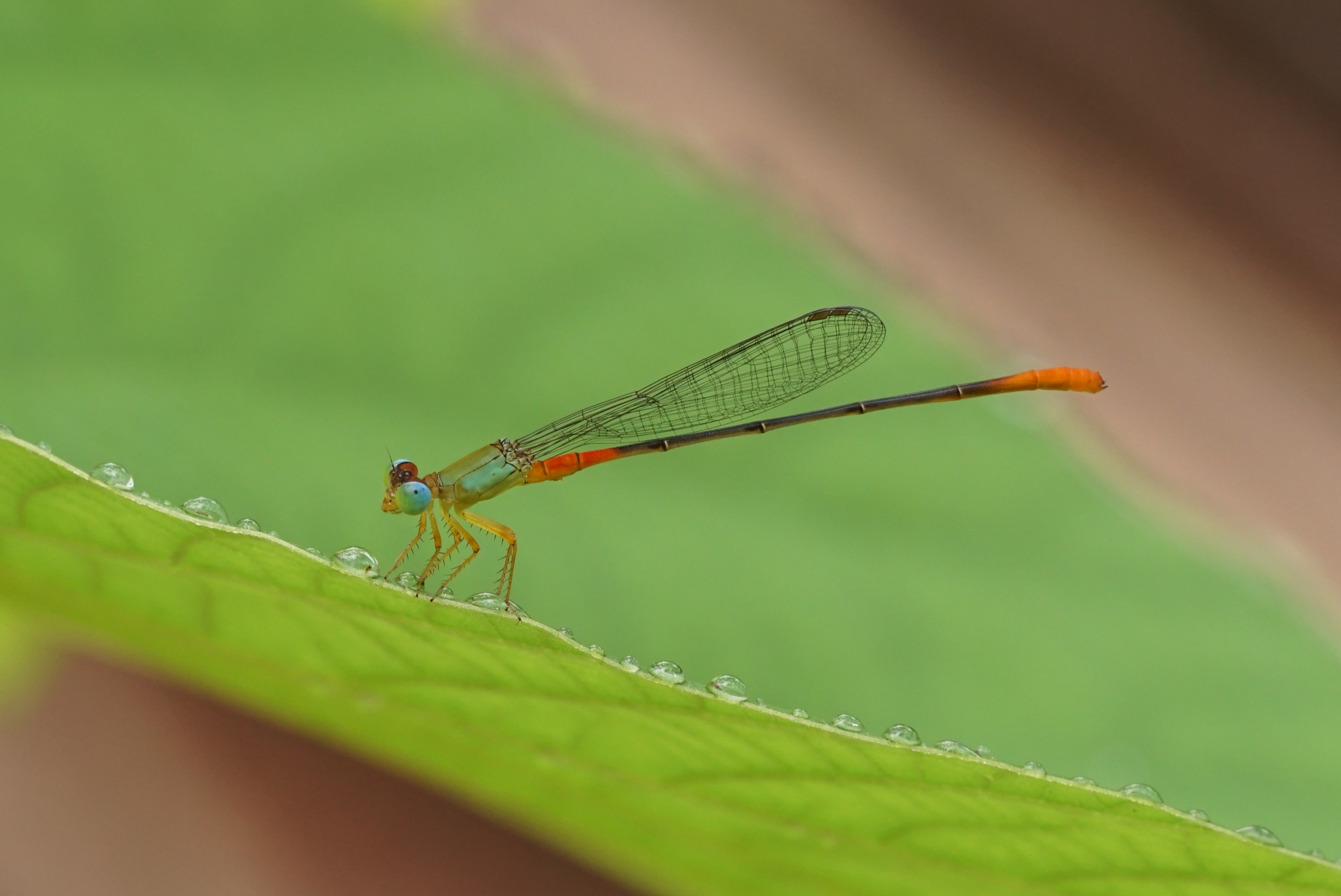
- Male
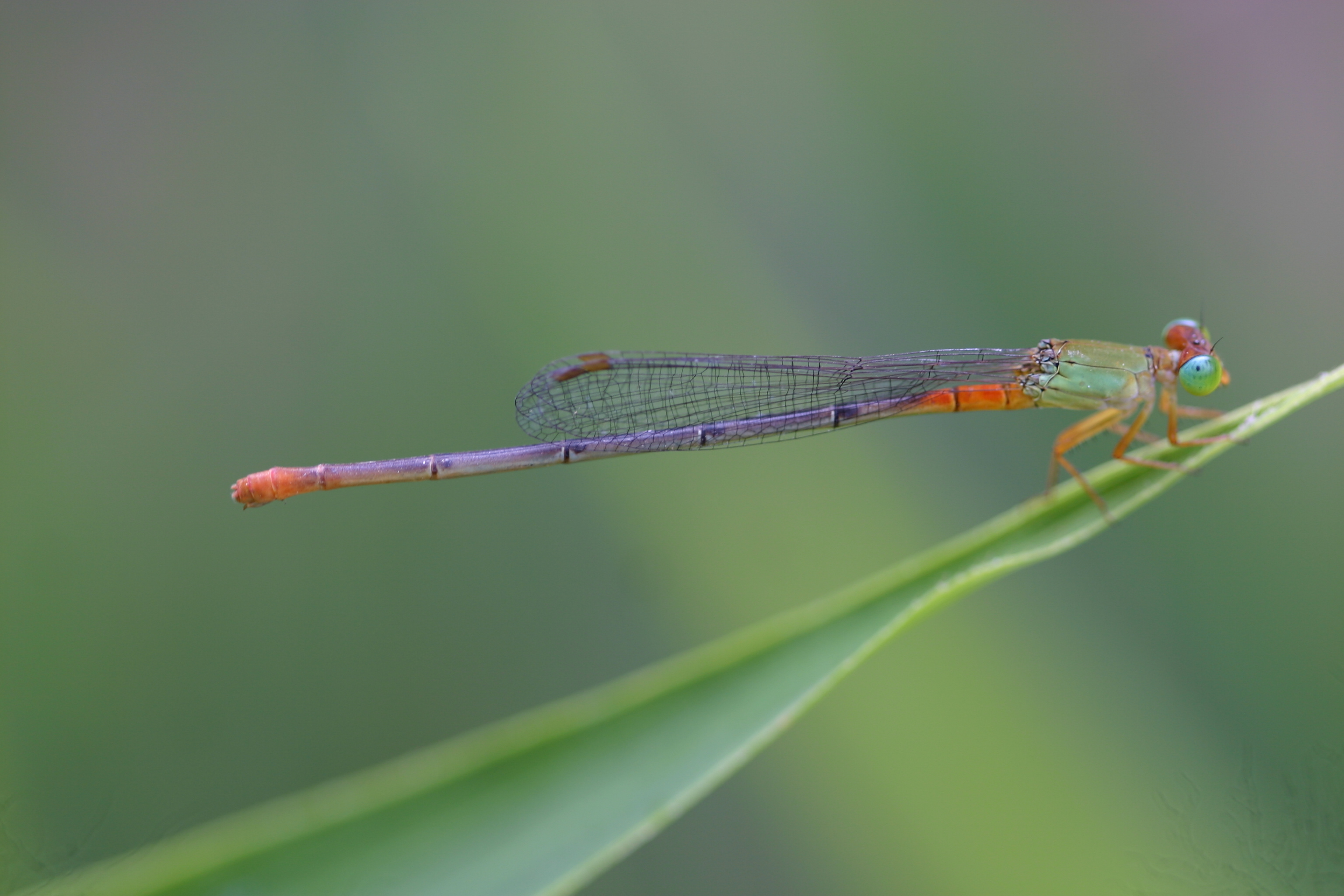
- Female

Conservation status
- Least Concern (IUCN 3.1)

Scientific classification
- Kingdom: Animalia
- Phylum: Arthropoda
- Clade: Pancrustacea
- Class: Insecta
- Order: Odonata
- Suborder: Zygoptera
- Family: Coenagrionidae
- Genus: Ceriagrion
- Species: C. cerinorubellum

Binomial name
- Ceriagrion cerinorubellum (Brauer, 1865)

= Ceriagrion cerinorubellum =

Species of damselfly

Ceriagrion cerinorubellum, commonly known as the orange-tailed marsh dart or bi-coloured damsel, is a medium-sized damselfly in the family Coenagrionidae. It is a very common species of damselflies in Asia.

== Distribution ==
This species can be found in Bangladesh, China, Indonesia, India, Sri Lanka, Myanmar, Malaysia, Philippines, Peninsular Malaysia, Singapore, Thailand, Vietnam.

== Description and habitat ==
It is a medium-sized damselfly with greenish eyes, bluish above. Its thorax is yellowish green. Segments 1,2 and basal half of three and apical half of 7 to 10 are in brick red color. Other segments are black on dorsal half and pale blue on the ventral half. Female is similar to the male; but more robust and with dull colors.

It breeds in weeded ponds, marshes and other stillwater forms.

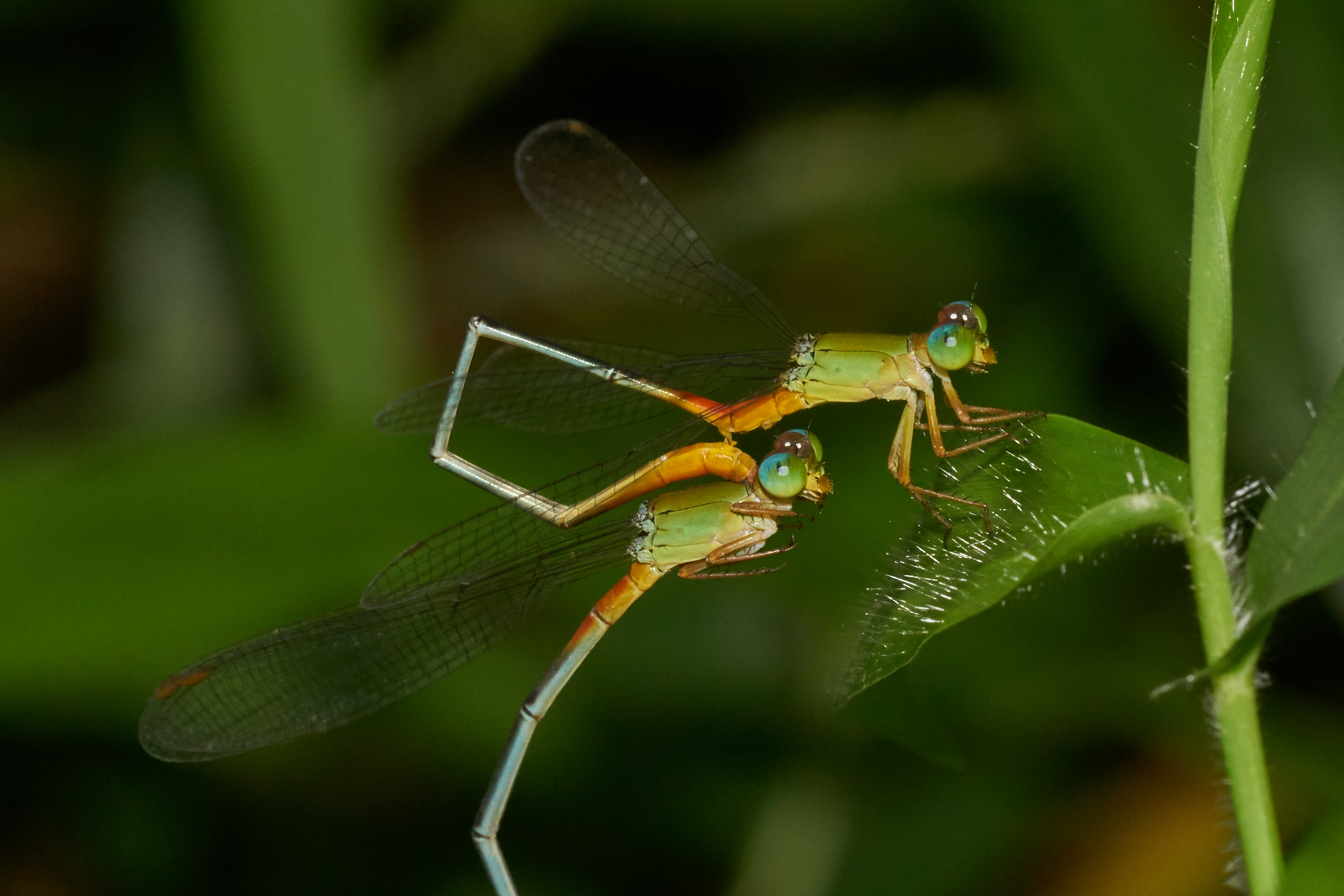
sperm translocation

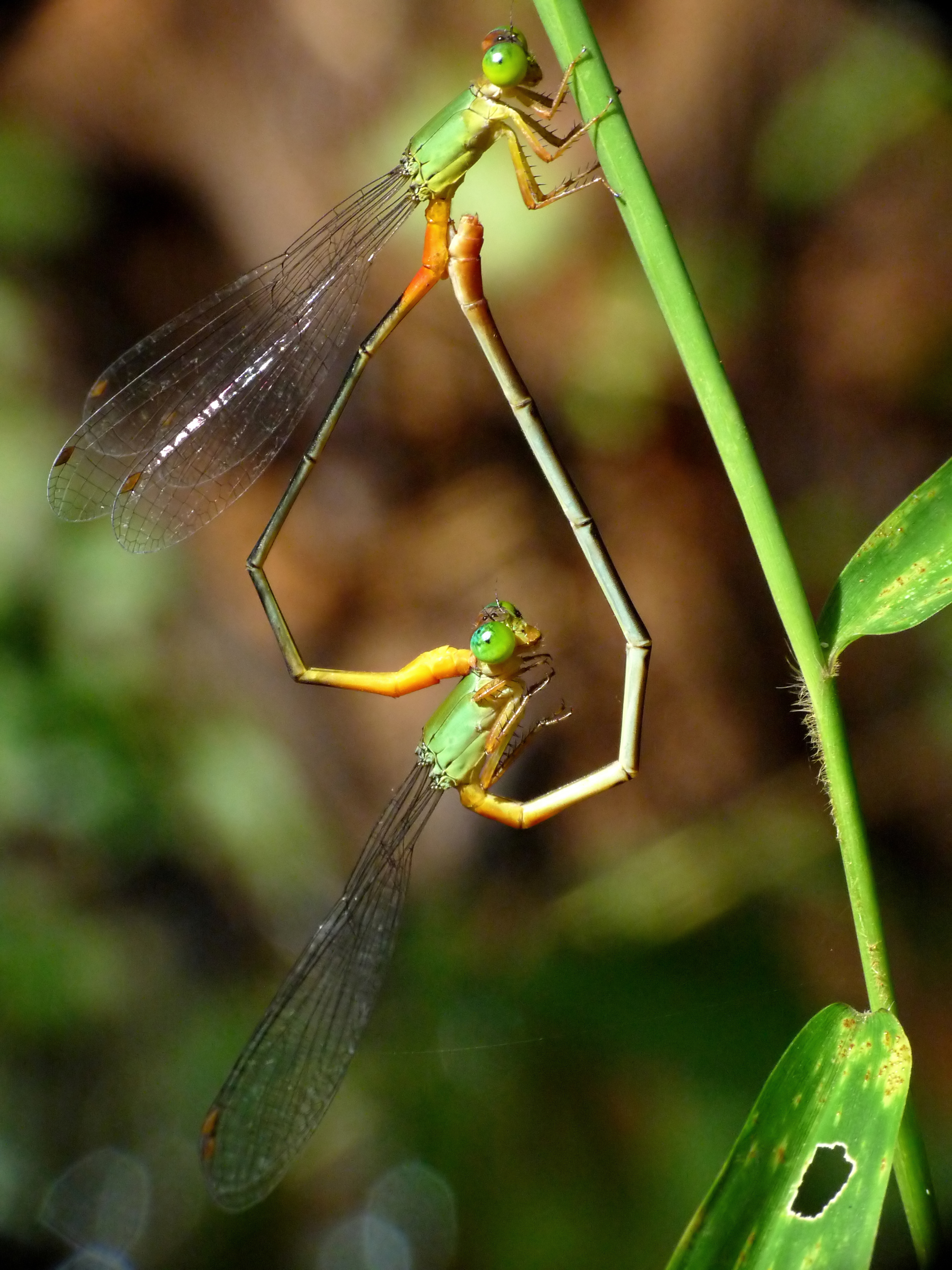
mating

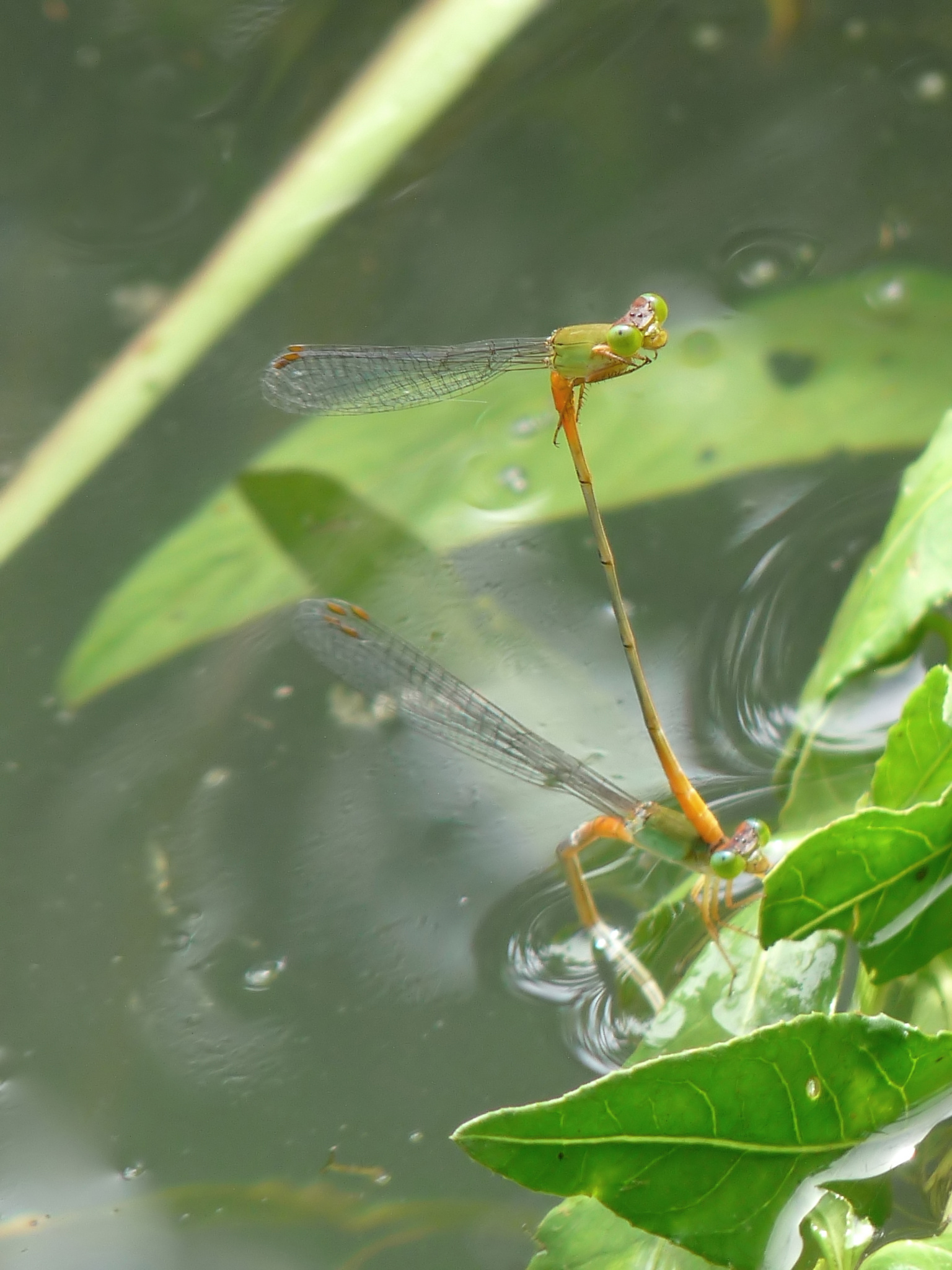
ovipositing

== See also ==
- List of odonata species of India
- List of odonata of Kerala
