= Ceriagrion suave =

Conservation status
- Least Concern (IUCN 3.1)

Scientific classification
- Kingdom: Animalia
- Phylum: Arthropoda
- Class: Insecta
- Order: Odonata
- Suborder: Zygoptera
- Family: Coenagrionidae
- Genus: Ceriagrion
- Species: C. suave

Binomial name
- Ceriagrion suave Ris, 1921

Species of damselfly

Ceriagrion suave is a species of damselfly in the family Coenagrionidae. It is found in Angola, Botswana, Burkina Faso, Ivory Coast, Ethiopia, Gambia, Ghana, Guinea, Kenya, Liberia, Malawi, Mozambique, Namibia, Nigeria, Senegal, Sierra Leone, Somalia, South Africa, Tanzania, Togo, Uganda, Zambia, Zimbabwe, and possibly Burundi.

== Habitat ==
Its natural habitats are pools and streams in subtropical or tropical dry savanna, moist savanna, dry shrubland and moist shrubland.
