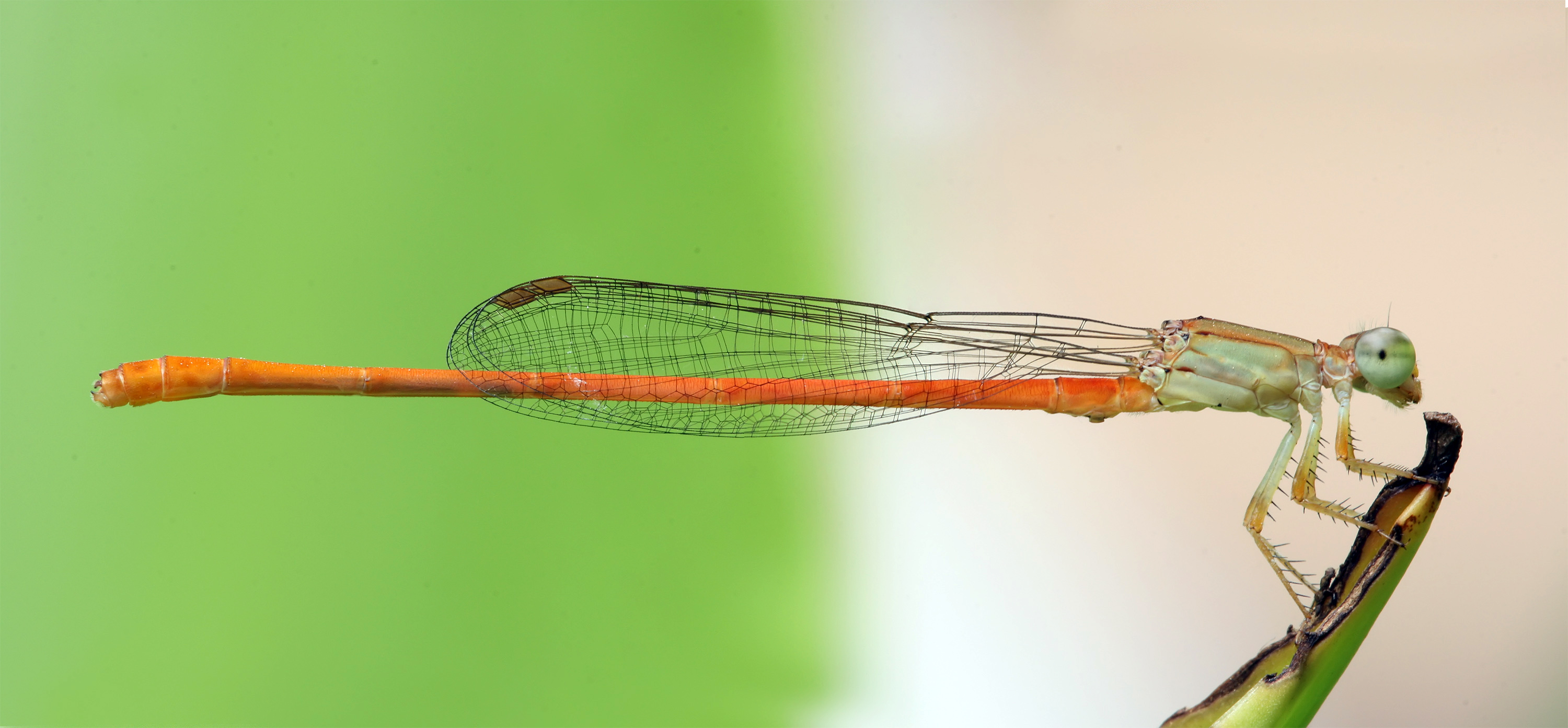
- Male Ceriagrion glabrum
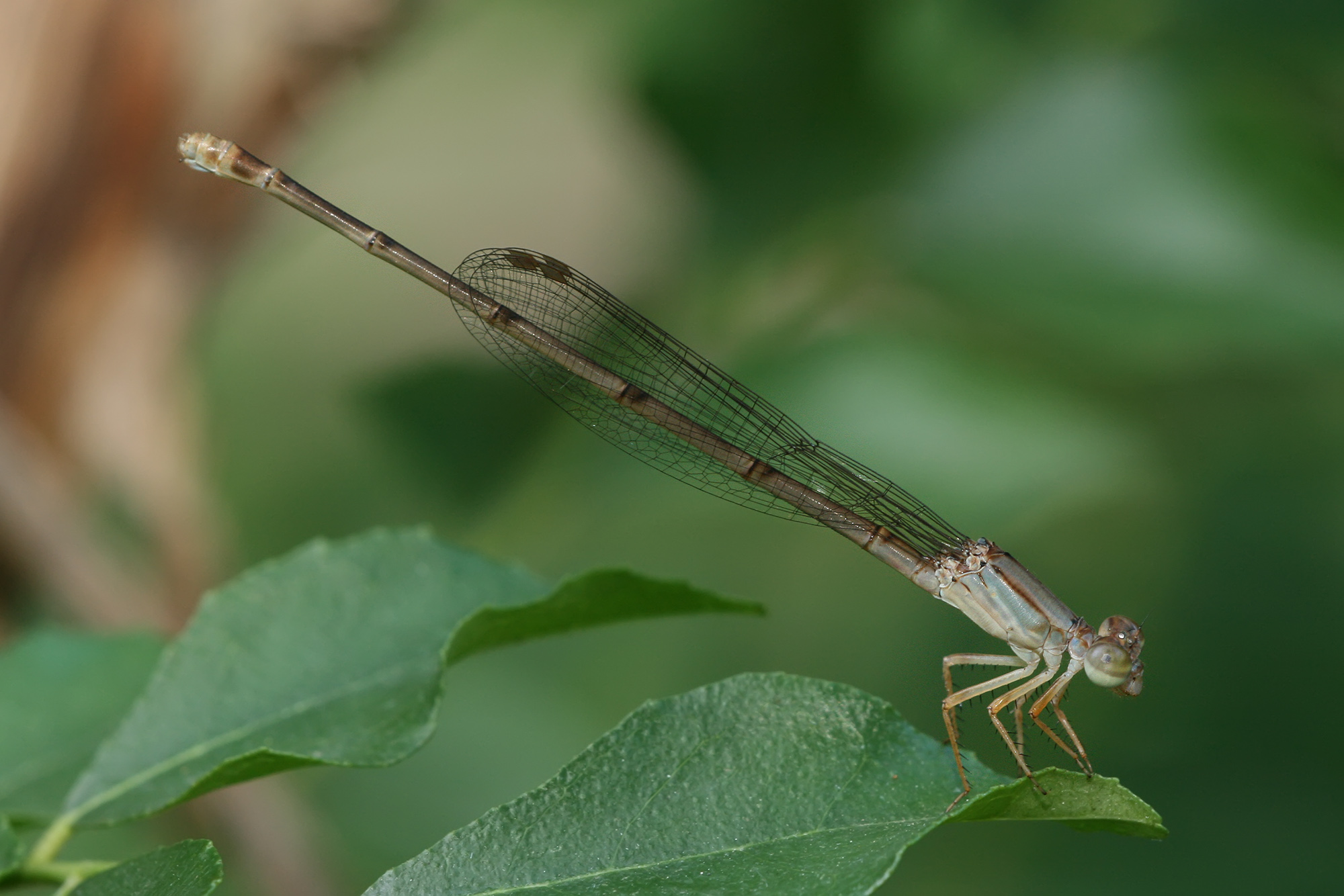
- Female Ceriagrion glabrum

Scientific classification
- Kingdom: Animalia
- Phylum: Arthropoda
- Clade: Pancrustacea
- Class: Insecta
- Order: Odonata
- Suborder: Zygoptera
- Family: Coenagrionidae
- Genus: Ceriagrion; Selys, 1876

= Ceriagrion =

Genus of damselflies

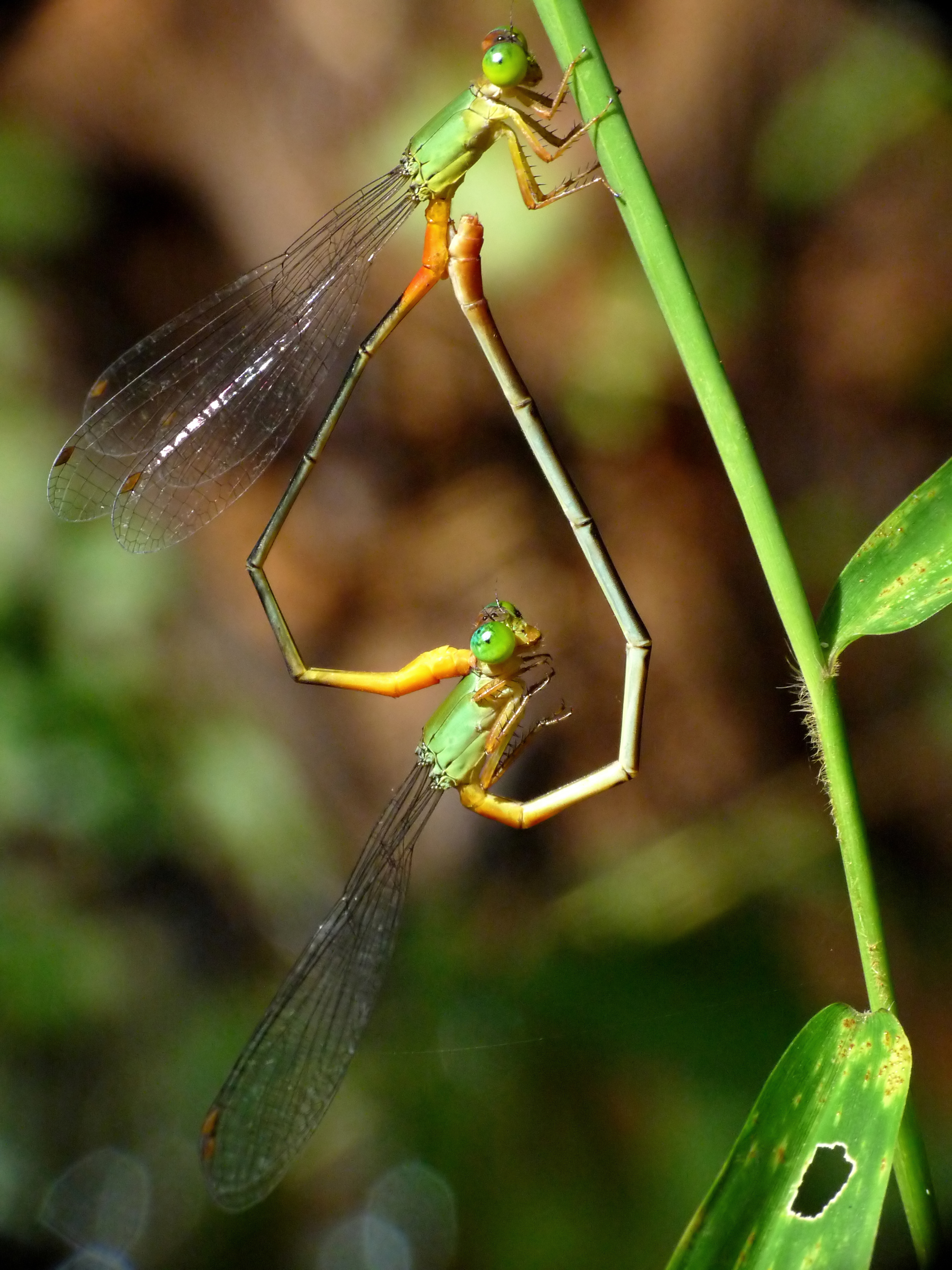
Ceriagrion cerinorubellum mating

Ceriagrion is a genus of damselfly in the family Coenagrionidae. Species of Ceriagrion are small to medium size, generally brightly coloured damselflies. They are found across the Old World, Africa, Asia and Australia.

== Species ==
The genus Ceriagrion includes the following species:

- Ceriagrion aeruginosum (Brauer, 1869) – Redtail
- Ceriagrion annulatum Fraser, 1955
- Ceriagrion annulosum Lieftinck, 1934
- Ceriagrion auranticum Fraser, 1922
- Ceriagrion auritum Fraser, 1951
- Ceriagrion azureum (Selys, 1891)
- Ceriagrion bakeri Fraser, 1941
- Ceriagrion batjanum Asahina, 1967
- Ceriagrion bellona Laidlaw, 1915
- Ceriagrion calamineum Lieftinck, 1951
- Ceriagrion cerinorubellum (Brauer, 1865)
- Ceriagrion chaoi Schmidt, 1964
- Ceriagrion citrinum Campion, 1914
- Ceriagrion coeruleum Laidlaw, 1919
- Ceriagrion corallinum Campion, 1914
- Ceriagrion coromandelianum (Fabricius, 1798)
- Ceriagrion fallax Ris, 1914
- Ceriagrion georgifreyi Schmidt, 1953 – Turkish Red Damsel
- Ceriagrion glabrum (Burmeister, 1839) – Common Orange, Common Pond-damsel, Common Citril
- Ceriagrion hamoni Fraser, 1955
- Ceriagrion hoogerwerfi Lieftinck, 1940
- Ceriagrion ignitum Campion, 1914
- Ceriagrion inaequale Lieftinck, 1932
- Ceriagrion indochinense Asahina, 1967
- Ceriagrion katamborae Pinhey, 1961
- Ceriagrion kordofanicum Ris, 1924
- Ceriagrion lieftincki Asahina, 1967
- Ceriagrion madagazureum Fraser, 1949
- Ceriagrion malaisei Schmidt, 1964
- Ceriagrion melanurum Selys, 1876
- Ceriagrion moorei Longfield, 1952
- Ceriagrion mourae Pinhey, 1969
- Ceriagrion nigroflavum Fraser, 1933
- Ceriagrion nigrolineatum Schmidt, 1951
- Ceriagrion nipponicum Asahina, 1967
- Ceriagrion oblongulum Schmidt, 1951
- Ceriagrion olivaceum Laidlaw, 1914
- Ceriagrion pallidum Fraser, 1933
- Ceriagrion praetermissum Lieftinck, 1929
- Ceriagrion rubellocerinum Fraser, 1947
- Ceriagrion rubiae Laidlaw, 1916
- Ceriagrion sakejii Pinhey, 1963
- Ceriagrion sinense Asahina, 1967
- Ceriagrion suave Ris, 1921 – Suave Citril
- Ceriagrion tenellum (de Villers, 1789) – Small Red Damselfly
- Ceriagrion tricrenaticeps Legrand, 1984
- Ceriagrion varians (Martin, 1908)
- Ceriagrion whellani Longfield, 1952

== Etymology ==
The genus name Ceriagrion is derived from the Latin cerinus ("wax-coloured"), combined with Agrion, a genus name derived from the Greek ἄγριος (agrios, "wild"). Agrion was the name given in 1775 by Johan Christian Fabricius for all damselflies.
