= Ceriagrion mourae =

Conservation status
- Least Concern (IUCN 3.1)

Scientific classification
- Kingdom: Animalia
- Phylum: Arthropoda
- Class: Insecta
- Order: Odonata
- Suborder: Zygoptera
- Family: Coenagrionidae
- Genus: Ceriagrion
- Species: C. mourae

Binomial name
- Ceriagrion mourae Pinhey, 1969

Species of damselfly

Ceriagrion mourae is a species of damselfly in the family Coenagrionidae endemic to eastern Sub-Saharan Africa, most commonly in Mozambique and Tanzania. Being a relatively uncommon sub-species of dragonflies, it is largely unknown to anyone beyond animal conservatives and researchers. Its natural habitats are subtropical or tropical moist lowland forests and freshwater marshes.
