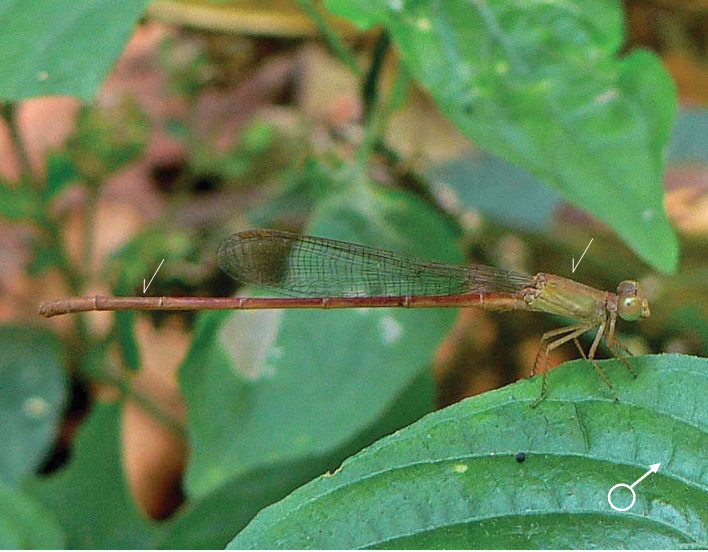
- male
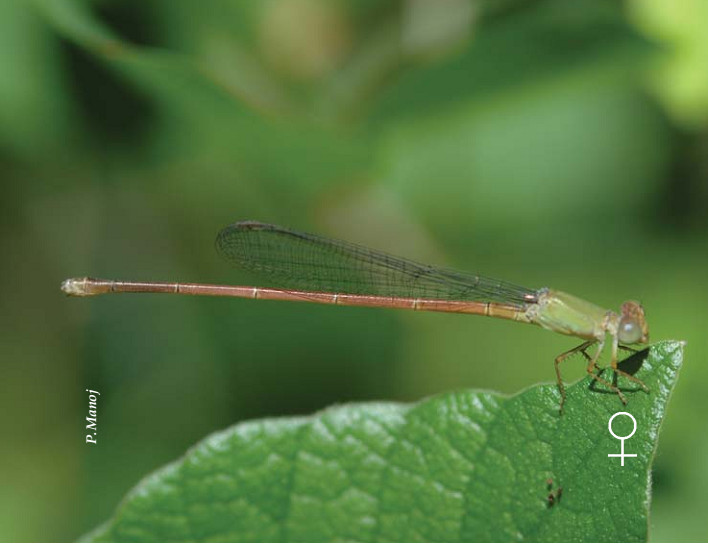
- female

Conservation status
- Least Concern (IUCN 3.1)

Scientific classification
- Kingdom: Animalia
- Phylum: Arthropoda
- Class: Insecta
- Order: Odonata
- Suborder: Zygoptera
- Family: Coenagrionidae
- Genus: Ceriagrion
- Species: C. olivaceum

Binomial name
- Ceriagrion olivaceum Laidlaw, 1914

Synonyms
- Ceriagrion aurantiacum Fraser, 1924

= Ceriagrion olivaceum =

Species of damselfly

Ceriagrion olivaceum is a species of damselfly in the family Coenagrionidae. it is commonly known as rusty marsh dart. This species can be found in south and southeast Asia.

== Subspecies ==
- Ceriagrion olivaceum olivaceum Laidlaw, 1914
- Ceriagrion olivaceum aurantiacum Fraser, 1924

Fraser described C. aurantiacum from southern India but later concluded that it was a subspecies or race of C. olivaceum. Asahina in his revision of Asian Ceriagrion compared both the specimens and decided to retain the race, stating the subapical tooth of superior caudal appendages differently shaped. C. o. olivaceum is widespread in India and Southeast Asia. C. o. aurantiacum is only known from southwest India.

== Description and habitat ==
It is a medium-sized damselfly with olivaceous brown capped greenish eyes. Its thorax is olive green, paler on the sides. Its abdomen is throughout olivaceous brown on dorsal half and paler on the ventral half. Its superior anal appendages are brown and triangular when seen from the dorsum. The apex broadly rounded. The inferiors are sloping strongly up to meet the superiors, broad at base and tapering to a point. Female is similar to the male.

It breeds in slow running marshy streams, ponds, and swamps.

== See also ==
- List of odonates of India
- List of odonates of Sri Lanka
- List of odonata of Kerala
