= Ceriagrion annulatum =

Conservation status
- Least Concern (IUCN 3.1)

Scientific classification
- Kingdom: Animalia
- Phylum: Arthropoda
- Class: Insecta
- Order: Odonata
- Suborder: Zygoptera
- Family: Coenagrionidae
- Genus: Ceriagrion
- Species: C. annulatum

Binomial name
- Ceriagrion annulatum Fraser, 1955

Synonyms
- Argiocnemis umbargae Pinhey, 1970

Species of damselfly

Ceriagrion annulatum is a species of damselfly in the family Coenagrionidae. It is found in Cameroon, the Republic of the Congo, the Democratic Republic of the Congo, and possibly Zambia. Its natural habitats are subtropical or tropical moist lowland forests and swamps.
