= Ceriagrion corallinum =

Conservation status
- Least Concern (IUCN 3.1)

Scientific classification
- Kingdom: Animalia
- Phylum: Arthropoda
- Class: Insecta
- Order: Odonata
- Suborder: Zygoptera
- Family: Coenagrionidae
- Genus: Ceriagrion
- Species: C. corallinum

Binomial name
- Ceriagrion corallinum Campion, 1914

Species of damselfly

Ceriagrion corallinum is a species of damselfly in the family Coenagrionidae. It is found in Angola, Botswana, Cameroon, the Democratic Republic of the Congo, Ivory Coast, Ghana, Liberia, Namibia, Nigeria, Sierra Leone, Sudan, Uganda, Zambia, and possibly Malawi.

Its natural habitats are subtropical or tropical moist lowland forests, swamps, freshwater lakes, intermittent freshwater lakes, freshwater marshes, and intermittent freshwater marshes.
