= Ceriagrion whellani =

Conservation status
- Least Concern (IUCN 3.1)

Scientific classification
- Kingdom: Animalia
- Phylum: Arthropoda
- Class: Insecta
- Order: Odonata
- Suborder: Zygoptera
- Family: Coenagrionidae
- Genus: Ceriagrion
- Species: C. whellani

Binomial name
- Ceriagrion whellani Longfield, 1952

Species of damselfly

Ceriagrion whellani is a species of damselfly in the family Coenagrionidae. It is found in Botswana, Central African Republic, the Republic of the Congo, Ivory Coast, Equatorial Guinea, Gabon, Ghana, Guinea, Kenya, Liberia, Sierra Leone, Tanzania, Uganda, Zambia, Zimbabwe, possibly Burundi, and possibly Malawi. Its natural habitats are subtropical or tropical moist lowland forests, moist savanna, subtropical or tropical moist shrubland, shrub-dominated wetlands, swamps, freshwater marshes, and intermittent freshwater marshes.
