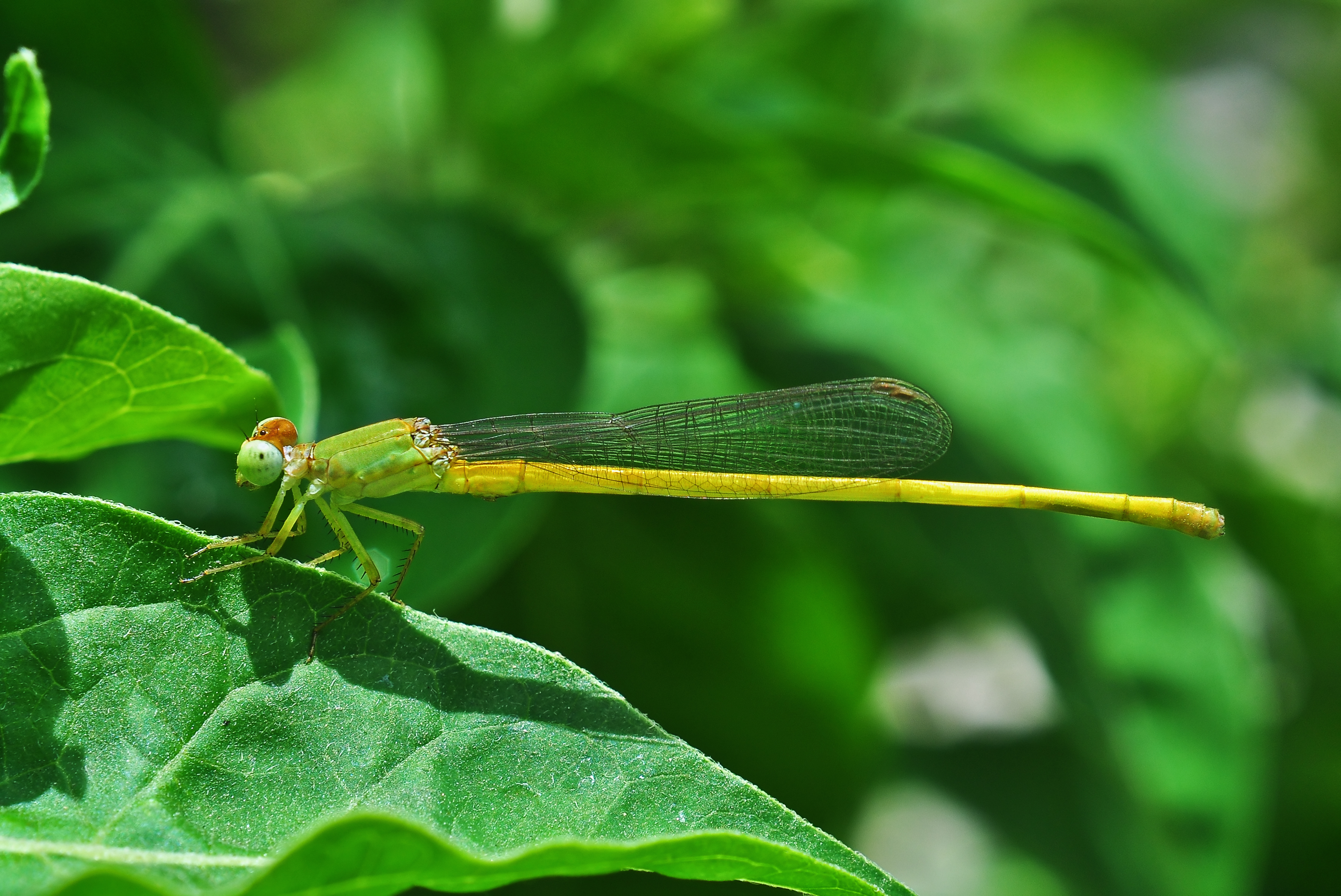
- male
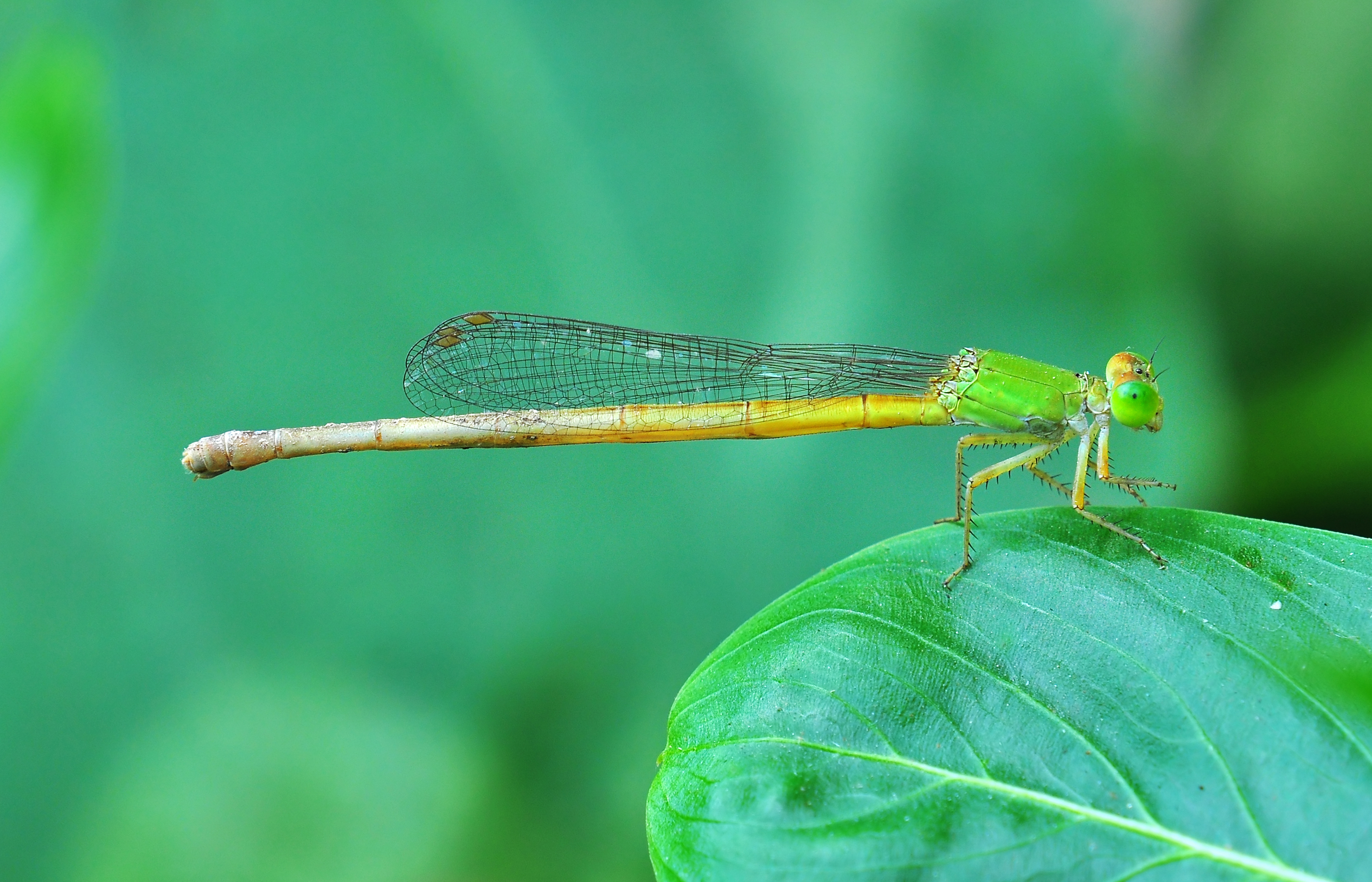
- female

Conservation status
- Least Concern (IUCN 3.1)

Scientific classification
- Kingdom: Animalia
- Phylum: Arthropoda
- Class: Insecta
- Order: Odonata
- Suborder: Zygoptera
- Family: Coenagrionidae
- Genus: Ceriagrion
- Species: C. coromandelianum

Binomial name
- Ceriagrion coromandelianum (Fabricius, 1798)

= Ceriagrion coromandelianum =

Species of damselfly

Ceriagrion coromandelianum is a species of damselfly in the family Coenagrionidae. it is commonly known as coromandel marsh dart and yellow waxtail. This species can be found in South Asian countries such as: India, Sri Lanka, Pakistan and Nepal.

== Description and habitat ==
It is a medium sized damselfly with yellowish green eyes. Its thorax is olive green above and yellowish green on the sides. Its abdomen is yellow. Its anal appendages are citron-yellow or ochreous, the inferiors tipped with black. The superiors are sub-quadrate as seen from above, with the corners gently rounded. The inferiors are sloped strongly upwards, broad at base, then tapering rapidly to an acute point. Female is more robust and dull colored. Its thorax is more greenish and abdomen is golden yellow to brown.

It breeds in weedy ponds, ditches, and rice fields.

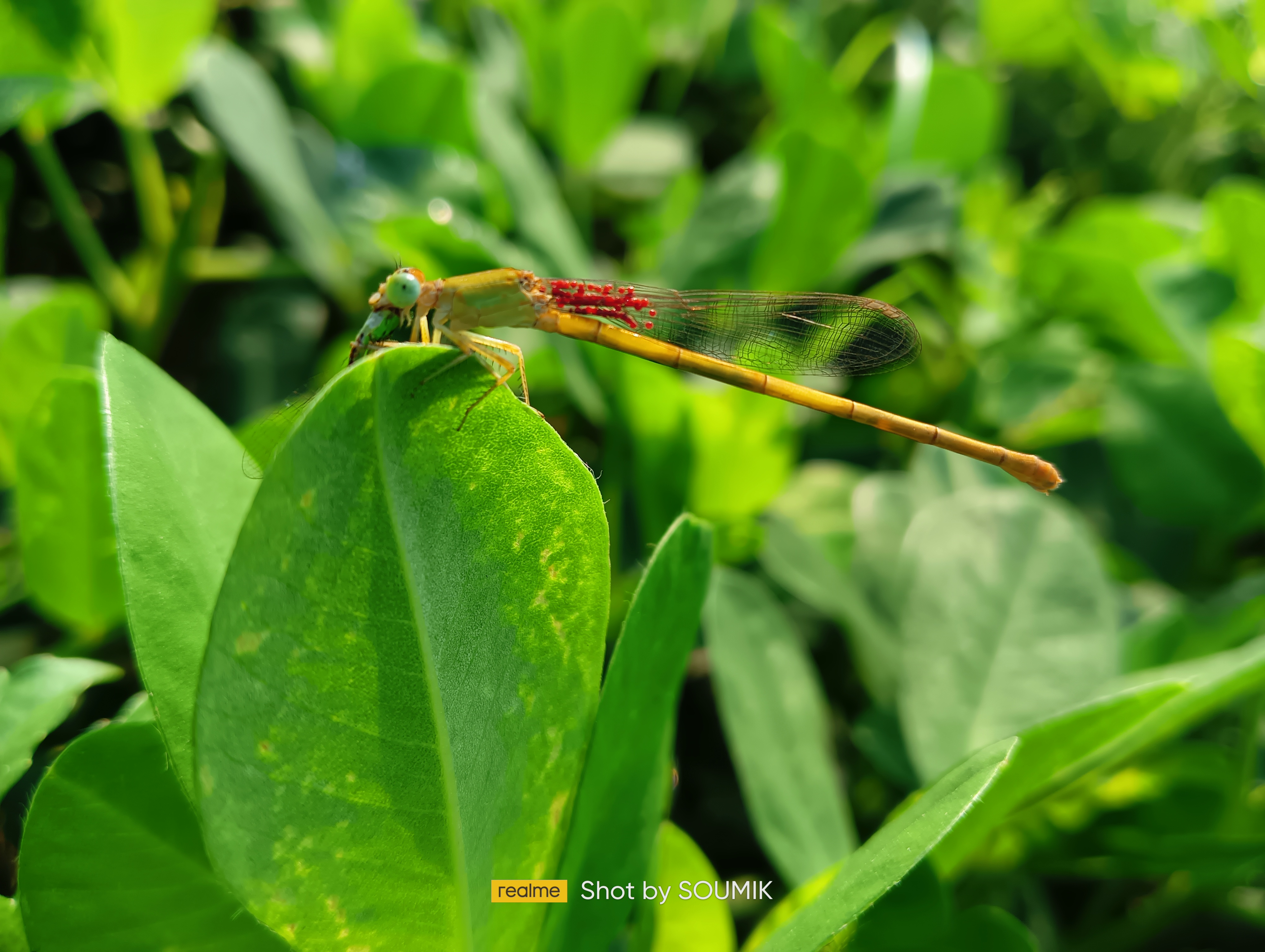
Ceriagrion coromandelianum damselfly infested with Hydracarina mites

== See also ==
- List of odonates of India
- List of odonates of Sri Lanka
- List of odonata of Kerala
