= Ceriagrion varians =

Conservation status
- Least Concern (IUCN 3.1)

Scientific classification
- Kingdom: Animalia
- Phylum: Arthropoda
- Class: Insecta
- Order: Odonata
- Suborder: Zygoptera
- Family: Coenagrionidae
- Genus: Ceriagrion
- Species: C. varians

Binomial name
- Ceriagrion varians Fraser, 1941

Species of damselfly

Ceriagrion varians is a species of damselfly in the family Coenagrionidae. It is found in Angola, Cameroon, the Republic of the Congo, the Democratic Republic of the Congo, Ivory Coast, Guinea, Guinea-Bissau, Kenya, Nigeria, Uganda, and Zambia. Its natural habitats are subtropical or tropical moist lowland forests, subtropical or tropical swamps, shrub-dominated wetlands, freshwater marshes, and intermittent freshwater marshes.
