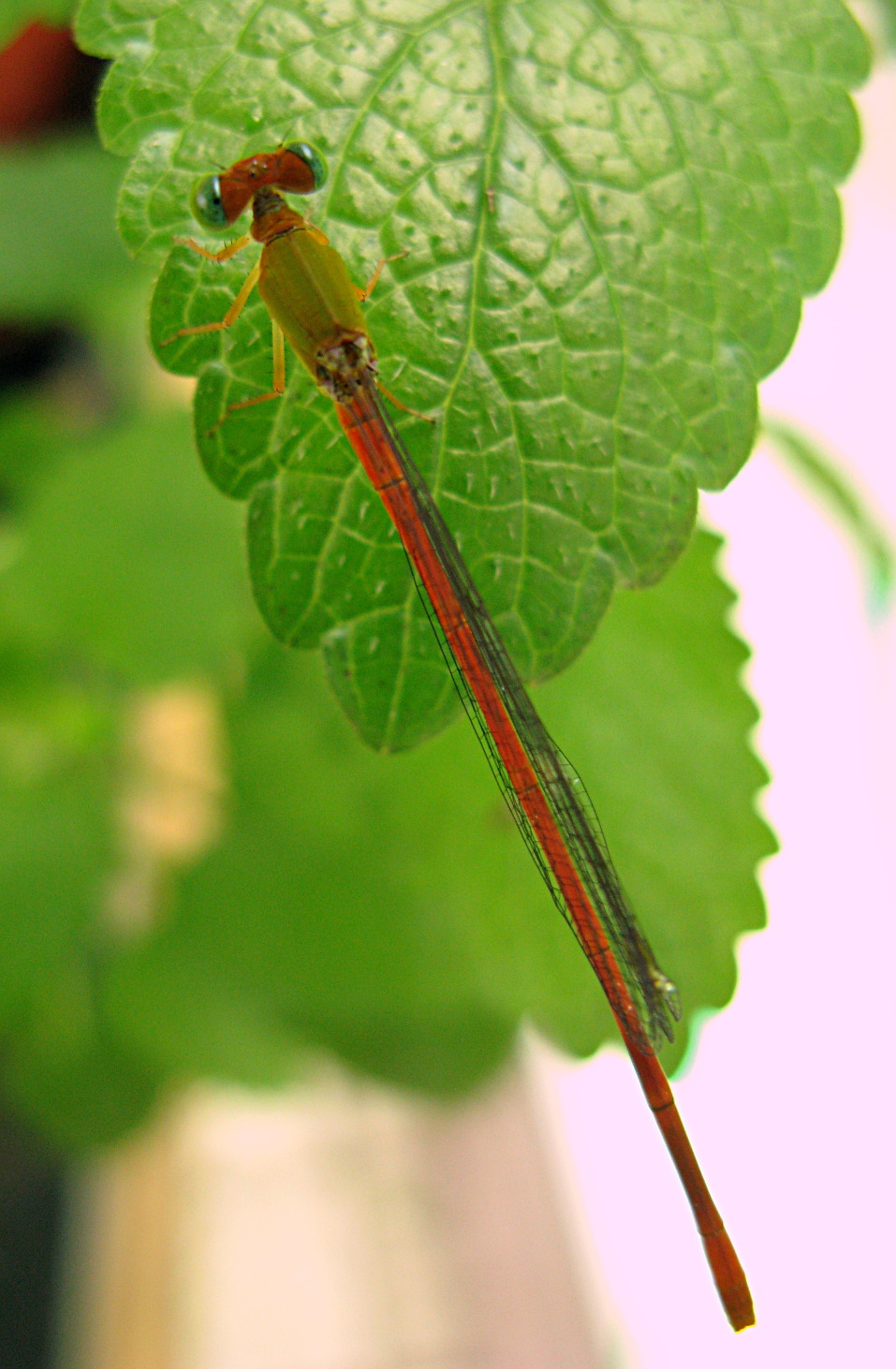

Conservation status
- Least Concern (IUCN 3.1)

Scientific classification
- Kingdom: Animalia
- Phylum: Arthropoda
- Clade: Pancrustacea
- Class: Insecta
- Order: Odonata
- Suborder: Zygoptera
- Family: Coenagrionidae
- Genus: Ceriagrion
- Species: C. auranticum

Binomial name
- Ceriagrion auranticum Fraser, 1922

Synonyms
- Ceriagrion latericium Lieftinck, 1951

= Ceriagrion auranticum =

Species of damselfly

Ceriagrion auranticum is a species of damselfly in the family Coenagrionidae. it is commonly known as orange-tailed sprite. This species can be found in south and southeast Asia.

Fraser described this species in 1922. Hämäläinen (1987) considered Ceriagrion latericium Lieftinck, 1951, described from Sumatra, as a junior synonym of C. auranticum.

It breeds in slow running streams, ponds, and swamps.

== See also ==
- List of odonates of India
- List of odonata of Kerala
