= Ceriagrion moorei =

Conservation status
- Least Concern (IUCN 3.1)

Scientific classification
- Domain: Eukaryota
- Kingdom: Animalia
- Phylum: Arthropoda
- Class: Insecta
- Order: Odonata
- Suborder: Zygoptera
- Family: Coenagrionidae
- Genus: Ceriagrion
- Species: C. moorei

Binomial name
- Ceriagrion moorei Longfield, 1952

Species of damselfly

Ceriagrion moorei is a species of damselfly in the family Coenagrionidae. It is found in Kenya and Uganda. Its natural habitats are dry savanna, moist savanna, subtropical or tropical dry shrubland, subtropical or tropical moist shrubland, rivers, freshwater marshes, and intermittent freshwater marshes.
