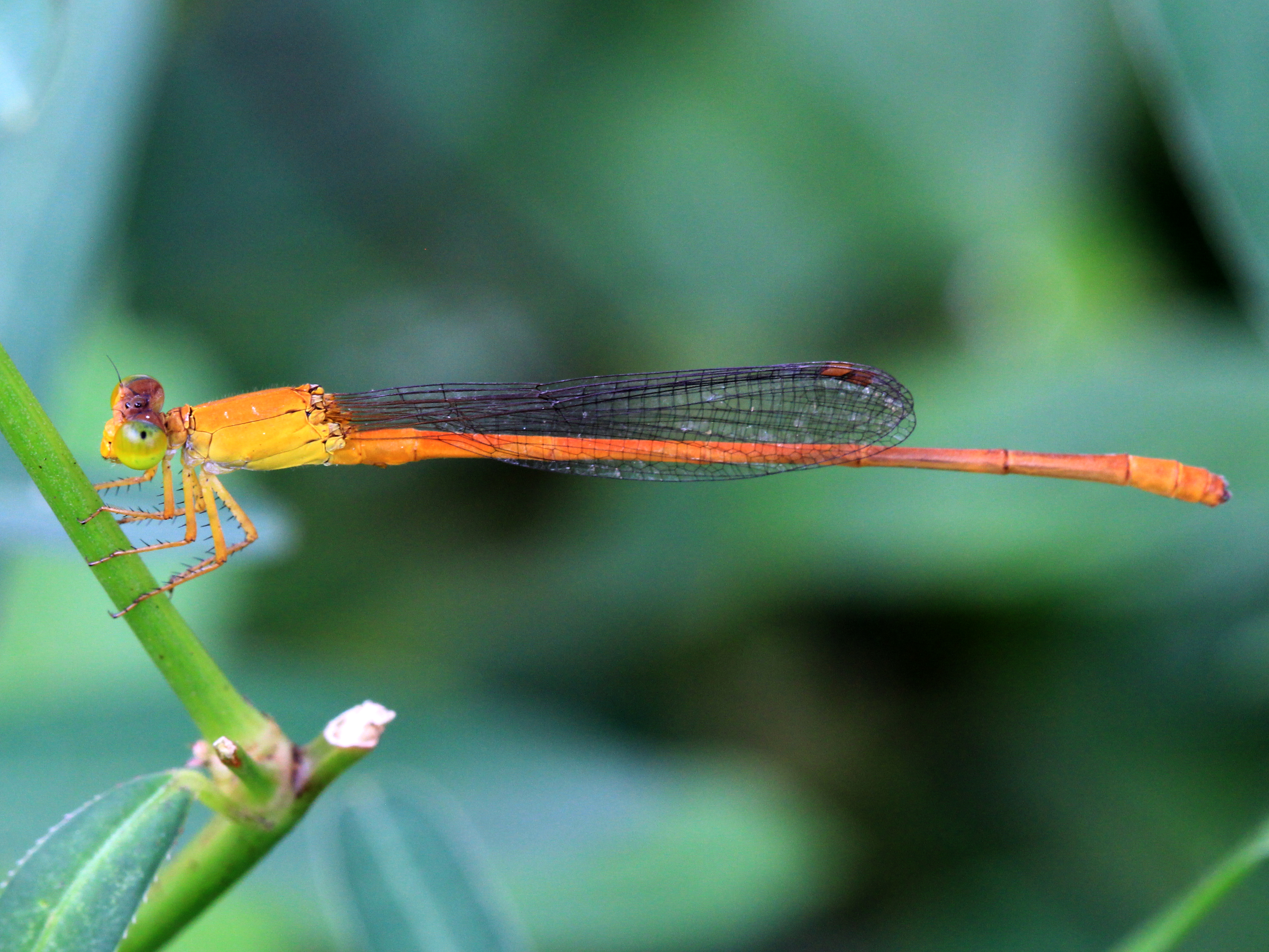
- Male

Scientific classification
- Kingdom: Animalia
- Phylum: Arthropoda
- Clade: Pancrustacea
- Class: Insecta
- Order: Odonata
- Suborder: Zygoptera
- Family: Coenagrionidae
- Genus: Ceriagrion
- Species: C. rubiae

Binomial name
- Ceriagrion rubiae Laidlaw, 1916

= Ceriagrion rubiae =

Species of damselfly

Ceriagrion rubiae is a species of damselfly in the family Coenagrionidae. it is commonly known as orange marsh dart or orange wax tail. This species can be found in south and southeast Asia.

== Description and habitat ==
It is a medium sized damselfly with olivaceous eyes. Its thorax is bright orange, paler on the sides. Its abdomen is orange on dorsum, paler on the sides. Female is similar to the males; but more robust and more pale olivaceous colors.

It breeds in marshes and weedy ponds.

== See also ==
- List of odonates of India
- List of odonates of Sri Lanka
- List of odonata of Kerala
