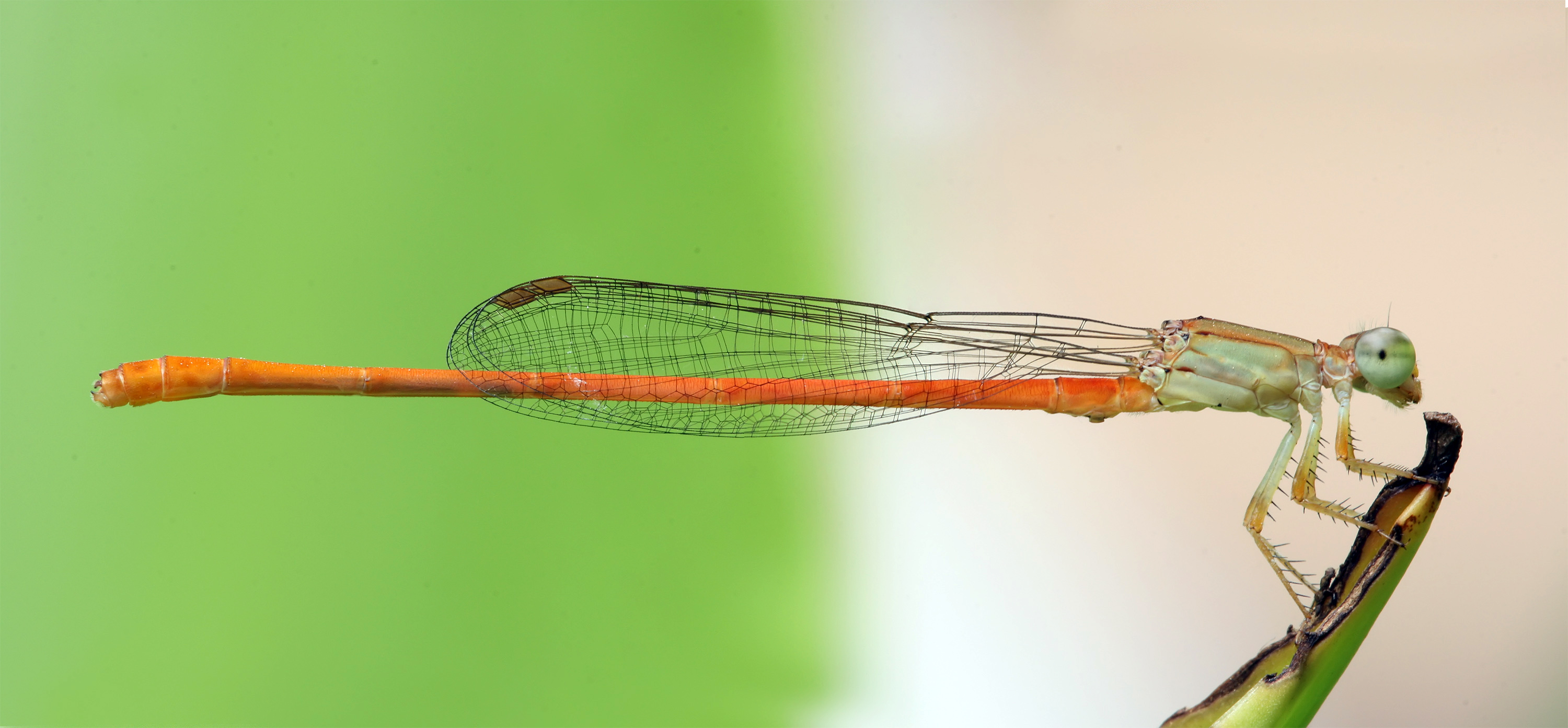
- Adult male

Conservation status
- Least Concern (IUCN 3.1)

Scientific classification
- Kingdom: Animalia
- Phylum: Arthropoda
- Class: Insecta
- Order: Odonata
- Suborder: Zygoptera
- Family: Coenagrionidae
- Genus: Ceriagrion
- Species: C. glabrum

Binomial name
- Ceriagrion glabrum (Burmeister, 1839)

Synonyms
- Agrion ferrugineum (Rambur, 1842); Agrion glabrum (Burmeister, 1839); Agrion rhomboidalis (Palisot de Beauvois, 1807); Brachybasis rhomboidalis (Kirby, 1898); Ceriagrion glabrum longispinum (Pinhey, 1963); Ceriagrion ferrugineum (Rambur, 1842)

= Ceriagrion glabrum =

Species of damselfly

Ceriagrion glabrum is a species of damselfly in the family Coenagrionidae. Its common names include common orange, common citril, common pond damsel, common waxtail, orange waxtail and gewone aljander. It is widespread in Africa, where it is found in habitats that are dominated by reeds.

== Description ==
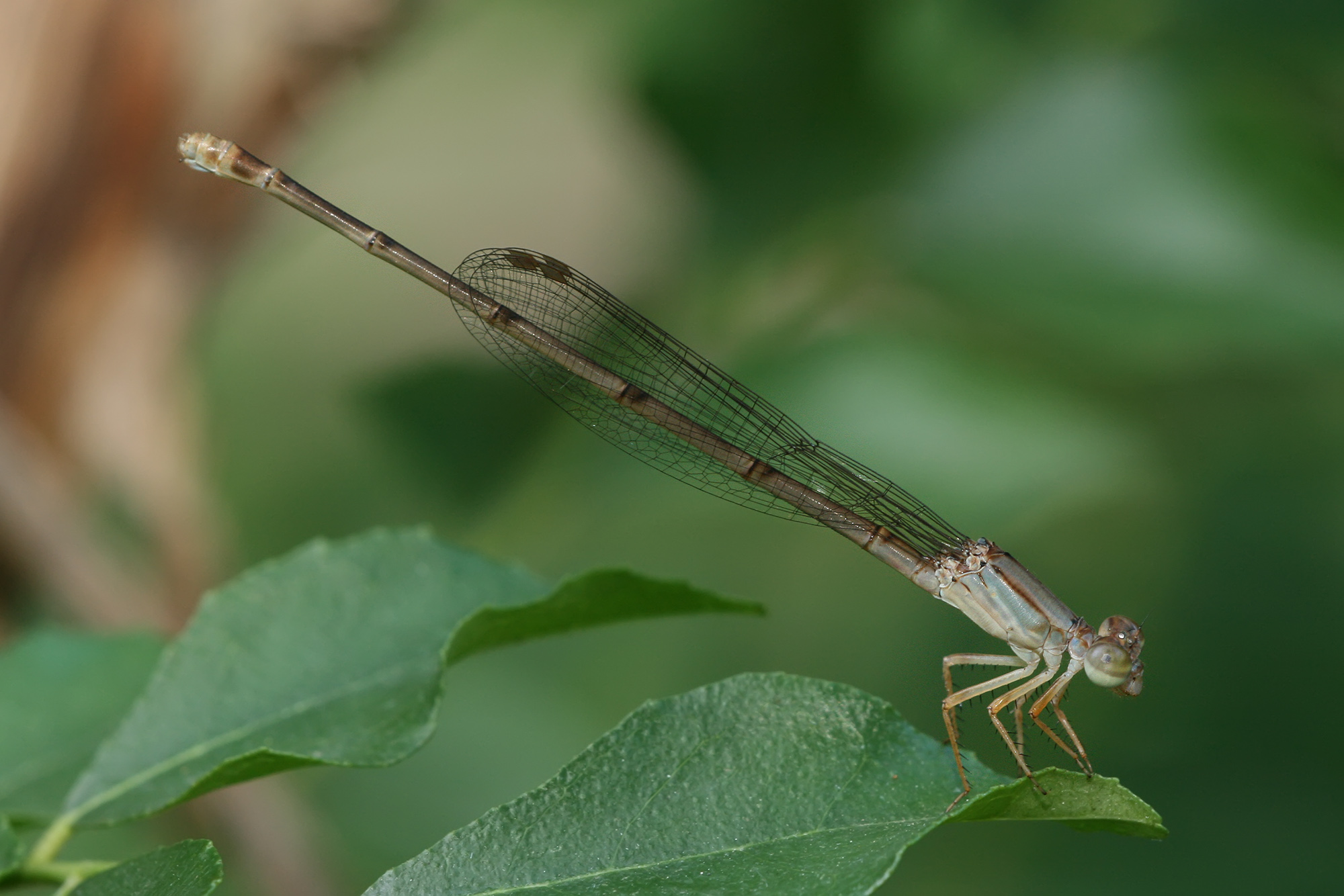
Young adult female

This is a small to medium size damselfly (length up to 46 mm (1.8 in), wingspan up to 53 mm (2.1 in)). The eyes are greenish with a dark grey cap. As is the case in many damselflies, this species shows strong sexual dimorphism. Males have a bright orange, unmarked abdomen and thorax, with a lighter yellow-orange colour on the sides of the abdomen. Females range from brown to green to orange. They become increasingly orange with age, although they never reach the same striking brightness of the males.

== Distribution and habitat ==
This is by far the most common and widespread African Ceriagrion species. It has been observed to occur in Angola, Botswana, Burkina Faso, Burundi, Cameroon, Chad, the Republic of the Congo, the Democratic Republic of the Congo, Ivory Coast, Egypt, Equatorial Guinea, Ethiopia, Gabon, Gambia, Ghana, Guinea, Kenya, Liberia, Madagascar, Malawi, Mali, Mauritius, Mozambique, Namibia, Niger, Nigeria, Réunion, São Tomé and Príncipe, Senegal, Seychelles, Sierra Leone, Somalia, South Africa, South Sudan, Tanzania, Togo, Uganda, Zambia, Zimbabwe, and probably in Sudan.

It is found in a variety of freshwater habitats, including marshes, ponds, dams, pans and the quiet backwaters of rivers and streams. It prefers sites that are rich in reeds, grasses and sedges.

== Ecology ==
This species sits and flies among the stems of reeds, grasses and sedge, mainly making use of low perches near the water. Adults are only capable of short, weak flight. While they are mostly found at water, they are also frequently found some distance away. It can be a fierce predator of other, smaller damselflies, particularly when they are young and still soft bodied.

== Conservation ==
This species is listed as least concern by the IUCN. It is highly adaptable and readily utilises suitable artificial habitats, such as dams.
