= Shambhala School =

Private school in Halifax, Nova Scotia, Canada

Hydrostone Academy
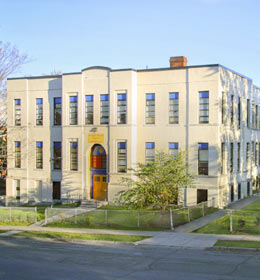
- The Hydrostone Academy

Location
- 5450 Russell Street; Halifax, Nova Scotia, B3K 1W9; Canada; 44.661550°N 63.596408°W

Information
- School type: Private Elementary/Middle/High School
- Motto: Genuine Delight in Learning
- Established: 1993
- School board: Private
- Category: School
- Grades: Preprimary - Grade 12
- Enrollment: Approx. 150
- Language: English
- Hours in school day: 9 to 3
- Area: HRM
- Colours: Blue, Gold, and Yellow
- Director of Hydrostone Academy: Mary Acton-Bond
- Website: https://www.hydrostoneacademy.org/

The Hydrostone Academy (previously called the Shambhala School) is a non-denominational private school in Halifax, Nova Scotia based on principles. It employs a creative curriculum, integrating both academics and art. It runs from pre-primary through grade 12.

== Beginnings ==
In 1993, some parents of the Halifax community who were concerned with Nova Scotia's public school system set out to create a new school which they hoped would create a more caring and nurturing environment for learning. Based upon this conception, the new school began as a private entity.

== Curriculum and learning styles ==
Although Hydrostone Academy is not a religious school, the school does use eastern meditation techniques every day to encourage learning and expansion of the mind. For younger students (primary - grade 5) this might include movement and awareness activities. For the older grades (grade 6 - 12) this includes 5 to 15 minutes of simple yoga each morning and 5 minutes of Shambhala sitting meditation every morning and before dismissal. Usually on the morning returning from each major break (i.e., winter and March breaks) the entire upper school participates in an approximately hour-long yoga session followed by sitting meditation.

== Extracurricular activities ==
Each year, the Upper Grades (9 to 12) attend a camping trip in September to Kejimkujik National Park in South Central Nova Scotia. It is usually about a 3-day trip and includes bike trips, hiking, canoeing, kayaking, camp fires, swimming, large games of capture the flag/track down/manhunt, tenting, playing of musical instruments, and much more. The group usually consists of between 15-35 people and includes teachers, and students. The Group eats communally of 3 meals a day and smaller groups take turns cooking and cleaning. Many Students and Faculty members claim this is an excellent way to bring the school closer and creates a community.

In addition to the "Keji" outing, each class attends a trip each year to Redtail Nature Camp. The Camp is located in Pictou County, Nova Scotia and has approximately 150 acres (0.61 km^{2}) of forested land. The Camp activities include much hiking, camp fires, nature/educational games, nature spotting, tracking, guided meditation, pseudo-Aboriginal rituals such as smudging and sweat lodge, swimming and much more.

Every year, around Canadian Thanksgiving time, the school organizes the "Turkey Trot". This raises money for under-privileged families in the community to receive Turkeys and other foods for Thanksgiving.

Due to the small population on a school based level, Shambhala and other Private schools (e.g. Sacred Heart School of Halifax) have teamed up to conduct dances. This is usually open to 6-9 grades and sometimes 10-12 respectively. Each student is allowed 1-2 guests from any school (even public).

== Facilities ==
The Hydrostone Academy is currently housed in the former Alexander Mckay School building in the Hydrostone area of Halifax. Built in 1916, the building withstood the Halifax Explosion. The school has three floors and a mezzanine including the basement area. Prior to the acquisition of the facility by The Hydrostone Academy, it was purchased by Cochran Entertainment and used as a production studio for the children’s television series, Theodore Tugboat.

The bottom floor has a small carpeted room sometimes used for music-now used for drama equipment, a large open space used for concerts, circles and other activities like restrooms, a utility room, a canteen room with a kitchenette and a large room formerly used for art and aikido, and now used for large gatherings. The basement also includes a gymnasium with hardwood flooring. The gym also has a stage used for concerts and plays.

The mezzanine includes a number of classrooms (currently used for music and visual art) and a staff room. The music room includes a resident drum kit, keyboards, stereo and no PA system. The art room includes, among the many mediums, a number of pottery wheels and a kiln.

The first floor mainly houses the elementary classes as well as a preschool. The top floor houses the older grades (6 to 12). This includes many more classrooms, a kitchen/lunchroom (which doubles as a classroom in some cases). There is also an outdoor classroom made of a sustainable material which was an exercise by architecture students from Dalhousie University.

== Notable alumni ==
- Elliot Page, Academy Award-nominated actor

== See also ==
- Shambhala
- Shambhala Buddhism
- Hydrostone Academy Website
