= Redtail Nature Awareness =

Coordinates: 45°37′26″N 62°57′50″W

Redtail Nature Awareness is a Canadian nature retreat and wilderness education centre located near Scotsburn, Nova Scotia.

== History ==
In 1991, Redtail was founded by a husband and wife team concerned about environmental degradation. The Redtail Nature Awareness camp was established to provide a retreat and educational opportunity to inspire and teach all ages about nature, spirituality and humble living.

Billy MacDonald

Billy is an environmental educator and mentor. Billy has worked with traditional Native Americans and in Inuit communities. He has studied tracking and spiritual teaching and the teachings of deep ecology.

Nova Annette Poirier

Nova worked mainly in the field of counseling and psychology prior to working with Redtail. Nova is involved in the study and practice of Shamanism.

== Programs ==
Redtail offers a whole host of programs and many of them are specialized. During the summer for youths, there are 4 basic programs. A program for 8- to 12-year-olds, a program for 13+ who have not attended Redtail before, a 13+ for previous attendees of Redtail and a solo quest program for 16- to 20-year-olds.

There are also about five adult programs that change yearly.

In addition to the fixed programs, public and private schools attend Redtail programs throughout the year. Most notably The Shambhala School has attended for nearly a decade.

The programs include meditation, nature education, smudging ceremonies, hiking, swimming, tracking and other related activities.

== See also ==
- http://www.redtailnatureawareness.ca/
- Shambhala School
