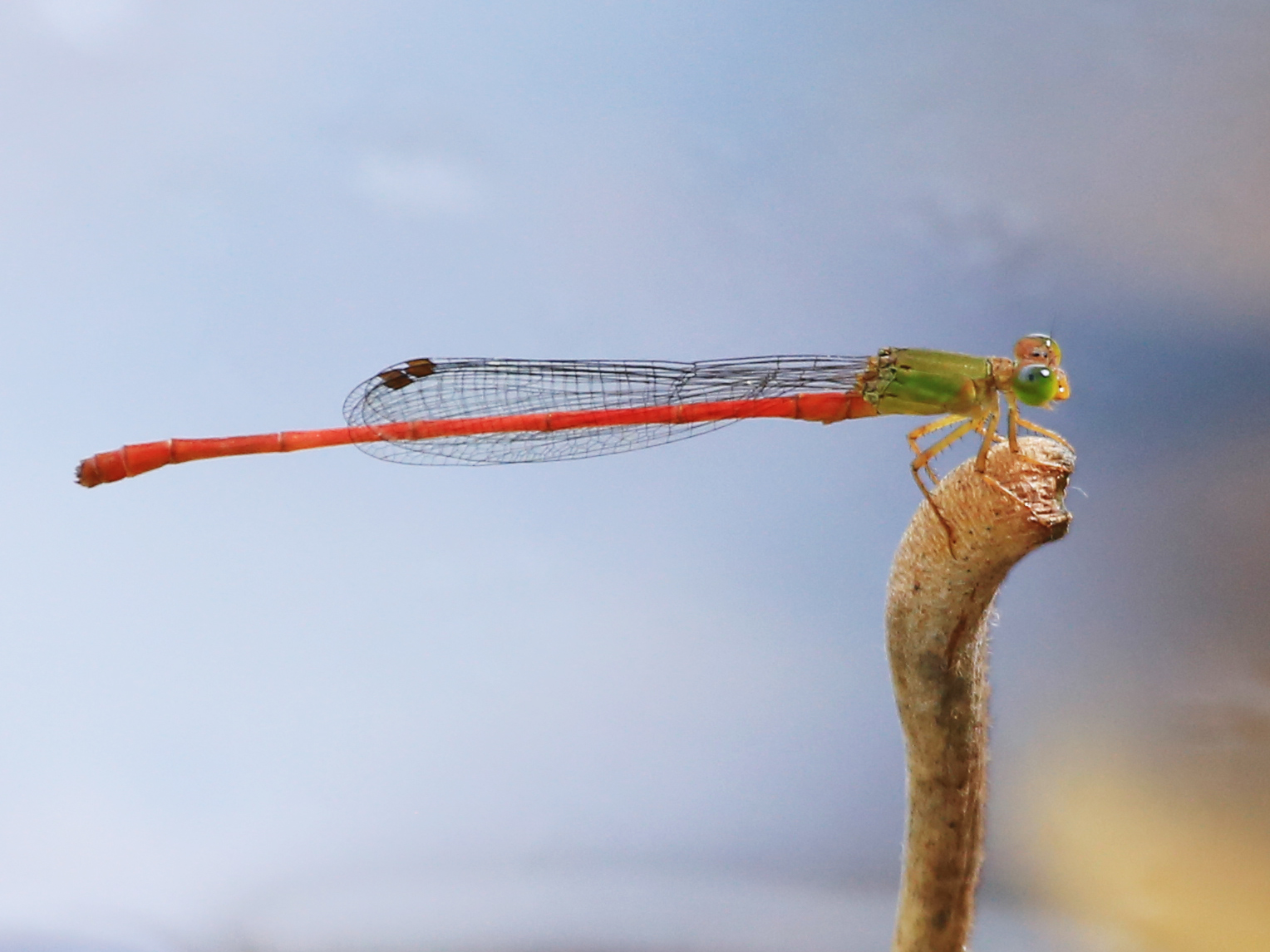
- Redtail in Cairns, Queensland

Conservation status
- Least Concern (IUCN 3.1)

Scientific classification
- Kingdom: Animalia
- Phylum: Arthropoda
- Clade: Pancrustacea
- Class: Insecta
- Order: Odonata
- Suborder: Zygoptera
- Family: Coenagrionidae
- Genus: Ceriagrion
- Species: C. aeruginosum

Binomial name
- Ceriagrion aeruginosum (Brauer, 1869)

Synonyms
- Agrion aeruginosum Brauer, 1869 Ceriagrion erubescens Selys, 1891

= Ceriagrion aeruginosum =

Species of damselfly

Ceriagrion aeruginosum is a species of damselfly in the family Coenagrionidae. Its common name is redtail. It is found in Indonesia, the Moluccas, New Guinea, Australia and possibly the Solomon Islands.

Natural habitats of Ceriagrion aeruginosum are freshwater swamps, ponds and slow moving streams. Adult males are medium-sized damselflies (wingspan 50mm, length 45mm), mostly red with their synthorax becoming pale green as they mature. In Australia, their distribution is in suitable habitat in the north-west and north-eastern part of the continent from about Broome to the south-eastern Queensland border.

Ceriagrion aeruginosum has been assessed as least concern 3.1 in the IUCN Red List.

== Etymology ==
The genus name Ceriagrion is derived from the Latin cerinus ("wax-coloured"), combined with Agrion, a genus name derived from the Greek ἄγριος (agrios, "wild"). Agrion was the name given in 1775 by Johan Christian Fabricius for all damselflies.

The species name aeruginosum is derived from the Latin aeruginosus ("verdigris-coloured" or "rusty"), referring to the brownish colouring of the thorax, legs and top of the head.

== Gallery ==
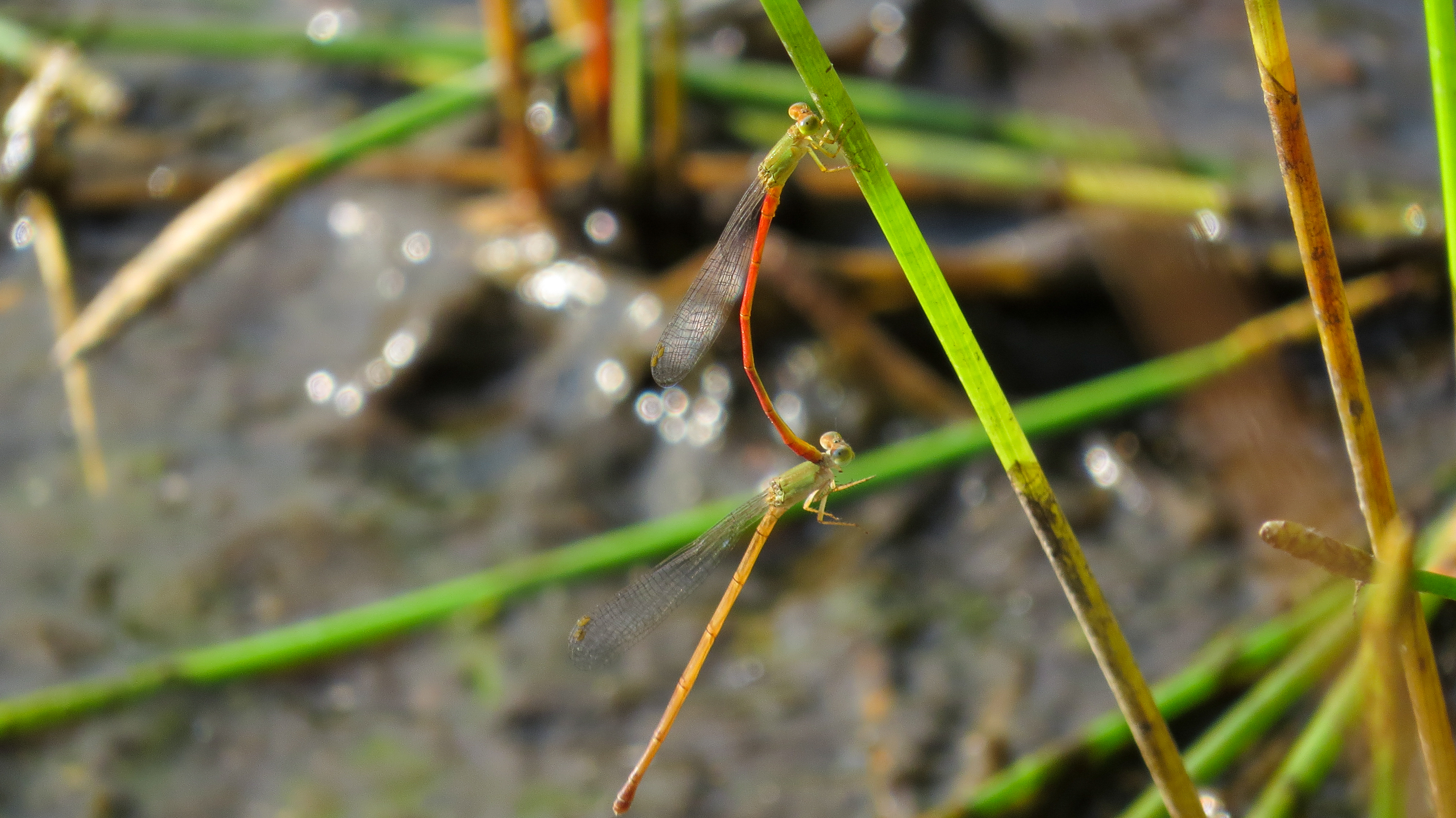
Mating pair

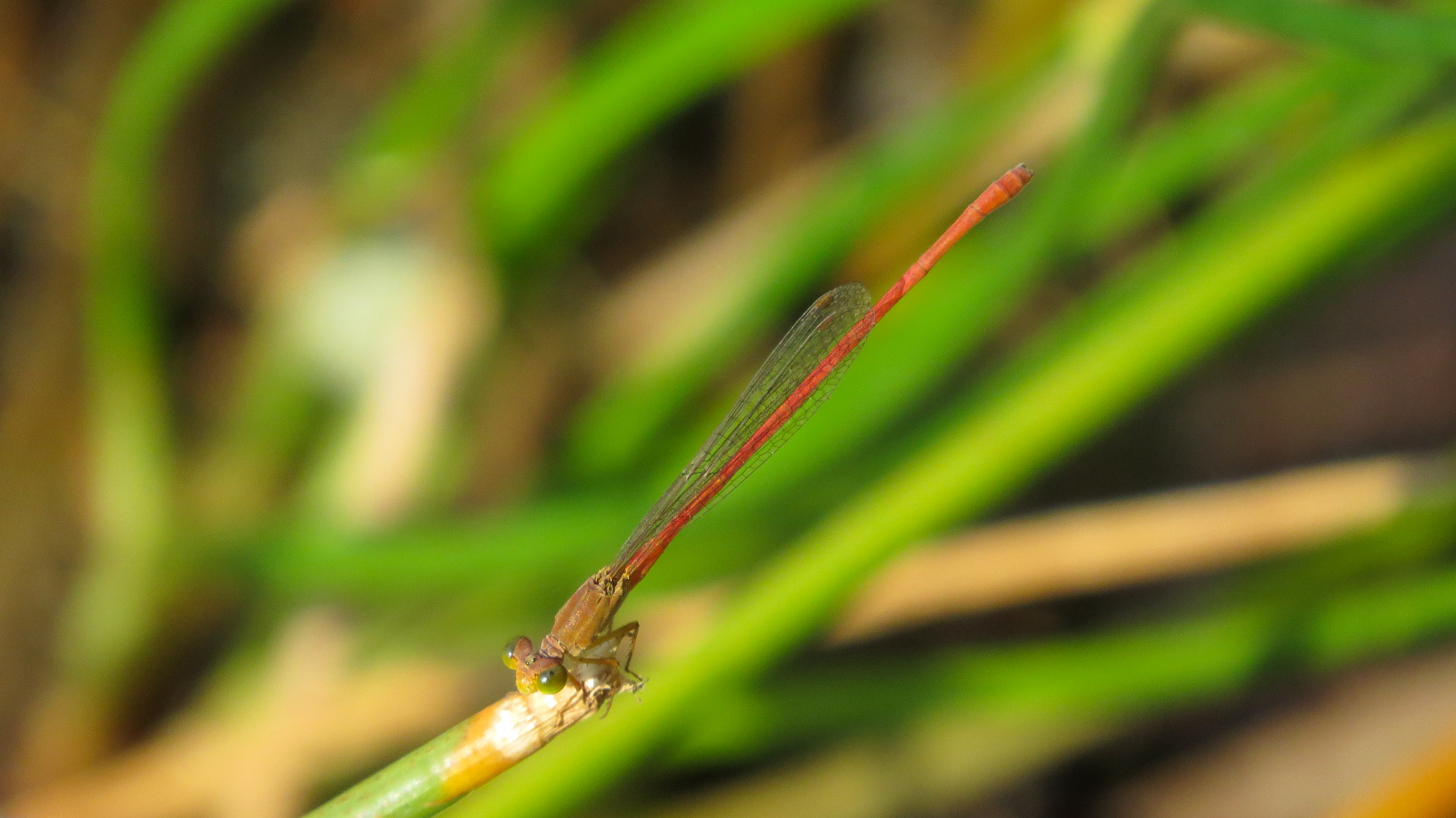
Male from above

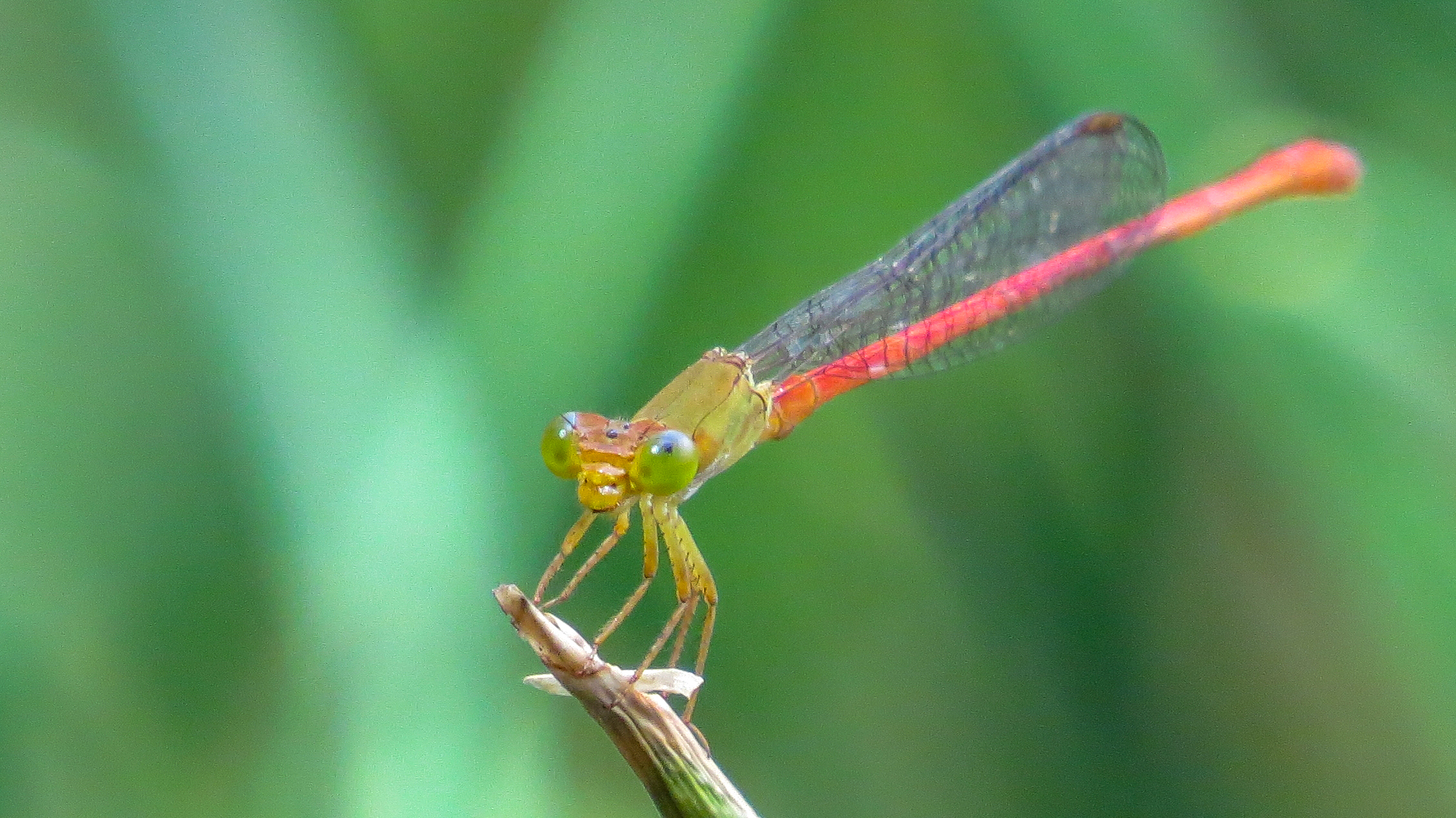
Male face

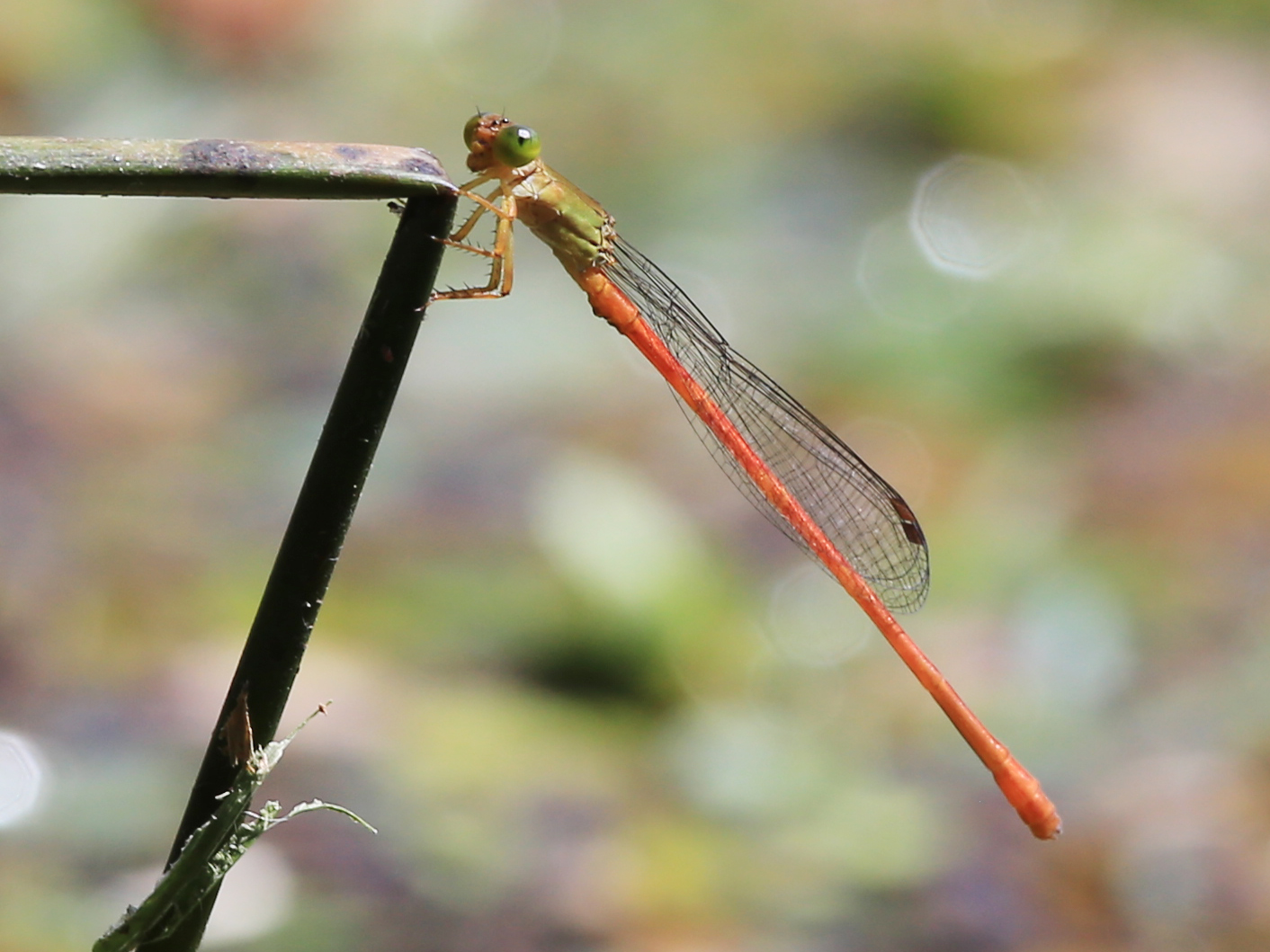
male, Cairns

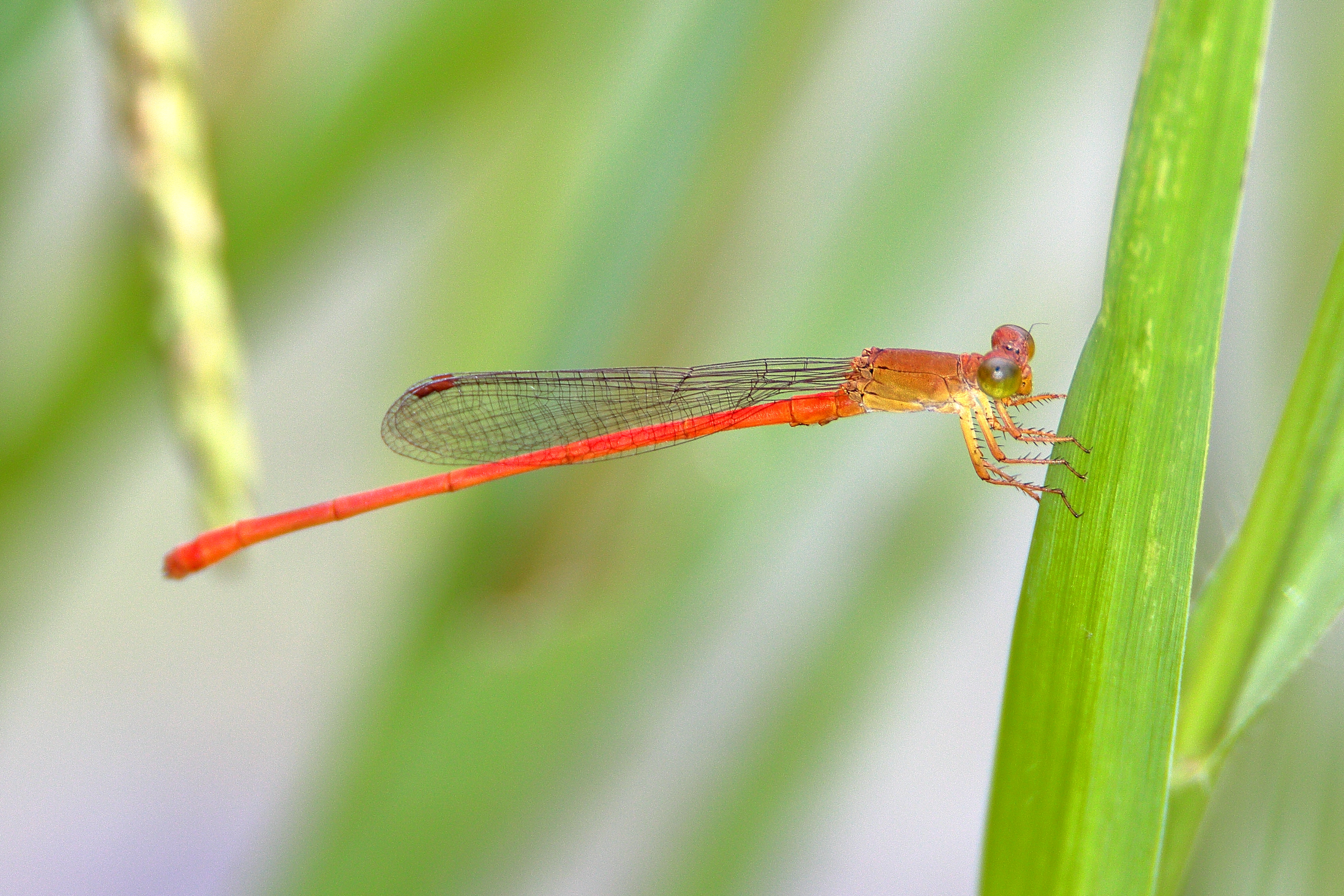
male, Cairns

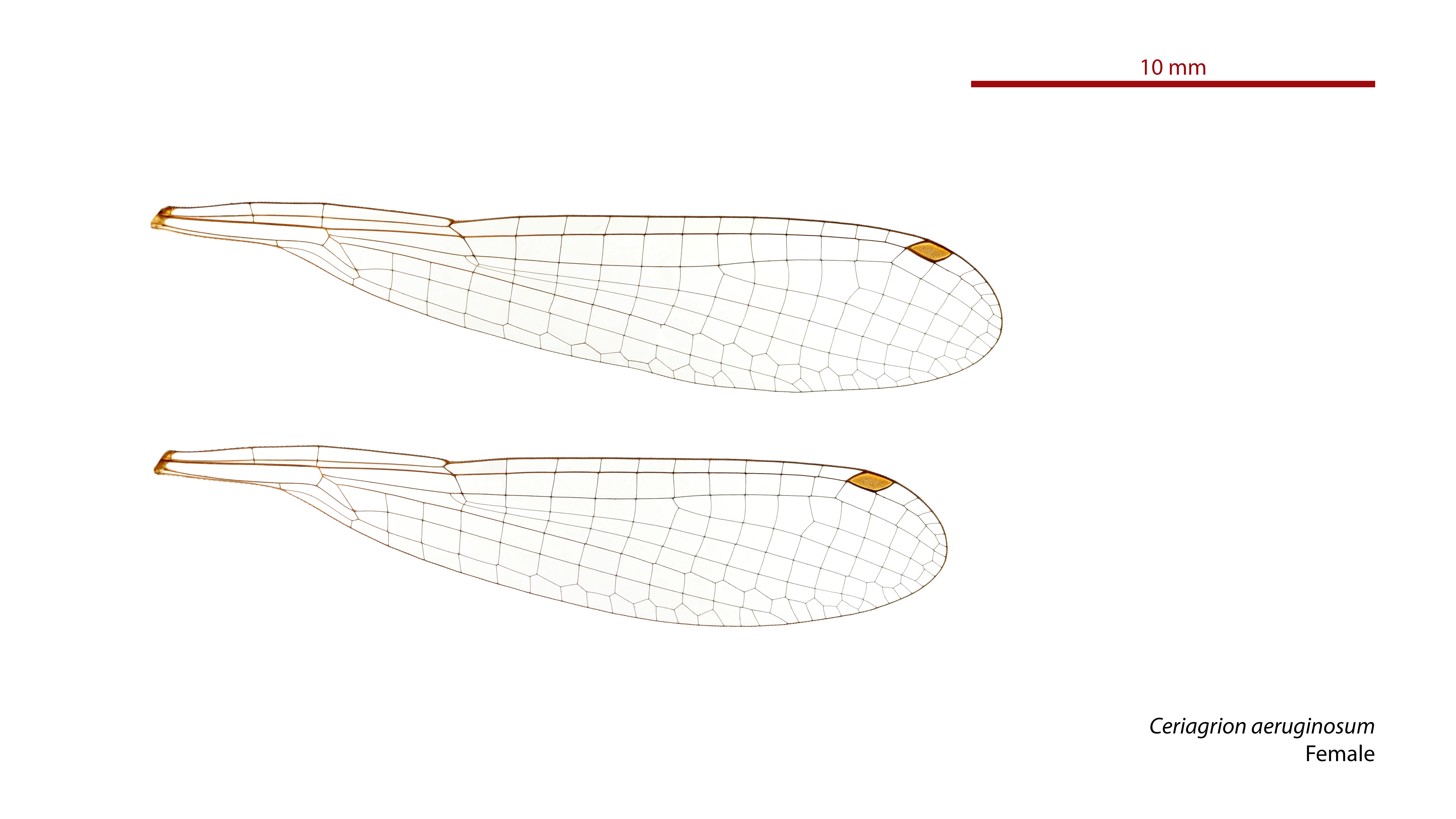
Female wings

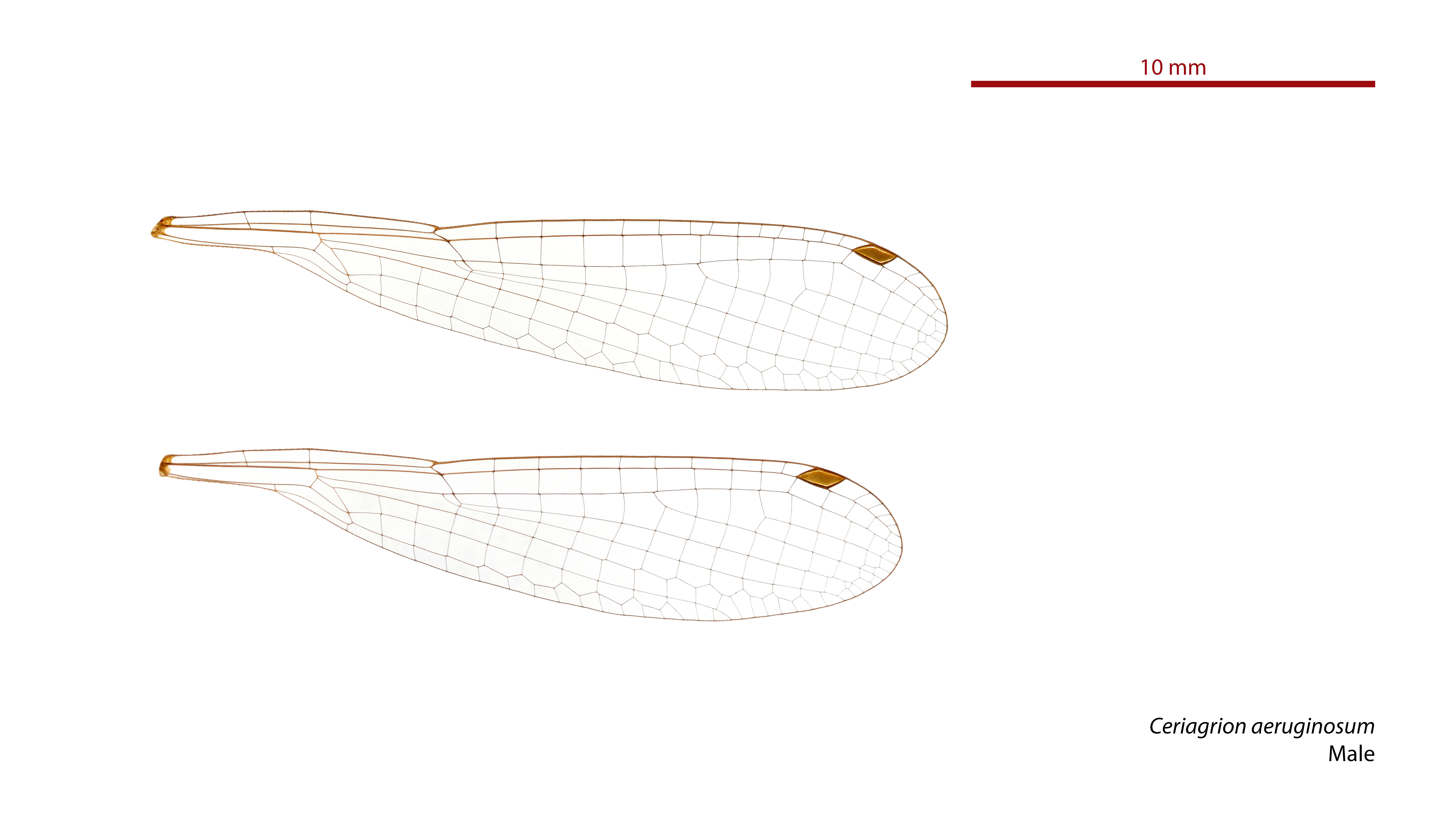
Male wings

== See also ==
- List of Odonata species of Australia
