= Redtail Telematics Corporation =

- Company type: Private
- Industry: Telematics product and services
- Founded: October 2010
- Headquarters: Cambridge, UK; San Diego, US
- Area served: Worldwide

Redtail Telematics is a provider of GPS enabled fleet tracking products. The company is based in North America with headquarters in the United Kingdom.

== Features ==
Redtail's products use a technology solution known as VAM (Vehicle Asset Management) which includes features such as:

1) sensors 2) Onboard diagnostics 3) Vehicle status engine detection 4) GPS jamming/tamper protection alerts

== Partnerships ==
The company's technology is provided by Plextek Limited, with which it has a strategic design partnership.

As of 2015, it has partnered with insurance provider Admiral.
