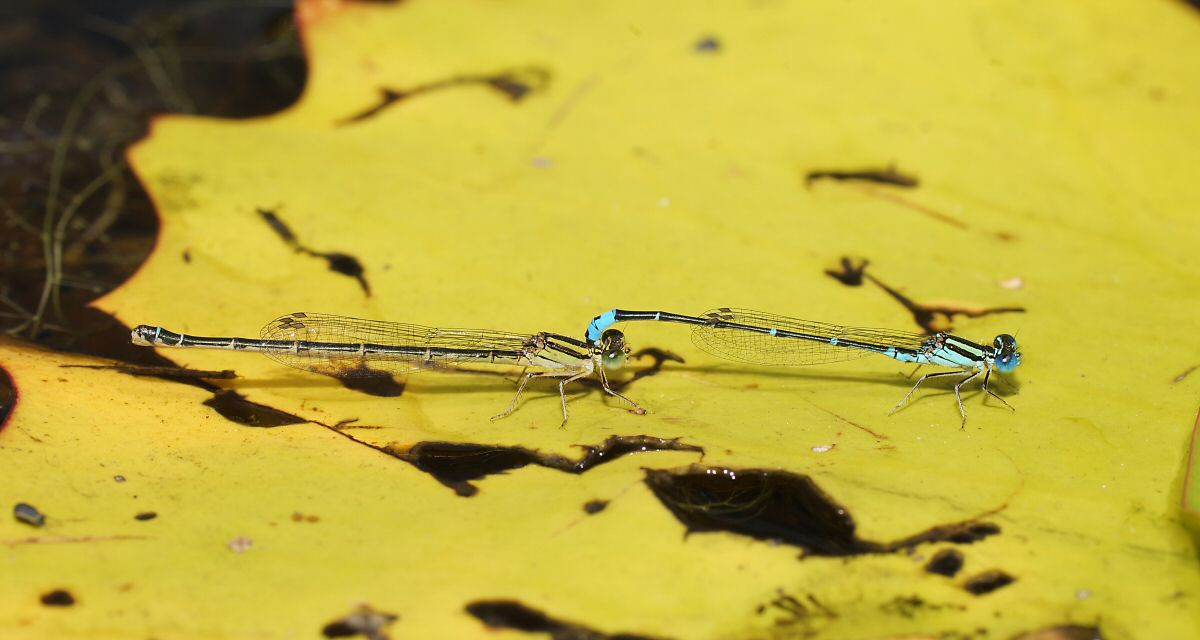

Conservation status
- Least Concern (IUCN 3.1)

Scientific classification
- Kingdom: Animalia
- Phylum: Arthropoda
- Clade: Pancrustacea
- Class: Insecta
- Order: Odonata
- Suborder: Zygoptera
- Family: Coenagrionidae
- Genus: Austroagrion
- Species: A. watsoni

Binomial name
- Austroagrion watsoni Lieftinck, 1982

= Eastern billabongfly =

Species of damselfly

The eastern billabongfly (Austroagrion watsoni) is a damselfly in the family Coenagrionidae. It is also known as the eastern dart. Eastern billabongflies are small damselflies about 25mm (1 inch) in length. They are found near slow running water or still water, such as lakes, ponds and ditches. Male and female eastern billabongflies mate in a wheel position.

== Identification ==
The male eastern billabongfly has a bright blue thorax with black markings, and a long and slender black abdomen with blue rings and a blue tip. The female is a similar size to the male and is pale blue to grayish-green in colour. The antehumeral stripe of the female is a contrastingly bright green.

== Behaviour ==
Eastern billabongflies usually rest on plants either in a pond or at the waters edge, and sit very close to the water surface. They are relatively quick flyers.

== Similar species ==
Eastern billabongflies appear similar to common bluetails and blue riverdamsels. Eastern billabongflies are smaller. Eastern billabongflies have a blue bar just behind their eyes where the common bluetail has two blue spots. The tips of the tails of eastern billabongflies have two black squares, whereas the common bluetail and blue riverdamsel tails are all blue. Eastern billabongflies have a green antehumeral stripe, where the common bluetail has a blue stripe. The eyes of an eastern billabongfly are mostly uniformly coloured, whereas common bluetails have bi-coloured eyes.

== Distribution ==
Eastern billabongflies are found throughout northern and eastern Australia, New Guinea, as well as on New Caledonia in the Pacific.

== Etymology ==
The genus name Austroagrion combines the prefix austro- (from Latin auster, meaning "south wind", hence "southern") with Agrion, a genus name derived from Greek ἄγριος (agrios, "wild"). Austroagrion thus refers to a southern representative of that group.

In 1982, Maurits Lieftinck named this species watsoni, an eponym honouring Tony Watson (1935–1993), in recognition of his contributions to the study of Australian dragonflies.

== Gallery ==
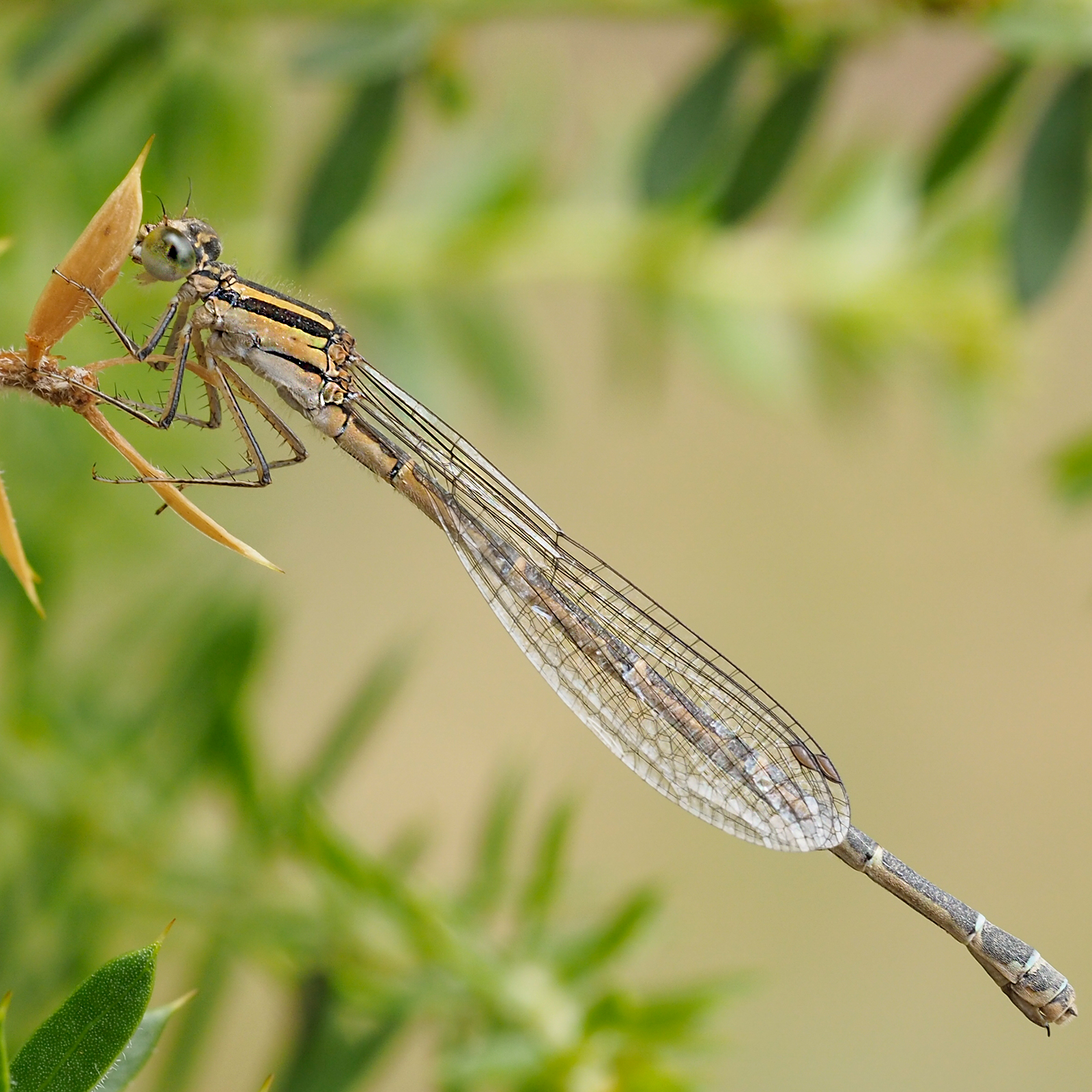
Female

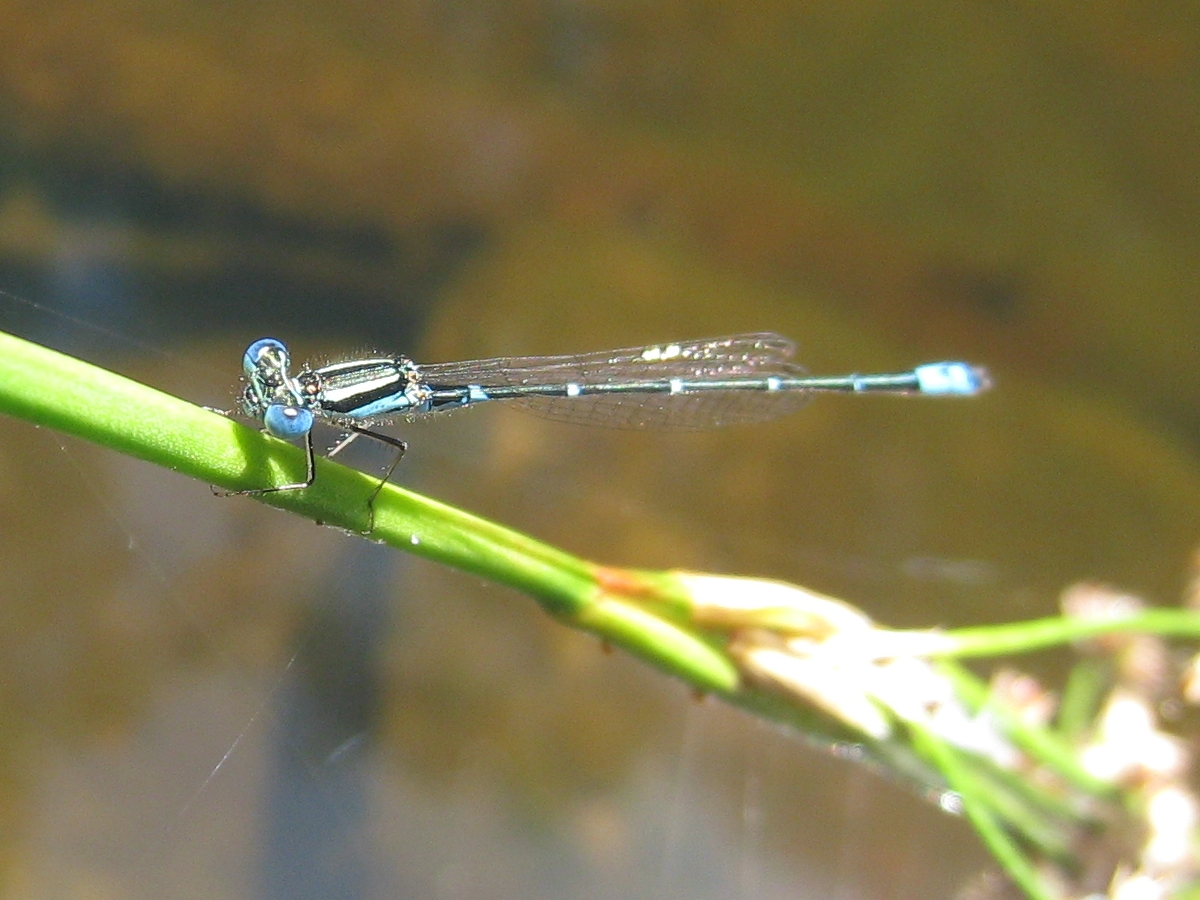
Male

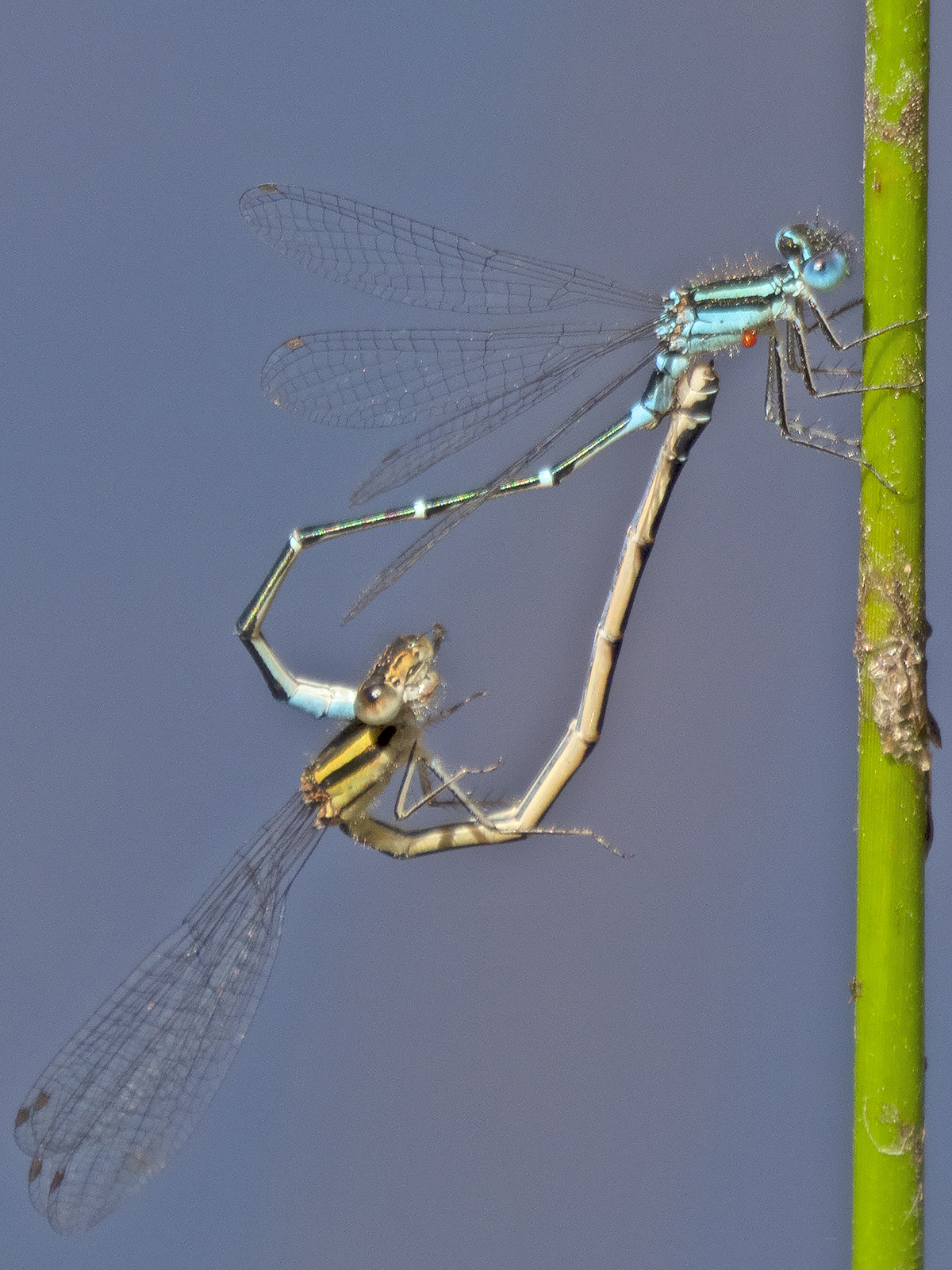
mating pair

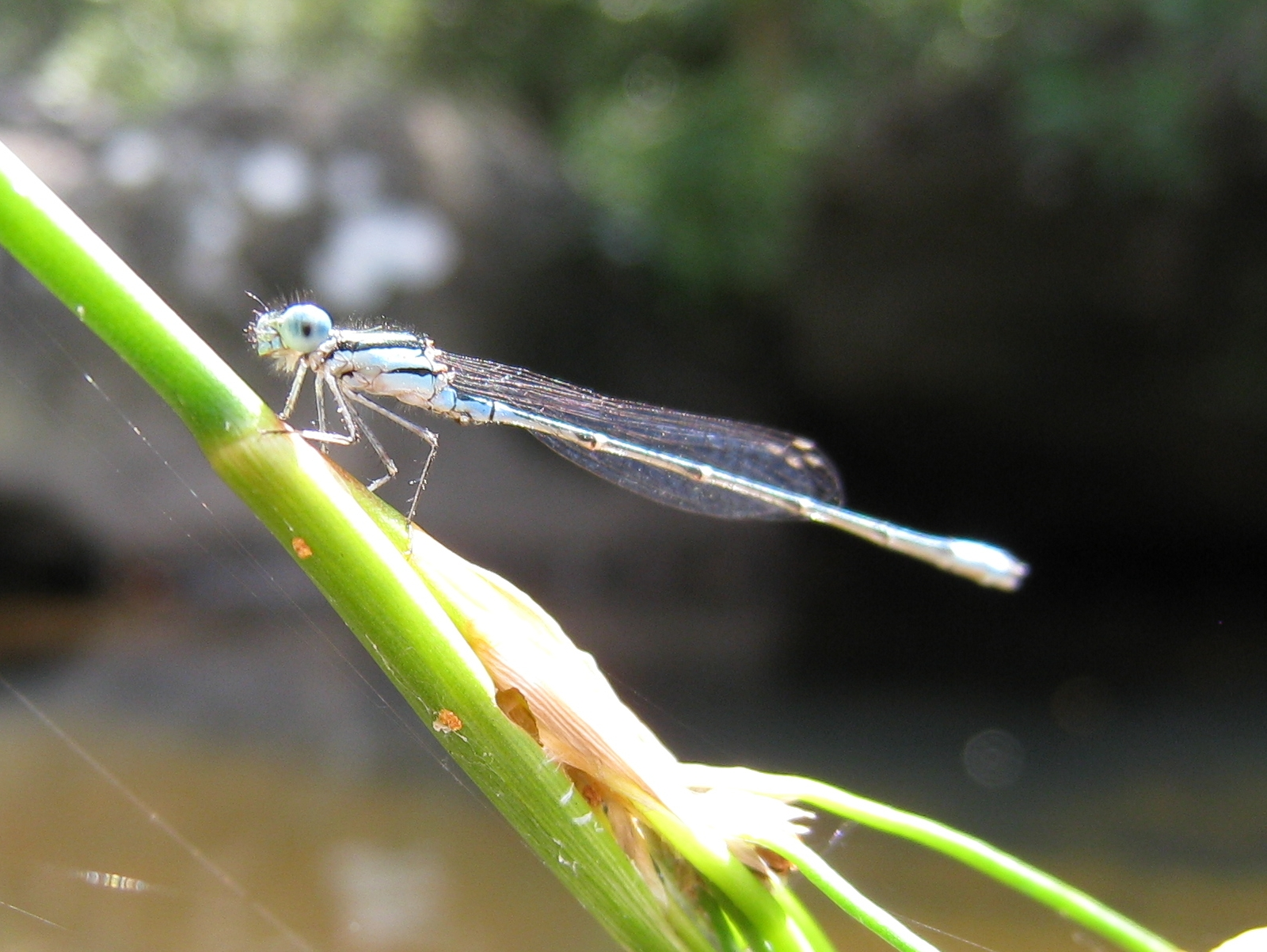
An eastern billabongfly has a blue tail tip with two black marks

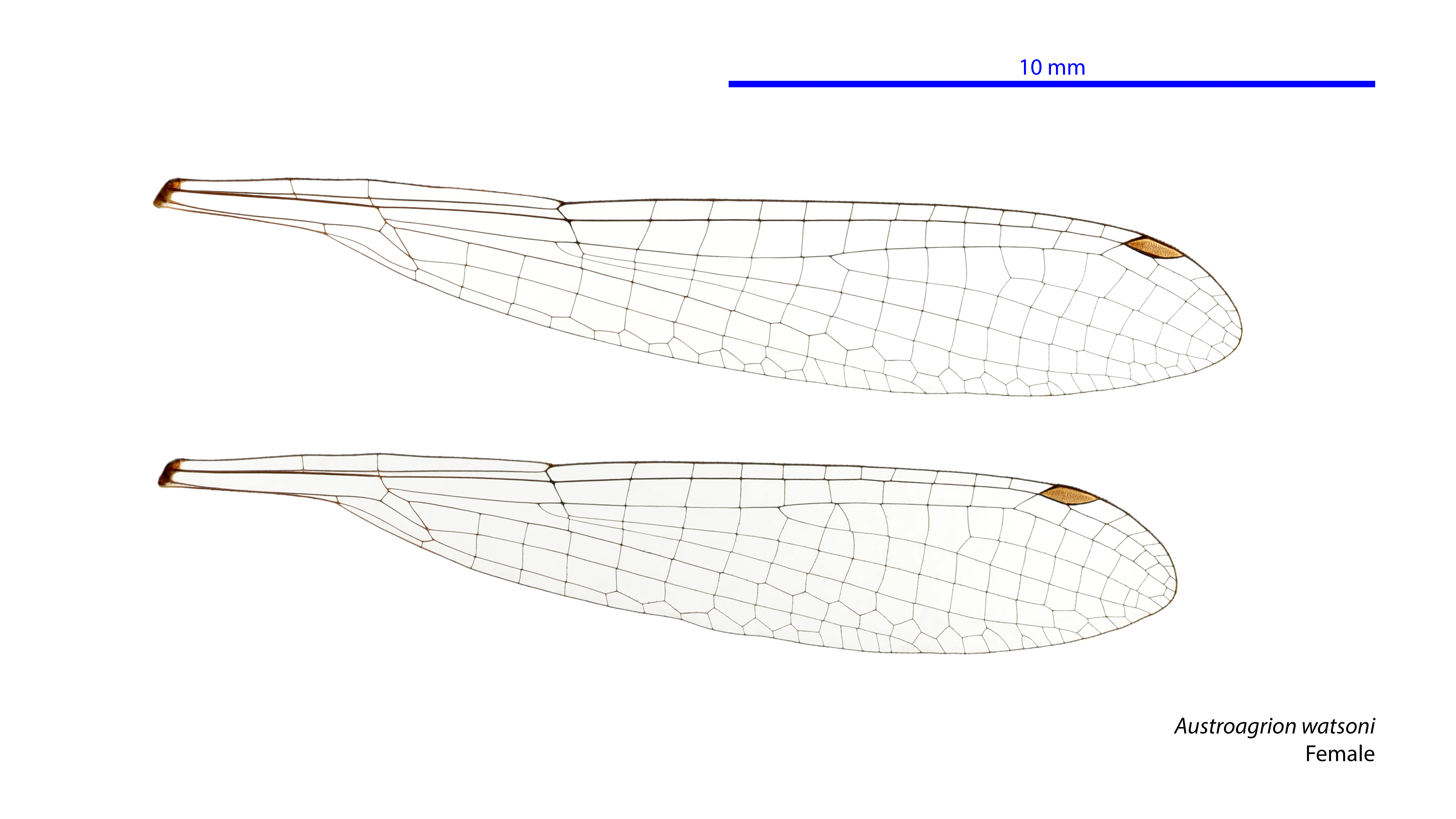
Female wings

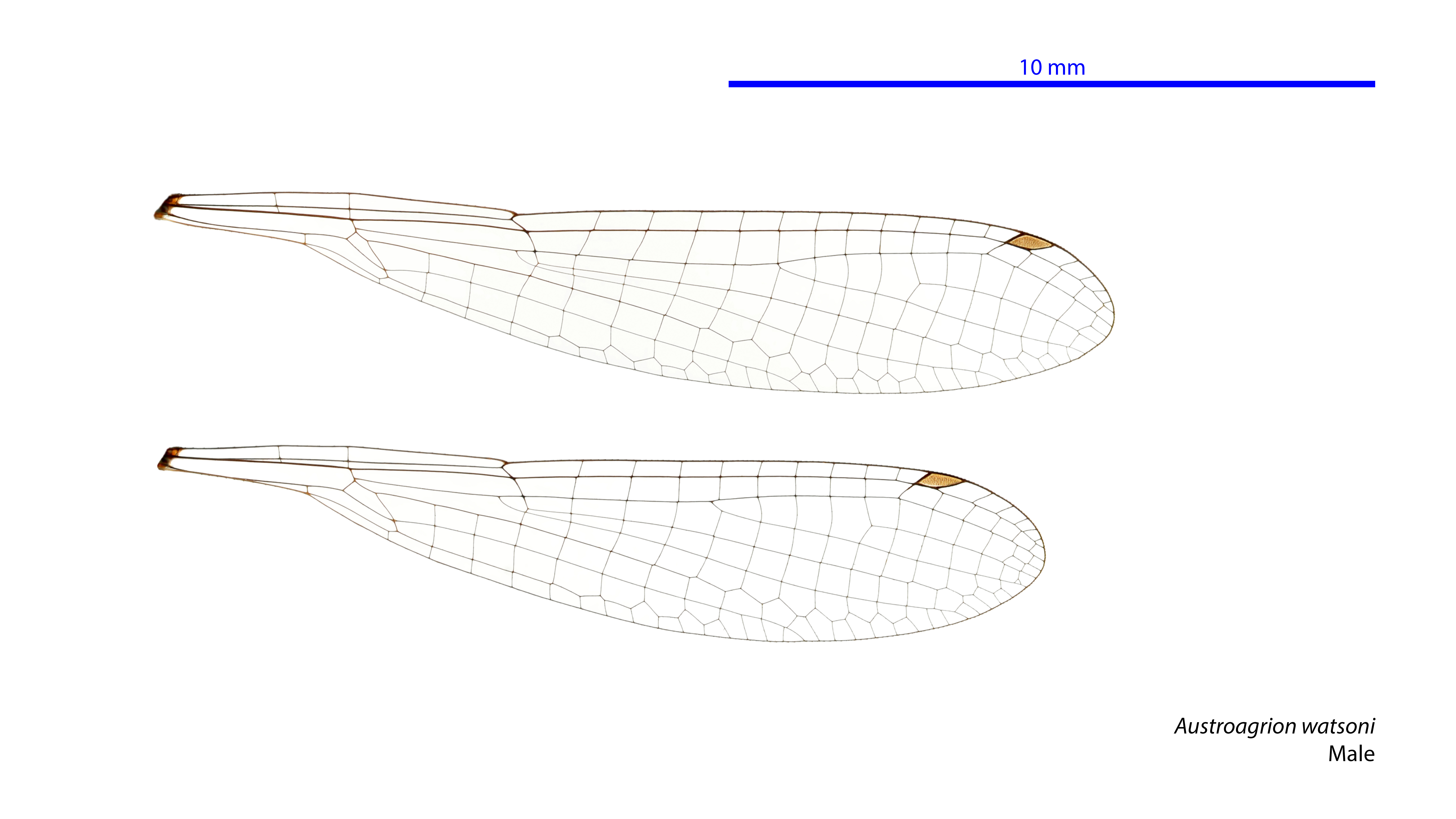
Male wings
