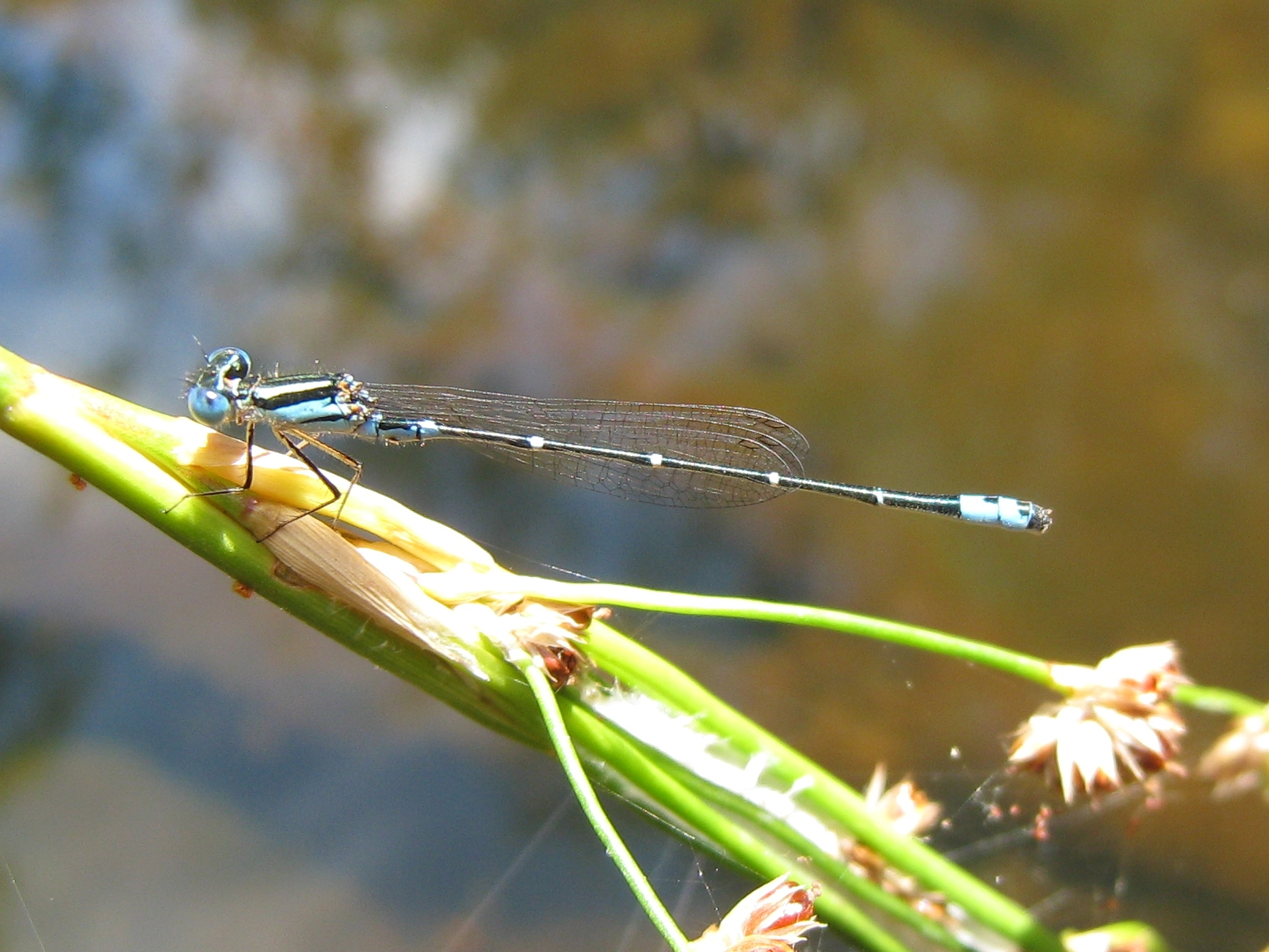
- Austroagrion watsoni Sydney, Australia

Scientific classification
- Kingdom: Animalia
- Phylum: Arthropoda
- Clade: Pancrustacea
- Class: Insecta
- Order: Odonata
- Suborder: Zygoptera
- Family: Coenagrionidae
- Genus: Austroagrion; Tillyard, 1913

= Austroagrion =

Genus of damselflies

Austroagrion is a genus of damselflies belonging to the family Coenagrionidae. Species of Austroagrion are small damselflies; males are black with blue or green markings while females are paler. Austroagrion occurs in Papua New Guinea, New Caledonia and Australia.

== Species ==
The genus Austroagrion includes the following species:

- Austroagrion cyane (Selys, 1876)
- Austroagrion exclamationis Campion, 1915
- Austroagrion kiautai Theischinger & Richards, 2007
- Austroagrion pindrina Watson, 1969
- Austroagrion watsoni Lieftinck, 1982

== Etymology ==
The genus name Austroagrion combines the prefix austro- (from Latin auster, meaning "south wind", hence "southern") with Agrion, a genus name derived from Greek ἄγριος (agrios, "wild"). Agrion was the name established by Fabricius in 1775 to include all Zygoptera. Austroagrion thus refers to a southern representative of that group.
