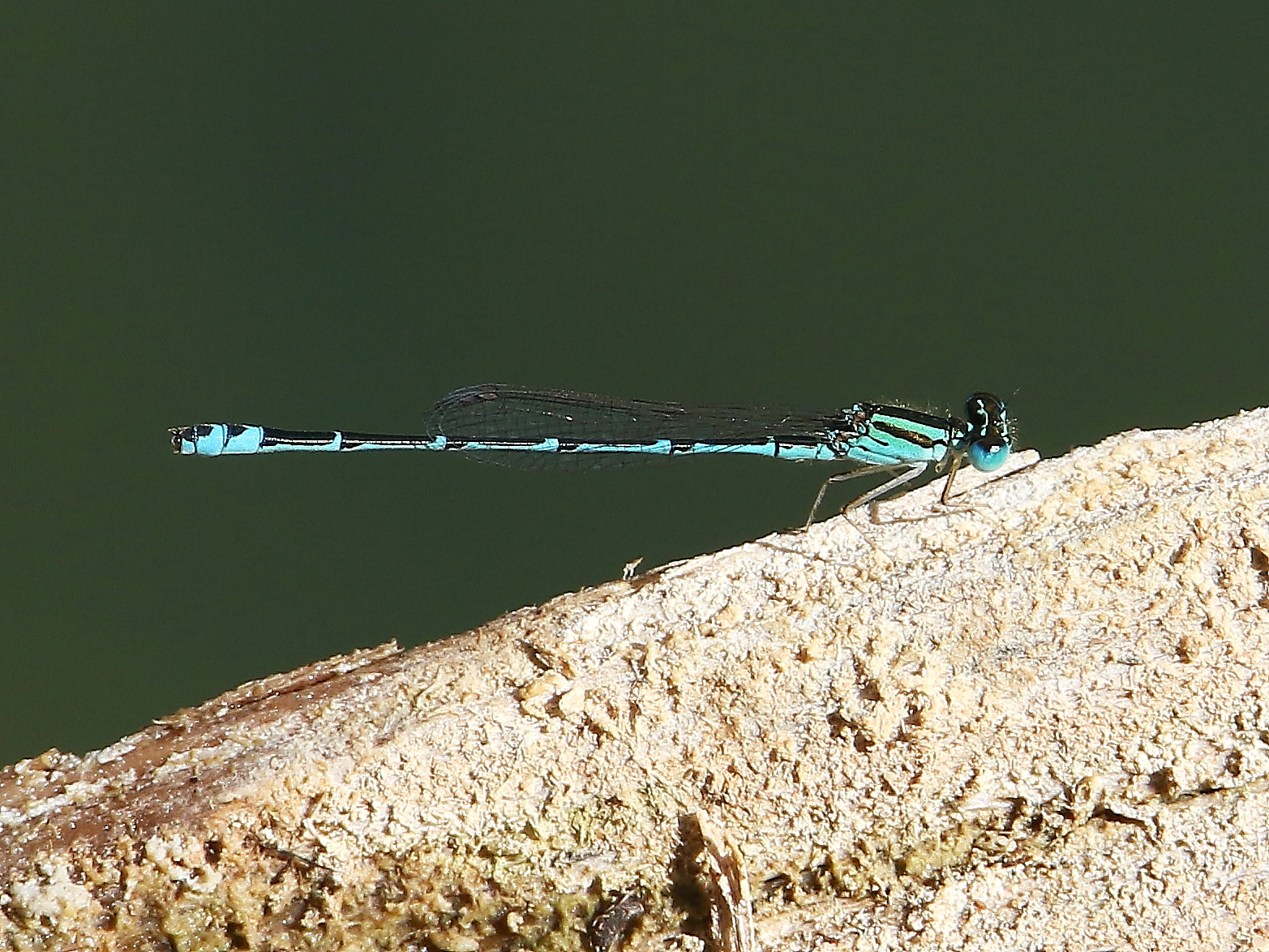
- Male, Queensland
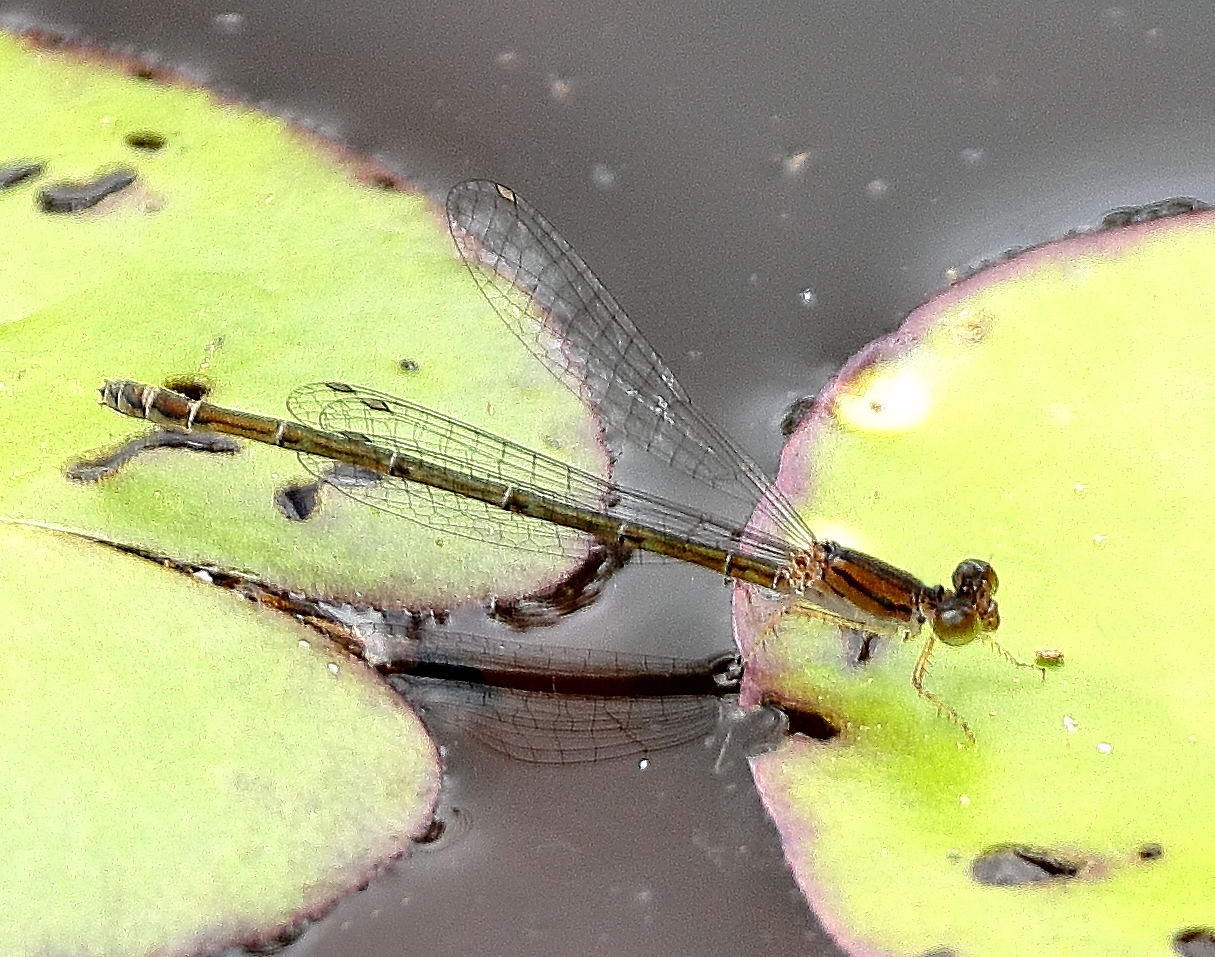
- Female, Queensland

Conservation status
- Least Concern (IUCN 3.1)

Scientific classification
- Kingdom: Animalia
- Phylum: Arthropoda
- Clade: Pancrustacea
- Class: Insecta
- Order: Odonata
- Suborder: Zygoptera
- Family: Coenagrionidae
- Genus: Austroagrion
- Species: A. exclamationis

Binomial name
- Austroagrion exclamationis Campion, 1915

= Austroagrion exclamationis =

Northern billabongfly

Species of damselfly

Austroagrion exclamationis is a species of damselfly in the family Coenagrionidae, commonly known as a northern billabongfly. It is a small damselfly; the male is blue and black. It has been recorded from New Guinea and northern Australia, where it inhabits streams and still water.

== Etymology ==
The genus name Austroagrion combines the prefix austro- (from Latin auster, meaning "south wind", hence "southern") with Agrion, a genus name derived from Greek ἄγριος (agrios, "wild"). Austroagrion thus refers to a southern representative of that group.

The species name exclamationis is derived from the Latin exclamatio ("exclamation"), referring to the marking on segment 3 of its abdomen.

== Gallery ==
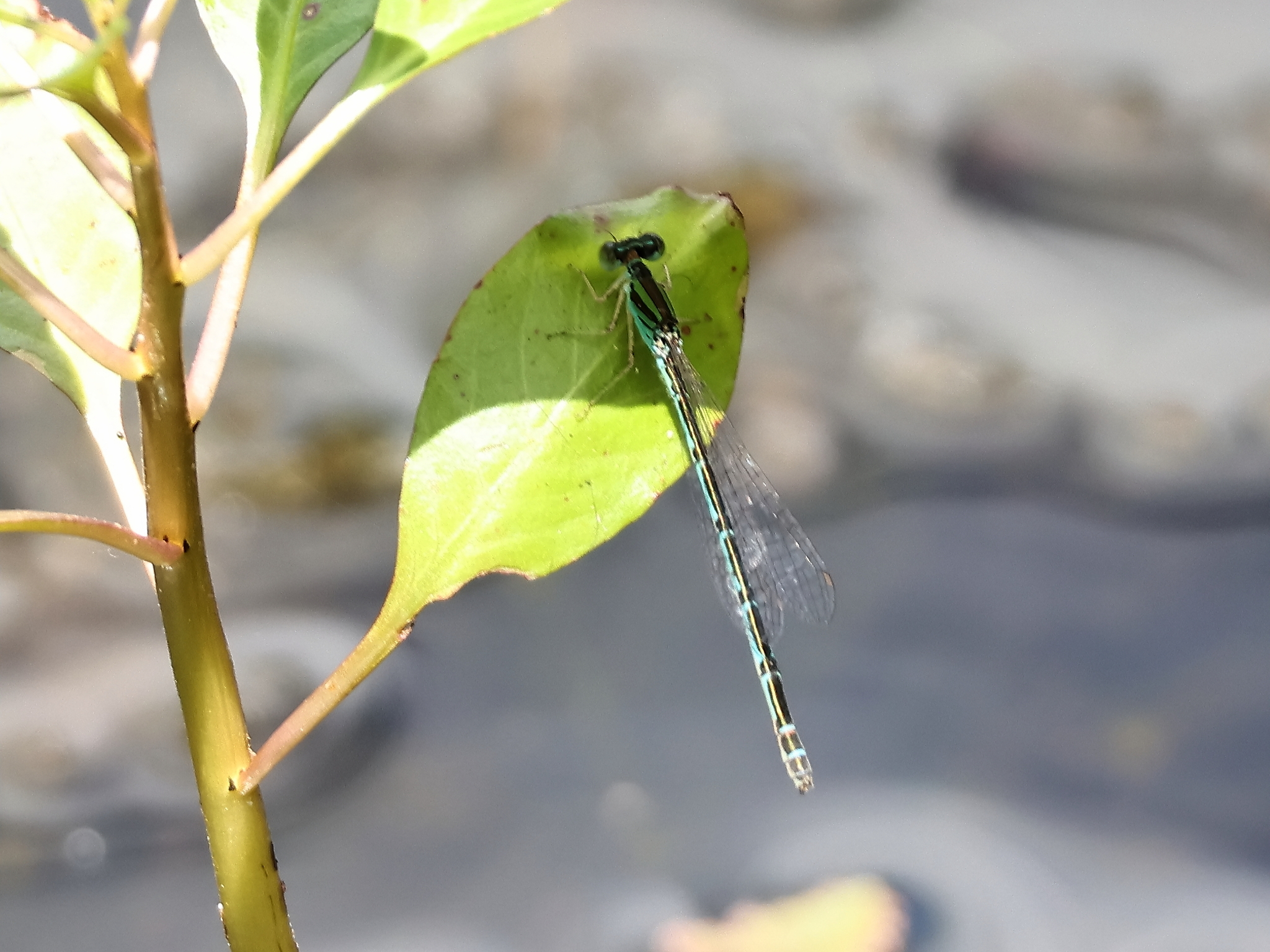
Female

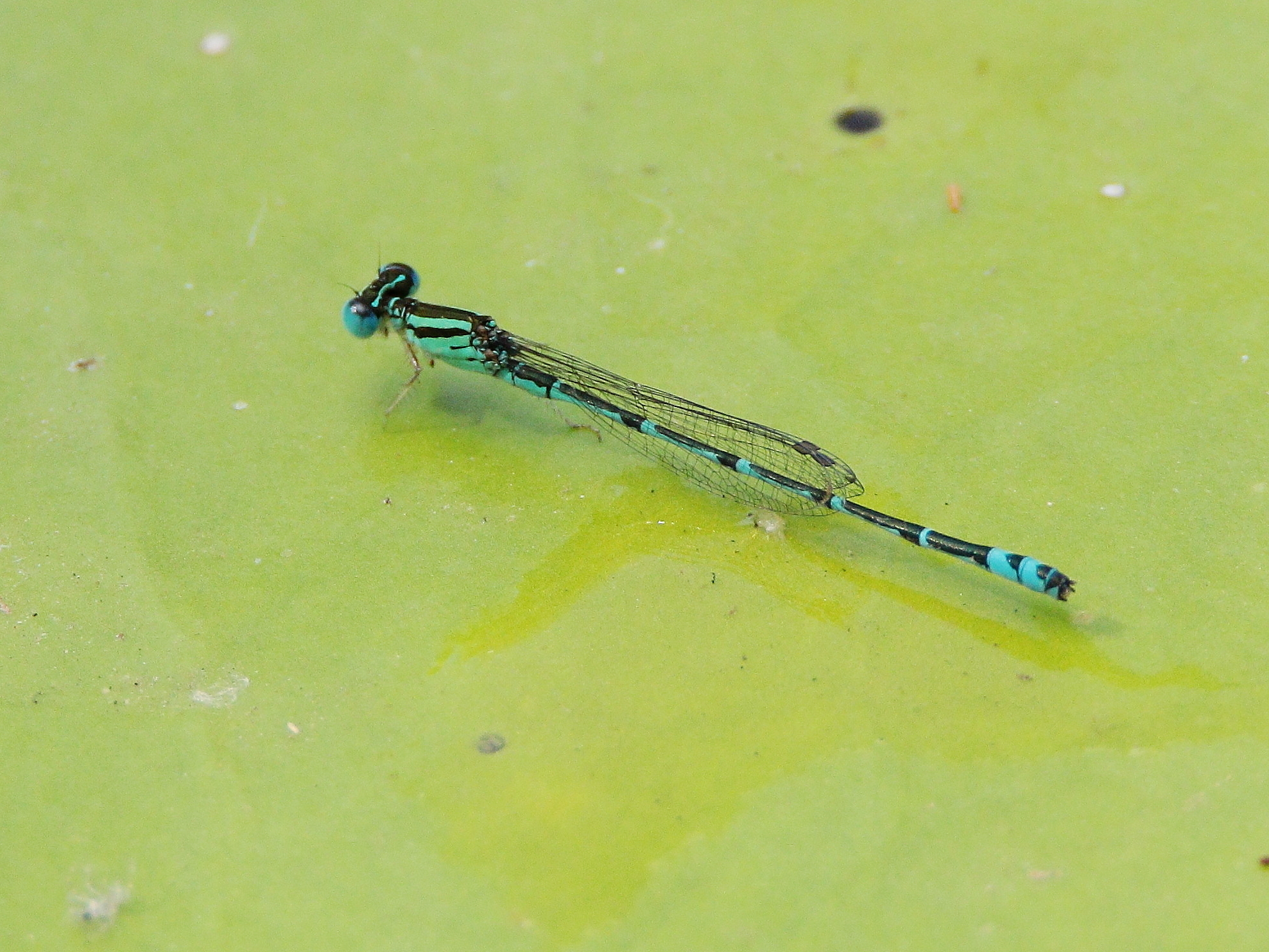
Male

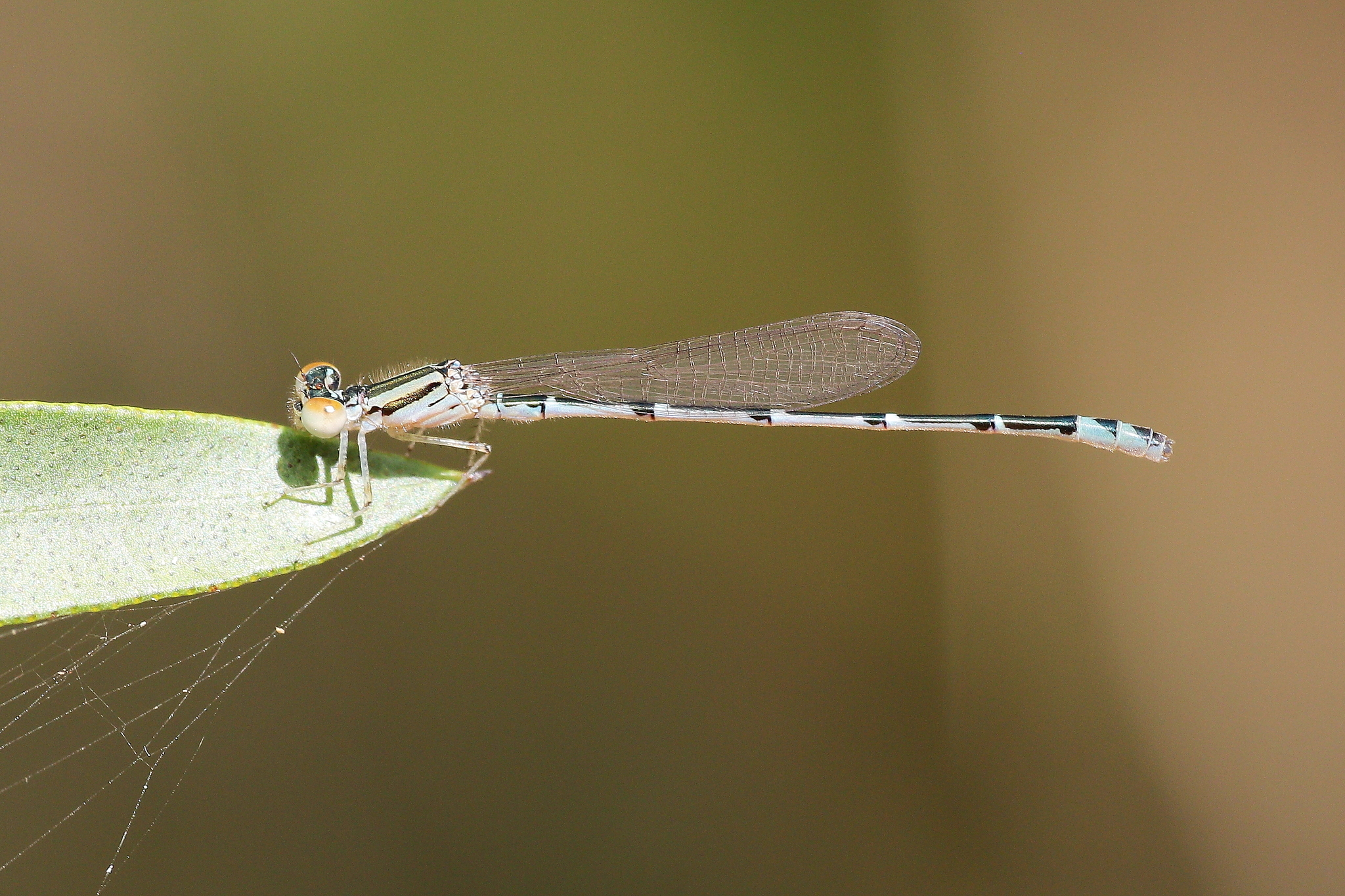
Young male

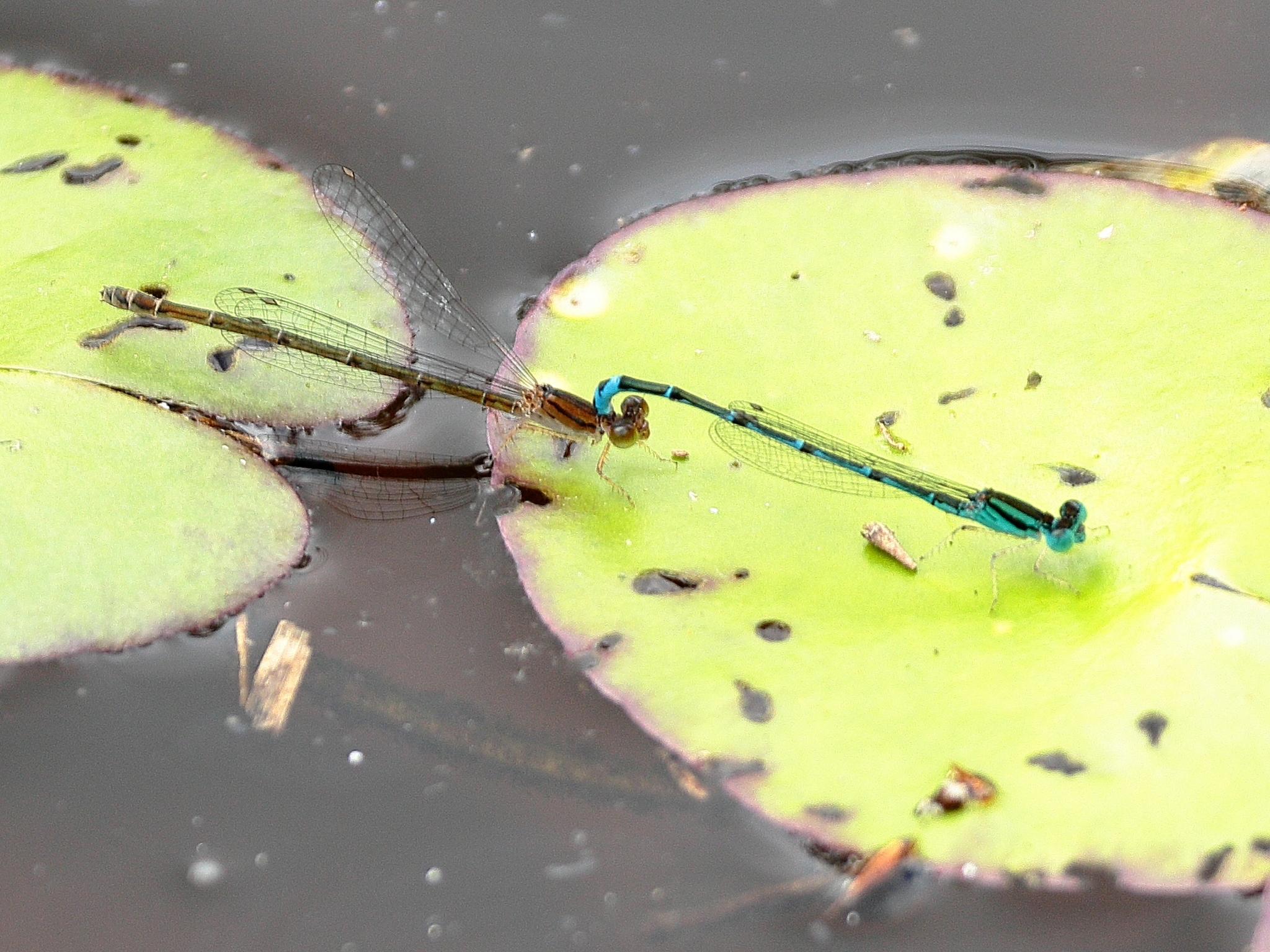
in copula

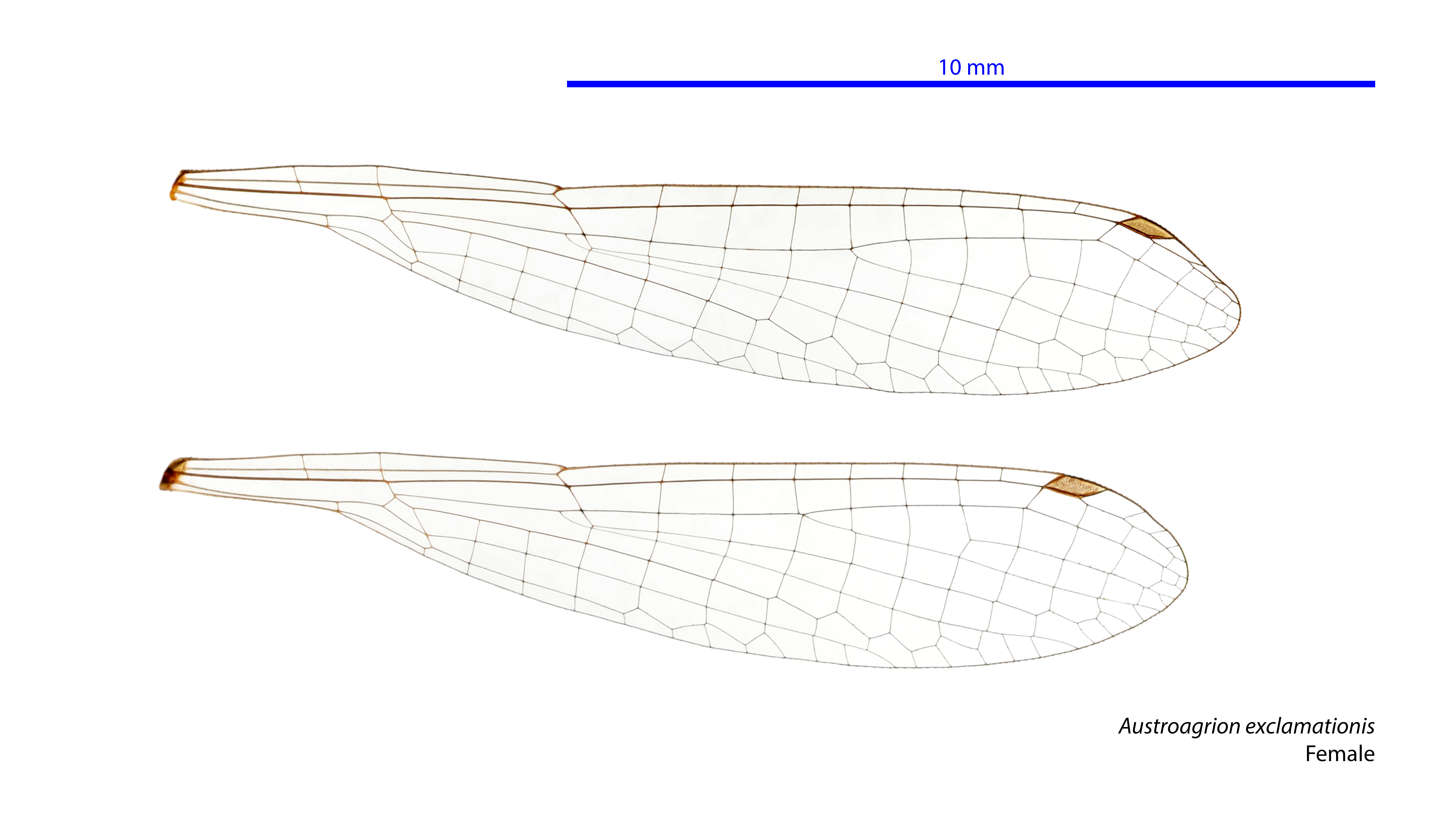
Female wings

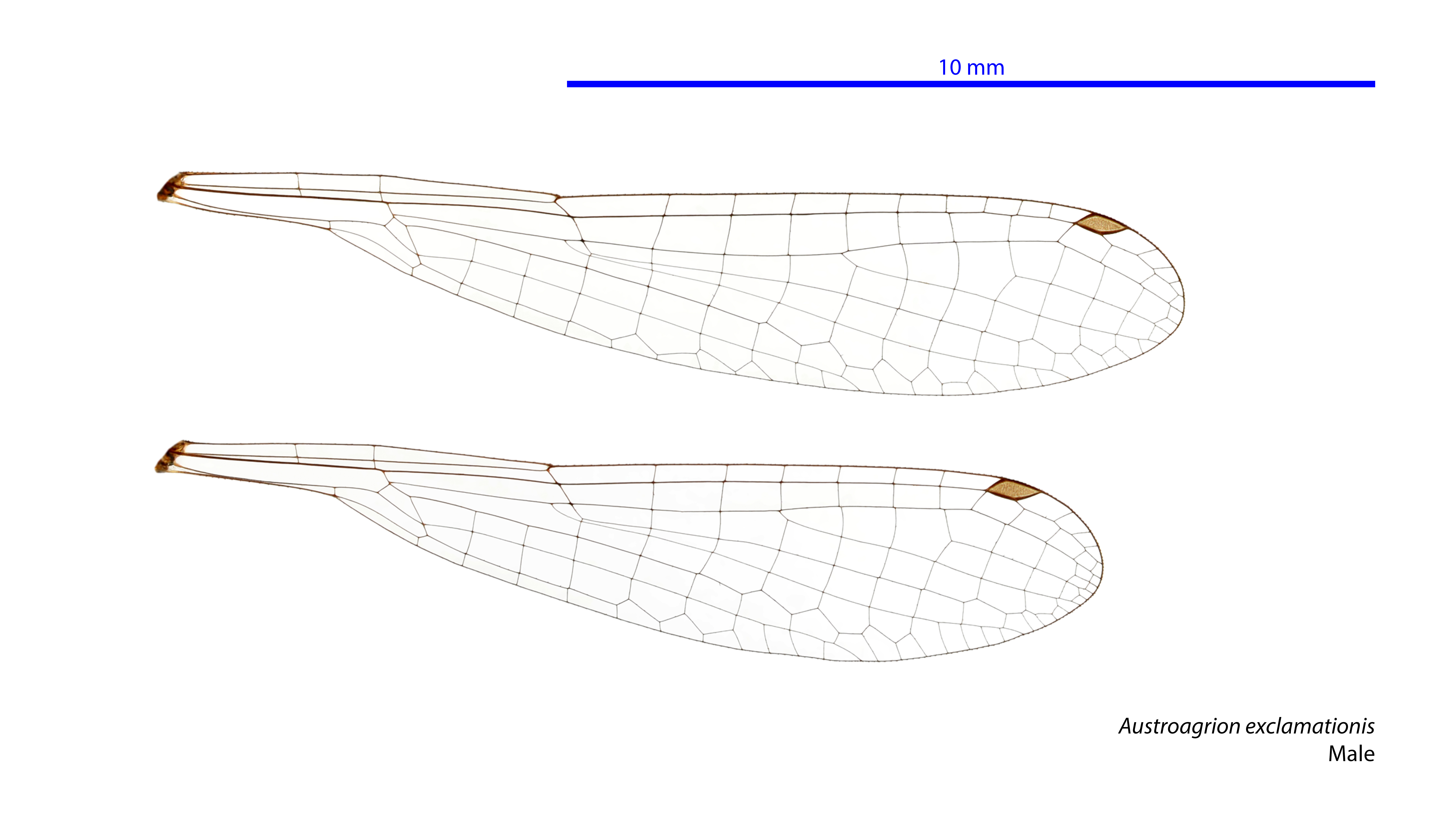
Male wings

== See also ==
- List of Odonata species of Australia
