= Austroagrion cyane =

South-western billabongfly

Conservation status
- Least Concern (IUCN 3.1)

Scientific classification
- Kingdom: Animalia
- Phylum: Arthropoda
- Clade: Pancrustacea
- Class: Insecta
- Order: Odonata
- Suborder: Zygoptera
- Family: Coenagrionidae
- Genus: Austroagrion
- Species: A. cyane

Binomial name
- Austroagrion cyane (Selys, 1876)

Synonyms
- Pseudagrion cyane Selys, 1876; Pseudagrion coeruleum Tillyard, 1908

Species of damselfly

Austroagrion cyane, the south-western billabongfly, is a species of damselfly of the family Coenagrionidae. Despite their common name, they have been found not only in south-western Australia, but also in diverse locations across Australia.

== Habit & Habitat ==
Austroagrion cyane are permanent residents of aquatic habitats. They prefer slow-moving water. Adults grow to around 20-30 mm in length. Females are less common than males and are mostly attracted to ephemeral swamps.

== Etymology ==
The genus name Austroagrion combines the prefix austro- (from Latin auster, meaning "south wind", hence "southern") with Agrion, a genus name derived from Greek ἄγριος (agrios, "wild"). Austroagrion thus refers to a southern representative of that group.

The species name cyane is derived from Greek κυανῆ (kyanē, "dark blue"), referring to its distinctive blue colouring.

== Gallery ==
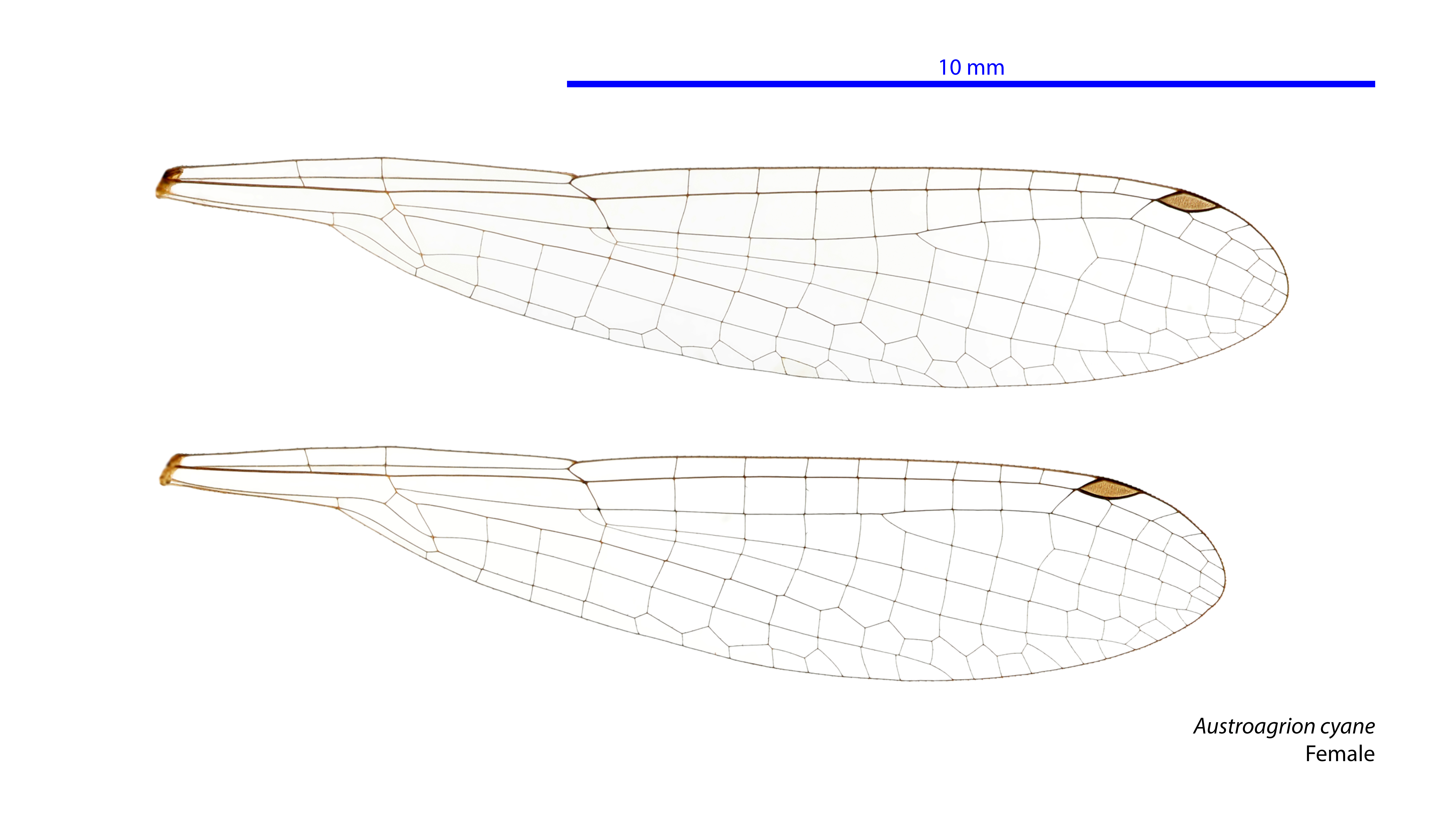
Female wings

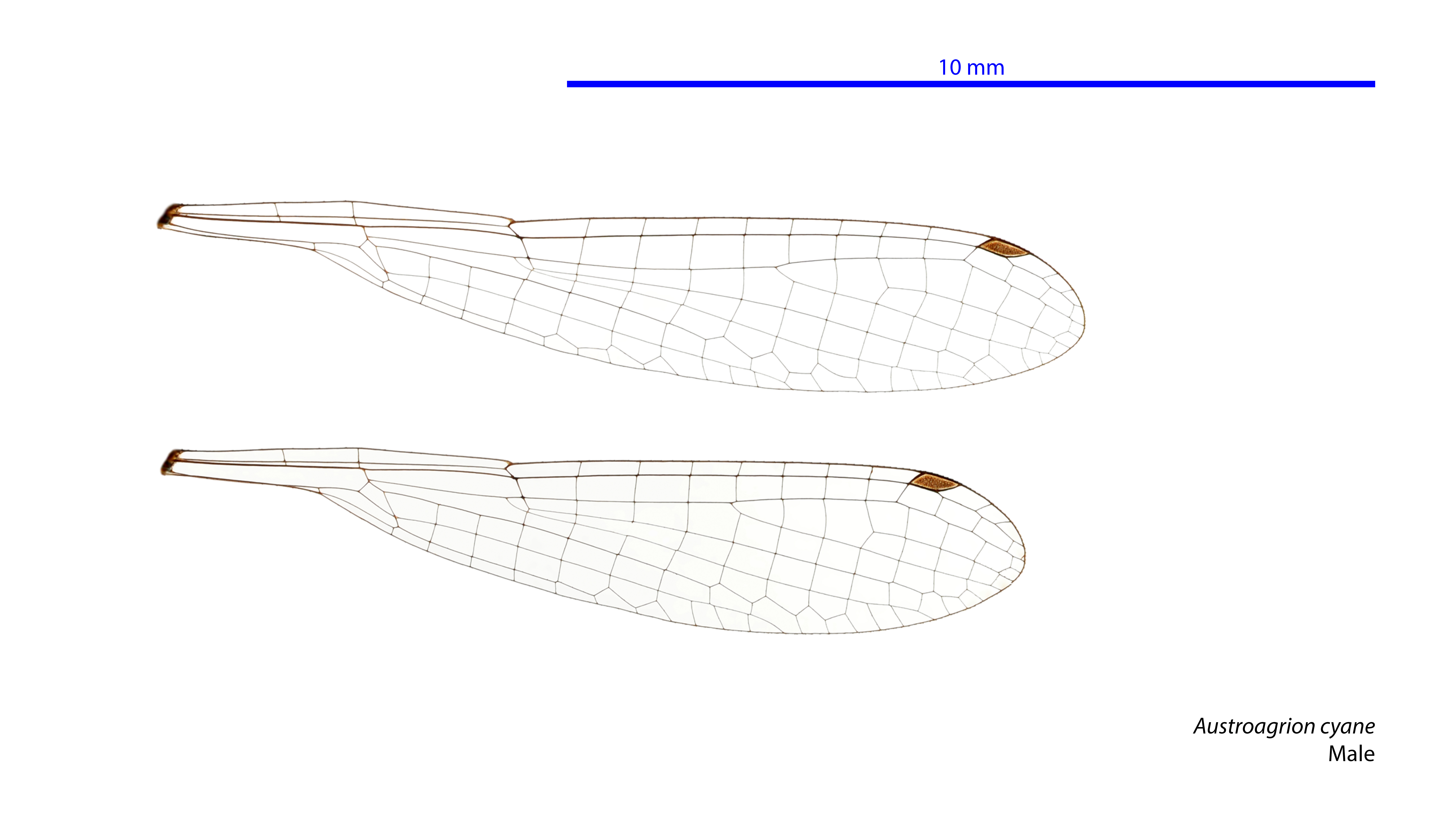
Male wings
