= Austroagrion kiautai =

Conservation status
- Data Deficient (IUCN 3.1)

Scientific classification
- Kingdom: Animalia
- Phylum: Arthropoda
- Clade: Pancrustacea
- Class: Insecta
- Order: Odonata
- Suborder: Zygoptera
- Family: Coenagrionidae
- Genus: Austroagrion
- Species: A. kiautai

Binomial name
- Austroagrion kiautai Theischinger and Richards, 1982

Species of insects

Austroagrion kiautai is a damselfly in the family Coenagrionidae. It has been found at about 2,000 m (6,600 ft) above sea level, in a montane lake behind Maimafu, Eastern Highlands Province, Papua New Guinea.
