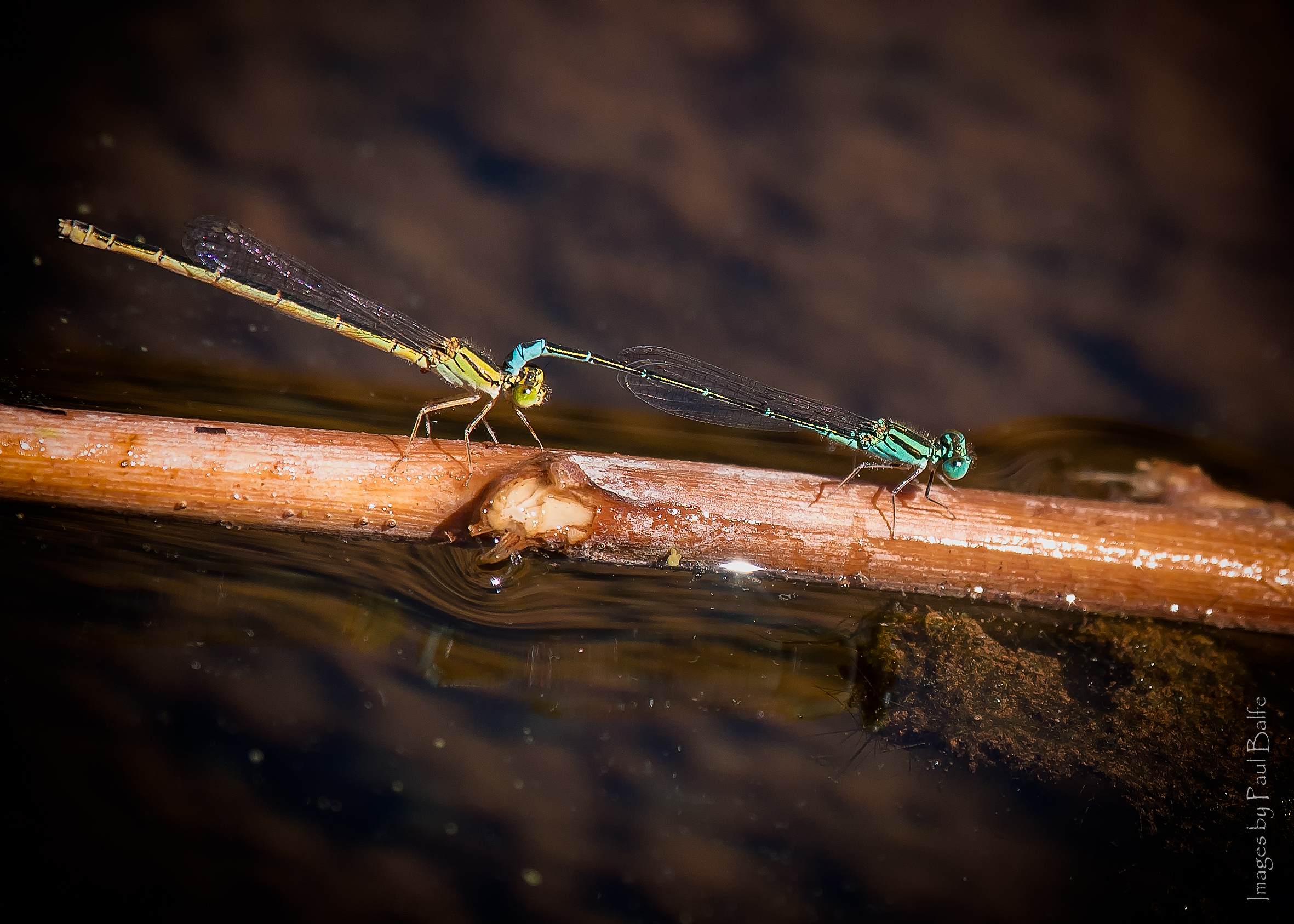
- Mating pair

Conservation status
- Vulnerable (IUCN 3.1)

Scientific classification
- Kingdom: Animalia
- Phylum: Arthropoda
- Clade: Pancrustacea
- Class: Insecta
- Order: Odonata
- Suborder: Zygoptera
- Family: Coenagrionidae
- Genus: Austroagrion
- Species: A. pindrina

Binomial name
- Austroagrion pindrina Watson, 1969

= Austroagrion pindrina =

Pilbara billabongfly

Species of damselfly

Austroagrion pindrina, commonly known as Pilbara billabongfly, is a species of damselfly in the family Coenagrionidae It is a small damselfly; the male is blue and black. It is endemic to the Pilbara region of Western Australia, where it inhabits streams and still waters.

== Etymology ==
The genus name Austroagrion combines the prefix austro- (from Latin auster, meaning "south wind", hence "southern") with Agrion, a genus name derived from Greek ἄγριος (agrios, "wild"). Austroagrion thus refers to a southern representative of that group.

The species name pindrina is derived from Pindrina Springs in Hamersley Range, Western Australia, where the species occurs.

== Gallery ==
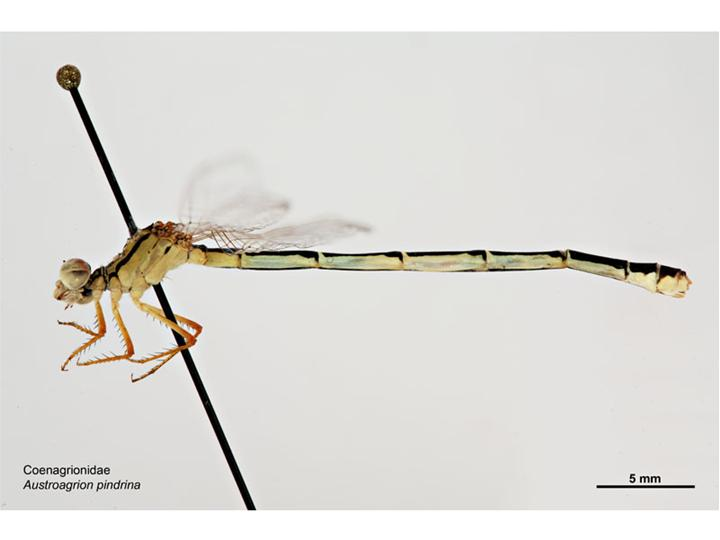
Female museum specimen

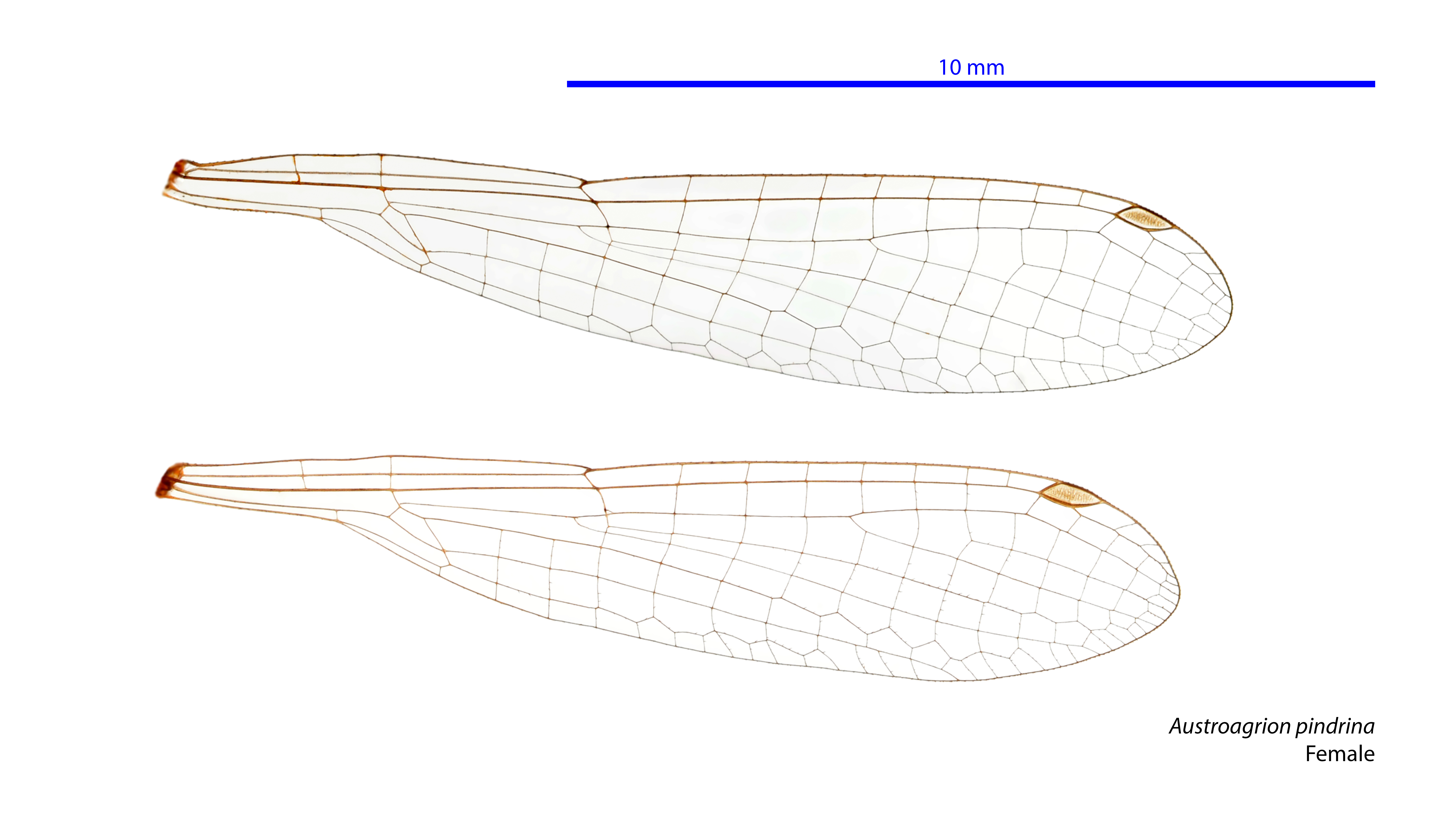
Female wings

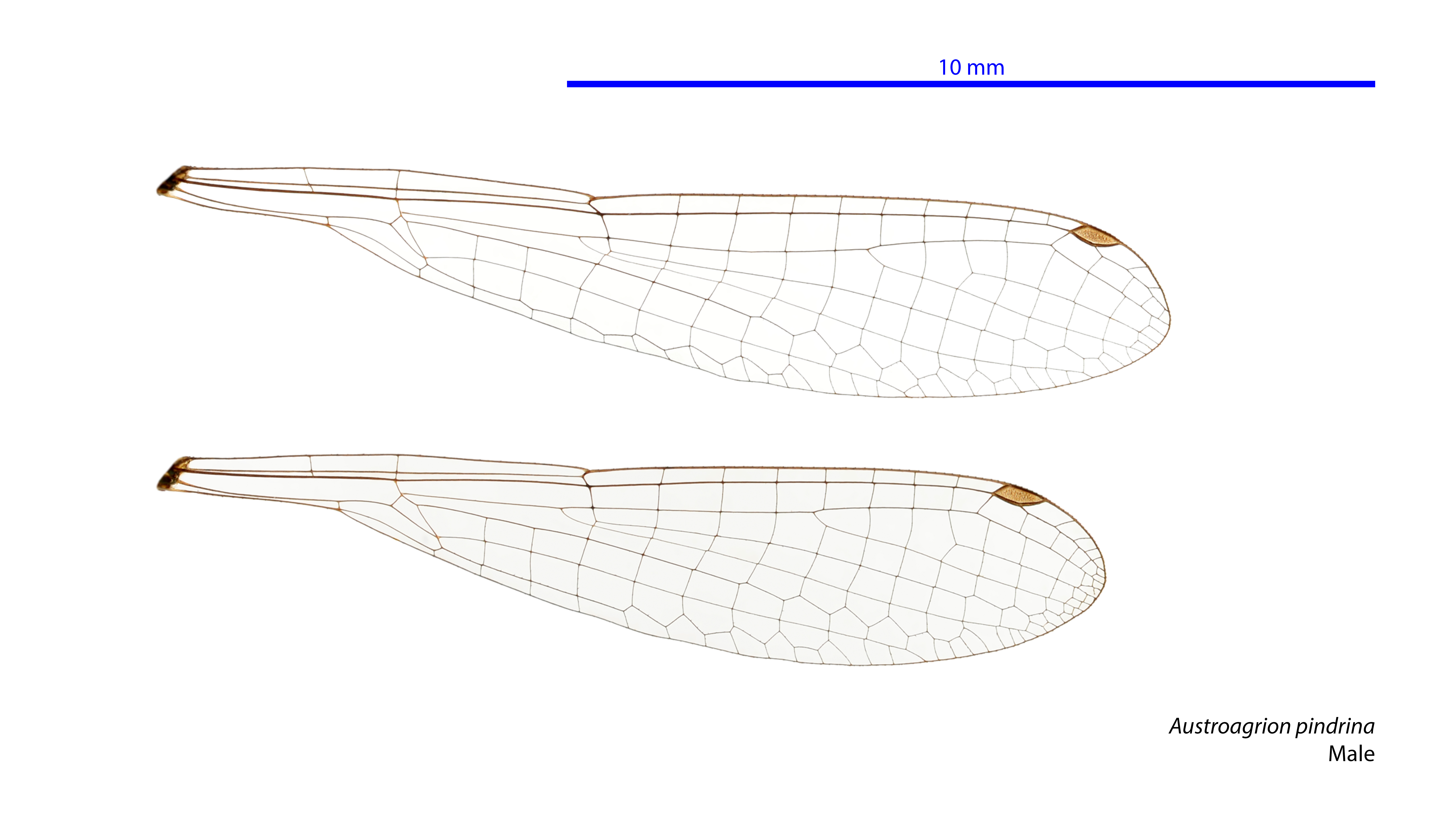
Male wings

== See also ==
- List of Odonata species of Australia
