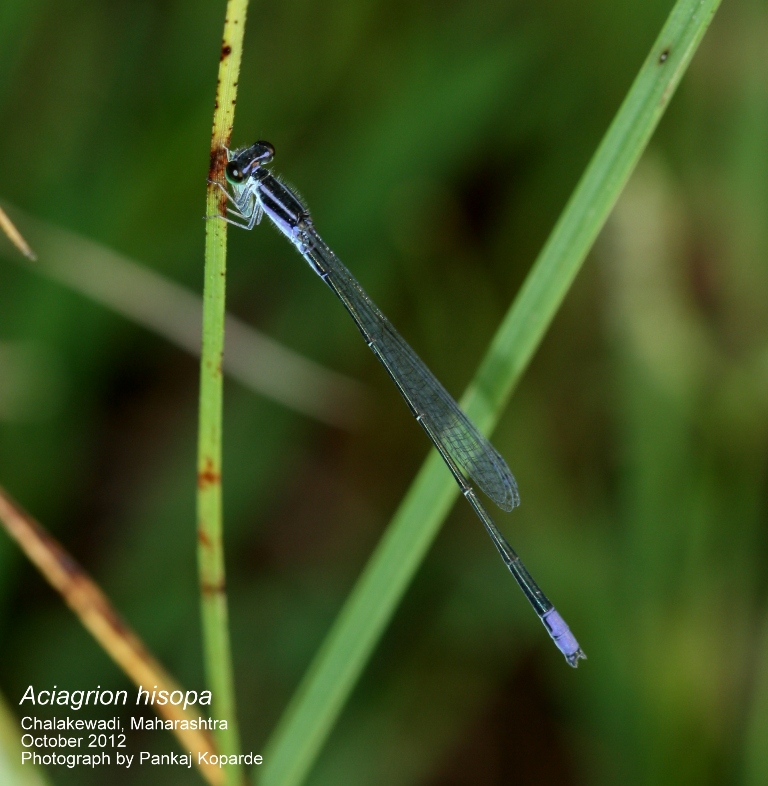

Conservation status
- Least Concern (IUCN 3.1)

Scientific classification
- Kingdom: Animalia
- Phylum: Arthropoda
- Class: Insecta
- Order: Odonata
- Suborder: Zygoptera
- Family: Coenagrionidae
- Genus: Aciagrion
- Species: A. hisopa

Binomial name
- Aciagrion hisopa (Sélys, 1876)

Synonyms
- Pseudagrion hisopa Sélys, 1876; Aciagrion krishna Fraser, 1921; Aciagrion aciculare Lieftinck, 1929

= Aciagrion hisopa =

Species of damselfly

Aciagrion hisopa, is a species of damselfly in the family Coenagrionidae. It is abundant in many South Asian countries, but populations in Sri Lanka is still in doubt.

Fraser considered the specimen found in Western Ghats as Aciargion hisopa race krishna. A recent study revealed that the subspecies krishna found in Western Ghats is not conspecific with A. hisopa and found to be very close to A. approximans found in Northeast India; but differing at the level of subspecies.

== Sources ==
- http://animaldiversity.org/accounts/Aciagrion_hisopa/classification/
- http://thaiodonata.blogspot.com/2011/07/138-aciagrion-hisopa-selys-1876.html
- Article title
- http://srilankanodonata.blogspot.com/
- Dow, R.A. (2009). "Aciagrion hisopa". IUCN Red List of Threatened Species. 2009 e.T163798A5653206. doi:10.2305/IUCN.UK.2009-2.RLTS.T163798A5653206.en.
- http://indiabiodiversity.org/species/show/226423
