= Aciagrion africanum =

Conservation status
- Least Concern (IUCN 3.1)

Scientific classification
- Kingdom: Animalia
- Phylum: Arthropoda
- Class: Insecta
- Order: Odonata
- Suborder: Zygoptera
- Family: Coenagrionidae
- Genus: Aciagrion
- Species: A. africanum

Binomial name
- Aciagrion africanum Martin, 1908

Synonyms
- Mombagrion congoense Sjöstedt, 1917; Aciagrion congoense (Sjöstedt, 1917); Pseudagrion pseudoerythromma Schmidt, 1936

Species of damselfly

Aciagrion africanum is a species of damselfly in the family Coenagrionidae. It is found in Cameroon, the Republic of the Congo, Ivory Coast, Guinea, Guinea-Bissau, Liberia, Malawi, Mozambique, Nigeria, Uganda, Zambia, Zimbabwe, and possibly Tanzania. Its natural habitats are subtropical or tropical dry forests, subtropical or tropical moist lowland forests, moist savanna, subtropical or tropical dry shrubland, subtropical or tropical moist shrubland, rivers, shrub-dominated wetlands, freshwater marshes, and intermittent freshwater marshes.
