= Aciagrion heterostictum =

Conservation status
- Least Concern (IUCN 3.1)

Scientific classification
- Kingdom: Animalia
- Phylum: Arthropoda
- Class: Insecta
- Order: Odonata
- Suborder: Zygoptera
- Family: Coenagrionidae
- Genus: Aciagrion
- Species: A. heterostictum

Binomial name
- Aciagrion heterostictum Fraser, 1955

Synonyms
- Aciagrion heterosticta Fraser, 1955; Aciagrion heterostictum karamoja Pinhey, 1962

Species of damselfly

Aciagrion heterostictum is a species of damselfly in the family Coenagrionidae. It is found in the Democratic Republic of the Congo, Namibia, Uganda, and Zambia. Its natural habitats are moist savanna, freshwater lakes, intermittent freshwater lakes, freshwater marshes, and intermittent freshwater marshes.
