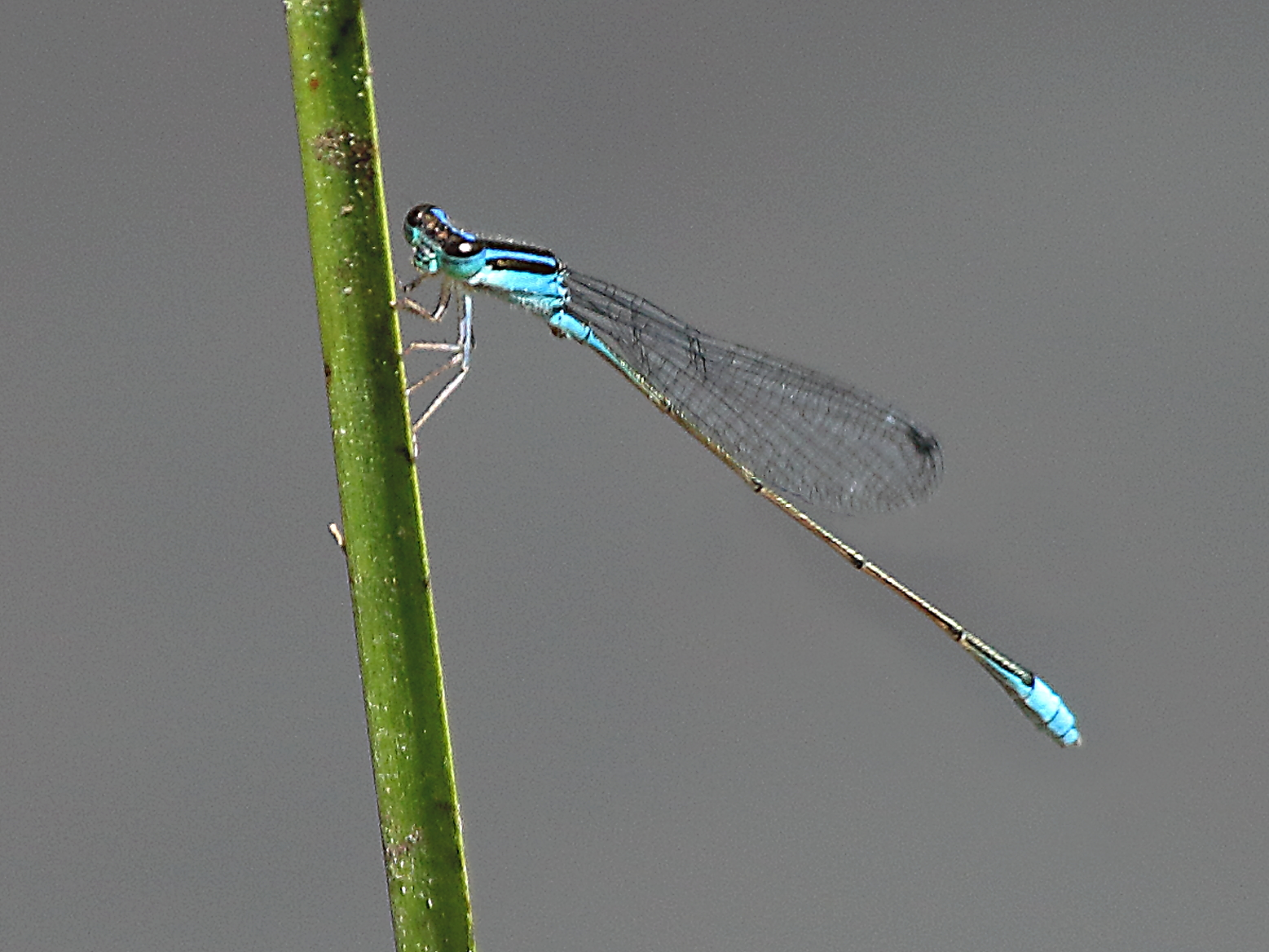
- Male, north Queensland

Conservation status
- Least Concern (IUCN 3.1)

Scientific classification
- Kingdom: Animalia
- Phylum: Arthropoda
- Clade: Pancrustacea
- Class: Insecta
- Order: Odonata
- Suborder: Zygoptera
- Family: Coenagrionidae
- Genus: Aciagrion
- Species: A. fragile

Binomial name
- Aciagrion fragile (Tillyard, 1906)

Synonyms
- Ischnura fragilis Tillyard, 1906

= Aciagrion fragile =

Blue slim

Species of damselfly

Aciagrion fragile is a species of damselfly in the family Coenagrionidae, commonly known as a blue slim. It is a small, slender damselfly, the male is blue and black. It has been recorded from northern Australia, New Guinea and the Lesser Sunda Islands in Indonesia, where it inhabits still waters and swamps.

== Etymology ==
The genus name Aciagrion is made from two greek words: aci or ἀκίς meaning a pointed object or needle, and agrion or ἄγριος, meaning wild. Agrion was the name given in 1775 by Johan Fabricius for all damselflies.

The species name fragile is a Latin word meaning fragile, or easily broken. In 1906, Robin Tillyard named this species probably in contrast to other members of the genus Ischnura, where it had been provisionally placed. While the name was originally spelled "fragilis", the ICZN mandates that species names that are adjectival must agree in gender with the genus name, so when this species was moved to the genus Aciagrion, which is neuter in grammatical gender, the spelling of the species name changed to fragile.

== Gallery ==
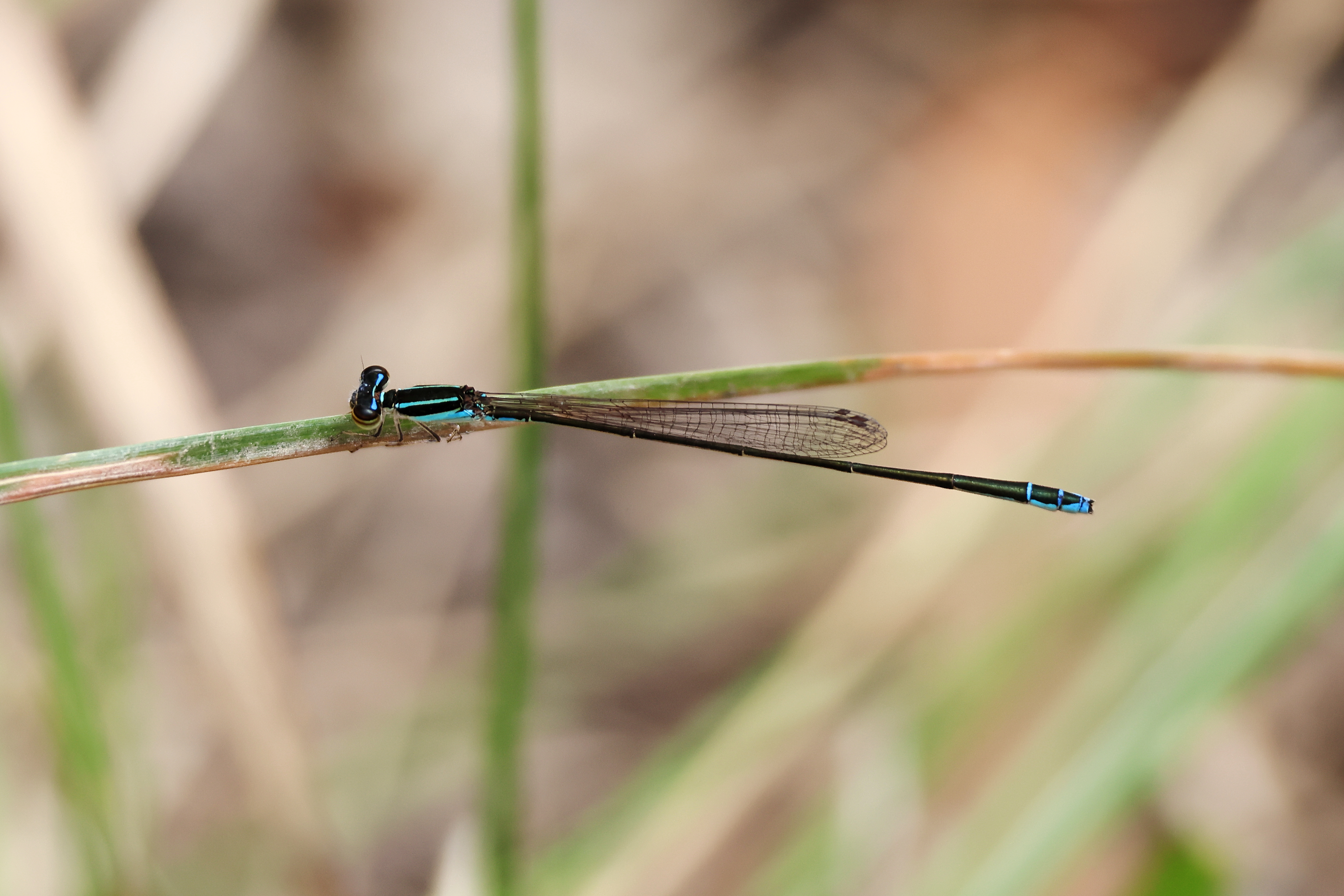
Male, Cairns Queensland

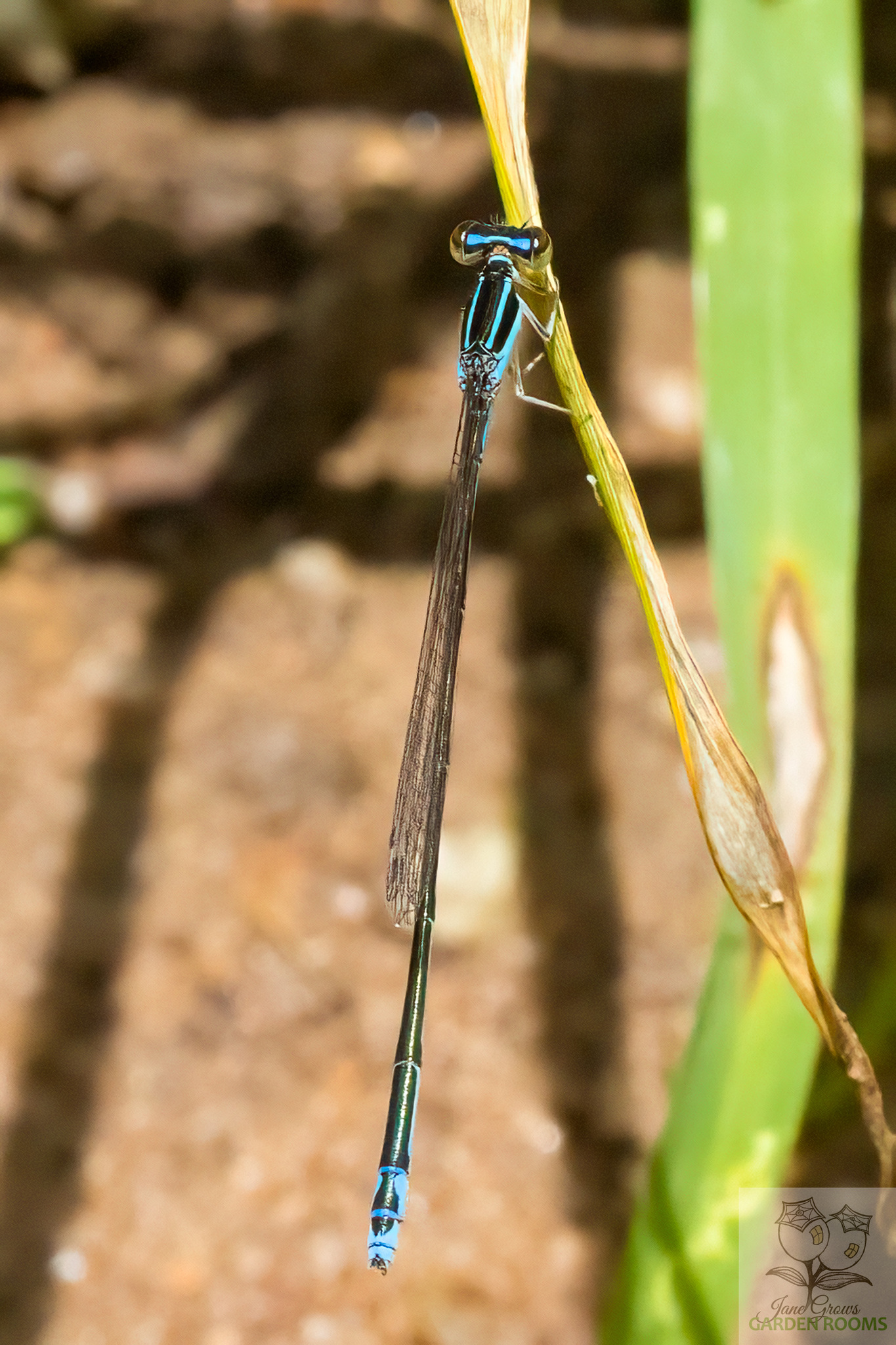
Male

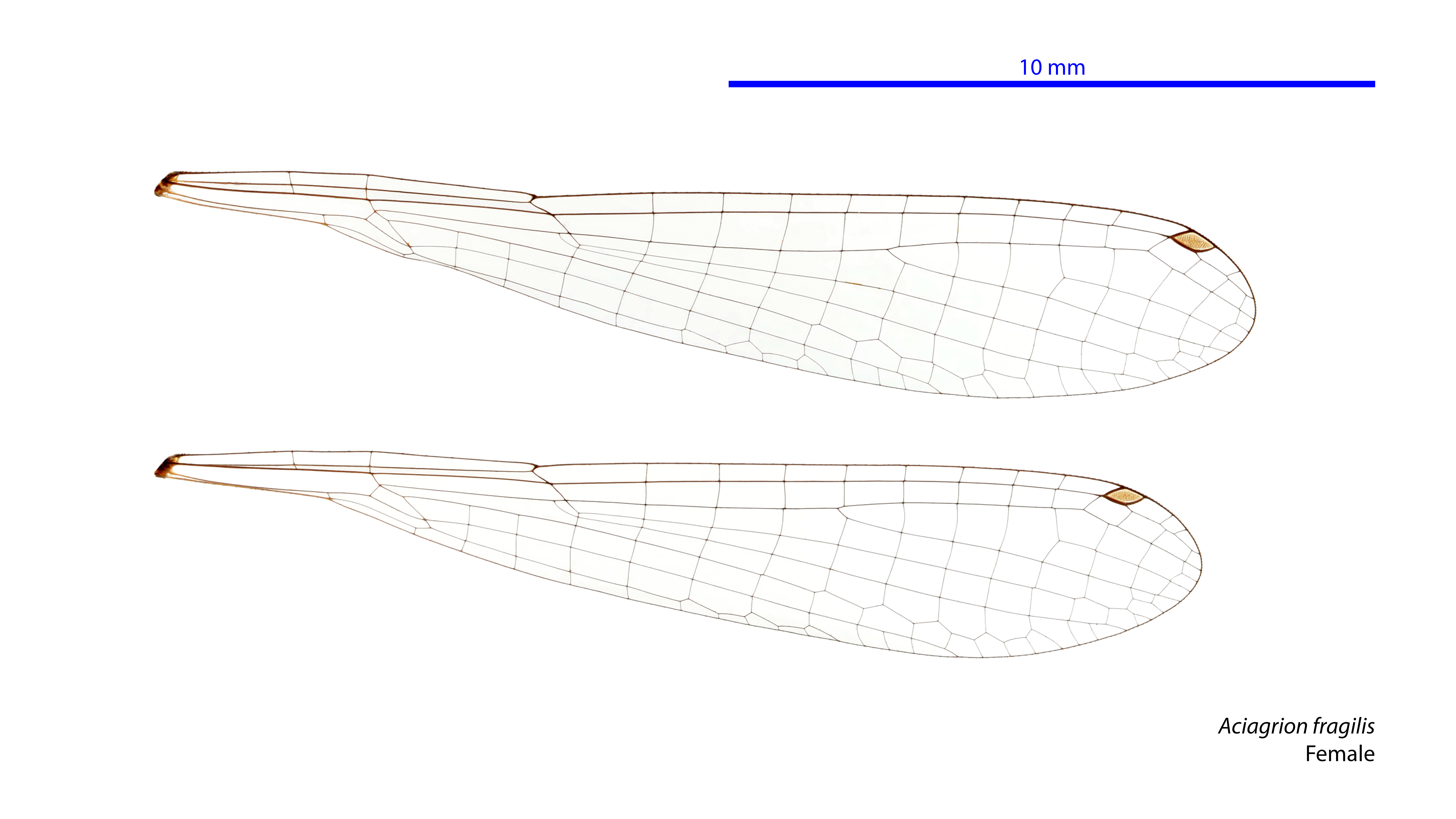
Female wings

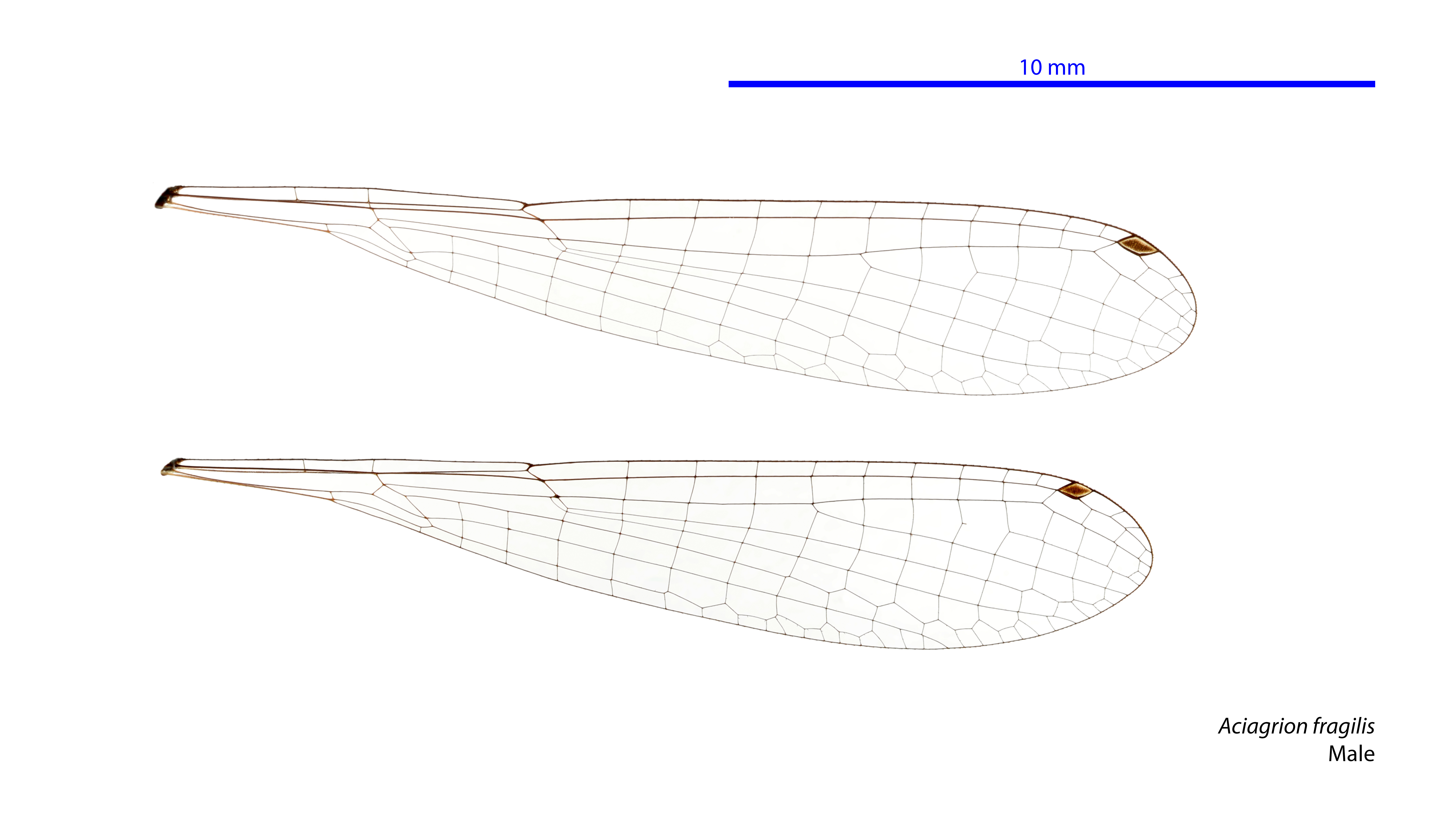
Male wings

== See also ==
- List of Odonata species of Australia
