= Aciagrion steeleae =

Conservation status
- Least Concern (IUCN 3.1)

Scientific classification
- Kingdom: Animalia
- Phylum: Arthropoda
- Class: Insecta
- Order: Odonata
- Suborder: Zygoptera
- Family: Coenagrionidae
- Genus: Aciagrion
- Species: A. steeleae

Binomial name
- Aciagrion steeleae Kimmins, 1955

Species of damselfly

Aciagrion steeleae is a species of damselfly in the family Coenagrionidae. It is found in Angola, Botswana, Malawi, Zambia, and possibly Tanzania. Its natural habitats are subtropical or tropical moist lowland forests, dry savanna, moist savanna, subtropical or tropical dry shrubland, rivers, intermittent rivers, swamps, freshwater marshes, and intermittent freshwater marshes.
