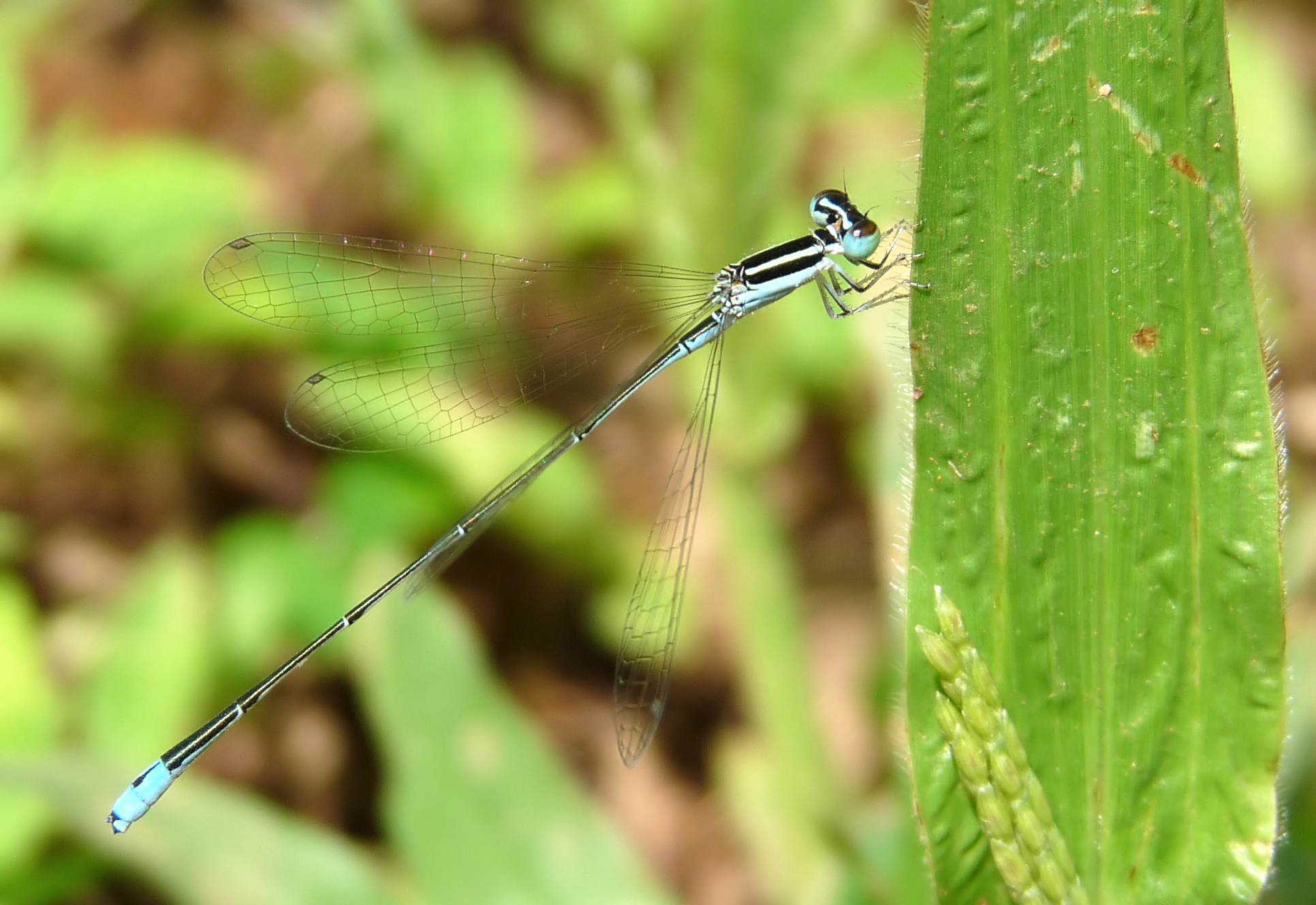
- male
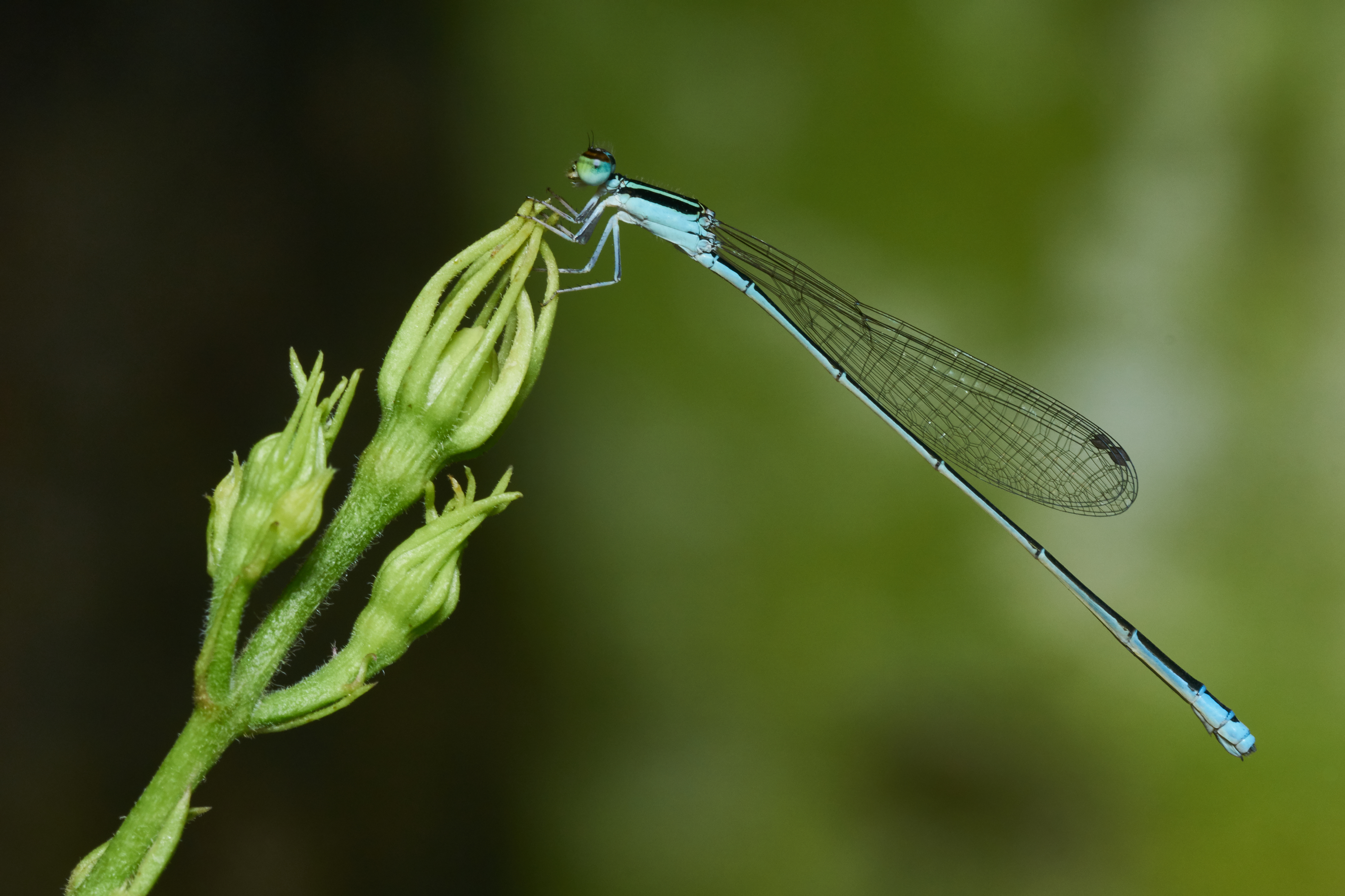
- female

Conservation status
- Least Concern (IUCN 3.1)

Scientific classification
- Kingdom: Animalia
- Phylum: Arthropoda
- Clade: Pancrustacea
- Class: Insecta
- Order: Odonata
- Suborder: Zygoptera
- Family: Coenagrionidae
- Genus: Aciagrion
- Species: A. occidentale

Binomial name
- Aciagrion occidentale Laidlaw, 1919

Synonyms
- Aciagron paludensis Fraser, 1922

= Aciagrion occidentale =

Species of damselfly

Aciagrion occidentale, green striped slender dartlet, is a species of damselfly in the family Coenagrionidae. It is found in India, Sri Lanka, Maldives, Vietnam and Thailand.

== Description and habitat ==
It is a long slender damselfly with a black spot in blue on the 8th segment of the abdomen. Its thorax is black with lateral azure blue stripes. Its abdomen is extremely slender with black on dorsum of segments 1 to 7 and light blue on the lateral sides. Segment 8 is blue with a narrow triangle black dorsal spot, segment 9 is blue. Segment 10 is black on dorsum and blue on the sides. Female is similar to the male except in the last three abdominal segments. Segment 8 has a broad black mark on dorsum, 9 with a small basal dorsal spot, and 10 is entirely blue.

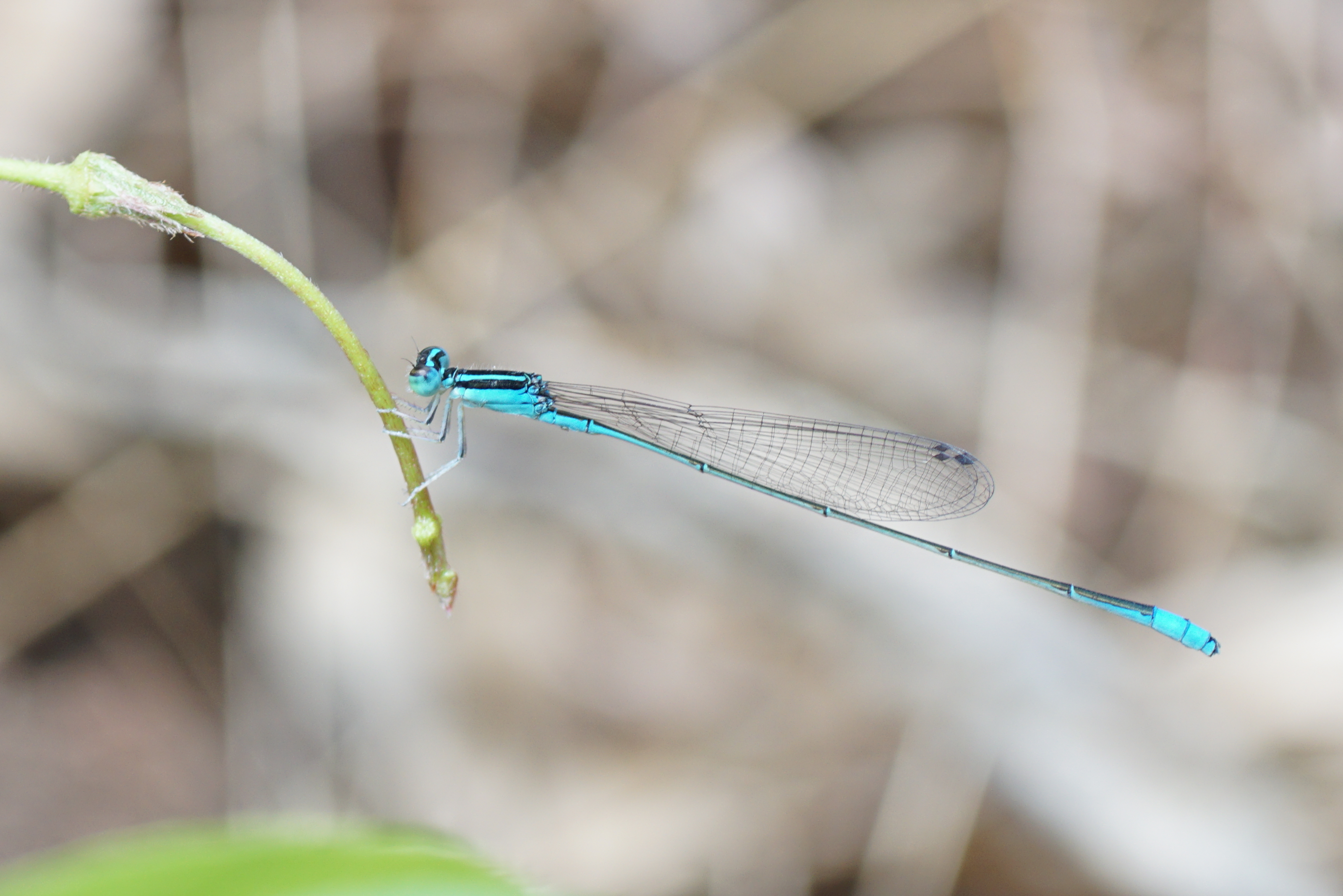
male

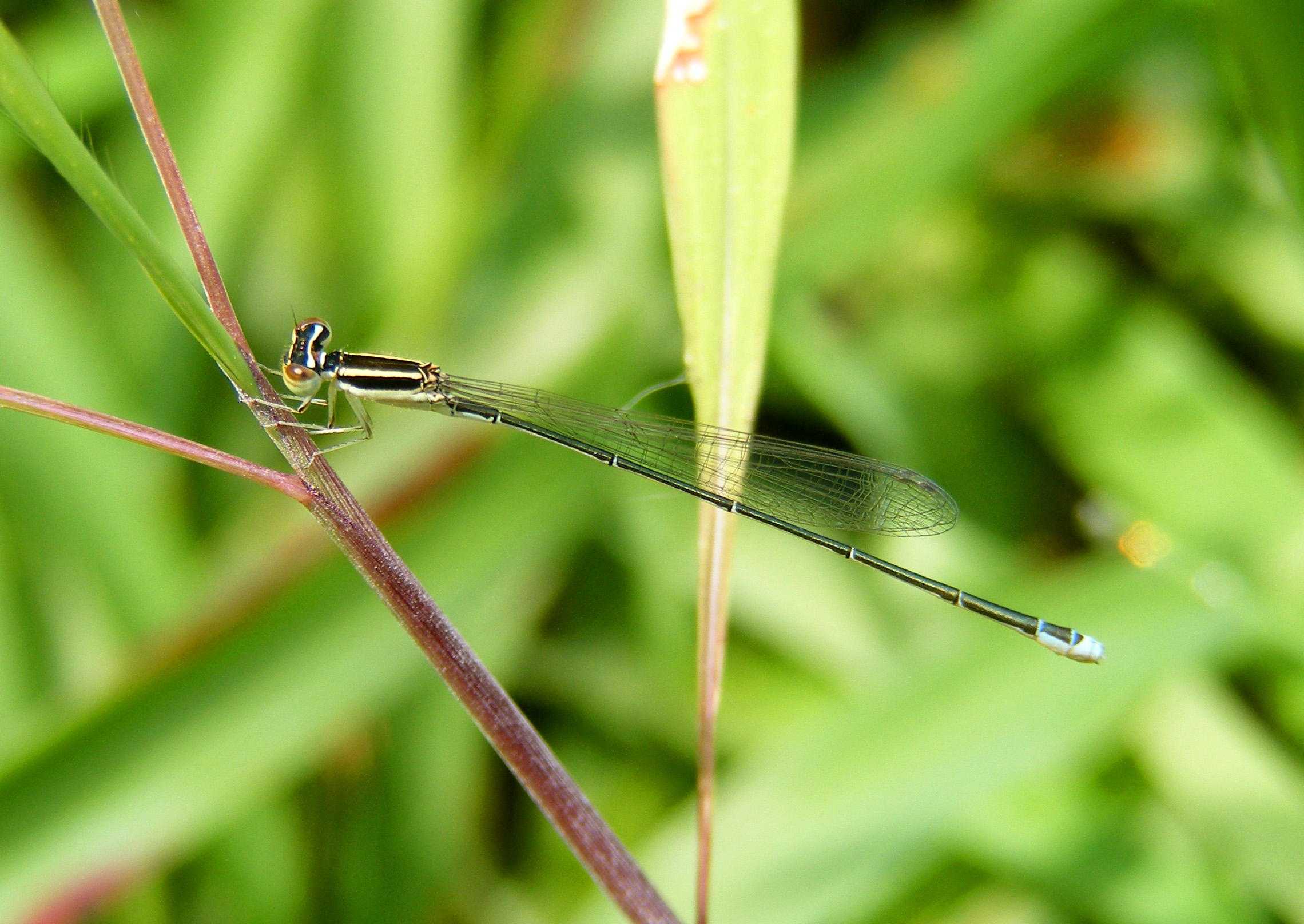
female (sub-adult)

It flies close to the ground and found in shrub dominated wetlands. In spite of its delicate build, it enjoys migration by rising high in the air and takes advantage of its lightweight in air currents.

== See also ==
- List of odonates of India
- List of odonata of Kerala
