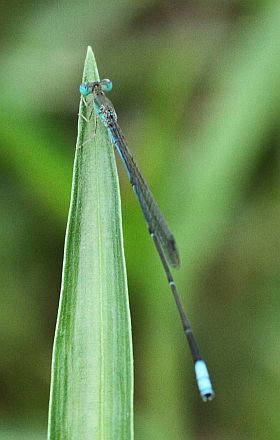
- Male

Conservation status
- Least Concern (IUCN 3.1)

Scientific classification
- Kingdom: Animalia
- Phylum: Arthropoda
- Class: Insecta
- Order: Odonata
- Suborder: Zygoptera
- Family: Coenagrionidae
- Genus: Aciagrion
- Species: A. gracile

Binomial name
- Aciagrion gracile (Sjöstedt, 1909)

Synonyms
- Mombagrion gracile Sjöstedt, 1909; Aciagrion attenuatum Fraser, 1928; Aciagrion hamoni Fraser, 1955; Aciagrion pinheyi Samways, 2001

= Aciagrion gracile =

Species of damselfly

Aciagrion gracile, commonly known as the graceful slim, is a species of damselfly in the family Coenagrionidae. It is found in Angola, Botswana, Ivory Coast, Gambia, Malawi, Mozambique, Nigeria, Tanzania, Uganda, Zambia, Zimbabwe, and possibly Kenya.

== Habitat ==
Its natural habitats are subtropical or tropical dry forests, dry savanna, moist savanna, rivers, intermittent rivers, shrub-dominated wetlands, swamps, freshwater marshes, and intermittent freshwater marshes.

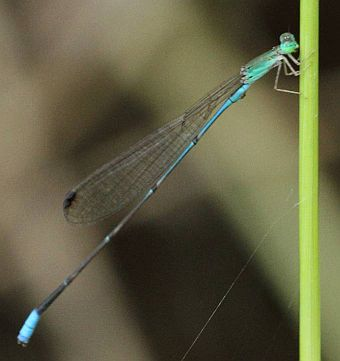
Male graceful slim. Berg-en-Dal, Kruger National Park
