= Aciagrion macrootithenae =

Conservation status
- Data Deficient (IUCN 3.1)

Scientific classification
- Kingdom: Animalia
- Phylum: Arthropoda
- Class: Insecta
- Order: Odonata
- Suborder: Zygoptera
- Family: Coenagrionidae
- Genus: Aciagrion
- Species: A. macrootithenae

Binomial name
- Aciagrion macrootithenae Pinhey, 1972

Species of damselfly

Aciagrion macrootithenae is a damselfly described by Elliot Pinhey in 1972.
