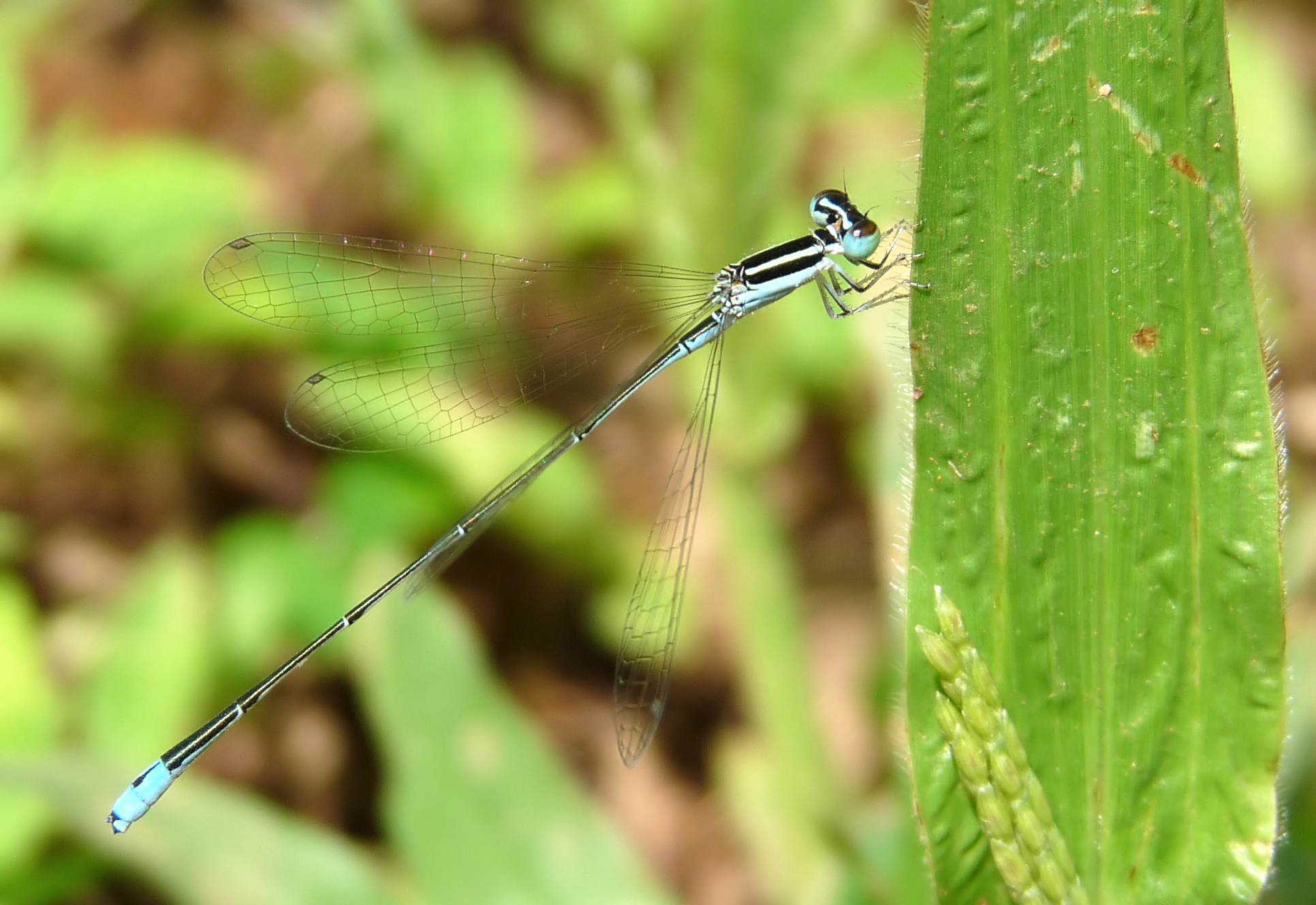
- Aciagrion occidentale, male
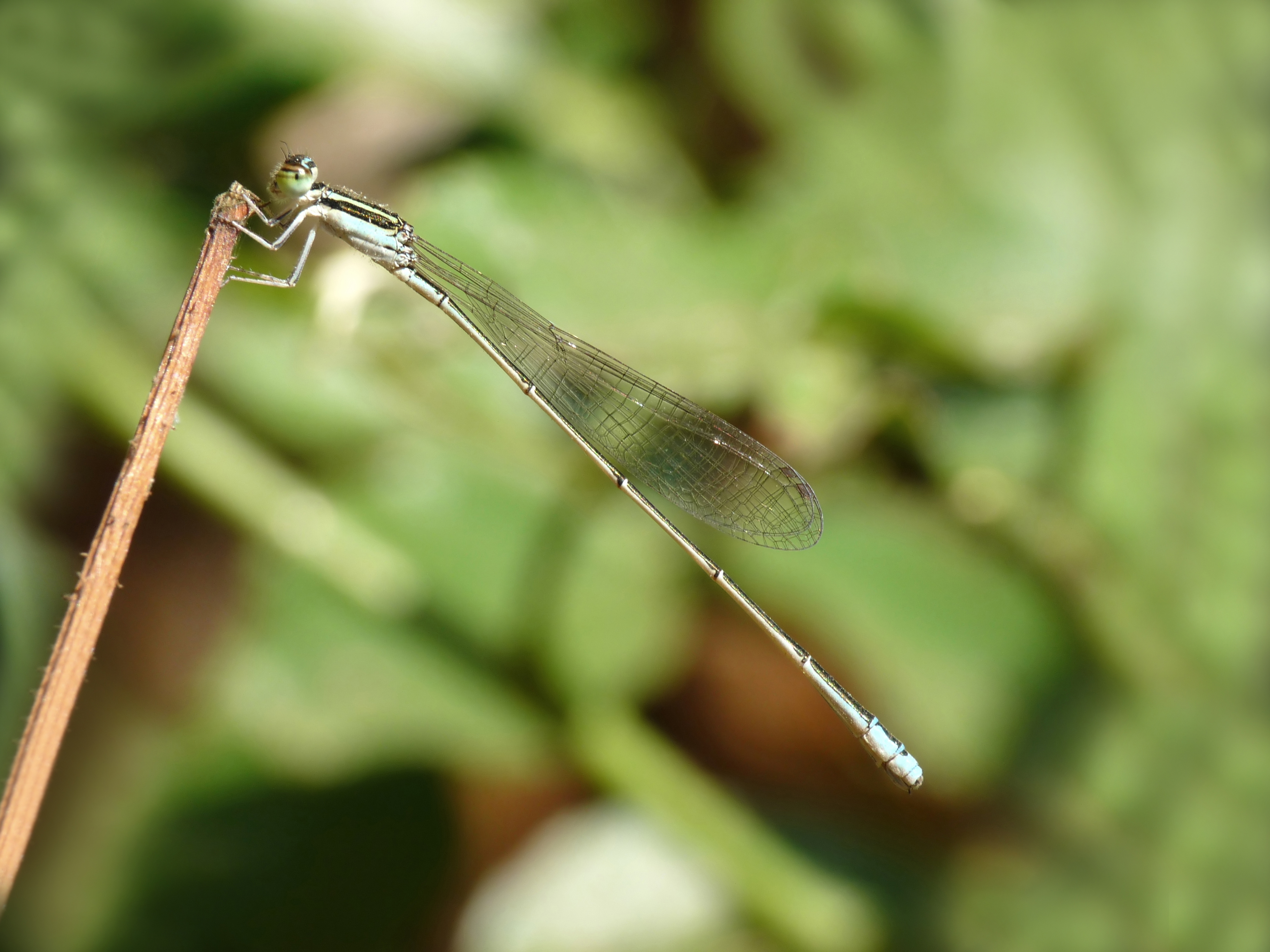
- Aciagrion occidentale, female

Scientific classification
- Kingdom: Animalia
- Phylum: Arthropoda
- Clade: Pancrustacea
- Class: Insecta
- Order: Odonata
- Suborder: Zygoptera
- Family: Coenagrionidae
- Genus: Aciagrion; Selys, 1891
- Likely distribution of Aciagrion

= Aciagrion =

Genus of damselflies

Aciagrion is a genus of damselfly in the family Coenagrionidae. Aciagrion are small and slender damselflies with a small head. They are found at still waters including swamps. Aciagrion is widely distributed in the tropics from Africa, through Indonesia to Australia. They are commonly known as Slims.

== Etymology ==
The genus name Aciagrion is made from two greek words: aci or ἀκίς meaning a pointed object or needle, and agrion or ἄγριος, meaning wild. Agrion was the name given in 1775 by Johan Fabricius for all damselflies.

== Species ==
The genus Aciagrion includes the following species:

- Aciagrion africanum Martin, 1908
- Aciagrion approximans (Selys, 1876)
- Aciagrion azureum Fraser, 1922
- Aciagrion balachowskyi Legrand, 1982 - Gabon Slim
- Aciagrion bapepe Dijkstra, 2015 - Congo Slim
- Aciagrion borneense Ris, 1911
- Aciagrion brosseti Legrand, 1982 - Yellow-winged Slim
- Aciagrion dondoense Dijkstra, 2007 - Opal Slim
- Aciagrion fasciculare Lieftinck, 1934
- Aciagrion feuerborni Schmidt, 1934
- Aciagrion fragile (Tillyard, 1906) - Blue Slim
- Aciagrion gracile (Sjöstedt, 1909) - Graceful Slim
- Aciagrion hamoni Fraser, 1955
- Aciagrion heterostictum Fraser, 1955 - Long Slim
- Aciagrion hisopa (Selys, 1876)
- Aciagrion huaanensis Xu, 2005
- Aciagrion inaequistigma (Fraser, 1953)
- Aciagrion macrootithenae Pinhey, 1972 - Awl-tipped Slim
- Aciagrion maldivense (Laidlaw, 1902)
- Aciagrion migratum (Selys, 1876)
- Aciagrion nodosum (Pinhey, 1964) - Cryptic Slim
- Aciagrion occidentale Laidlaw, 1919
- Aciagrion olympicum Laidlaw, 1919
- Aciagrion pallidum Selys, 1891
- Aciagrion paludense Fraser, 1922
- Aciagrion pinheyi Samways, 2001 - Emerald-striped Slim
- Aciagrion rarum (Longfield, 1947) - Tiny Slim
- Aciagrion steeleae Kimmins, 1955 - Swamp Slim
- Aciagrion tillyardi Laidlaw, 1919
- Aciagrion tonsillare Lieftinck, 1937
- Aciagrion zambiense Pinhey, 1972
