= Aciagrion rarum =

Conservation status
- Data Deficient (IUCN 3.1)

Scientific classification
- Kingdom: Animalia
- Phylum: Arthropoda
- Class: Insecta
- Order: Odonata
- Suborder: Zygoptera
- Family: Coenagrionidae
- Genus: Aciagrion
- Species: A. rarum

Binomial name
- Aciagrion rarum (Longfield, 1947)

Species of damselfly

Aciagrion rarum is a species of damselfly in the family Coenagrionidae. It is found in Angola and Zambia. Its natural habitats are rivers and swamps.
