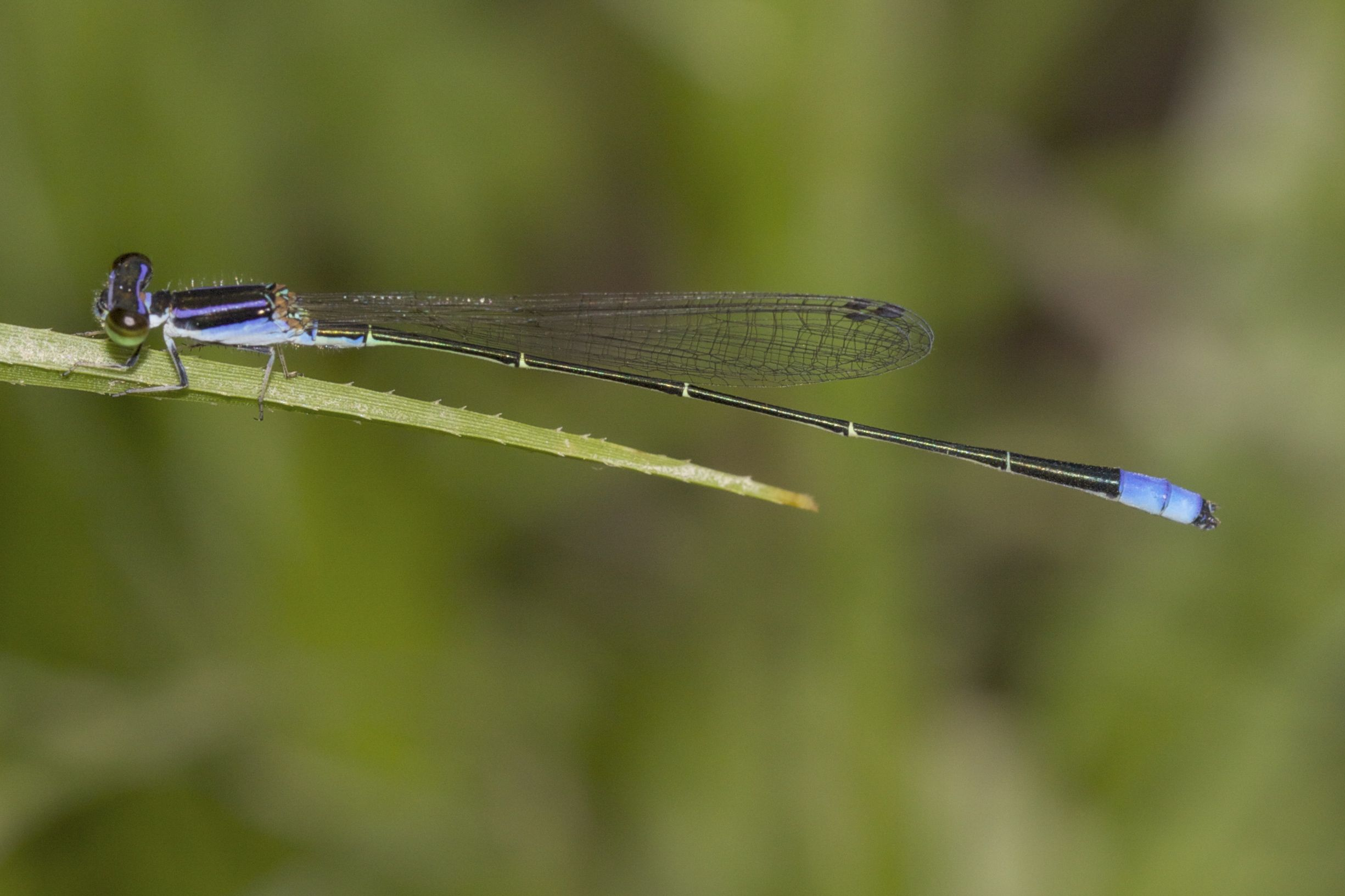
- A. a. approximans
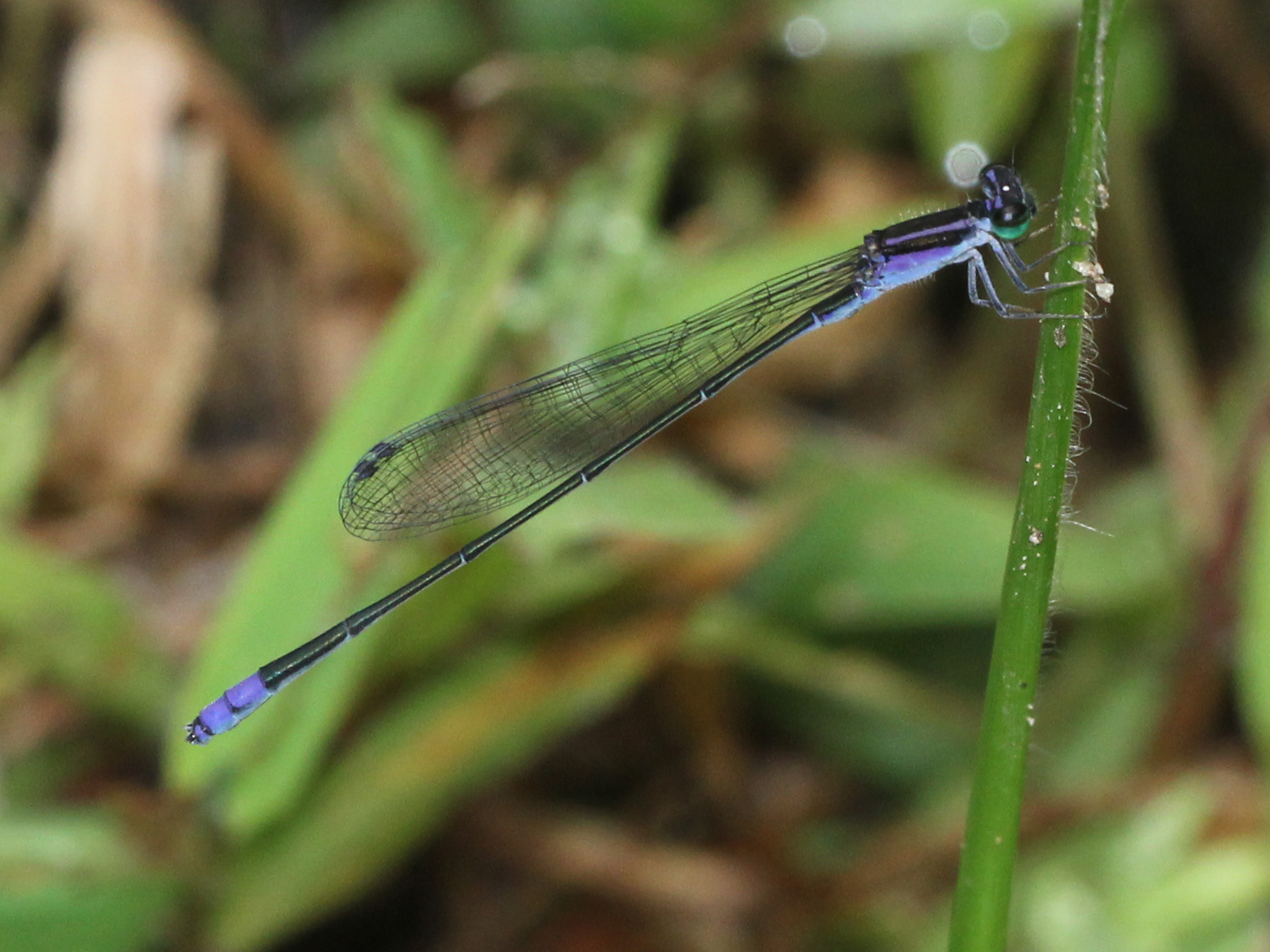
- A. a. krishna

Conservation status
- Least Concern (IUCN 3.1)

Scientific classification
- Kingdom: Animalia
- Phylum: Arthropoda
- Clade: Pancrustacea
- Class: Insecta
- Order: Odonata
- Suborder: Zygoptera
- Family: Coenagrionidae
- Genus: Aciagrion
- Species: A. approximans

Binomial name
- Aciagrion approximans (Selys, 1876)

Synonyms
- Pseudagrion approximans Selys, 1876; Aciagrion tillyardi Laidlaw, 1919; Enallagma assamica Fraser, 1919; Aciagrion krishna Fraser, 1921

= Aciagrion approximans =

Species of damselfly

Aciagrion approximans, Indian violet dartlet, is a species of damselfly in the family Coenagrionidae. It is found in east and south of India. The range extends to Thailand, China and Cambodia.

== Subspecies ==
Fraser considered the specimen found in northeast as Aciagrion approximans and in south as Aciargion hisopa race krishna. A recent study revealed that the subspecies krishna found in south is not conspecific with A. hisopa and found to be very close to A. approximans found in northeast; but differing at the level of subspecies.

- Aciagrion approximans approximans (Northeast India)
- Aciagrion approximans krishna (Western Ghats)

== Description and habitat ==
It is a small, slim, slender damselfly with violet and black colors. Its thorax is black with lateral violet stripes. Segments 2 to 7 of the abdomen are black on dorsum and violet in the ventral half. Segments 8 and 9 are violet without any marks. Segment 10 is black on dorsum. The lower half of segment 8 is marked with black in A. a. krishna. Female is similar to the male; but paler in colors. Segments 8 and 9 are black and 10 is blue on dorsum.

It breeds in ponds, lakes or in slow moving streams.

== See also ==
- List of odonates of India
- List of odonata of Kerala
