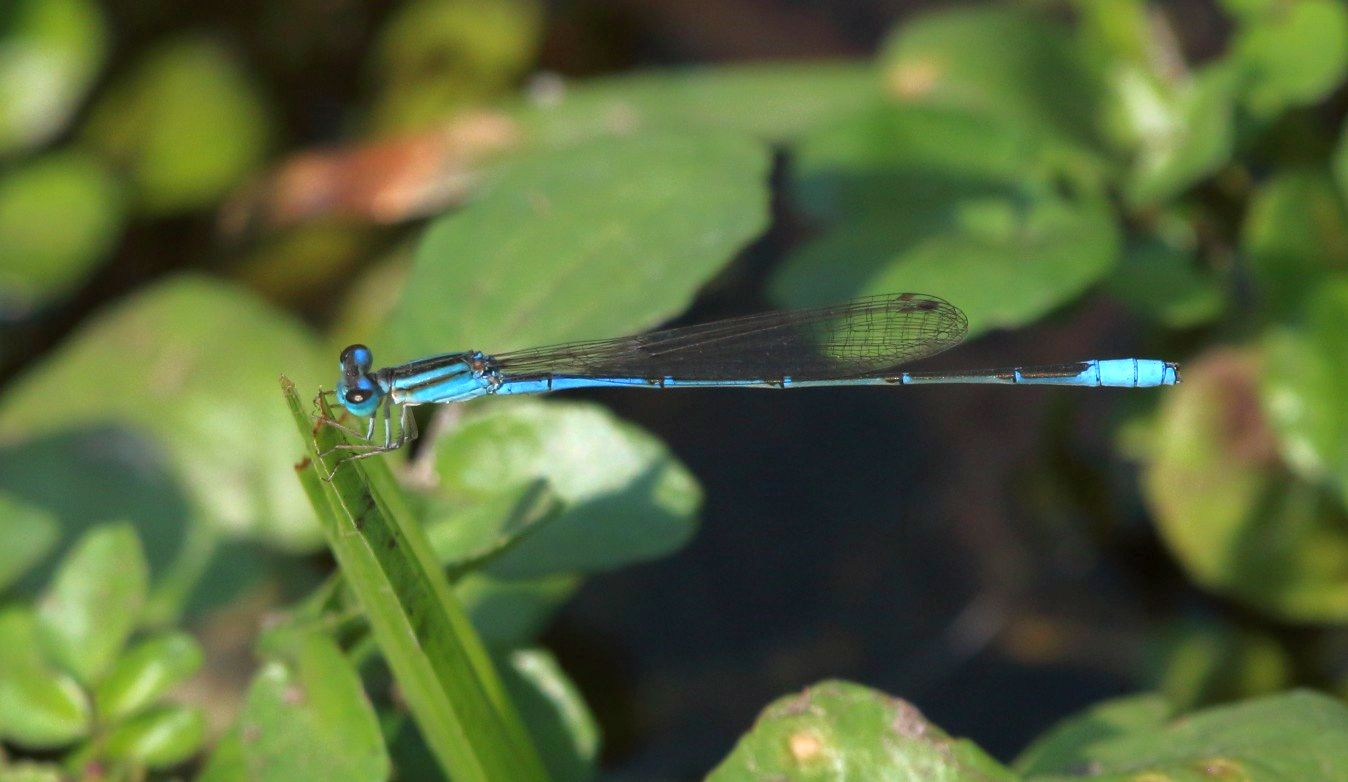
- Male

Conservation status
- Least Concern (IUCN 3.1)

Scientific classification
- Kingdom: Animalia
- Phylum: Arthropoda
- Class: Insecta
- Order: Odonata
- Suborder: Zygoptera
- Family: Coenagrionidae
- Genus: Africallagma
- Species: A. fractum

Binomial name
- Africallagma fractum (Ris, 1921)

= Africallagma fractum =

Species of damselfly

Africallagma fractum, the slender bluet, is a species of damselfly in the family of Coenagrionidae. It has been found in Angola, southern Democratic Republic of the Congo, Zambia, Malawi, Mozambique, Zimbabwe, and eastern South Africa.

== Taxonomy ==
This taxon has been lumped with Africallagma elongatum in the past but it is now recognized as a separate species by most authorities.
