= Africallagma cuneistigma =

Conservation status
- Critically Endangered (IUCN 3.1)

Scientific classification
- Kingdom: Animalia
- Phylum: Arthropoda
- Class: Insecta
- Order: Odonata
- Suborder: Zygoptera
- Family: Coenagrionidae
- Genus: Africallagma
- Species: A. cuneistigma

Binomial name
- Africallagma cuneistigma (Pinhey, 1969)

Species of damselfly

Africallagma cuneistigma is a species of damselfly in the family Coenagrionidae. It is endemic to Zimbabwe. Its natural habitats are subtropical or tropical moist montane forests and rivers. It is threatened by habitat loss.
