= Africallagma sinuatum =

Conservation status
- Least Concern (IUCN 3.1)

Scientific classification
- Kingdom: Animalia
- Phylum: Arthropoda
- Class: Insecta
- Order: Odonata
- Suborder: Zygoptera
- Family: Coenagrionidae
- Genus: Africallagma
- Species: A. sinuatum

Binomial name
- Africallagma sinuatum (Ris, 1921)

Synonyms
- Enallagma sinuatum Ris, 1921

Species of damselfly

Africallagma sinuatum is a species of damselfly in the family Coenagrionidae. It is found in the Democratic Republic of the Congo, Ethiopia, Malawi, South Africa, Tanzania, Zambia, and Zimbabwe. Its natural habitats are subtropical or tropical moist lowland forests, dry and moist savanna, subtropical or tropical dry and moist shrubland, rivers, lakes, marshes, and other wetlands.
