= Africallagma subtile =

Conservation status
- Least Concern (IUCN 3.1)

Scientific classification
- Kingdom: Animalia
- Phylum: Arthropoda
- Class: Insecta
- Order: Odonata
- Suborder: Zygoptera
- Family: Coenagrionidae
- Genus: Africallagma
- Species: A. subtile

Binomial name
- Africallagma subtile (Ris, 1921)

Species of damselfly

Africallagma subtile is a species of damselfly in the family Coenagrionidae. It is found in Botswana, the Republic of the Congo, the Democratic Republic of the Congo, Ethiopia, Guinea, Kenya, Malawi, Mozambique, Namibia, Nigeria, Senegal, Sierra Leone, Tanzania, Uganda, Zambia, Zimbabwe, and possibly Burundi. Its natural habitats are subtropical or tropical dry and moist lowland forests, dry and moist savanna, subtropical or tropical dry shrubland, intermittent rivers, shrub-dominated wetlands, swamps, and marshes.
