= Africallagma vaginale =

Conservation status
- Least Concern (IUCN 3.1)

Scientific classification
- Kingdom: Animalia
- Phylum: Arthropoda
- Class: Insecta
- Order: Odonata
- Suborder: Zygoptera
- Family: Coenagrionidae
- Genus: Africallagma
- Species: A. vaginale

Binomial name
- Africallagma vaginale (Sjöstedt, 1917)

Species of damselfly

Africallagma vaginale is a species of damselfly in the family Coenagrionidae. It is found in the Democratic Republic of the Congo, Kenya, Tanzania, Uganda, Zambia, and possibly Burundi. Its natural habitats are subtropical or tropical dry and moist lowland forests; subtropical or tropical moist lowland forests; subtropical or tropical moist shrubland, rivers, lakes, marshes; and shrub-dominated wetlands.
