= Africallagma pseudelongatum =

Conservation status
- Least Concern (IUCN 3.1)

Scientific classification
- Kingdom: Animalia
- Phylum: Arthropoda
- Class: Insecta
- Order: Odonata
- Suborder: Zygoptera
- Family: Coenagrionidae
- Genus: Africallagma
- Species: A. pseudelongatum

Binomial name
- Africallagma pseudelongatum (Longfield, 1936)

Species of damselfly

Africallagma pseudelongatum is a species of damselfly in the family Coenagrionidae. It is found in Kenya, Uganda, possibly Burundi, and possibly Tanzania. Its natural habitats are subtropical or tropical moist lowland forests, subtropical or tropical moist montane forests, subtropical or tropical high-altitude shrubland, subtropical or tropical high-altitude grassland, rivers, intermittent rivers, shrub-dominated wetlands, intermittent freshwater marshes, and freshwater springs.
