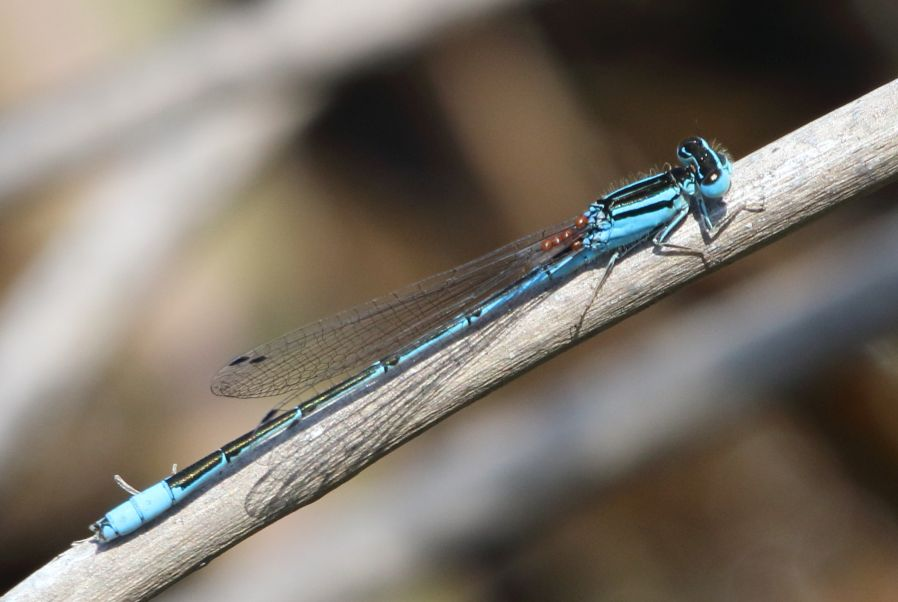
- Male

Conservation status
- Least Concern (IUCN 3.1)

Scientific classification
- Kingdom: Animalia
- Phylum: Arthropoda
- Class: Insecta
- Order: Odonata
- Suborder: Zygoptera
- Family: Coenagrionidae
- Genus: Africallagma
- Species: A. glaucum

Binomial name
- Africallagma glaucum (Burmeister, 1839)

= Africallagma glaucum =

Species of damselfly

Africallagma glaucum is a species of damselfly in the family Coenagrionidae. It is found in Botswana, Gabon, Ghana, Kenya, Malawi, Mozambique, Namibia, Nigeria, Réunion, South Africa, Tanzania, Uganda, Zambia, Zimbabwe, and possibly Burundi. Its natural habitats are subtropical or tropical dry shrubland, subtropical or tropical moist shrubland, subtropical or tropical dry lowland grassland, swamps, intermittent freshwater lakes, intermittent freshwater marshes, and freshwater springs.
