= Africallagma elongatum =

Conservation status
- Least Concern (IUCN 3.1)

Scientific classification
- Kingdom: Animalia
- Phylum: Arthropoda
- Class: Insecta
- Order: Odonata
- Suborder: Zygoptera
- Family: Coenagrionidae
- Genus: Africallagma
- Species: A. elongatum

Binomial name
- Africallagma elongatum (Martin, 1907)

Synonyms
- Enallagma elongatum Martin, 1907

Species of damselfly

Africallagma elongatum is a species of damselfly in the family Coenagrionidae. It is known by the common name elongate bluet. It is found in Ethiopia, Kenya, Uganda, Rwanda and northern Tanzania; it is most common in highlands. Its natural habitats include tropical swamps, reedy streams, pools and lake shores.

== Taxonomy ==
Although it has been lumped with Africallagma fractum, most authorities now recognize both taxa as valid species.
