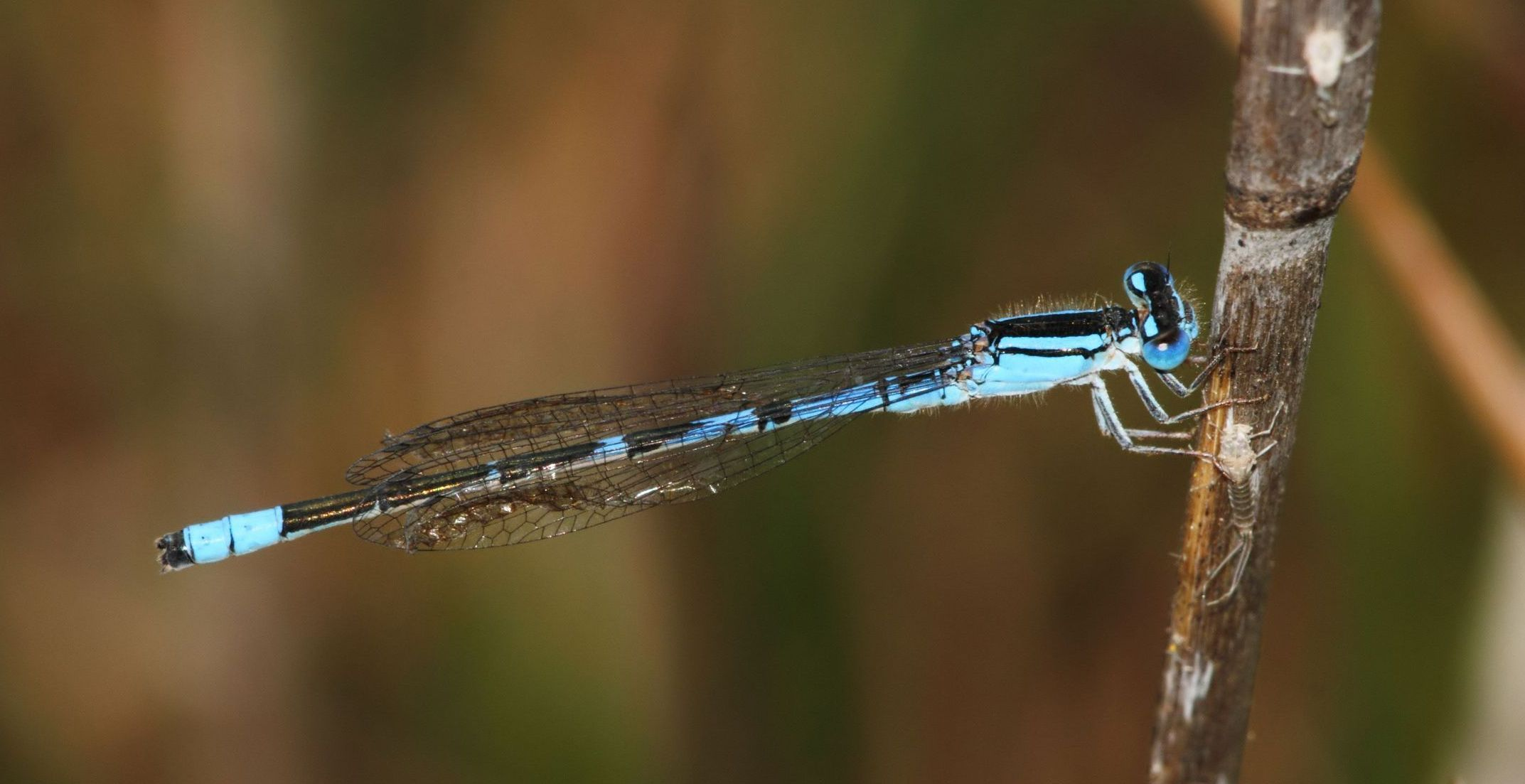
- Male

Conservation status
- Least Concern (IUCN 3.1)

Scientific classification
- Kingdom: Animalia
- Phylum: Arthropoda
- Class: Insecta
- Order: Odonata
- Suborder: Zygoptera
- Family: Coenagrionidae
- Genus: Africallagma
- Species: A. sapphirinum

Binomial name
- Africallagma sapphirinum (Pinhey, 1950)

= Africallagma sapphirinum =

Species of damselfly

Africallagma sapphirinum, the sapphire bluet, is a species of damselfly in the family Coenagrionidae. It is endemic to South Africa, where it is locally common.

This species is found in grassland, where its natural habitat is ponds and lakes with floating aquatic plants.

This bluet is 24–28 mm long, with a wingspan of 26–33 mm. The thorax is sapphire-blue with black dorsal and antehumeral stripes. The abdomen is deep blue and black; segments one to five are mainly sapphire-blue with a discontinuous black dorsal stripe, segments eight and nine are blue and segments six, seven and ten are mostly black.

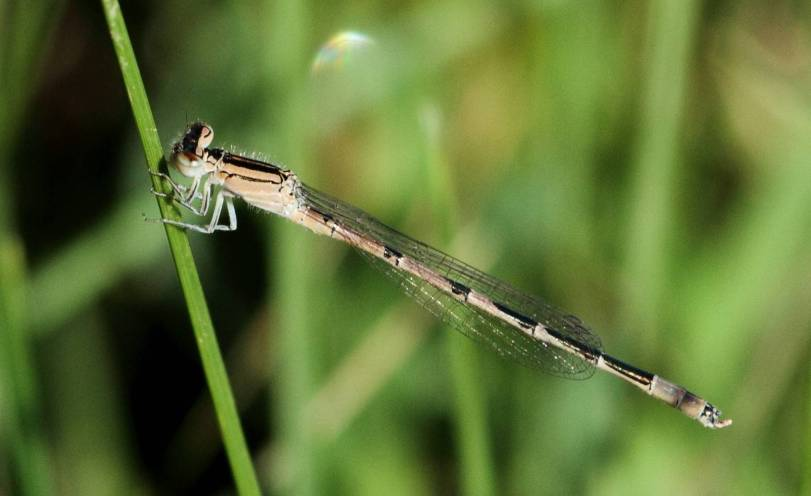
Immature male

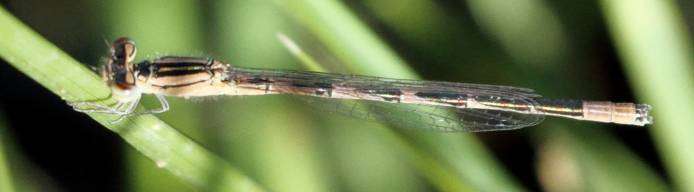
Immature male

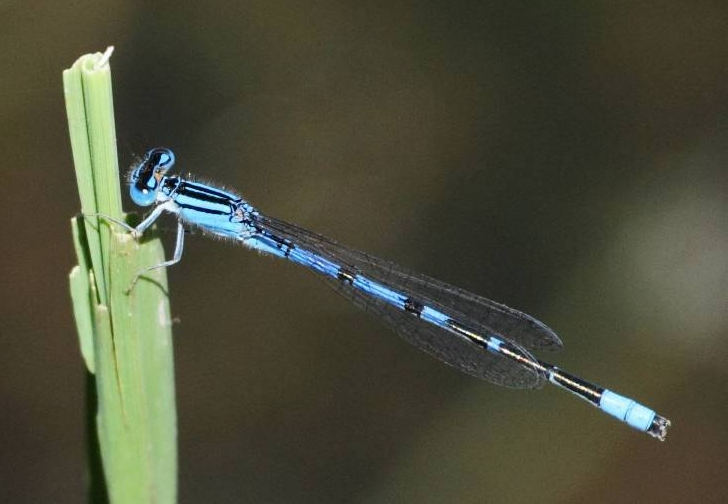
Male

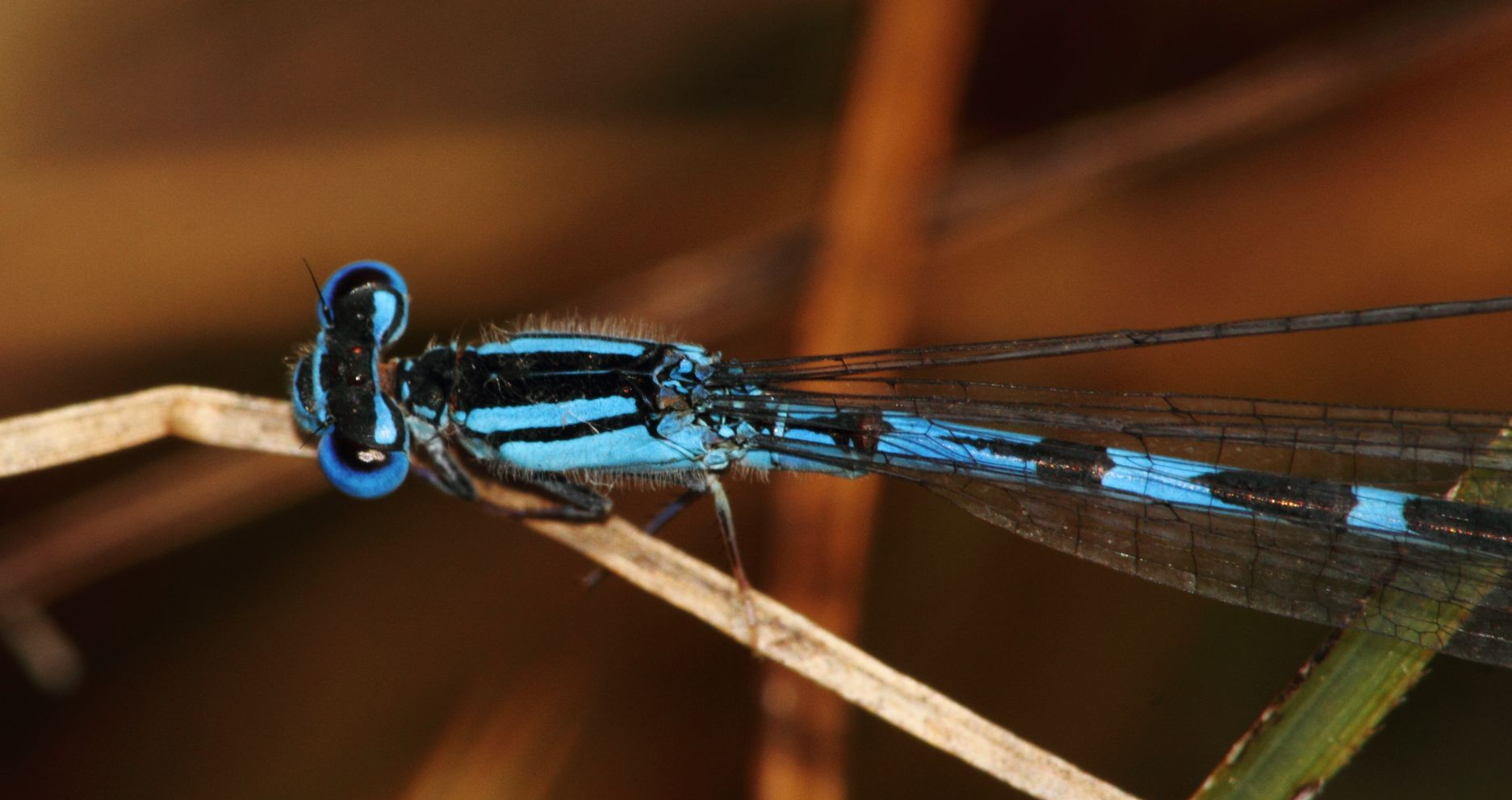
Male

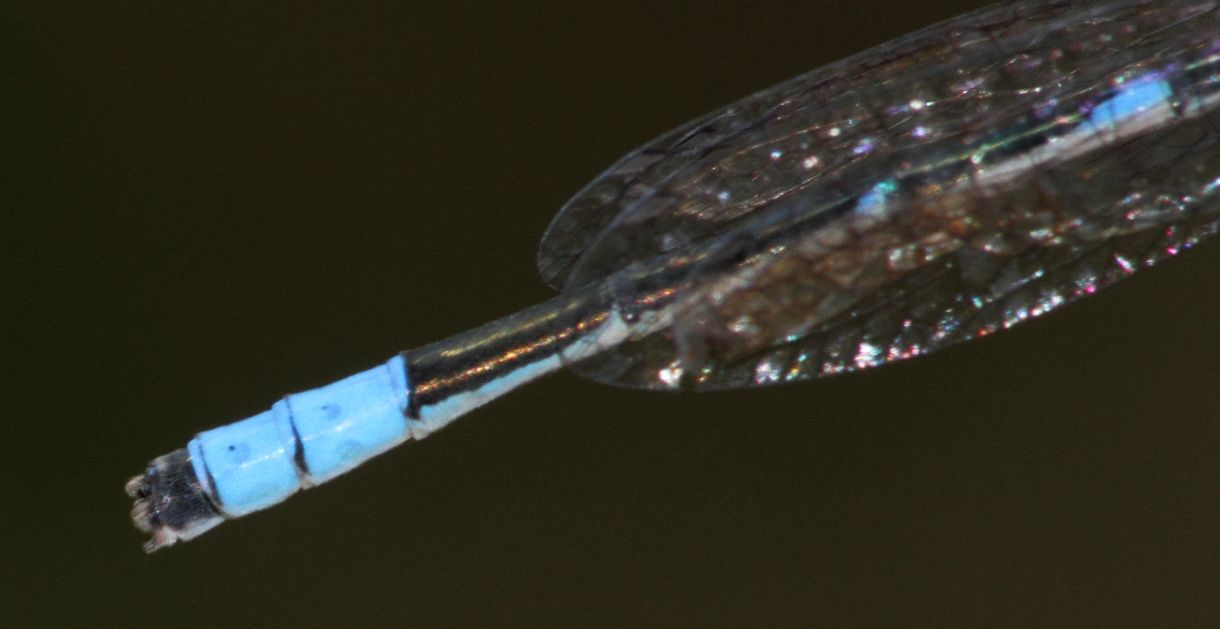
Male abdomen

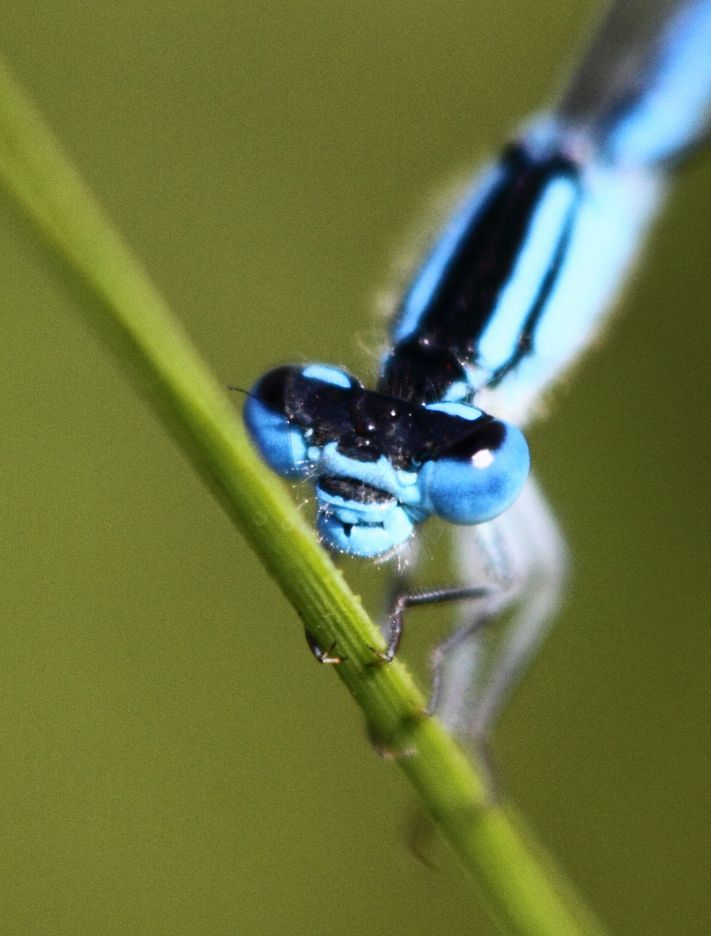
Male head

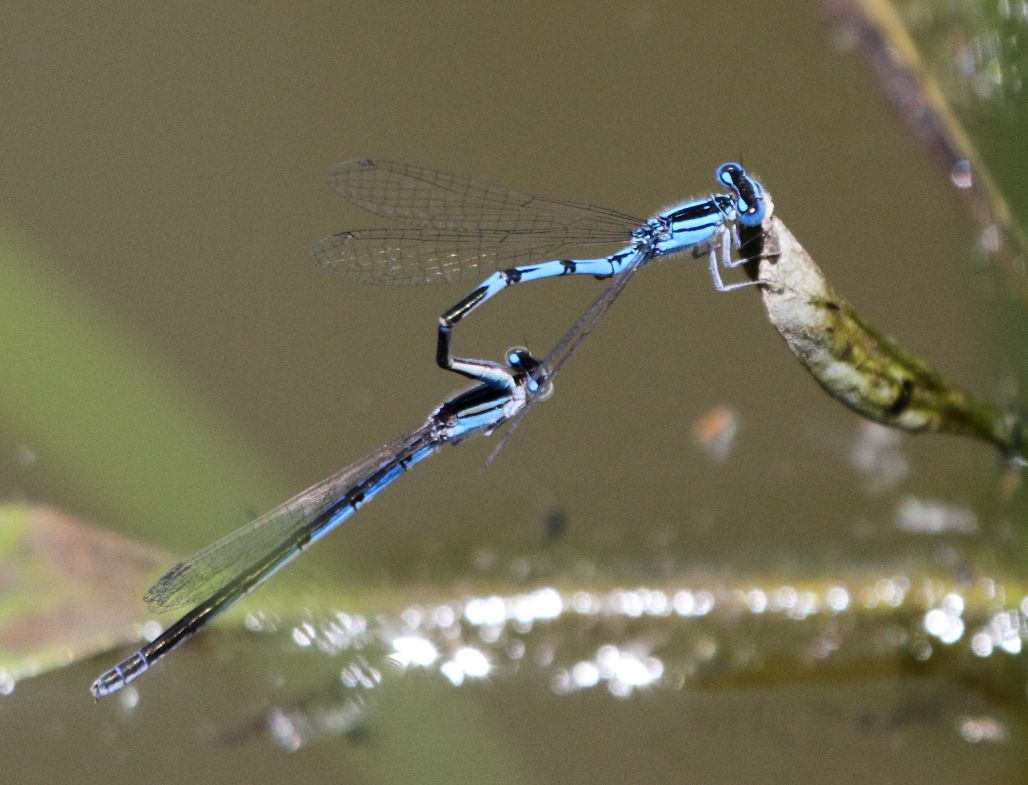
Mating pair

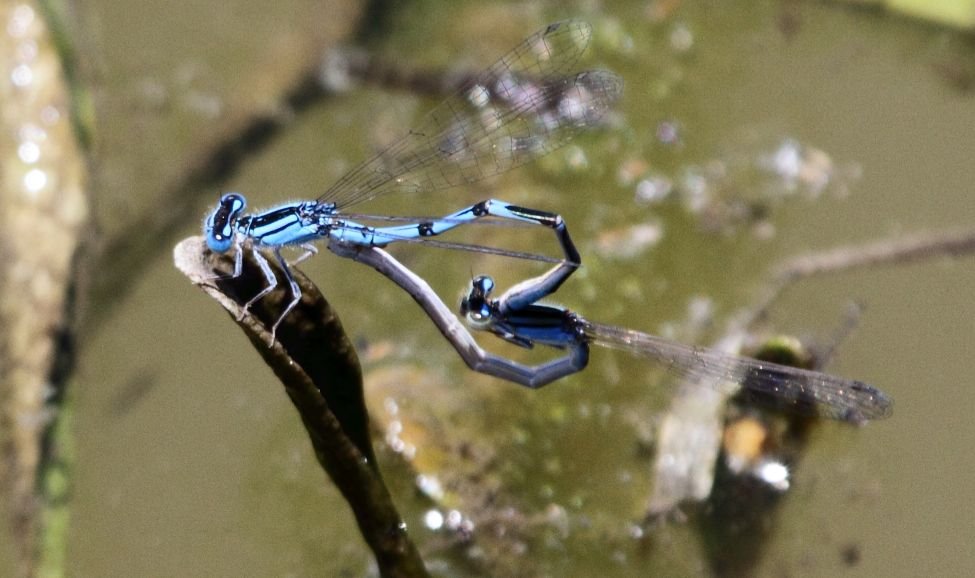
Mating pair
