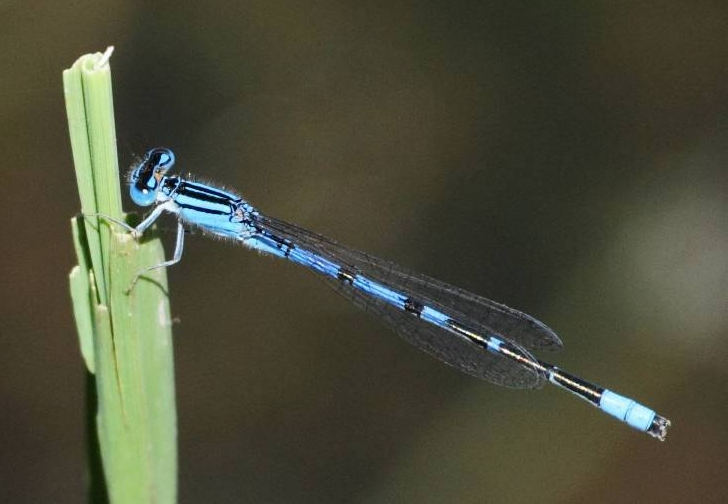
- sapphire bluet (Africallagma sapphirinum)

Scientific classification
- Kingdom: Animalia
- Phylum: Arthropoda
- Class: Insecta
- Order: Odonata
- Suborder: Zygoptera
- Family: Coenagrionidae
- Genus: Africallagma; Kennedy, 1920

= Africallagma =

Genus of damselflies

Africallagma is a genus of damselfly in the family Coenagrionidae.

== Species ==
Species include:

- Africallagma cuneistigma (Pinhey, 1969)
- Africallagma elongatum (Martin, 1907) - Slender Bluet
- Africallagma fractum (Ris, 1921)
- Africallagma glaucum (Burmeister, 1839) - Swamp Bluet
- Africallagma pallidulum Dijkstra, 2007
- Africallagma pseudelongatum (Longfield, 1936) - Sprite Bluet
- Africallagma quingentum Dijkstra, 2015
- Africallagma rubristigma (Schmidt, 1951)
- Africallagma sapphirinum (Pinhey, 1950) - Sapphire Bluet
- Africallagma sinuatum (Ris, 1921) - Peak Bluet
- Africallagma subtile (Ris, 1921) - Pale Bluet
- Africallagma vaginale (Sjöstedt, 1917)
