= Odonata of the Dang, Gujarat =

== List of Odonata of the Dang, Gujarat. ==
The following is a list of the dragonflies and damselflies found in Dang, Gujarat.

== Suborder: Anisoptera ==
=== Family : Aeshnidae ===
==== Anax guttatus ====
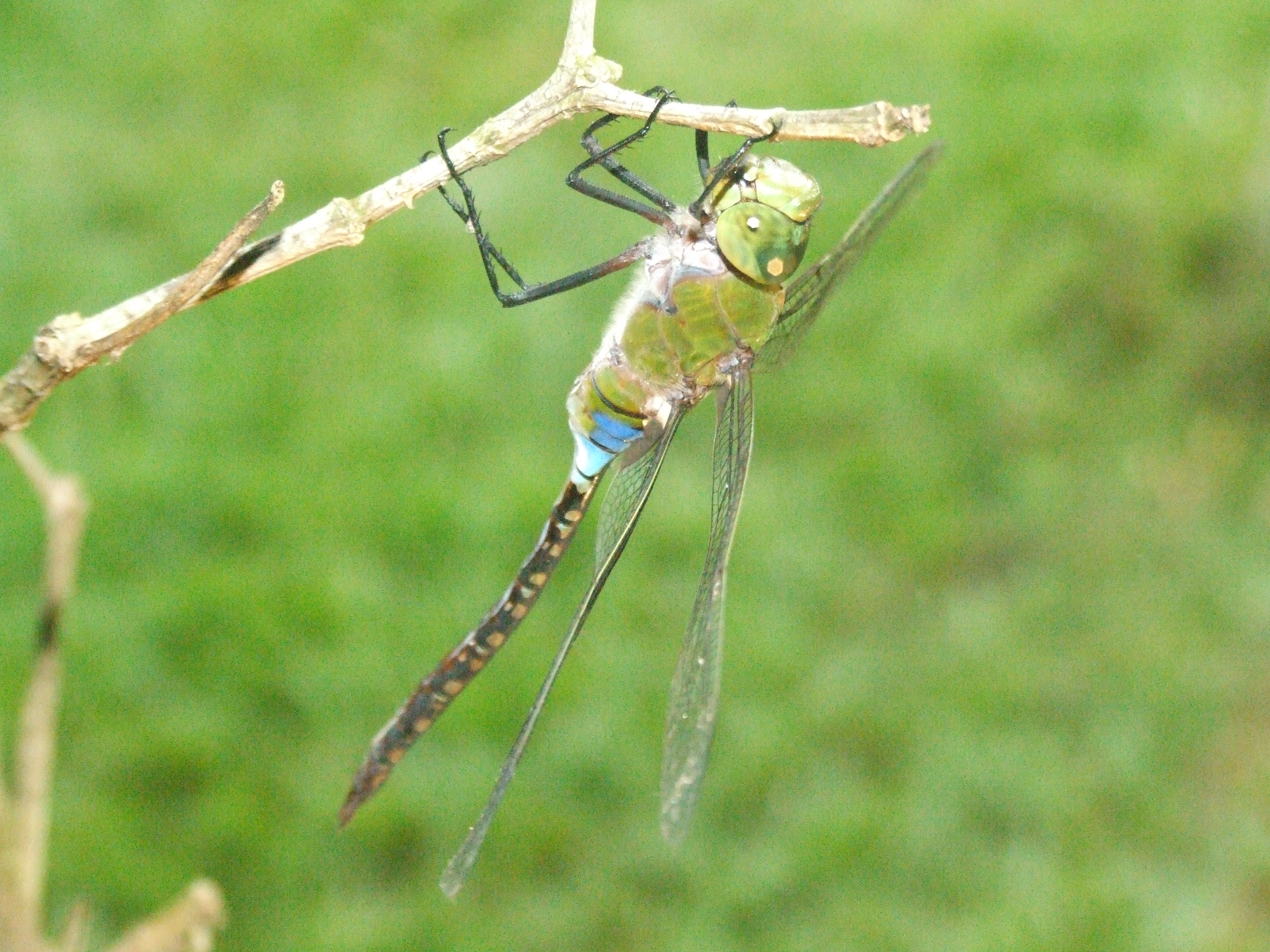

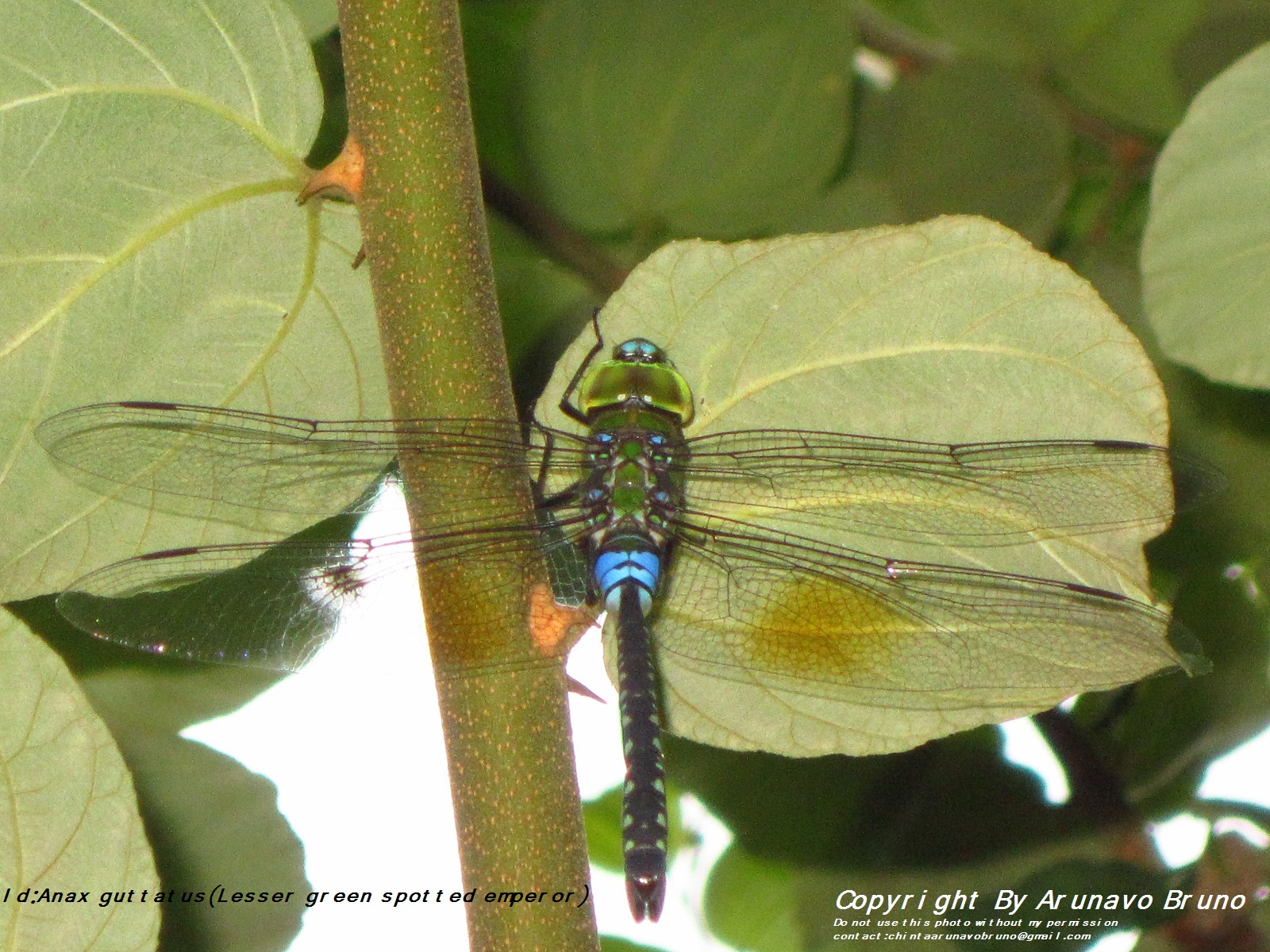

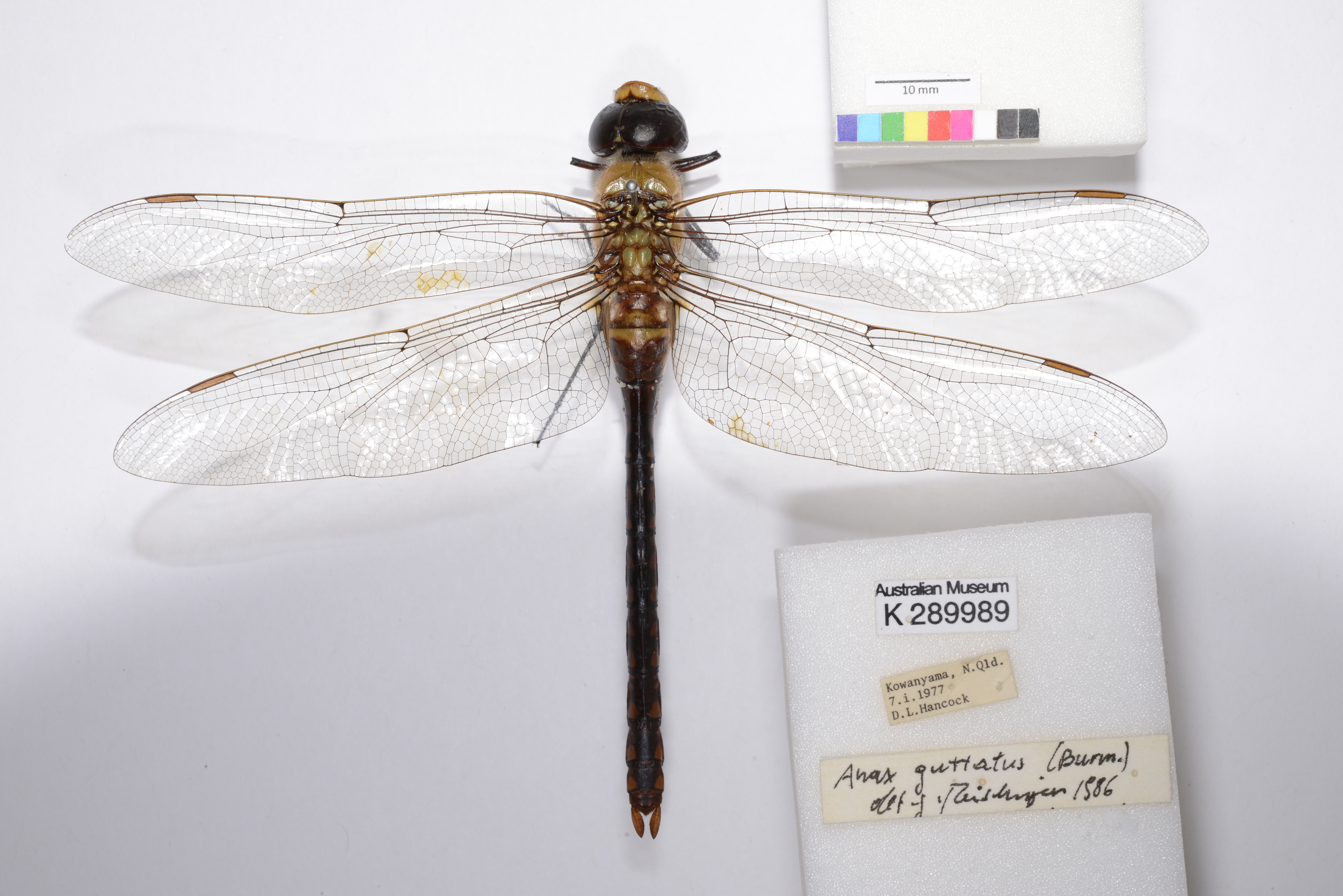

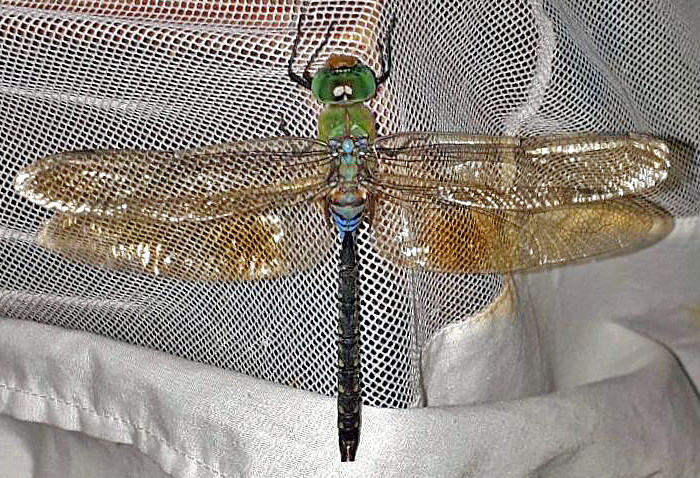

==== Anax immaculifrons ====
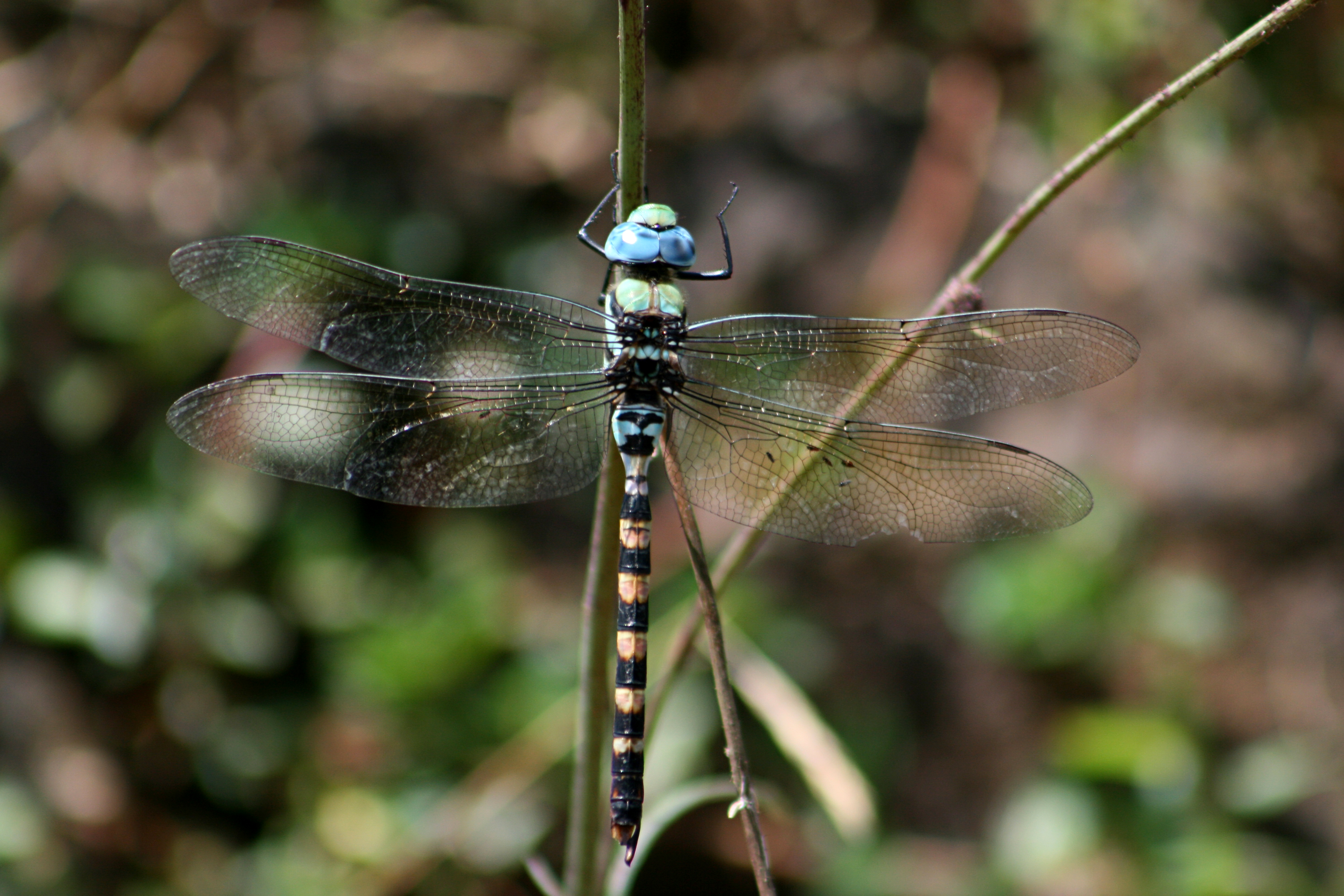

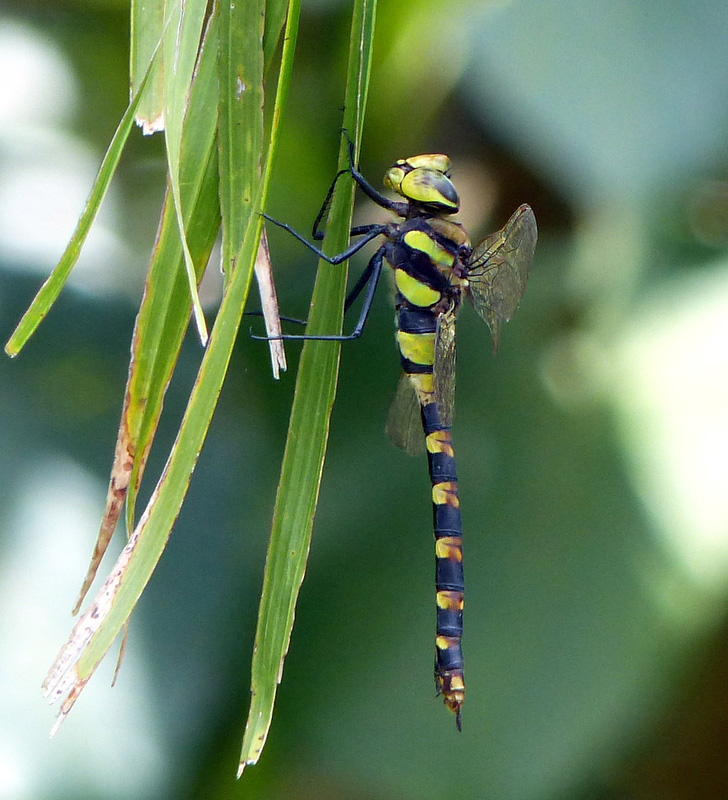

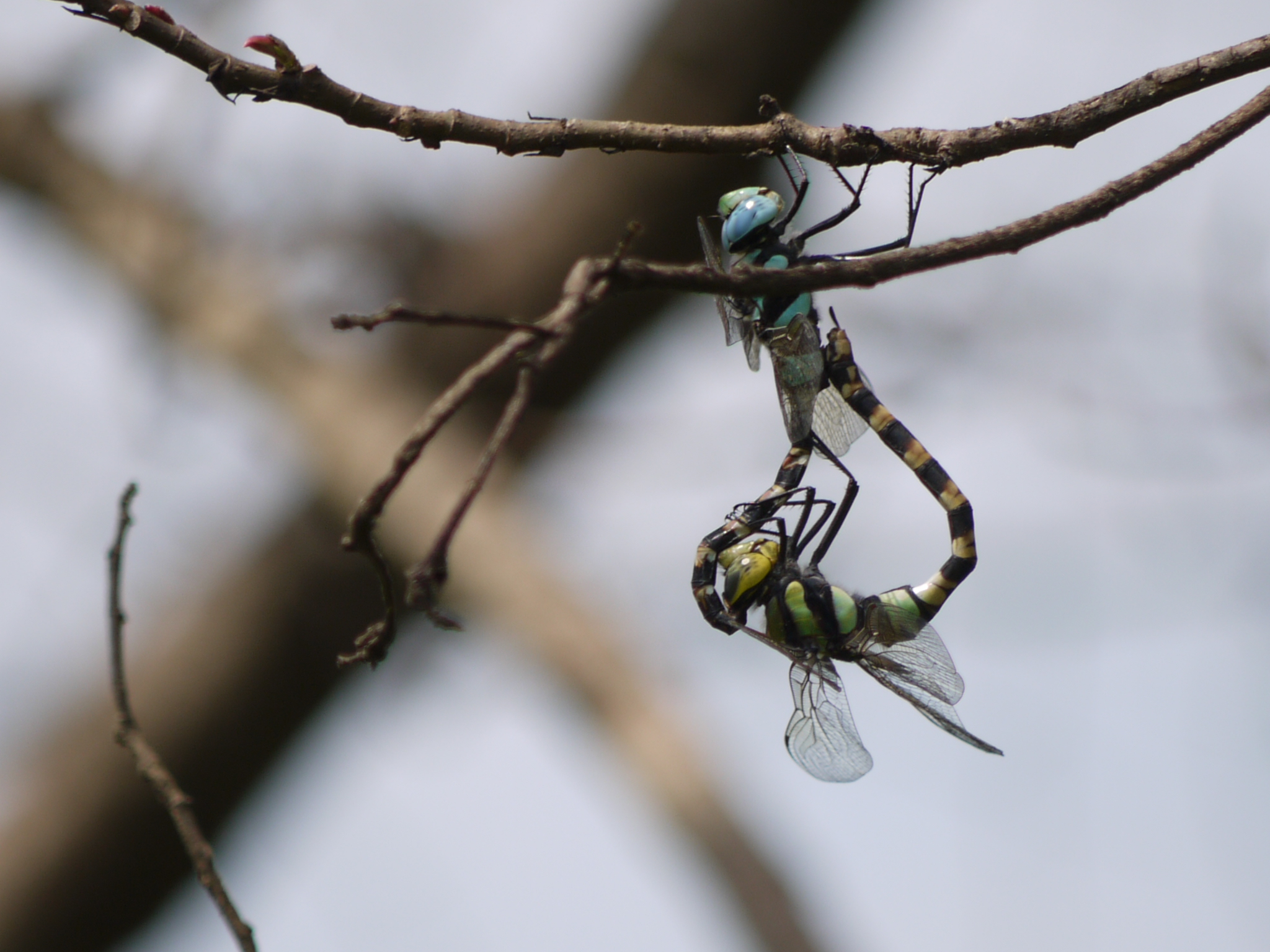

=== Family : Gomphidae ===
==== Burmagomphus laidlawi ====
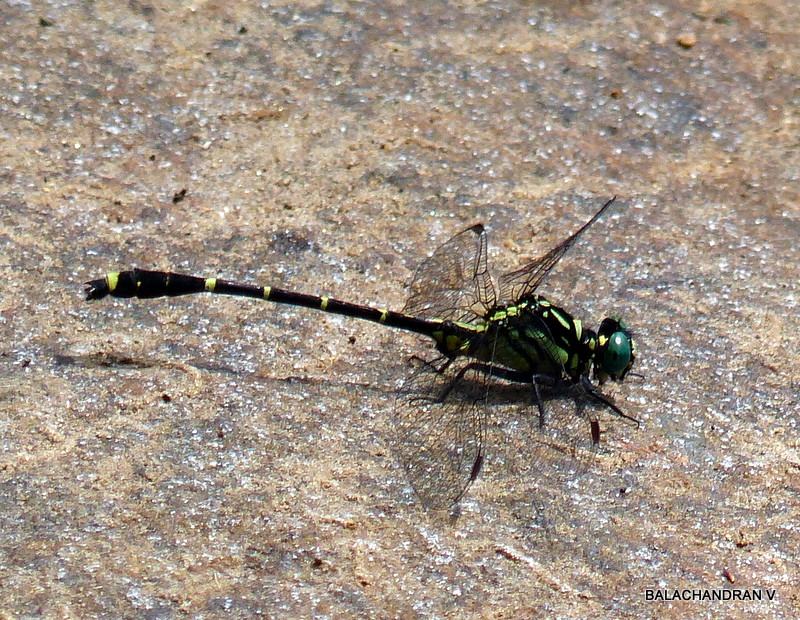

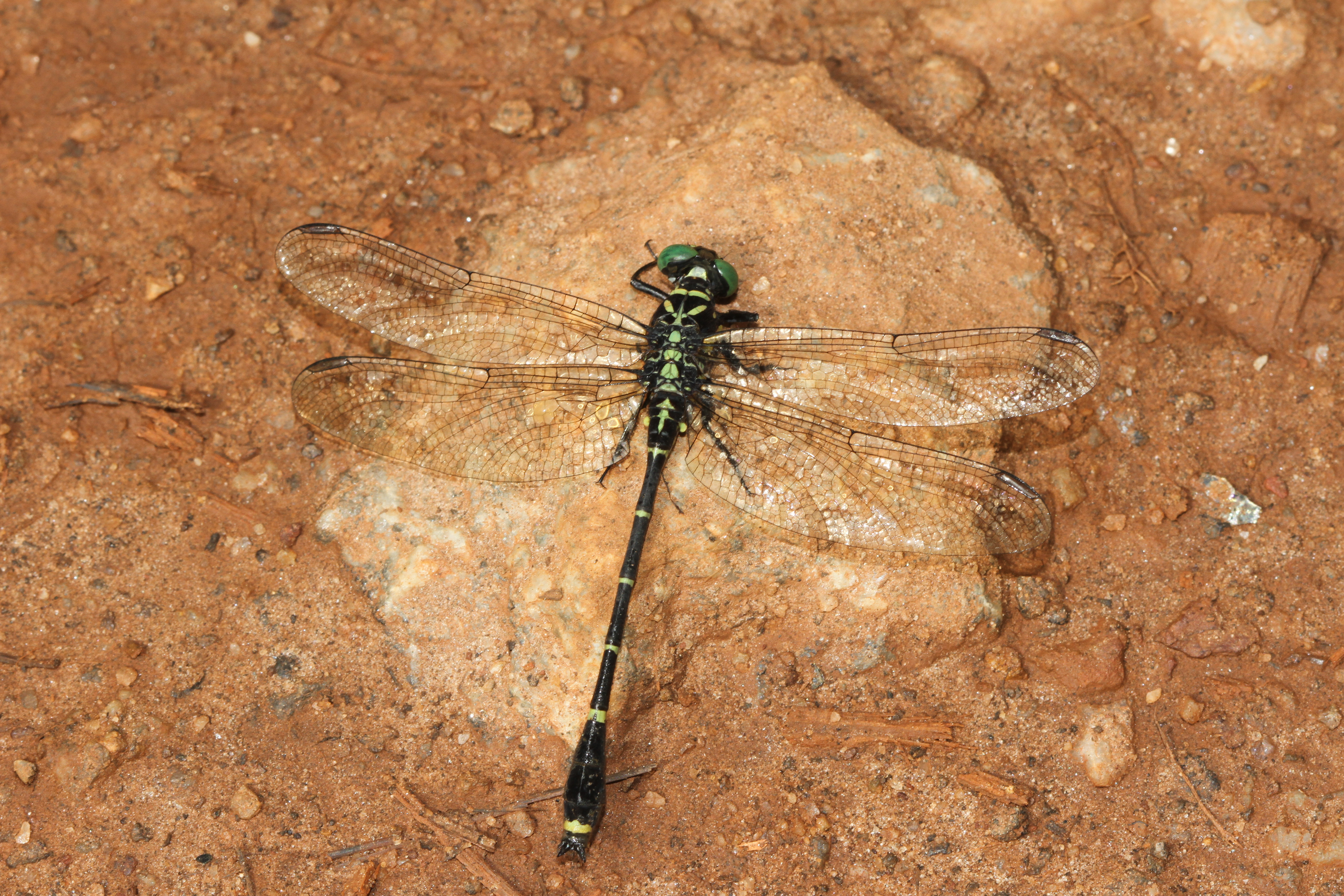

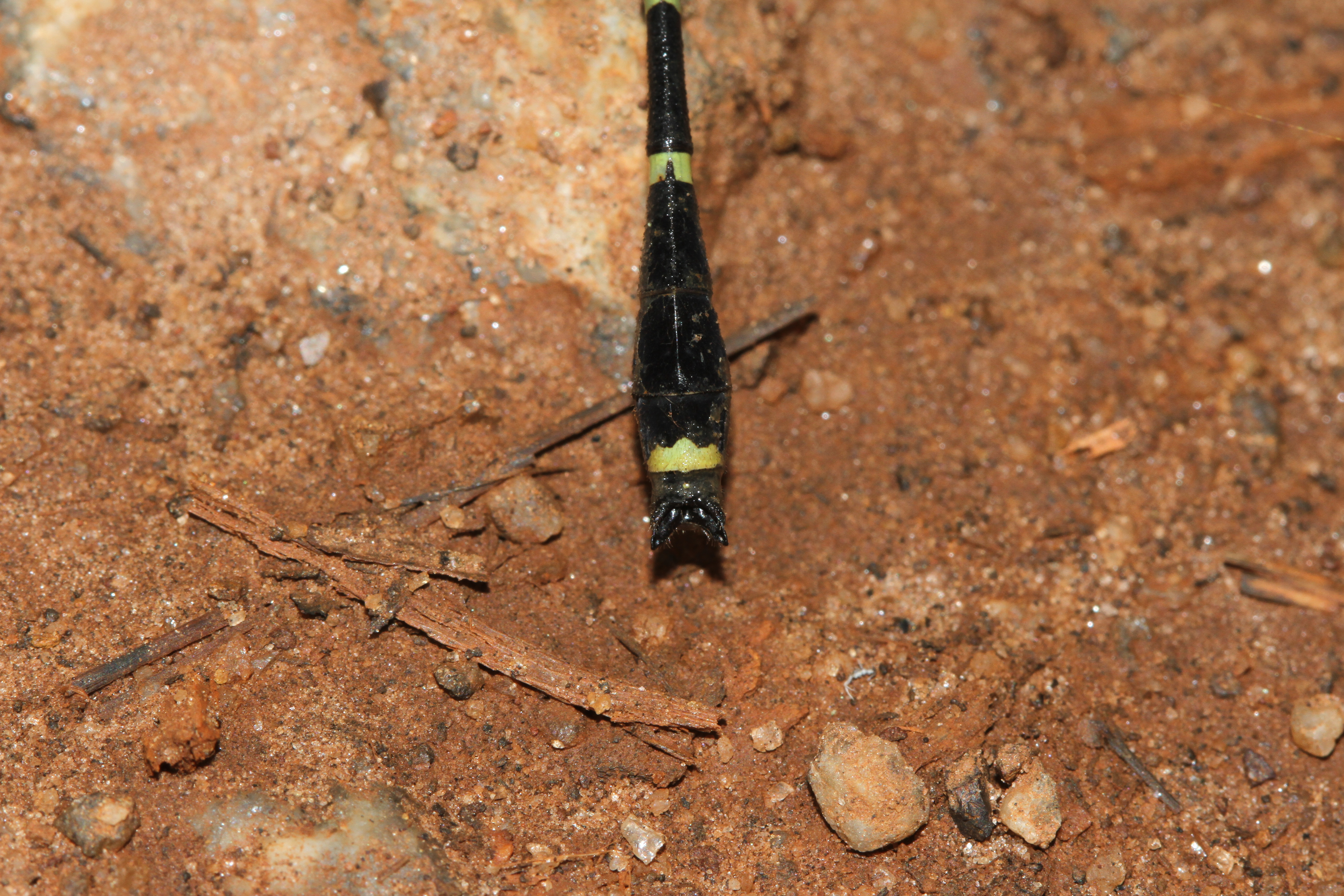

==== Cyclogomphus ypsilon ====
===== Ictinogomphus rapax =====
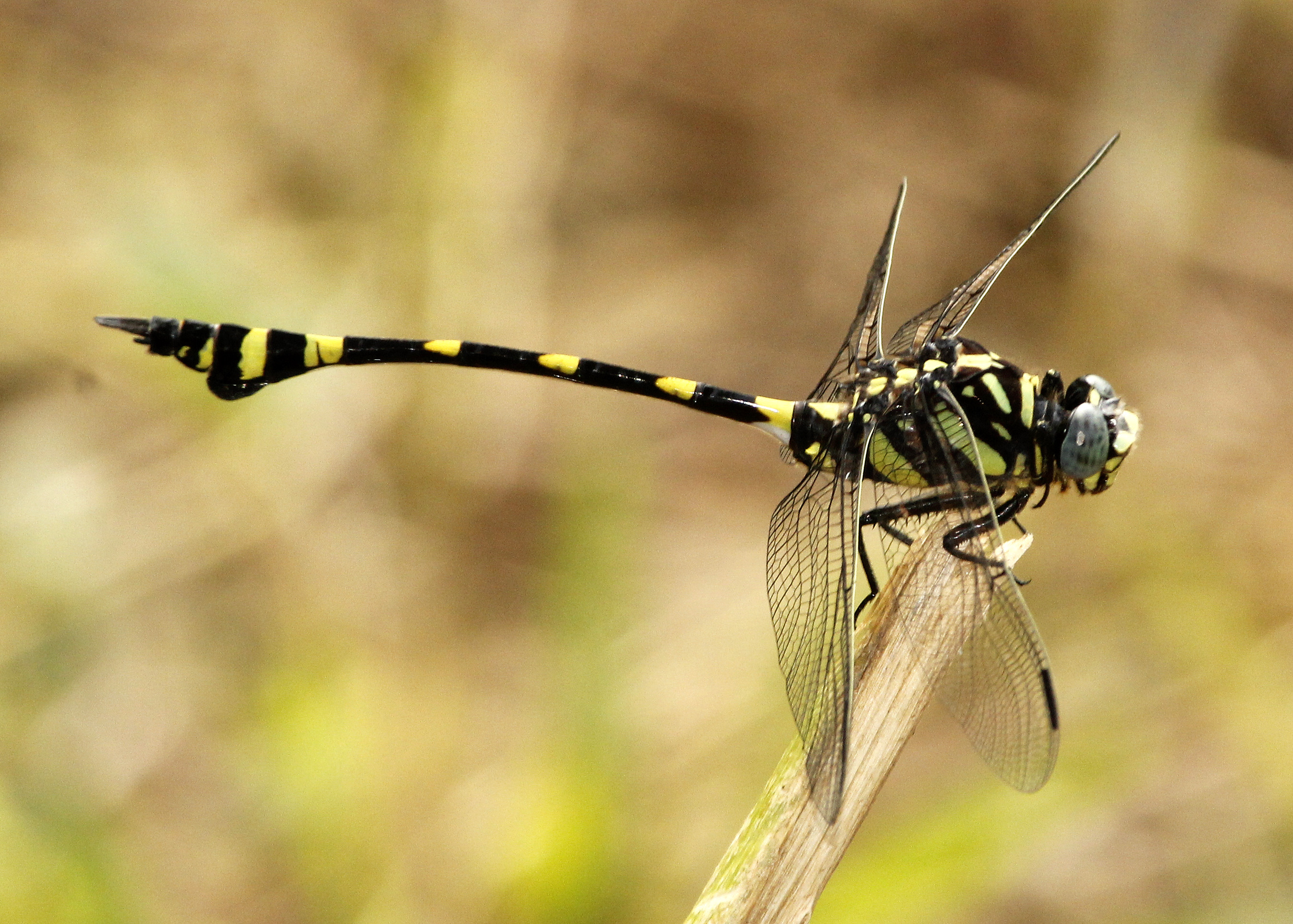

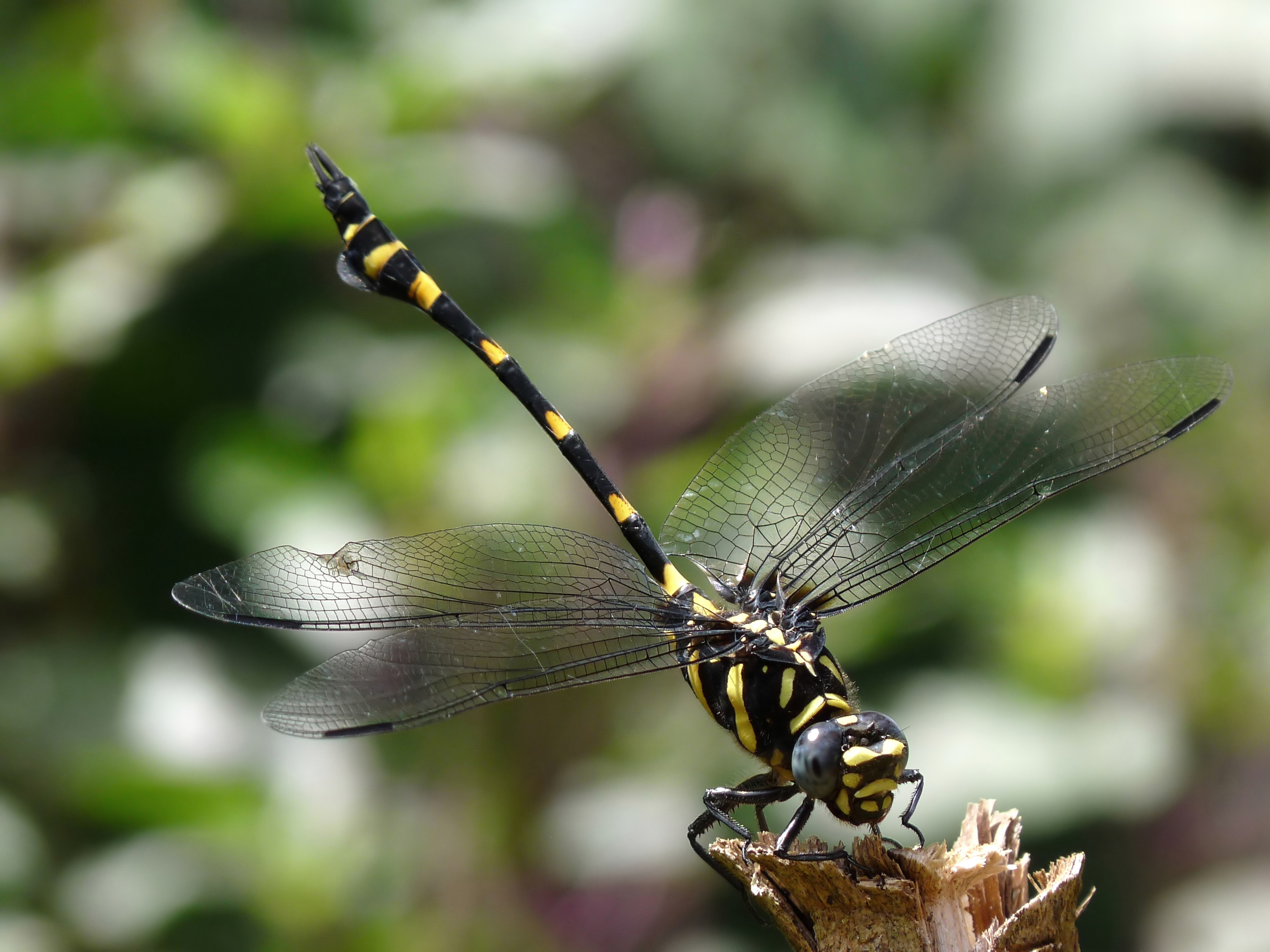

==== Onychogomphus acinaces ====
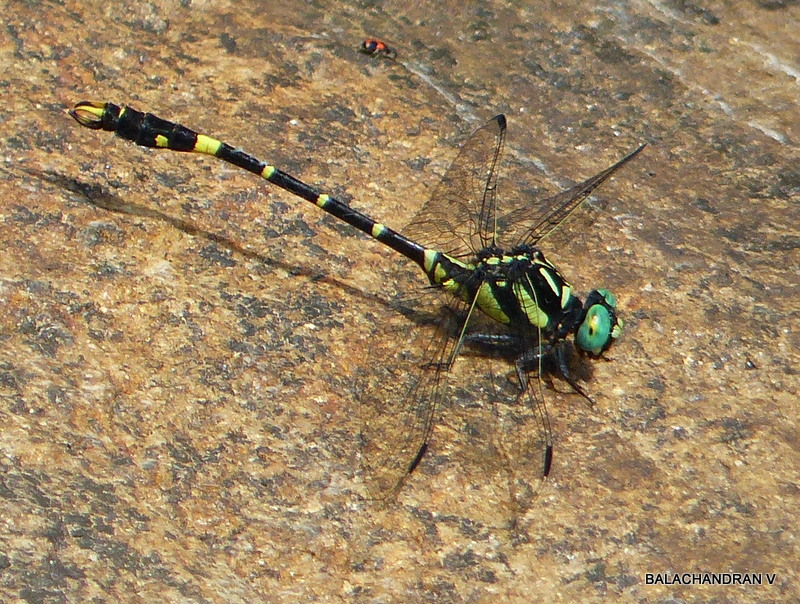

==== Paragomphus lineatus ====
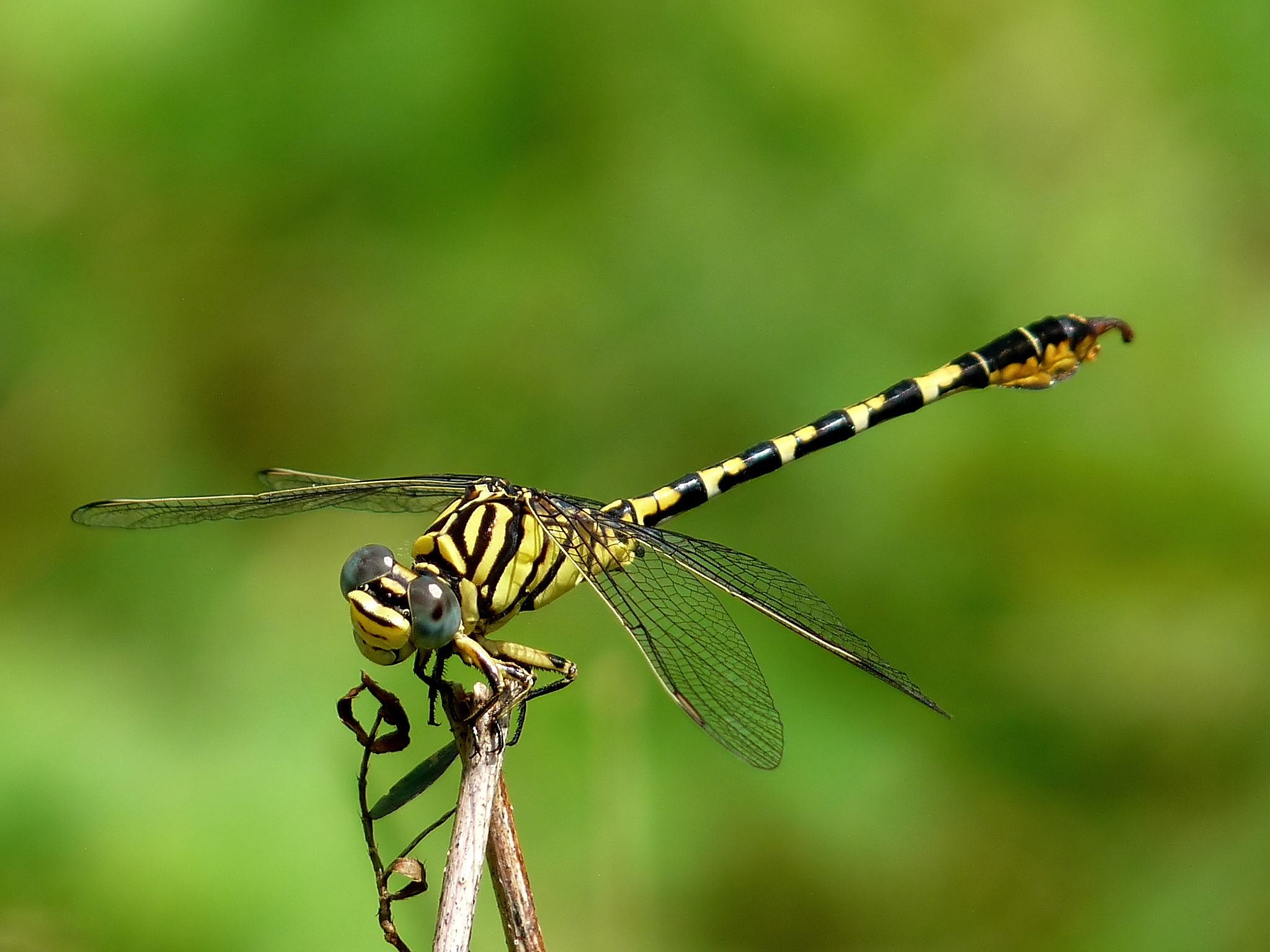
♂

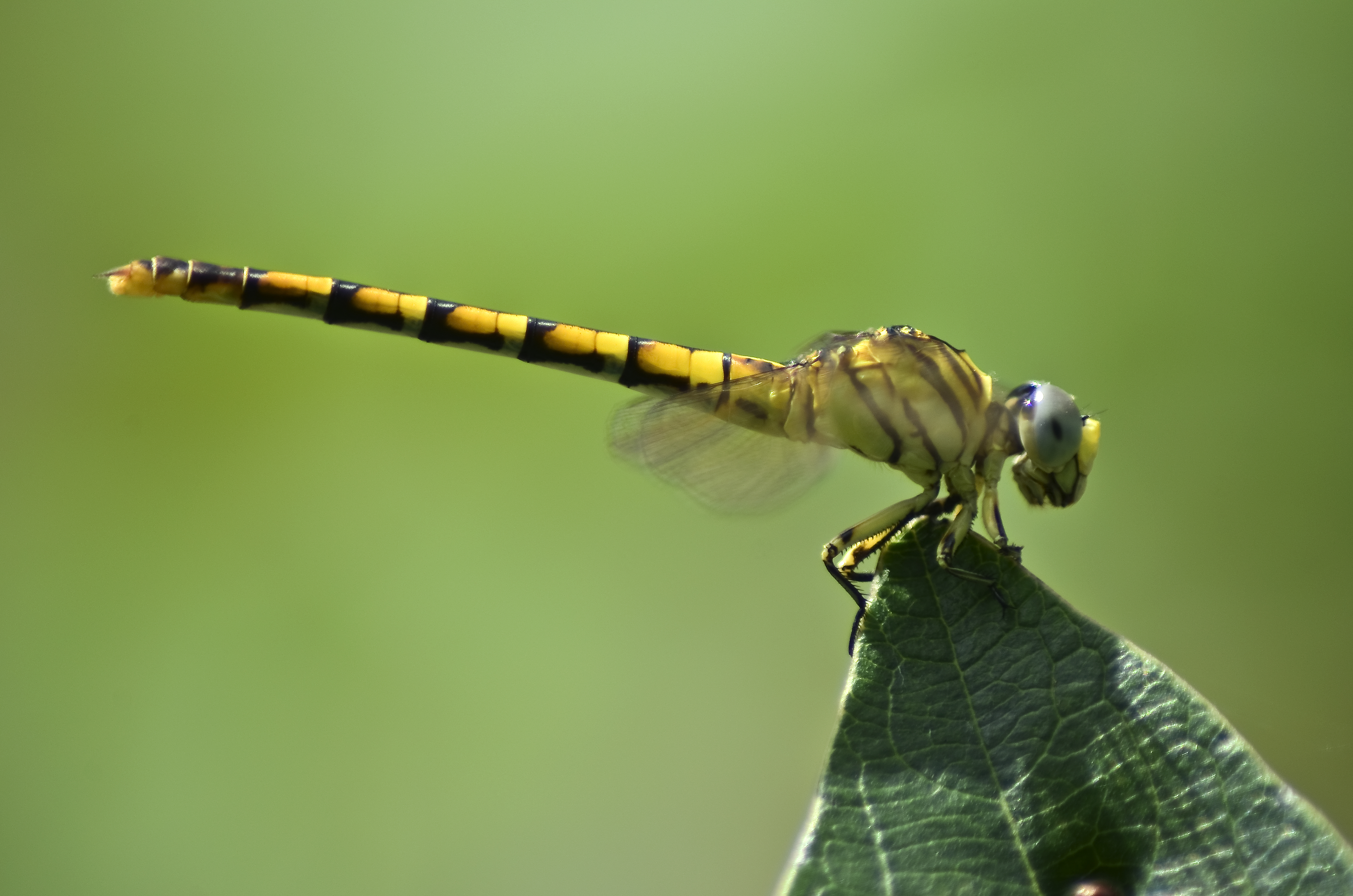
♀

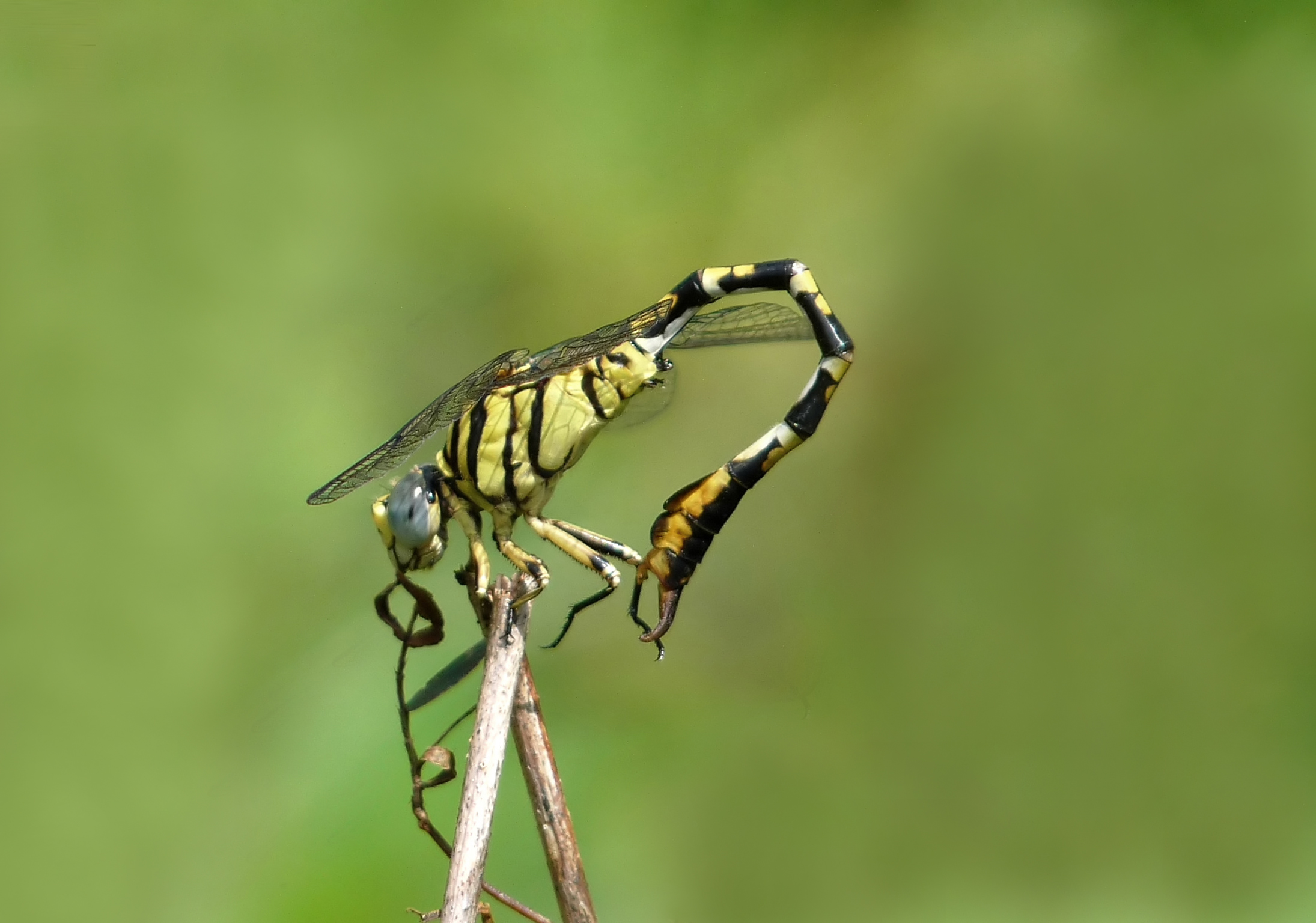
♂

=== Family : Macromiidae ===
==== Epophthalmia vittata ====
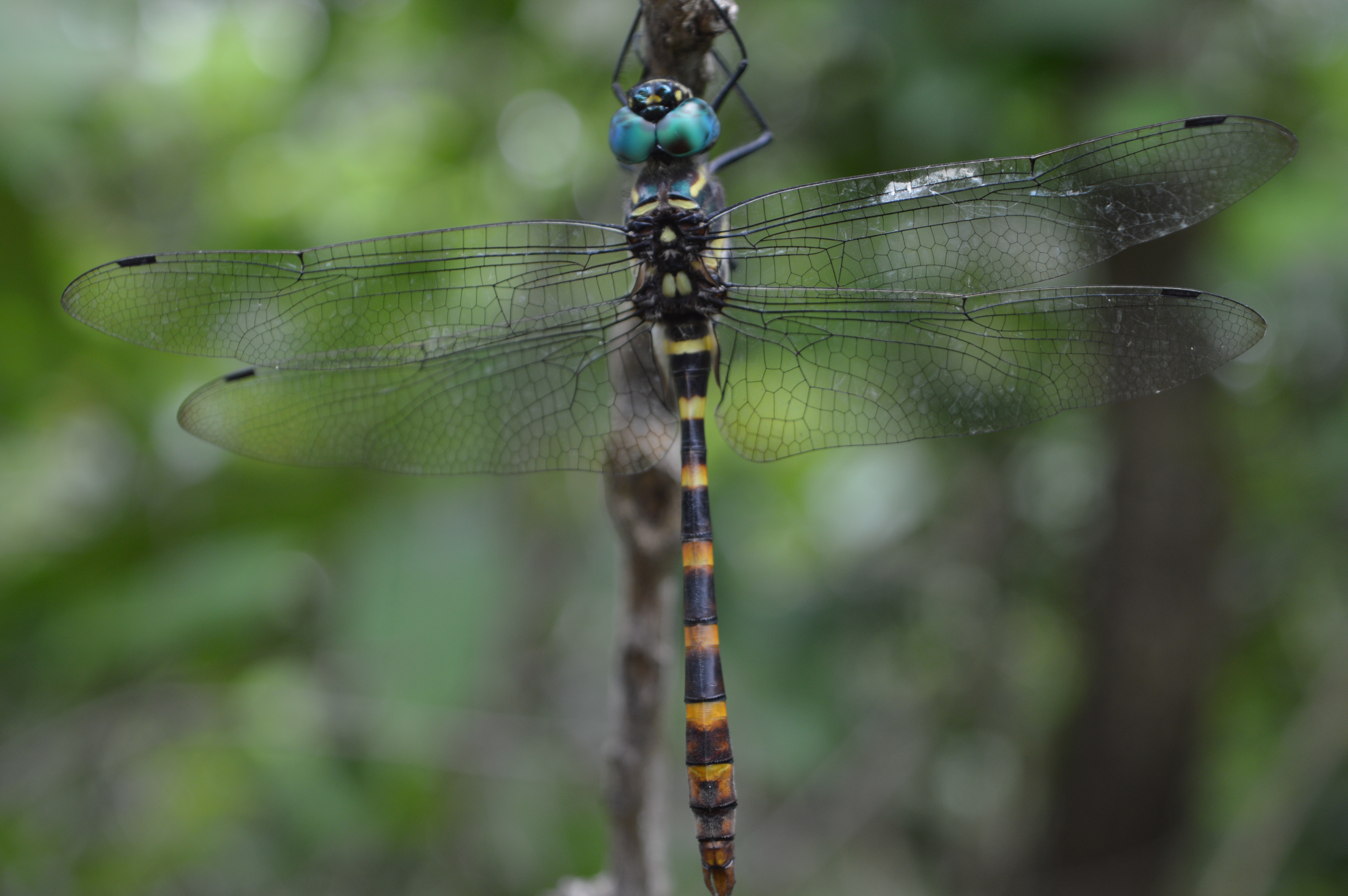

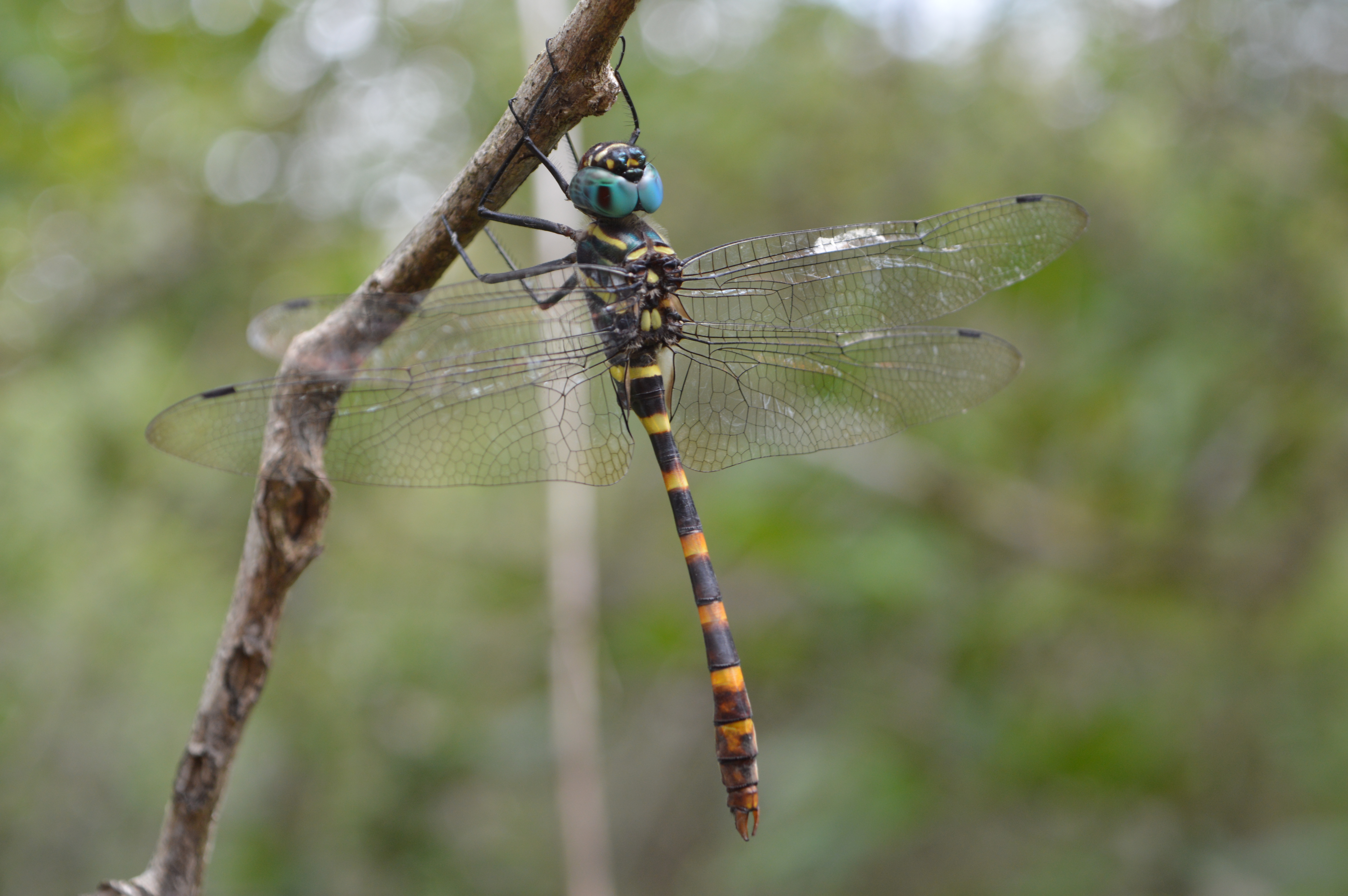

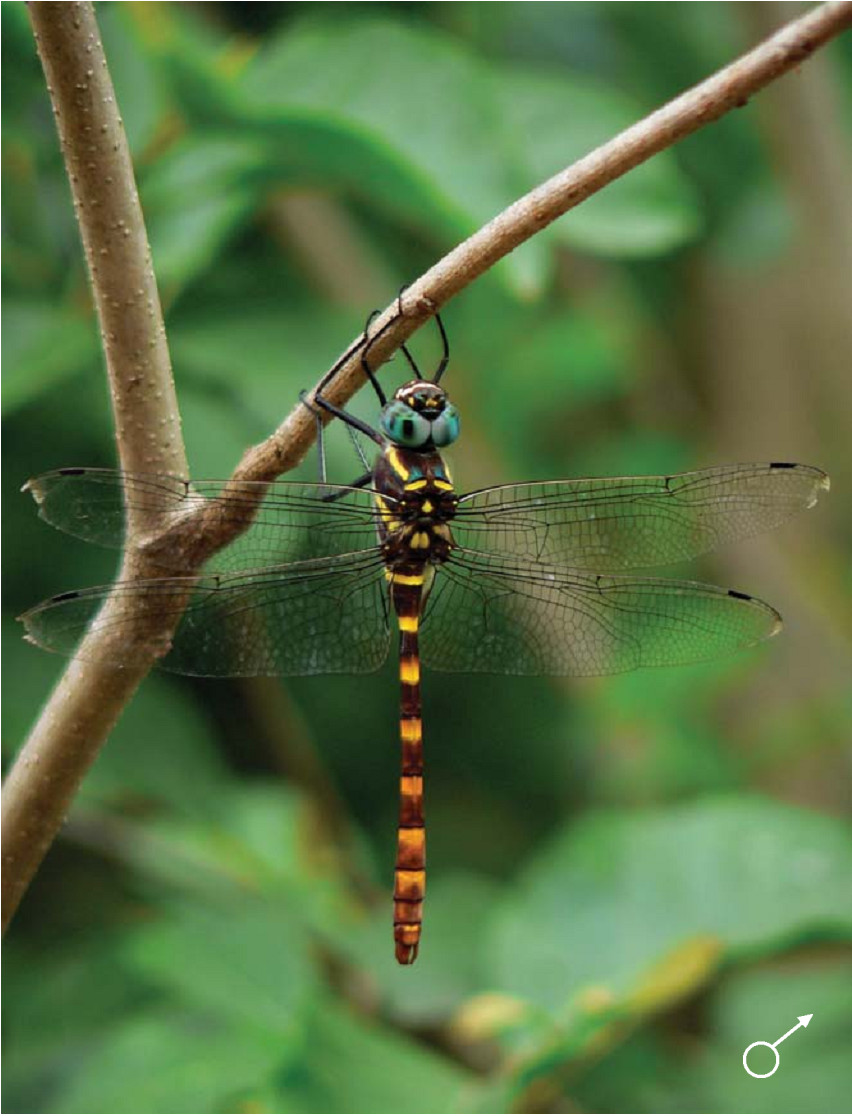

=== Family : Libellulidae ===
==== Acisoma panorpoides ====
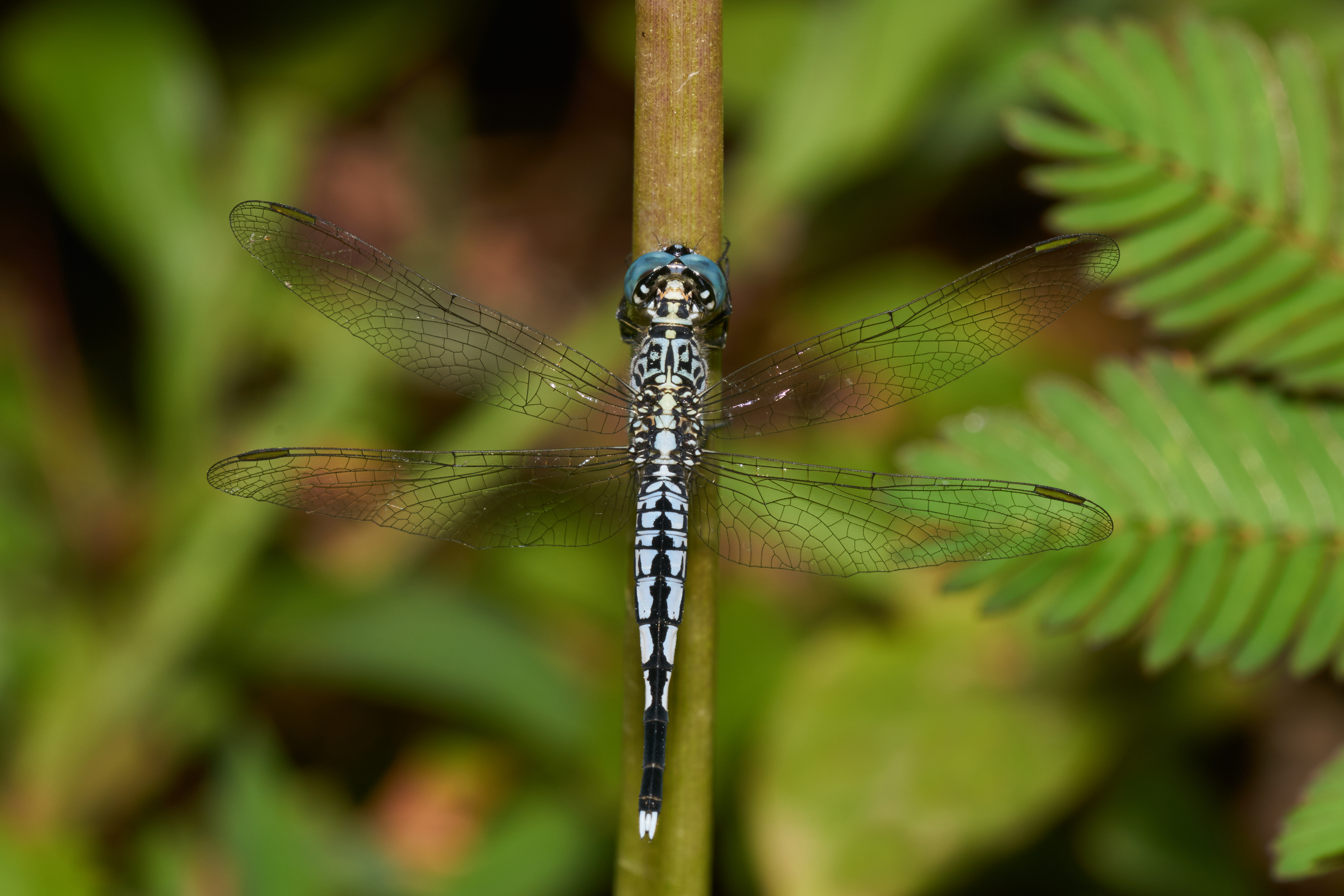
♂

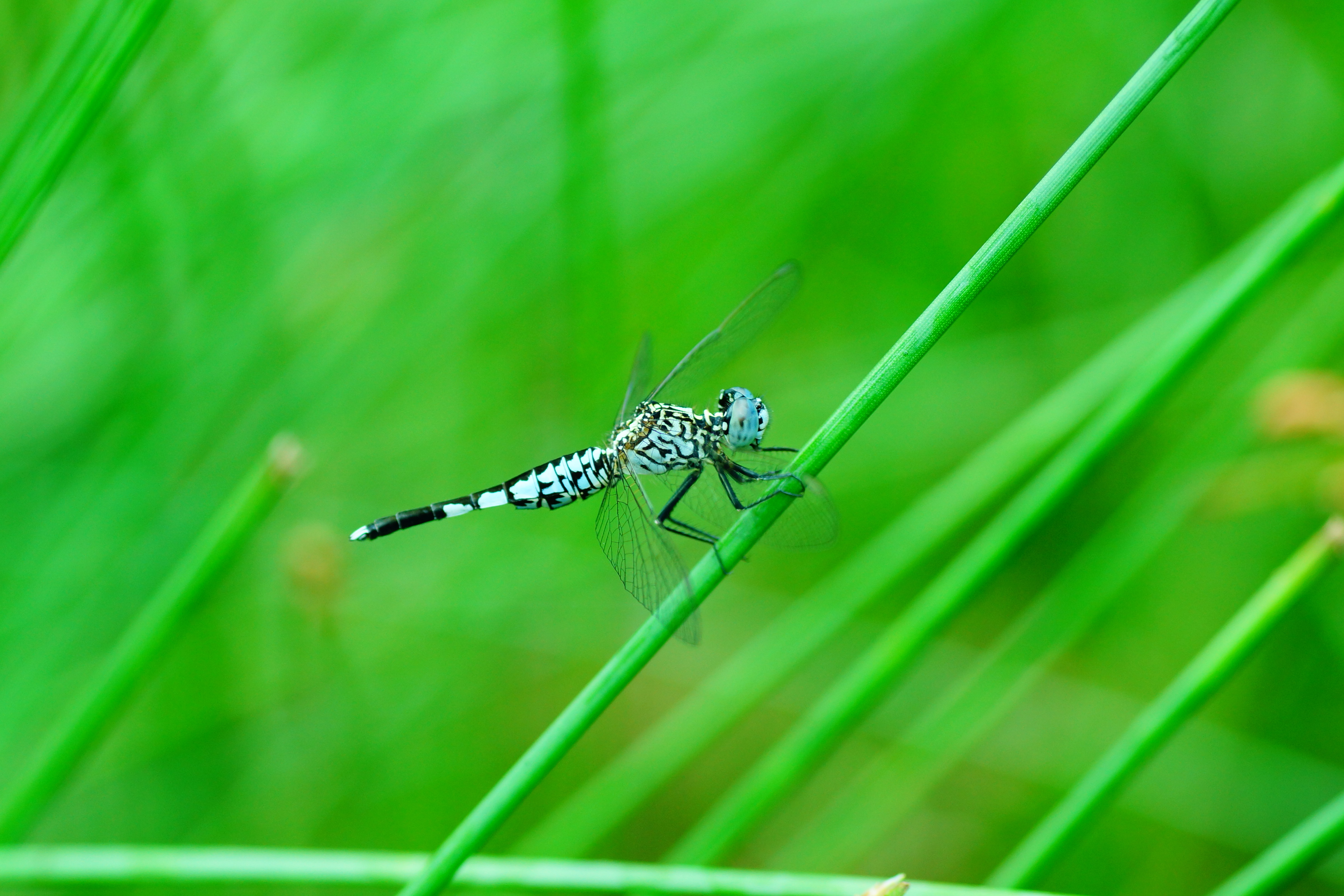
♂

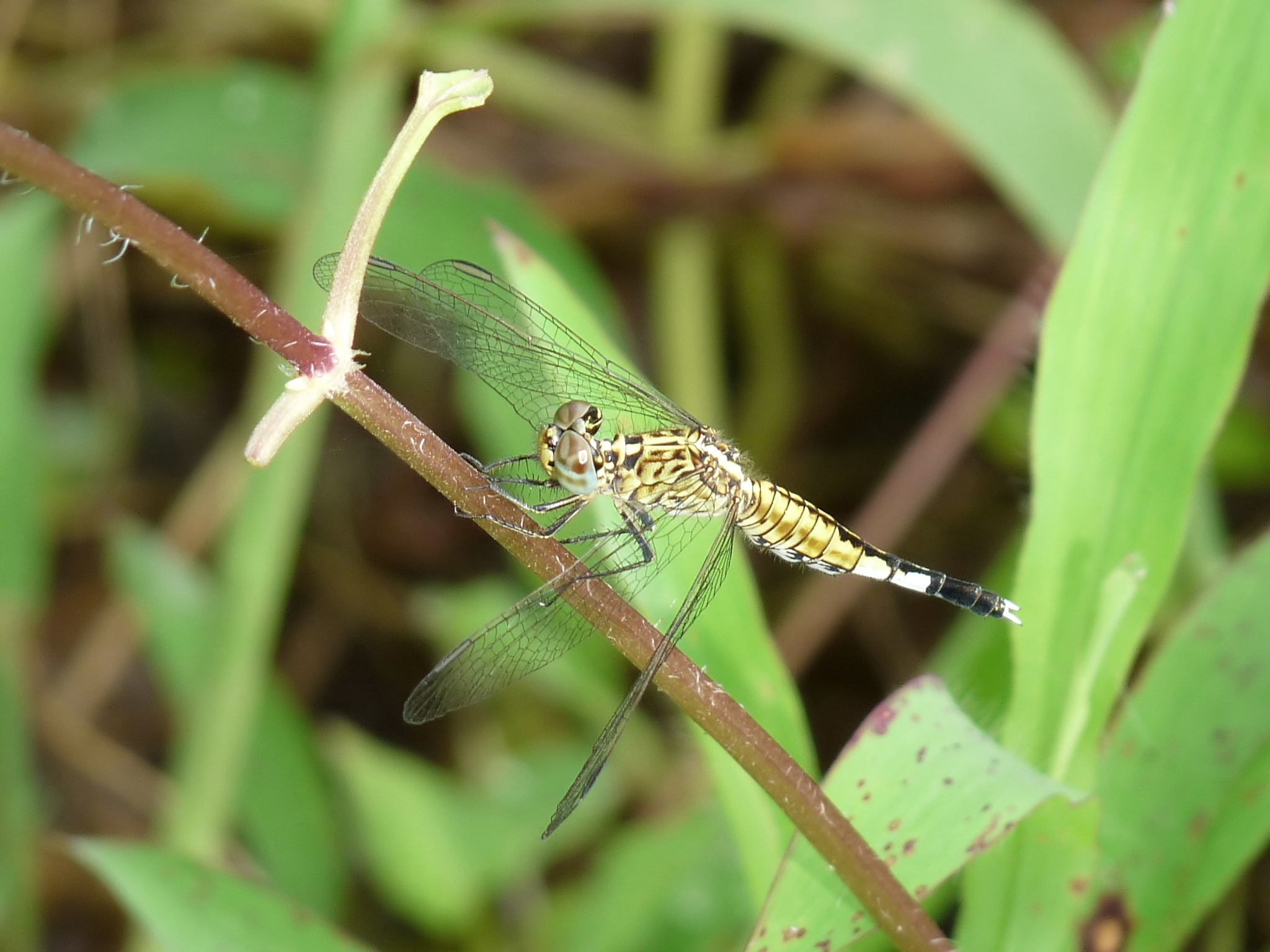
♀

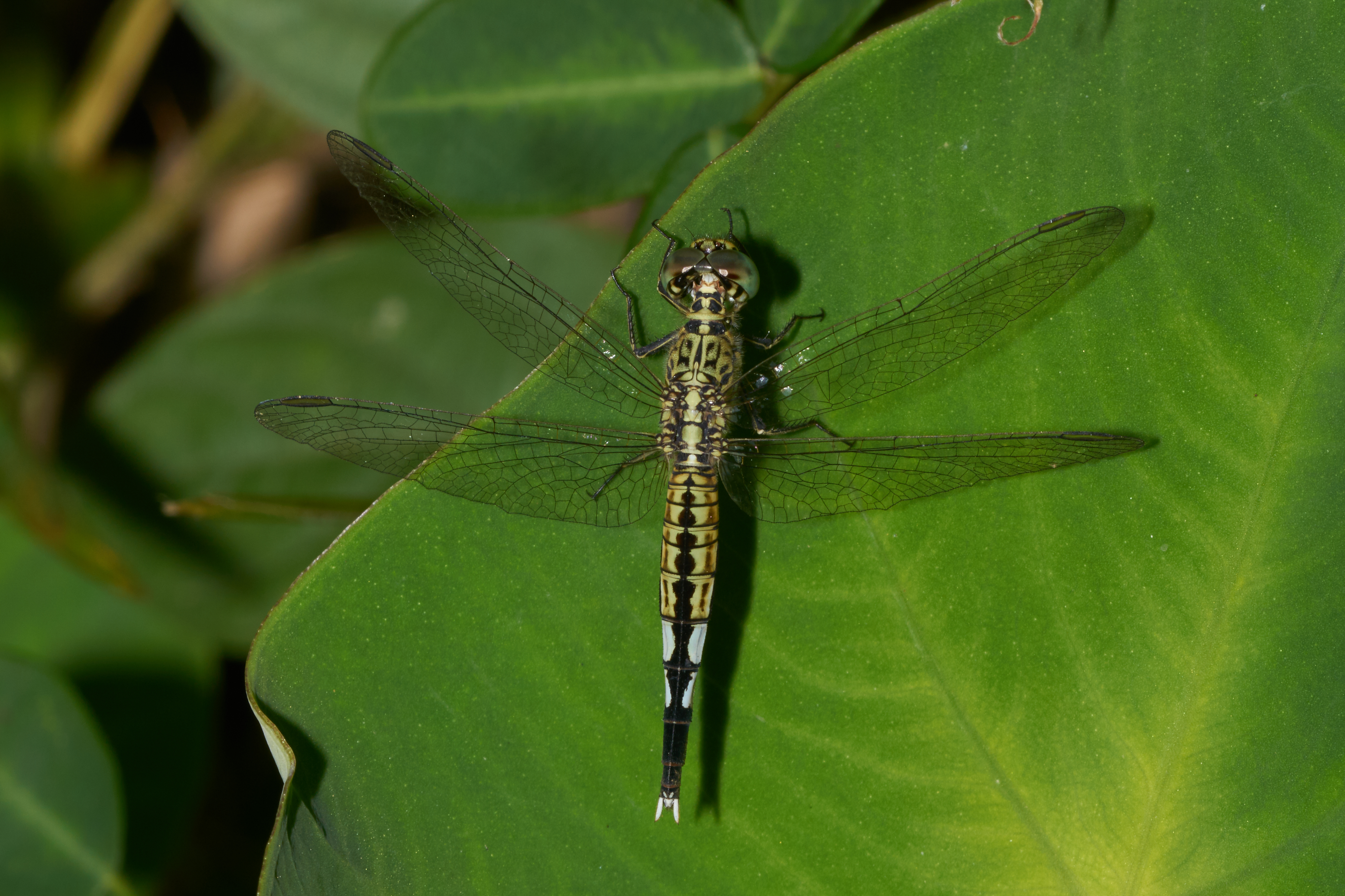
♀

==== Brachydiplax sobrina ====
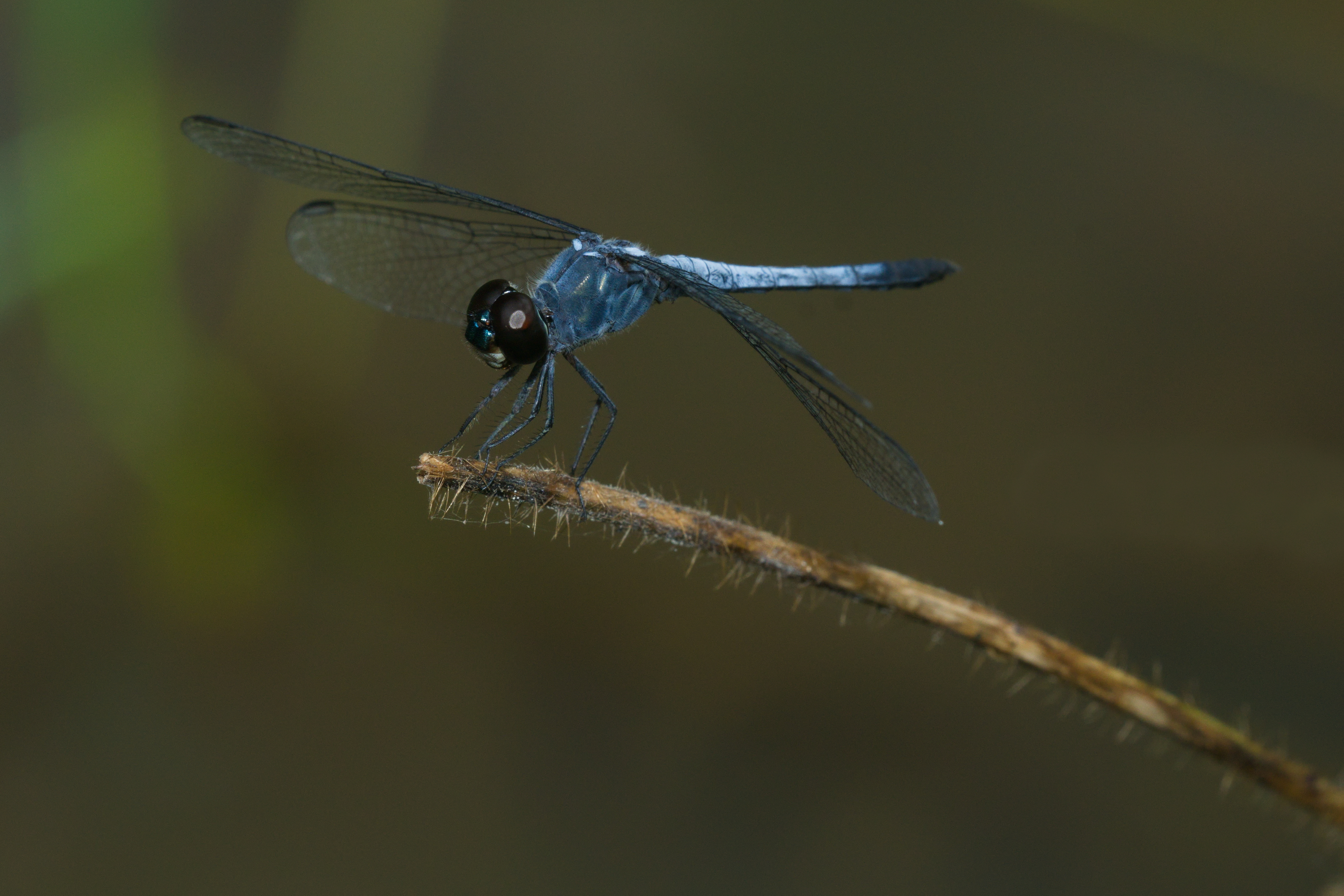
♂

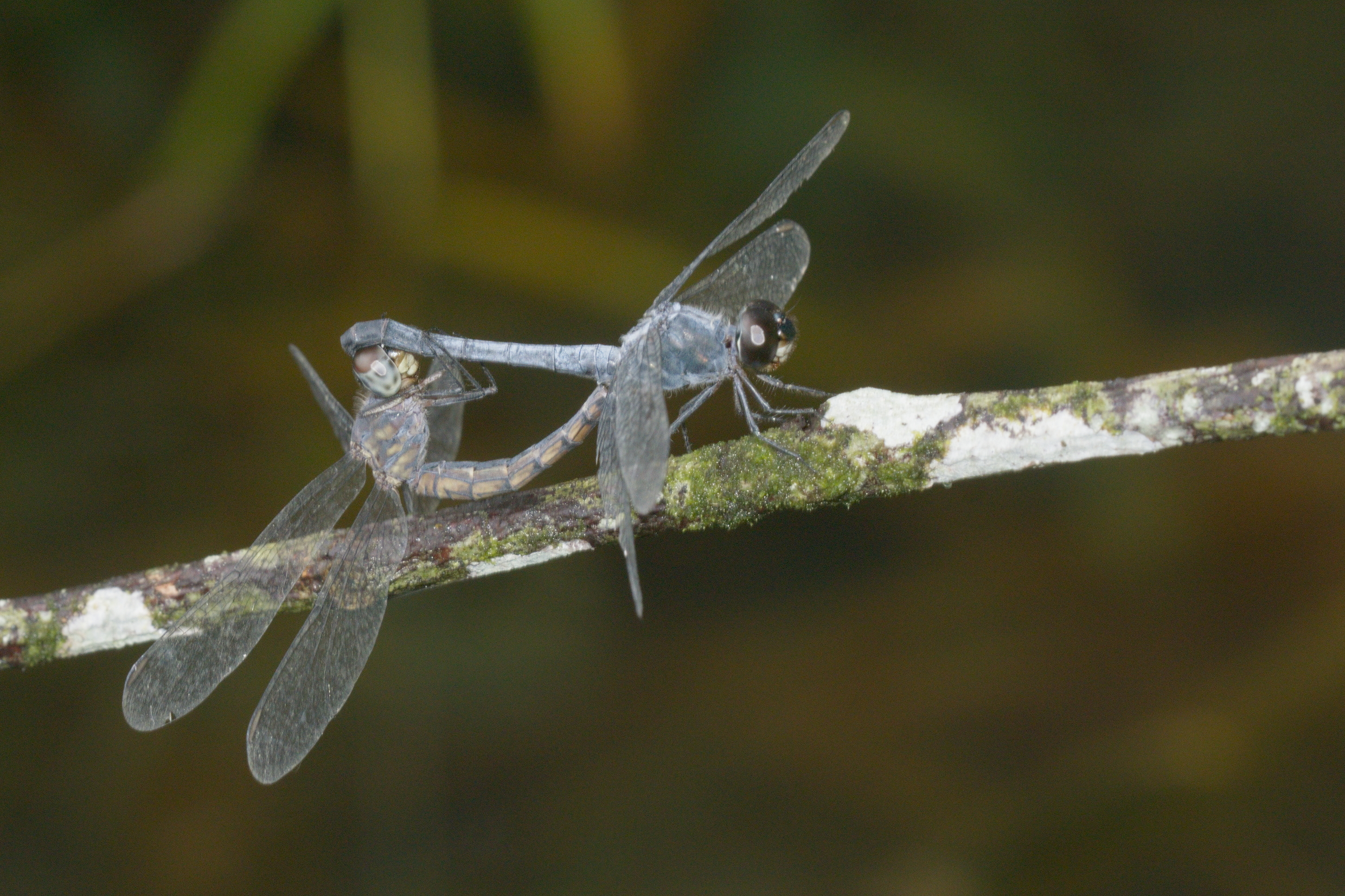
Mating

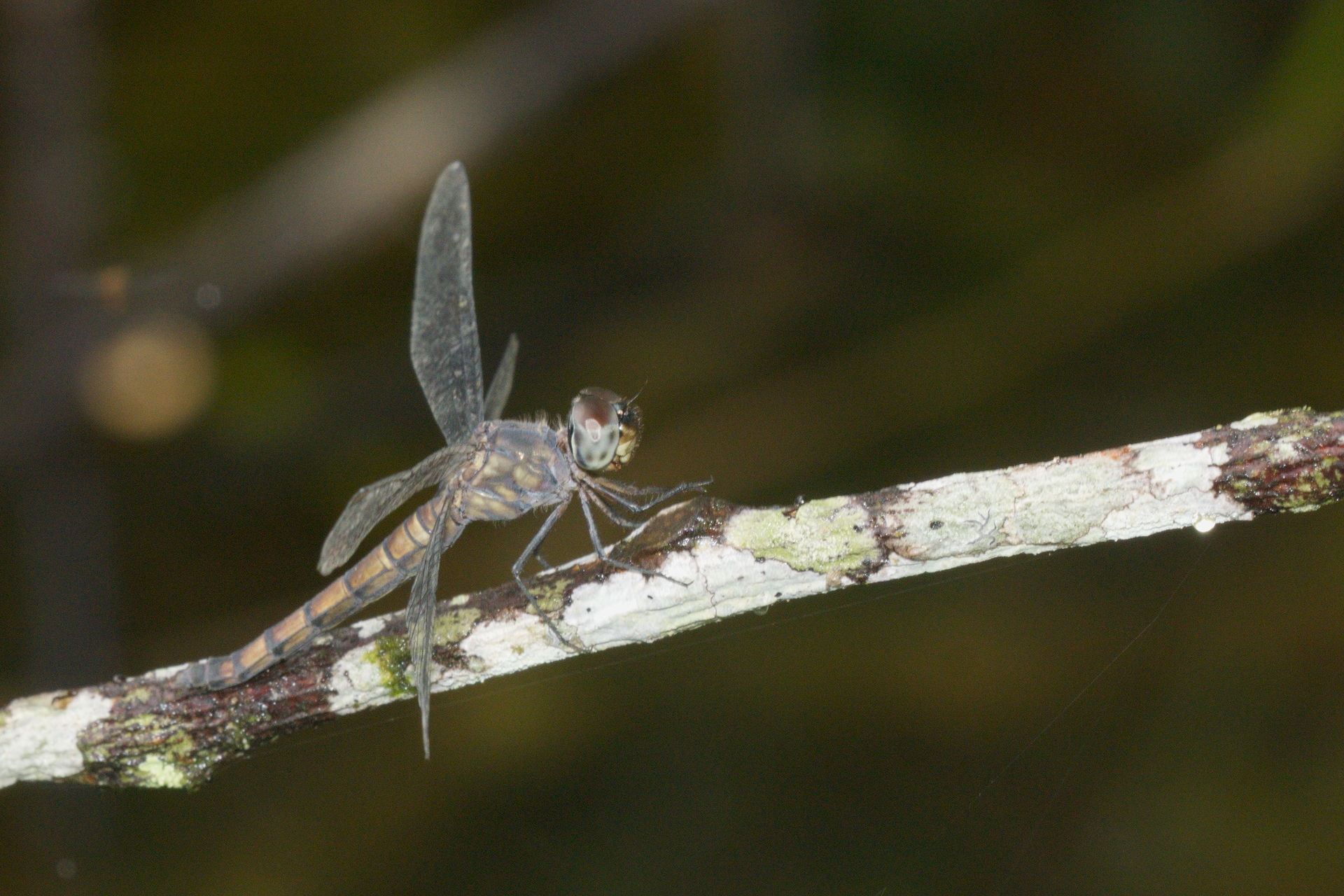
♀

==== Brachythemis contaminata ====
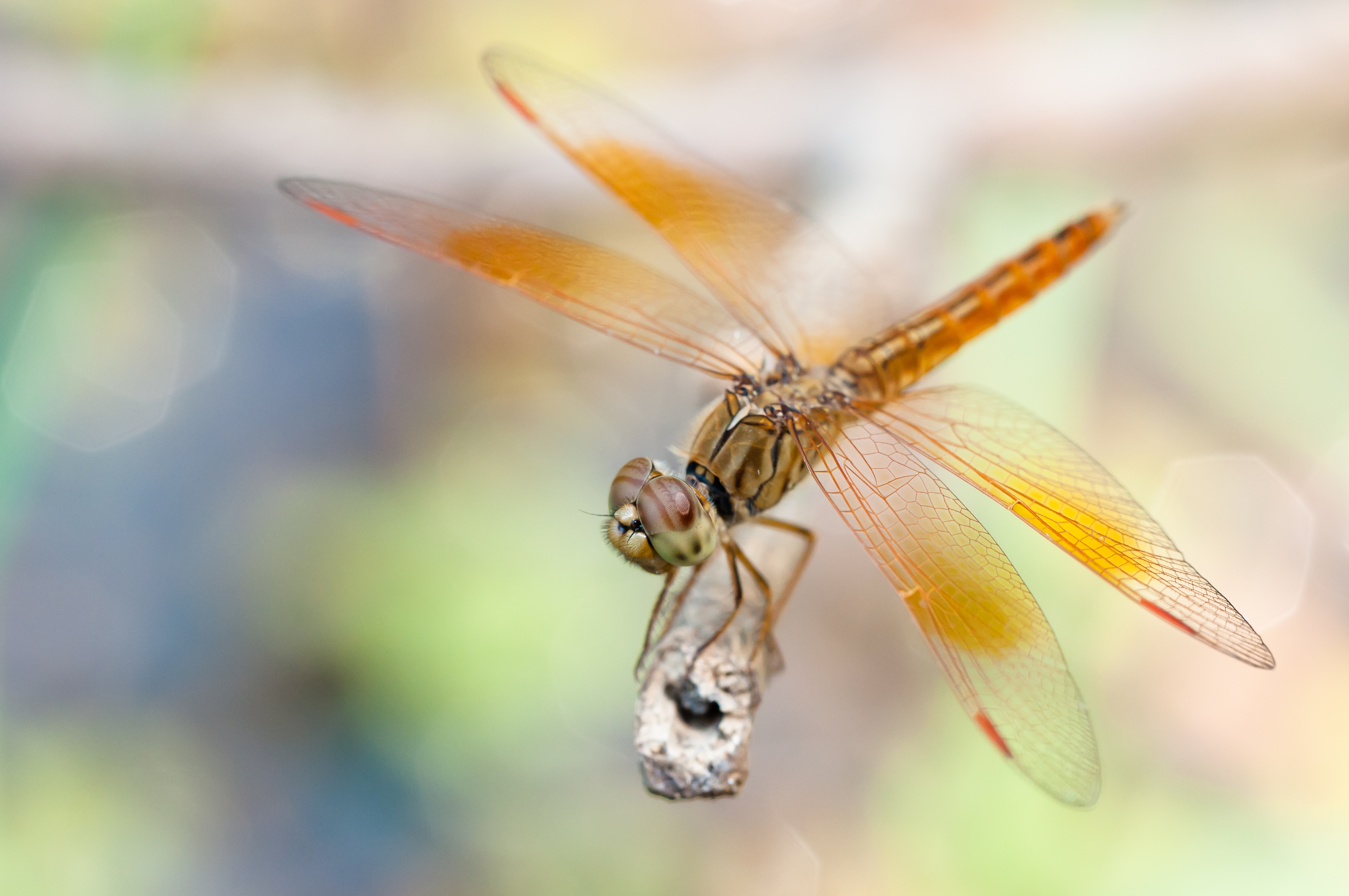
♂

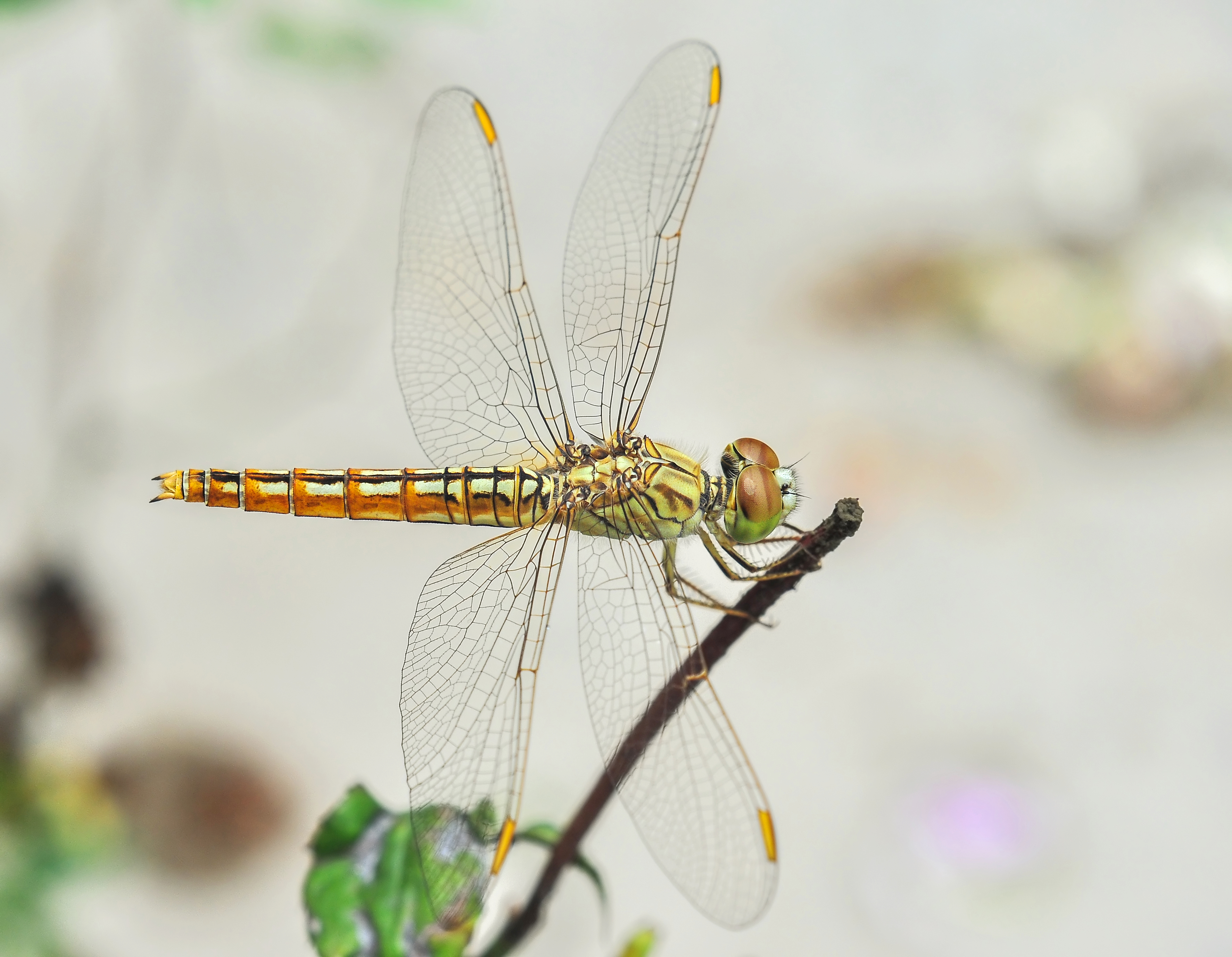
♀

==== Bradinopyga geminata ====
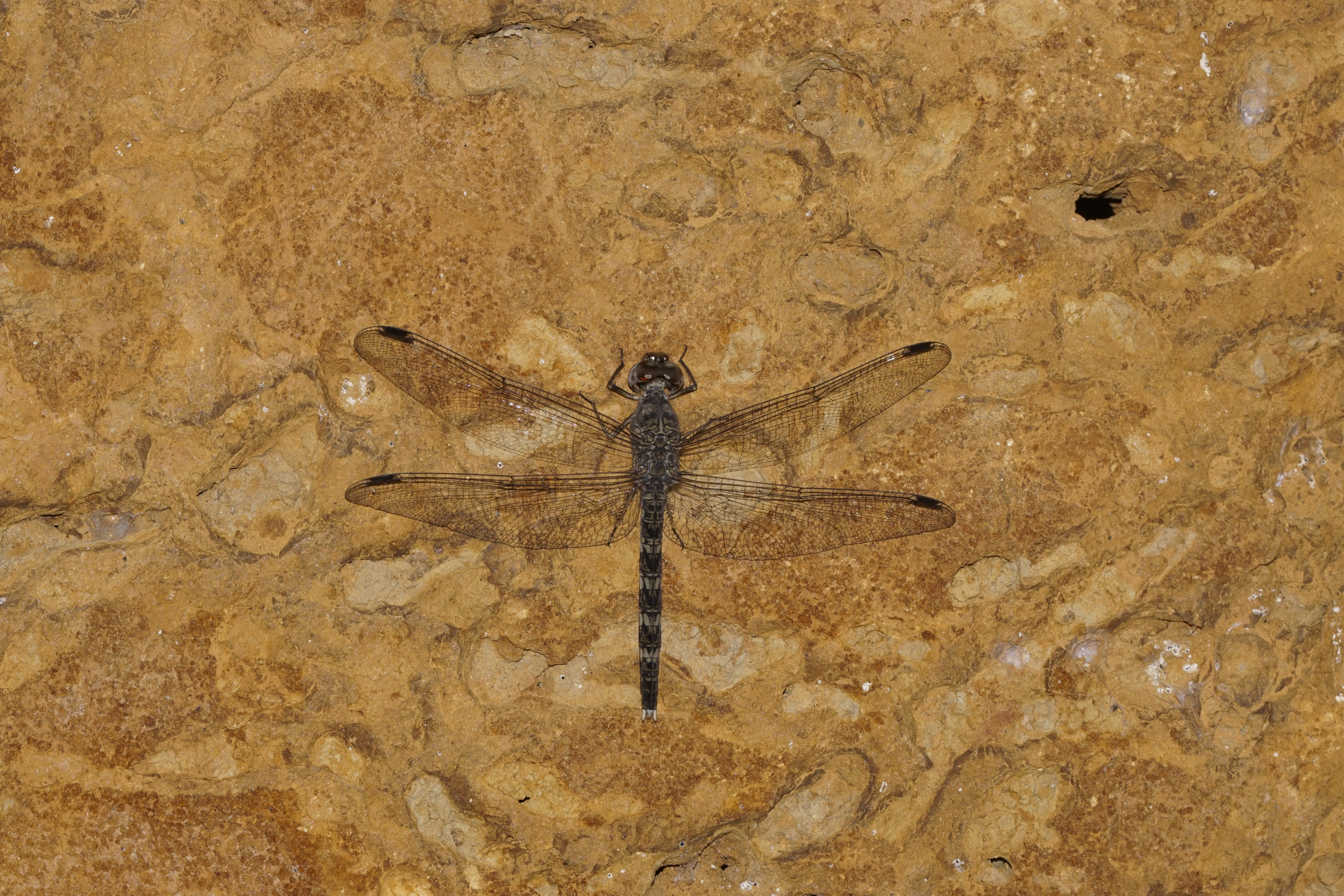

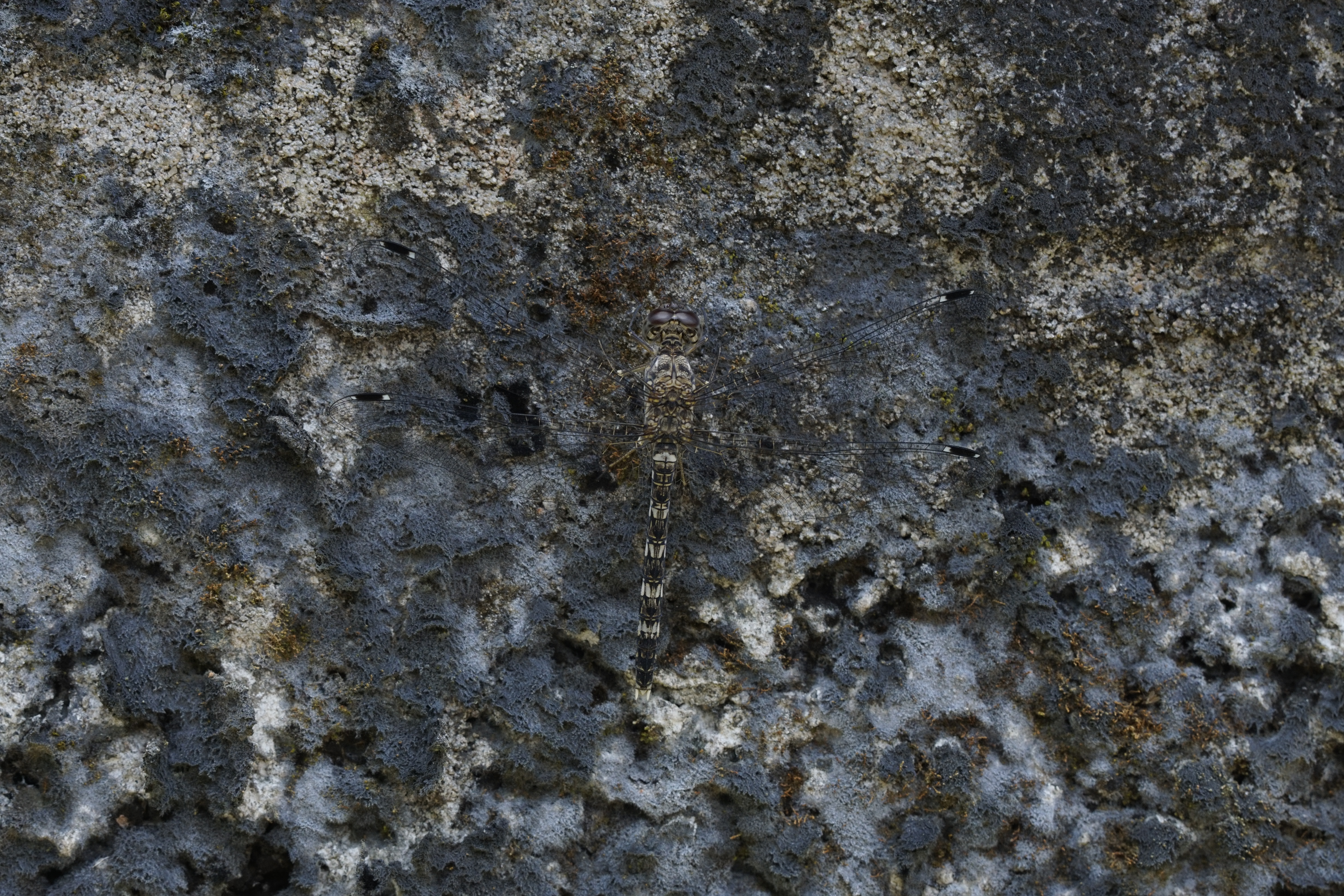

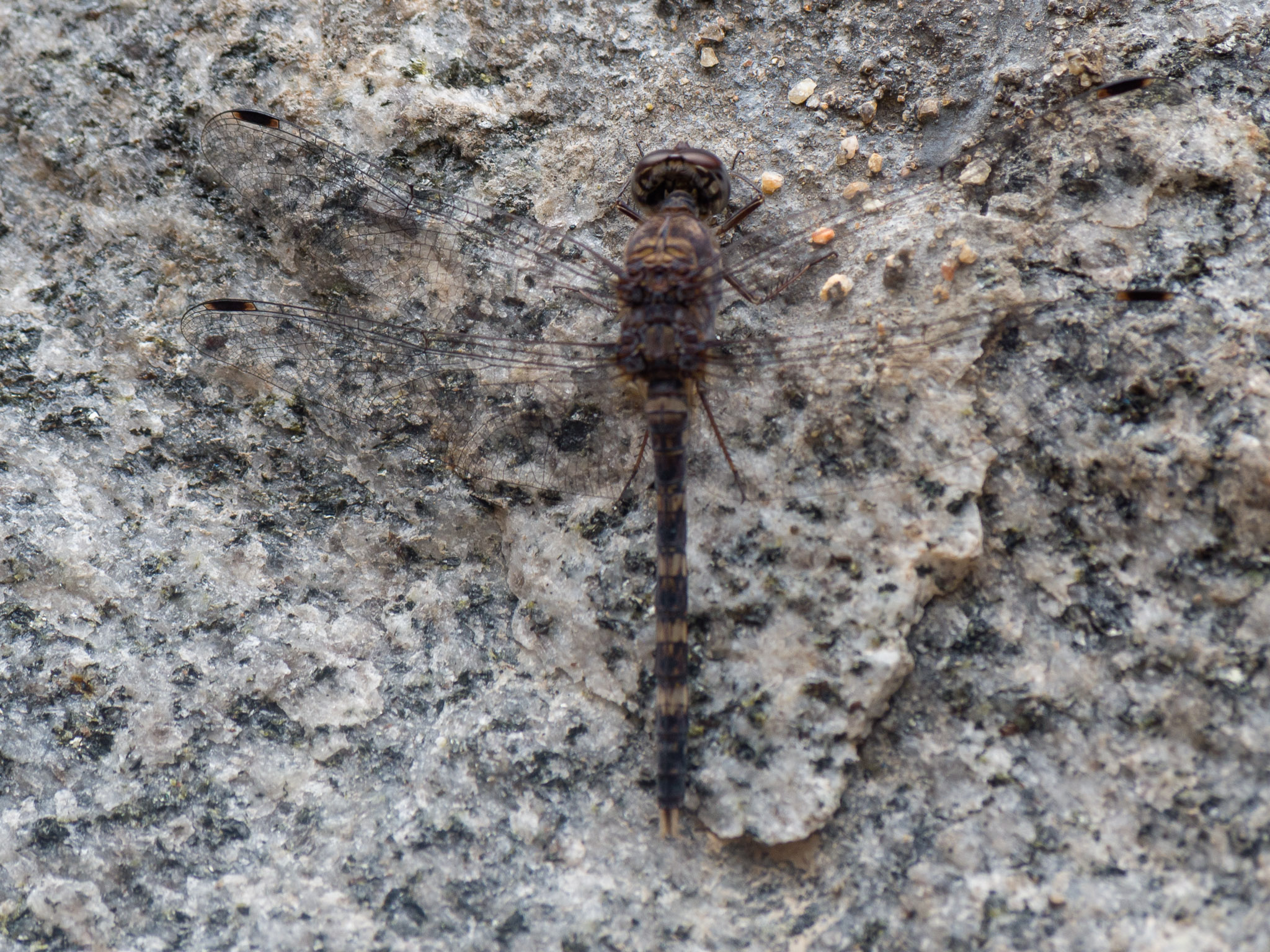

==== Crocothemis servilia ====
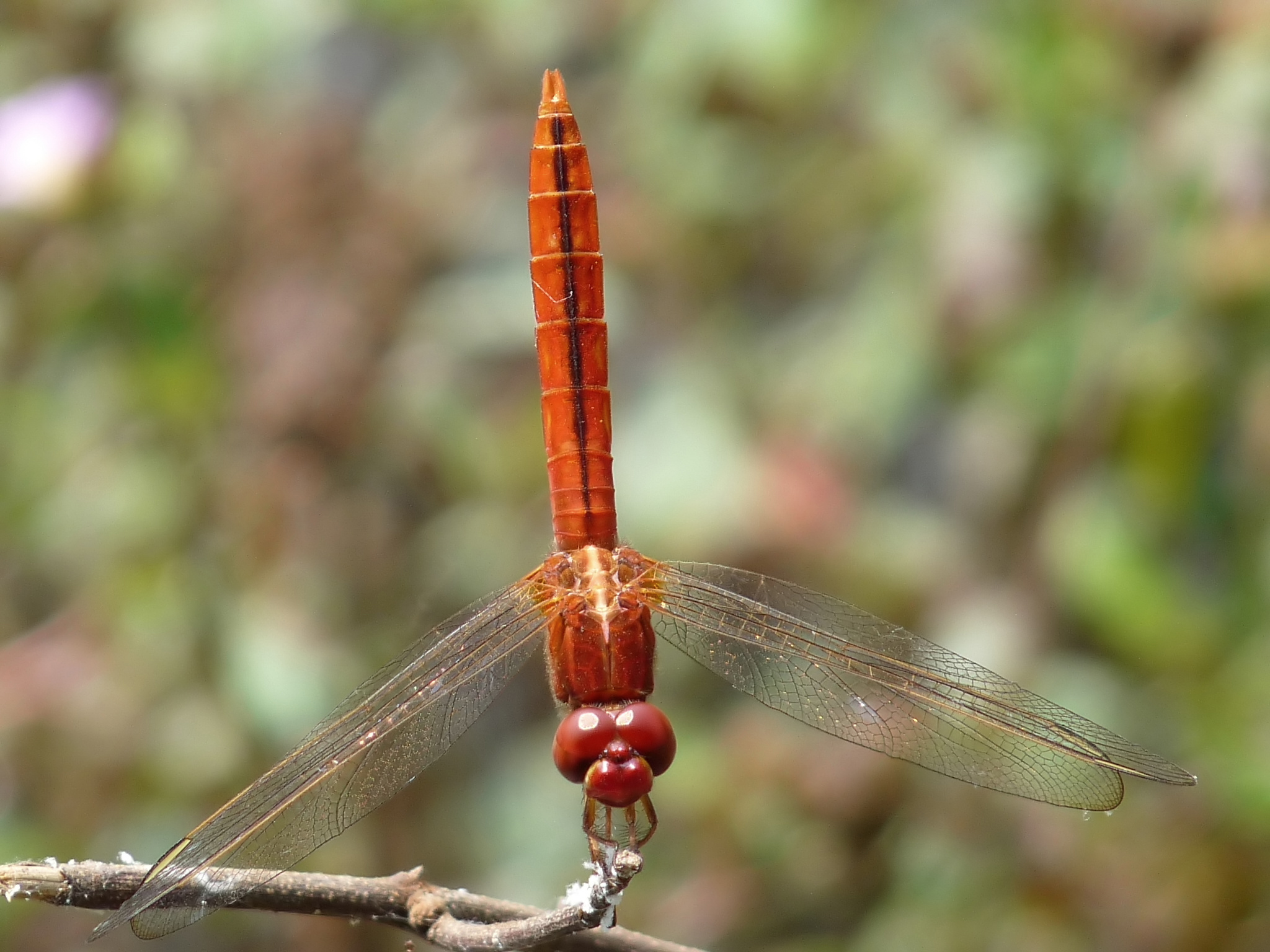
♂

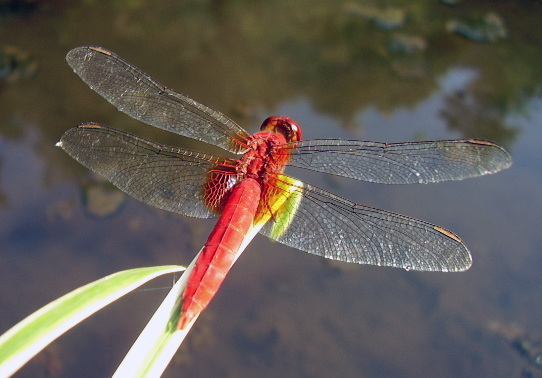
♂

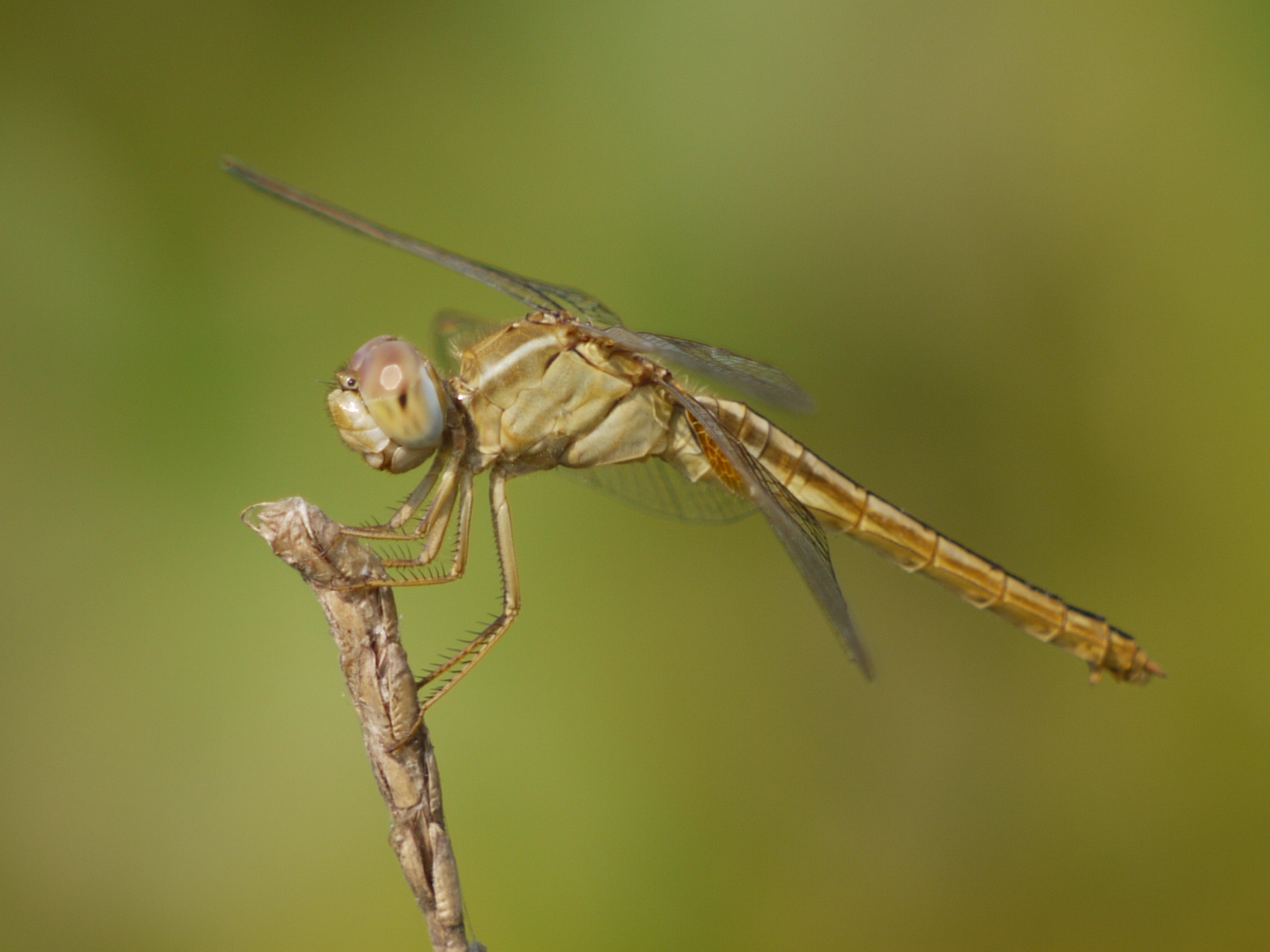
♀

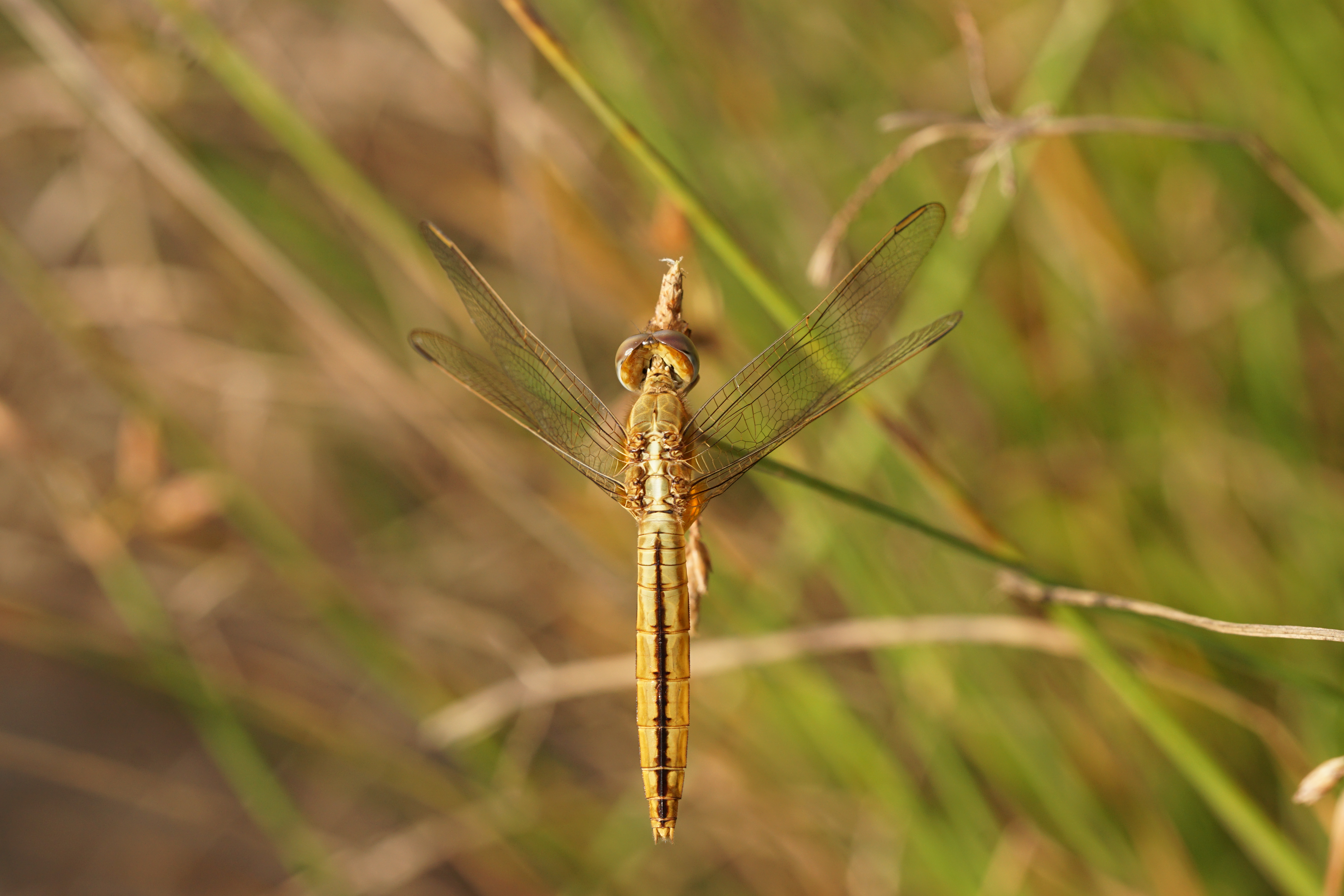
♀

==== Hylaeothemis indica ====
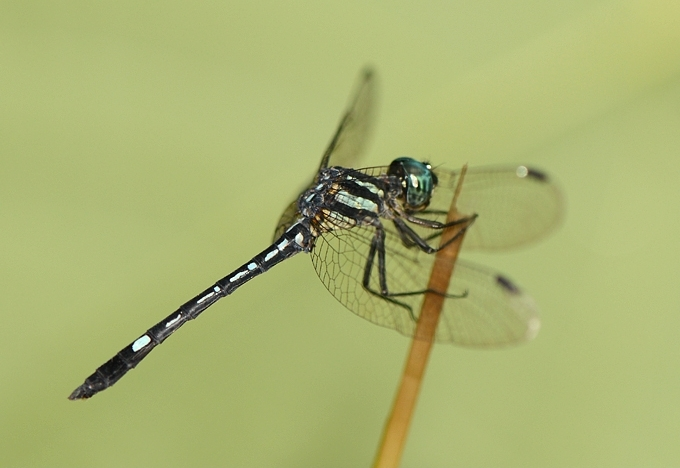
♂

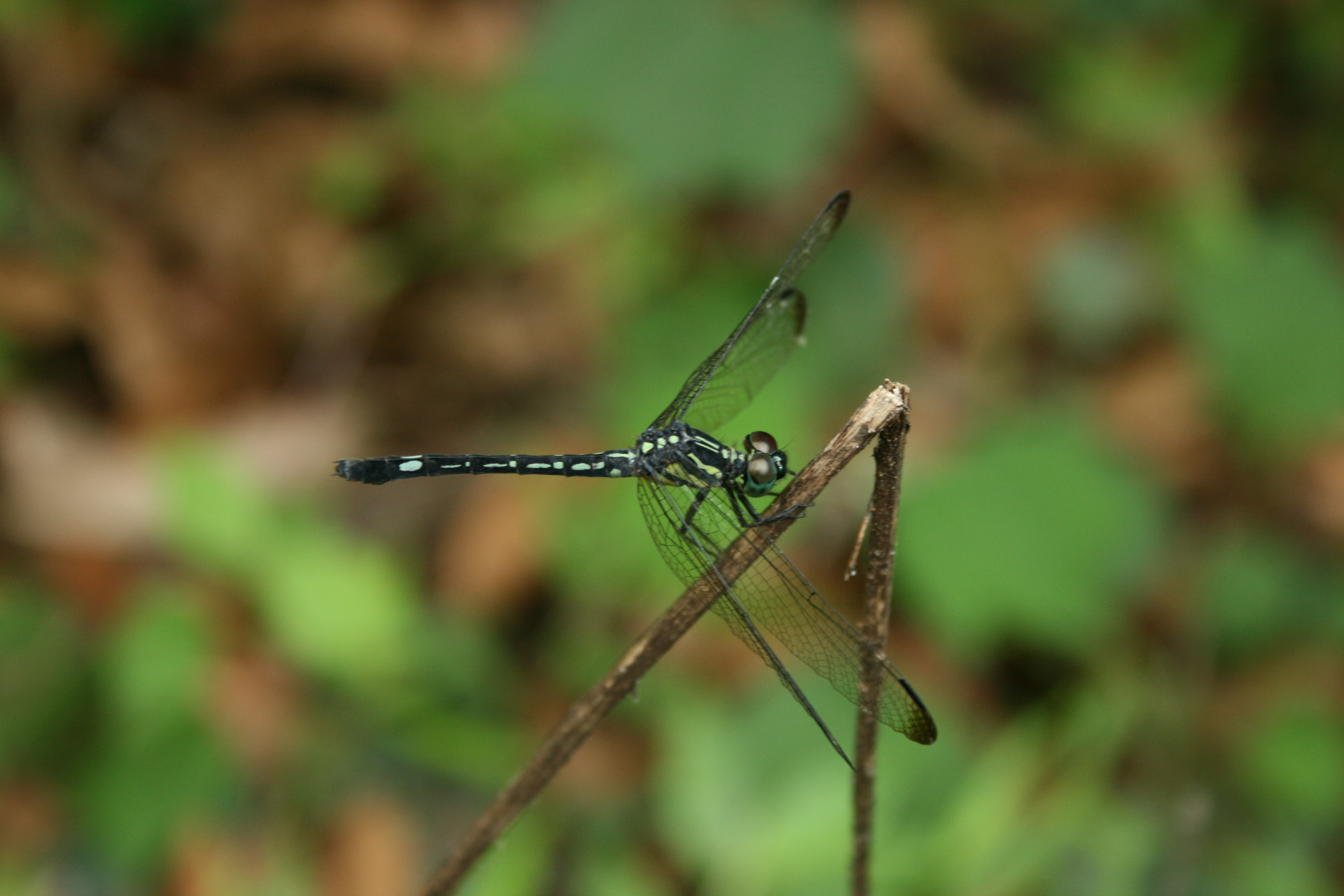
♂

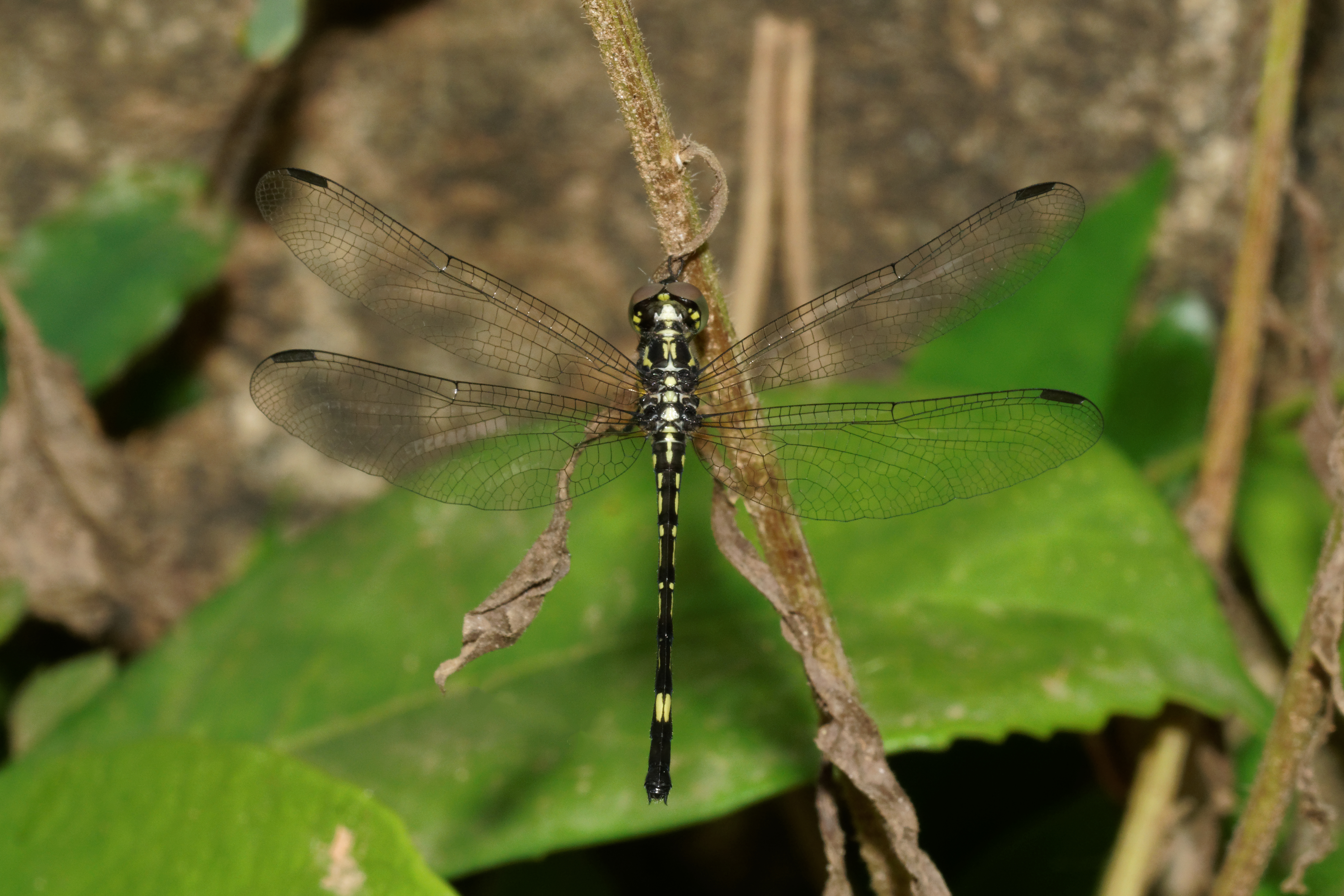
♀

==== Rhyothemis variegata ====
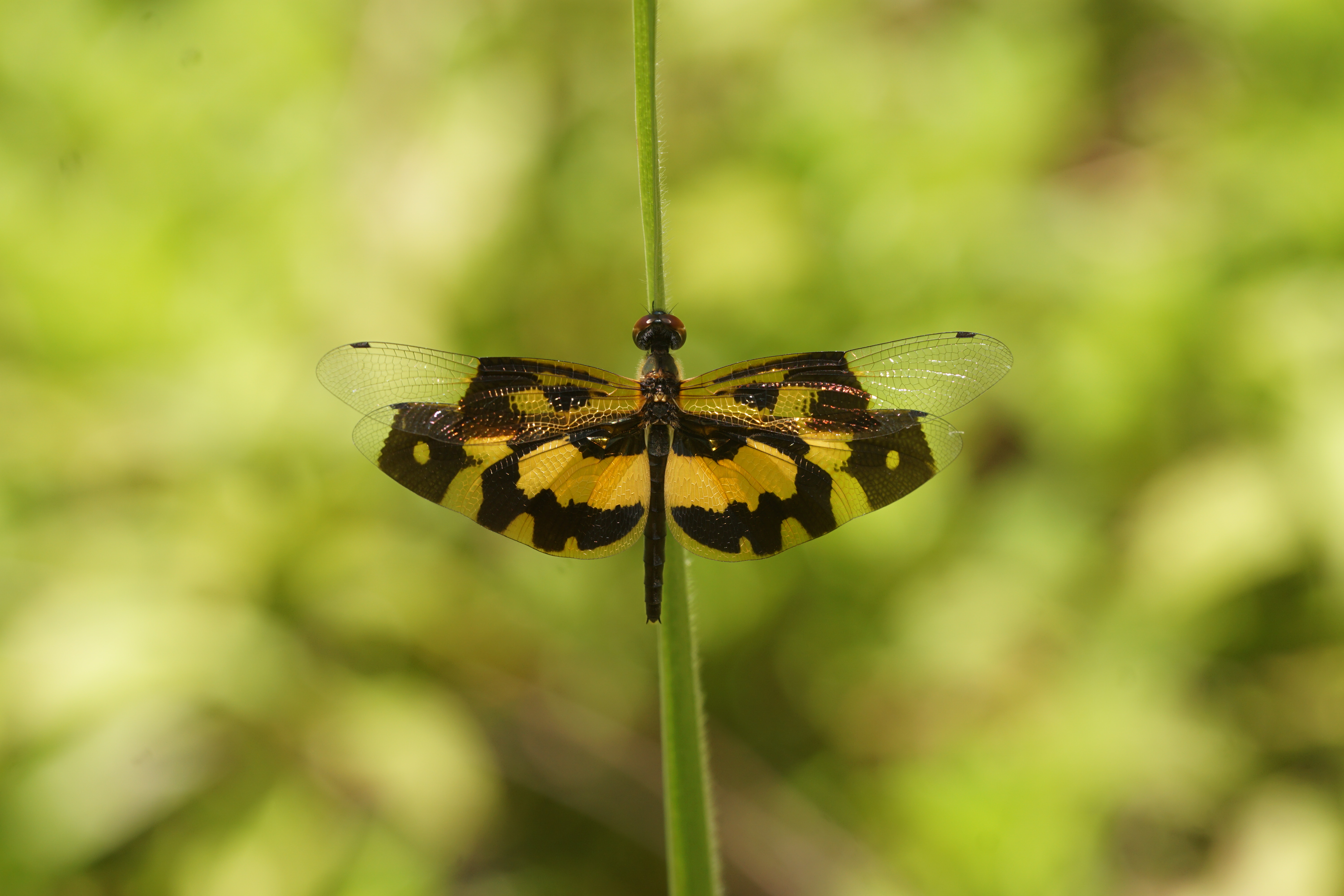
♀

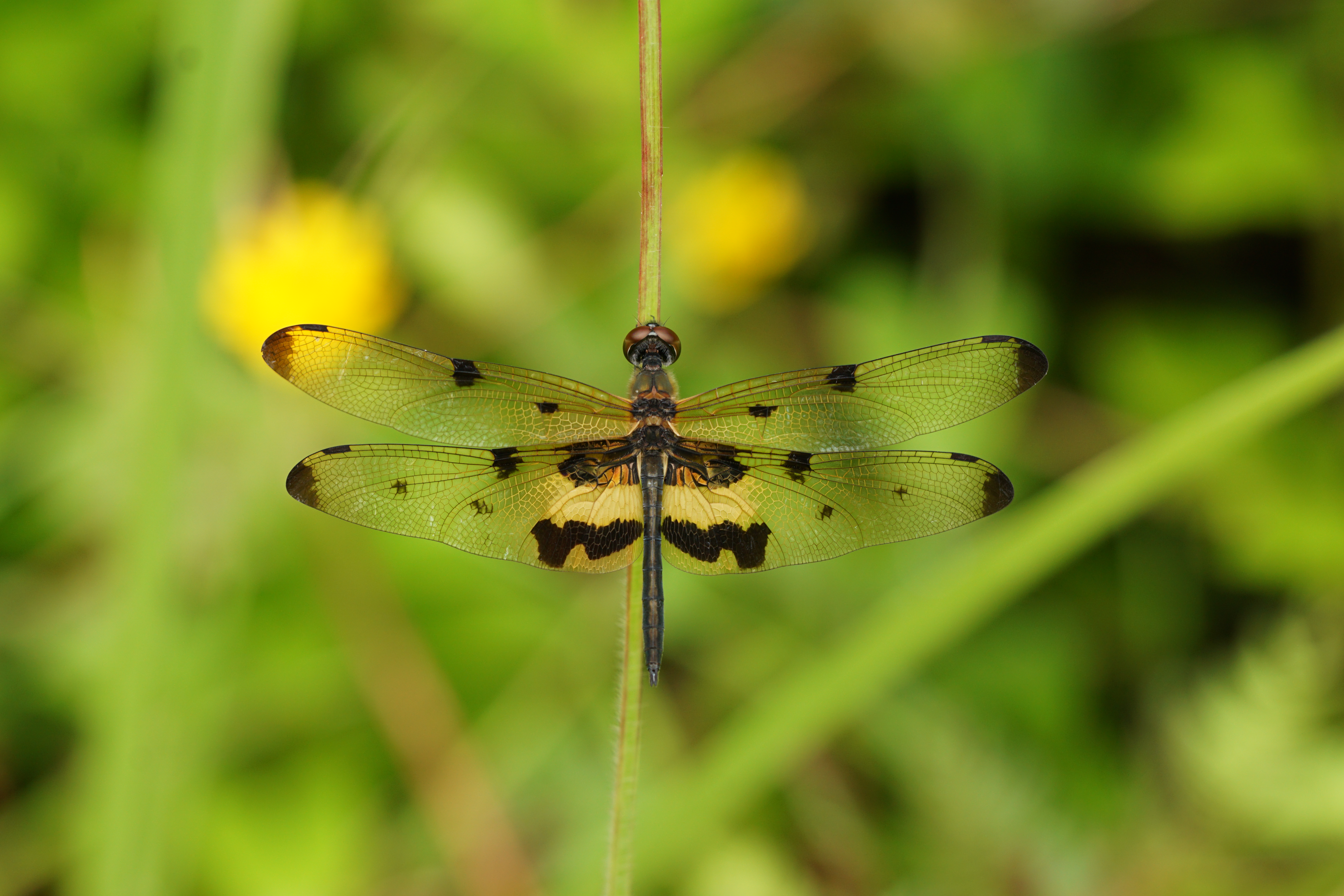
♂

==== Tramea limbata ====
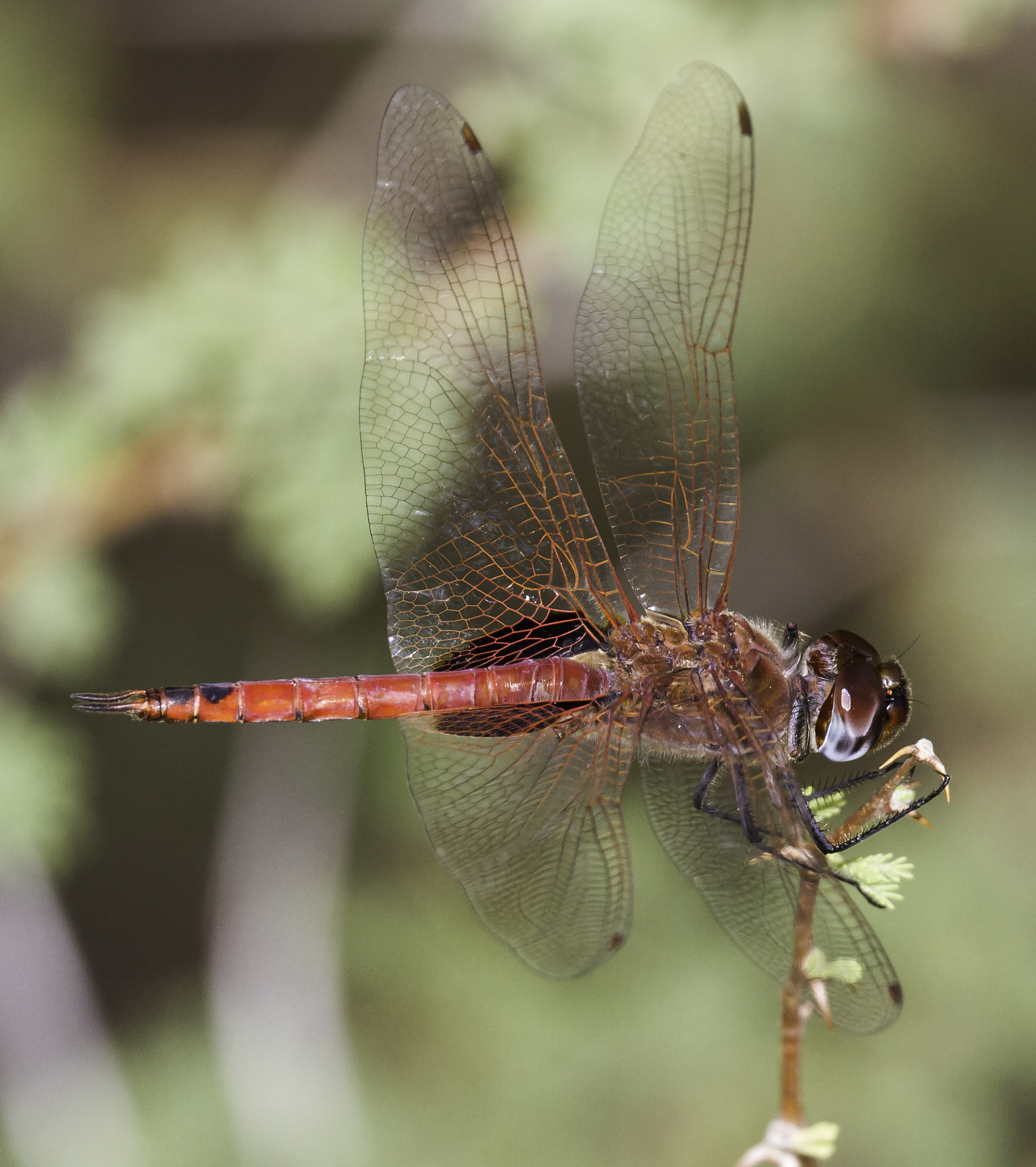

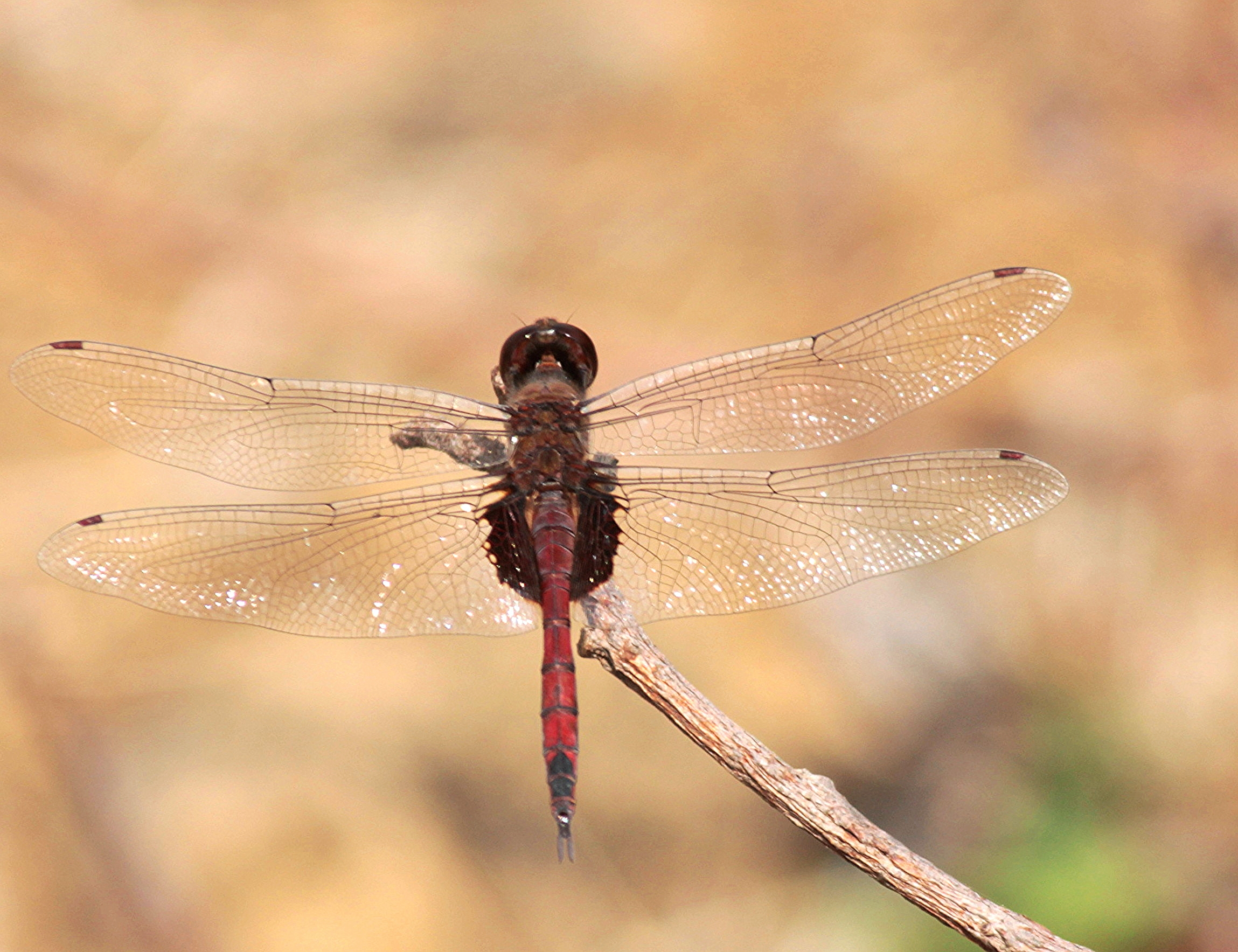

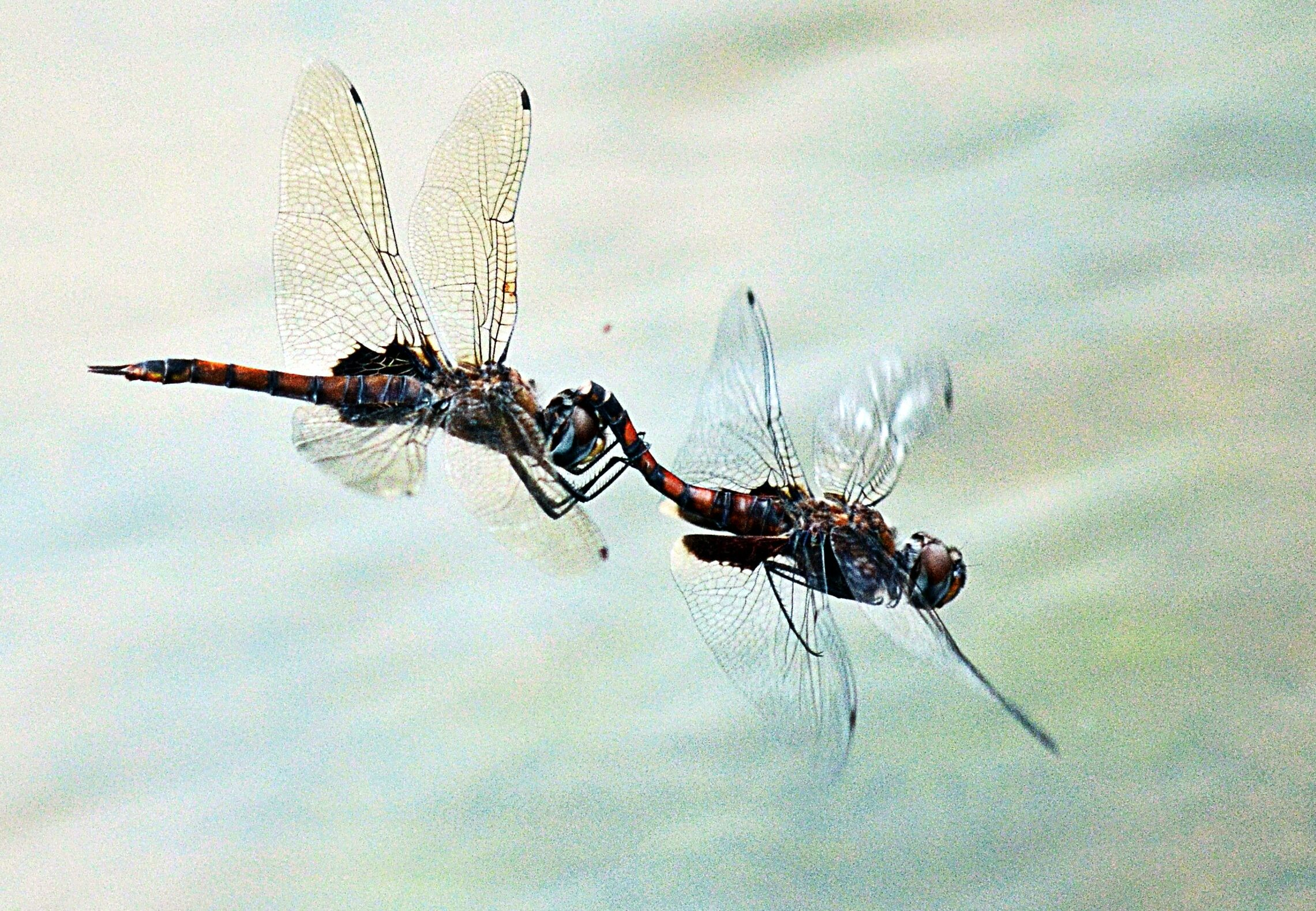

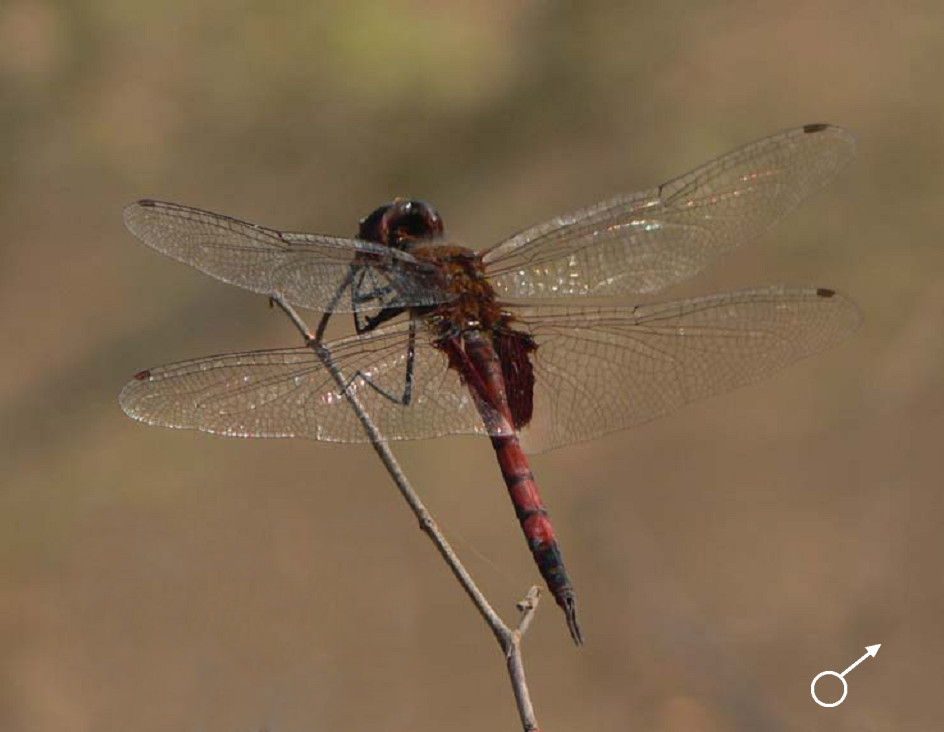

==== Trithemis kirbyi ====
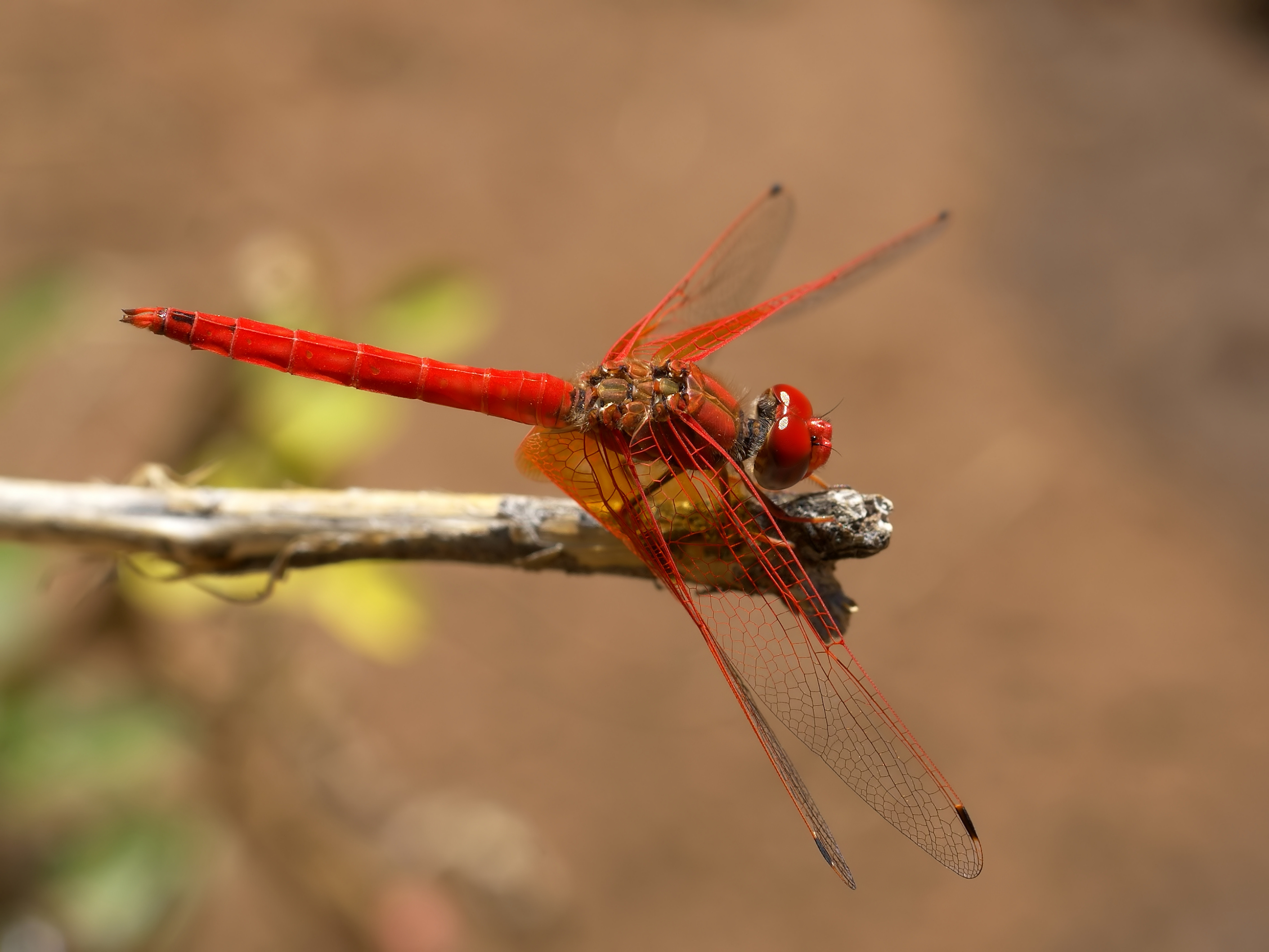
♂

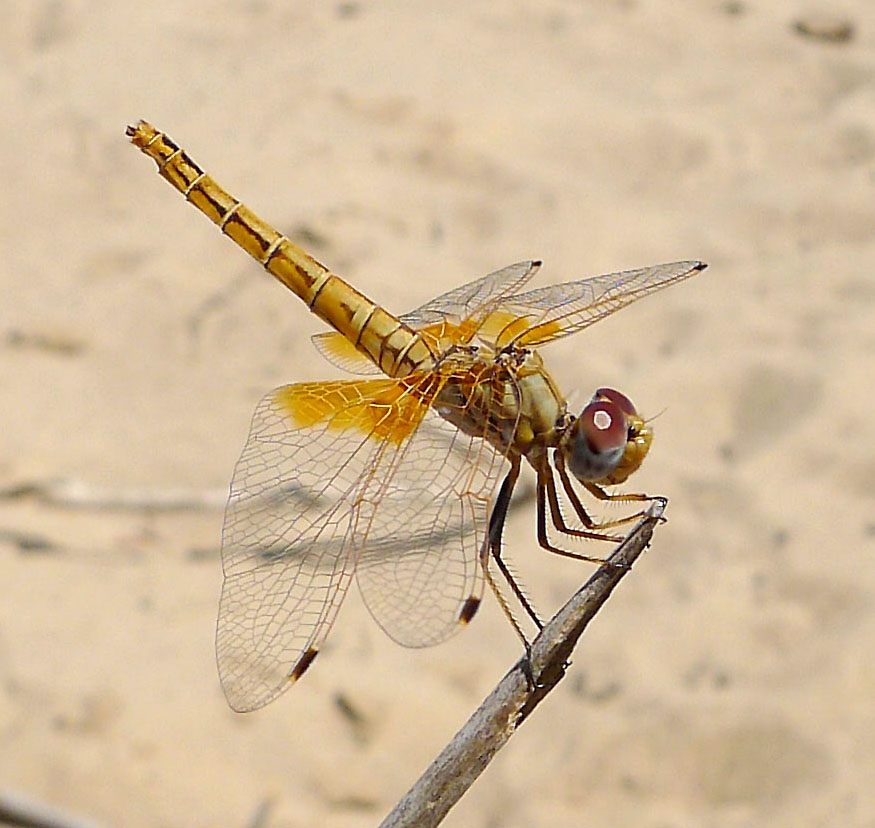
♀

== Suborder: Zygoptera ==
=== Family :Lestidae ===
==== Lestes elatus ====
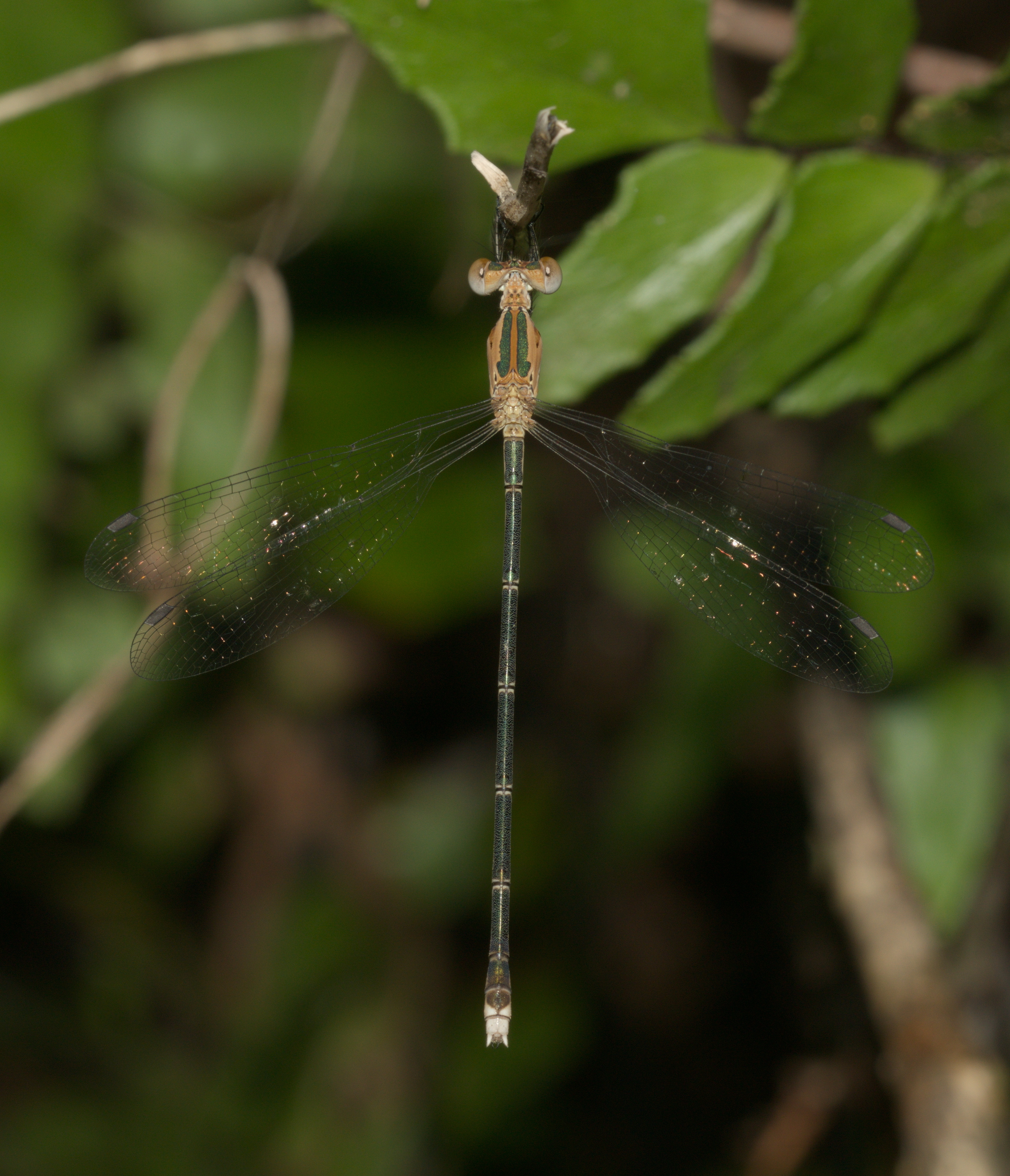
♀

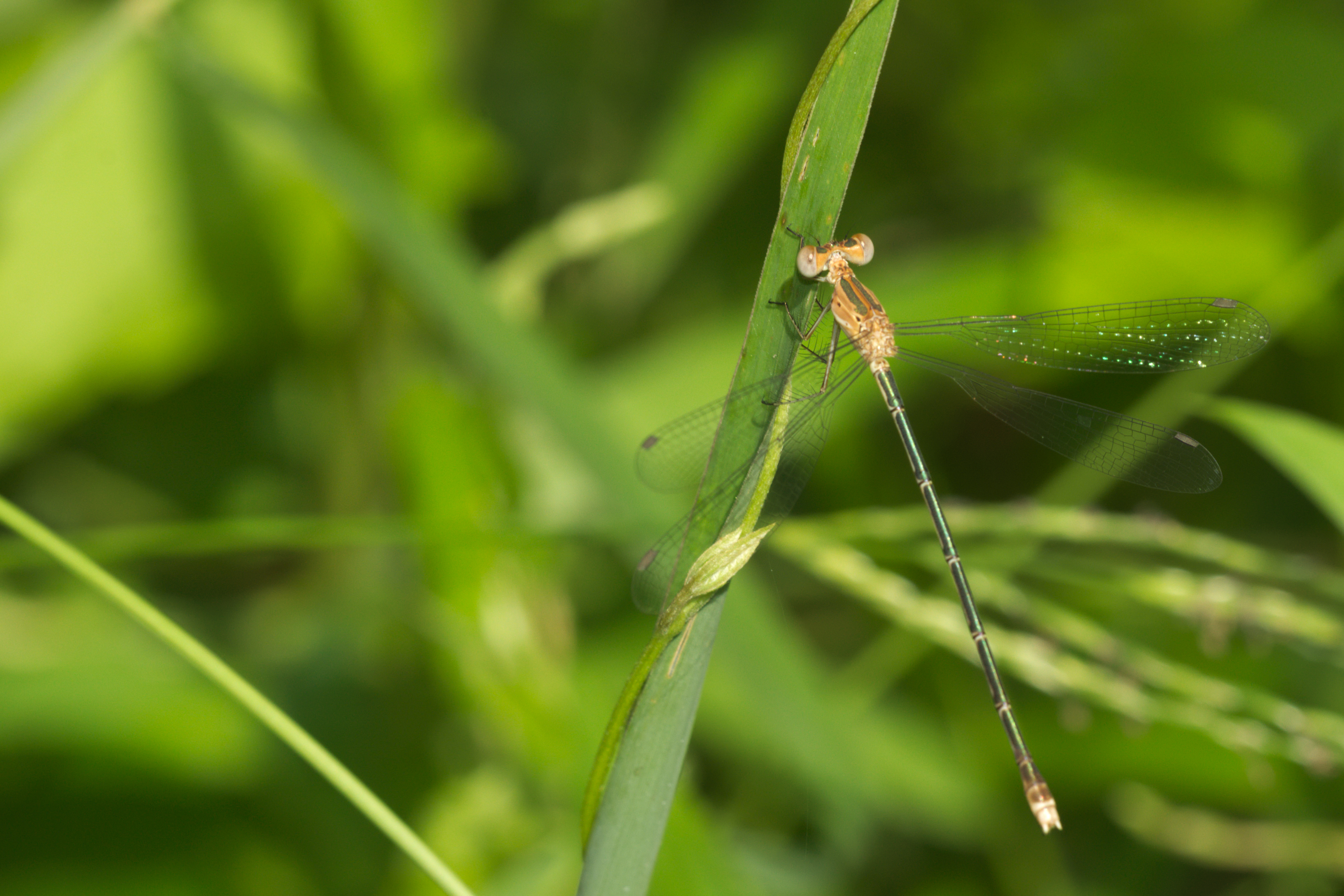
♀

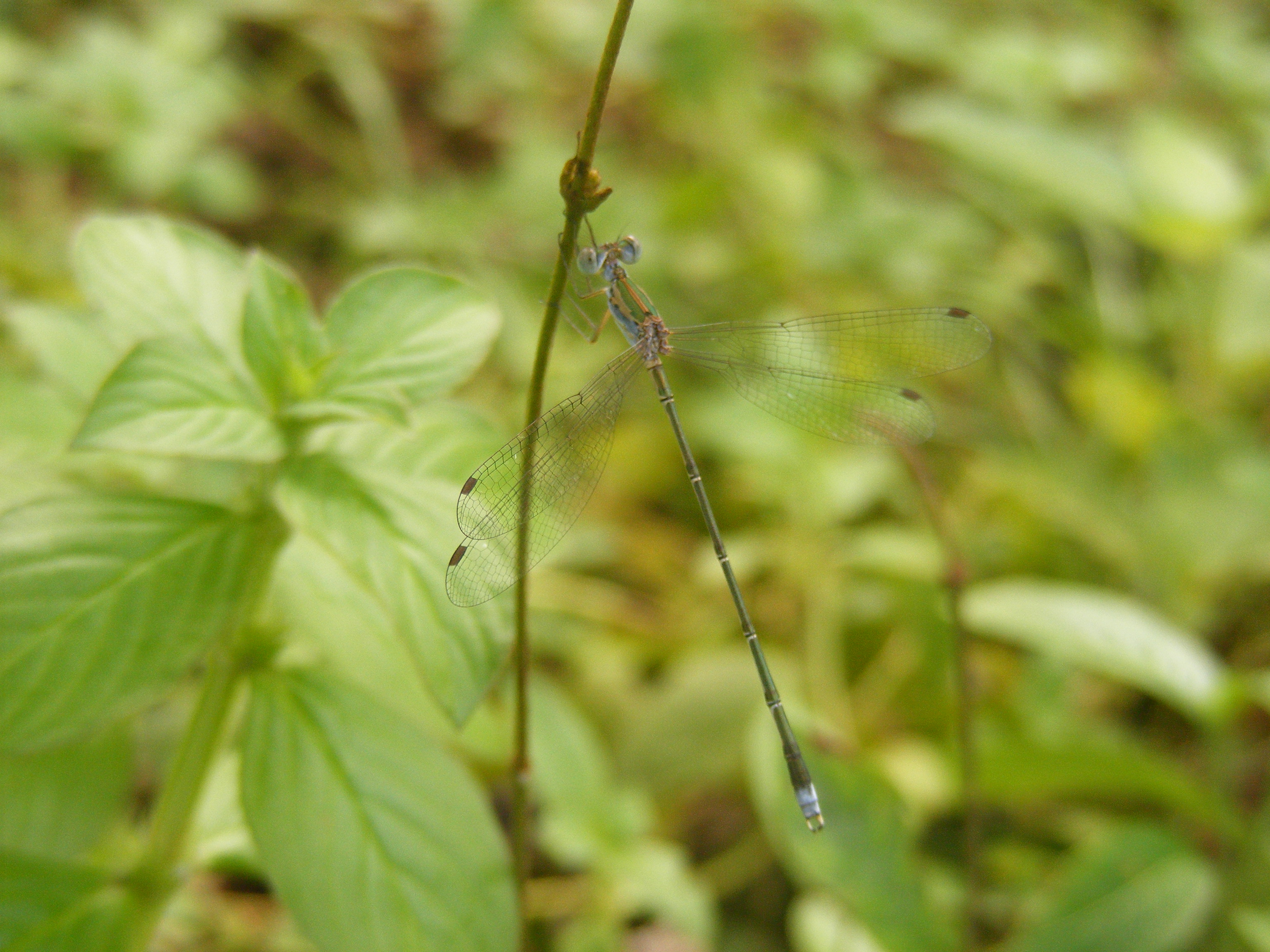
♂

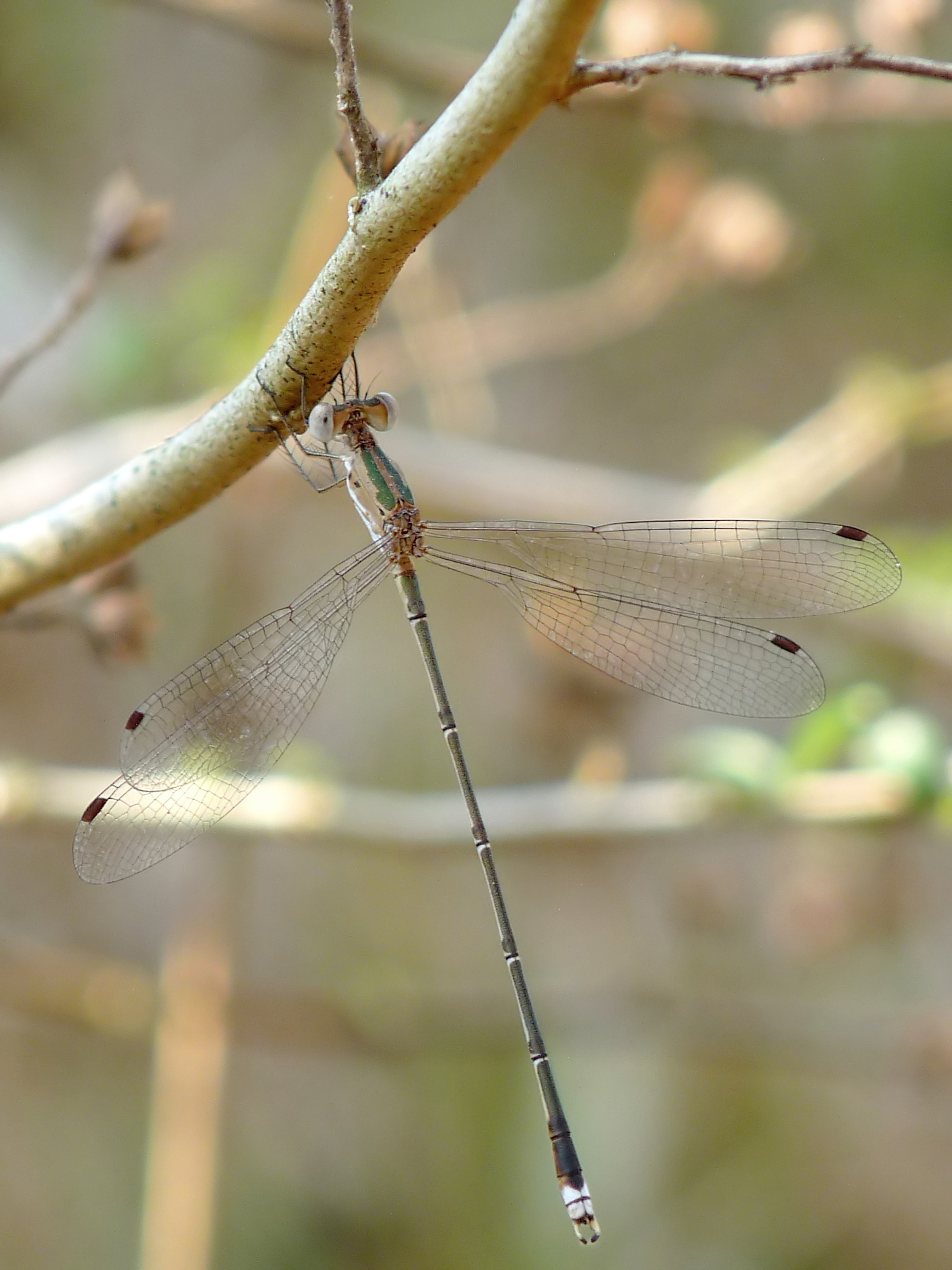
♂

==== Lestes umbrinus ====
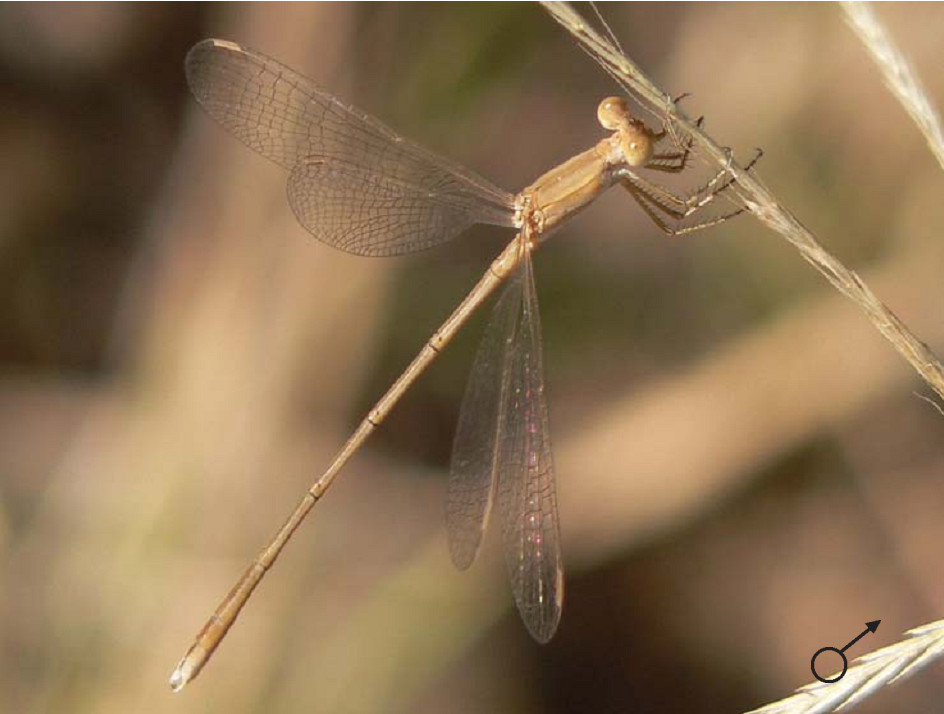
♂

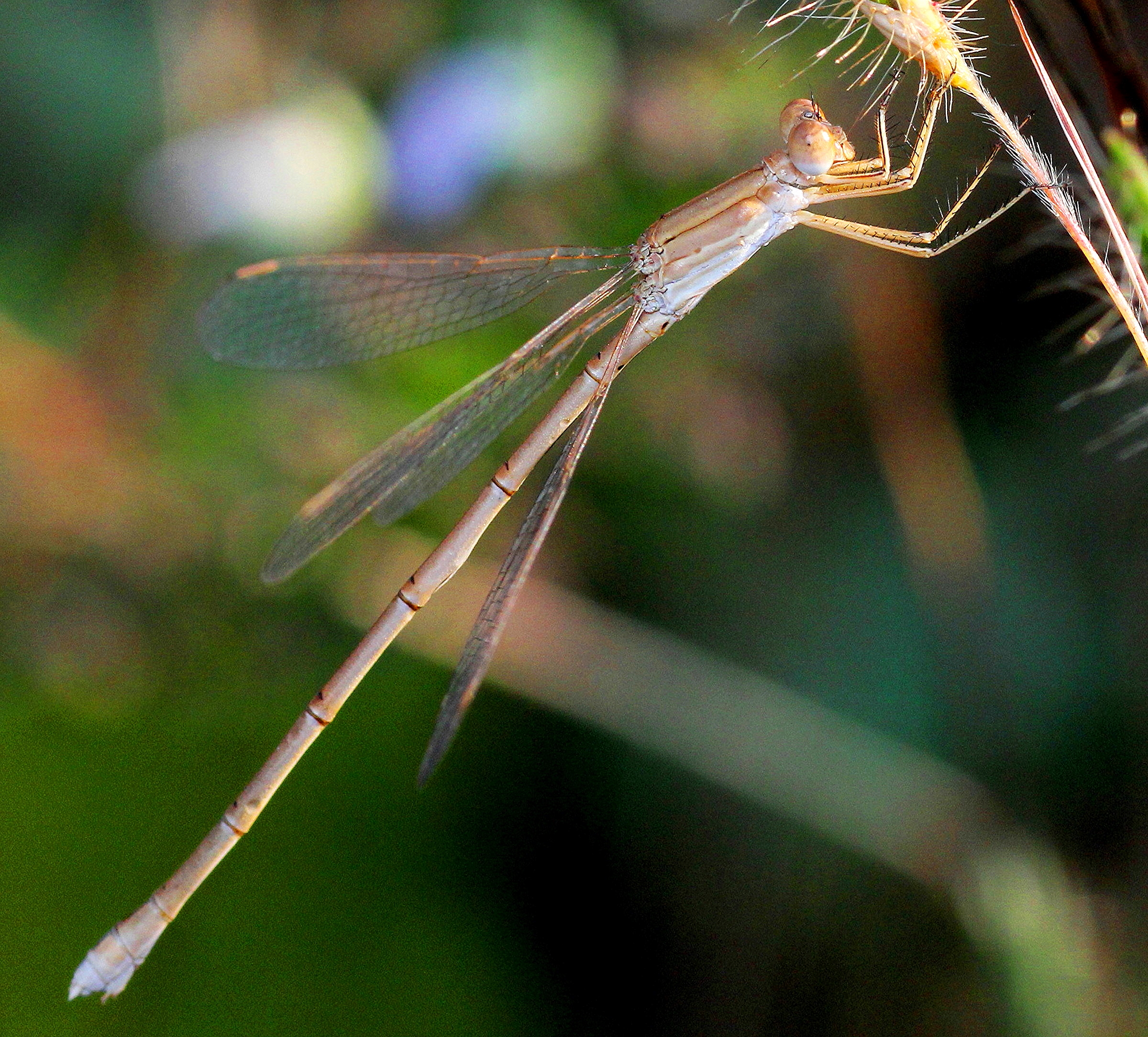
♀

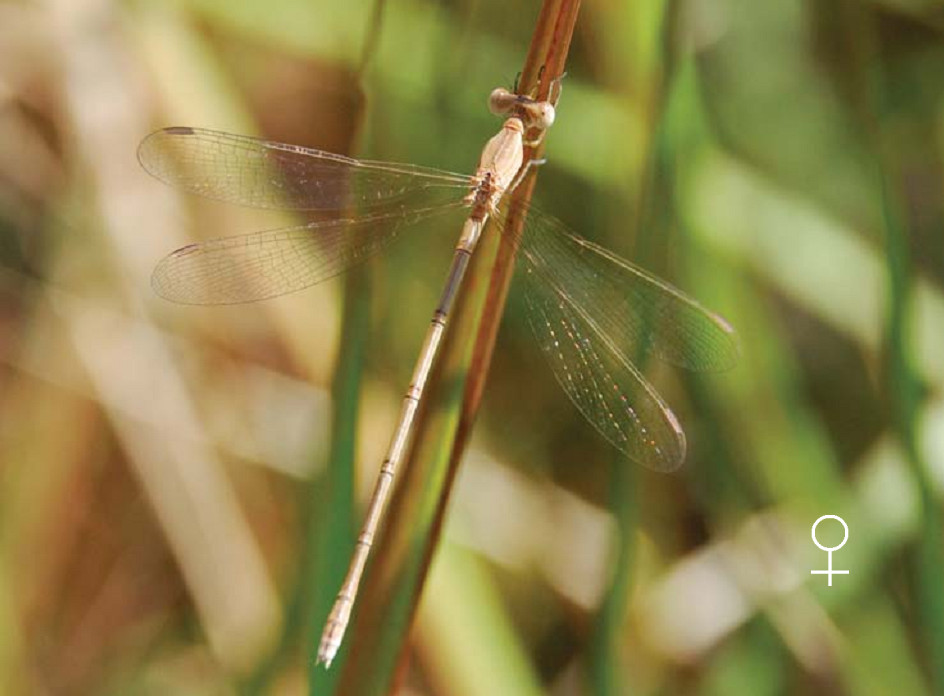
♀

=== Family: Euphaeidae ===
==== Dysphaea ethela ====
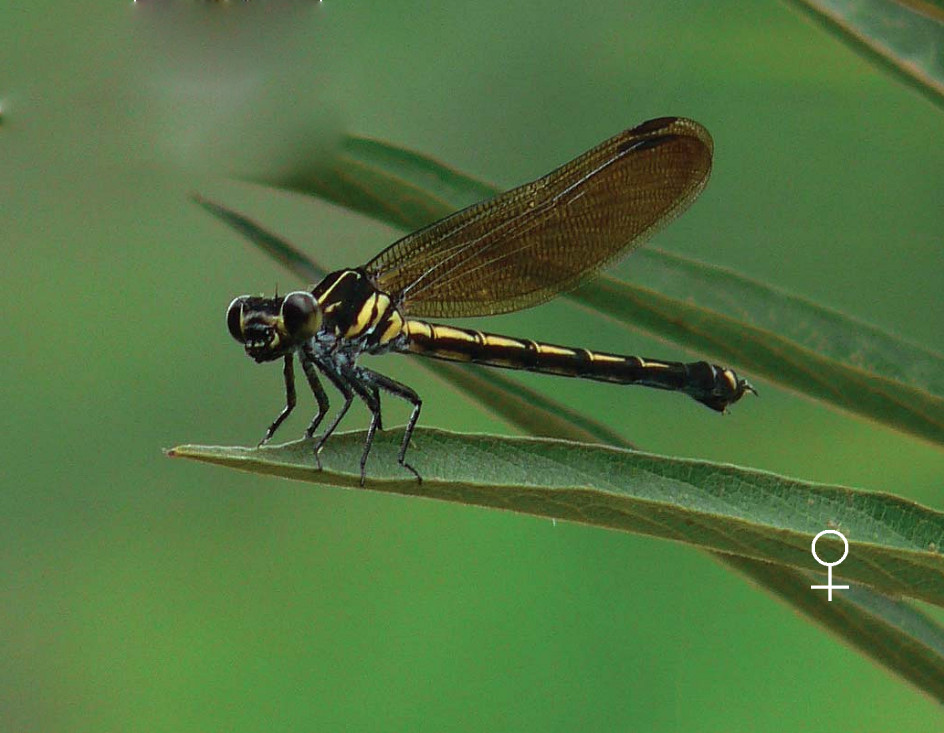
♀

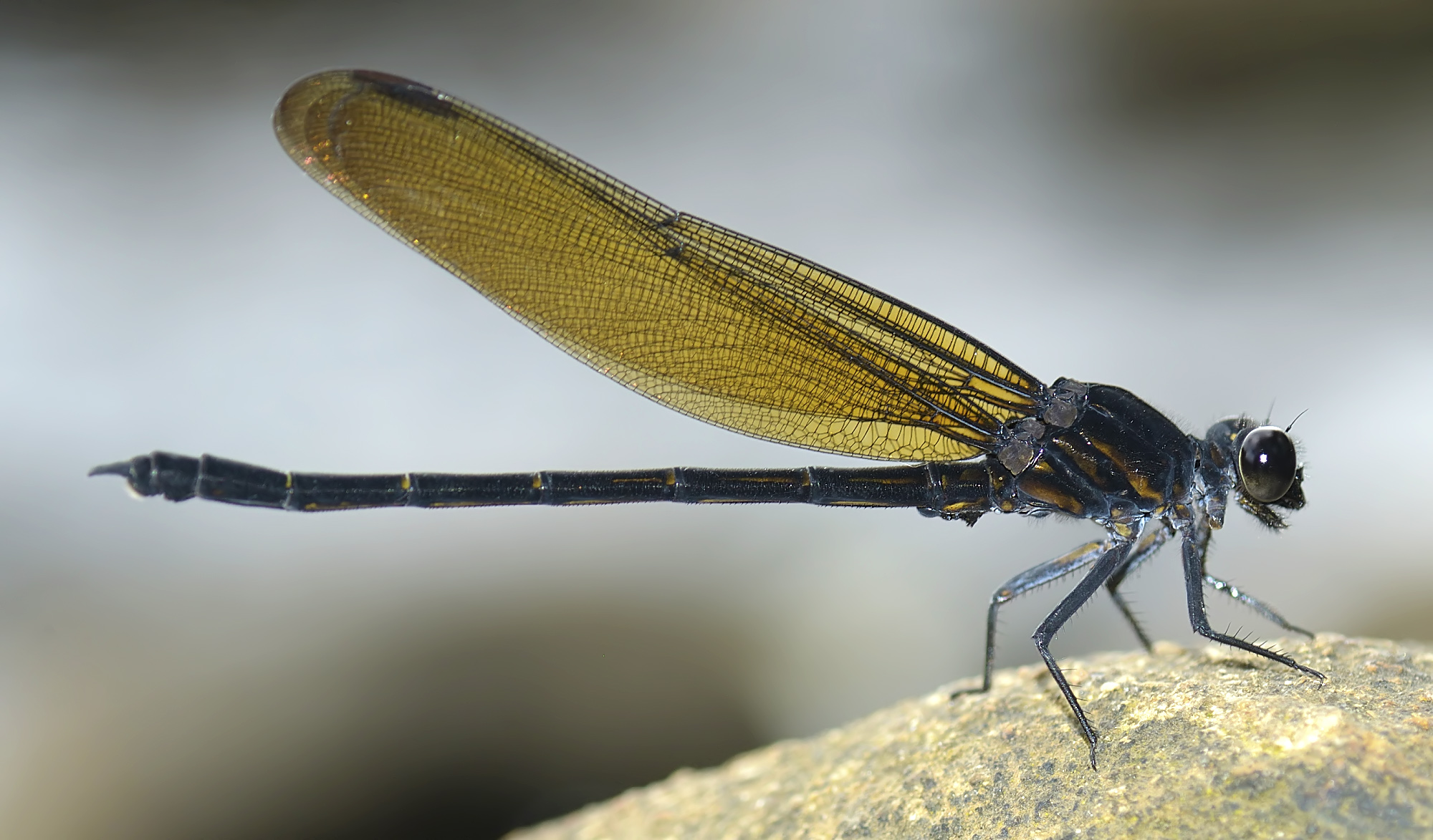
♂

=== Family : Coenagrionidae ===
==== Ischnura senegalensis ====
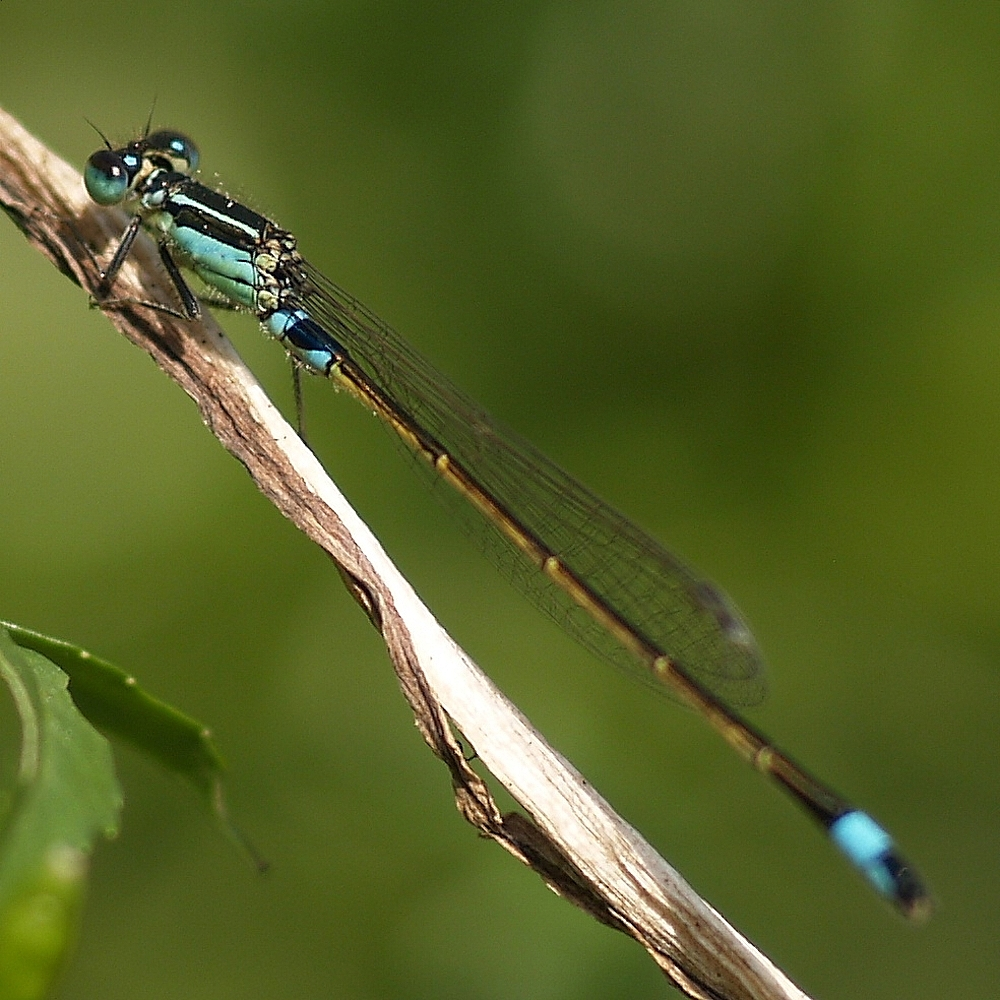
♂

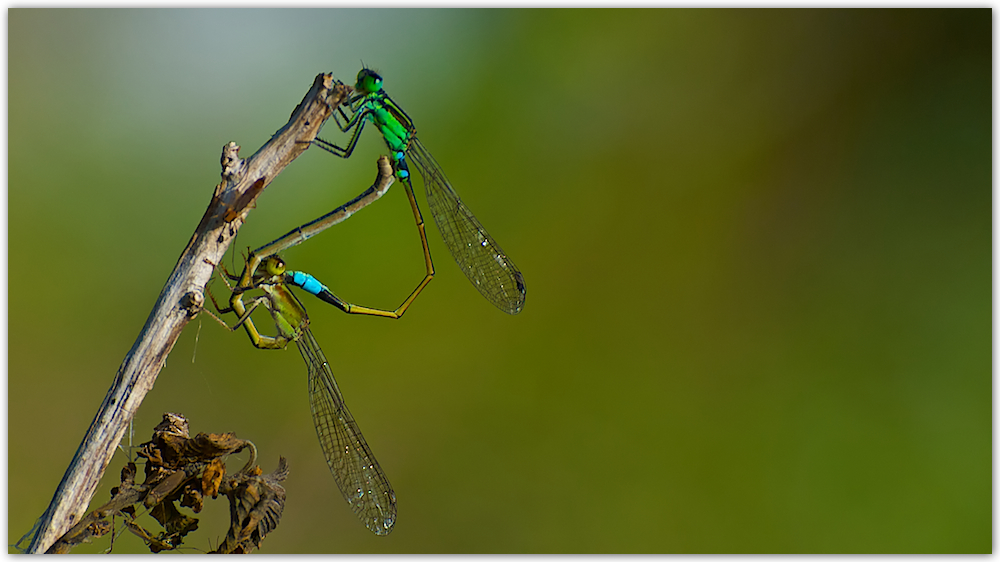
Mating

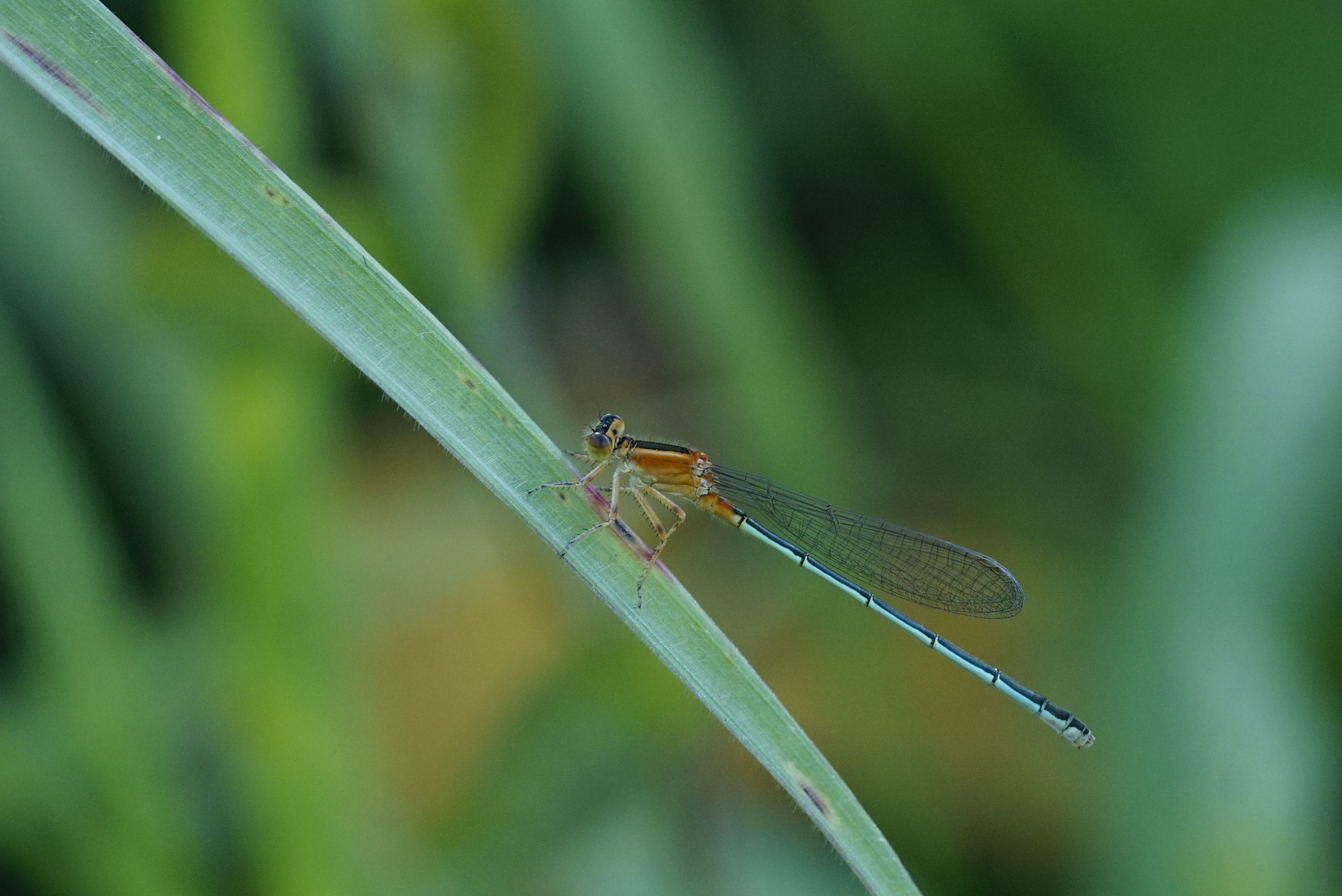
♀

==== Paracercion malayanum ====
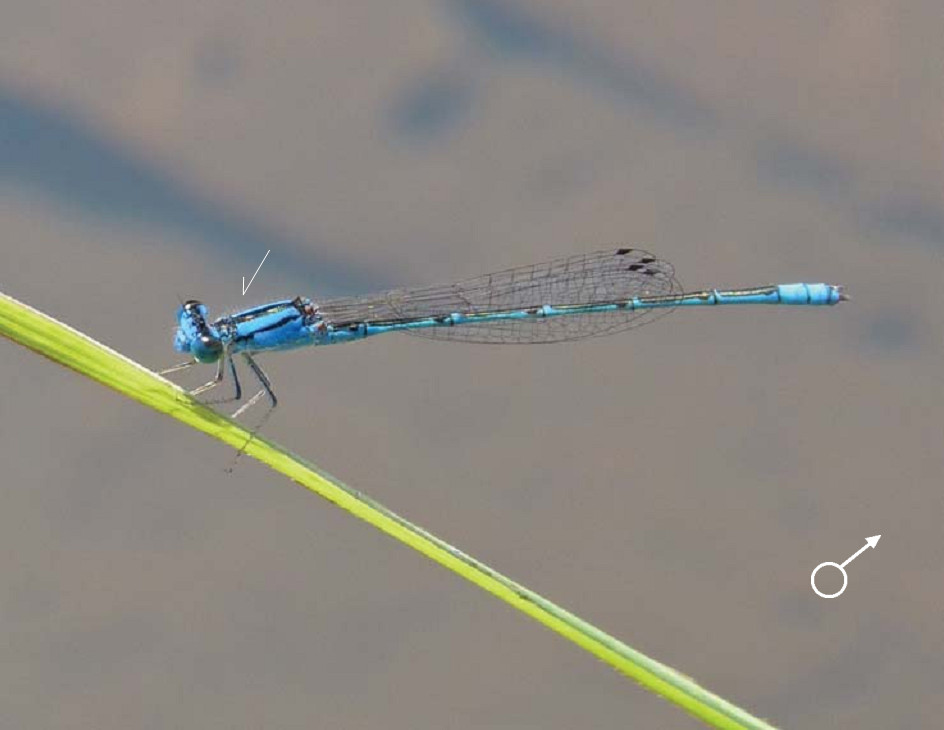

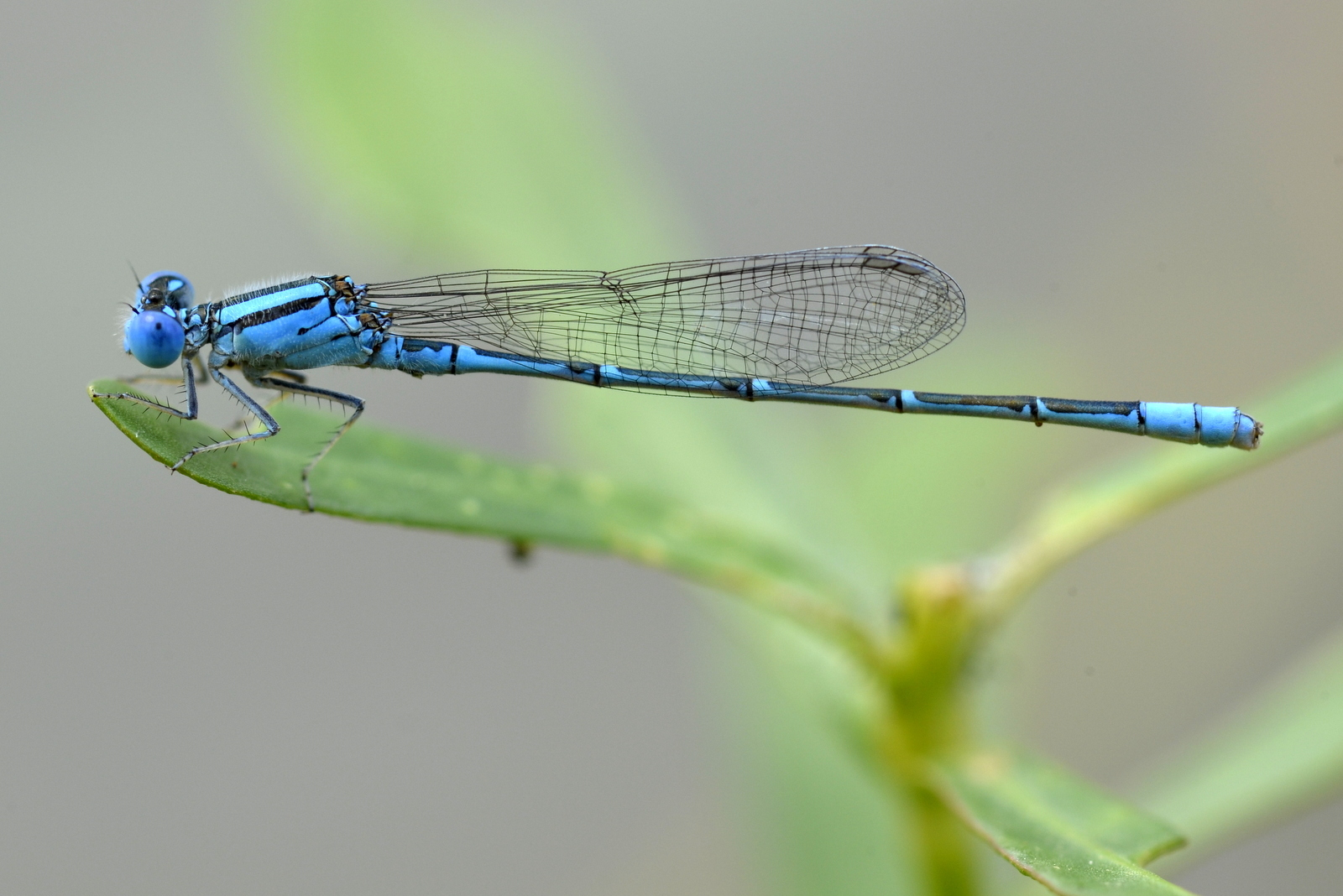

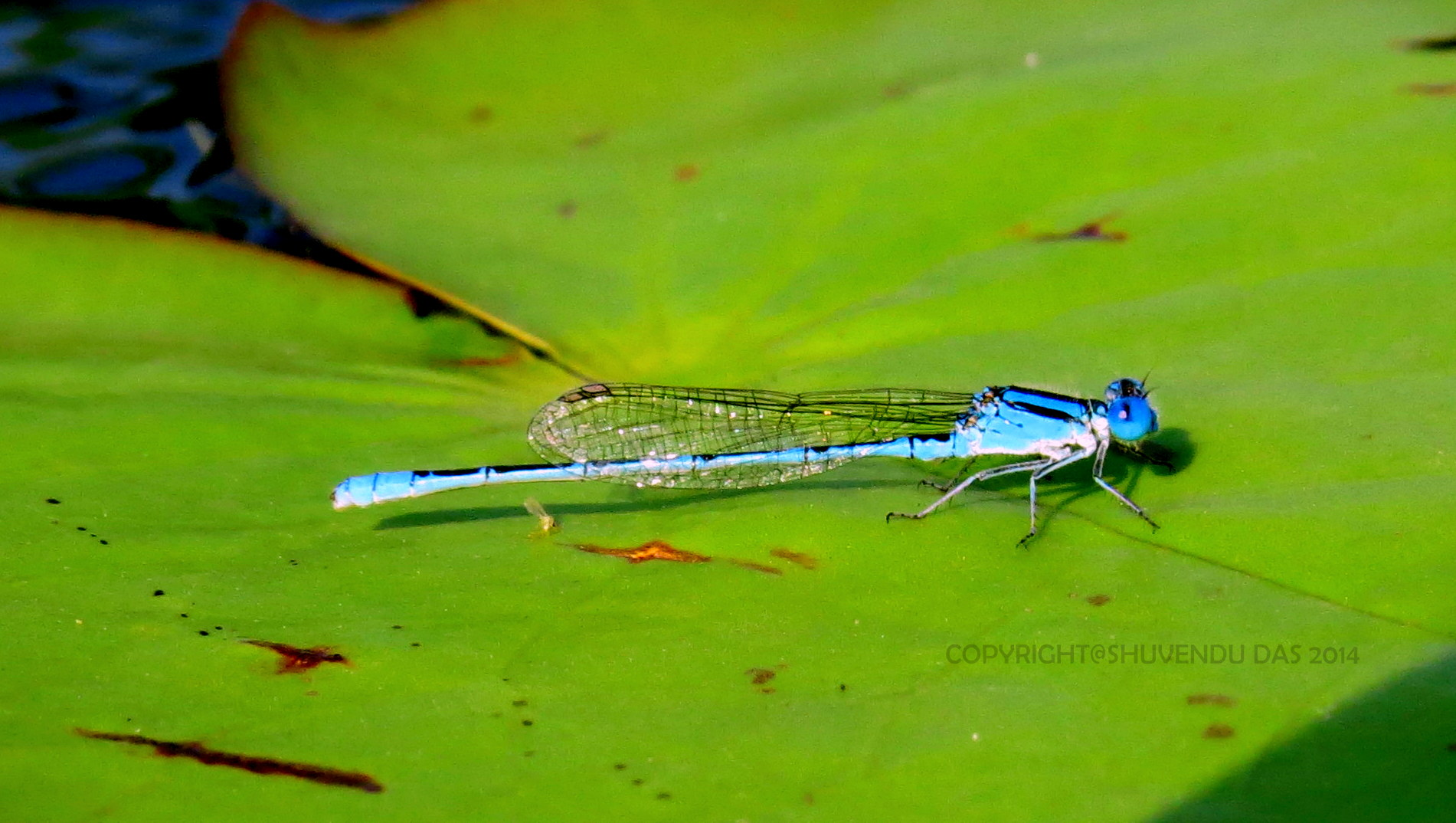

==== Pseudagrion decorum ====
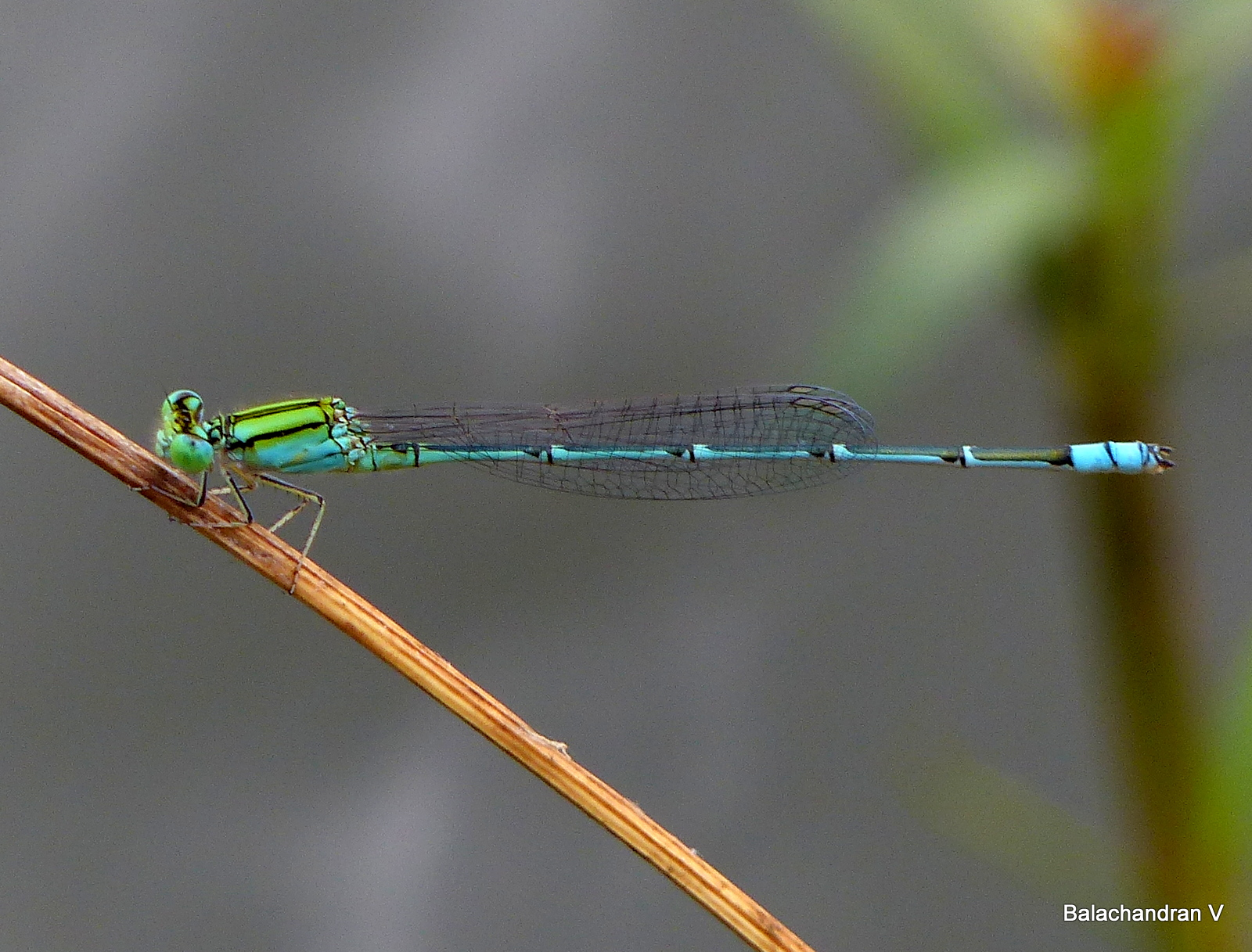
♂

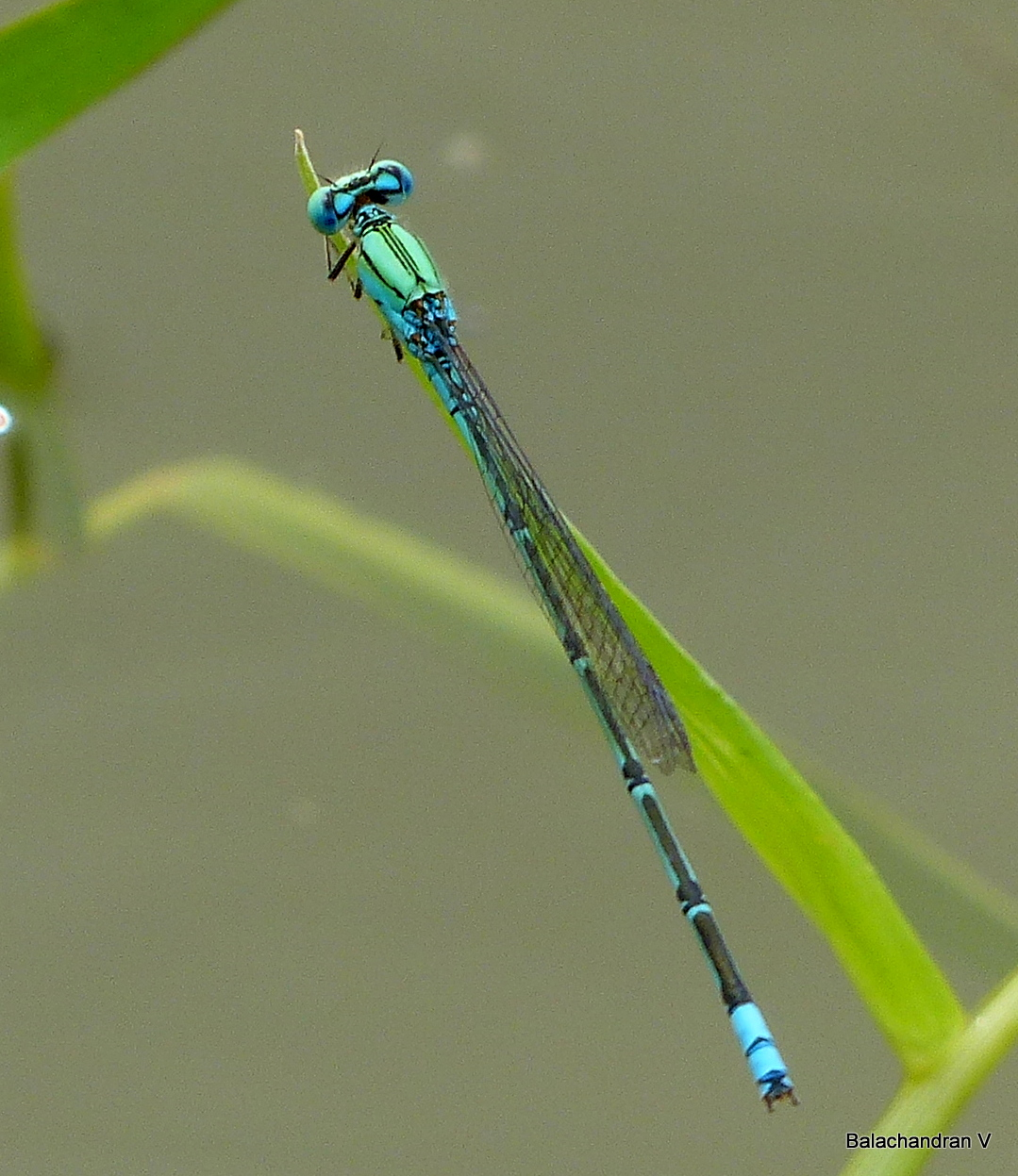
♂

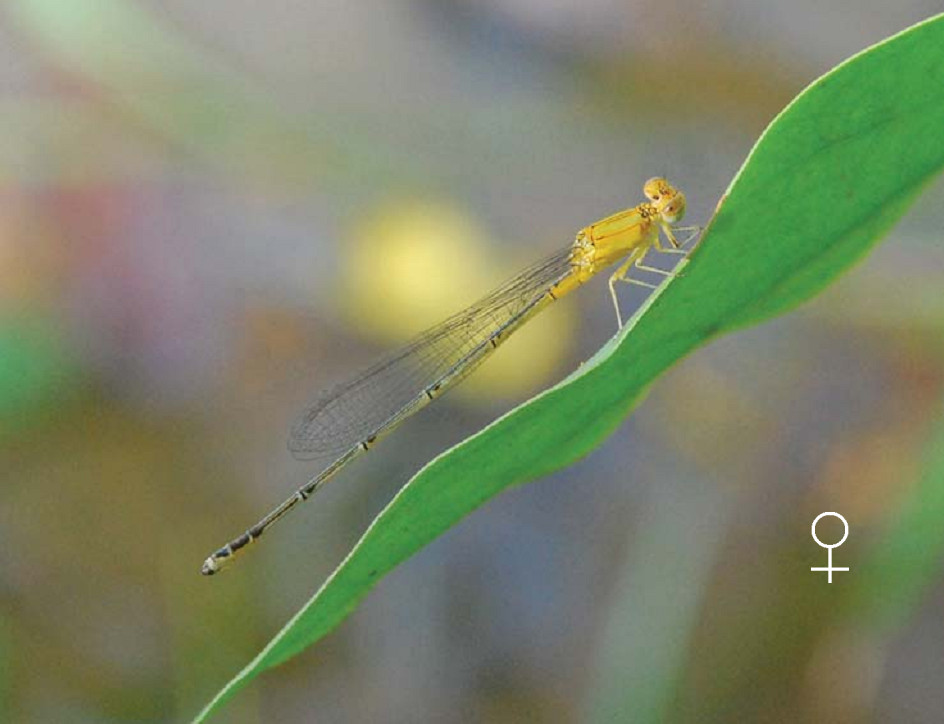
♀

==== Pseudagrion microcephalum ====
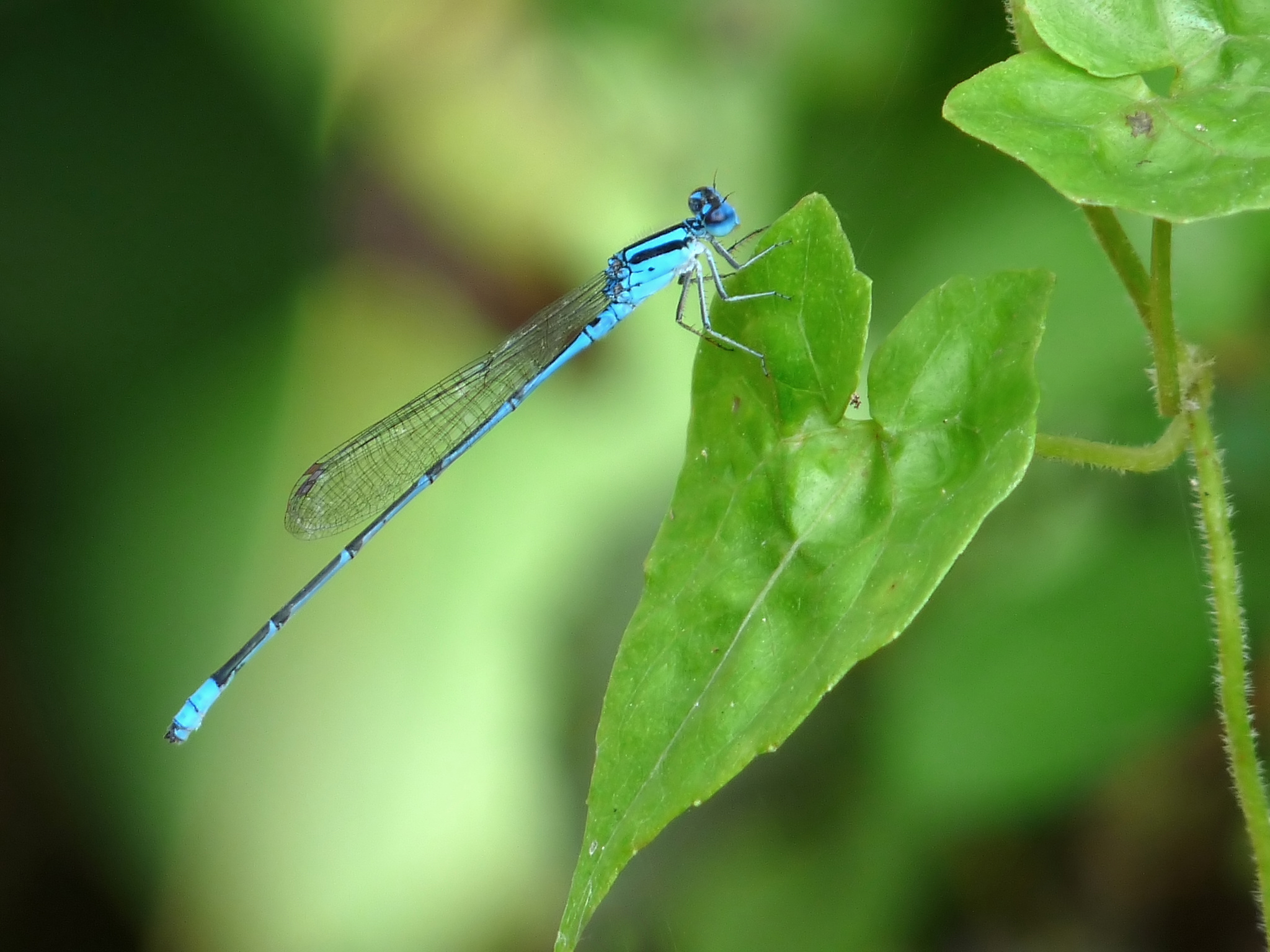
♂

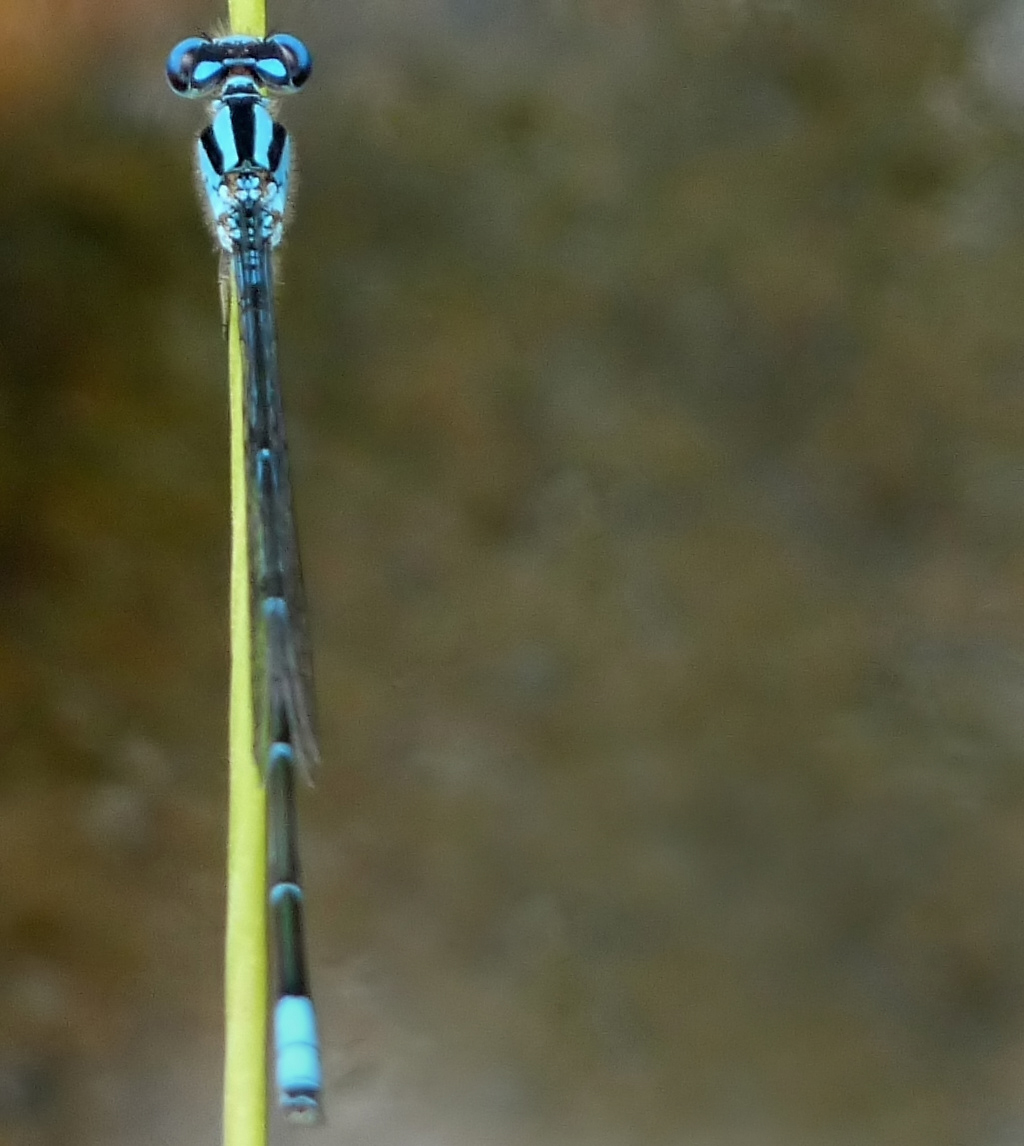
♂

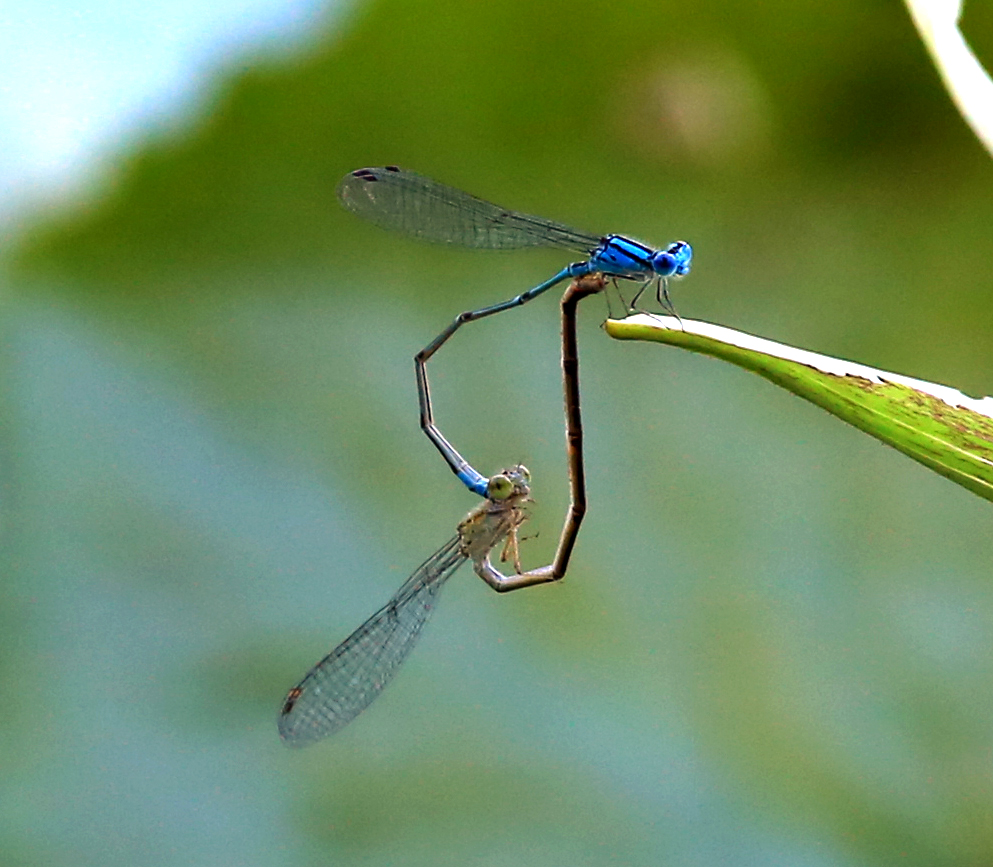
Mating

==== Pseudagrion rubriceps ====
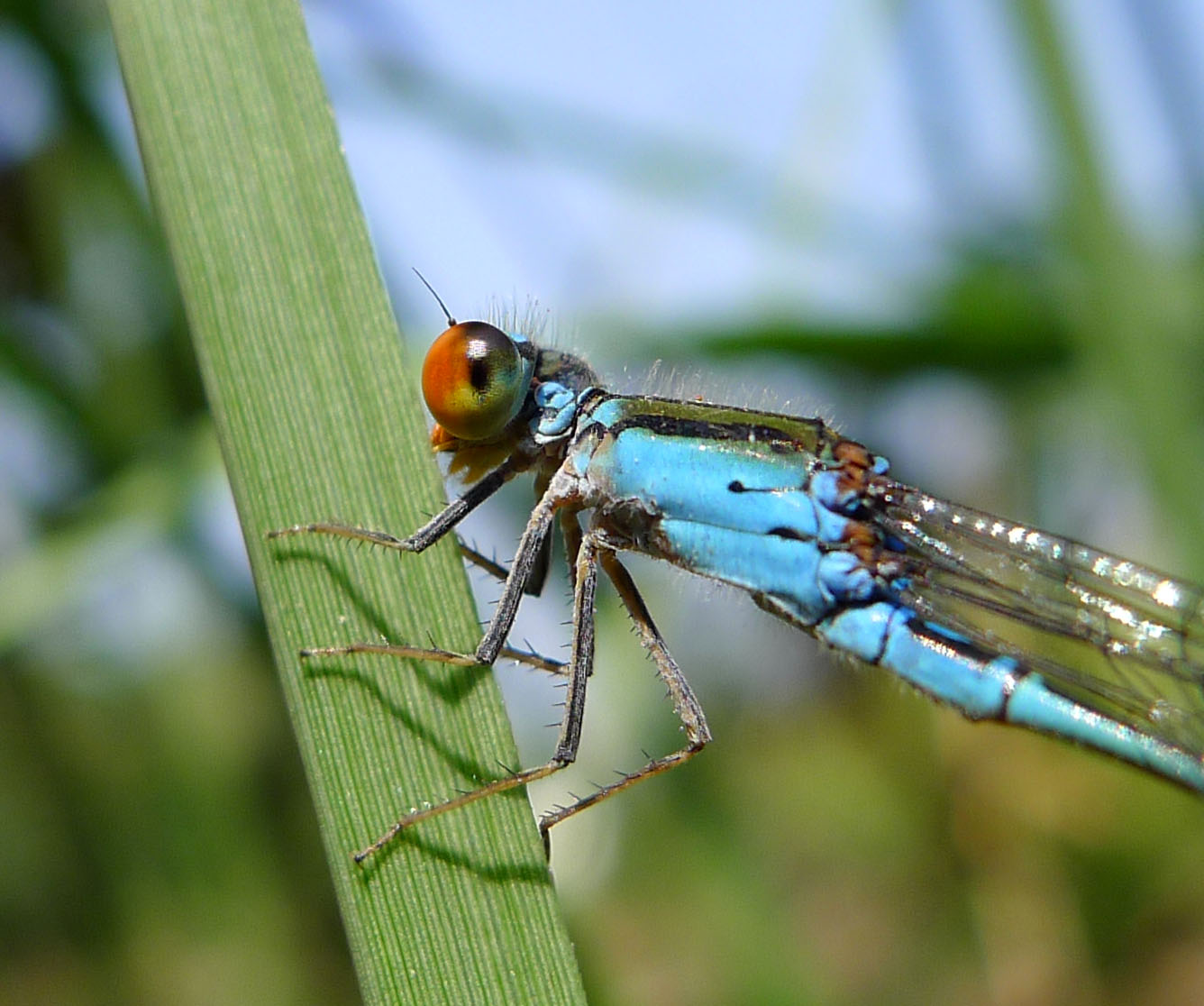
♂

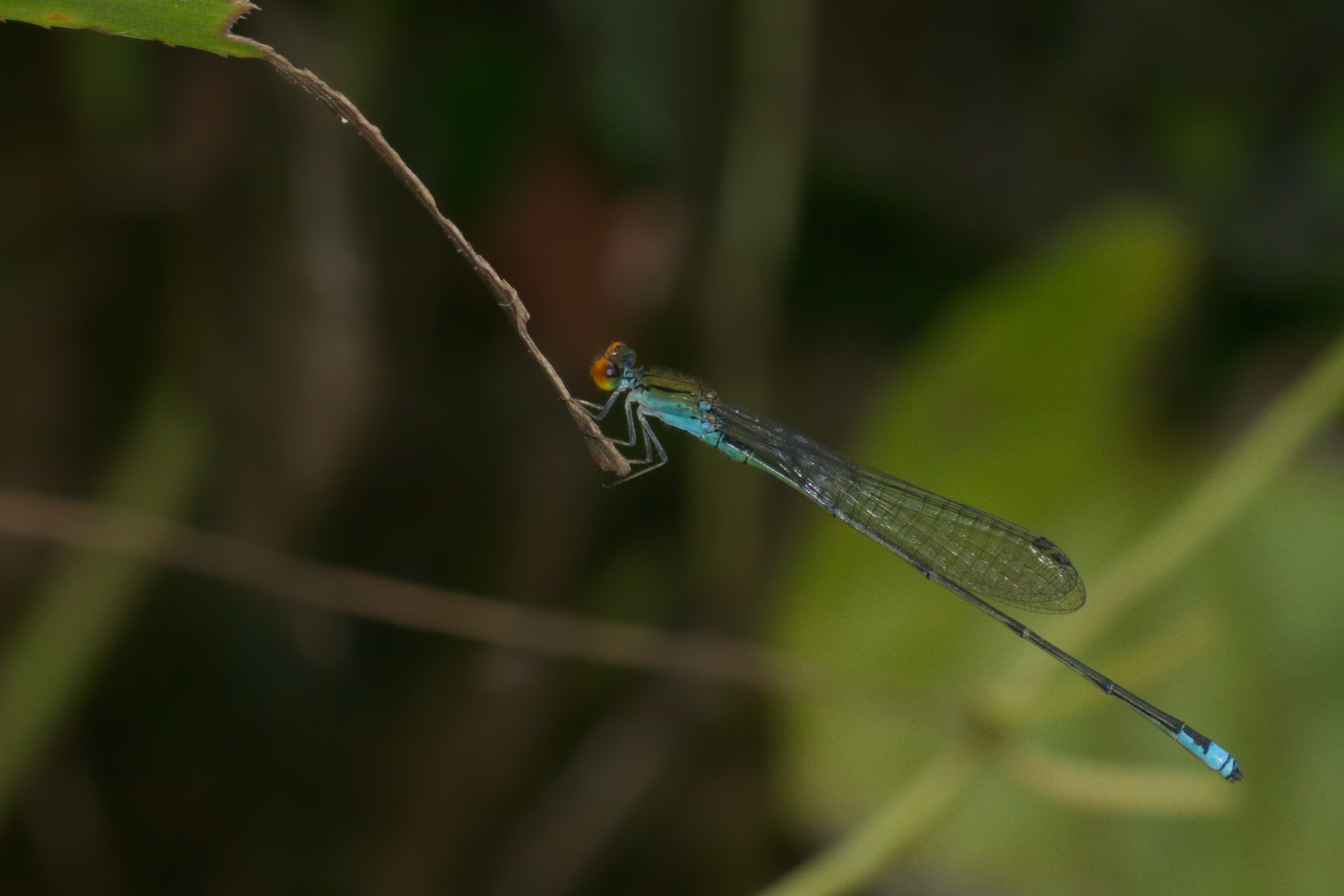
♂

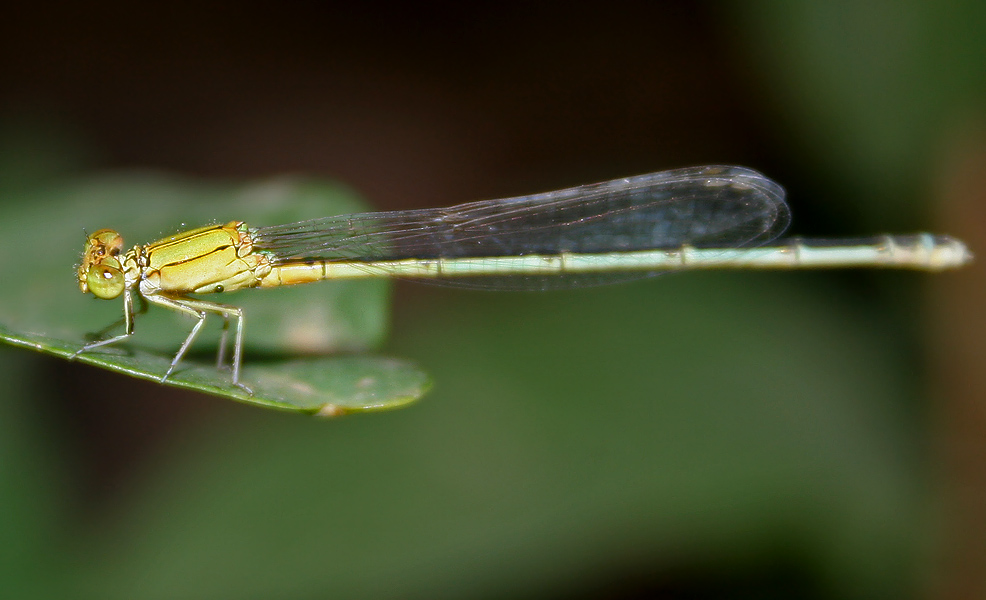
♀

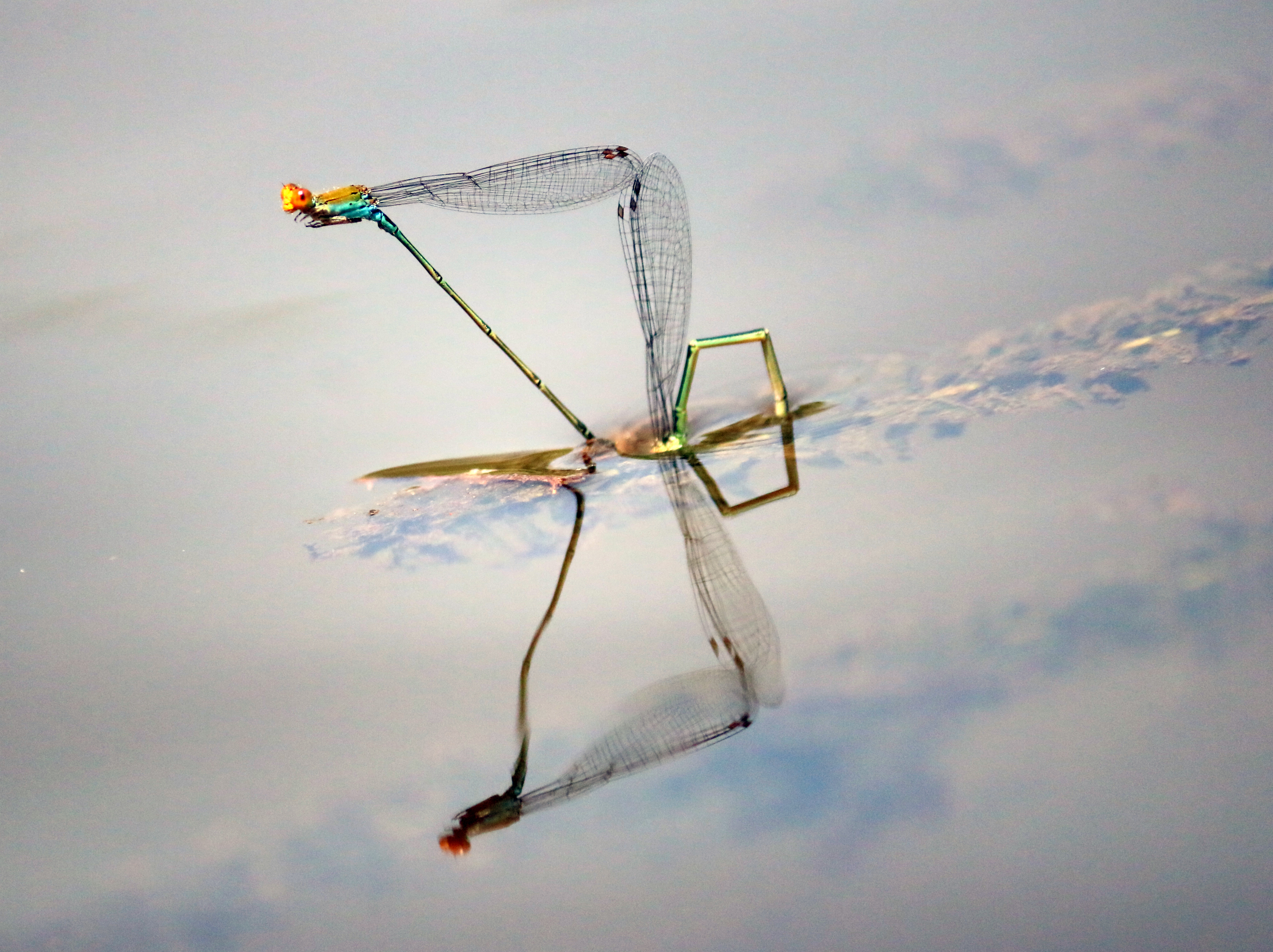
Mating

==== Pseudagrion spencei ====
Epophthalmia vittata
