= List of Odonata species of Chhattisgarh =

This article lists the Odonata species found in the Indian state of Chhattisgarh. There have been a few surveys on the Odonata of Chhattisgarh and many new records from citizens science platforms like iNaturalist. 112 species (66 species of dragonflies and 42 species of damselflies) have been recorded from the state.

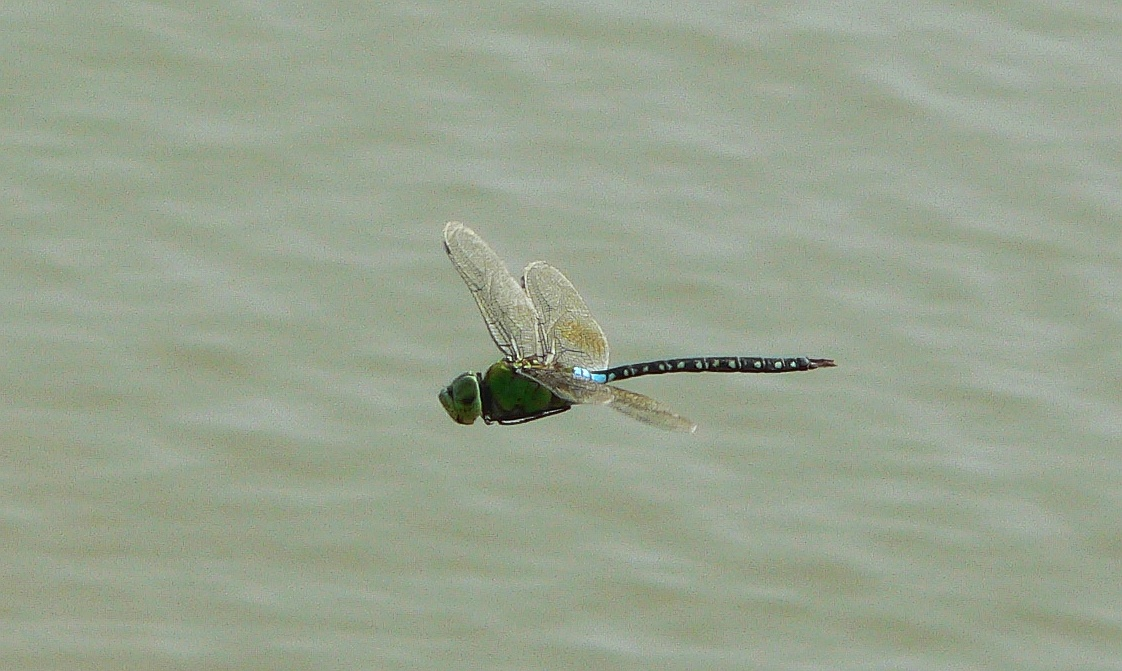
Pale-spotted emperor

== Darners (Aeshnidae) ==
- Rusty darner, Anaciaeschna jaspidea
- Vagrant emperor, Anax ephippiger
- Pale-spotted emperor, Anax guttatus
- Fiery emperor, Anax immaculifrons
- Elephant emperor, Anax indicus
- Small duskhawker, Gynacantha bayadera
- Parakeet darner, Gynacantha millardi
- Dingy duskhwaker, Gynacantha subinterrupta

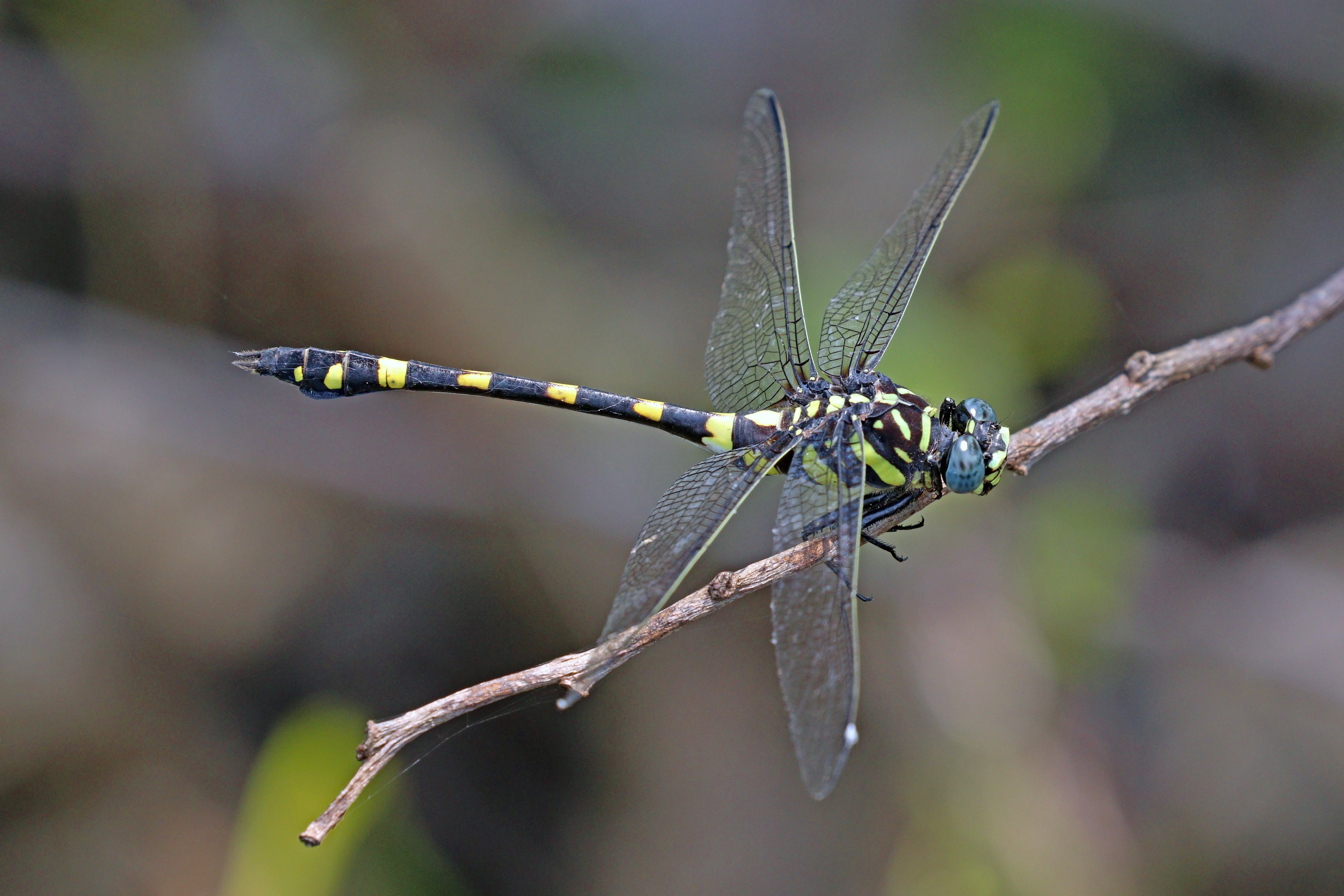
Indian common clubtail

== Clubtails (Gomphidae) ==
- Paddled clubtail, Cyclogomphus heterostylus
- Y-marked clubtail, Cyclogomphus ypsilon
- T-marked clubtail, Gomphidia t-nigrum
- Kishor's clubtail, Ictinogomphus kishori
- Indian common clubtail, Ictinogomphus rapax
- Deccan bowtail, Macrogomphus annulatus
- Seductive bowtail, Macrogomphus annulatus
- Pygmy clubtail, Microgomphus souteri
- Collared pygmy clubtail, Microgomphus torquatus
- Lined hooktail, Paragomphus lineatus

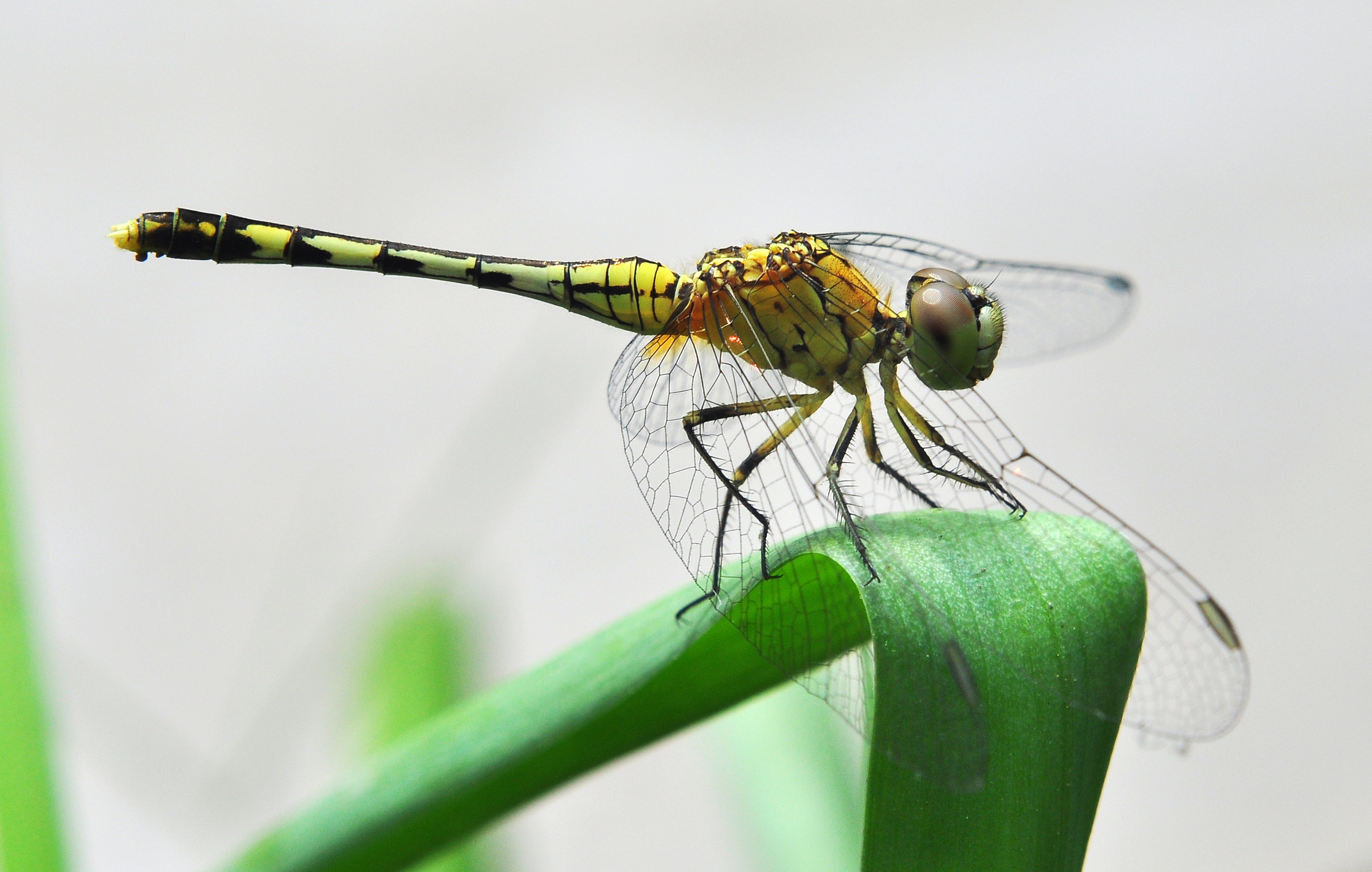
Chalky percher

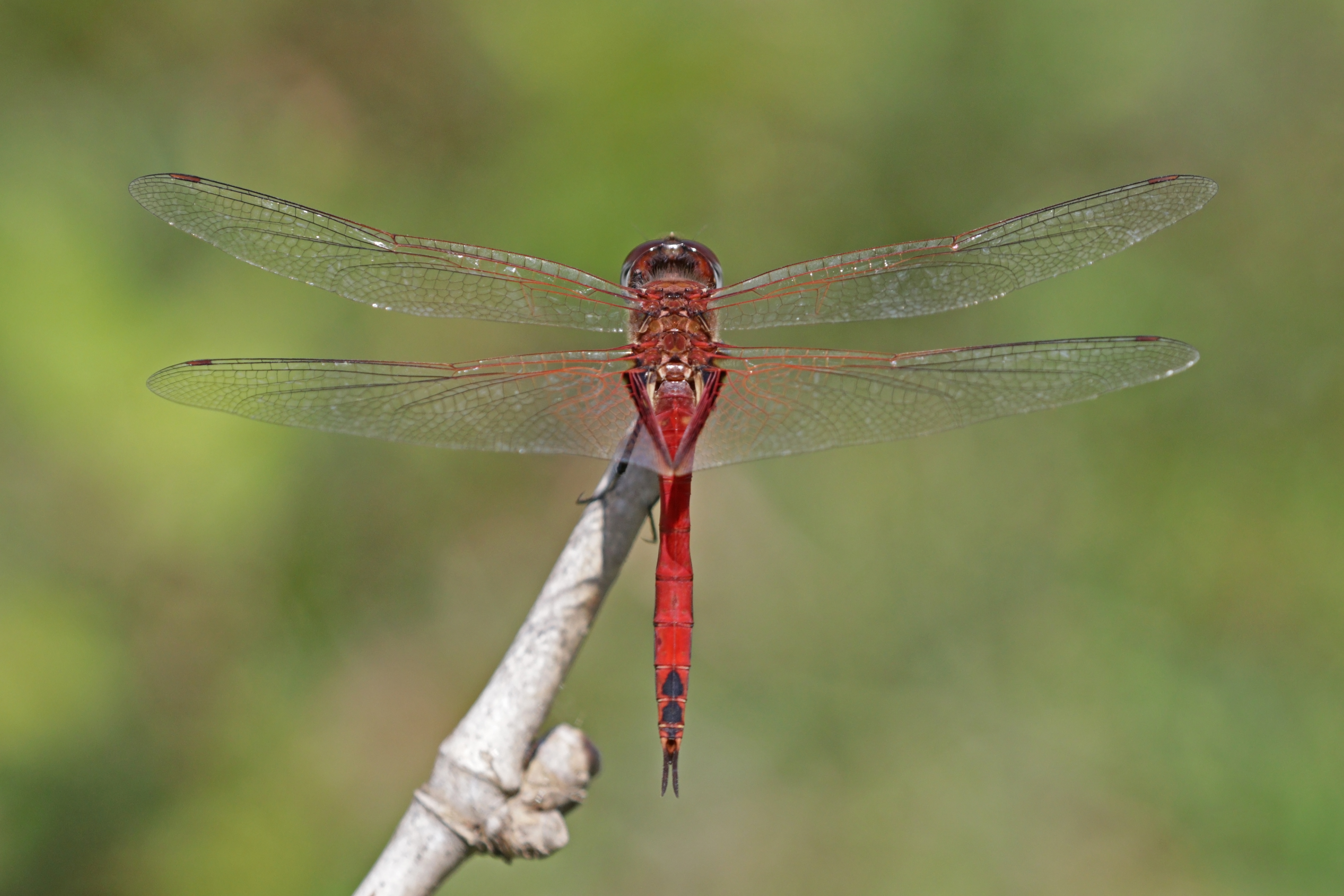
Ferruginous glider

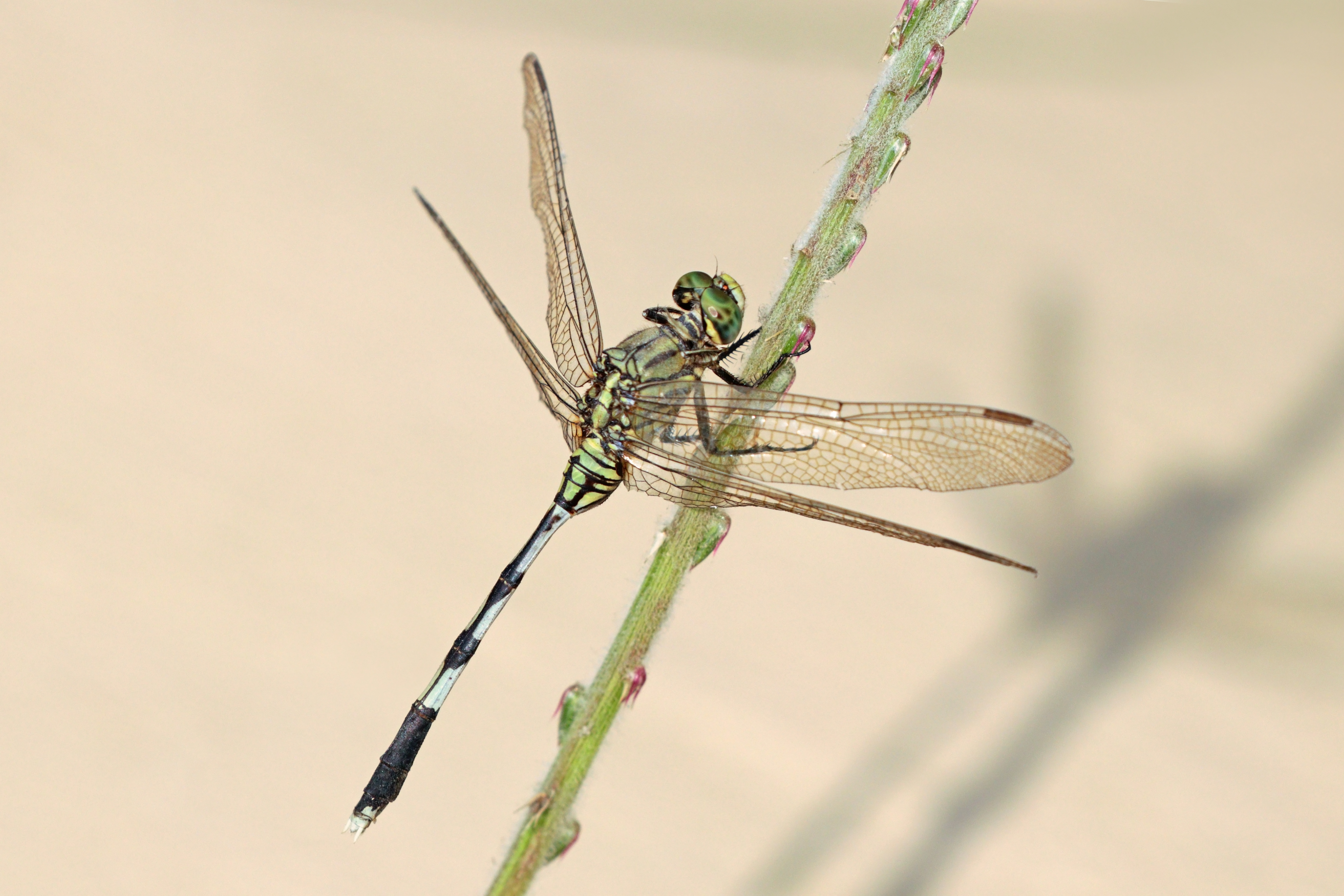
Slender skimmer

== Skimmers (Libellulidae) ==
- Grizzled pintail, Acisoma panorpoides
- Scarlet adjutant, Aethriamanta brevipennis
- Oriental blue dasher, Brachydiplax chalybea
- Emerald-flanked marsh hawk, Brachydiplax farinosa
- Little blue marsh hawk, Brachydiplax sobrina
- Ditch jewel, Brachythemis contaminata
- Konkan rockdweller, Bradinopyga konkanensis
- Granite ghost, Bradinopyga geminata
- Sultan, Camacinia gigantea
- Emerald-banded skimmer, Cratilla lineata
- Scarlet skimmer, Crocothemis servilia
- Black percher, Diplacodes lefebvrii
- Charcoal-winged percher, Diplacodes nebulosa
- Chalky percher, Diplacodes trivialis
- Amber-winged glider, Hydrobasileus croceus
- White-tipped demon, Indothemis carnatica
- Restless demon, Indothemis limbata
- Asian bloodtail, Lathrecista asiatica
- Russet percher, Neurothemis fulvia
- Paaddyfield parasol, Neurothemis intermedia
- Pied paddy skimmer, Neurothemis tullia
- Stellate river hawk, Onychothemis testacea
- Brown-bcked red marsh hawk, Orthetrum chrysis
- Blue marsh hawk, Orthetrum glaucum
- Slender blue skimmer, Orthetrum luzonicum
- Crimson-tailed marsh hawk, Orthetrum pruinosum
- Slender skimmer, Orthetrum sabina
- Little skimmer, Orthetrum taeniolatum
- Asian widow, Palpopleura sexmaculata
- Wandering glider, Pantala flavescens
- Swampwatcher, Potamarcha congener
- Rufous marsh glider, Rhodothemis rufa
- Asian sapphire flutterer, Rhyothemis triangularis
- Common picturewing, Rhyothemis variegata
- Pygmy skimmer, Tetrathemis platyptera
- Twister, Tholymis tillarga
- Keyhole glider, Tramea basilaris
- Ferruginous glider, Tramea limbata
- Saddlebag glider, Tramea virginia
- Crimson marsh glider, Trithemis aurora
- Black stream glider, Trithemis festiva
- Orange-winged dropwing, Trithemis kirbyi
- Long-legged marsh glider, Trithemis pallidinervis
- Scarlet basker, Urothemis signata
- Emerald cascader, Zygonyx iris
- Dingy dusk-darter, Zyxomma petiolatum

== Cruisers (Macromiidae) ==
- Common torrent hawk, Epophthalmia vittata
- Rambur's torrent hawk, Macromia cingulata

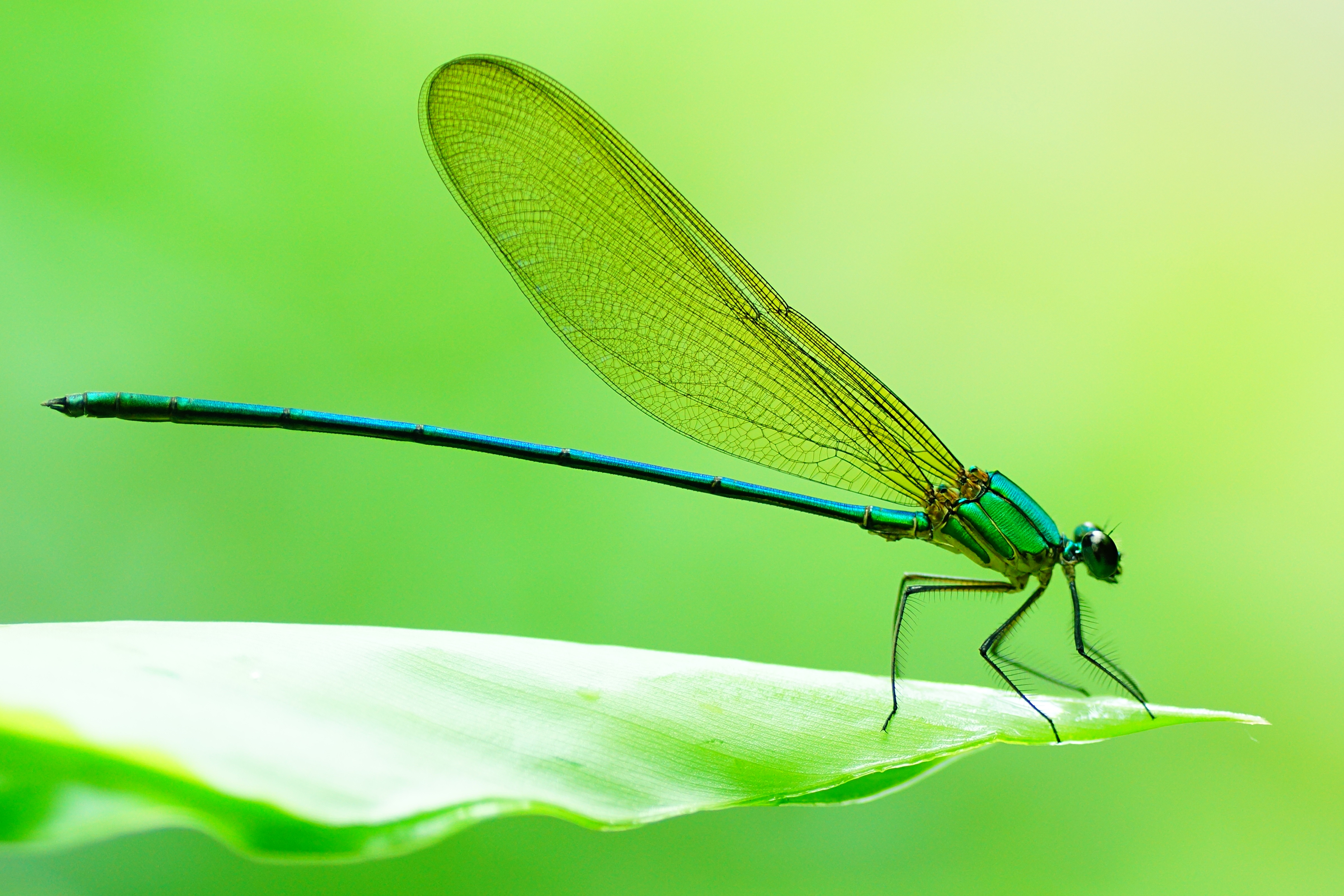
Plain flashwing

== Broad-winged damselflies (Calopterygidae) ==
- Green metalwing, Neurobasis chinensis
- Smaragdin's metalwing, Vestalaria smaragdina
- Black-tipped forest glory, Vestalis apicalis
- Plain flashwing, Vestalis gracilis

== Jewels (Chlorocyphidae) ==
- Three-banded emerald jewel, Aristocypha trifasciata
- Stream ruby, Heliocypha bisignata
- Bifurcated jewel, Heliocypha biforata
- Southern heliodor, Libellago indica
- Golden gem, Libellago lineata

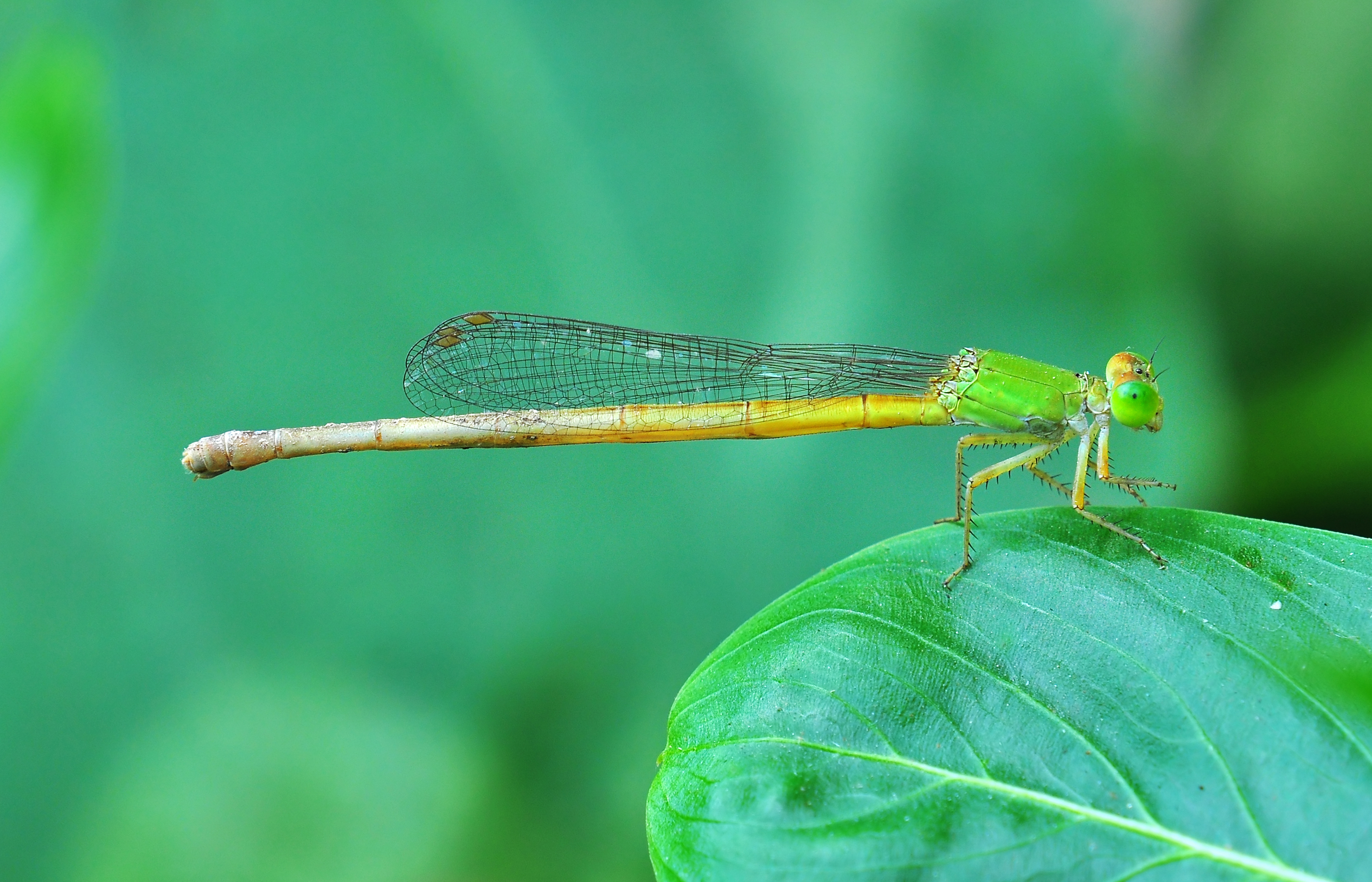
Coromandel marsh dart

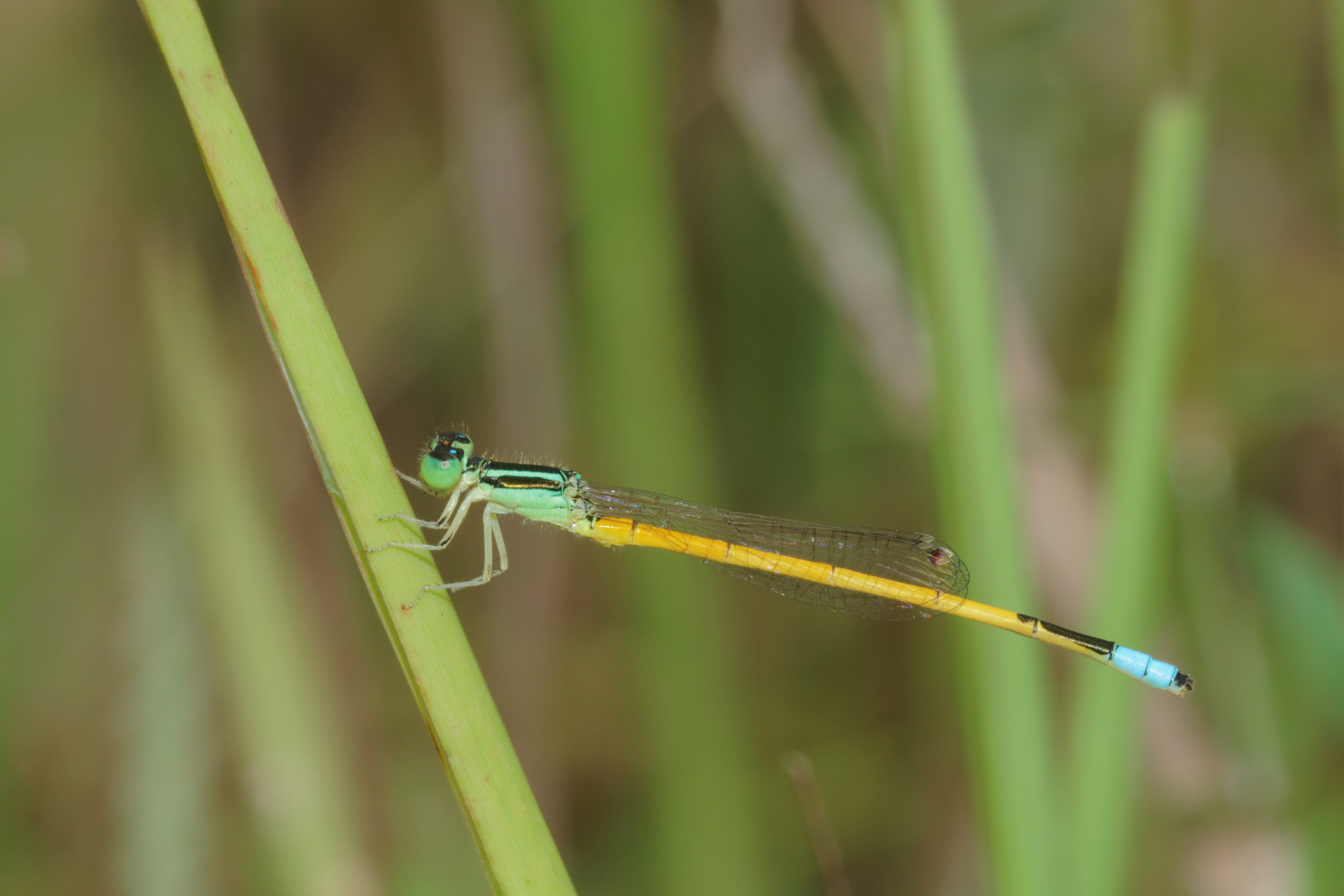
Western golden dartlet

== Narrow-winged damselflies (Coenagrionidae) ==
- Hisop's dartlet, Aciagrion hisopa
- Green-striped slender dartlet, Aciagrion occidentale
- Olympic dartlet, Aciagrion olympicum
- Pale slender dartlet, Aciagrion pallidum
- Fraser's dartlet, Agriocnemis dabreui
- Milky midget, Agriocnemis lacteola
- White dartlet, Agriocnemis pieris
- Wandering midget, Agriocnemis pygmaea
- Splendid dartlet, Agriocnemis splendidissima
- Azure dartlet, Amphiallagma parvum
- Orange-tailed marsh dart, Ceriagrion cerinorubellum
- Coromandel marsh dart, Ceriagrion coromandelianum
- Rusty marsh dart, Ceriagrion olivaceum
- Orange marsh dart, Ceriagrion rubiae
- Pixie dartlet, Ischnura nursei
- Western golden dartlet, Ischnura rubilio
- Reddish-orange dartlet, Ischnura rufostigma
- Common bluetail, Ischnura senegalensis
- Eastern lilysquatter, Paracercion melanotum
- Look-alike sprite, Pseudagrion australasiae
- Three-striped blue dart, Pseudagrion decorum
- Malabar dartlet, Pseudagrion malabaricum
- Blue riverdamsel, Pseudagrion microcephalum
- Orange-faced sprite, Pseudagrion rubriceps
- Brook sprite, Pseudagrion spencei

== Spreadwings (Lestidae) ==
- Dusky spreadwing, Lestes concinnus
- Kirby's spreadwing, Lestes decipiens
- Asian emerald spreadwing, Lestes elatus
- Emerald-striped spreadwing, Lestes viridulus

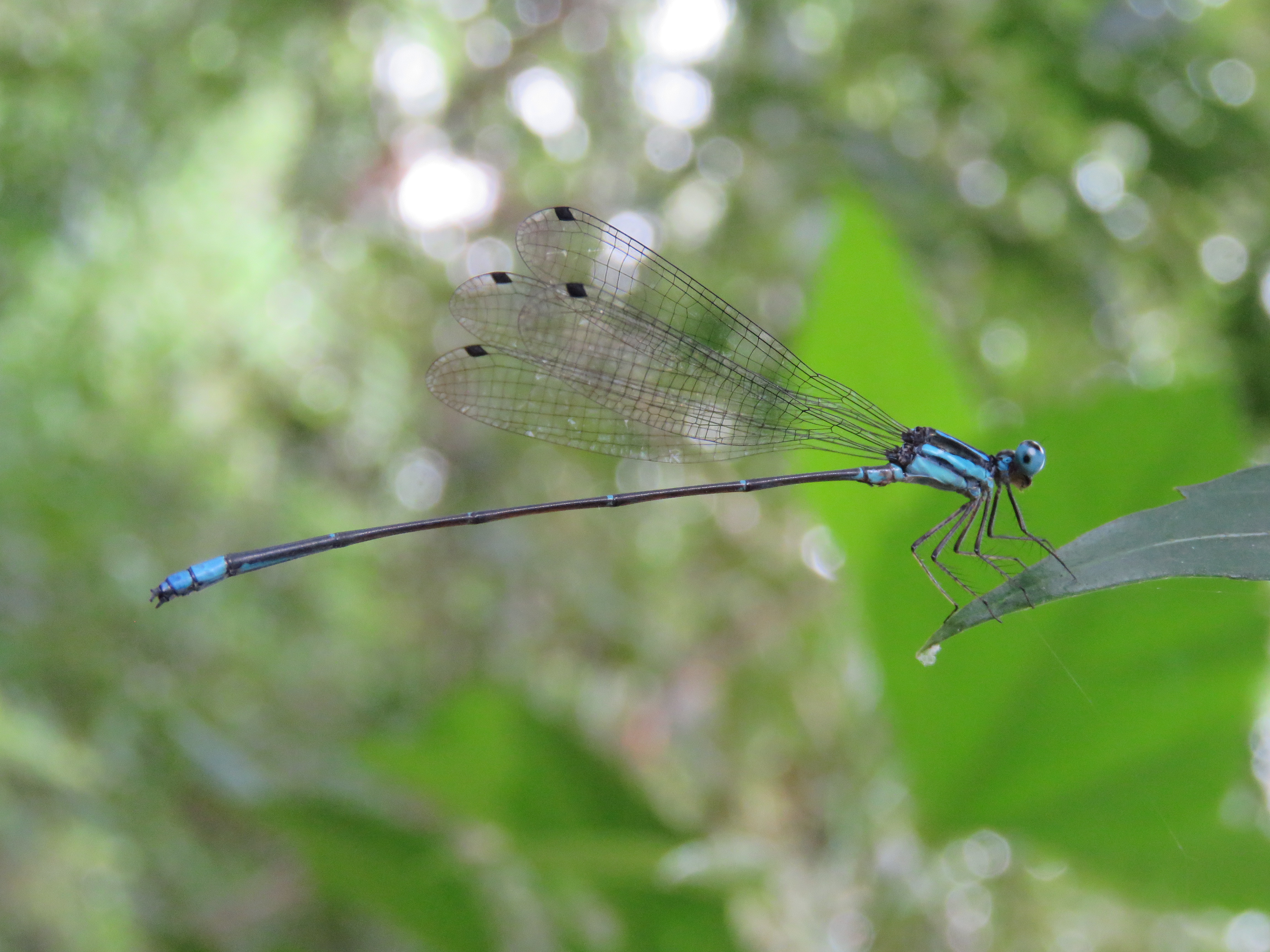
Coorg bambootail

== White-legged damselflies (Platycnemidae) ==
- Coorg bambootail, Caconeura ramburi
- Yellow featherlegs, Copera marginipes
- Blue bush dart, Copera vittata
- Black-winged bambootail, Disparoneura quadrimaculata
- Marsh dancer, Onychargia atrocyana
- Red-striped black bambootail, Prodasineura verticalis
- Black-kneed featherleg, Pseudocopera ciliata

== Gossamerwings (Euphaeidae) ==
- Black torrent dart, Dysphaea ethela
