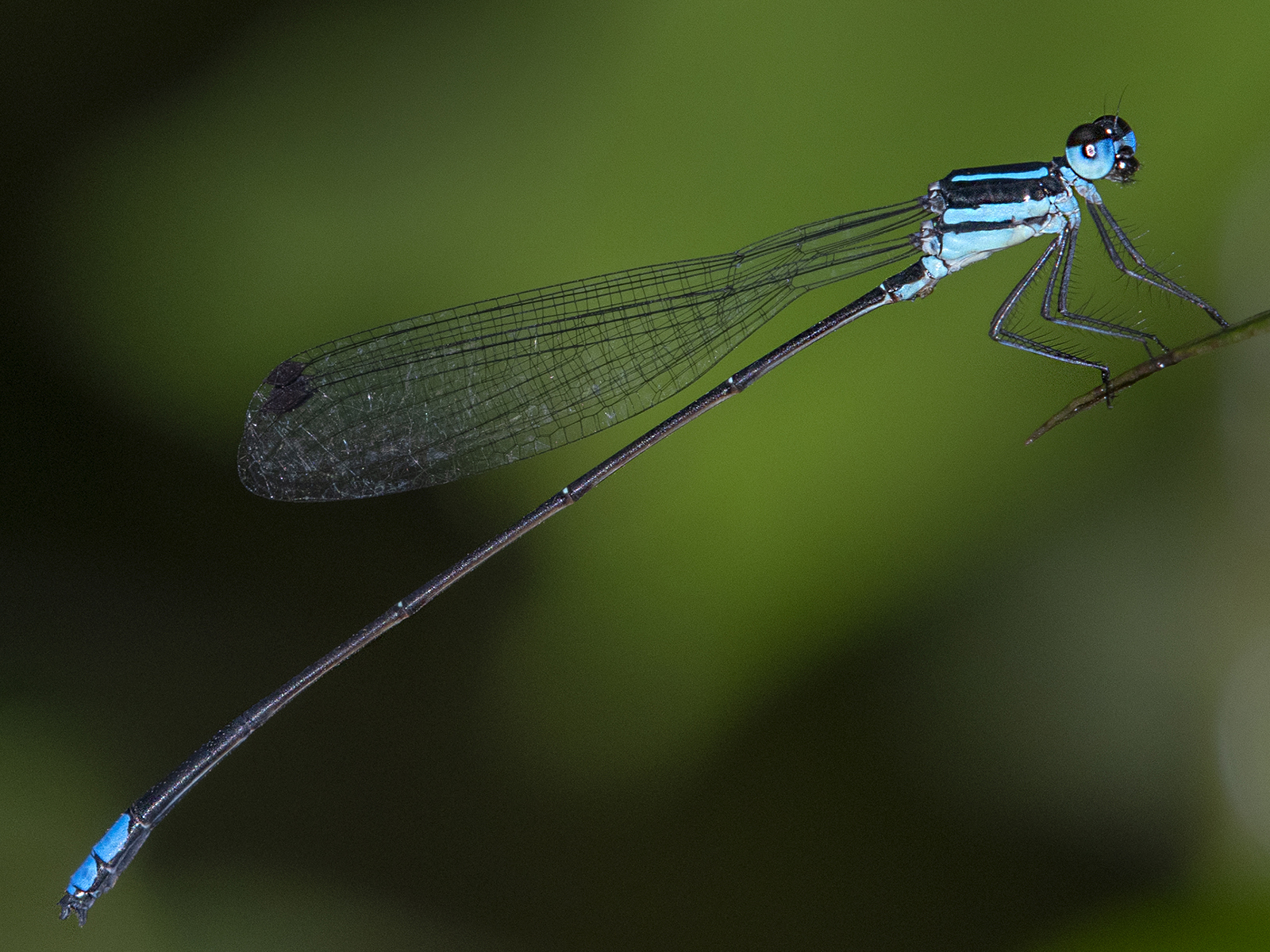
- Male

Conservation status
- Near Threatened (IUCN 3.1)

Scientific classification
- Kingdom: Animalia
- Phylum: Arthropoda
- Clade: Pancrustacea
- Class: Insecta
- Order: Odonata
- Suborder: Zygoptera
- Family: Platycnemididae
- Subfamily: Disparoneurinae
- Genus: Melanoneura
- Species: M. bilineata

Binomial name
- Melanoneura bilineata Fraser, 1922

= Melanoneura bilineata =

Species of insect

Melanoneura bilineata is damselfly in the family Platycnemididae. It is endemic to Western Ghats in India, restricted to Kodagu and Wayanad districts.

== Description and habitat ==
It is a medium-sized damselfly with black-capped blue eyes. Its thorax is black, marked with a narrow ante-humeral azure blue stripe and two broad blue stripes on the sides. Its abdomen is black, marked with azure blue broadly on the sides of the segments 1 and 2. Segments 3 to 6 are marked with tiny basal annules. Segments 8 to 10 are blue, marked with very narrow basal black rings. Female is similar to the male; but only matured adult has the blue marks. Others are marked with yellow or bluish-green.

It is similar to Caconeura ramburi; but can be distinguished by the absence of blue basal annules which is very broadly visible in C. ramburi.

It is known only from upper catchments of Kaveri river in Kodagu and western slopes of Wayanad. It is restricted to hill streams with good forest cover.

== See also ==
- List of odonates of India
- List of odonata of Kerala
