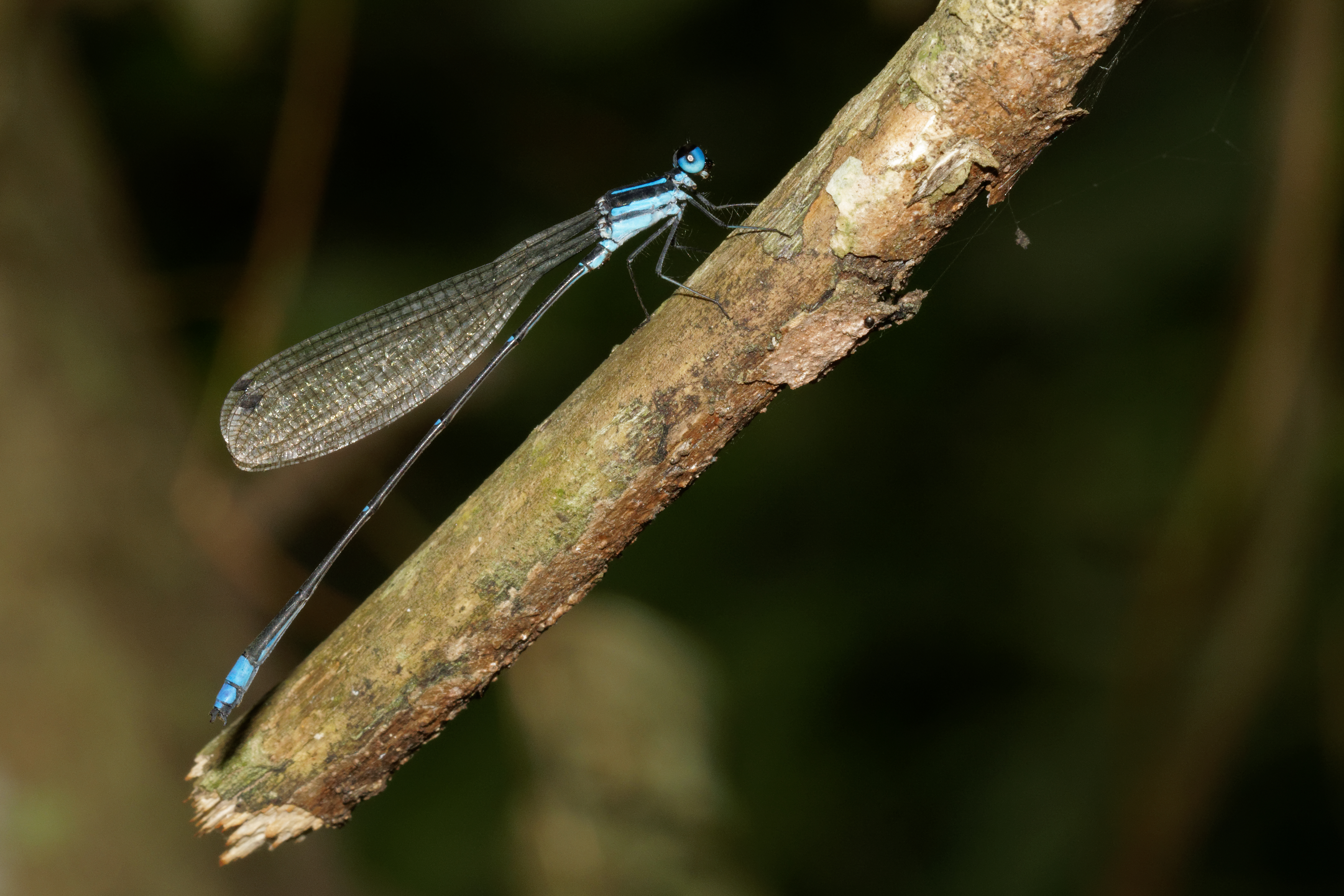
- Male
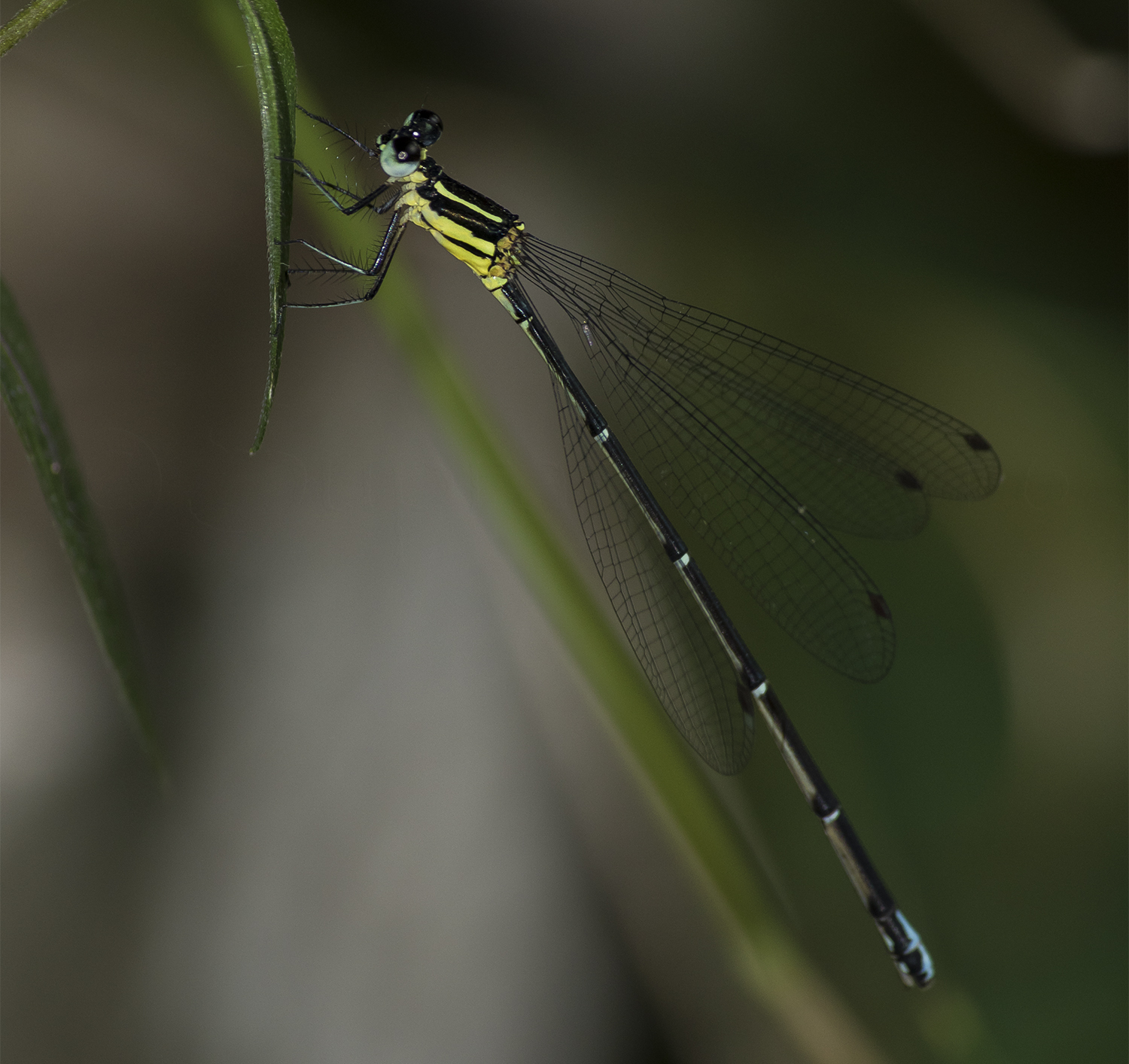
- Female

Conservation status
- Data Deficient (IUCN 3.1)

Scientific classification
- Kingdom: Animalia
- Phylum: Arthropoda
- Clade: Pancrustacea
- Class: Insecta
- Order: Odonata
- Suborder: Zygoptera
- Family: Platycnemididae
- Genus: Caconeura
- Species: C. ramburi

Binomial name
- Caconeura ramburi (Fraser, 1922)

Synonyms
- Indoneura ramburi Fraser, 1922

= Caconeura ramburi =

Species of damselfly

Caconeura ramburi is a damselfly species in the family Platycnemididae. It is commonly known as the Coorg Bambootail or Indian blue bambootail. It is endemic to the Western Ghats.

== Description and habitat ==
It is a medium-sized damselfly with black-capped blue eyes. Its thorax is black on dorsum and azure blue on the sides. There is a very narrow azure blue antehumeral stripe and a narrow black stripe on the postero-lateral suture on each side. Wings are transparent with black, diamond shaped pterostigma. Abdomen is black with azure blue stripes on segment 1 and 2. Segment 3 to 7 have broad basal rings in azure blue. Segments 8 to 10 are azure blue on dorsum, with black basal annules. The lateral side of segment 10 is black. Female is similar to the male; but the markings more greenish-blue or even yellow, except in very old specimens.

It is larger and more slender insect than Caconeura gomphoides and breeding at a lower altitude. The broad blue basal annules will help to distinguish it. The larger size, differently shaped pterostigma, the absence of a ventral spine on the base of the superior appendages, and the underside of the head entirely black, will help to distinguish it from Caconeura risi.

It breeds in forest streams. Commonly found perched on riparian vegetation along shaded streams.

== See also ==
- List of odonates of India
- List of odonata of Kerala
