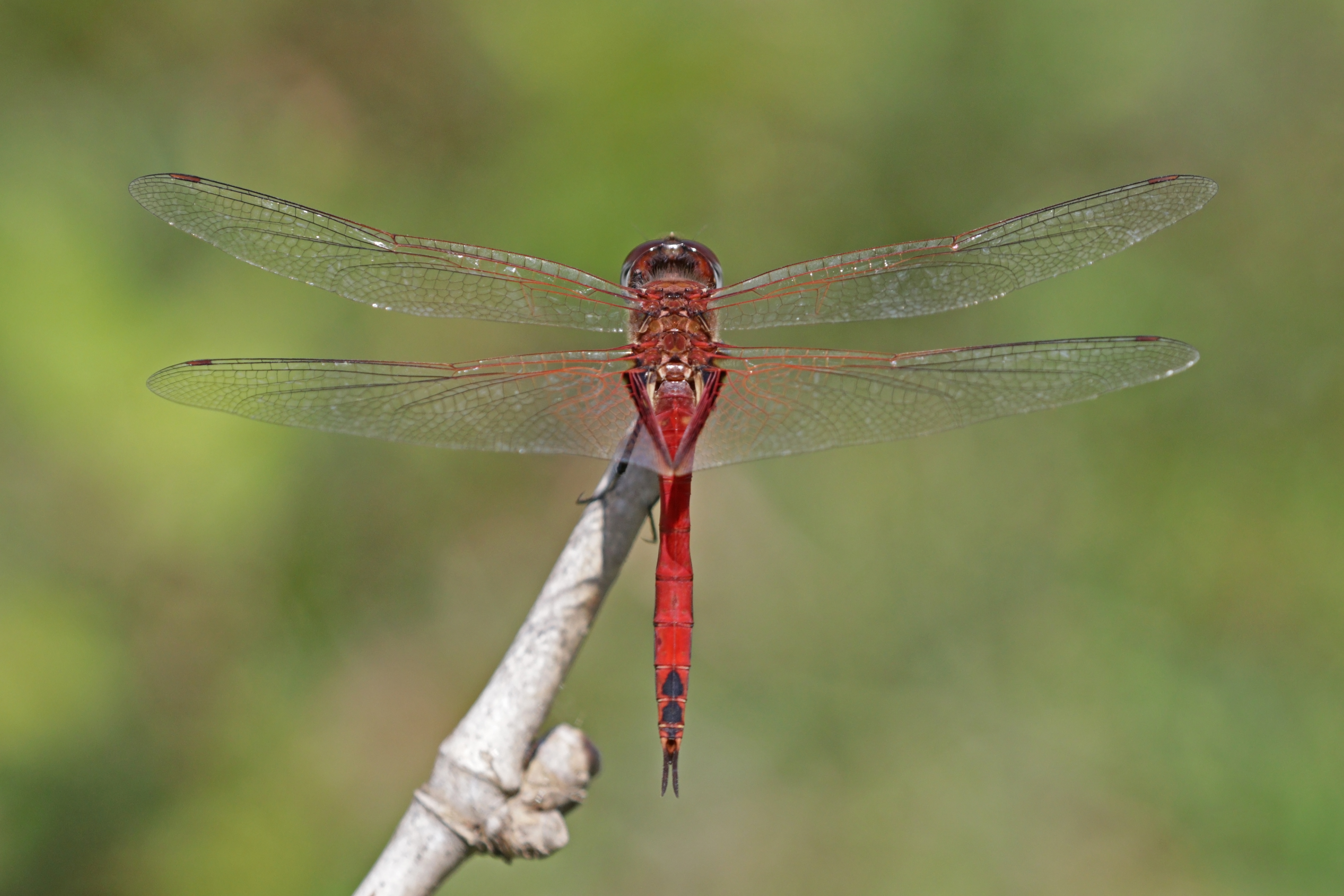
- male, Madagascar
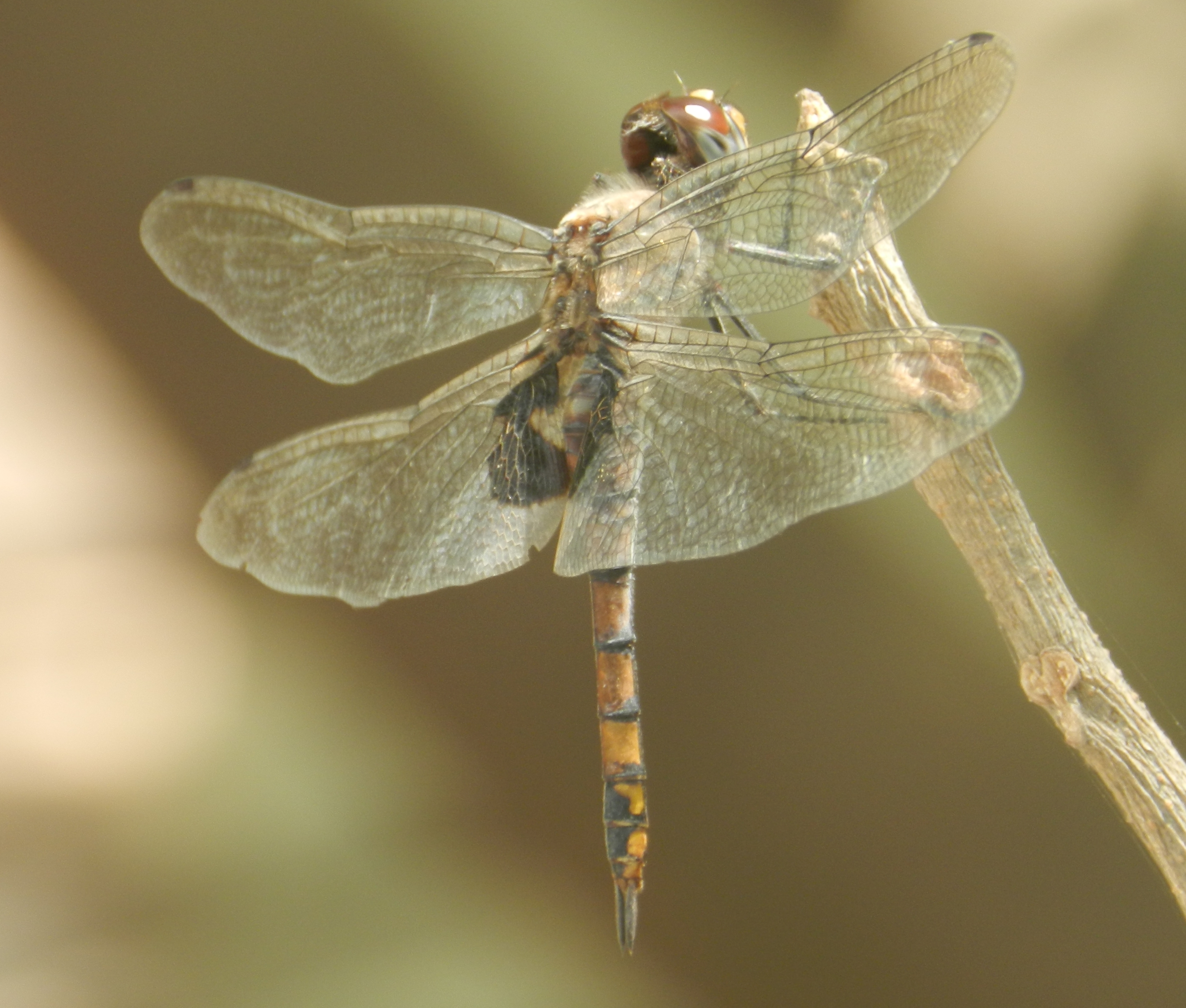
- female

Conservation status
- Least Concern (IUCN 3.1)

Scientific classification
- Kingdom: Animalia
- Phylum: Arthropoda
- Class: Insecta
- Order: Odonata
- Infraorder: Anisoptera
- Family: Libellulidae
- Genus: Tramea
- Species: T. limbata

Binomial name
- Tramea limbata (Desjardins, 1832)

Synonyms
- Libellula incerta Rambur, 1842; Libellula limbata Desjardins, 1832; Libellula mauriciana Rambur, 1842; Libellula similata Rambur, 1842; Libellula stylata Rambur, 1842; Tramea continentalis Selys, 1878; Tramea madagascariensis Kirby, 1889; Tramea translucida Kirby, 1889; Trapezostigma continentale Selys, 1878; Trapezostigma limbatum (Desjardins, 1832)

= Tramea limbata =

Species of dragonfly

Tramea limbata is a species of dragonfly in the family Libellulidae. Its common names include black marsh trotter, ferruginous glider and voyaging glider.

== Distribution ==
This migrant is widespread in sub-Saharan Africa, including Madagascar, southern Arabian Peninsula, southern Asia and nearby islands.

== Description and habitat ==
It is a medium-sized red dragonfly with extremely long anal appendages. It can be distinguished from other species of this genus by the dark-brown hind-wing patch, not surrounded by a golden yellow areola, in the base. Female is similar to male; but may be red as the male or yellowish in color.

This species reproduces in open pools, ponds and in grassy marshes. Adults are often found in bushy areas and around woodlands around them. This dragonfly is commonly seen patrolling over water bodies and open space in sunny days. Pairs in copula or in tandem can also sometimes be seen flying low above water bodies.

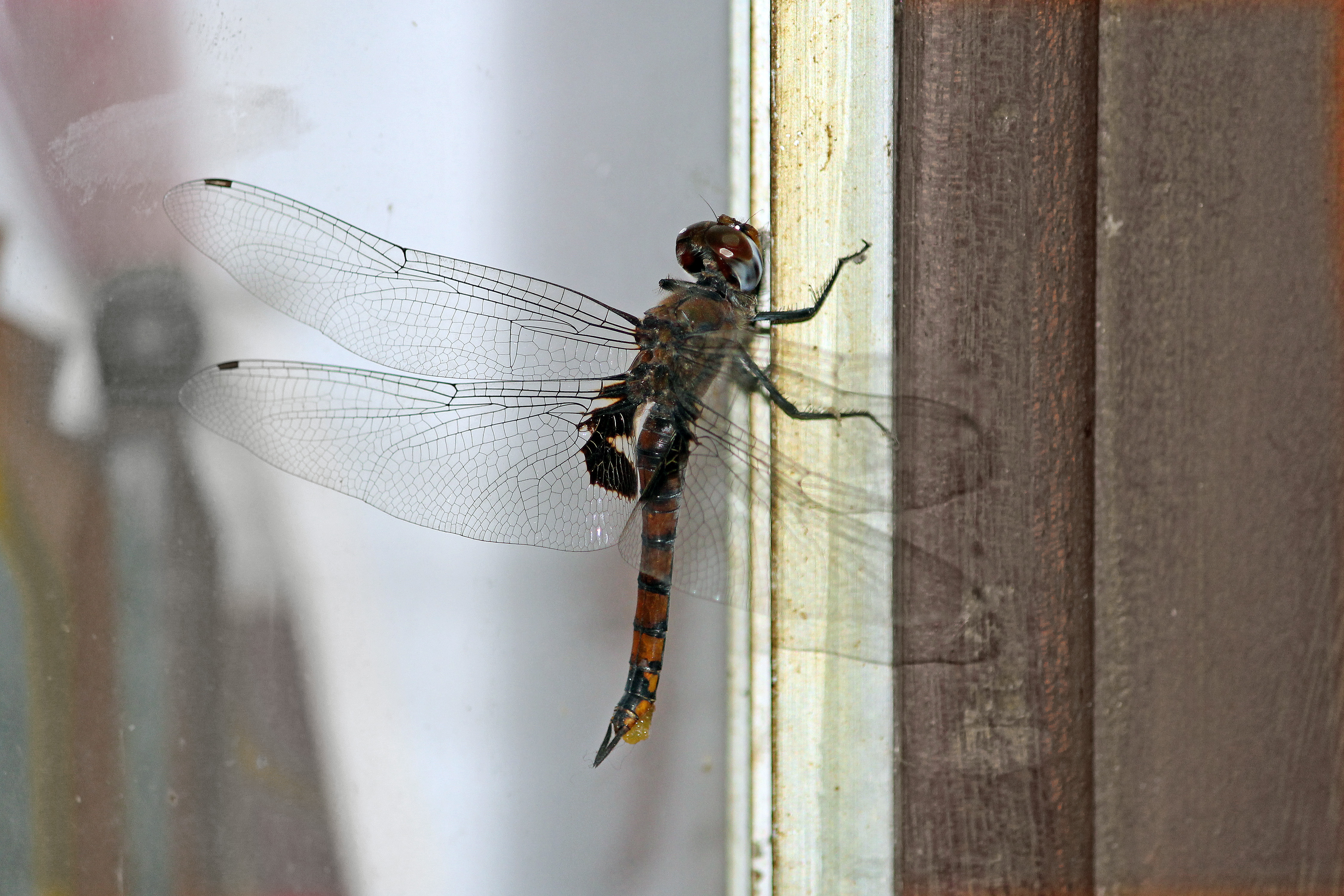
Female

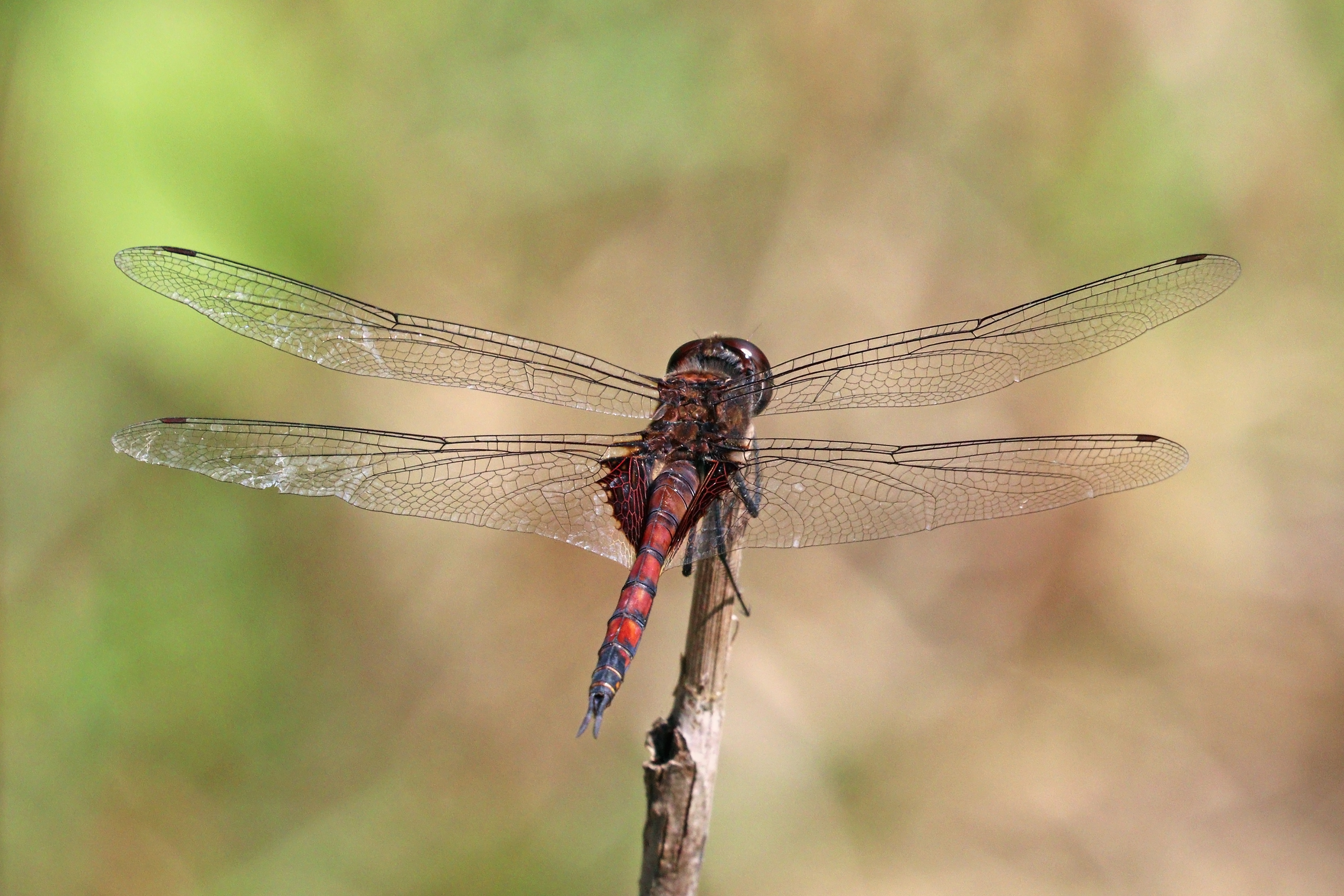
male, India

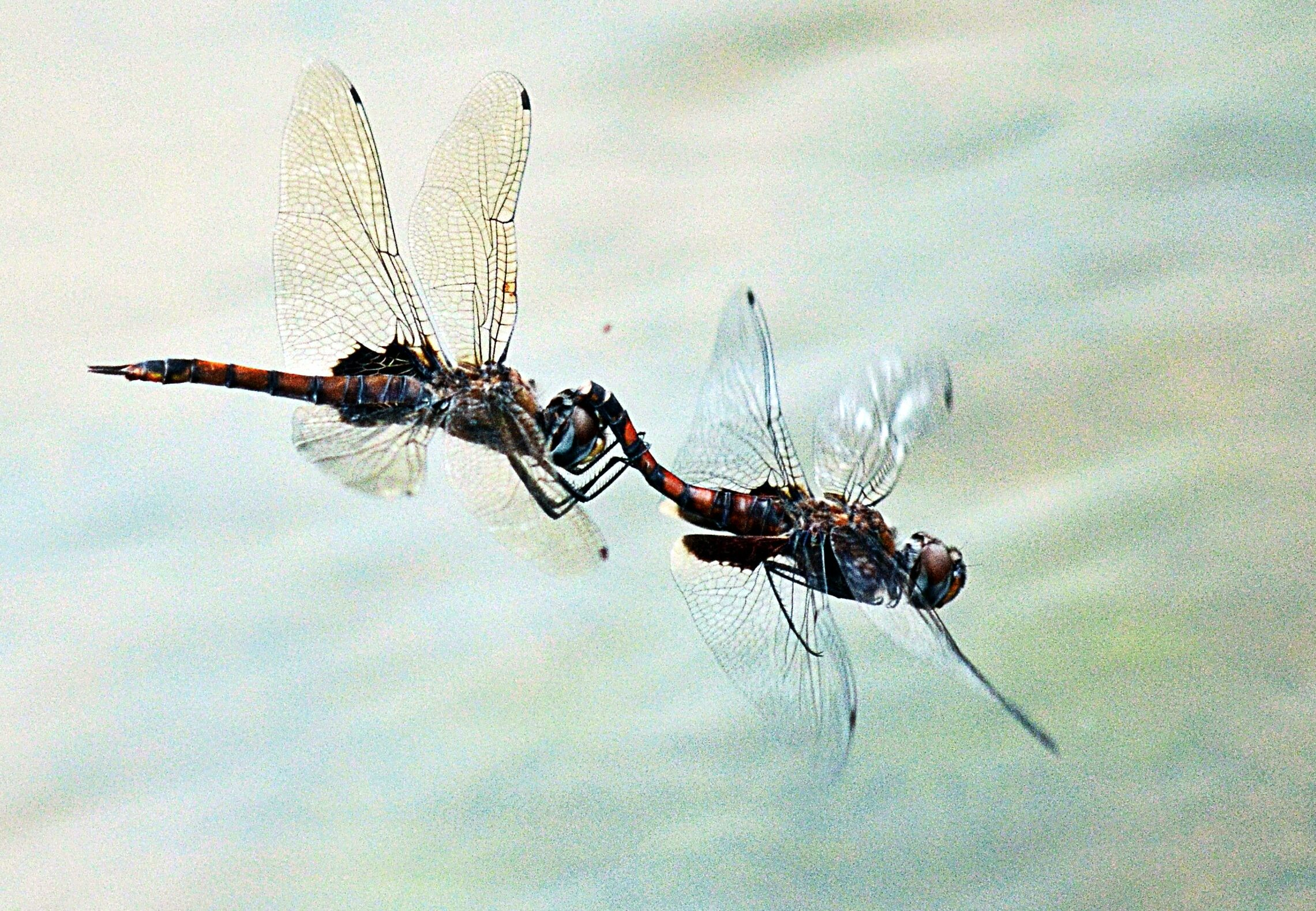
Pair in tandem flying over water bodies

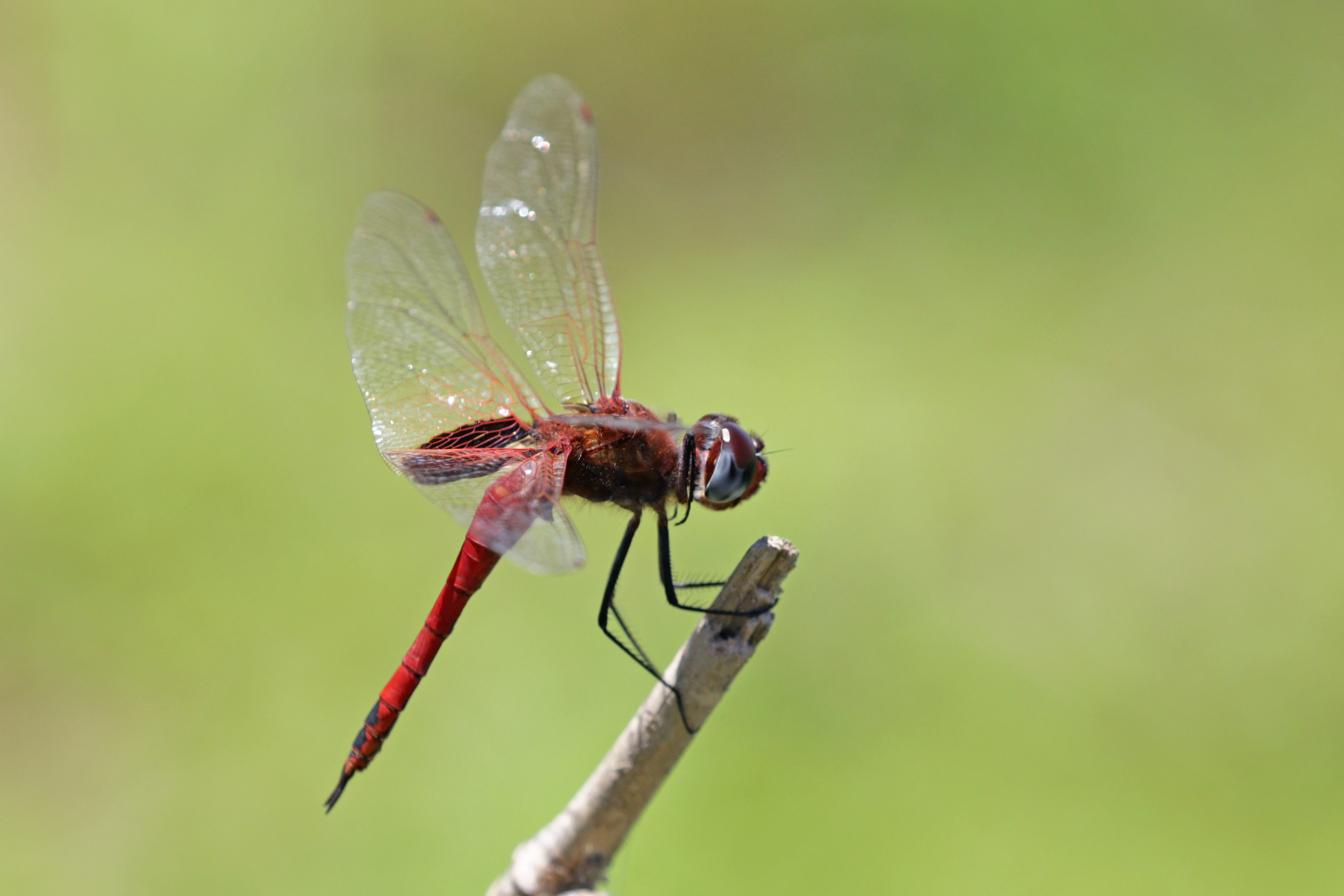
male, Madagascar

== See also ==
- List of odonates of Sri Lanka
- List of odonates of India
- List of odonata of Kerala
