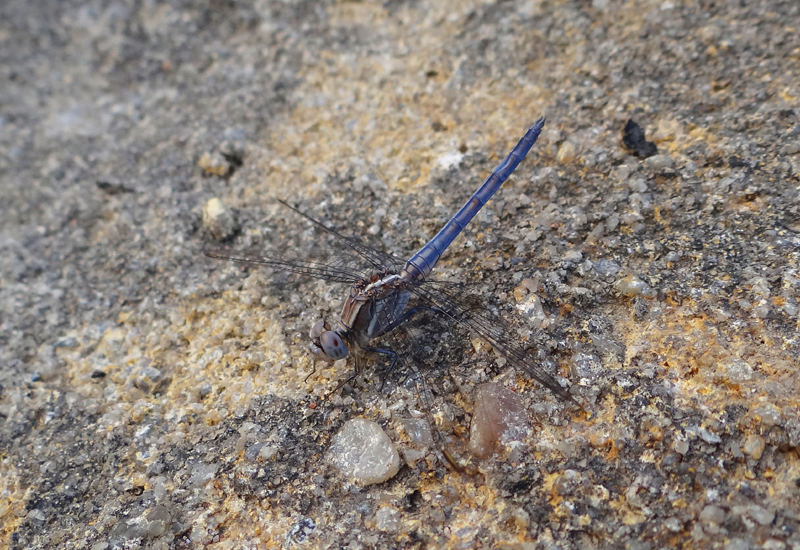
- Male
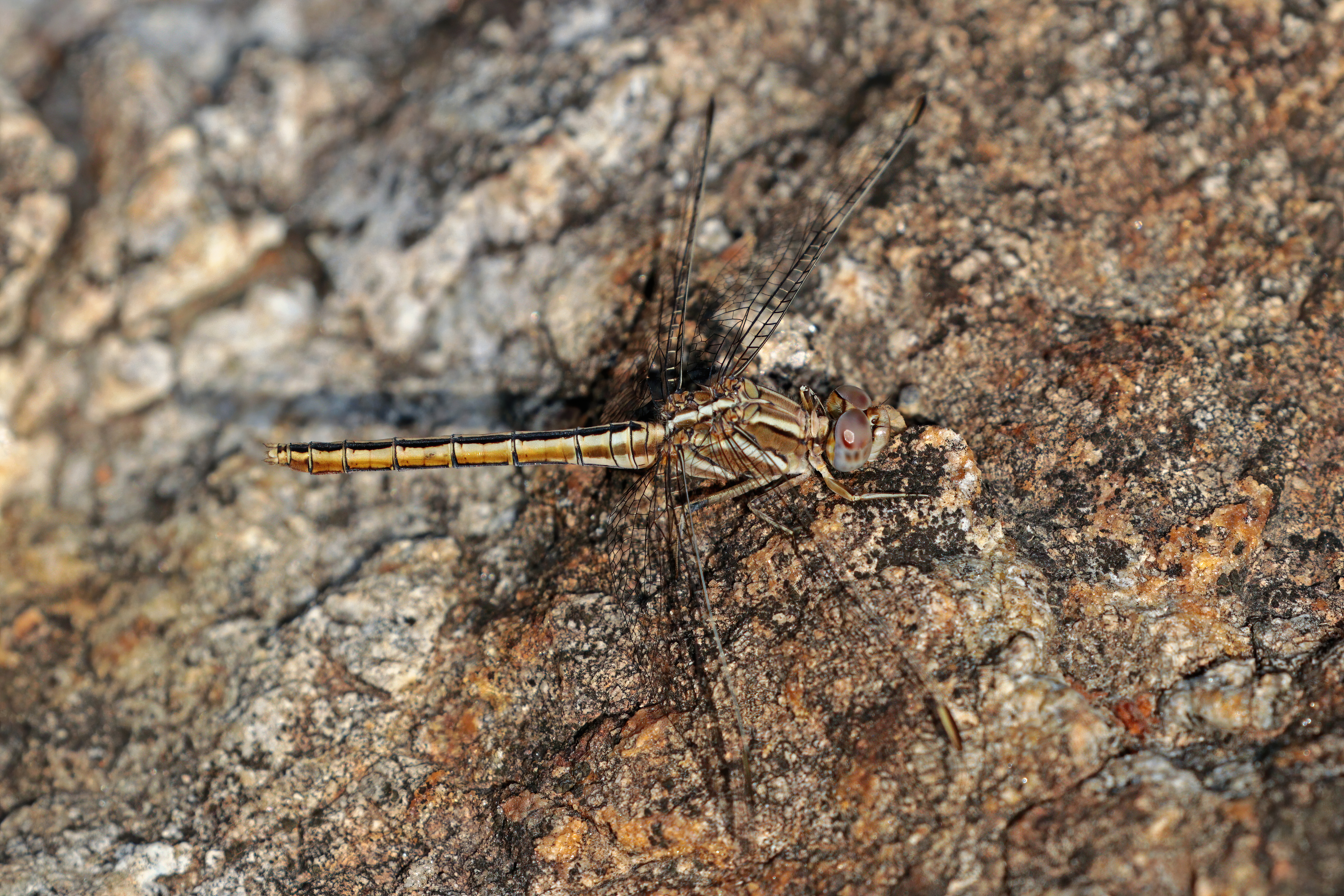
- Female

Conservation status
- Least Concern (IUCN 3.1)

Scientific classification
- Kingdom: Animalia
- Phylum: Arthropoda
- Clade: Pancrustacea
- Class: Insecta
- Order: Odonata
- Infraorder: Anisoptera
- Family: Libellulidae
- Genus: Orthetrum
- Species: O. taeniolatum

Binomial name
- Orthetrum taeniolatum (Schneider, 1845)

Synonyms
- Libellula taeniolata Schneider, 1845; Orthetrum brevistylum Kirby, 1896; Orthetrum garhwalicum Singh & Baijal, 1954; Orthetrum hyalianum Kirby, 1886

= Orthetrum taeniolatum =

Species of dragonfly

Orthetrum taeniolatum is an Asian freshwater dragonfly species. The common name for this species is small skimmer. Its range of distribution spreads from eastern Europe to China, and the species itself is locally common throughout the range.

== Description and habitat ==
It is a medium-sized dragonfly with brown capped eyes, greenish brown thorax and bluish abdomen. Female lacks the powder blue pruinescence. It prefers medium to slow-flowing streams in the dry zones and hot plains. Adults are common around open rocky and sandy beds of the streams.

== See also ==
- List of odonates of Sri Lanka
- List of odonates of India
- List of odonata of Kerala
