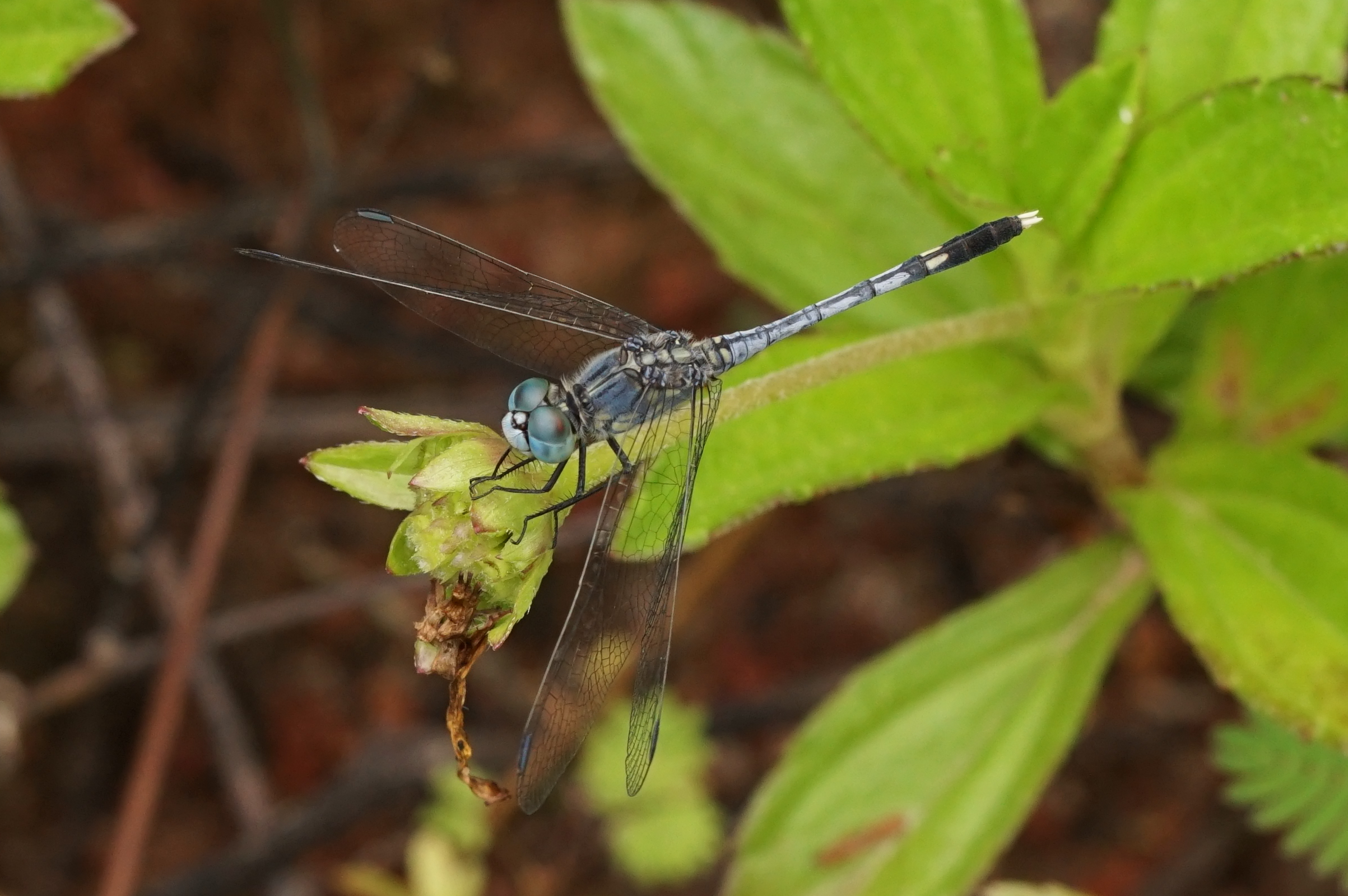
- Male
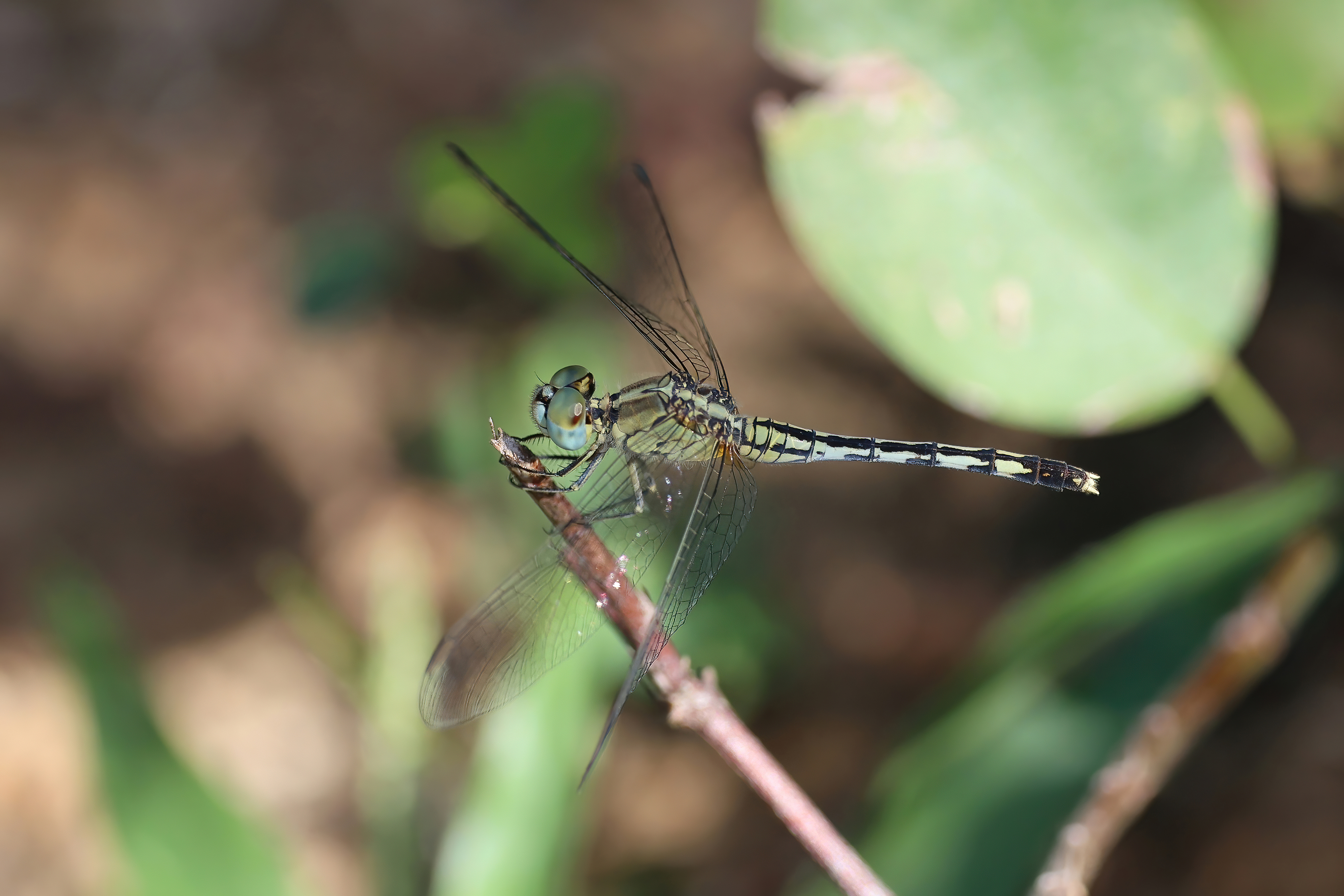
- Female

Conservation status
- Least Concern (IUCN 3.1)

Scientific classification
- Kingdom: Animalia
- Phylum: Arthropoda
- Clade: Pancrustacea
- Class: Insecta
- Order: Odonata
- Suborder: Anisoptera
- Superfamily: Libelluloidea
- Family: Libellulidae
- Genus: Diplacodes
- Species: D. trivialis

Binomial name
- Diplacodes trivialis (Rambur, 1842)

Synonyms
- Libellula trivialis Rambur, 1842; Libellula phalerata Uhler, 1858; Diplacodes remota Ris, 1911

= Diplacodes trivialis =

Species of dragonfly

Diplacodes trivialis is a species of dragonfly in the family Libellulidae known as the chalky percher or ground skimmer. It is found in Seychelles, Oman, United Arab Emirates, China, Japan, India, Maldives and southwards to New Guinea and Australia.

== Description and habitat ==
Diplacodes trivialis is small dragonfly with bluish eyes and greenish-yellow or olivaceous thorax and abdomen with black marks. In very old adults, the whole thorax and abdomen become uniform pruinosed blue. Clear wings, without apical or basal markings, and the creamy white anal appendages and deep pruinescence in adults help to distinguish this species from others in its genus. It breeds in ponds, wet rice fields, shallow lakes, drainage ditches and similar habitats. It is one of the most common dragonflies in Asia, found in both the plains and hills and in dry and wet areas.

== Etymology ==
The genus name Diplacodes combines Diplax, a genus name derived from the Greek δίς (dis, "twice") and πλάξ (plax, "flat and broad"), with the Greek suffix –ώδης (-ōdēs, "resembling" or "having the nature of"). The name refers to the similarity of the genus to Diplax and Diplacina.

The species name trivialis is Latin for "common" or "ordinary", likely referring to the species being one of the most common dragonflies found in India, where the original specimens were collected.

== Gallery ==
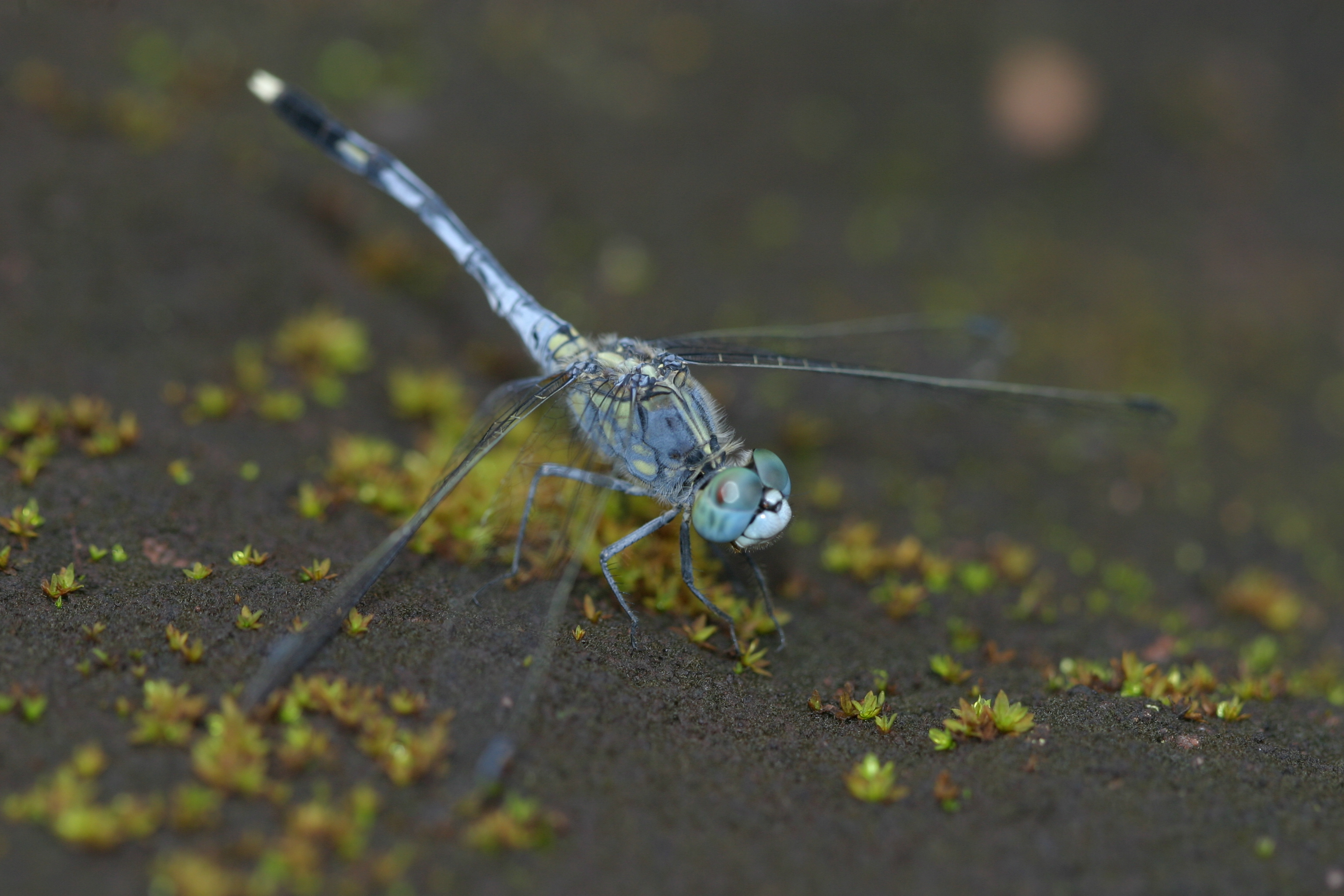
Adult male Female on a rock (young)

Female

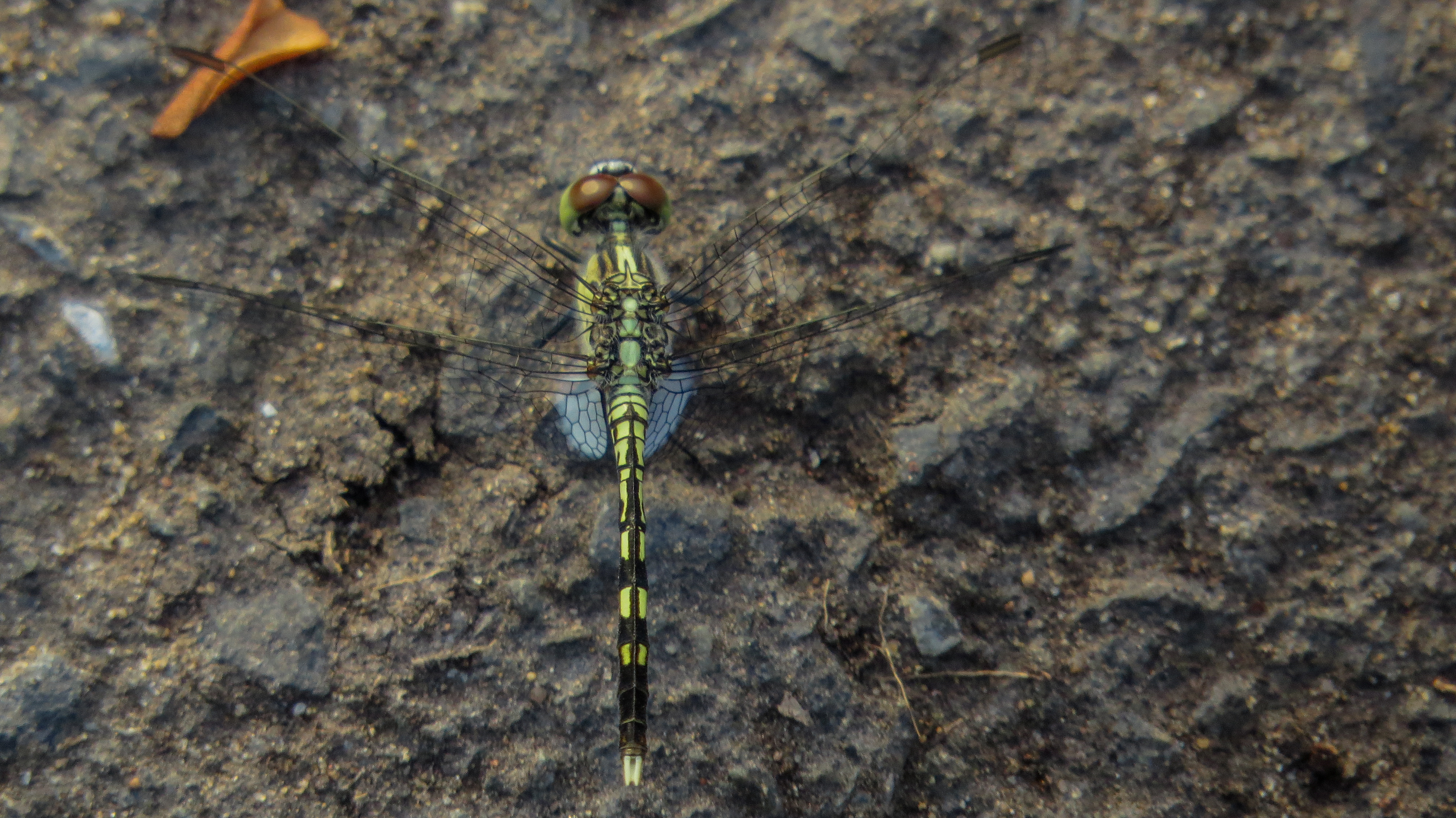
Young male without pruinescence showing the white patch at the base of his hindwings

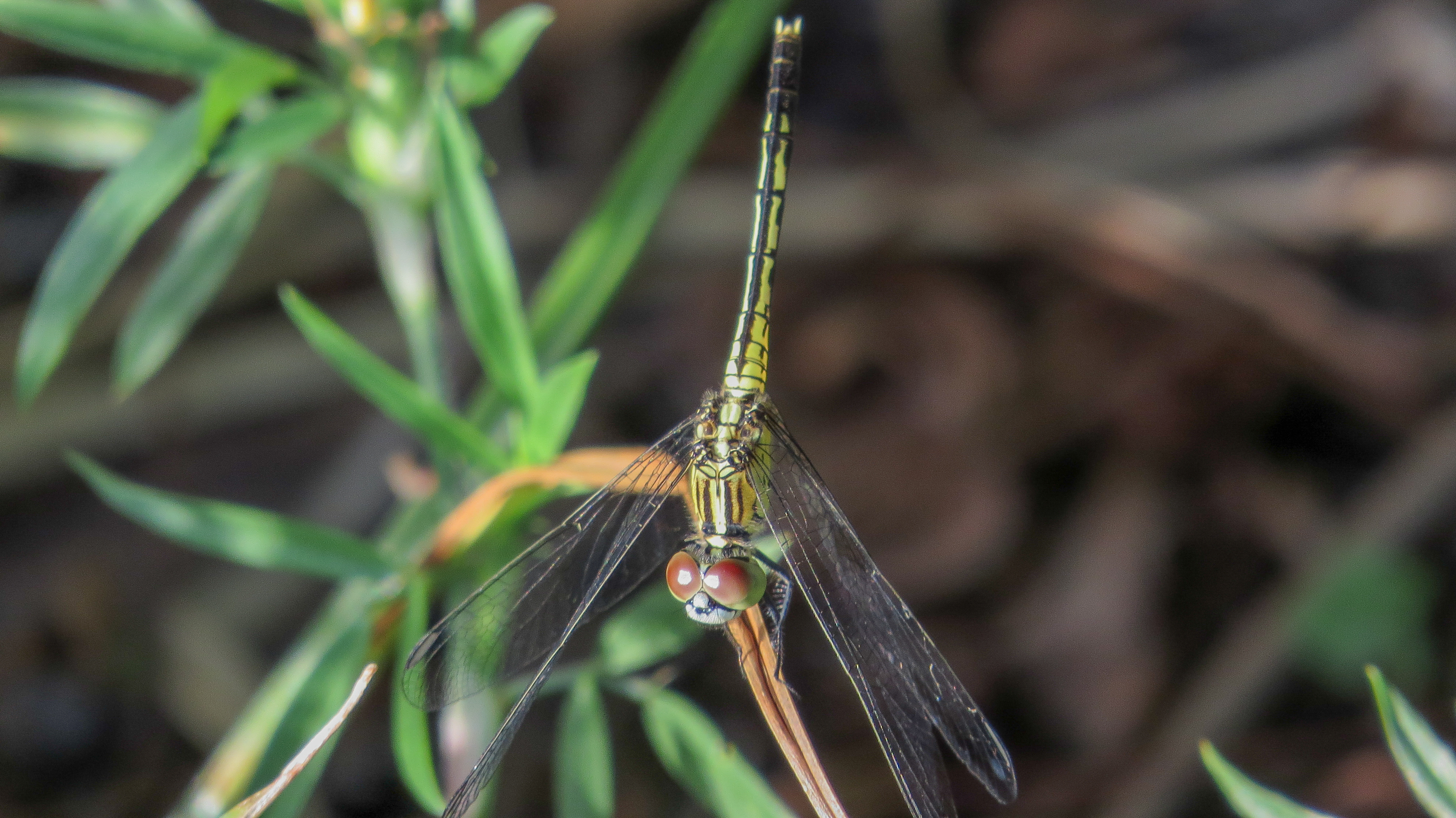
Female without pruinescence

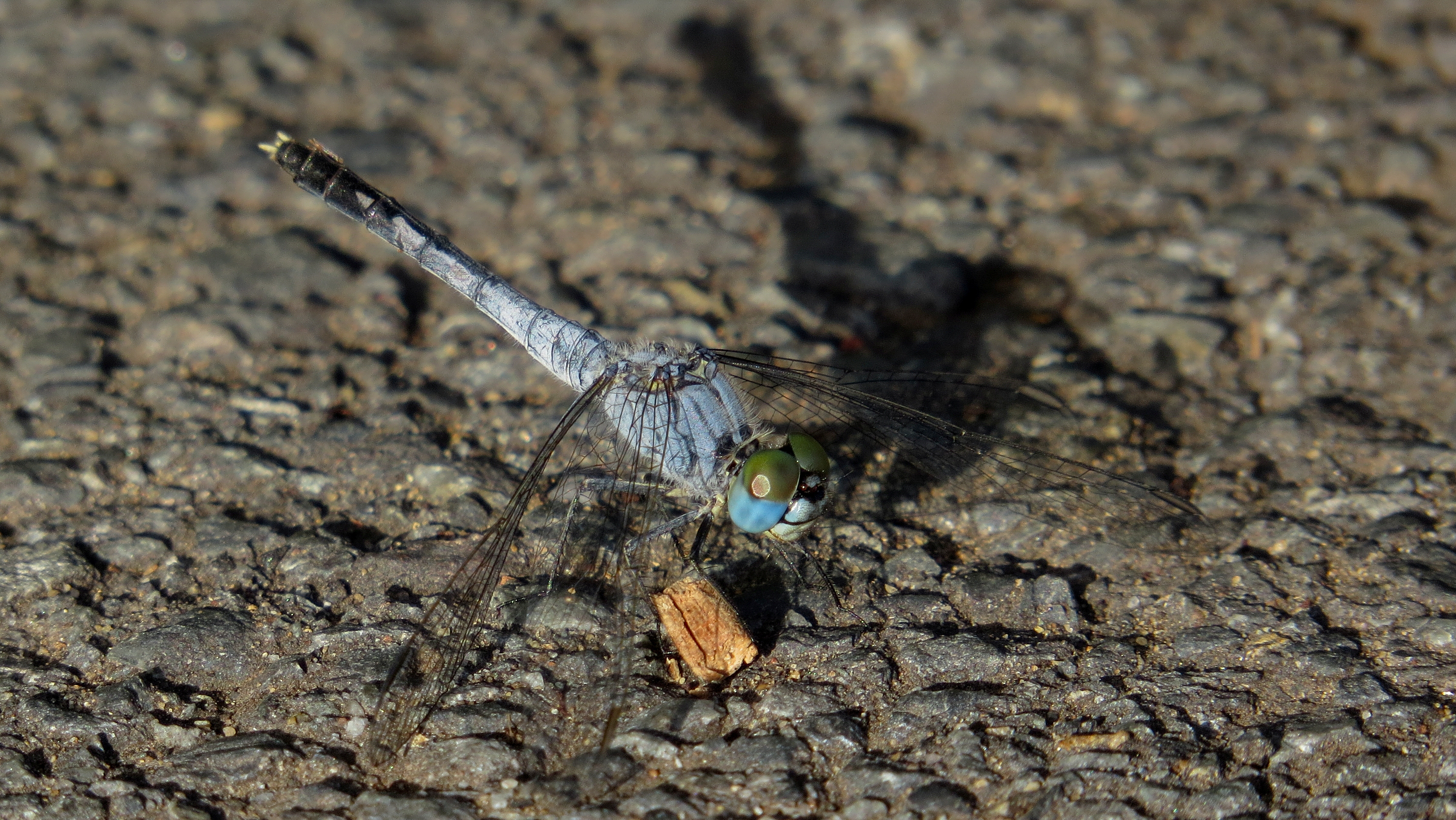
Female with pruinescence

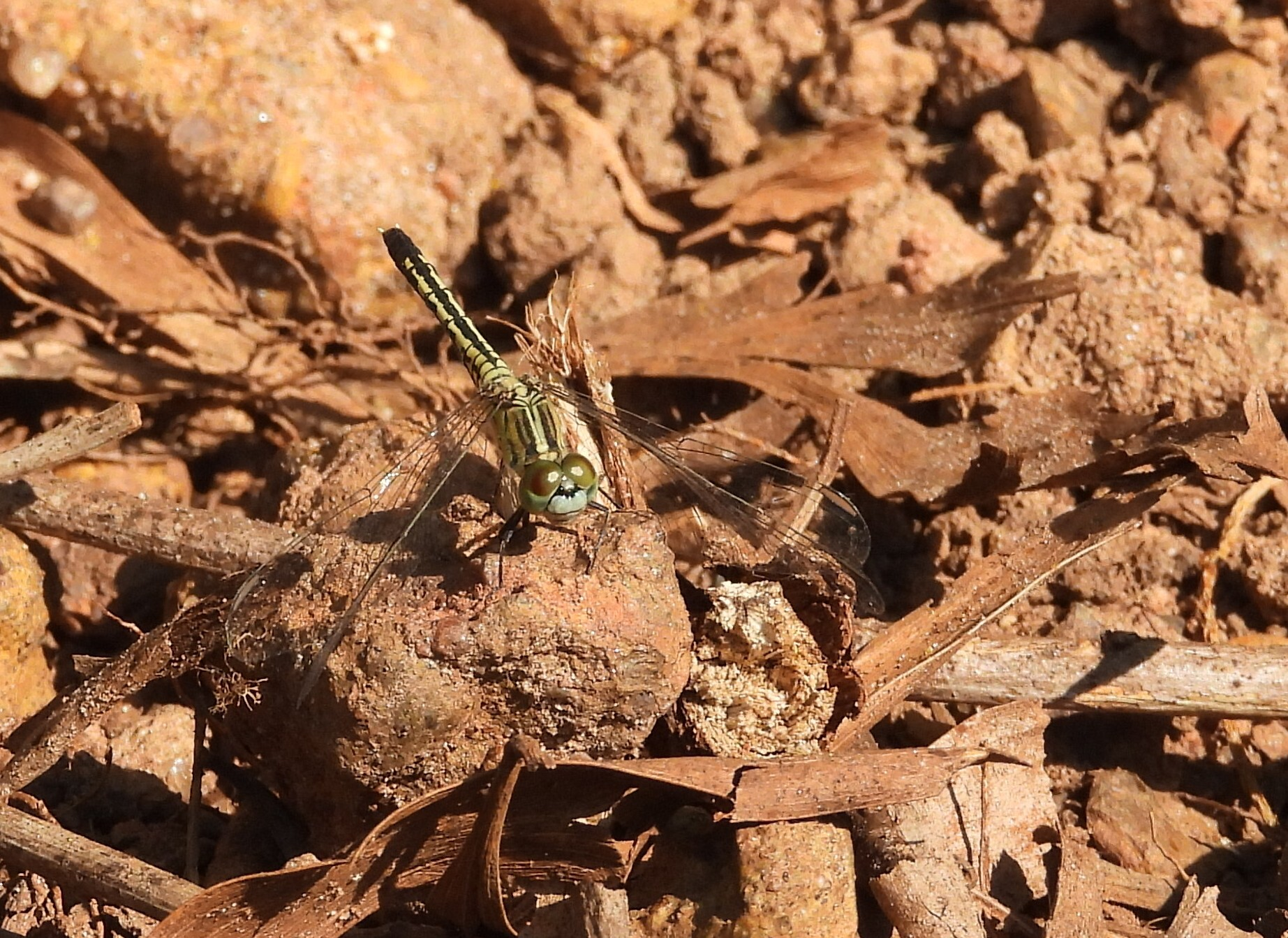
Female

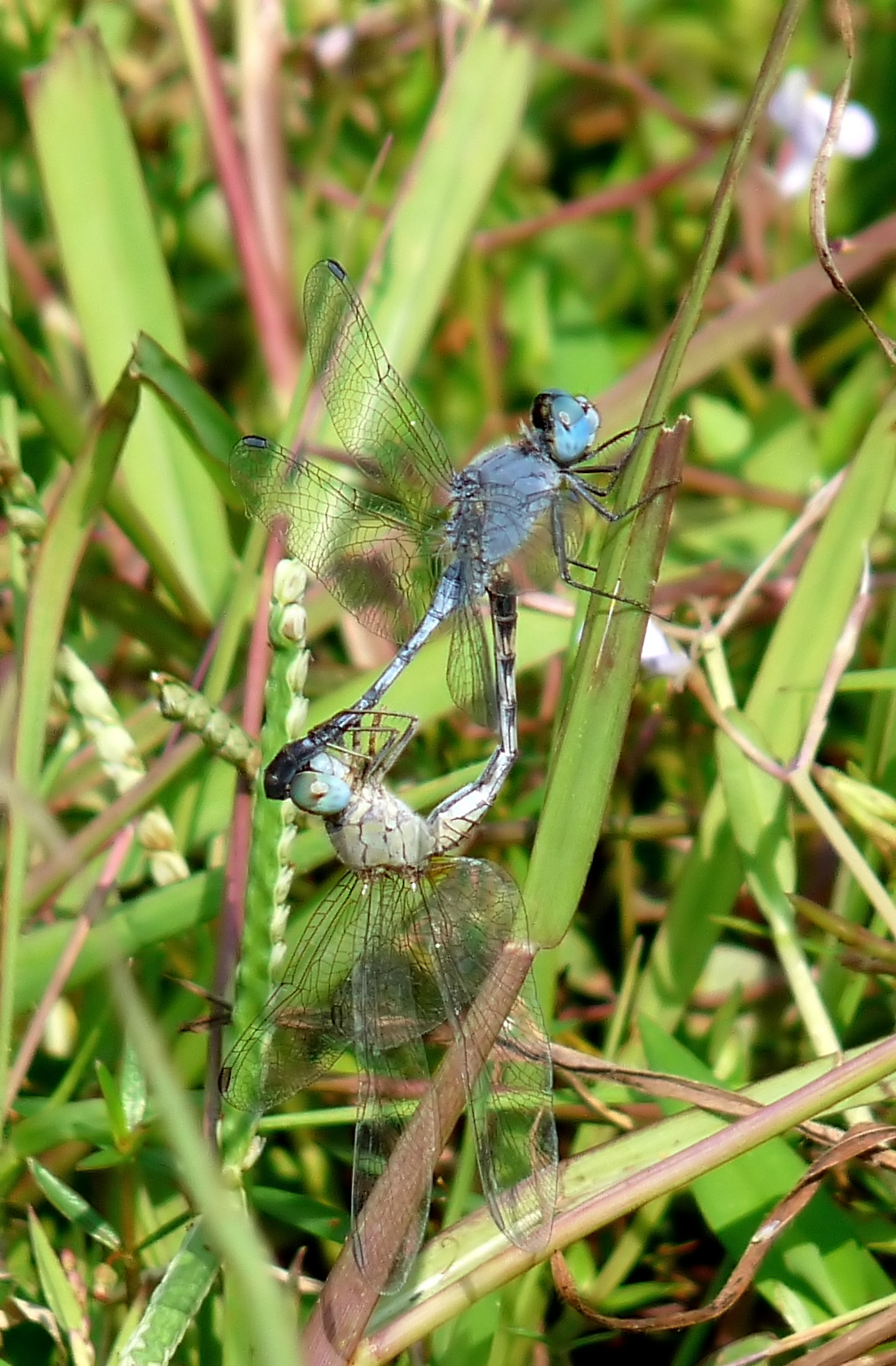
Mating

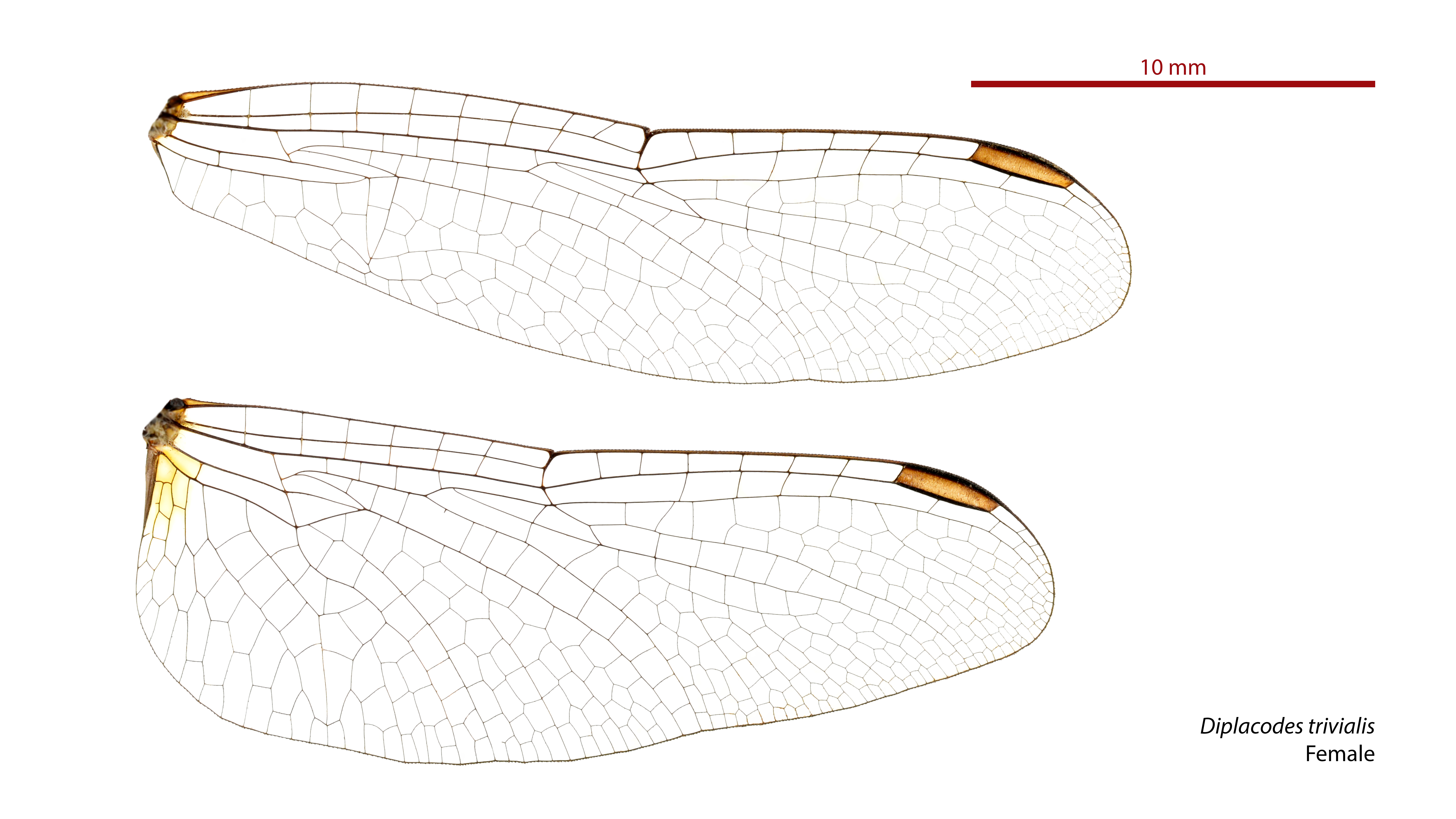
Female wings

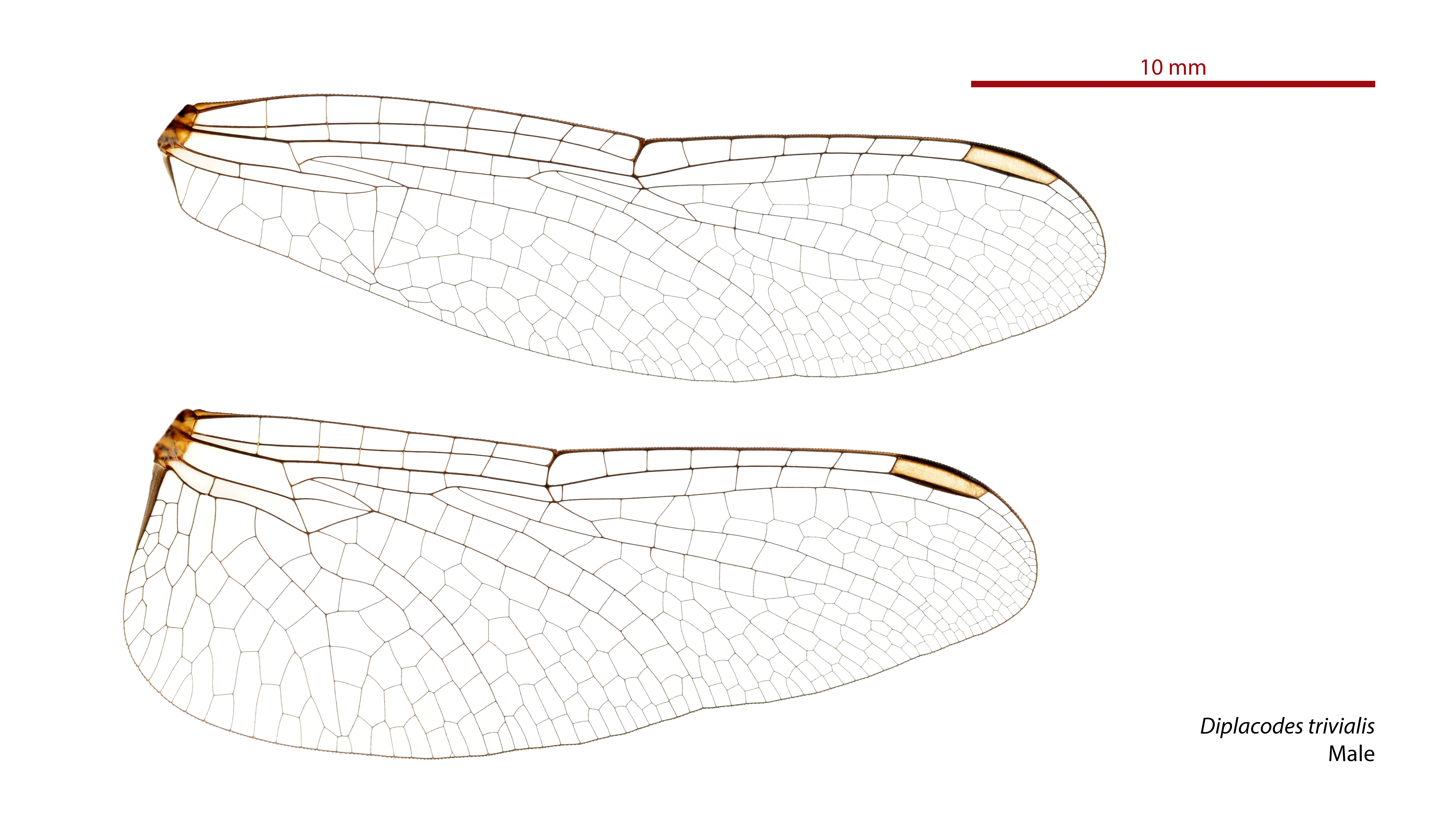
Male wings

== See also ==
- List of odonates of Sri Lanka
- List of odonates of India
- List of odonata of Kerala
- List of Odonata species of Australia
