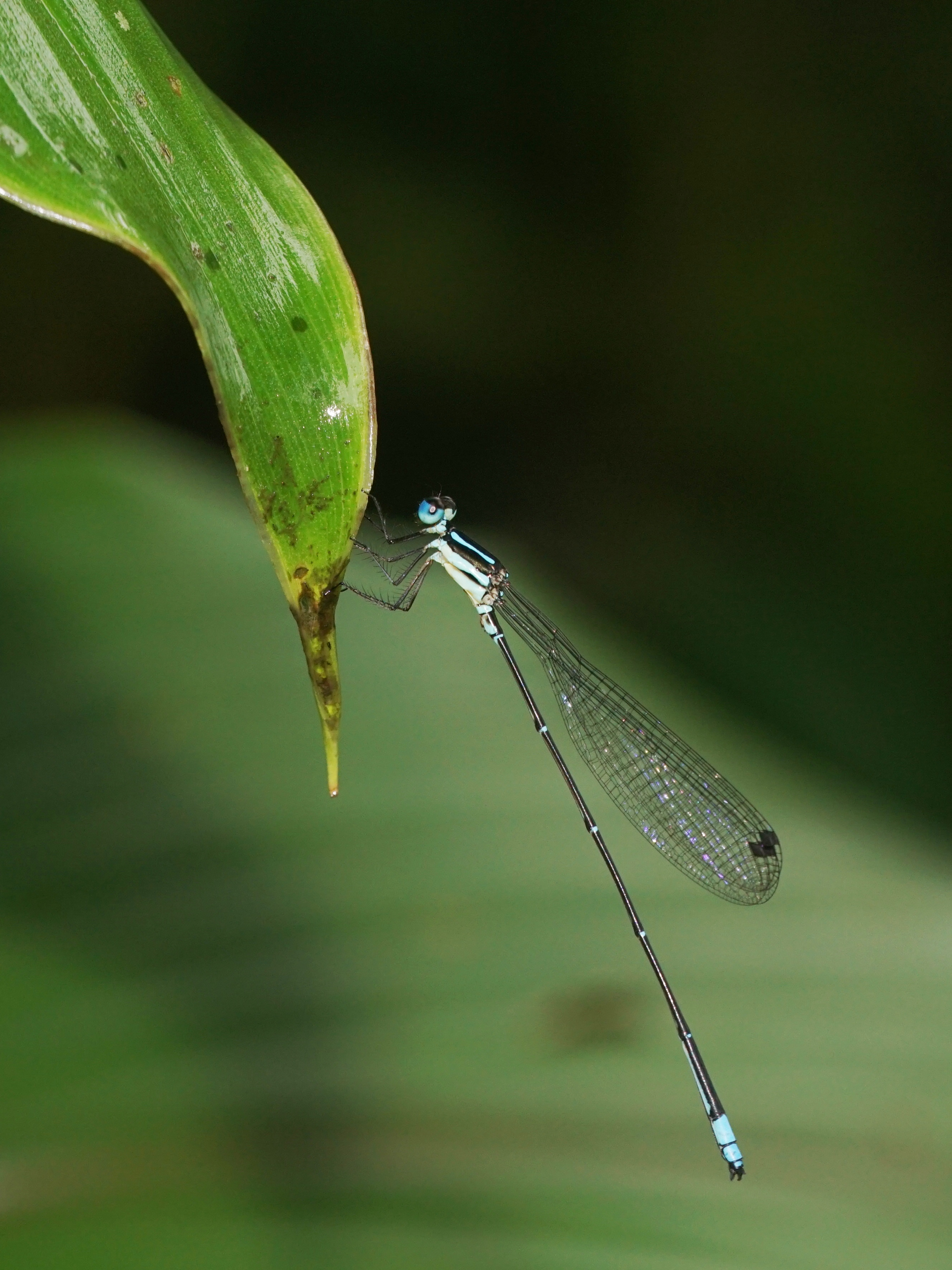
- Male

Conservation status
- Data Deficient (IUCN 3.1)

Scientific classification
- Kingdom: Animalia
- Phylum: Arthropoda
- Clade: Pancrustacea
- Class: Insecta
- Order: Odonata
- Suborder: Zygoptera
- Family: Platycnemididae
- Genus: Caconeura
- Species: C. risi

Binomial name
- Caconeura risi (Fraser, 1931)

Synonyms
- Indoneura risi Fraser, 1931

= Caconeura risi =

Species of damselfly

Caconeura risi is a damselfly species in the family Platycnemididae. It is endemic to Western Ghats.

== Description and habitat ==
It is a medium sized damselfly with black-capped blue eyes. Its thorax is black on dorsum and there are a pair of narrow and slightly curved azure blue antehumeral stripes. Base is azure blue on the sides, marked with a black stripe which occupies half of the posterior border of the thorax. Wings are transparent with black, quadrate shaped pterostigma. Abdomen is black with azure blue marks on segment 1 and 2. Segment 3 to 7 have narrow basal rings in azure blue. Segments 8 to 10 are azure blue on dorsum, with black basal annules. The lateral side of segment 10 is black.

It can be distinguished from other species in this genus by its small size, by having the under surface of the head blue, and by the tiny spine near the base of the superior anal appendages.

It breeds in lowland forest streams. Commonly found perched on riparian vegetation along shaded streams.

== See also ==
- List of odonates of India
- List of odonata of Kerala
