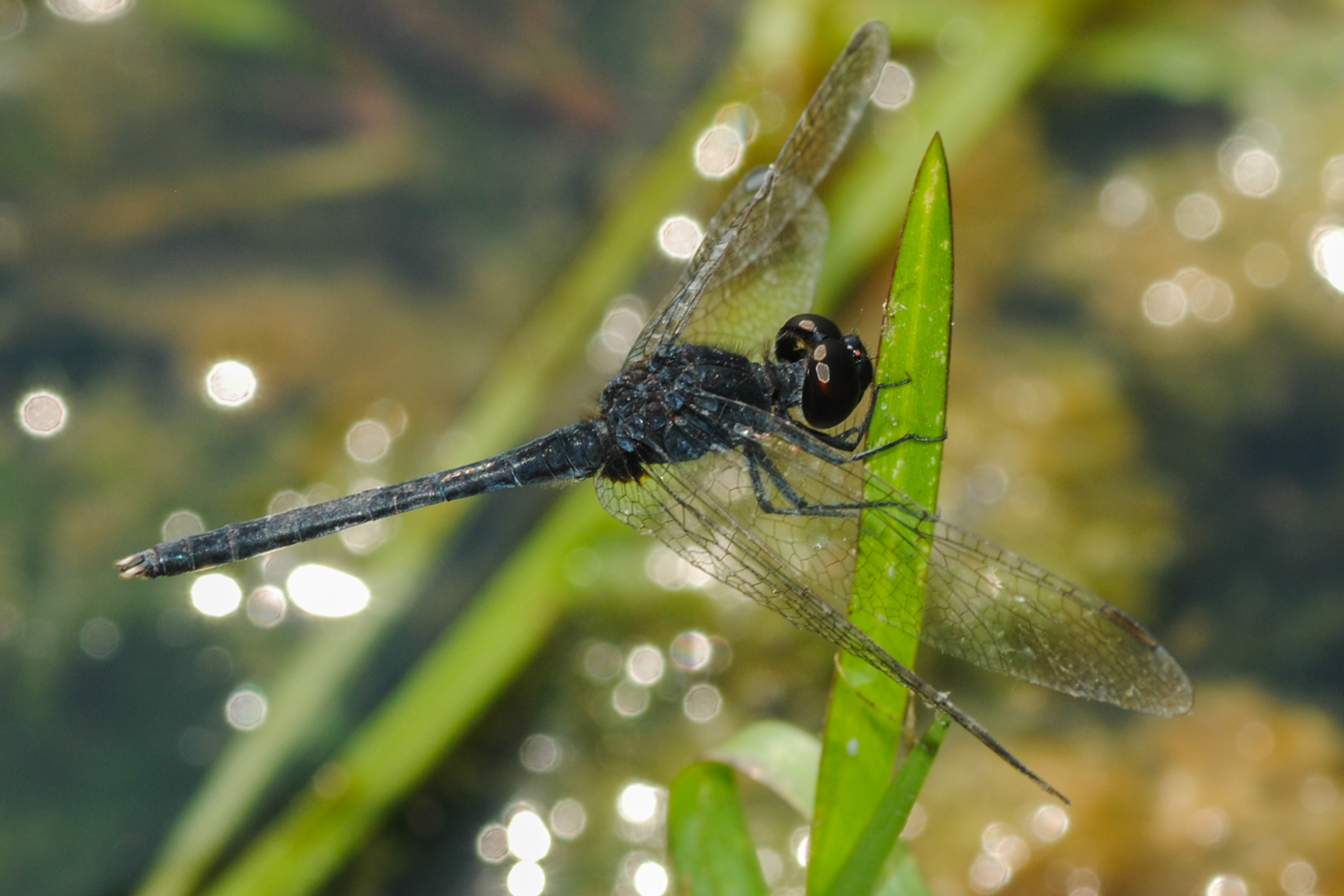
- male

Conservation status
- Least Concern (IUCN 3.1)

Scientific classification
- Kingdom: Animalia
- Phylum: Arthropoda
- Class: Insecta
- Order: Odonata
- Infraorder: Anisoptera
- Family: Libellulidae
- Genus: Diplacodes
- Species: D. lefebvrii

Binomial name
- Diplacodes lefebvrii (Rambur, 1842)

Synonyms
- Diplacodes okavangoensis Pinhey, 1976; Diplacodes lefebvrei (Rambur, 1842); Libellula lefebvrii Rambur, 1842

= Diplacodes lefebvrii =

Species of dragonfly

Diplacodes lefebvrii is a species of dragonfly in the family Libellulidae known commonly as the black percher or black ground skimmer. It is a common species native to most all of Africa and southern Eurasia. It can be found in almost any type of freshwater habitat.

== Description and habitat ==
It is a small dragonfly with eyes dark brown above, violaceous below. Its prothorax, thorax, abdomen, and legs are entirely black in full adults; but in sub-adults, some yellow marks on sides of thorax and yellow spots on segments 4 to 8 in abdomen.

This species is found on open waste lands and freshwater habitats.

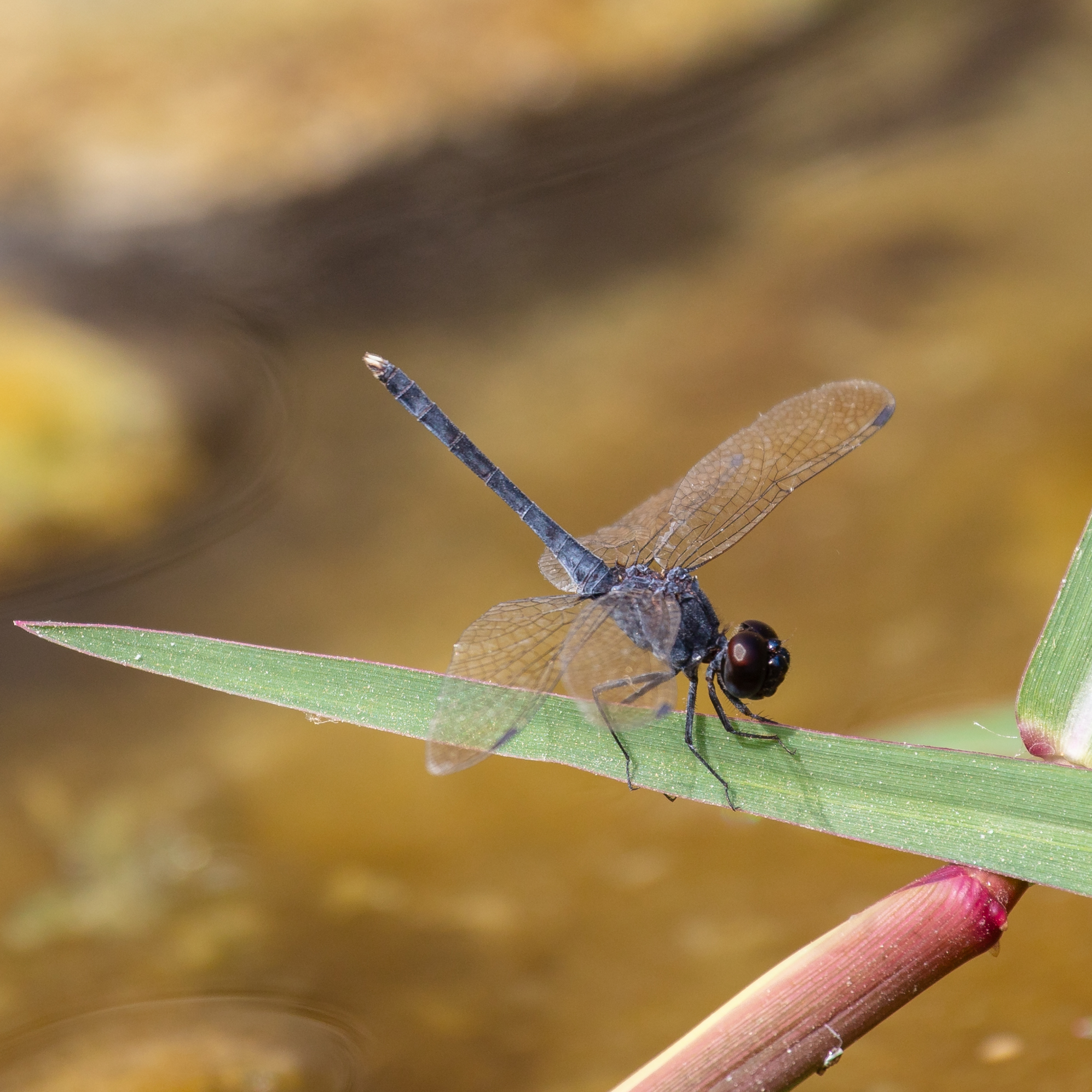
Mature male. The coloration varies regionally and with age.

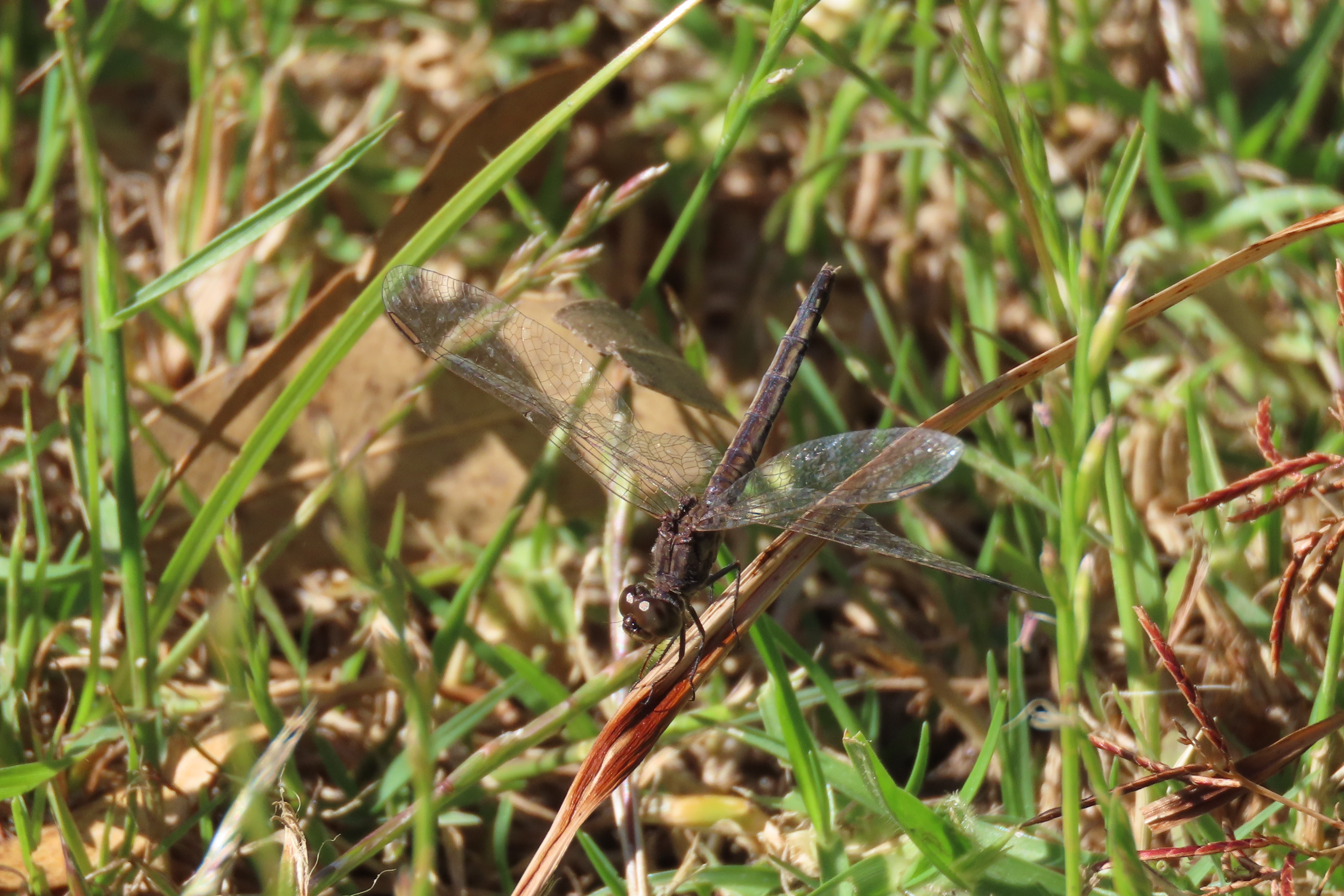
Female

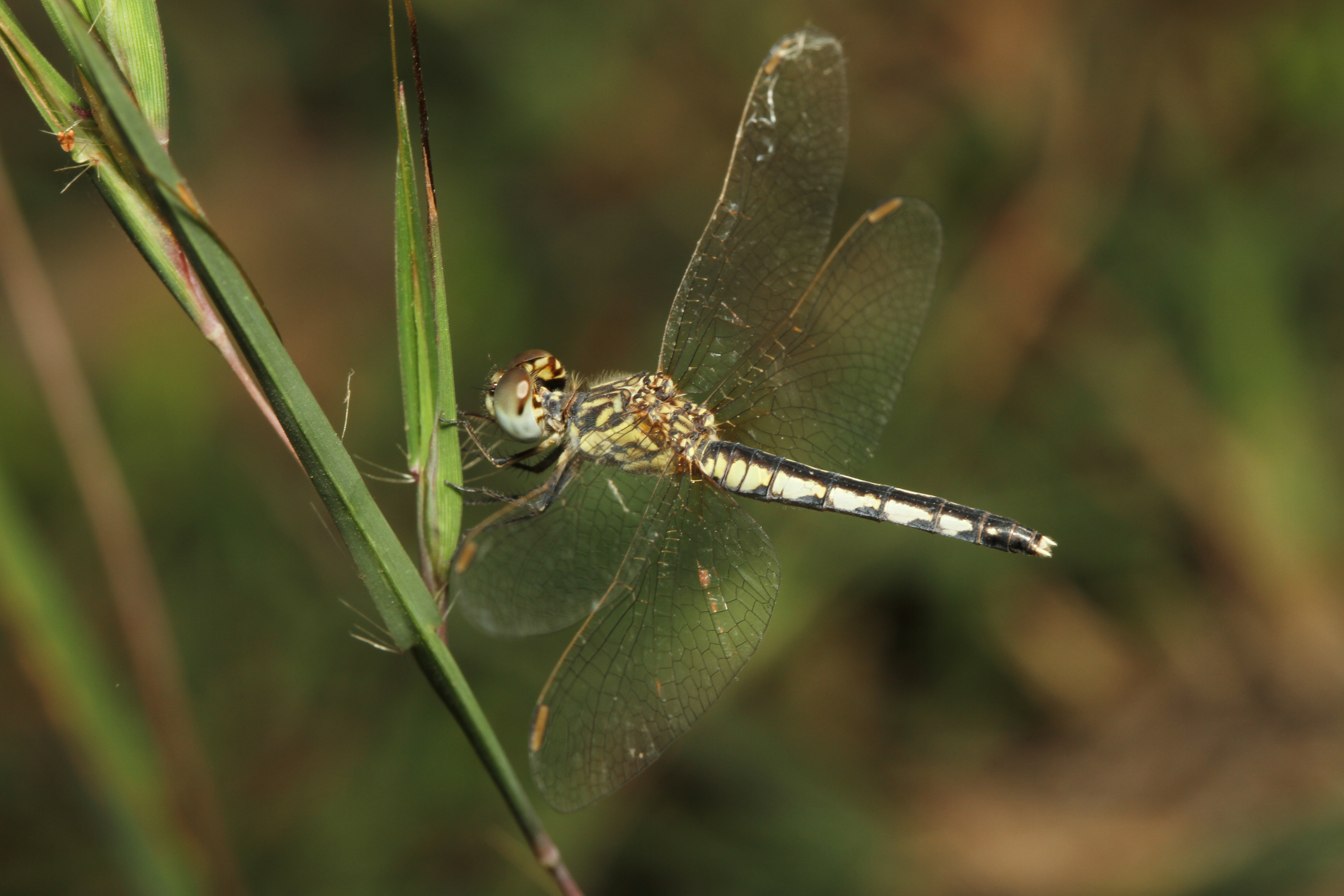
Female

== See also ==
- List of odonates of Sri Lanka
- List of odonates of India
- List of odonata of Kerala
