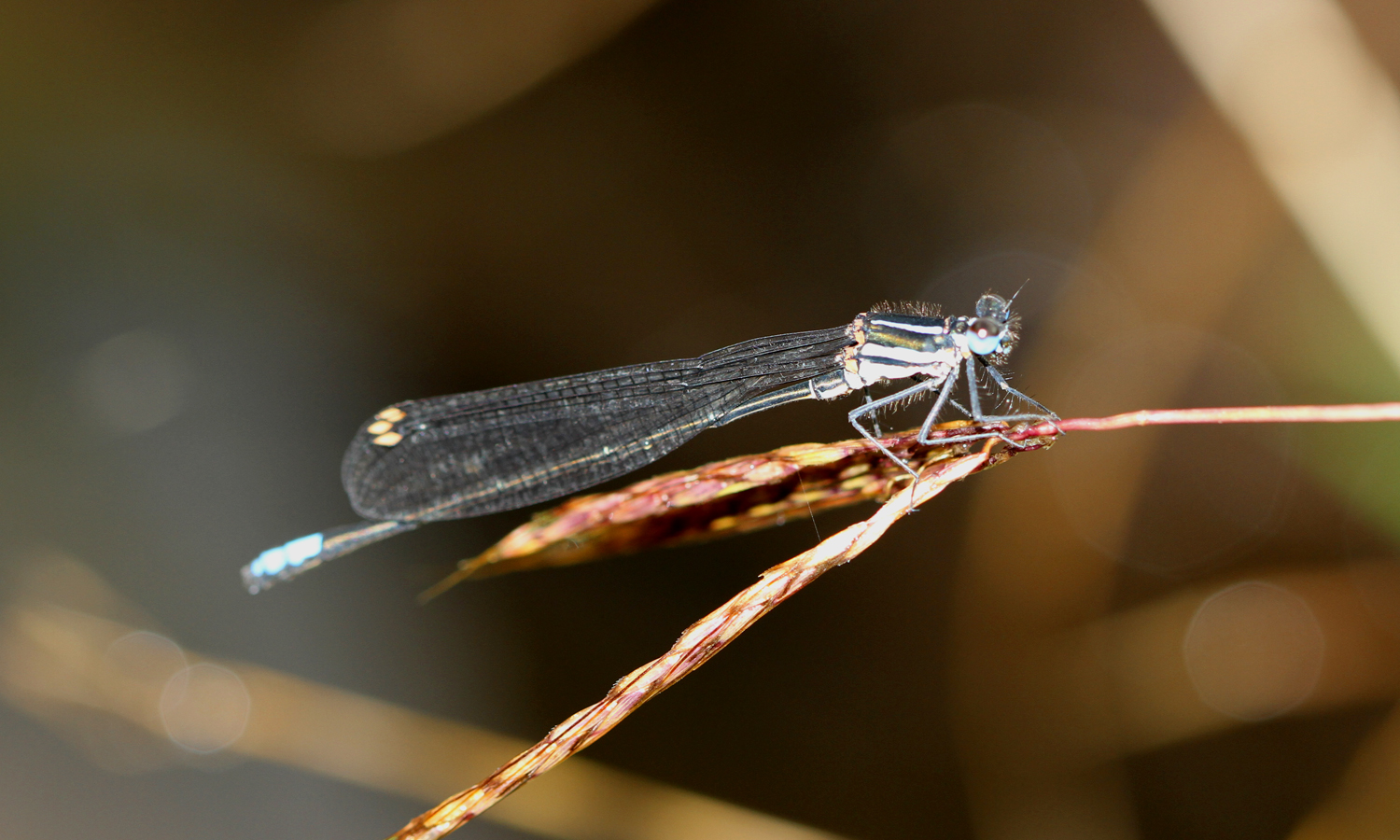

Conservation status
- Data Deficient (IUCN 3.1)

Scientific classification
- Kingdom: Animalia
- Phylum: Arthropoda
- Clade: Pancrustacea
- Class: Insecta
- Order: Odonata
- Suborder: Zygoptera
- Family: Platycnemididae
- Genus: Caconeura
- Species: C. gomphoides

Binomial name
- Caconeura gomphoides (Rambur, 1842)

Synonyms
- Argia gomphoides Rambur, 1842

= Caconeura gomphoides =

Species of damselfly

Caconeura gomphoides is a damselfly species in the family Platycnemididae. It is endemic to high altitude peat bogs and grassy uplands in Nilgiris.

== Description and habitat ==
It is a medium-sized damselfly with black-capped blue eyes. Its thorax is black on dorsum and azure blue on the sides. There is a very narrow azure blue antehumeral stripe and a moderately broad black stripe on the postero-lateral suture on each side. Wings are transparent with reddish-brown pterostigma, framed in thick black nervures. Abdomen is black with azure blue stripes on segment 1 and 2. Segment 3 to 6 have narrow basal rings in azure blue. Segments 8 to 10 are entirely azure blue. Female is similar to the male. It can be distinguished from all other species of this genus by the reddish-brown color of the pterostigma and by the mid-dorsal mark on segment 2. It is also comparatively short and thick than other similar species.

It breeds in small streams in Nilgiris. Commonly found in grassy upland, clinging to ferns on the banks of small streams covered with grass.

== See also ==
- List of odonates of India
- List of odonata of Kerala
