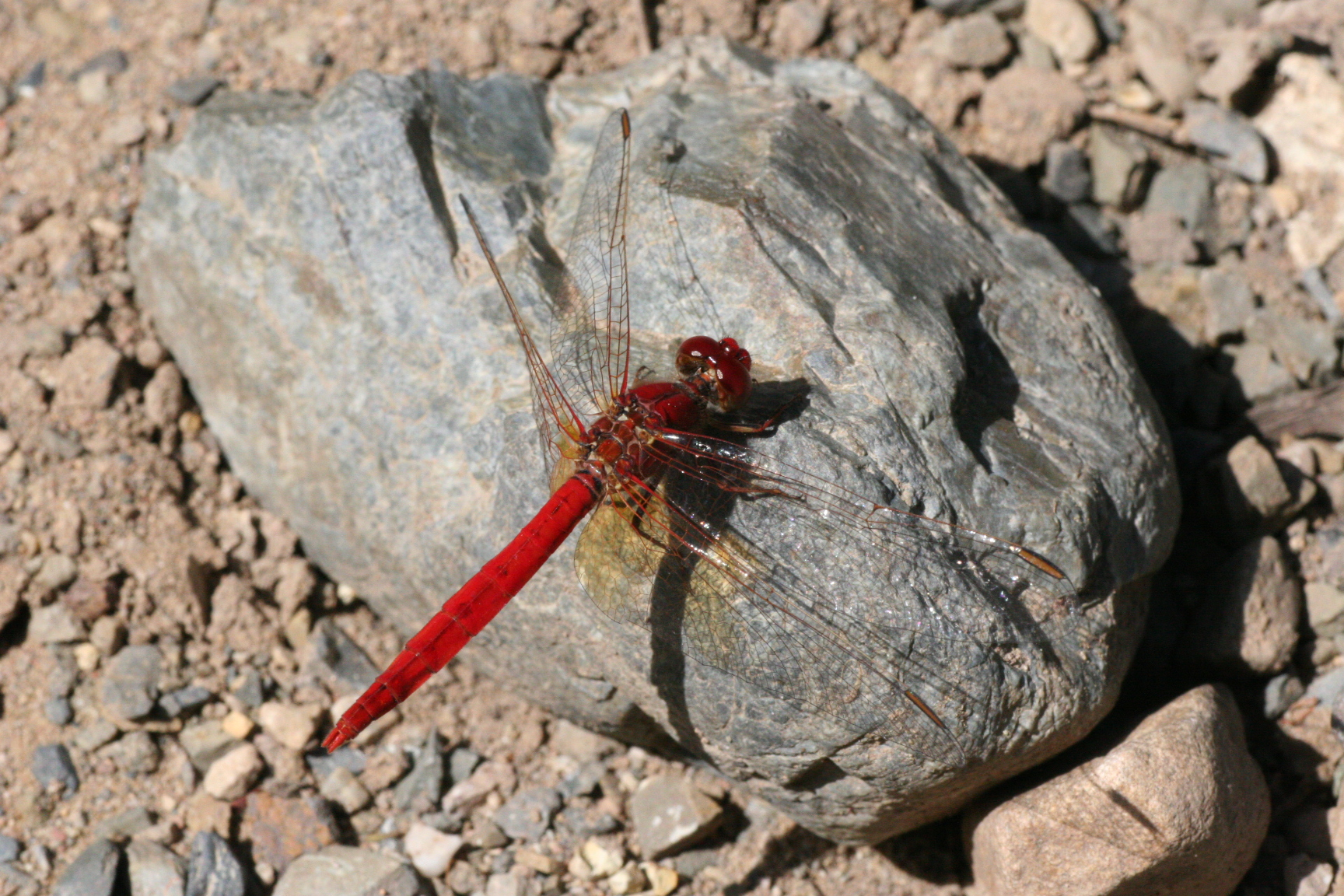
- Male scarlet percher

Scientific classification
- Kingdom: Animalia
- Phylum: Arthropoda
- Clade: Pancrustacea
- Class: Insecta
- Order: Odonata
- Infraorder: Anisoptera
- Superfamily: Libelluloidea
- Family: Libellulidae
- Subfamily: Sympetrinae
- Genus: Diplacodes; Kirby, 1889

= Diplacodes =

Perchers

Genus of dragonflies

Diplacodes is a genus of dragonflies in the Libellulidae family. They are commonly known as perchers. Their colours range from the totally black body of the African Diplacodes lefebvrii, the lovely pale blue of India's Diplacodes trivialis, to the intense red of the Asian–Australian Diplacodes haematodes.

Various species of this genus occur in Africa, Asia, Australia and the South West Pacific. They are generally small in size.

== Etymology ==
The genus name Diplacodes combines Diplax, a genus name derived from the Greek δίς (dis, "twice") and πλάξ (plax, "flat and broad"), with the Greek suffix –ώδης (-ōdēs, "resembling" or "having the nature of"). The name refers to the similarity of the genus to Diplax and Diplacina.

== Species ==
The genus Diplacodes includes the following species:

Male	Female	Scientific name	Common name	Distribution
		Diplacodes bipunctata (Brauer, 1865)	wandering percher	Australia
		Diplacodes deminuta Lieftinck, 1969	little percher	Central Africa
		Diplacodes exilis Ris, 1911		Madagascar
		Diplacodes haematodes (Burmeister, 1839)	scarlet percher	Australia (except Tasmania), Timor, New Guinea, Vanuatu, and New Caledonia.
		Diplacodes lefebvrii (Rambur, 1842)	black percher	Africa and southern Eurasia.
		Diplacodes luminans (Karsch, 1893)	luminous percher, barbet, barbet percher	Central Africa
		Diplacodes melanopsis (Martin, 1901)	black-faced percher	Eastern Australia
		Diplacodes nebulosa (Fabricius, 1793)	charcoal-winged percher	Asia and northern Australia
		Diplacodes pumila Dijkstra, 2006	dwarf percher	Democratic Republic of the Congo, Mozambique, South Africa, Tanzania, Zambia, and Zimbabwe
		Diplacodes trivialis (Rambur, 1842)	chalky percher, ground skimmer	India
