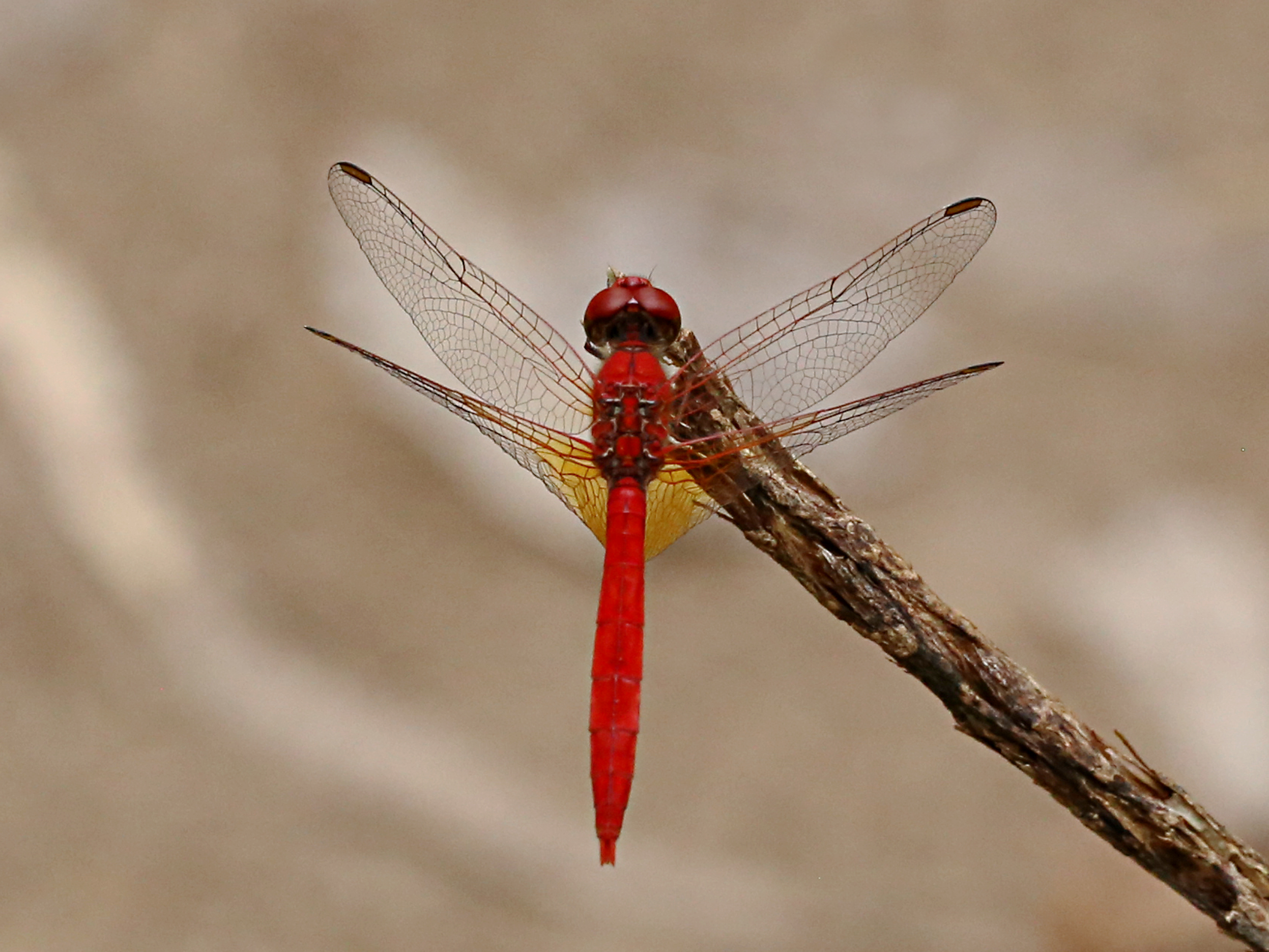
- Male
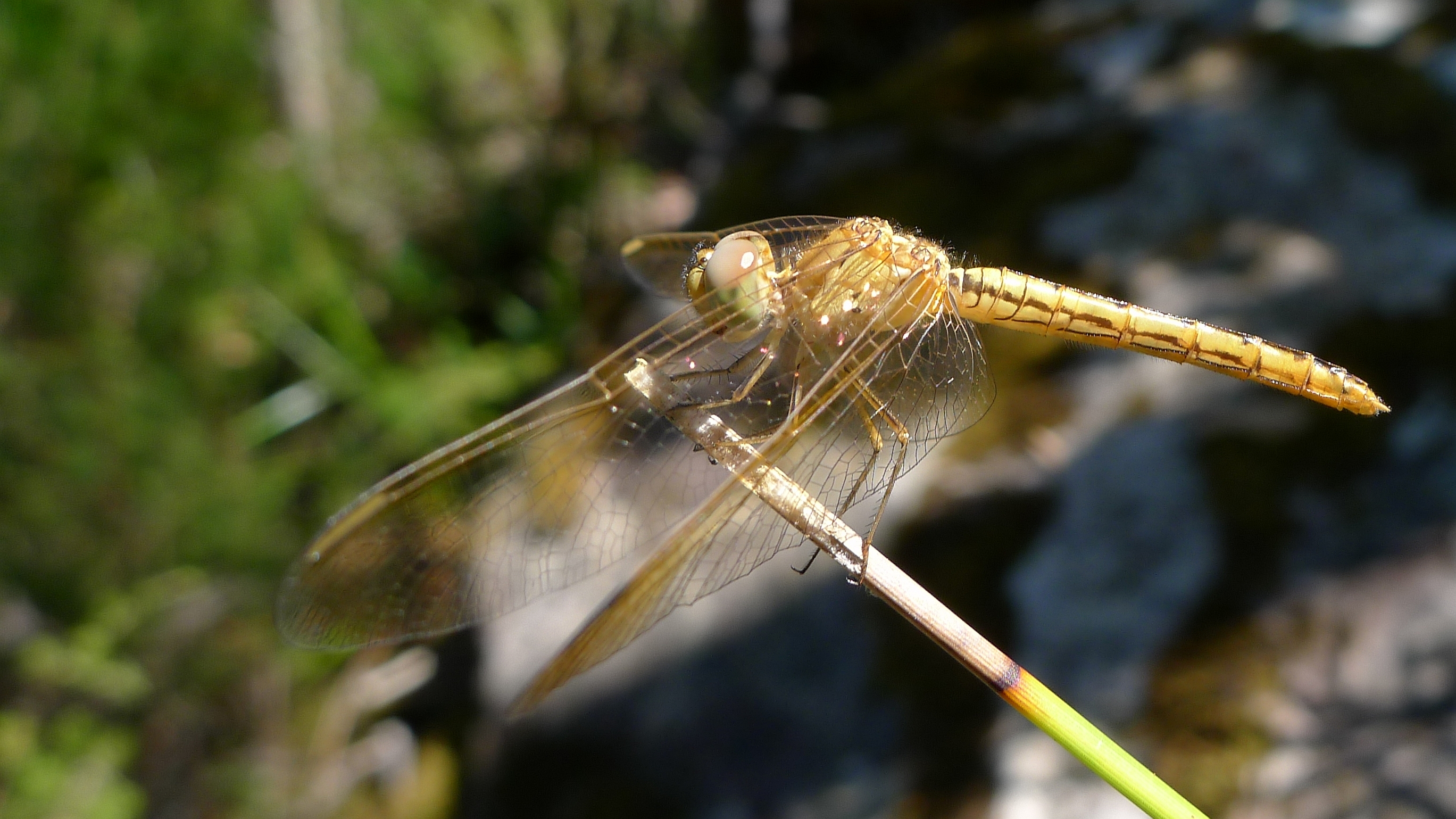
- Female

Conservation status
- Least Concern (IUCN 3.1)

Scientific classification
- Kingdom: Animalia
- Phylum: Arthropoda
- Clade: Pancrustacea
- Class: Insecta
- Order: Odonata
- Infraorder: Anisoptera
- Family: Libellulidae
- Genus: Diplacodes
- Species: D. haematodes

Binomial name
- Diplacodes haematodes (Burmeister, 1839)

Synonyms
- Libellula haematodes Burmeister, 1839; Libellula sanguinea MacLeay in King, 1827; Trithemis rubra Kirby, 1889; Trithemis subhyalina Förster, 1898

= Diplacodes haematodes =

Scarlet percher

Species of dragonfly

Diplacodes haematodes, the scarlet percher, is a species of dragonfly in the family Libellulidae. It occurs throughout Australia (except Tasmania), Timor, New Guinea, Vanuatu, and New Caledonia. It is locally common in habitats with hot sunny exposed sites at or near rivers, streams, ponds, and lakes. It often prefers to settle on hot rocks rather than twigs or leaves, and is quite wary. This is a spectacular species of dragonfly, although small in size (wingspan 60mm, length 35mm). The male is brilliant red, the female yellow-ochre. Females have yellow infuscation suffusing the outer wings, while the males have similar colour at the bases of the wings.

== Etymology ==
The genus name Diplacodes combines Diplax, a genus name derived from the Greek δίς (dis, "twice") and πλάξ (plax, "flat and broad"), with the Greek suffix –ώδης (-ōdēs, "resembling" or "having the nature of"). The name refers to the similarity of the genus to Diplax and Diplacina.

The species name haematodes is derived from the Greek αἱματώδης (haimatōdēs, "blood-like" or "looking like blood"), referring to the blood-red colour of the body and wing veins.

== Gallery ==
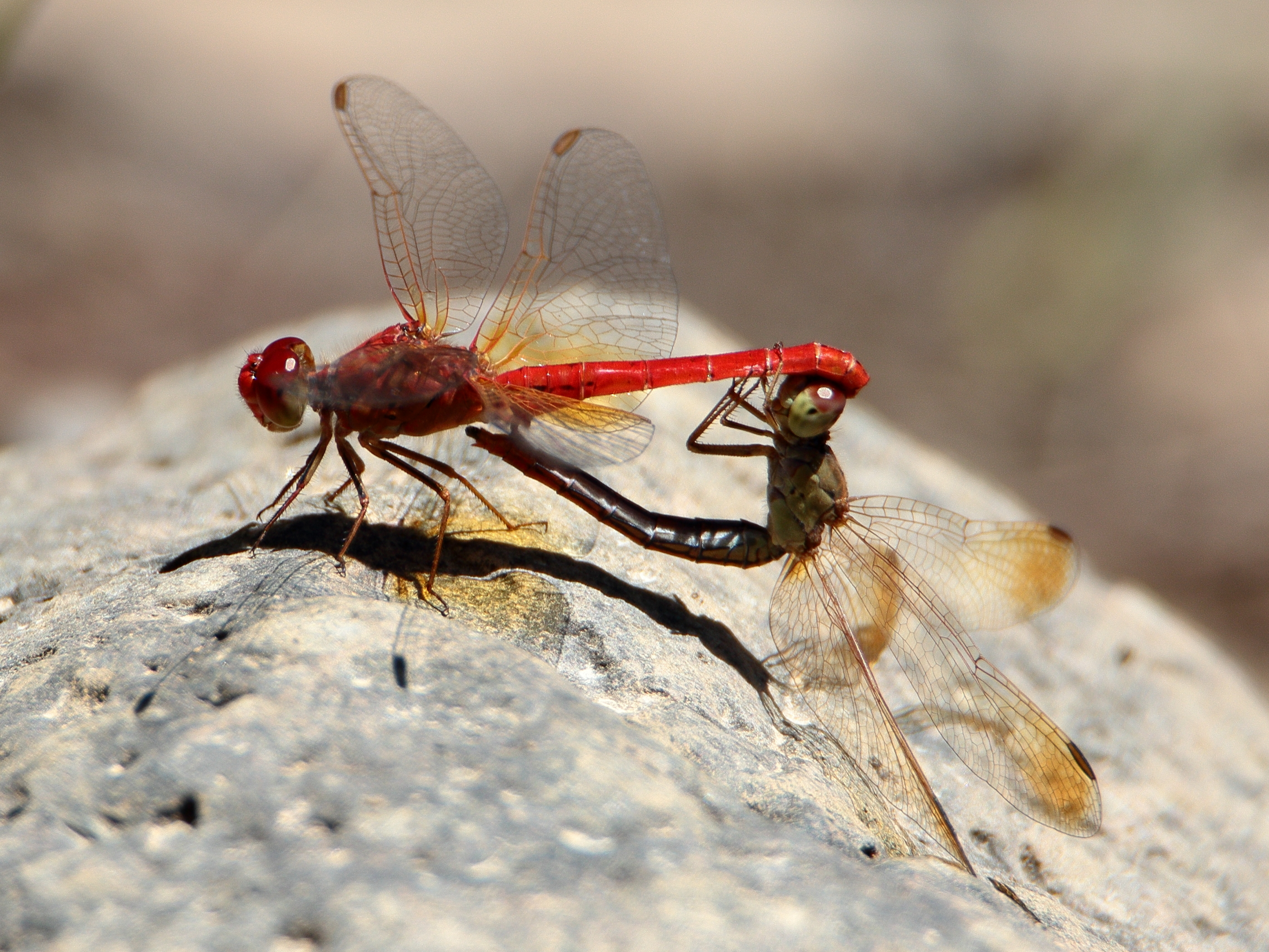
Male and female mating

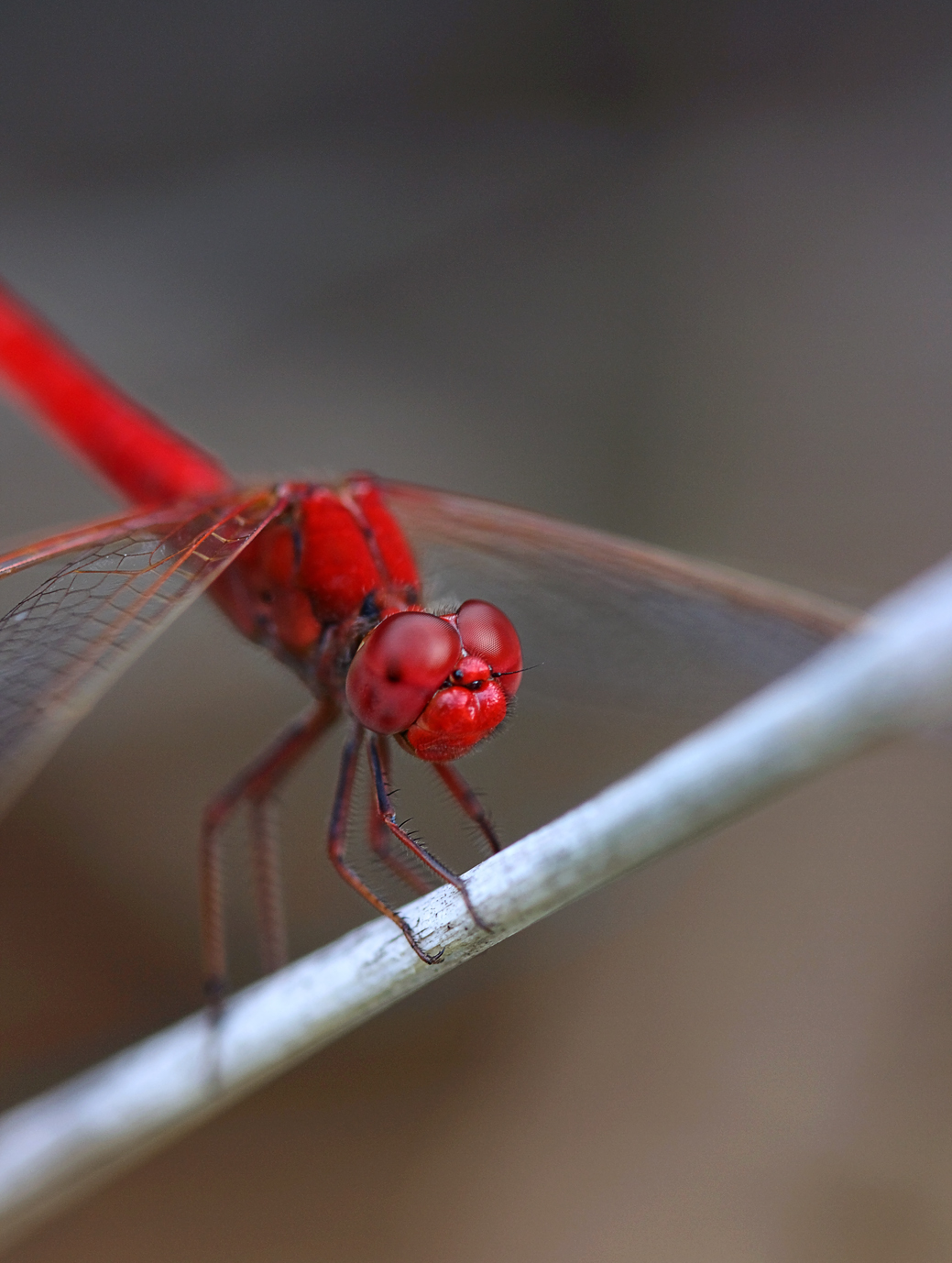
Red

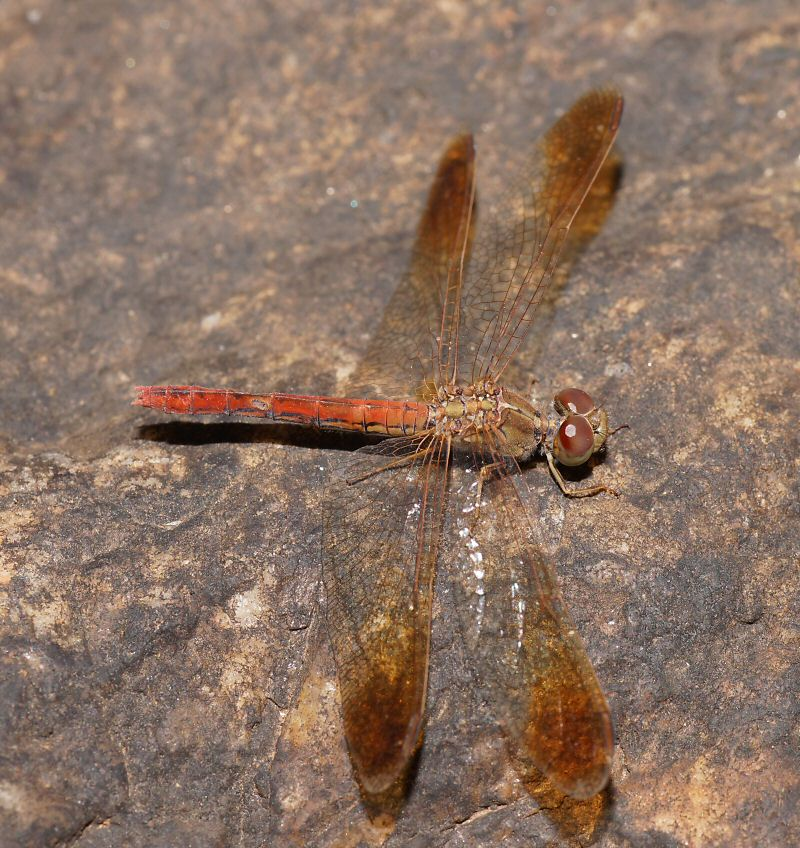
Mature female

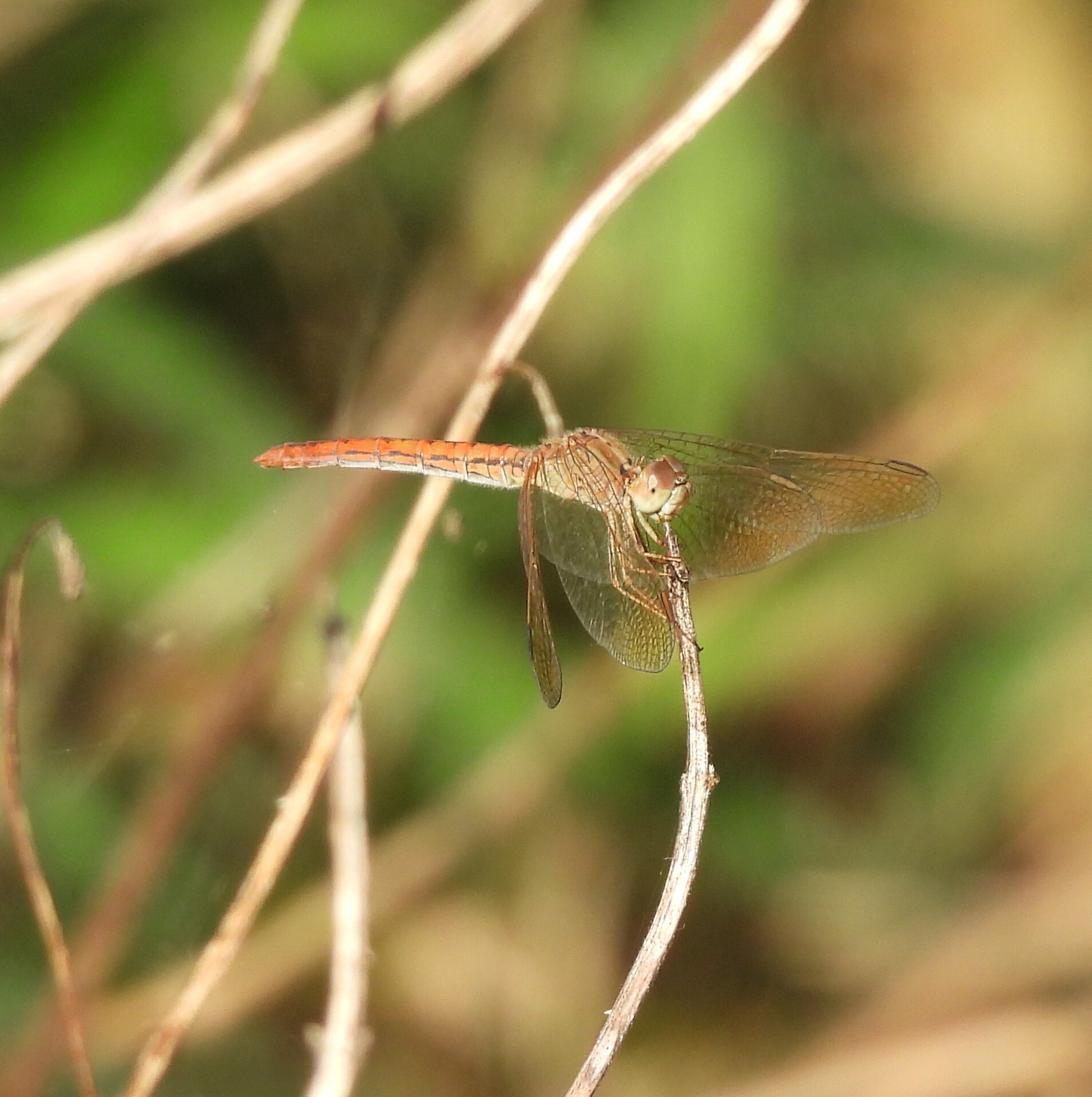
Female

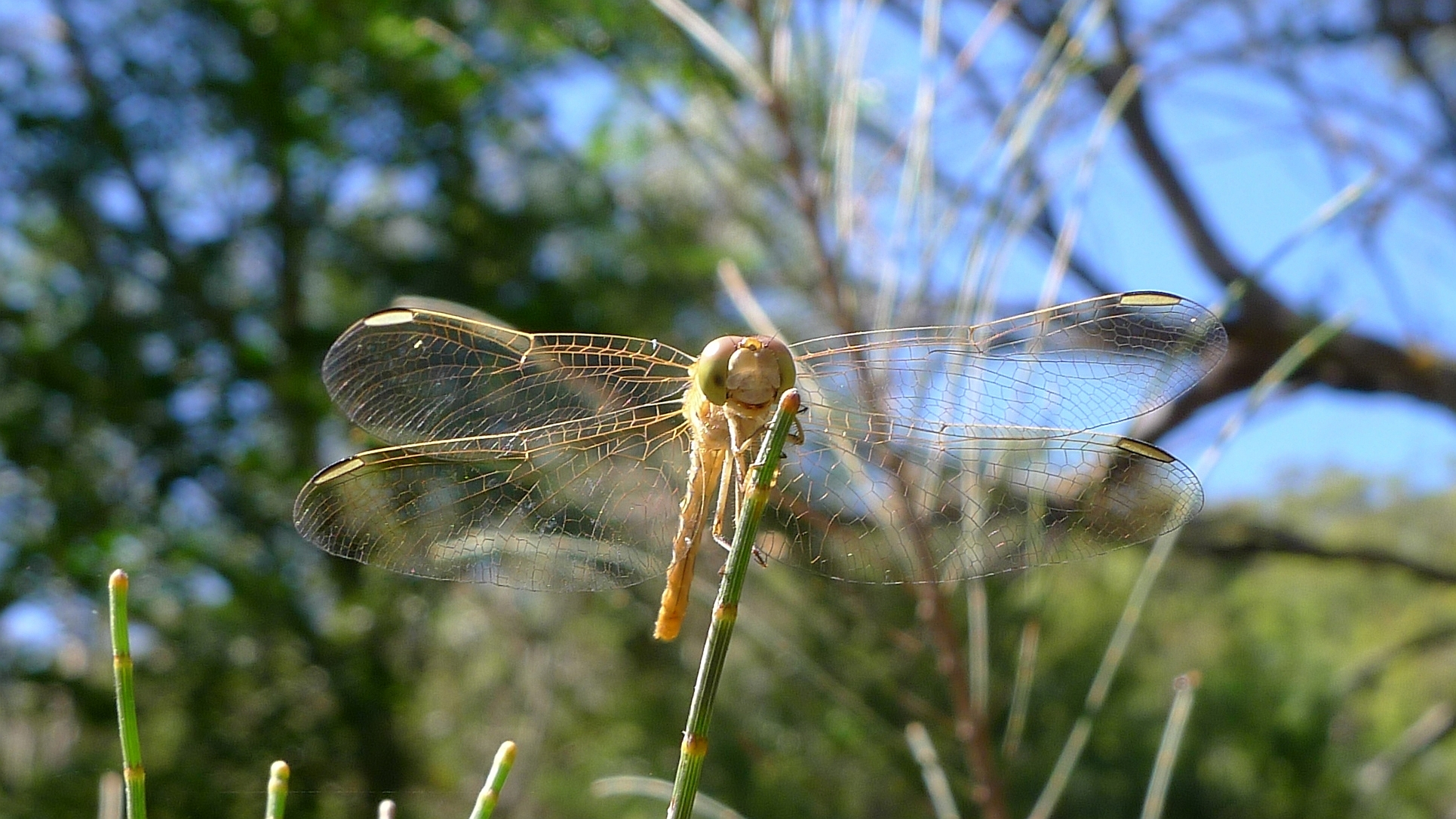
Female, face-on

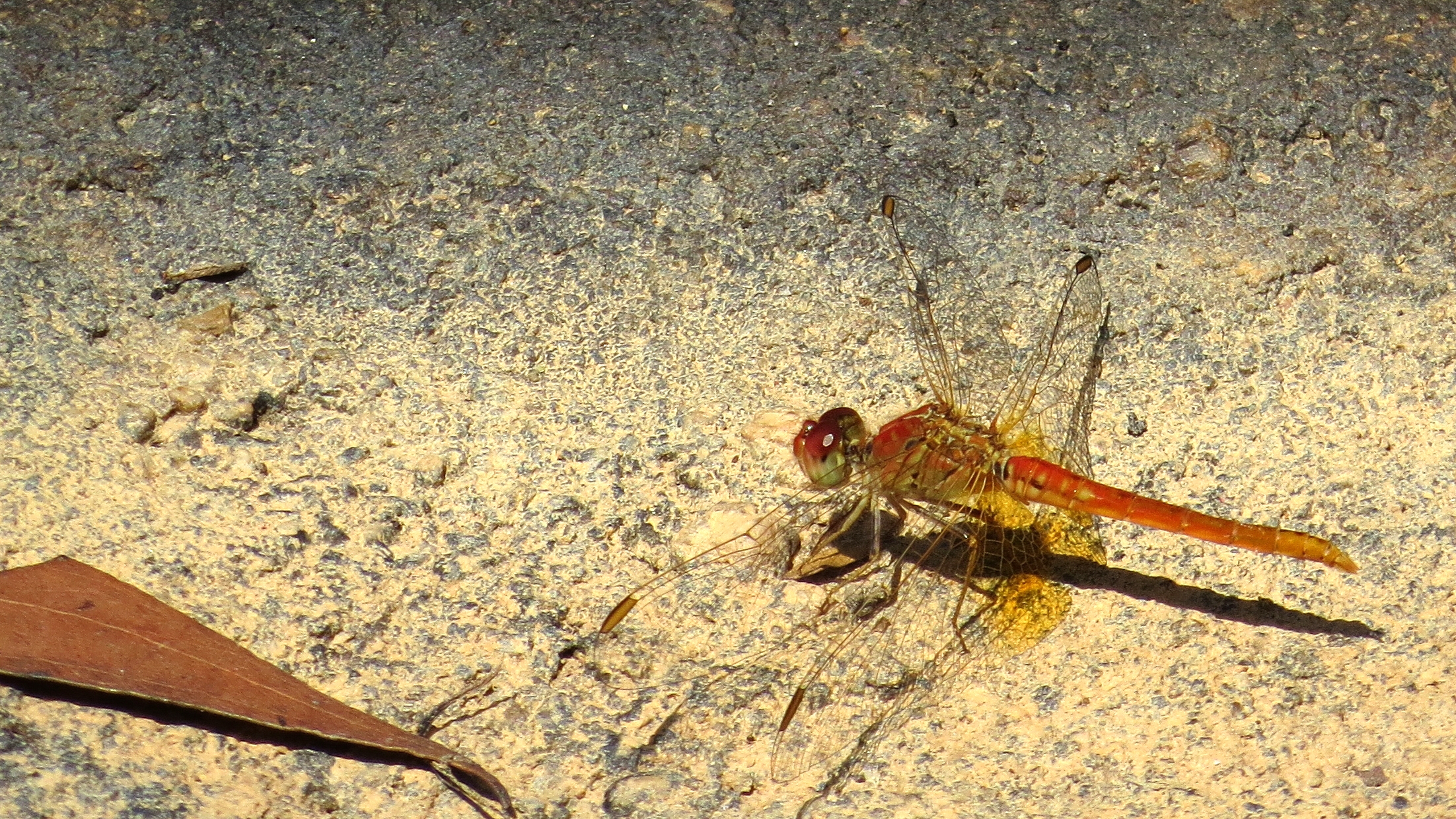
Male wings have colour near their base

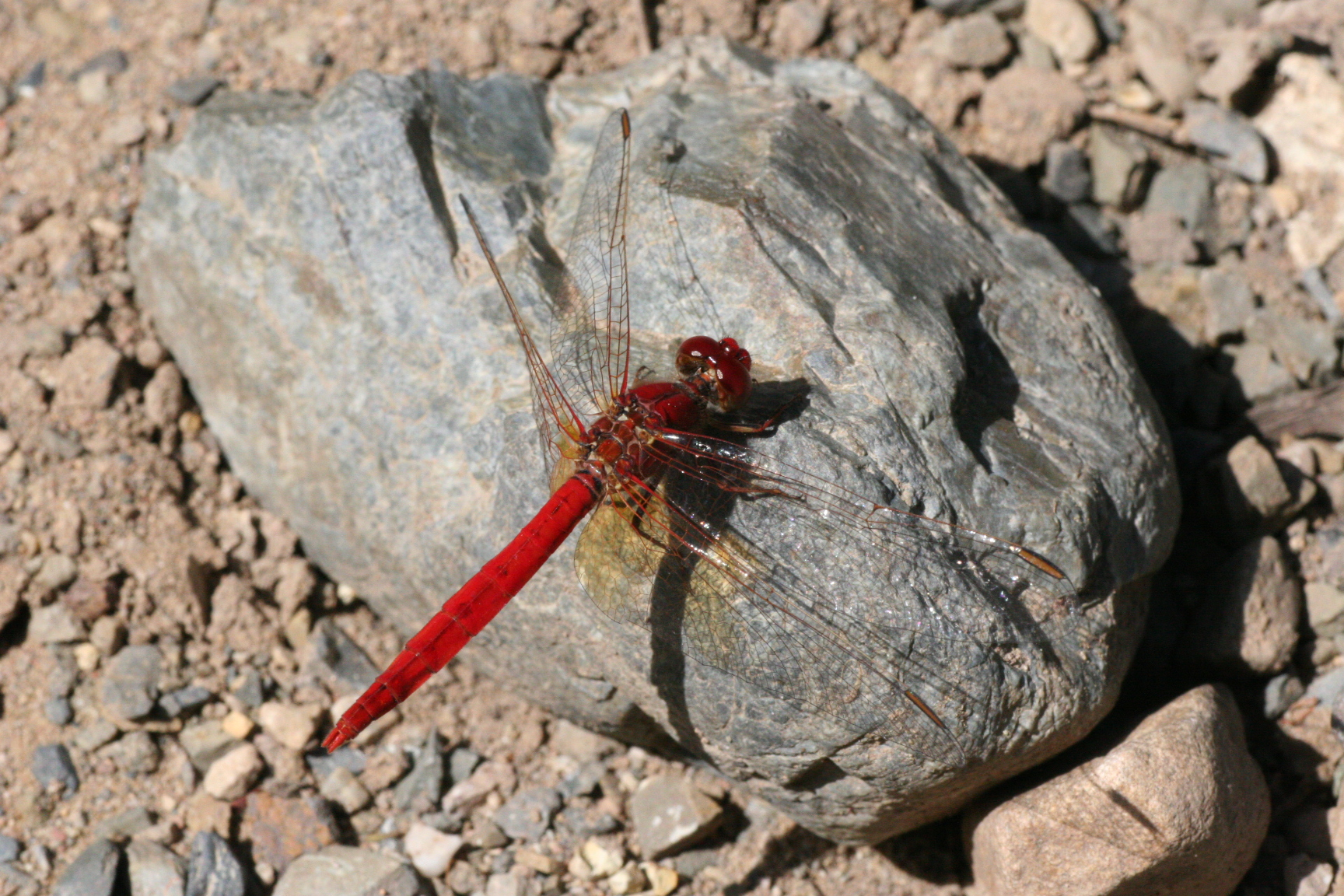
Male

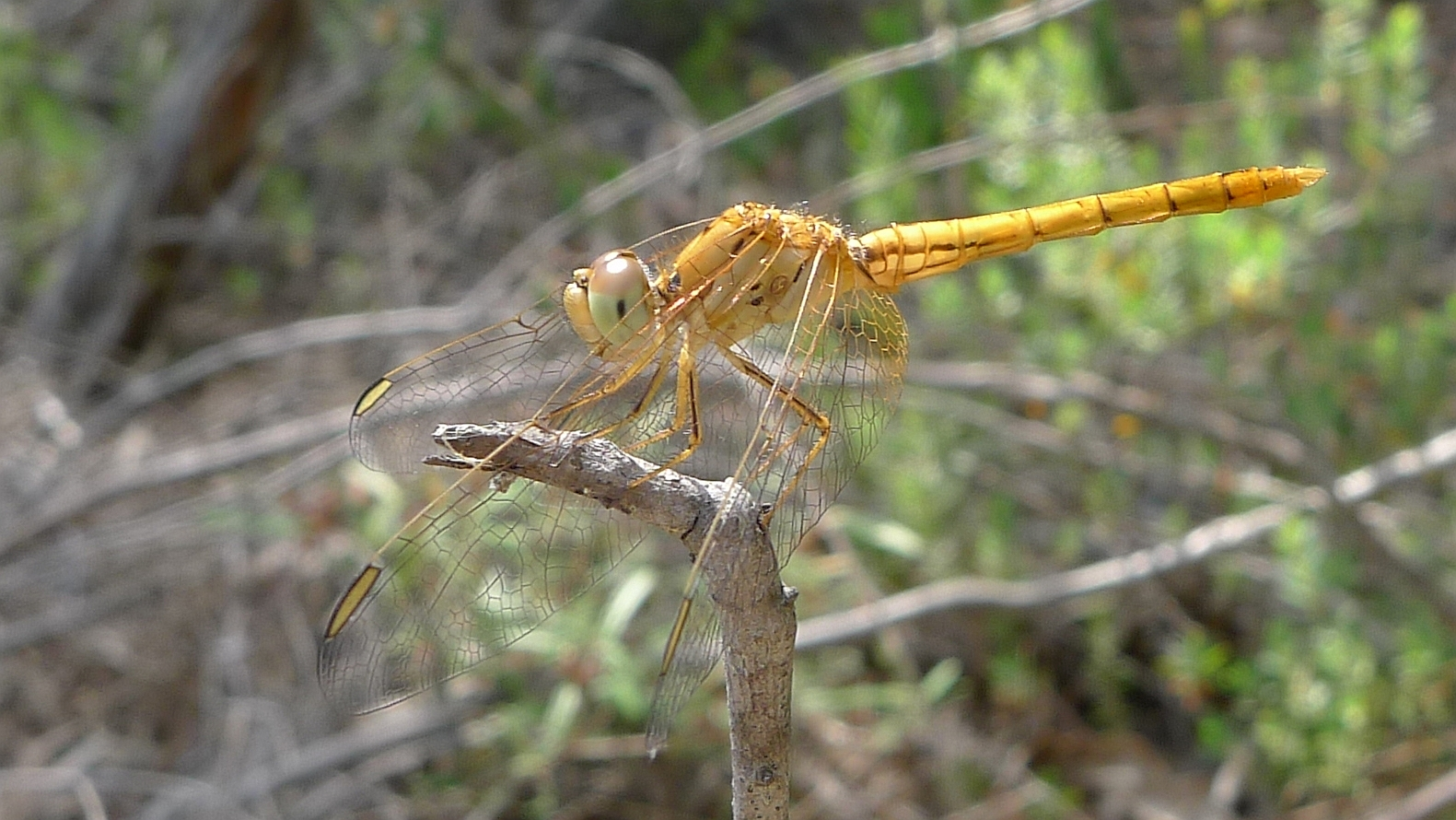
Immature male before turning red

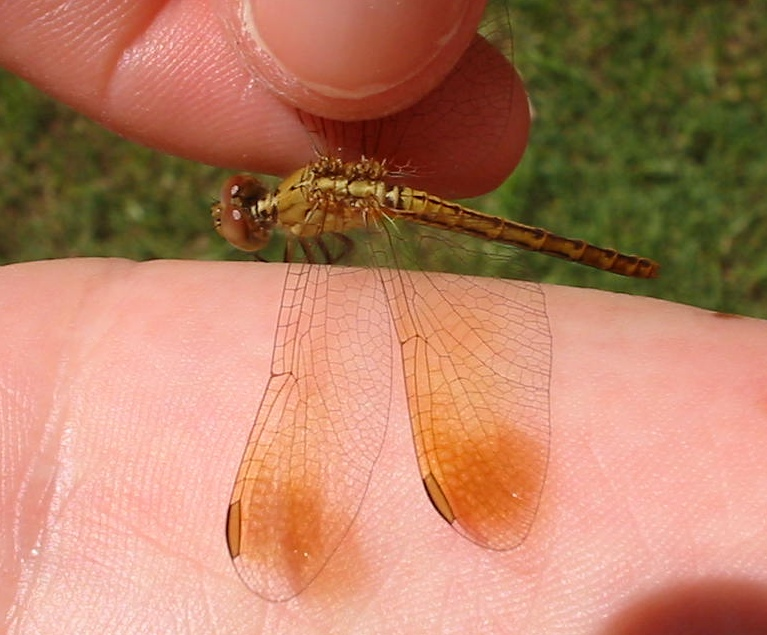
Female, highlighting brownish wingtips

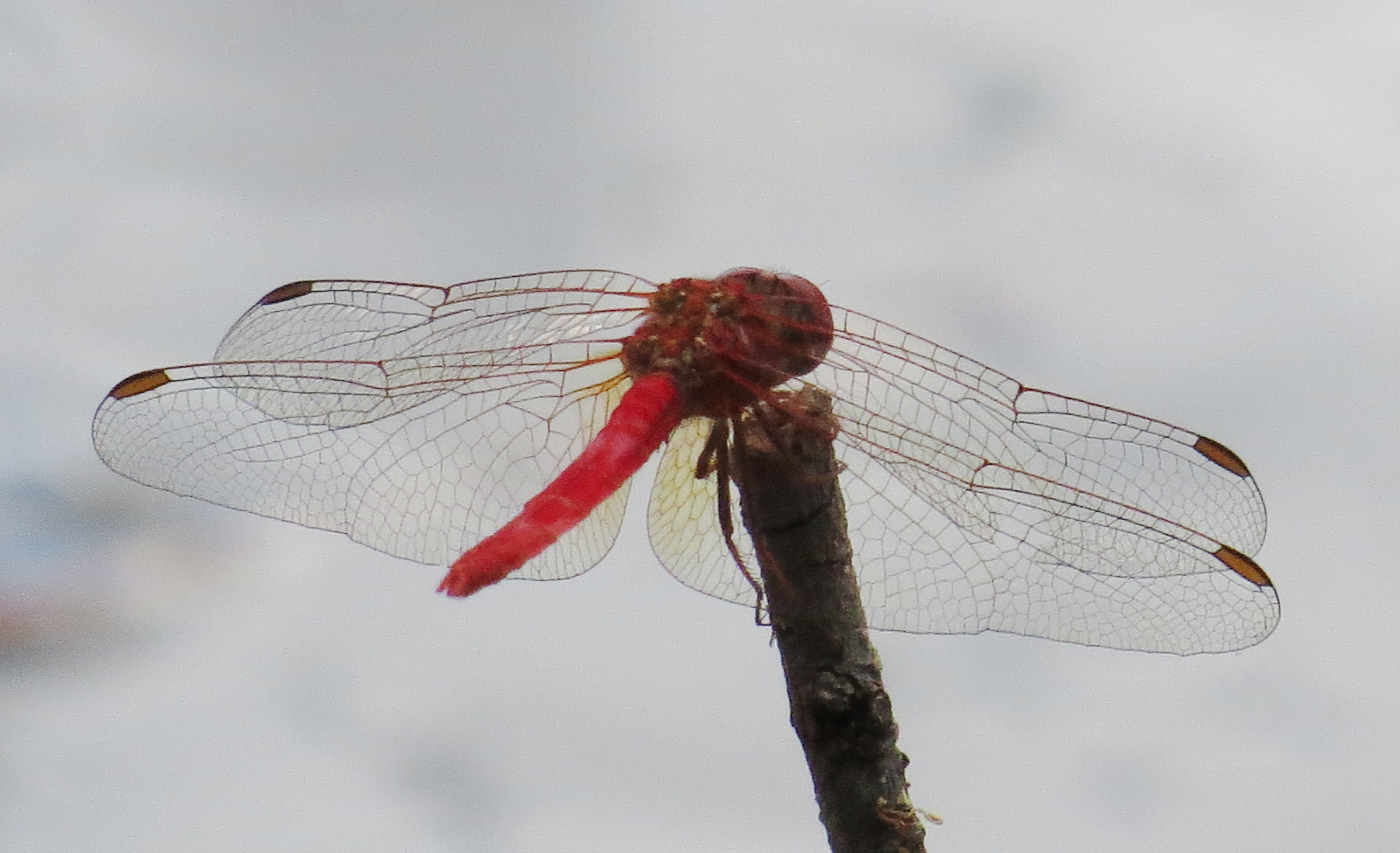
Male, highlighting wing venation

Diagram of male wings

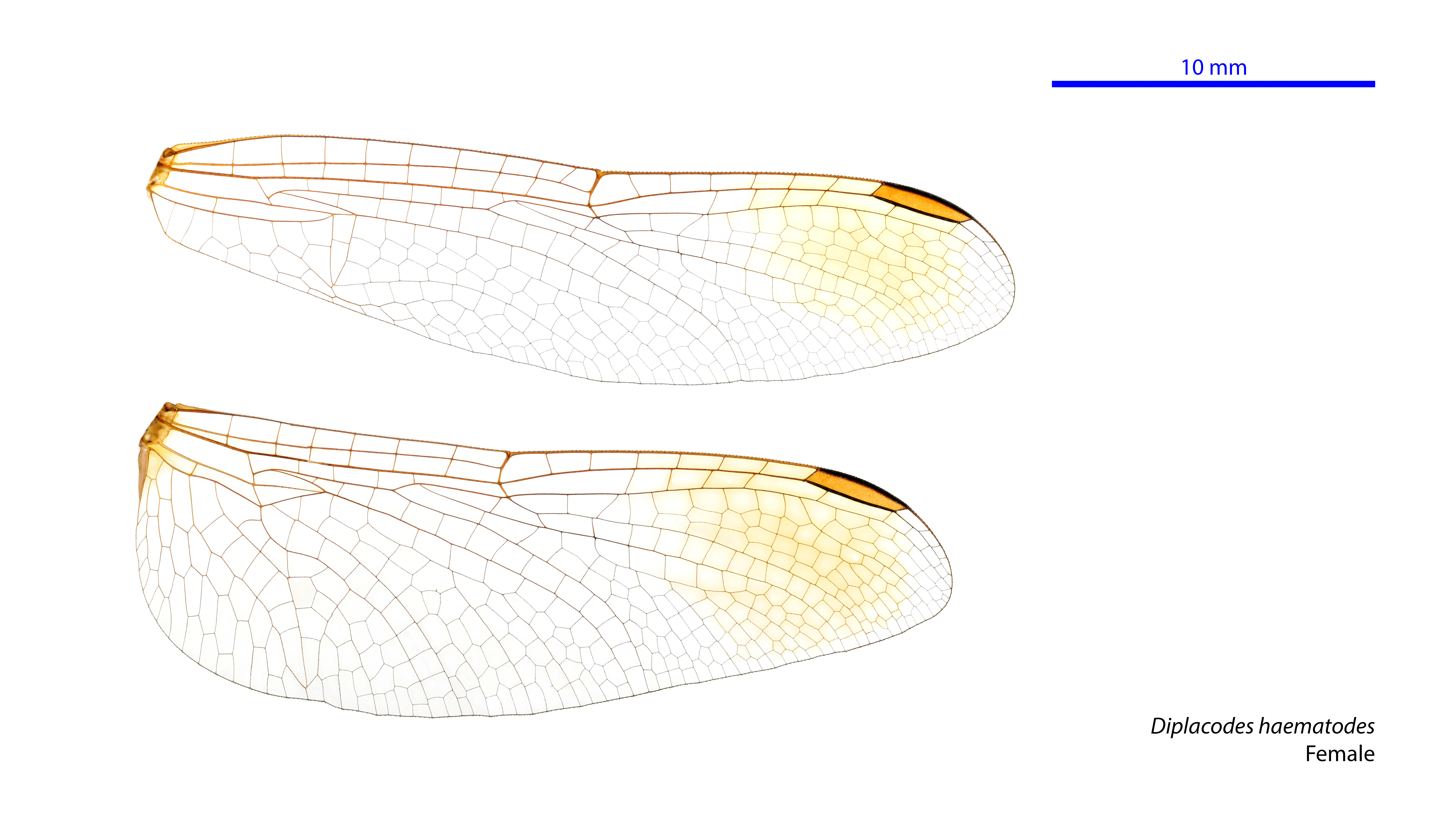
Photo of female wings
