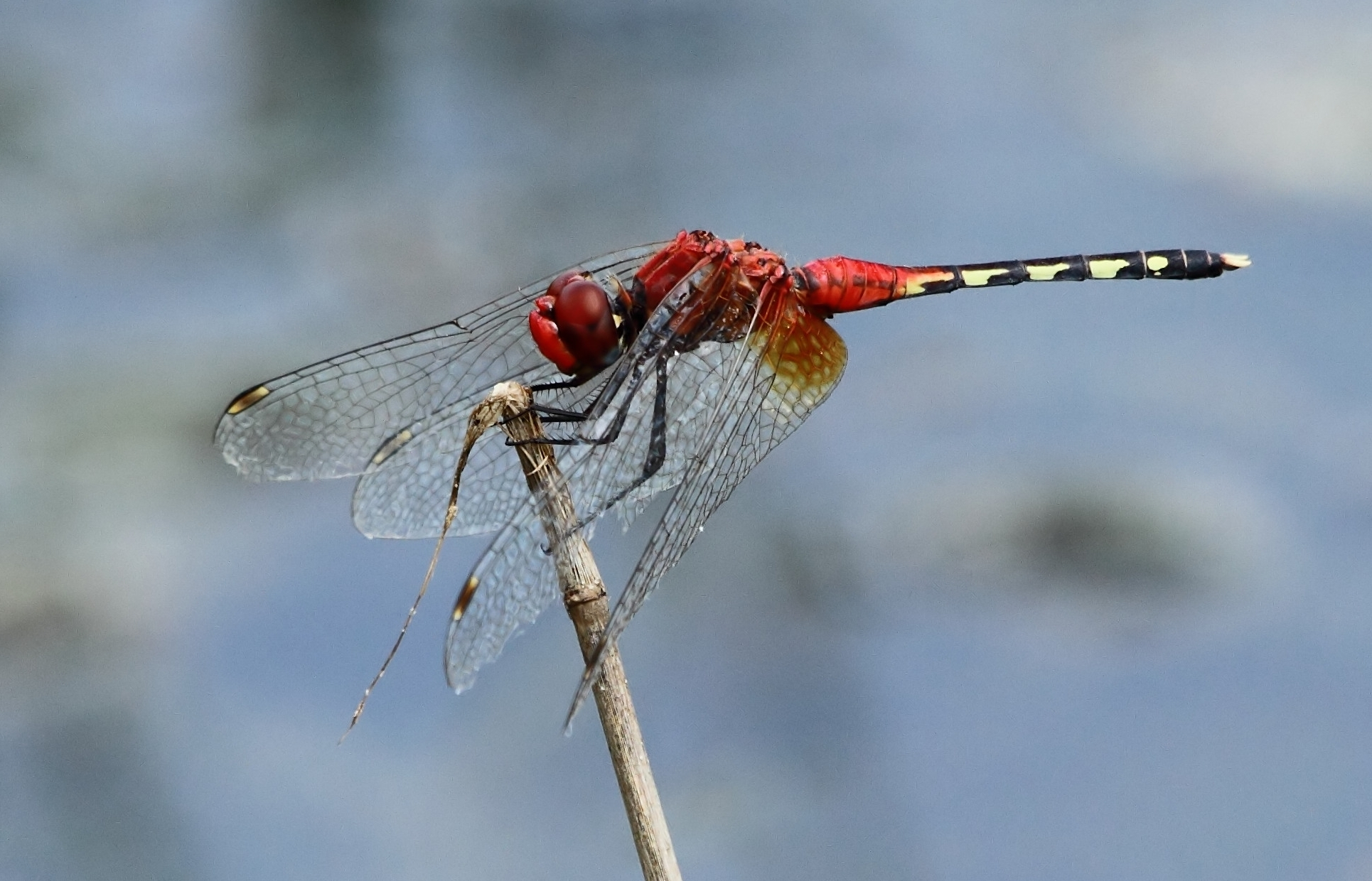
- Male

Conservation status
- Least Concern (IUCN 3.1)

Scientific classification
- Kingdom: Animalia
- Phylum: Arthropoda
- Class: Insecta
- Order: Odonata
- Infraorder: Anisoptera
- Family: Libellulidae
- Genus: Diplacodes
- Species: D. luminans

Binomial name
- Diplacodes luminans (Karsch, 1893)

Synonyms
- Philonomon luminans (Karsch, 1893)

= Diplacodes luminans =

Species of dragonfly

Diplacodes luminans is a species of dragonfly in the family Libellulidae known commonly as the barbet percher. It is native to Central Africa, where it is widespread and common.

This species is 34–40 mm long with a wingspan of 59–66 mm. The males have a black and yellow abdomen with a distinctive red base; both males and females have broad amber patches at the bases of the hindwings and six to seven antenodal crossveins.

It lives in many types of swampy habitat.
