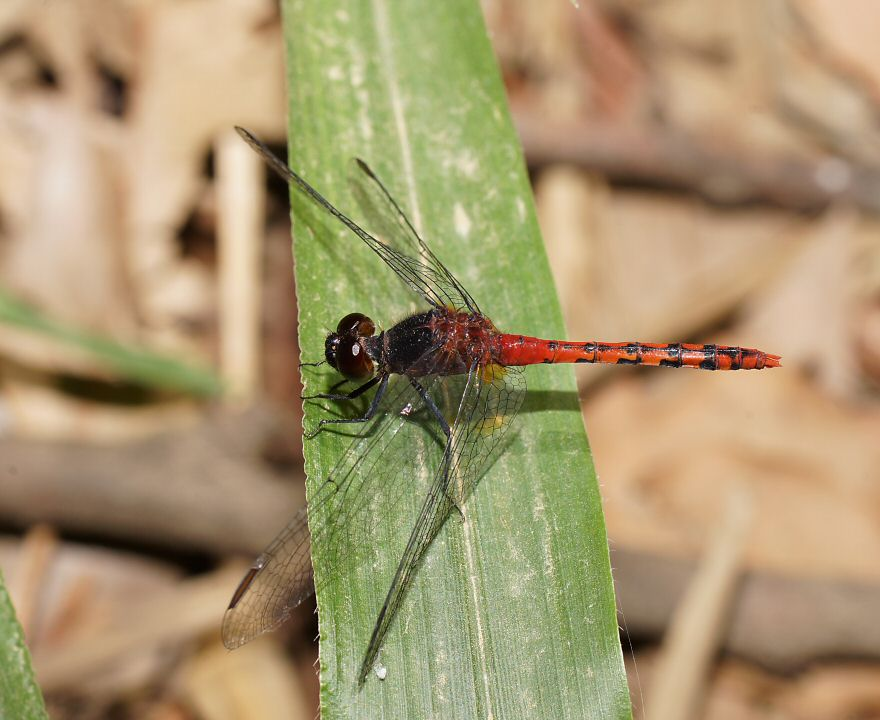
- Male
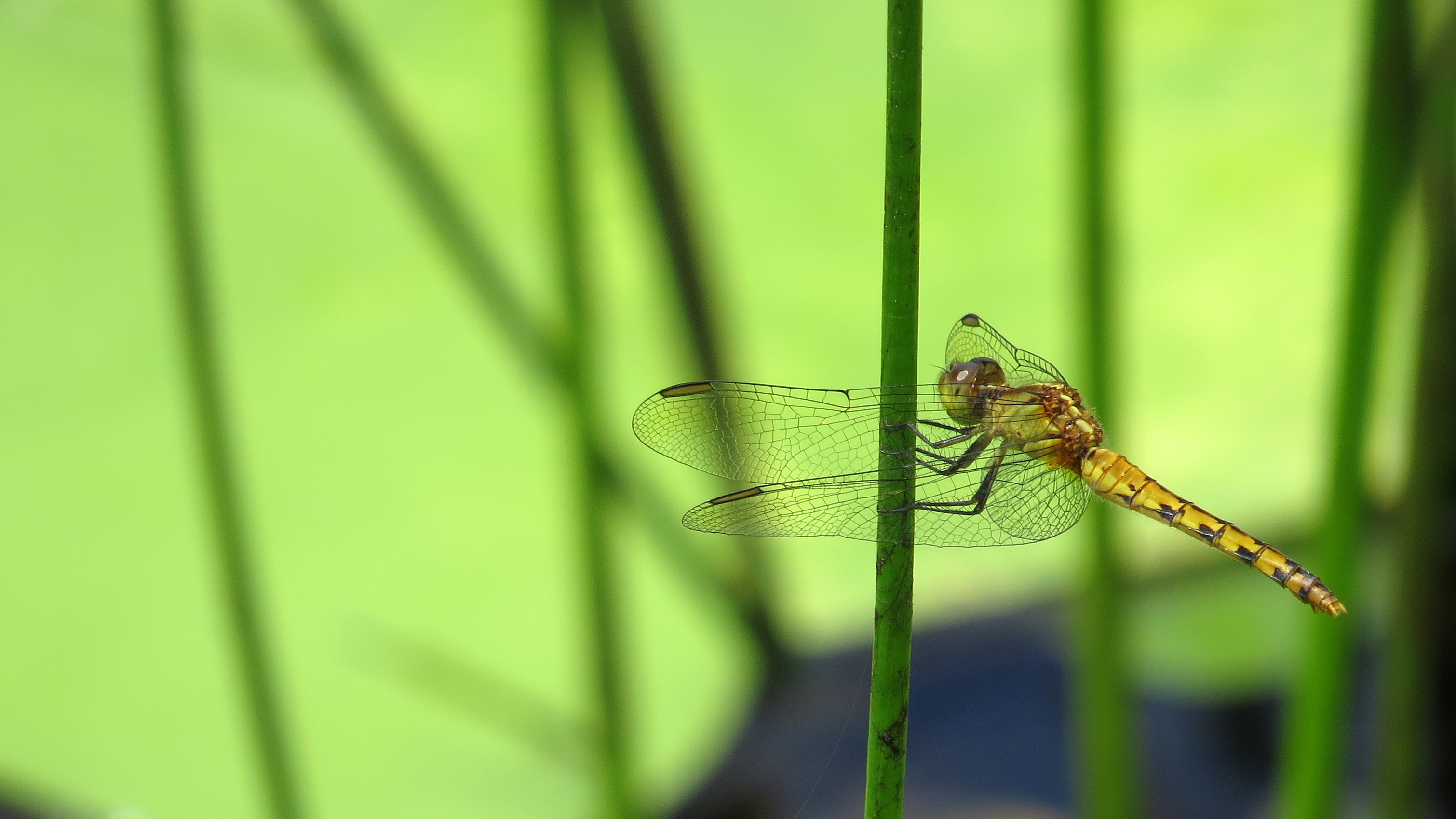
- Female

Conservation status
- Least Concern (IUCN 3.1)

Scientific classification
- Kingdom: Animalia
- Phylum: Arthropoda
- Clade: Pancrustacea
- Class: Insecta
- Order: Odonata
- Suborder: Anisoptera
- Superfamily: Libelluloidea
- Family: Libellulidae
- Genus: Diplacodes
- Species: D. melanopsis

Binomial name
- Diplacodes melanopsis (Martin, 1901)

Synonyms
- Diplax melanopsis Martin, 1901

= Diplacodes melanopsis =

Black-faced percher

Species of dragonfly

Diplacodes melanopsis is a species of dragonfly in the family Libellulidae known commonly as the blackfaced percher or black-faced percher. It occurs on the Australian mainland from around Brisbane to the South Australian-Victorian border.

Diplacodes melanopsis is a small dragonfly. Mature males have a black face and front of its body, and a red abdomen with black markings; females are amber and yellow with black markings.

== Etymology ==
The genus name Diplacodes combines Diplax, a genus name derived from the Greek δίς (dis, "twice") and πλάξ (plax, "flat and broad"), with the Greek suffix –ώδης (-ōdēs, "resembling" or "having the nature of"). The name refers to the similarity of the genus to Diplax and Diplacina.

The species name melanopsis is derived from the Greek μελαν- (melan, "black") and ὄψις (opsis, "face" or "appearance"), referring to its brilliant black face.

== Gallery ==
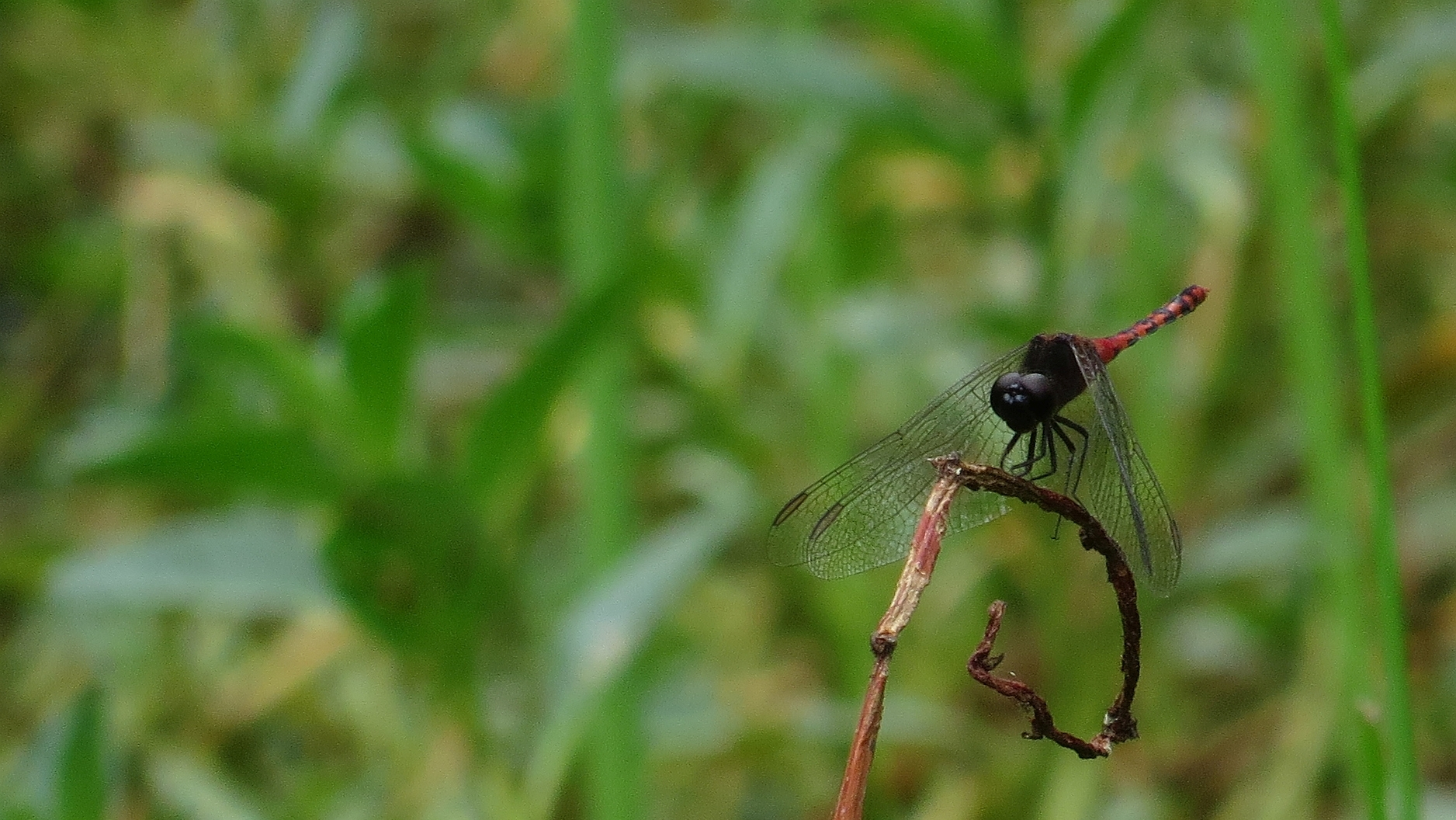
Black face

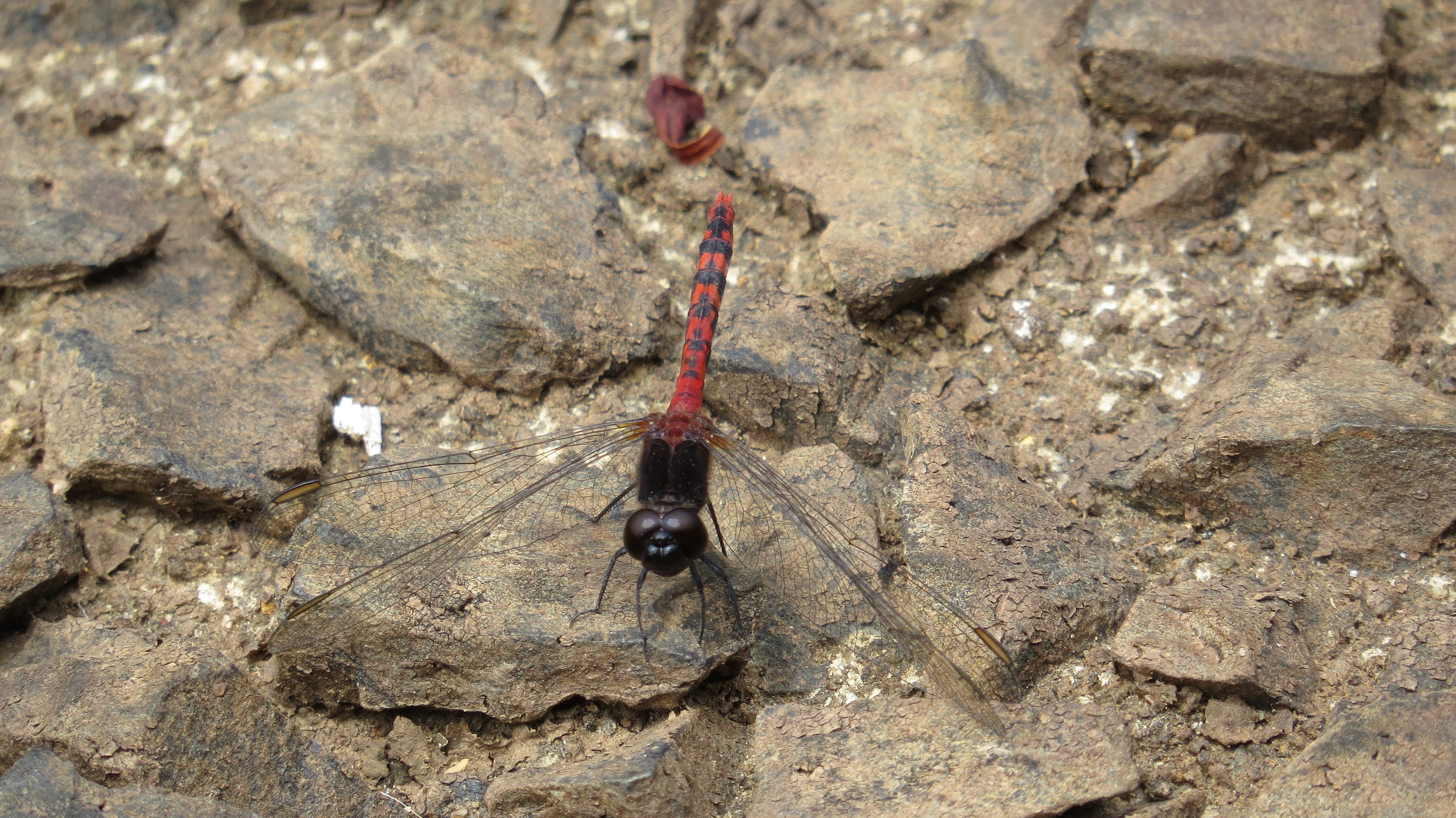
Male face on

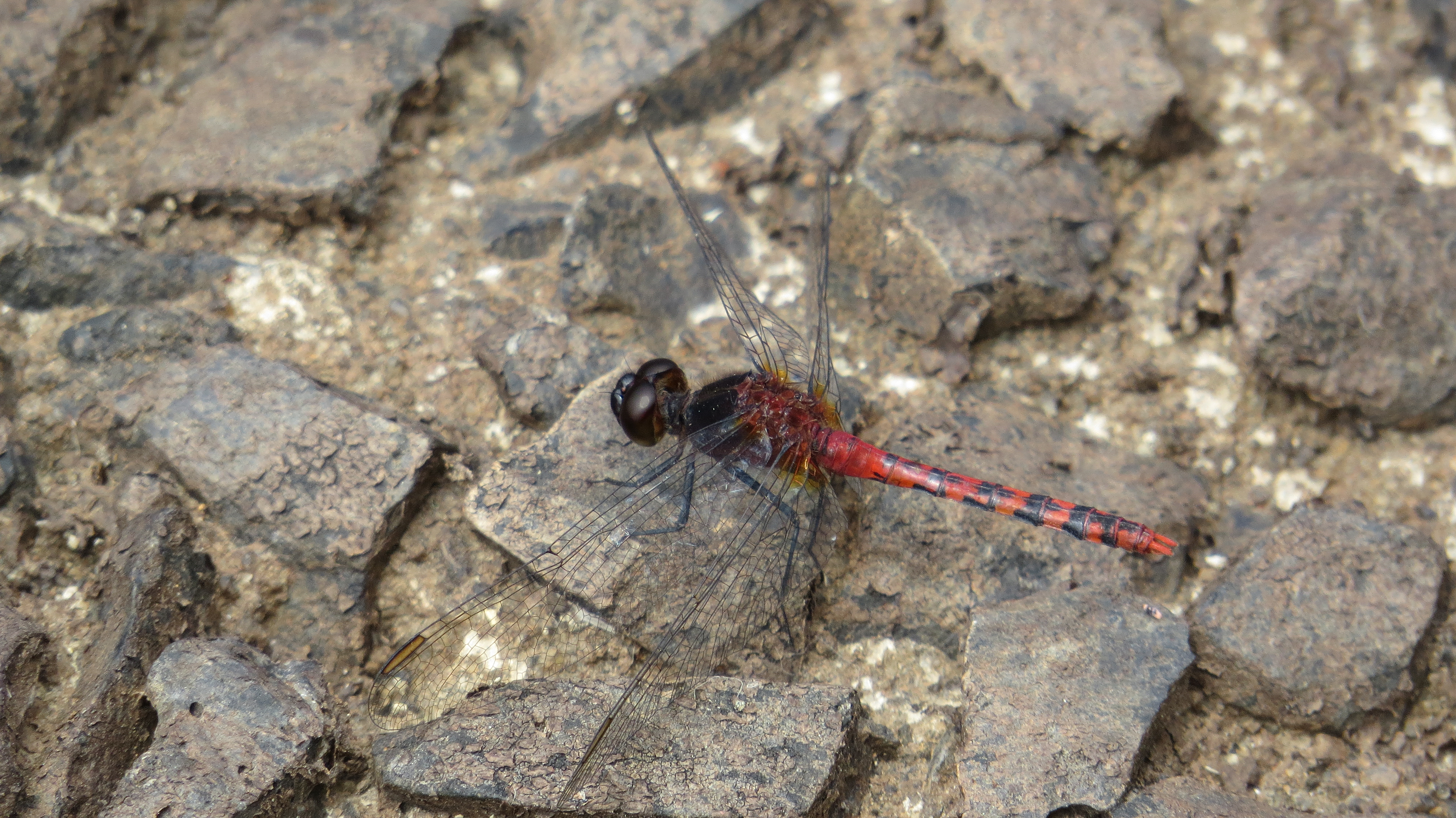
Male

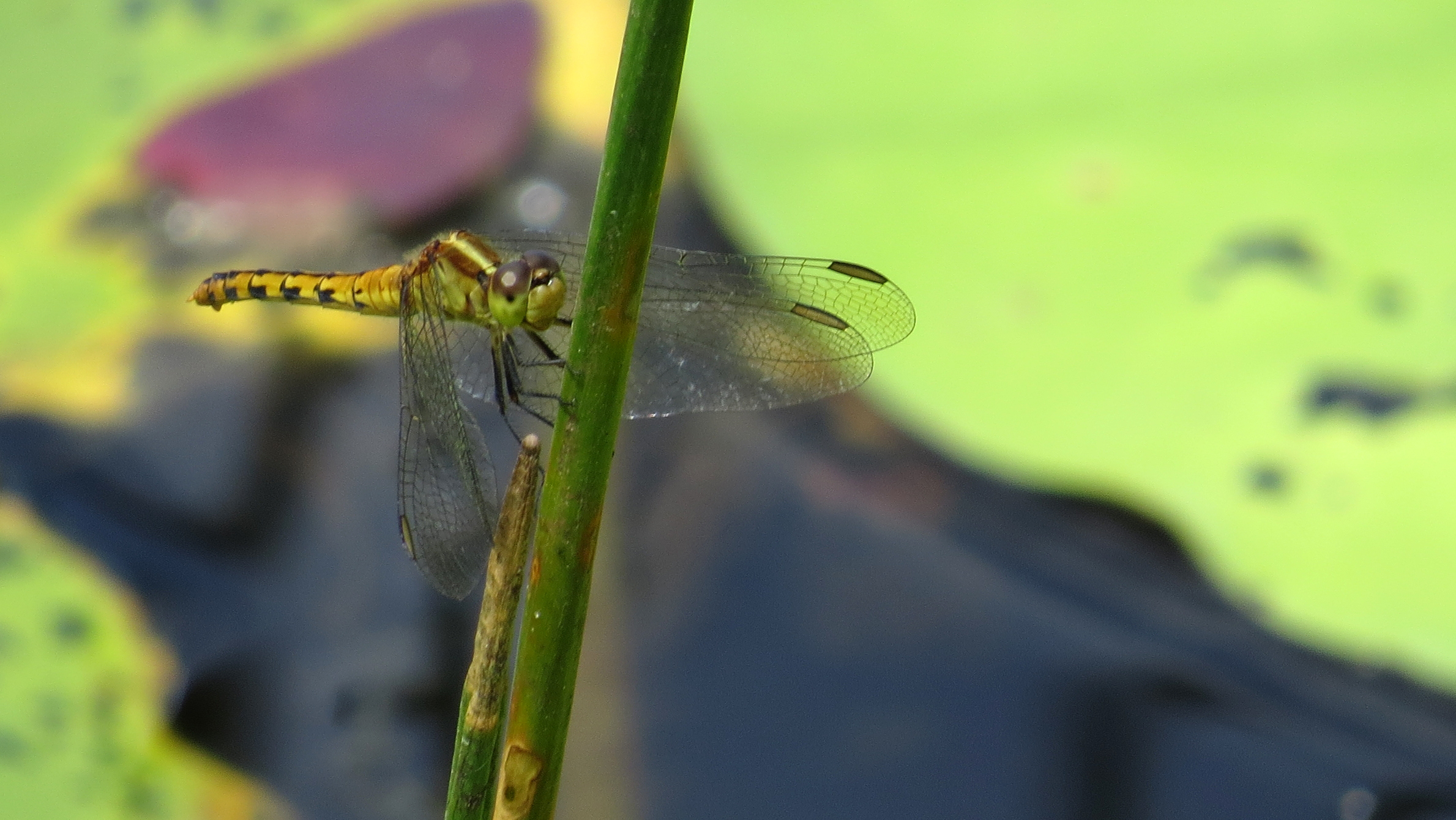
Female

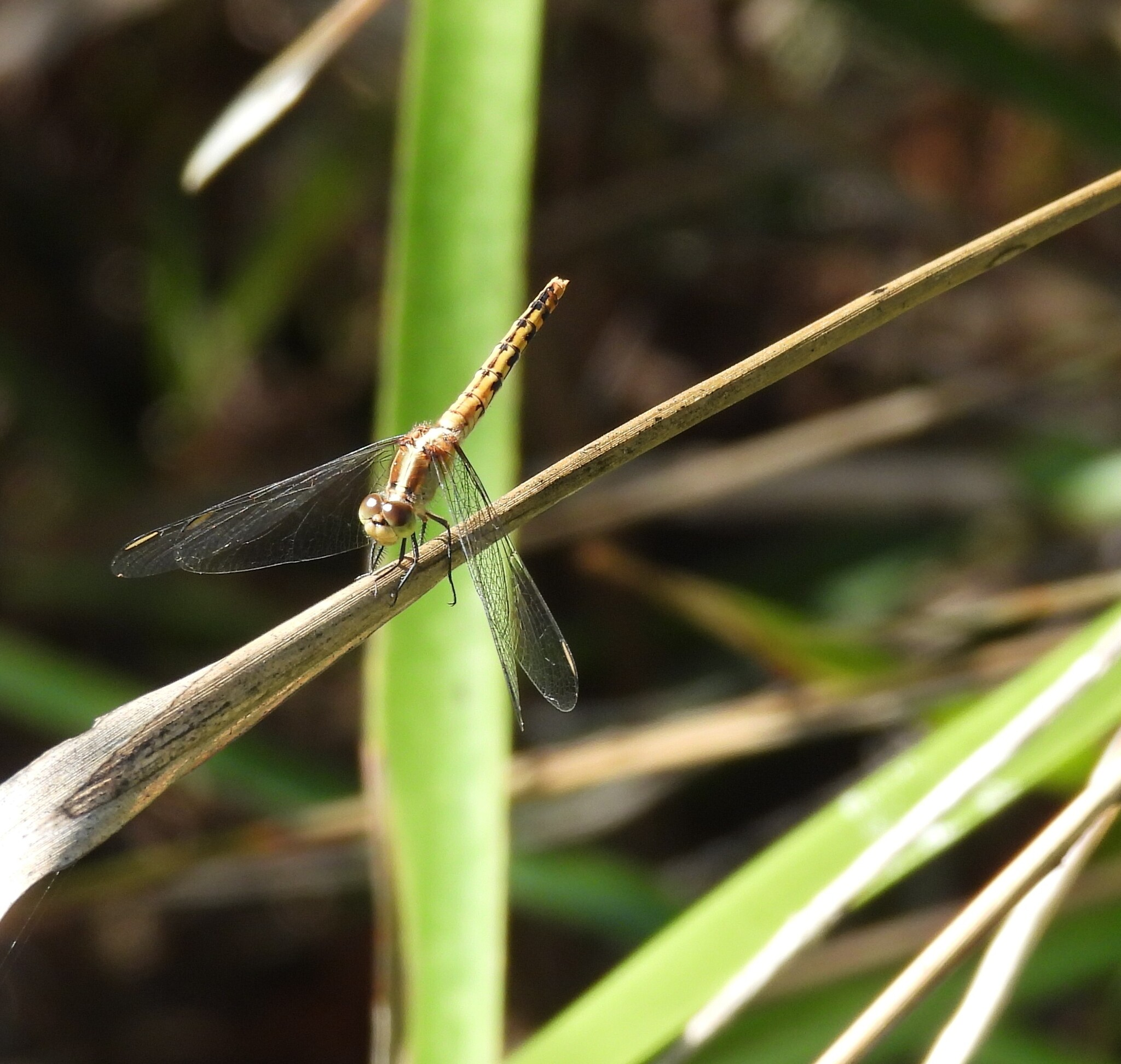
Female

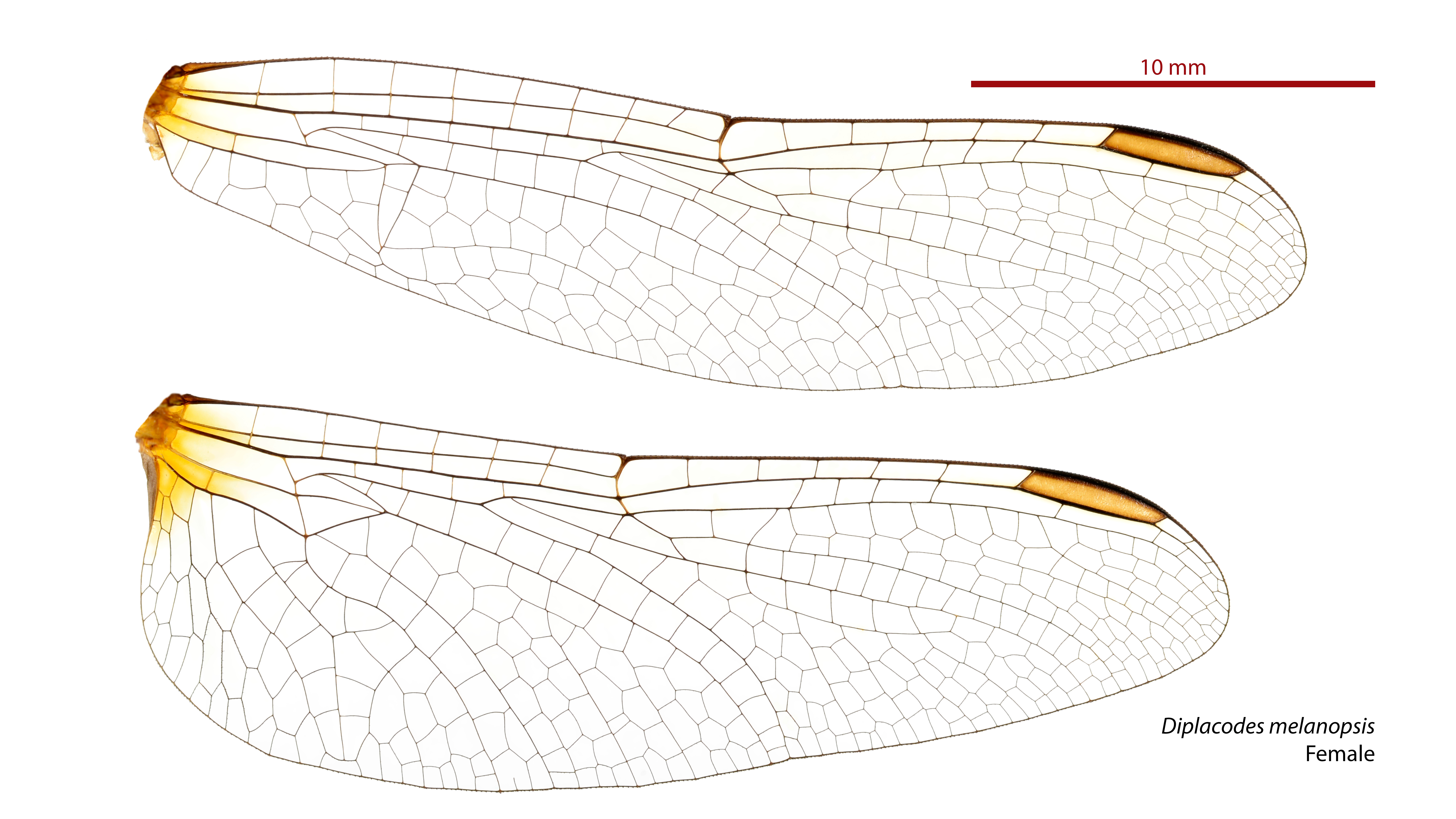
Female wings

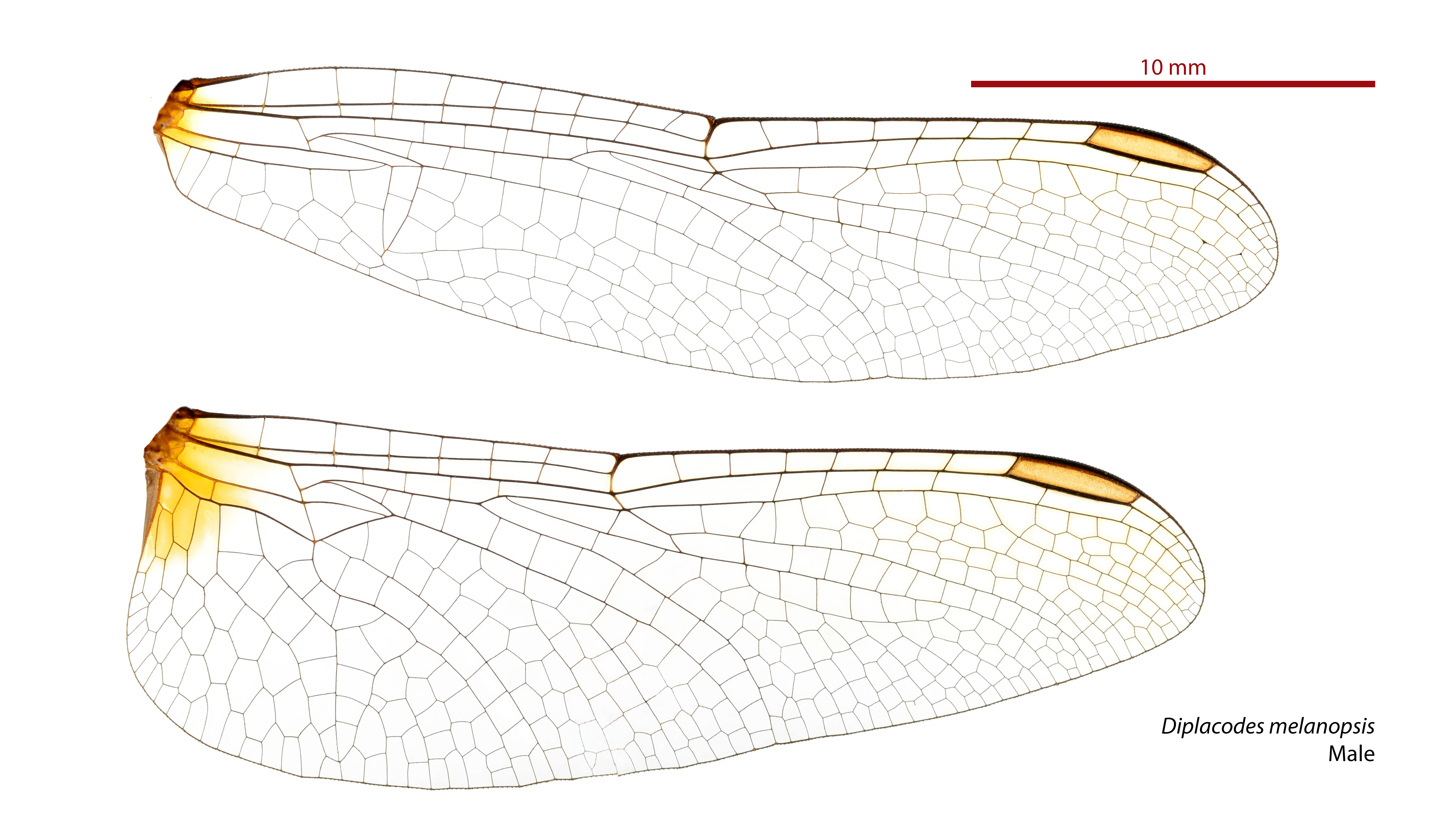
Male wings
