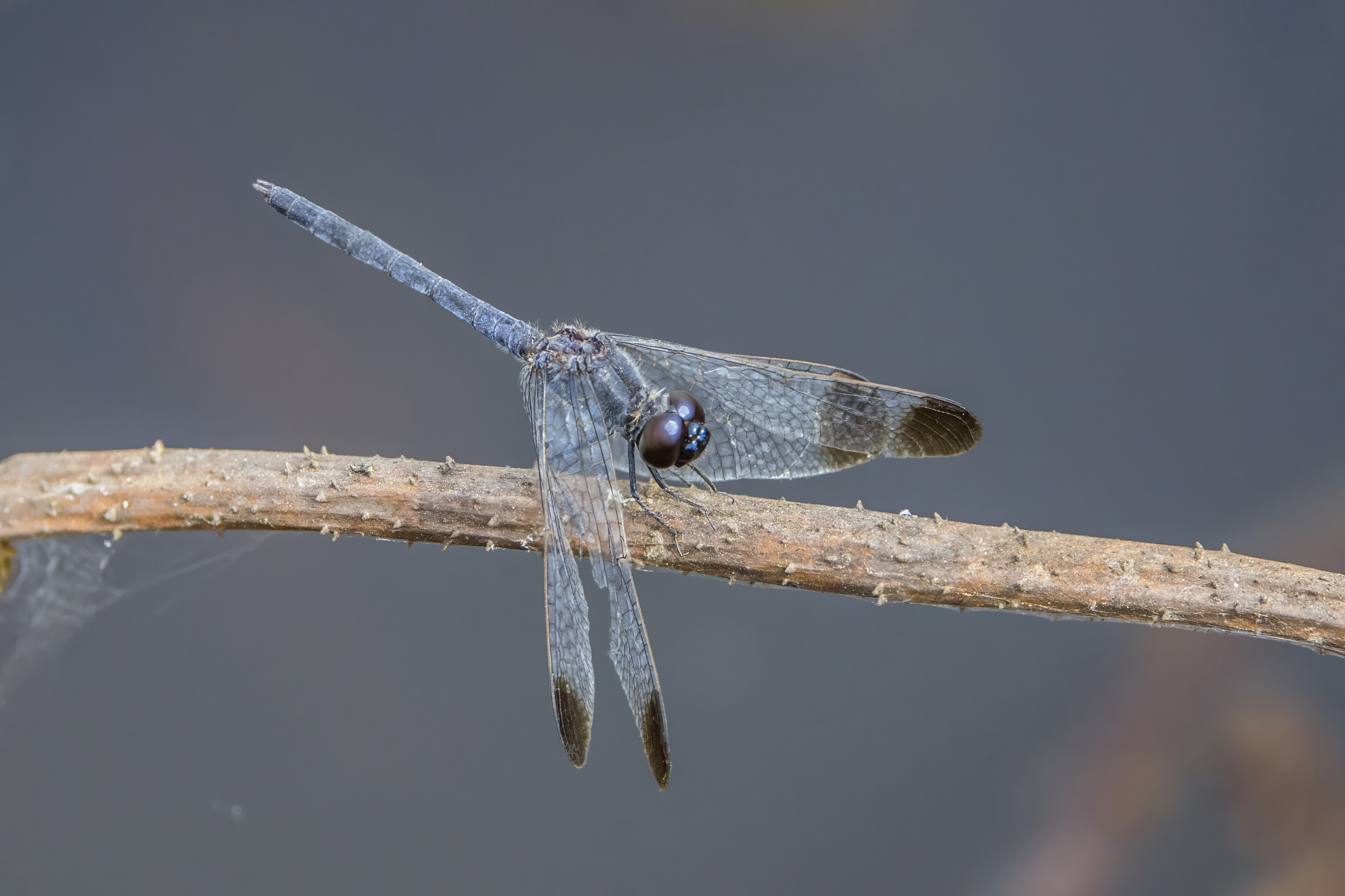
- Male
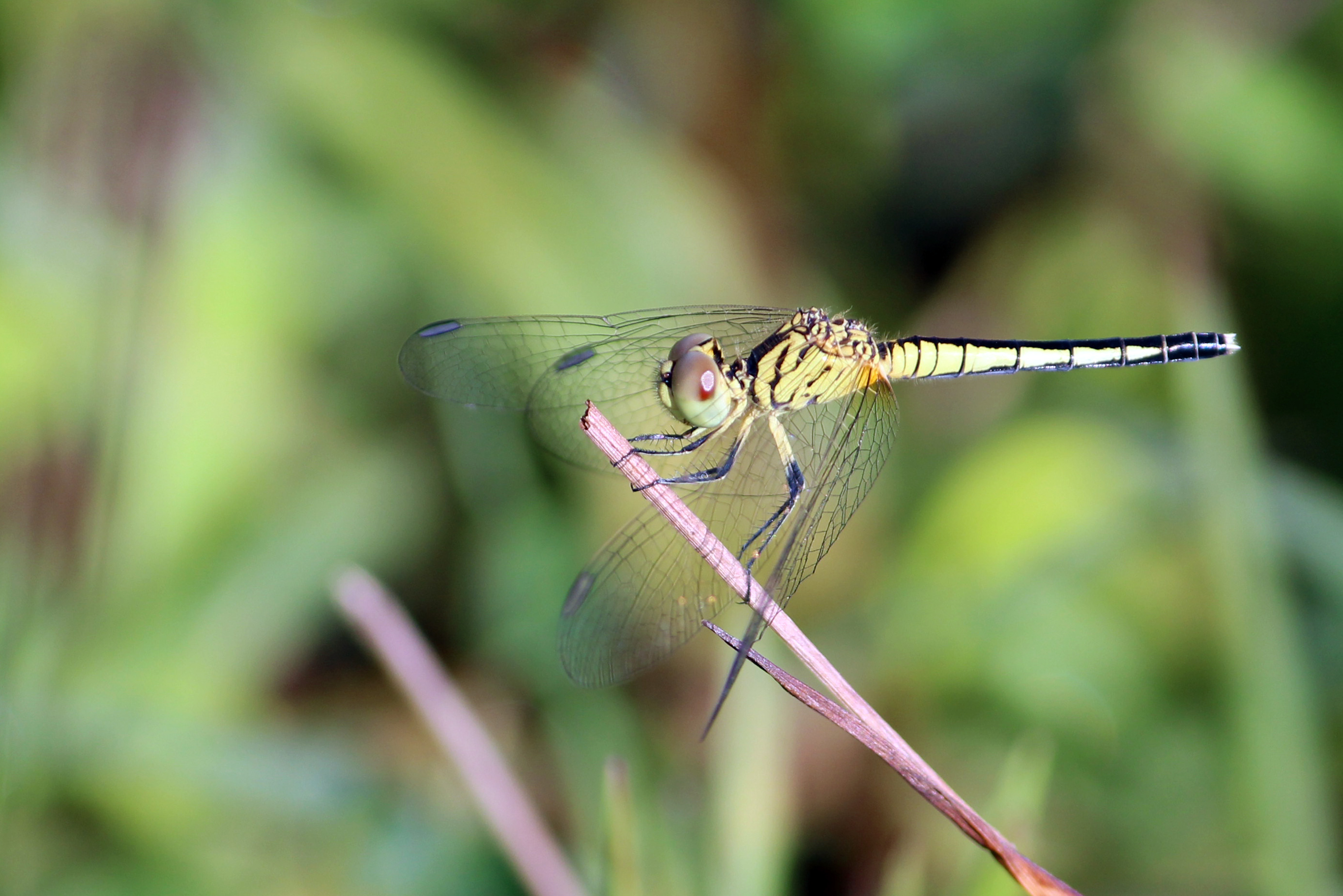
- Female

Conservation status
- Least Concern (IUCN 3.1)

Scientific classification
- Kingdom: Animalia
- Phylum: Arthropoda
- Clade: Pancrustacea
- Class: Insecta
- Order: Odonata
- Infraorder: Anisoptera
- Family: Libellulidae
- Genus: Diplacodes
- Species: D. nebulosa

Binomial name
- Diplacodes nebulosa (Fabricius, 1793)

Synonyms
- Libellula nebulosa Fabricius, 1793

= Diplacodes nebulosa =

Black-tipped percher

Species of dragonfly

Diplacodes nebulosa (the black-tipped percher, black-tipped ground skimmer or charcoal-winged percher) is a species of dragonfly in the family Libellulidae. It is a widely distributed species in many Asian countries. and northern Australia.

== Description and habitat ==
Diplacodes nebulosa is a very small and slender dragonfly. Males have a black abdomen and black wing tips; females are yellow and black, and their wings can be hyaline, or with an orange base, or, like the male, have black tips.

It prefers marshes and heavily weeded ponds.

== Etymology ==
The genus name Diplacodes combines Diplax, a genus name derived from the Greek δίς (dis, "twice") and πλάξ (plax, "flat and broad"), with the Greek suffix –ώδης (-ōdēs, "resembling" or "having the nature of"). The name refers to the similarity of the genus to Diplax and Diplacina.

The species name nebulosa is derived from the Latin nebulosus ("misty", "foggy" or "dark"), likely referring to the small black body or black wingtips.

== Gallery ==
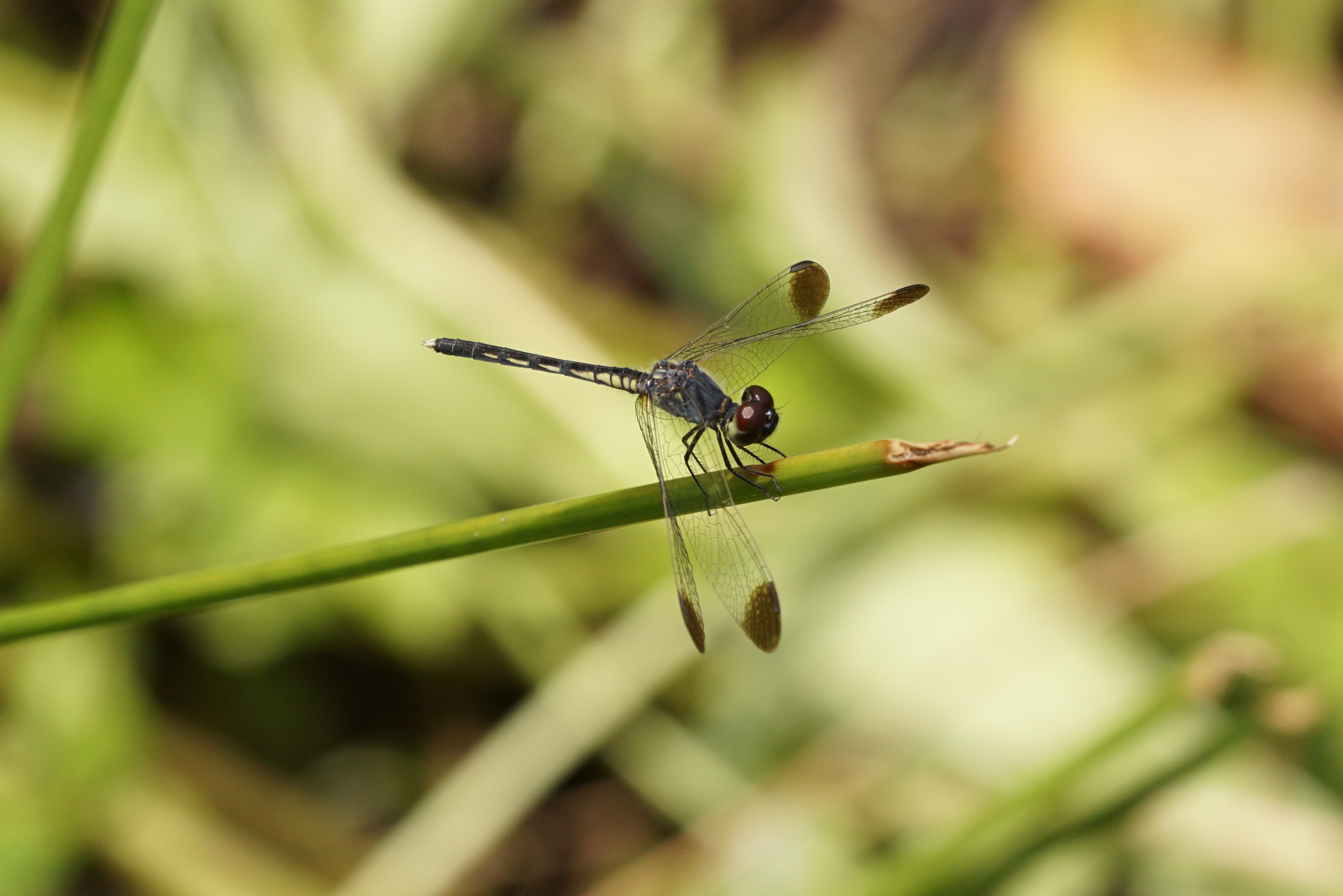
Male

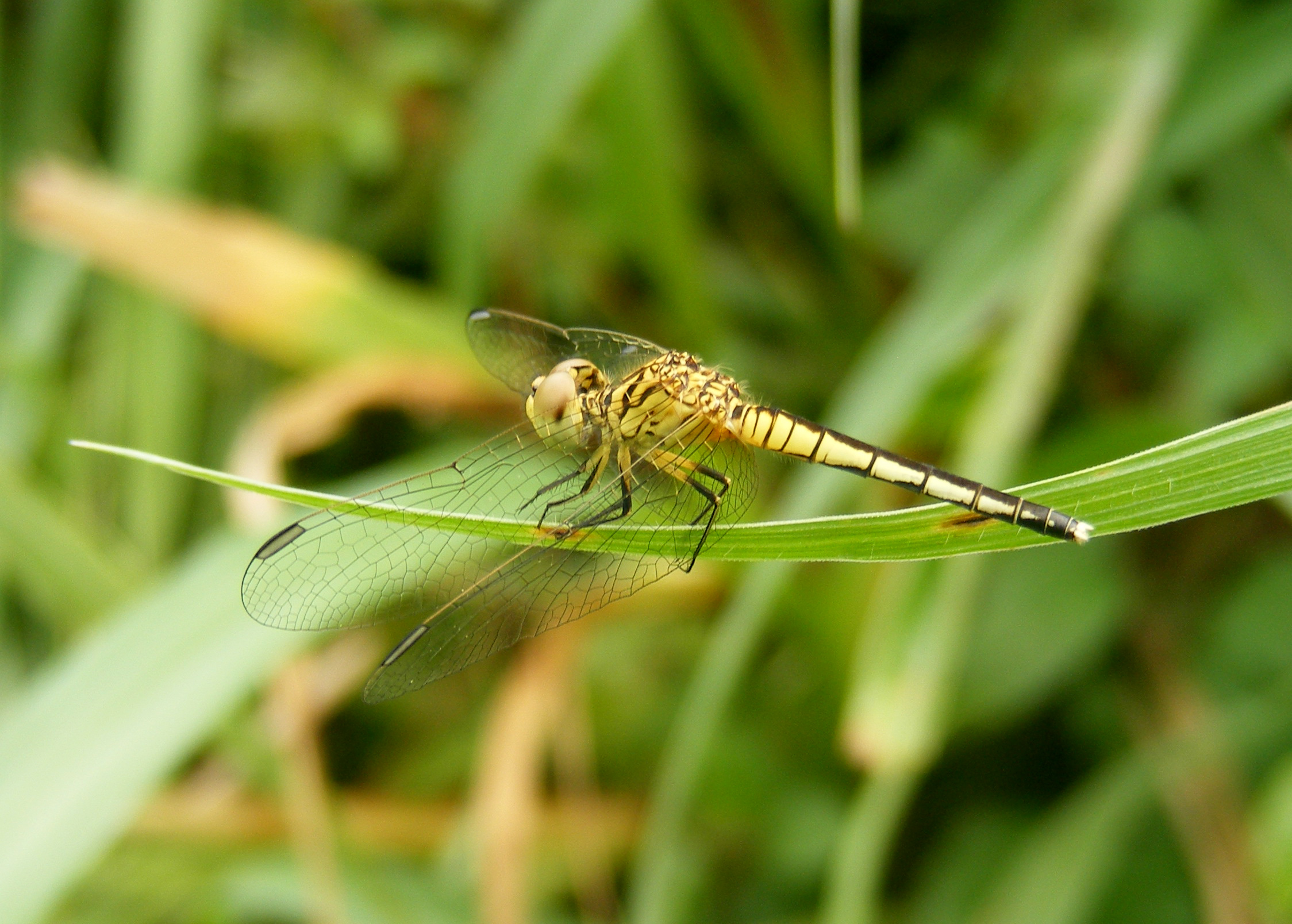
Female

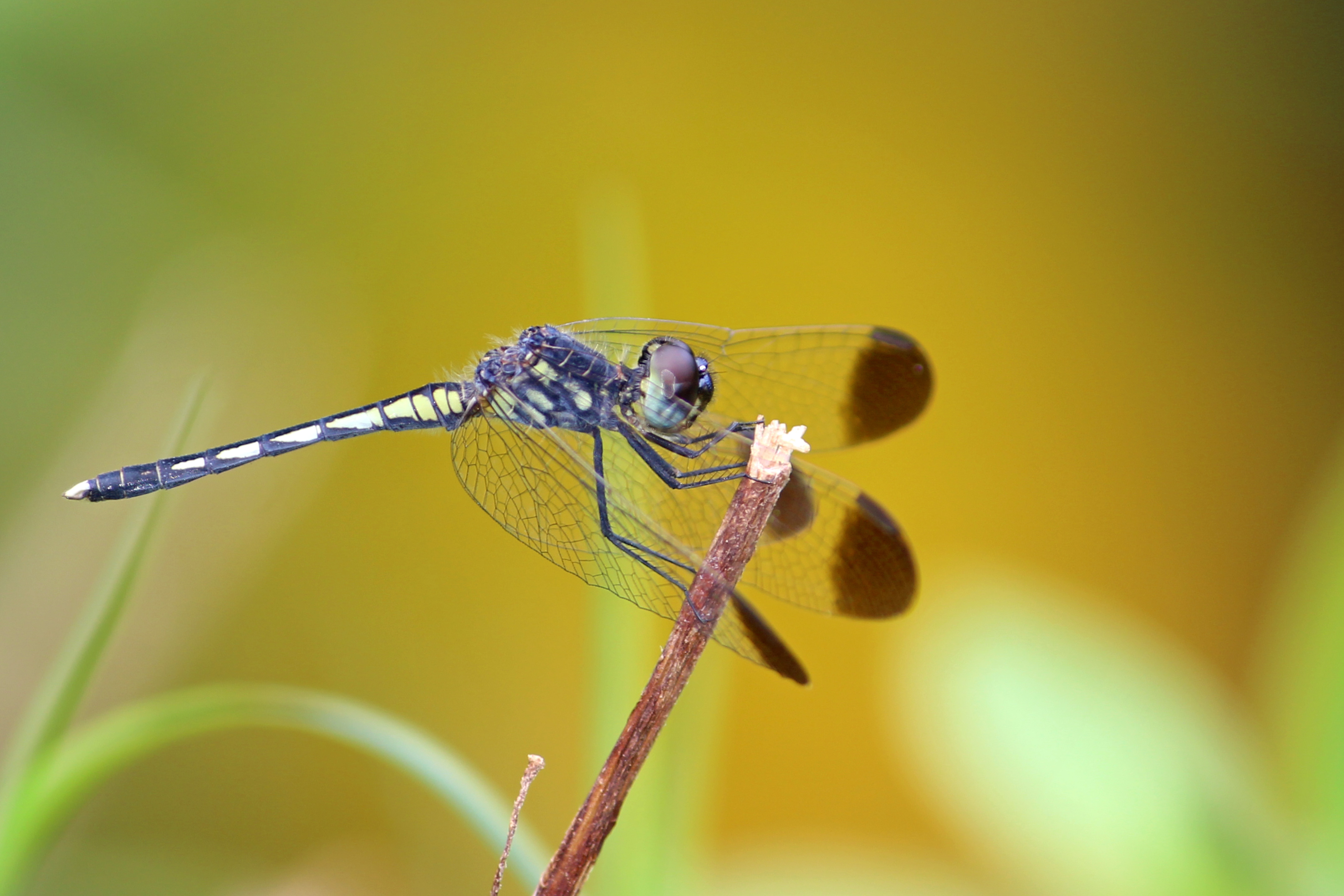
Sub-adult male

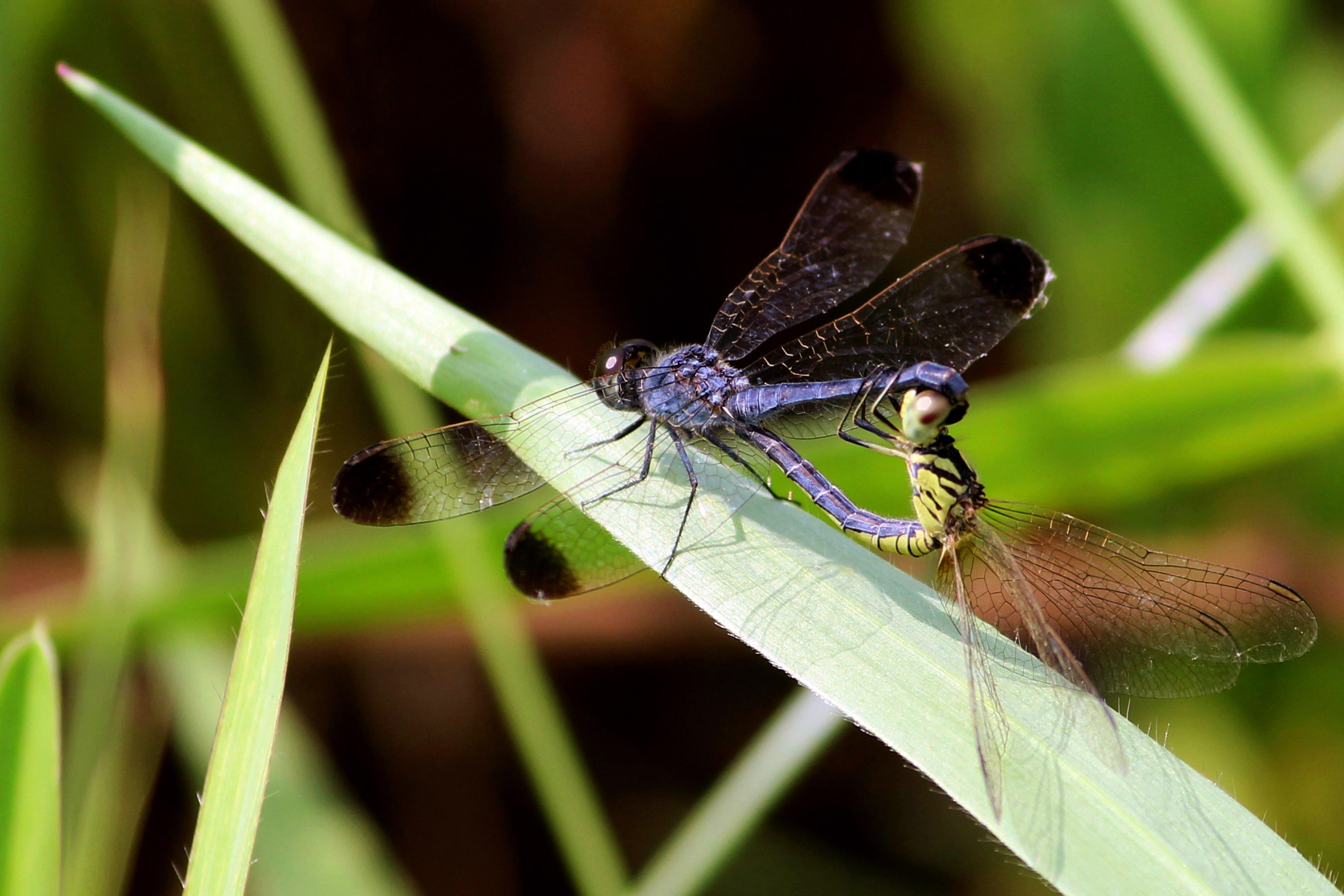
Mating pair

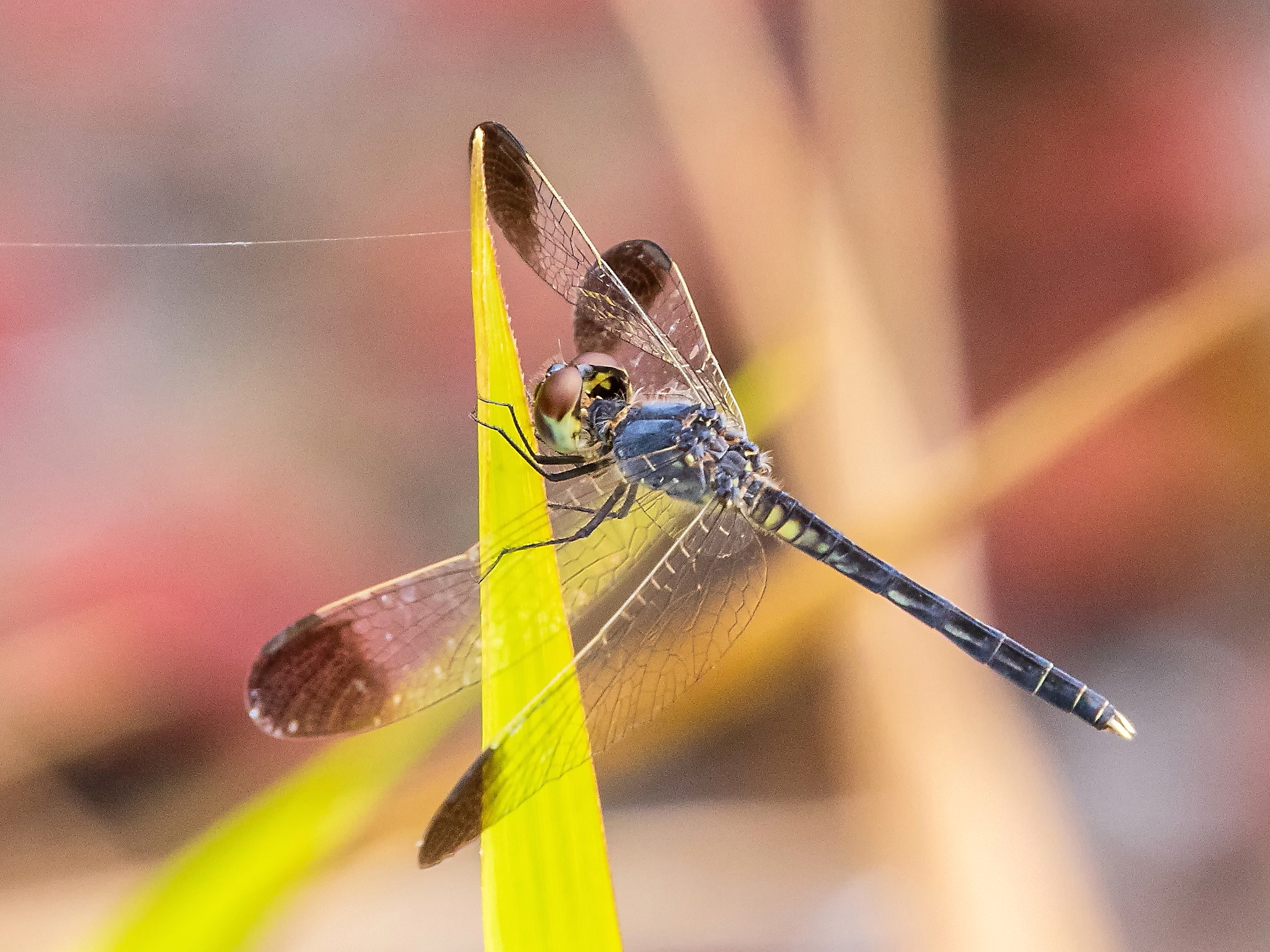
Male, north Queensland, Australia

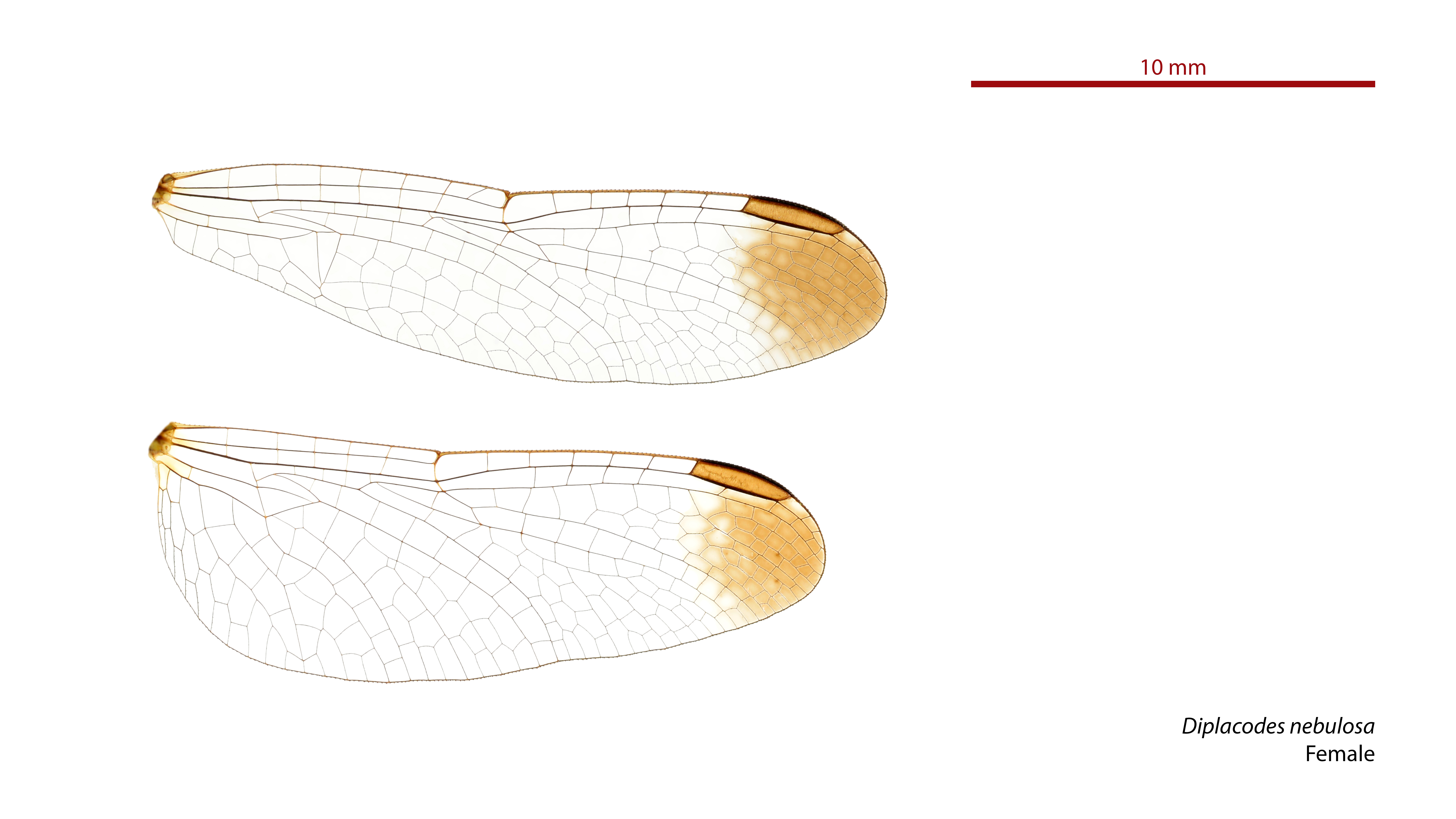
Female wings

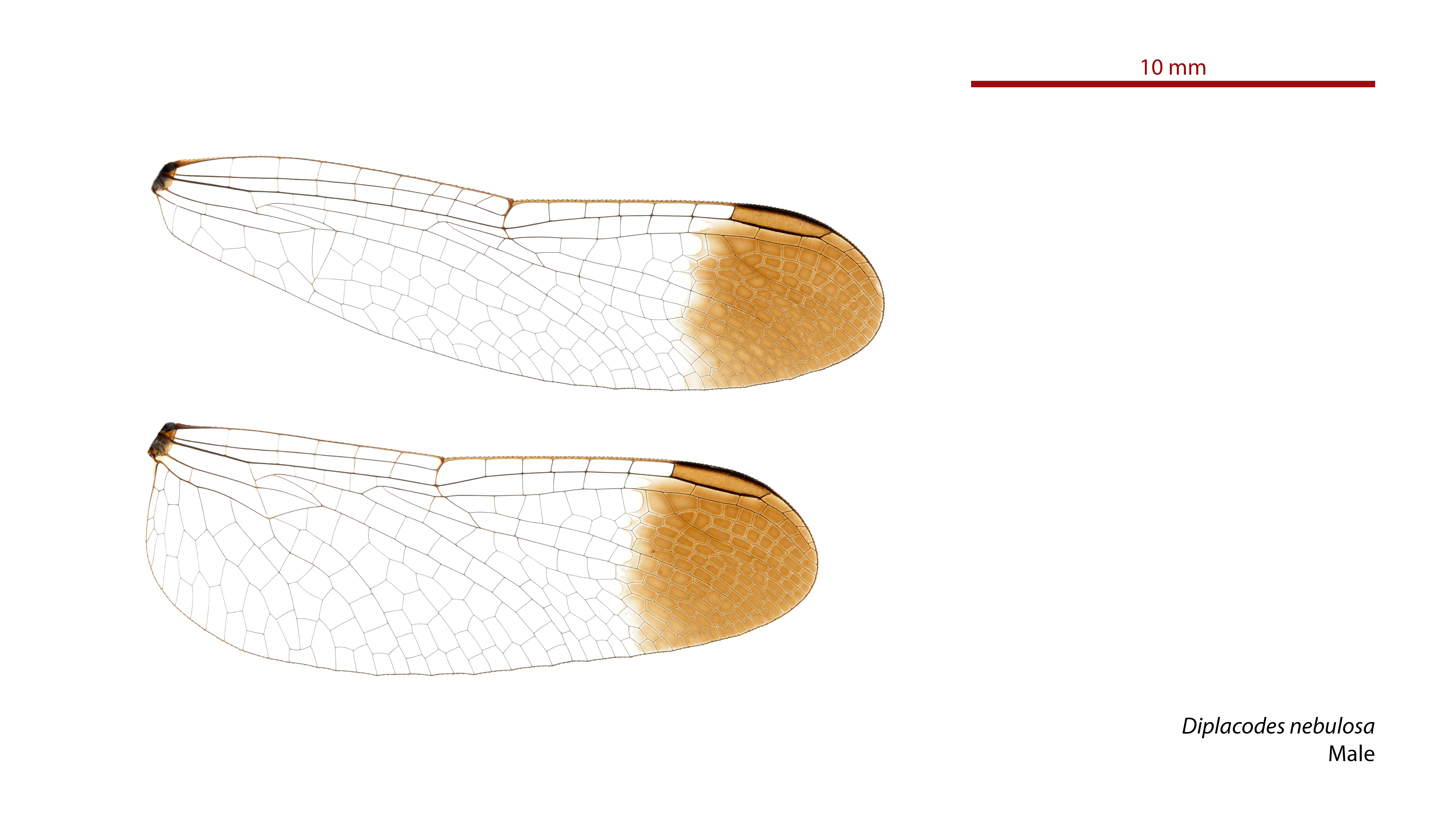
Male wings

== See also ==
- List of odonates of Sri Lanka
- List of odonates of India
- List of Odonata species of Australia
