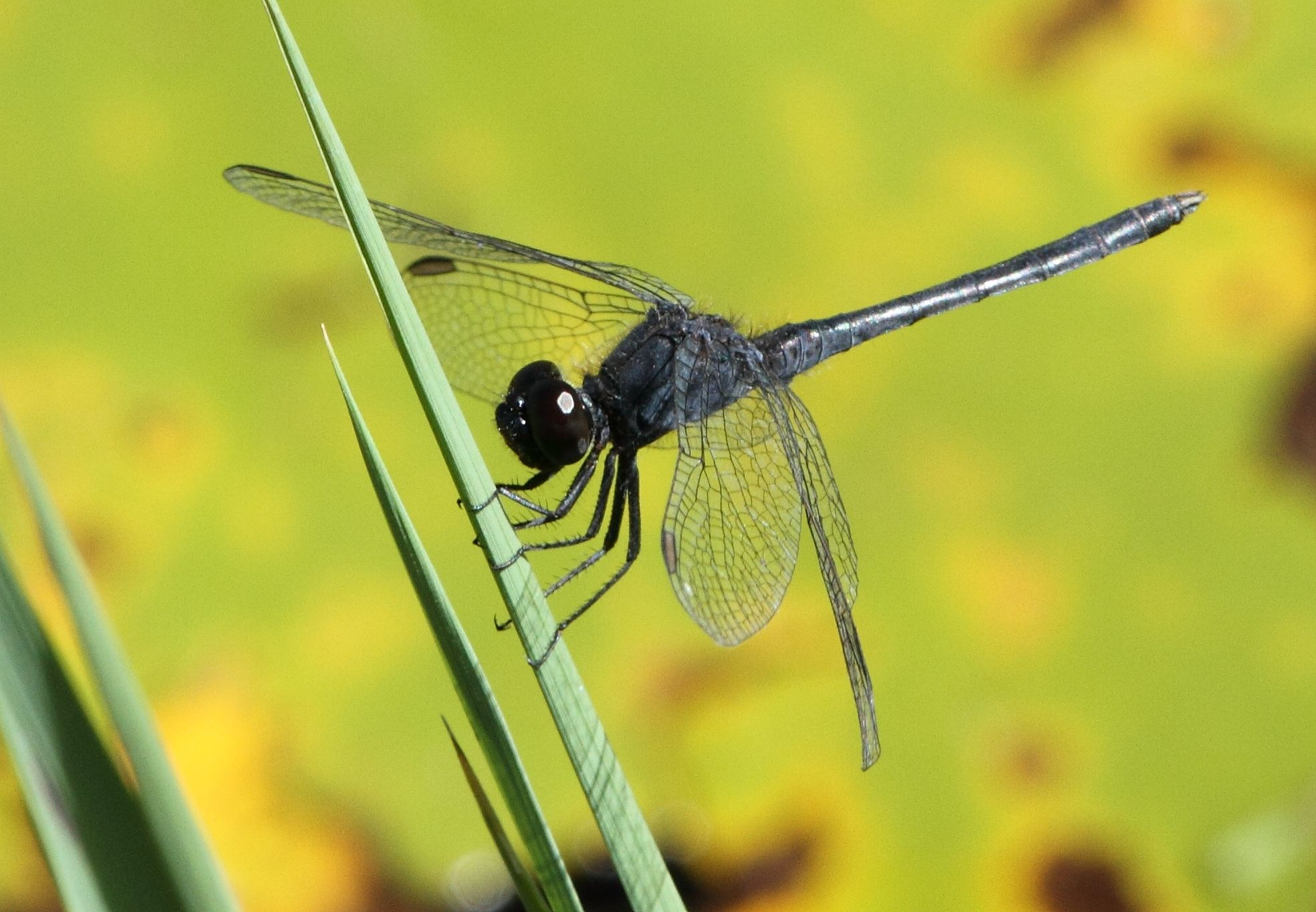
- Male

Conservation status
- Least Concern (IUCN 3.1)

Scientific classification
- Kingdom: Animalia
- Phylum: Arthropoda
- Class: Insecta
- Order: Odonata
- Infraorder: Anisoptera
- Family: Libellulidae
- Genus: Diplacodes
- Species: D. pumila

Binomial name
- Diplacodes pumila Dijkstra, 2006

Synonyms
- Diplacodes deminuta sensu Pinhey, 1976

= Diplacodes pumila =

Species of dragonfly

Diplacodes pumila, the dwarf percher, is a species of dragonfly in the family Libellulidae. It is found in the Democratic Republic of the Congo, Mozambique, South Africa, Tanzania, Zambia, and Zimbabwe. Its natural habitats are grassy margins of wetlands in moist savanna and grassland.

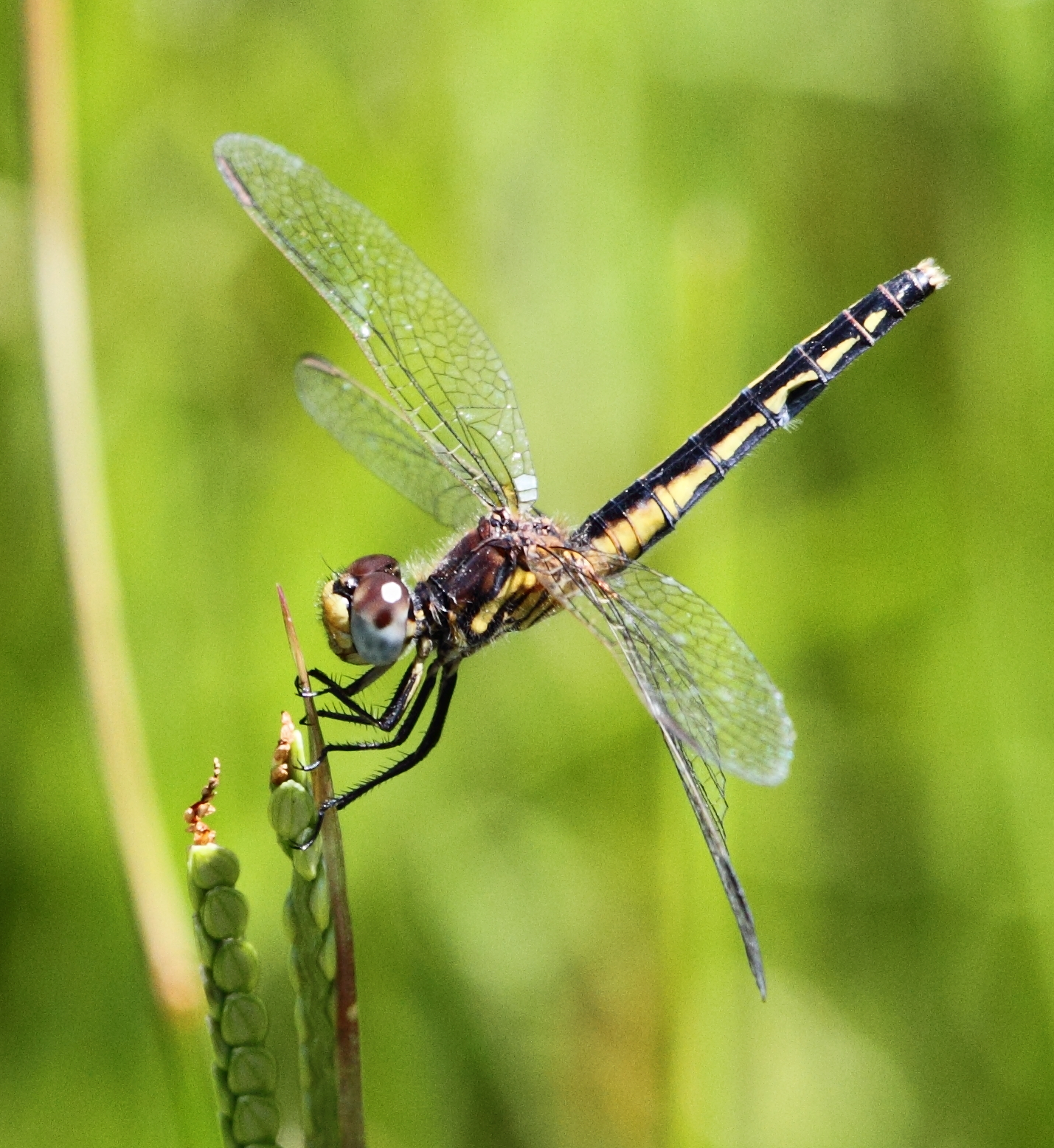
Female dwarf percher

This species is similar to Diplacodes lefebvrii, the black percher, but is much smaller, the hindwing being 17–18 mm long; that of Diplacodes lefebvrii is usually 22–23 mm long.
