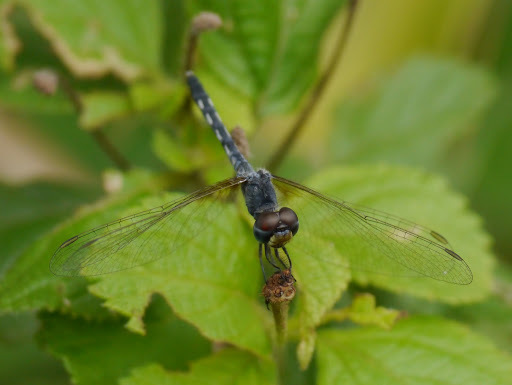
- Male in Gabon
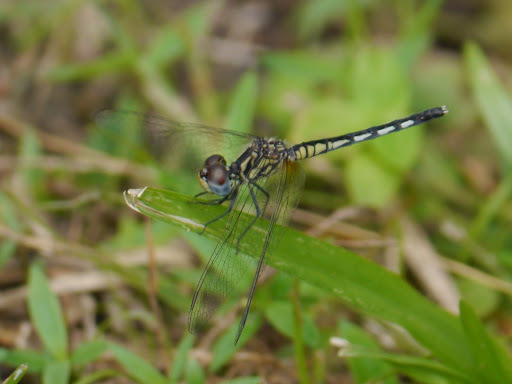
- Female in Gabon

Conservation status
- Least Concern (IUCN 3.1)

Scientific classification
- Kingdom: Animalia
- Phylum: Arthropoda
- Clade: Pancrustacea
- Class: Insecta
- Order: Odonata
- Infraorder: Anisoptera
- Superfamily: Libelluloidea
- Family: Libellulidae
- Genus: Diplacodes
- Species: D. deminuta

Binomial name
- Diplacodes deminuta Lieftinck, 1969

= Diplacodes deminuta =

Species of dragonfly

Diplacodes deminuta is a species of dragonfly in the family Libellulidae known commonly as the little percher or tiny percher. It is native to much of Central Africa, where it is widespread. It lives in swampy habitat. As a species it is not generally threatened, but it is affected by human activity, such as spraying for tsetse fly control.

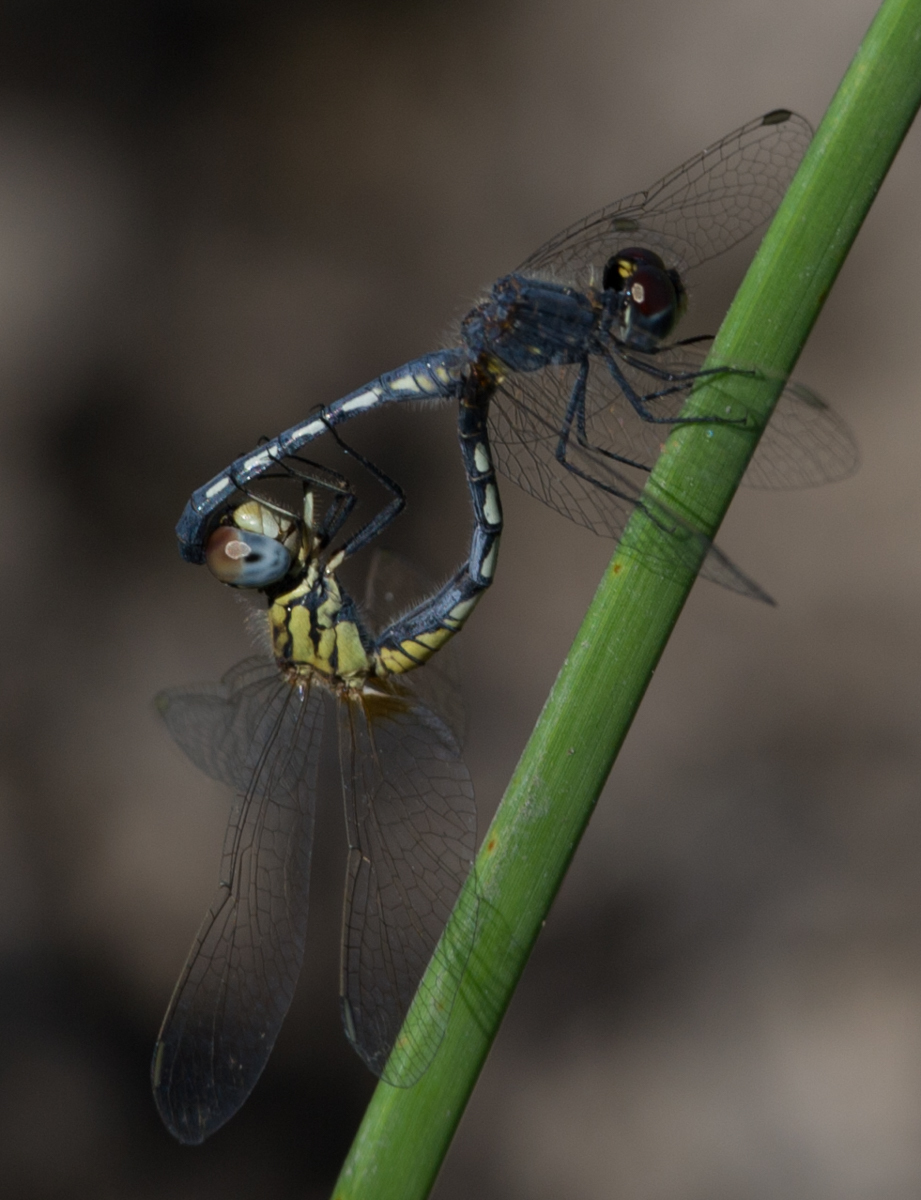
Mating wheel in Botswana

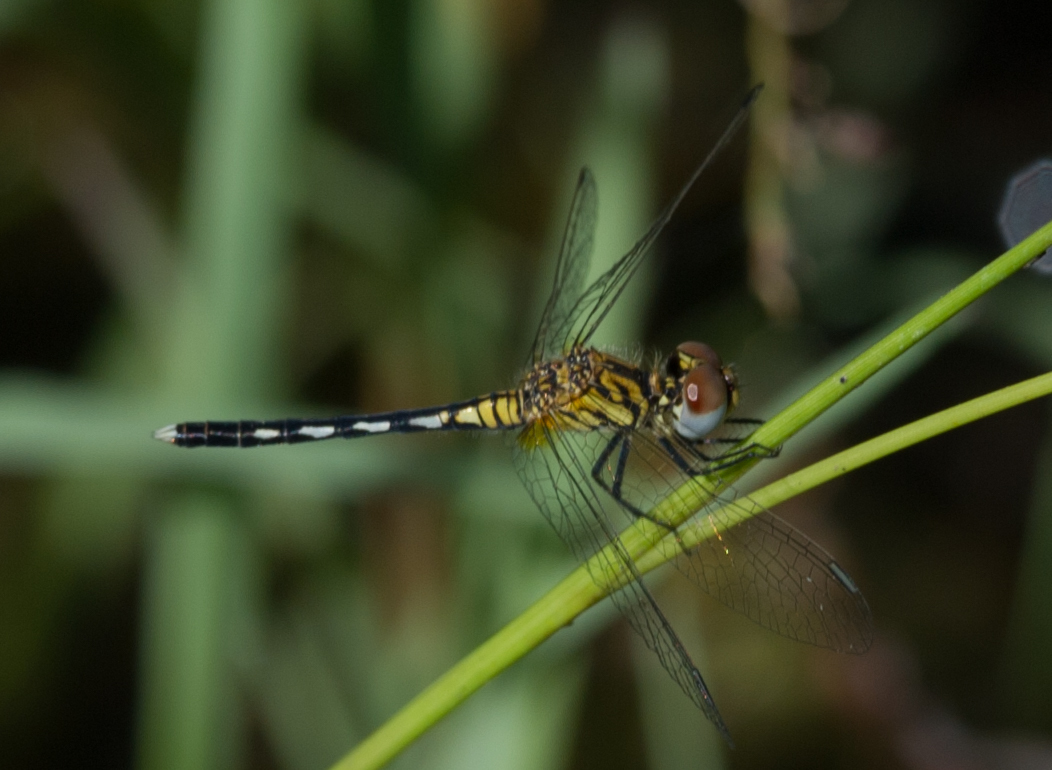
Immature male in Botswana
