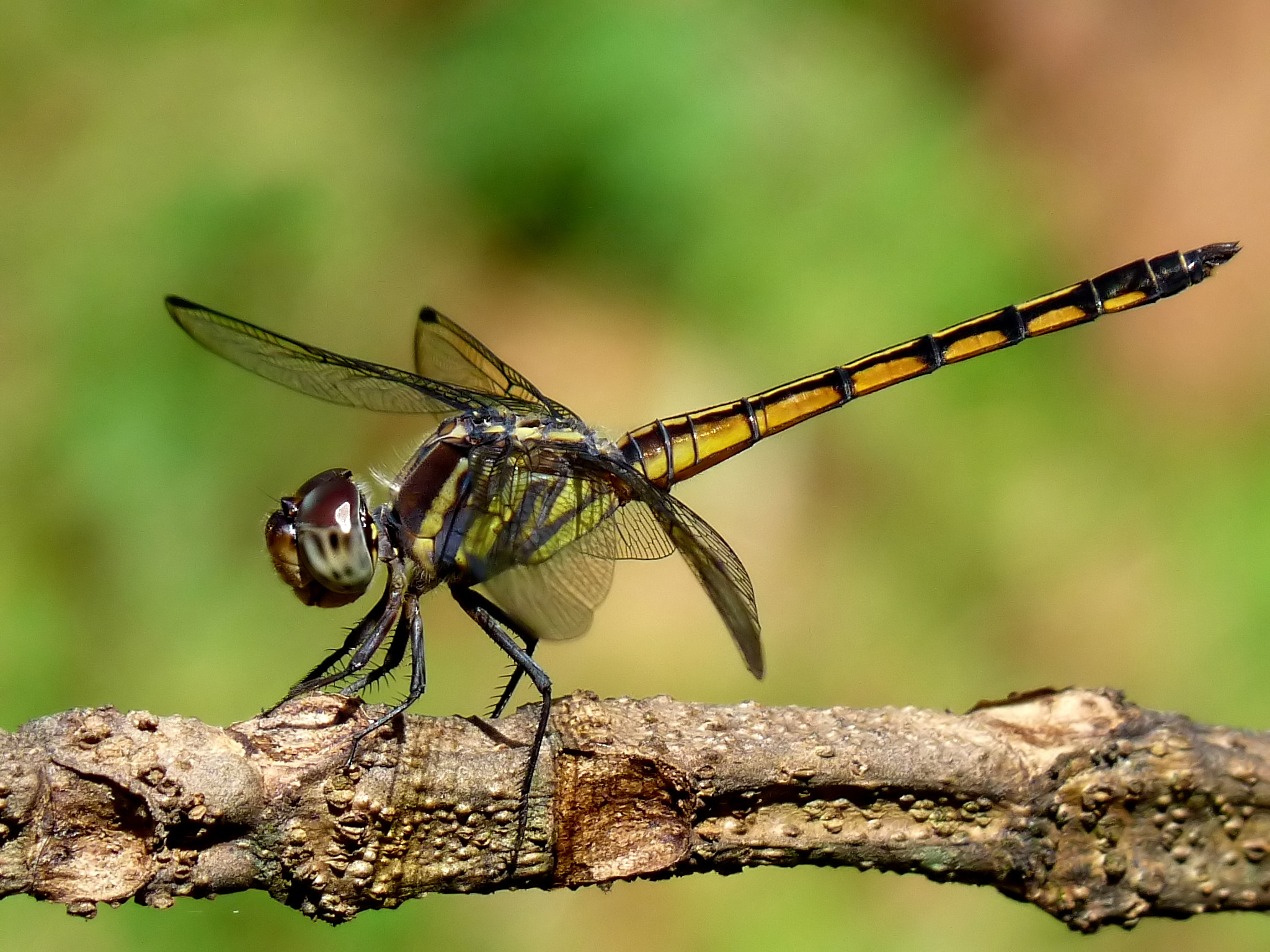
- Potamarcha congener

Scientific classification
- Kingdom: Animalia
- Phylum: Arthropoda
- Clade: Pancrustacea
- Class: Insecta
- Order: Odonata
- Infraorder: Anisoptera
- Superfamily: Libelluloidea
- Family: Libellulidae
- Subfamily: Libellulinae
- Genus: Potamarcha; Karsch, 1890

Diversity
- 2 species

= Potamarcha =

Genus of dragonflies

Potamarcha is a genus of dragonfly in the family Libellulidae. Species of Potamarcha are medium-sized dragonflies found in southern Asia and Australia. Potamarcha was first described by Ferdinand Karsch in 1890.

== Etymology ==
The genus name Potamarcha is derived from the Greek ποταμός (potamos, "river") and ἀρχός (arkhos, "chief" or "leader").

== Species ==
The genus Potamarcha includes two species:.

Male	Female	Scientific name	Common name	Distribution
		Potamarcha congener (Rambur, 1842)	yellow-tailed ashy skimmer, common chaser, or swampwatcher	South Asia, South-East Asia, and Oceania
		Potamarcha puella Needham, 1930		China
