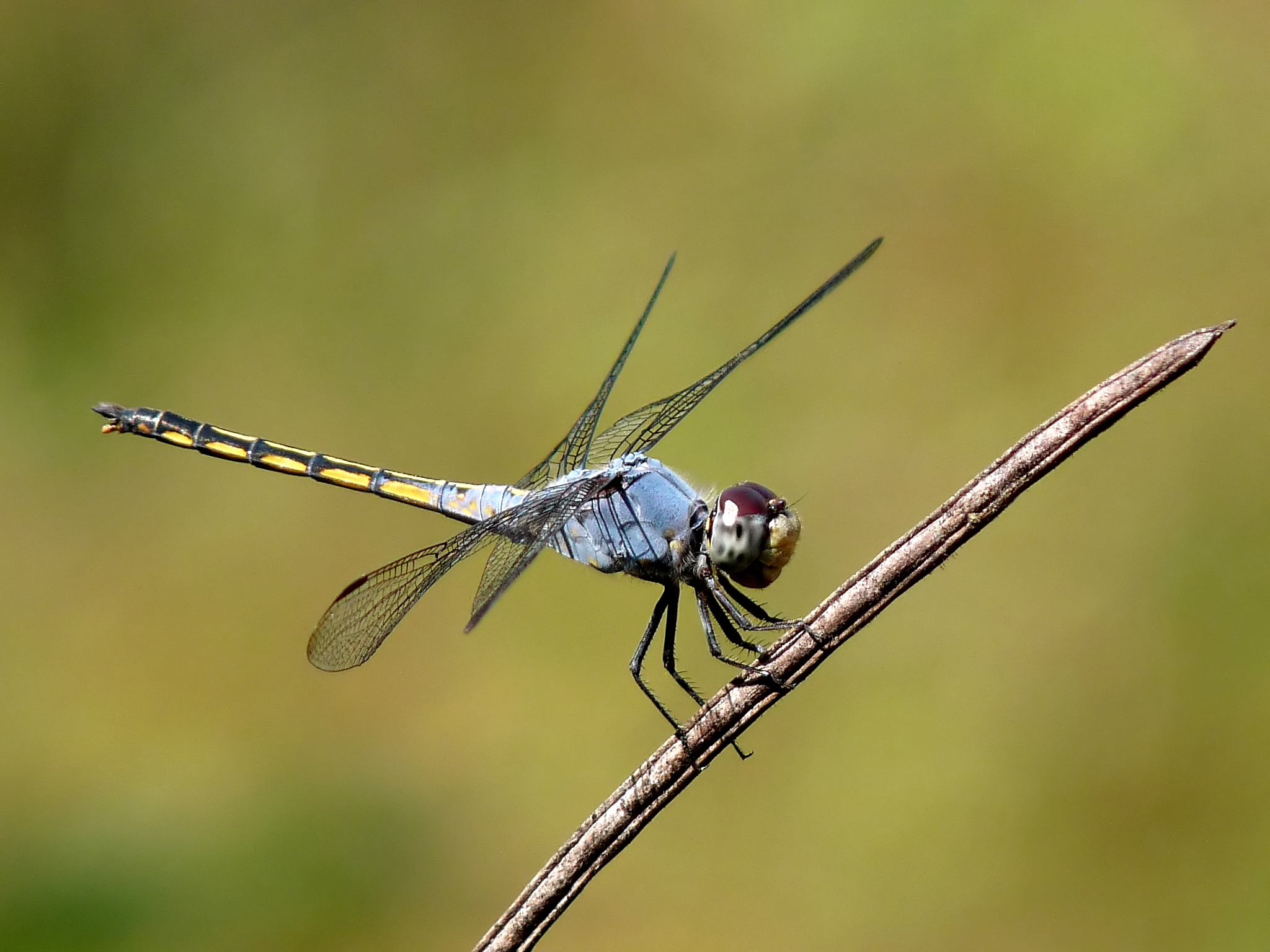
- Male in Kadavoor, India
- Female in Pune, India

Conservation status
- Least Concern (IUCN 3.1)

Scientific classification
- Kingdom: Animalia
- Phylum: Arthropoda
- Clade: Pancrustacea
- Class: Insecta
- Order: Odonata
- Infraorder: Anisoptera
- Family: Libellulidae
- Genus: Potamarcha
- Species: P. congener

Binomial name
- Potamarcha congener (Rambur, 1842)

Synonyms
- Libellula congener Rambur, 1842; Libellula obscura Rambur, 1842

= Potamarcha congener =

Species of dragonfly

Potamarcha congener is also known as the yellow-tailed ashy skimmer, common chaser, or swampwatcher. It is a species of dragonfly in the family Libellulidae, and was first described by Jules Pierre Rambur in 1842, almost fifty years before Ferdinand Karsch described its genus. Potamarcha congener is one of two species making up the genus Potamarcha, together with Potamarcha puella.

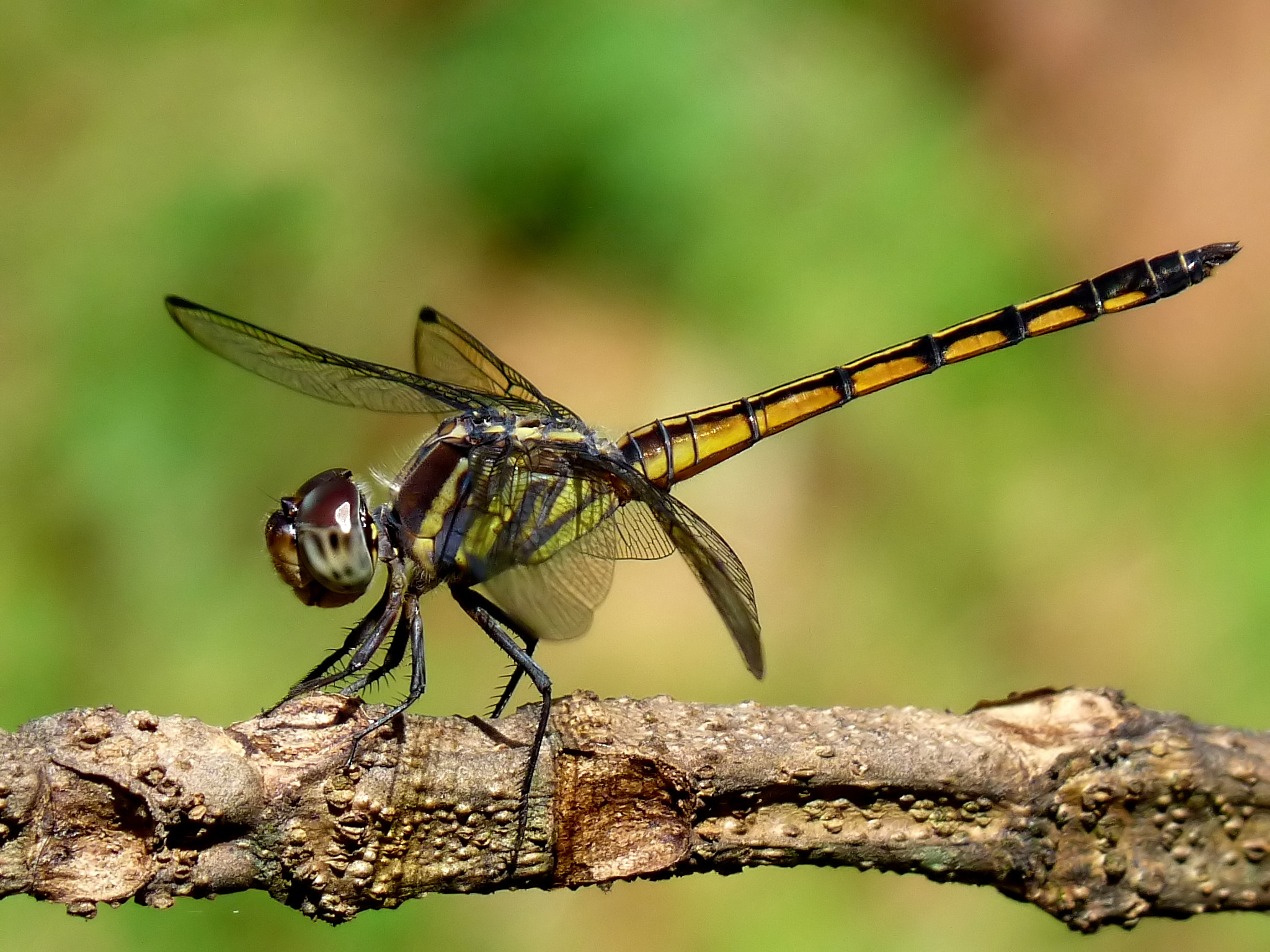
Juvenile male in Kadavoor, India

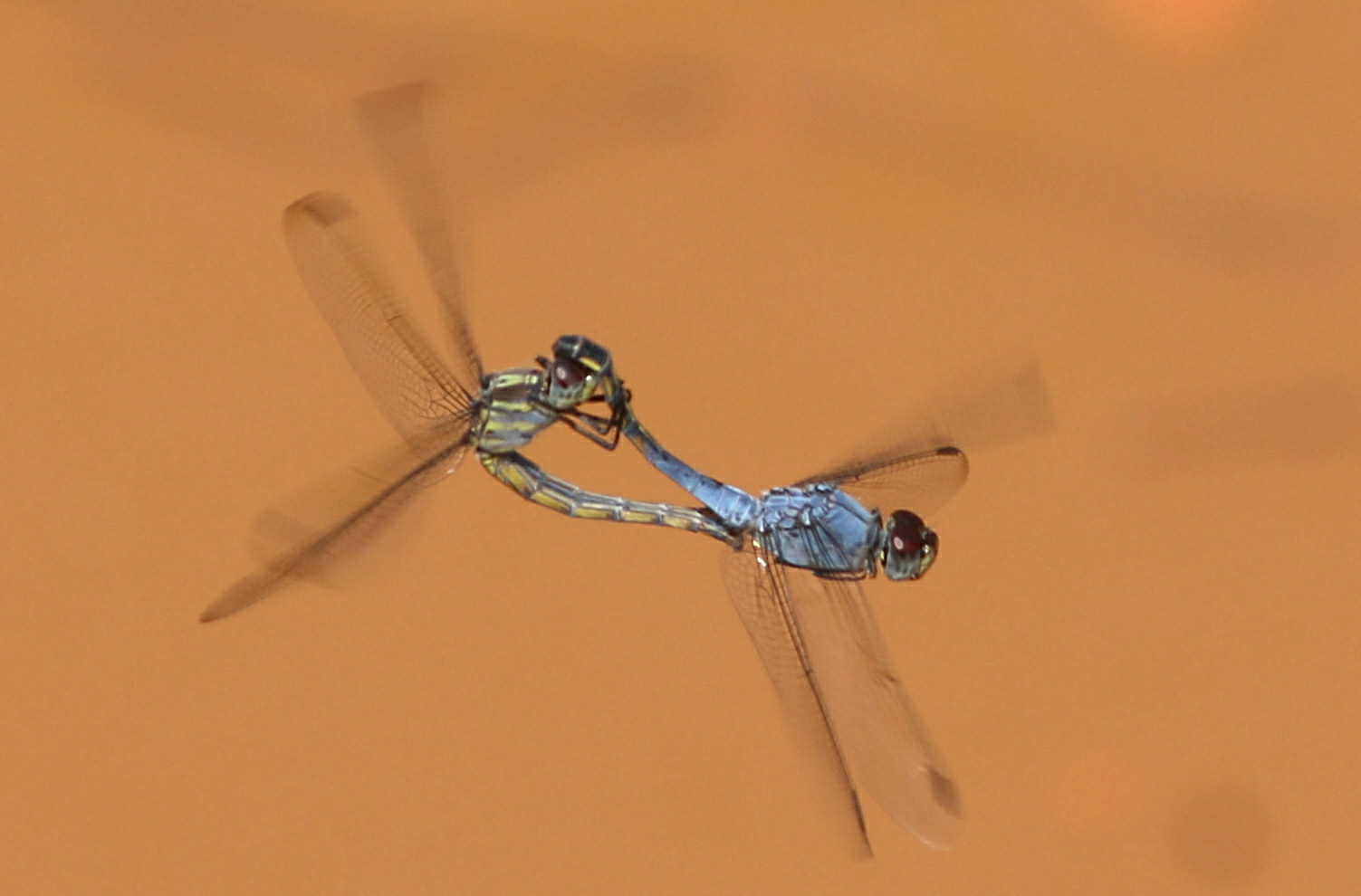
Yellow tailed ashy skimmer - Potamarcha congener

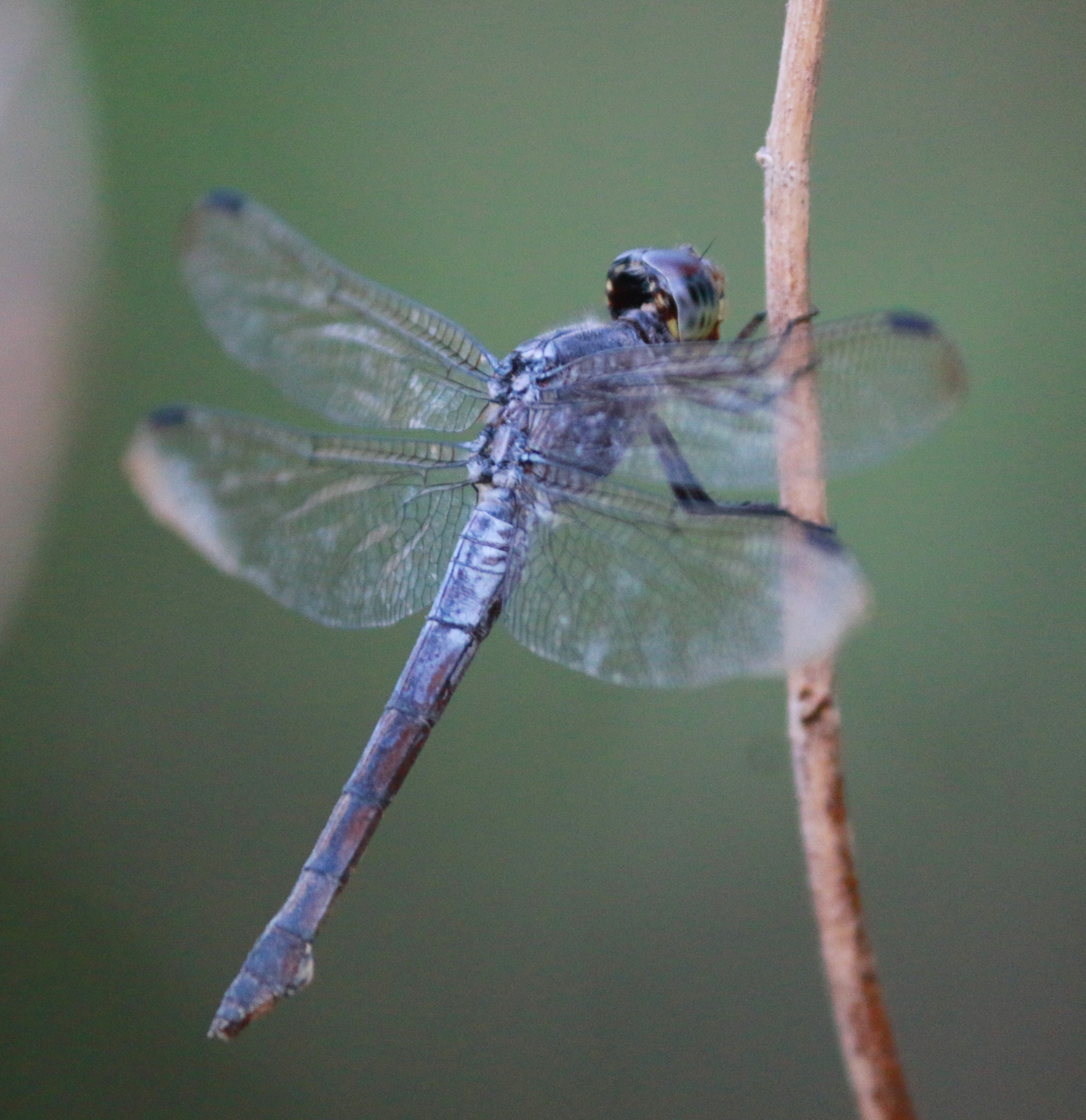
Yellow tailed ashy skimmer, Potamarcha congener, aged

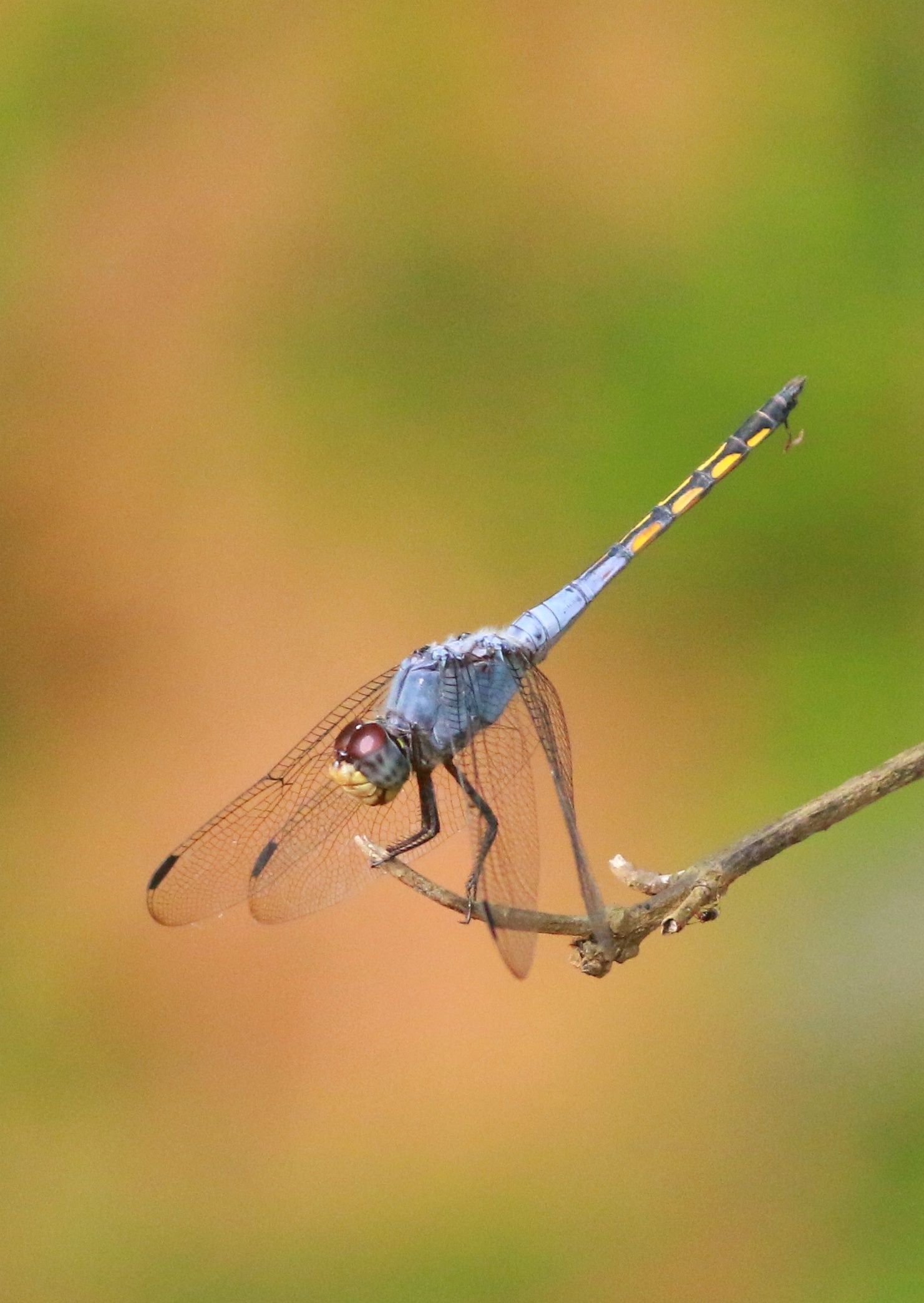
Yellow tailed ashy skimmer, Potamarcha congener

== Distribution ==
Potamarcha congener is common through much of its range, which stretches through parts of South Asia, South-East Asia, and Oceania, including in countries such as India, Indonesia, China, Australia, and Vietnam. Owing to its wide distribution, the species has been classified as Least Concern by the International Union for Conservation of Nature.

== Description and habitat ==
Potamarcha congener is a medium-sized dragonfly with a bluish black thorax and yellow tail with black markings. Face is olivaceous yellow to steel black or brown. Eyes are reddish brown above and bluish grey below. In male adults, the thorax and first four segments of the abdomen are covered with bluish pruinescence. In young adults, yellow markings are visible through the pruinescence. The rest of the abdomen is black with orange markings, with the last two segments entirely black. The female thorax has yellow and black stripes on the sides. The abdomen is black with dull orange markings, and has prominent flaps on each side of segment eight. The flaps may serve to hold the eggs in place during oviposition.

This dragonfly is found in terrestrial areas with standing water. This can include near small ponds, rice fields or marshes where it breeds.

== Etymology ==
The genus name Potamarcha is derived from the Greek ποταμός (potamos, "river") and ἀρχός (arkhos, "chief" or "leader").

The species name congener is Latin for "of the same kind" or "closely related", possibly referring to its similarity to another species of the same genus.

== Gallery ==
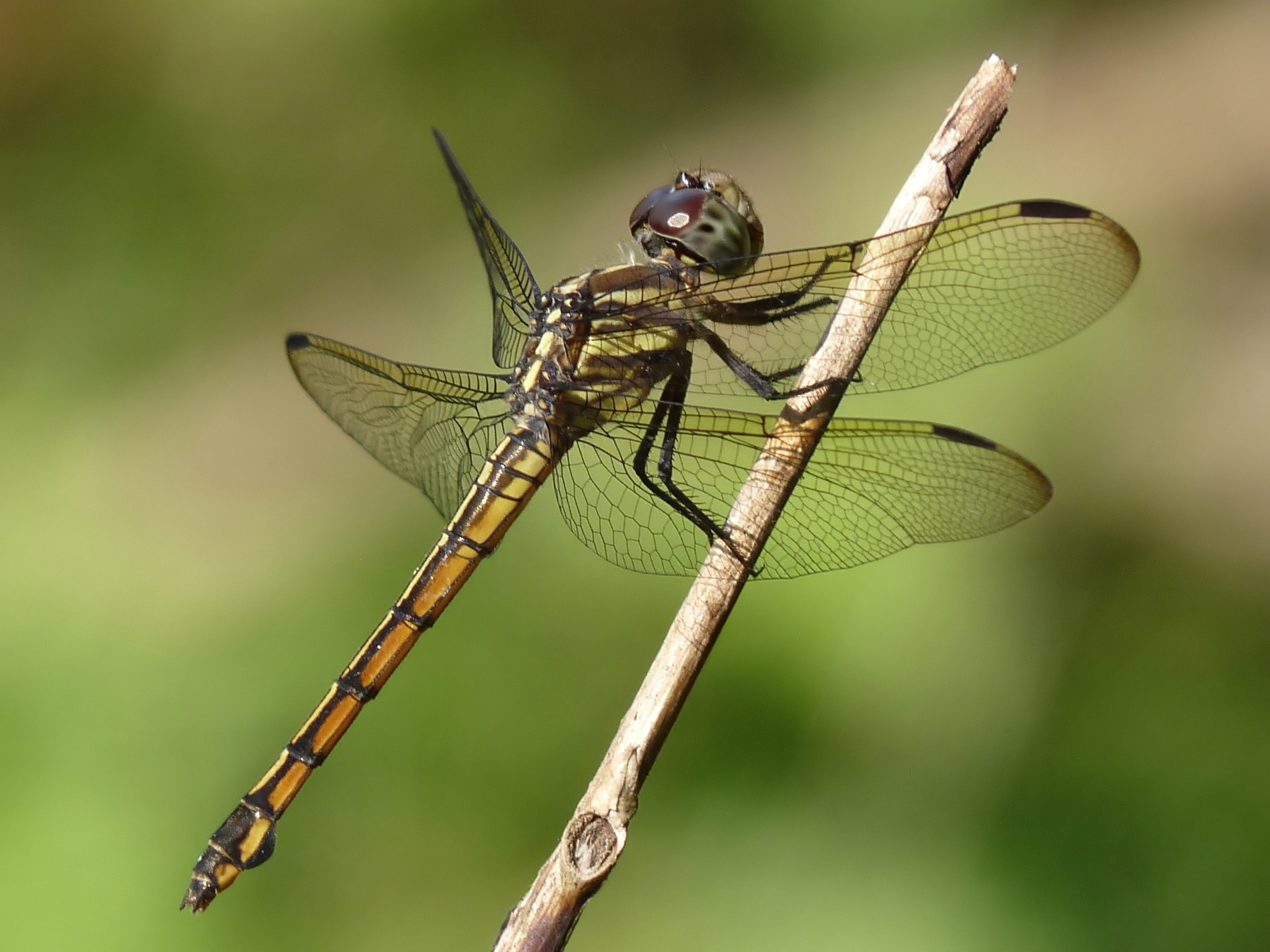
Female (note the prominent flaps on segment eight)

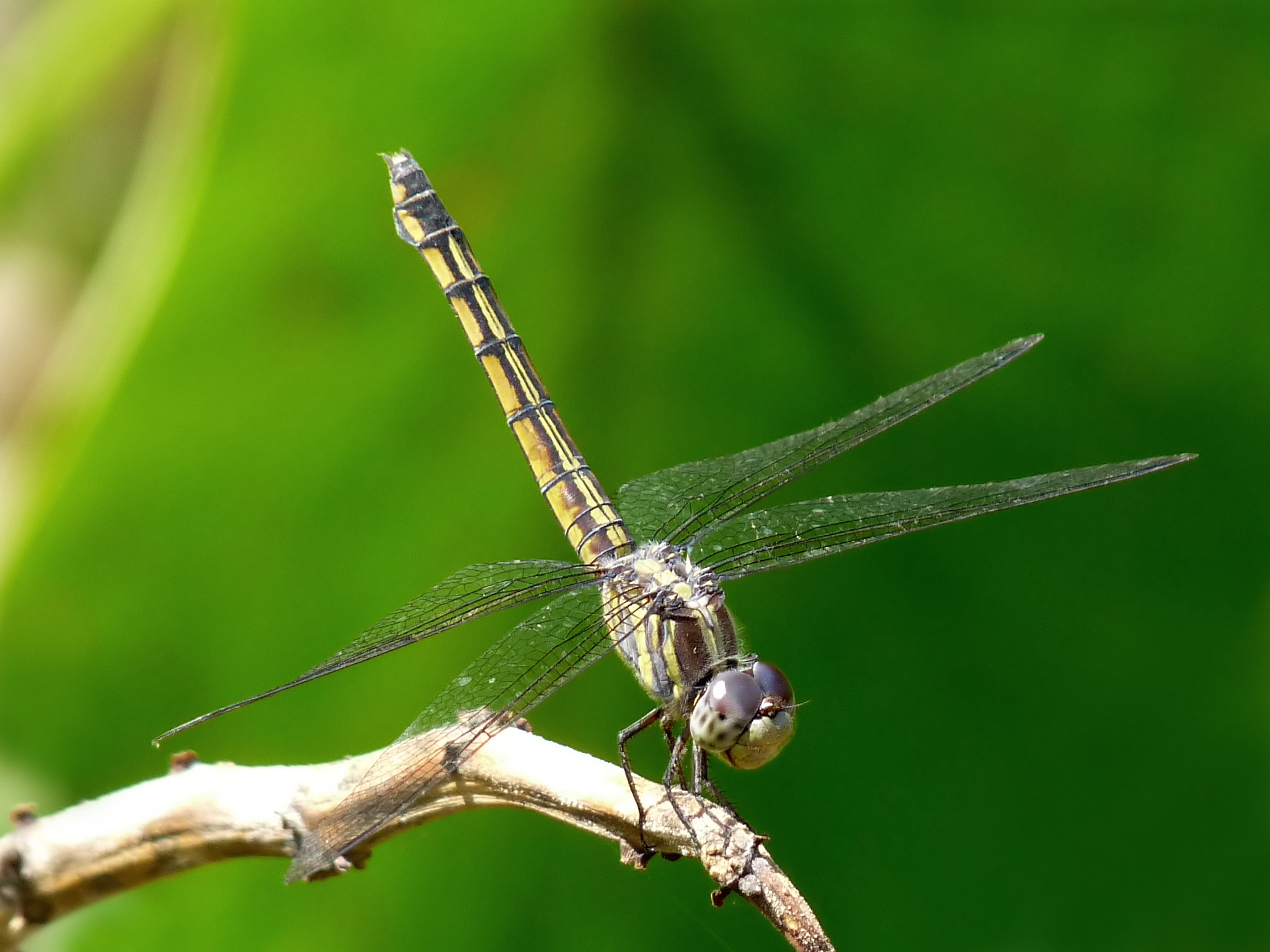
Female in obelisk posture

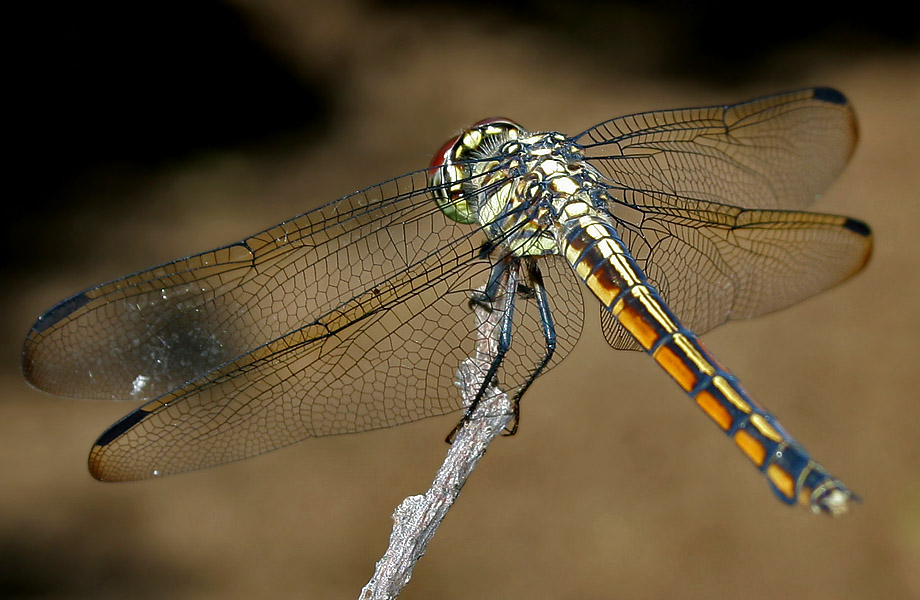
Female from behind

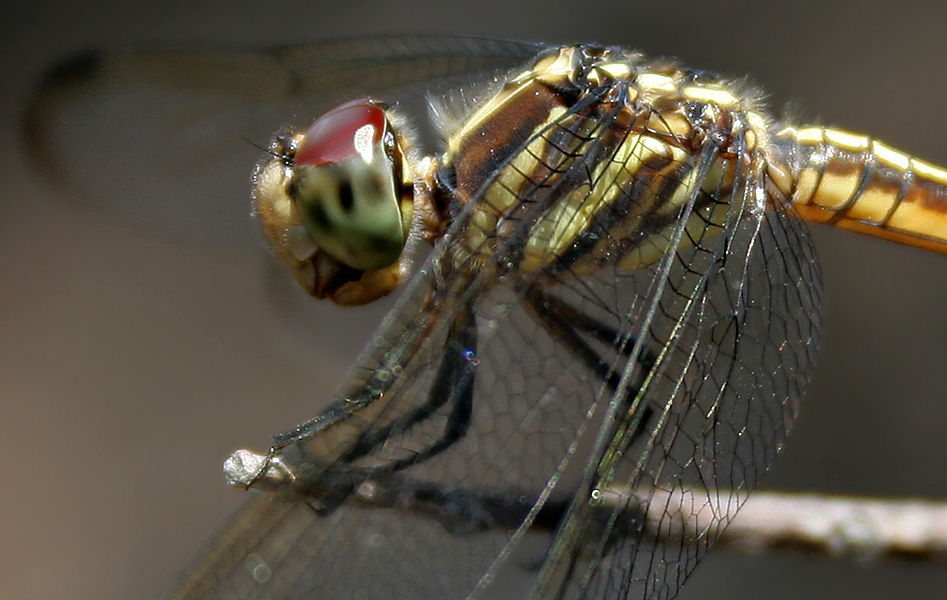
Female close-up

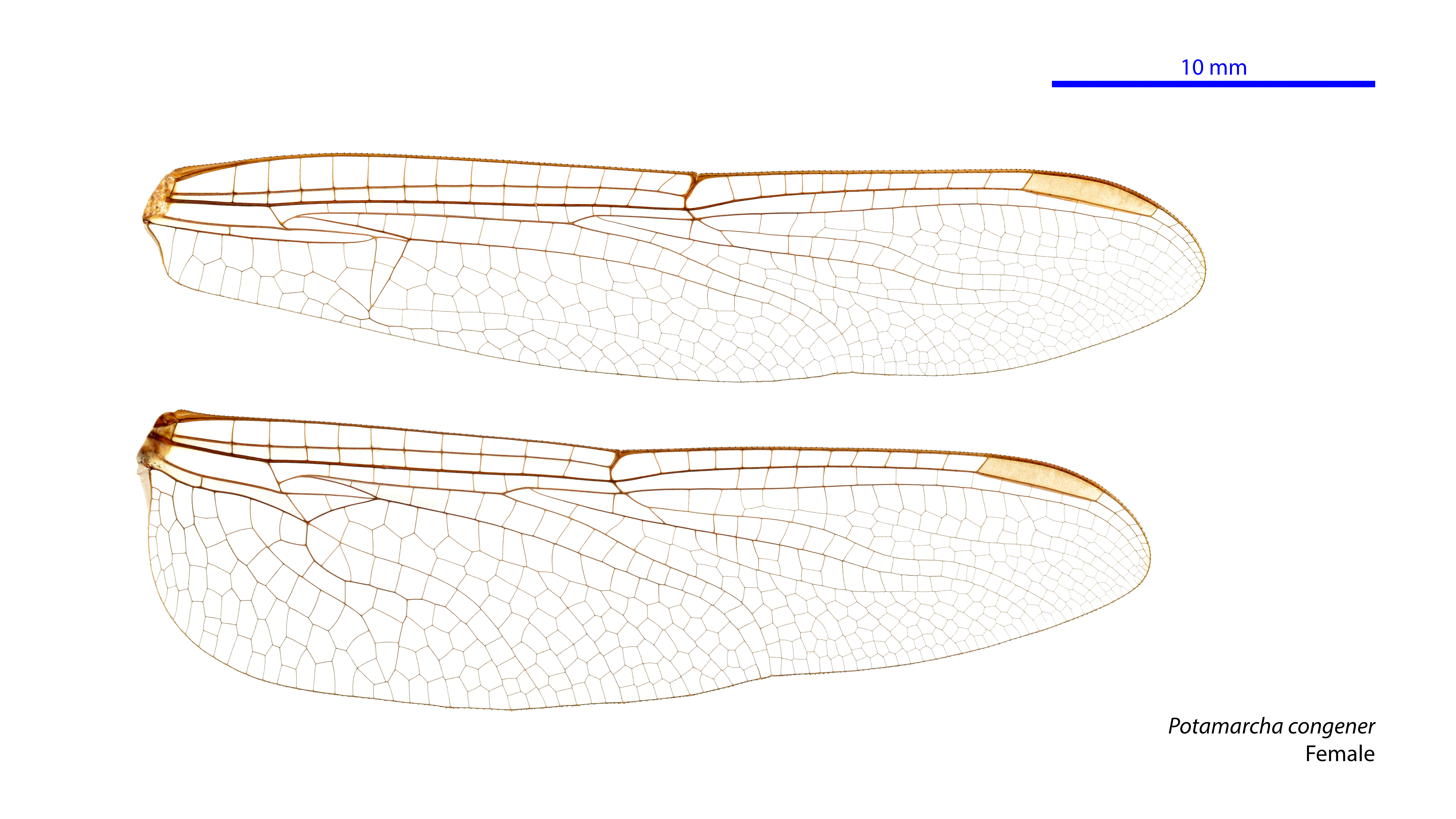
Female wings

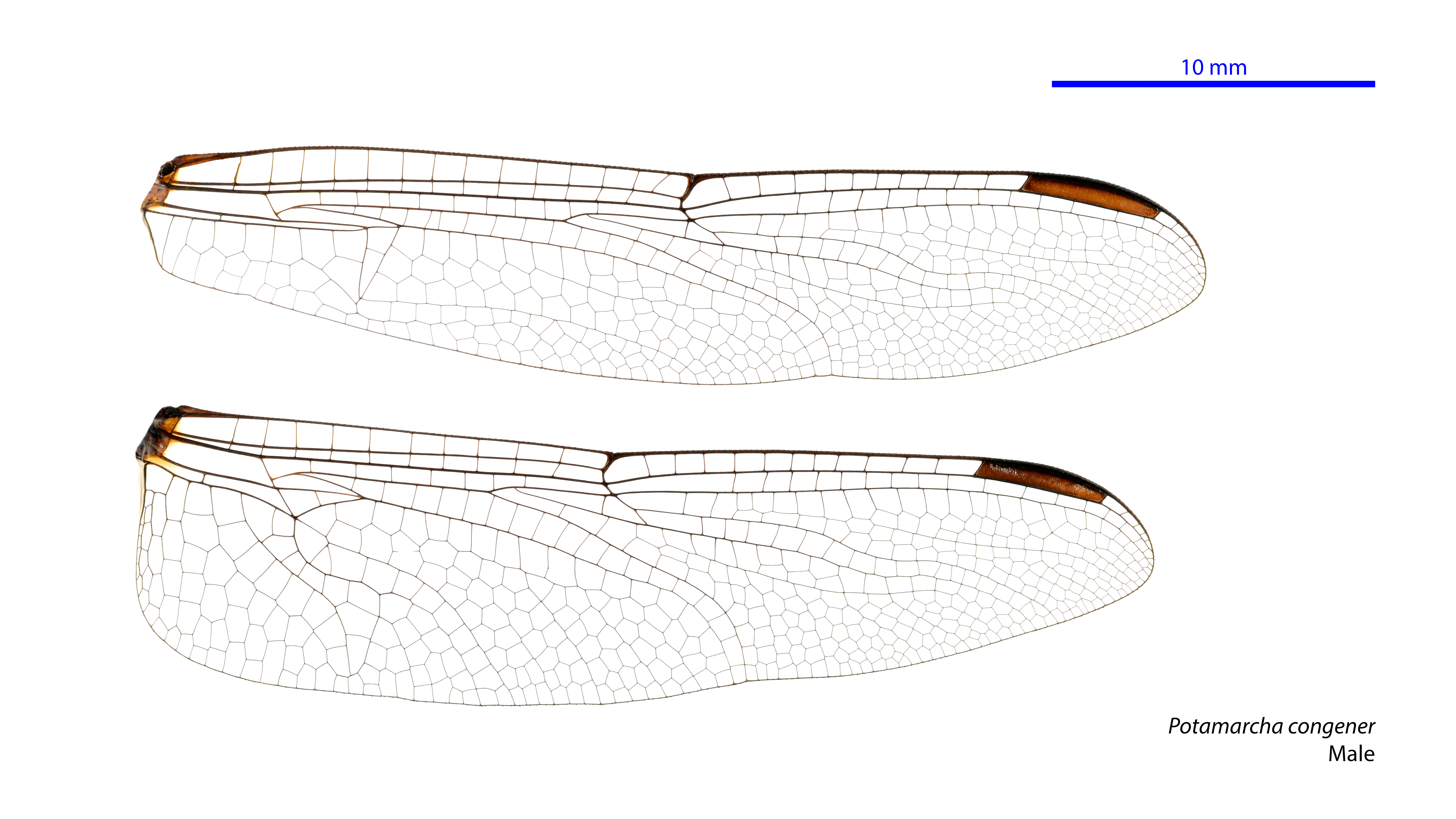
Male wings
Potamarcha congener roosting together on the same tree over several consecutive days during winter in Taiwan.

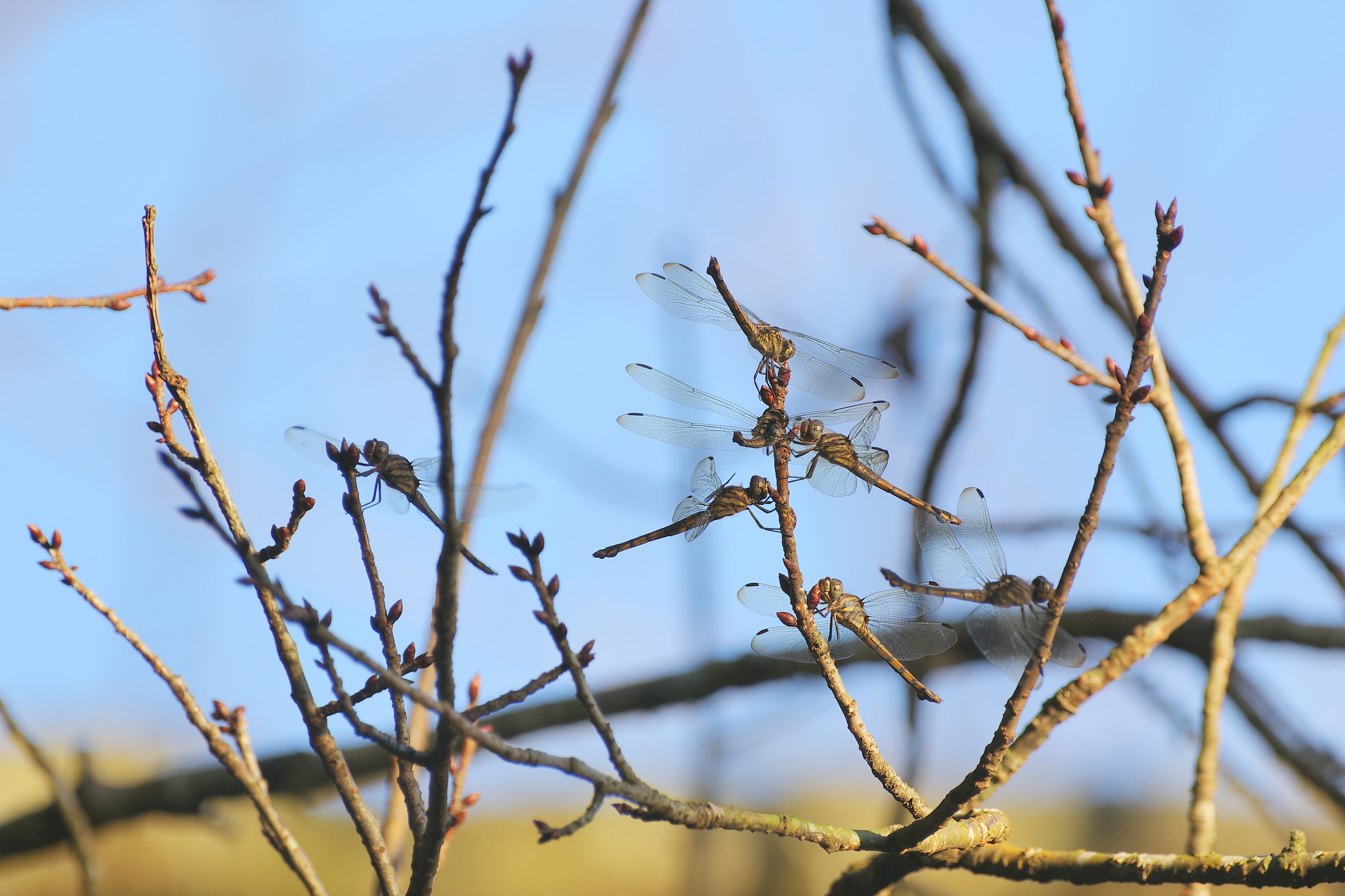
Potamarcha congener (4 January 2026)

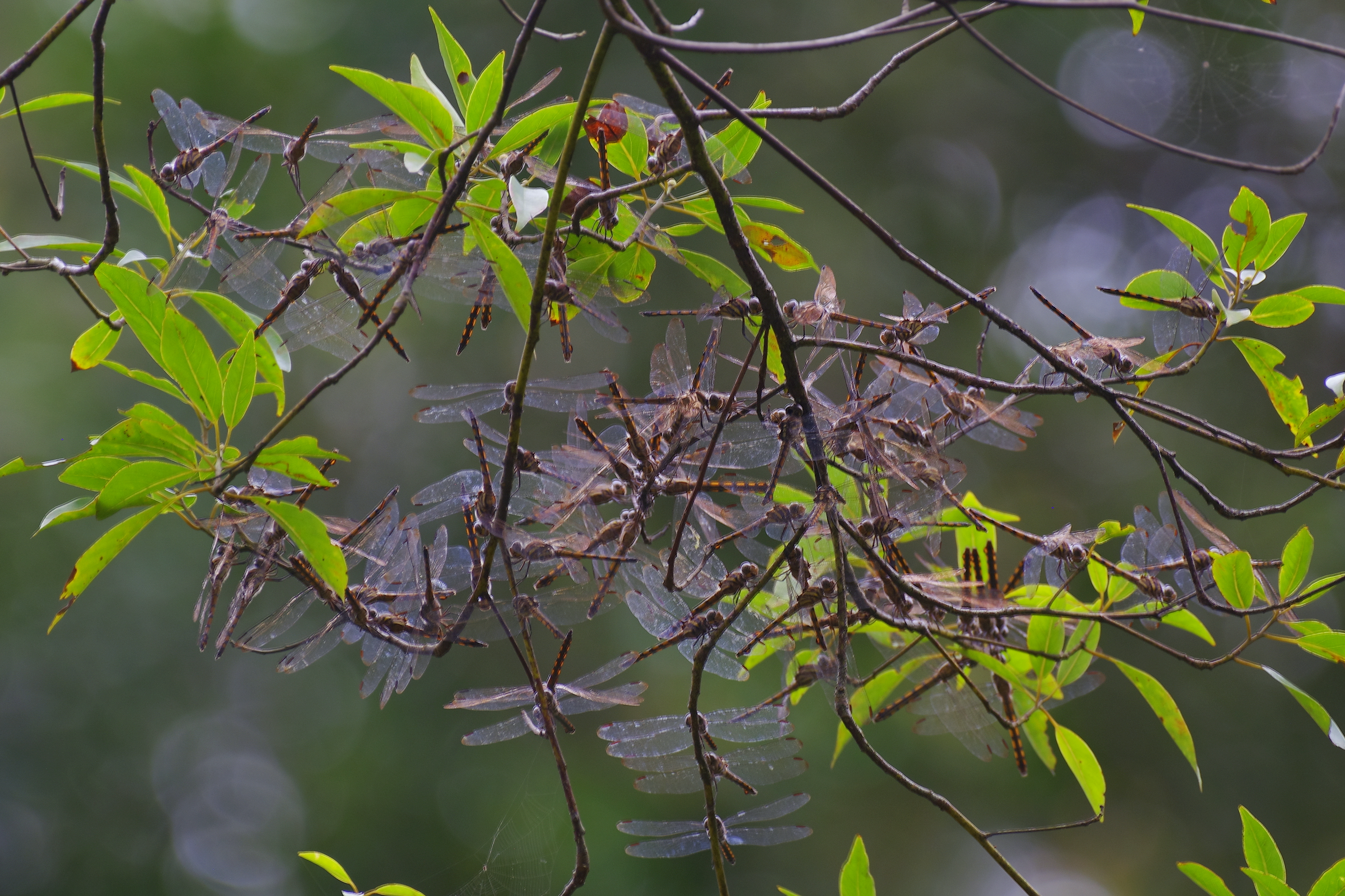
Potamarcha congener (11 January 2026)

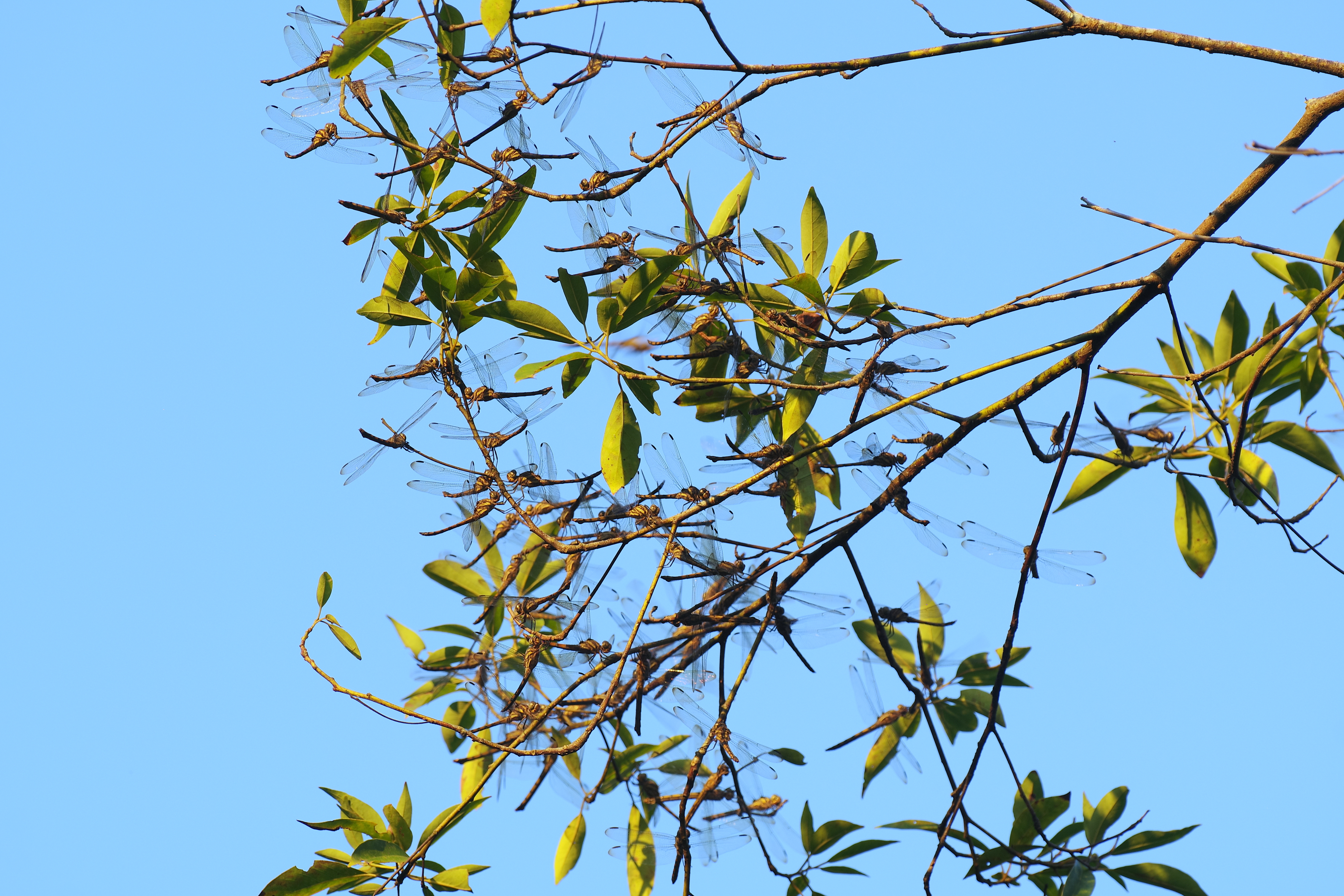
Potamarcha congener (15 January 2026)
