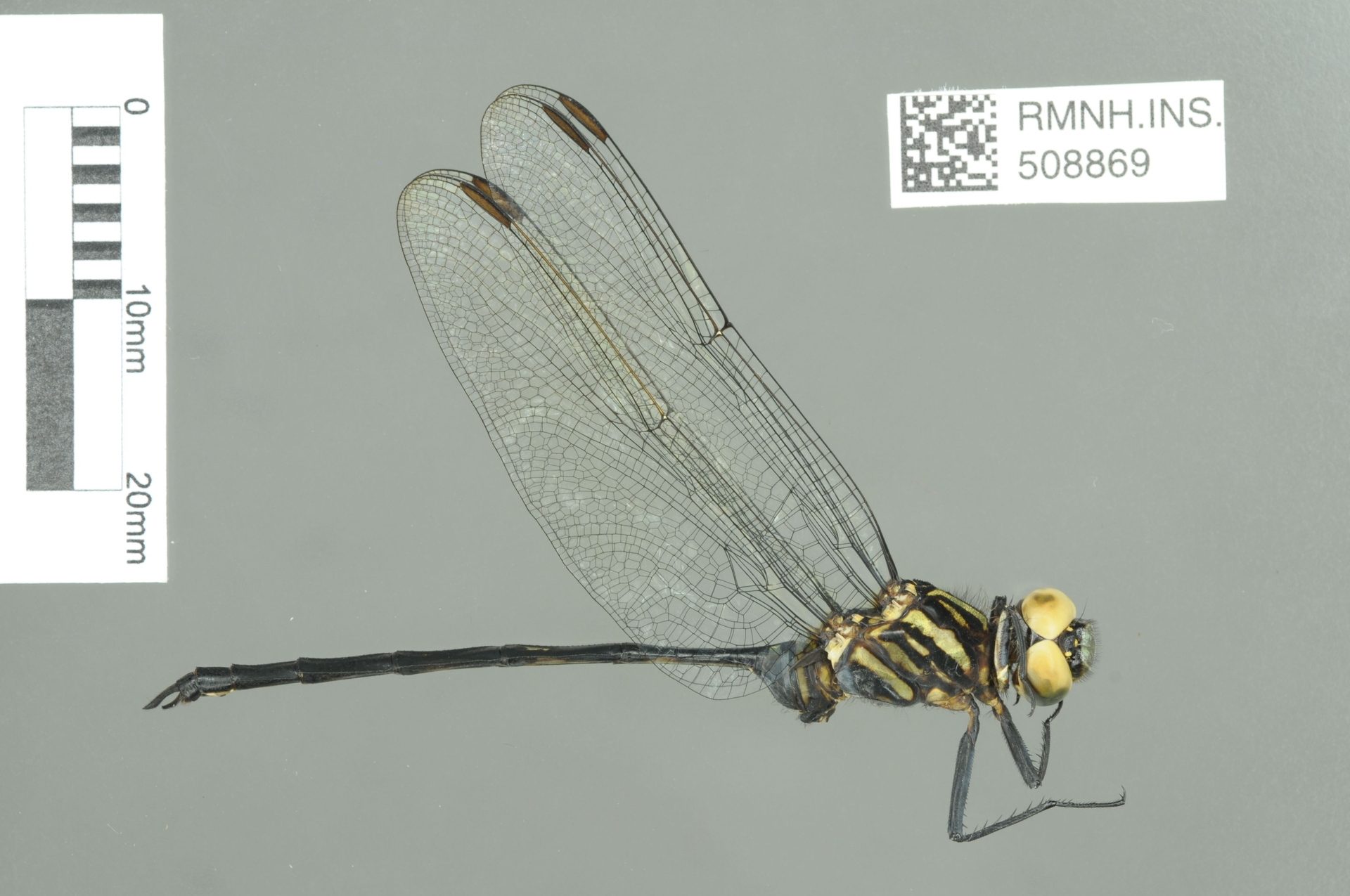

Conservation status
- Least Concern (IUCN 3.1)

Scientific classification
- Kingdom: Animalia
- Phylum: Arthropoda
- Clade: Pancrustacea
- Class: Insecta
- Order: Odonata
- Infraorder: Anisoptera
- Family: Libellulidae
- Genus: Orthetrum
- Species: O. africanum

Binomial name
- Orthetrum africanum (Selys, 1887)

= Orthetrum africanum =

Species of dragonfly

Orthetrum africanum is a freshwater dragonfly species, which occurs commonly through central and western Africa. Though deforestation is a threat to the species, there are no predictions of its population declining - mainly because of its widespread range. It breeds in forest streams and rivers.

== See also ==
- Orthetrum
