= Orthetrum borneense =

Conservation status
- Data Deficient (IUCN 3.1)

Scientific classification
- Kingdom: Animalia
- Phylum: Arthropoda
- Clade: Pancrustacea
- Class: Insecta
- Order: Odonata
- Infraorder: Anisoptera
- Family: Libellulidae
- Genus: Orthetrum
- Species: O. borneense

Binomial name
- Orthetrum borneense (Kimmins, 1936)

Species of dragonfly

Orthetrum borneense is a freshwater dragonfly species, native to Sarawak region in Malaysia. It is only known from 10 type species collected on Mount Dulit. Due to massive deforestation, the only information about its habitat is a supposition that it breeds in forest pools.

== See also ==
- Orthetrum
