= Orthetrum austeni =

Conservation status
- Least Concern (IUCN 3.1)

Scientific classification
- Kingdom: Animalia
- Phylum: Arthropoda
- Clade: Pancrustacea
- Class: Insecta
- Order: Odonata
- Infraorder: Anisoptera
- Family: Libellulidae
- Genus: Orthetrum
- Species: O. austeni

Binomial name
- Orthetrum austeni (Kirby, 1900)

Species of dragonfly

Orthetrum austeni, the giant skimmer, is a species of dragonfly in the family Libellulidae. It is found in Angola, Benin, Cameroon, Central African Republic, the Democratic Republic of the Congo, Ivory Coast, Equatorial Guinea, Gabon, Ghana, Guinea, Liberia, Nigeria, Sierra Leone, Tanzania, Togo, Uganda, and Zambia. Its natural habitats are subtropical or tropical moist lowland forests and rivers.
