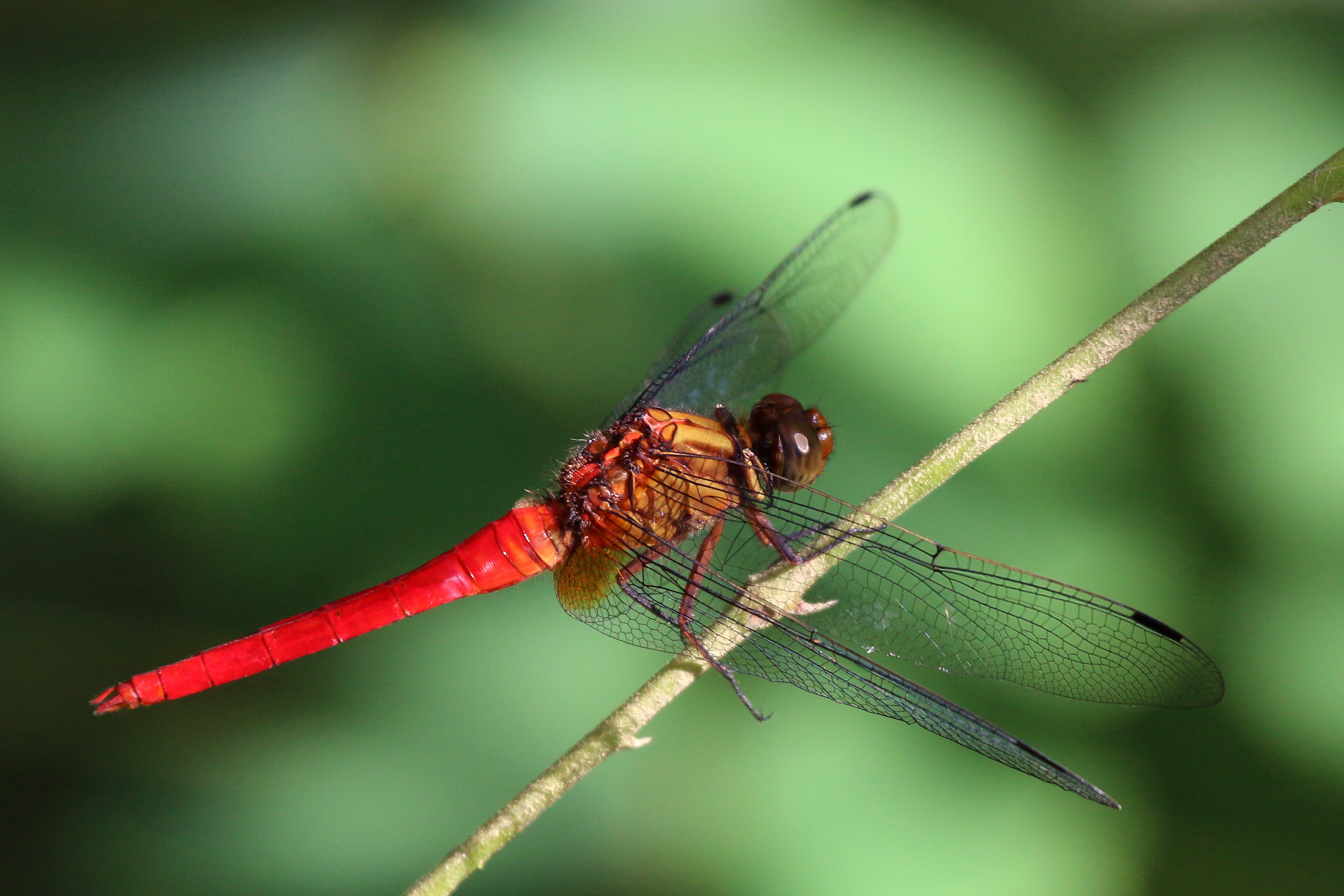
- male O. t. testaceum Sabah, Borneo

Conservation status
- Least Concern (IUCN 3.1)

Scientific classification
- Kingdom: Animalia
- Phylum: Arthropoda
- Clade: Pancrustacea
- Class: Insecta
- Order: Odonata
- Infraorder: Anisoptera
- Family: Libellulidae
- Genus: Orthetrum
- Species: O. testaceum

Binomial name
- Orthetrum testaceum (Burmeister, 1839)

= Orthetrum testaceum =

Species of dragonfly

Orthetrum testaceum, common names Crimson Dropwing or Orange Skimmer is an Asian freshwater dragonfly species belonging to the family Libellulidae.

== Subspecies ==
Subspecies include:

- Orthetrum testaceum soembanum Förster, 1903
- Orthetrum testaceum testaceum (Burmeister, 1839)

== Distribution and habitat ==
This common species is widespread throughout India, Indonesia, Malaysia, Philippines, Singapore and Thailand. These dragonflies may occur in various areas with standing waters, as in ponds, drains, marshes, around rivers, streams, lakes, and gardens.

== Description ==
A male and a mating couple. Video clip

Orthetrum testaceum can reach a body length of about 43–48 mm (1.7–1.9 in), with a hindwing of 34–38 mm (1.3–1.5 in) (in males). In these large dragonflies the thorax of adult males is orange-brown, with a vermilion red abdomen. The eyes are light brownish. The wings are smoky transparent, with an amber patch at the base. In adult females and in recently emerged males the body is olive-green to brown in colour with black markings and a clear base of the hindwings.

These dragonflies are rather similar to Orthetrum chrysis, but O. testaceum is more reddish, while O. chrysis has a reddish brown thorax.

== Biology and behavior ==
The males regularly perch near ponds, while the females usually fly to water only during mating season and egg-laying. In this case the males guard them by flying over them.

== See also ==
- Orthetrum
