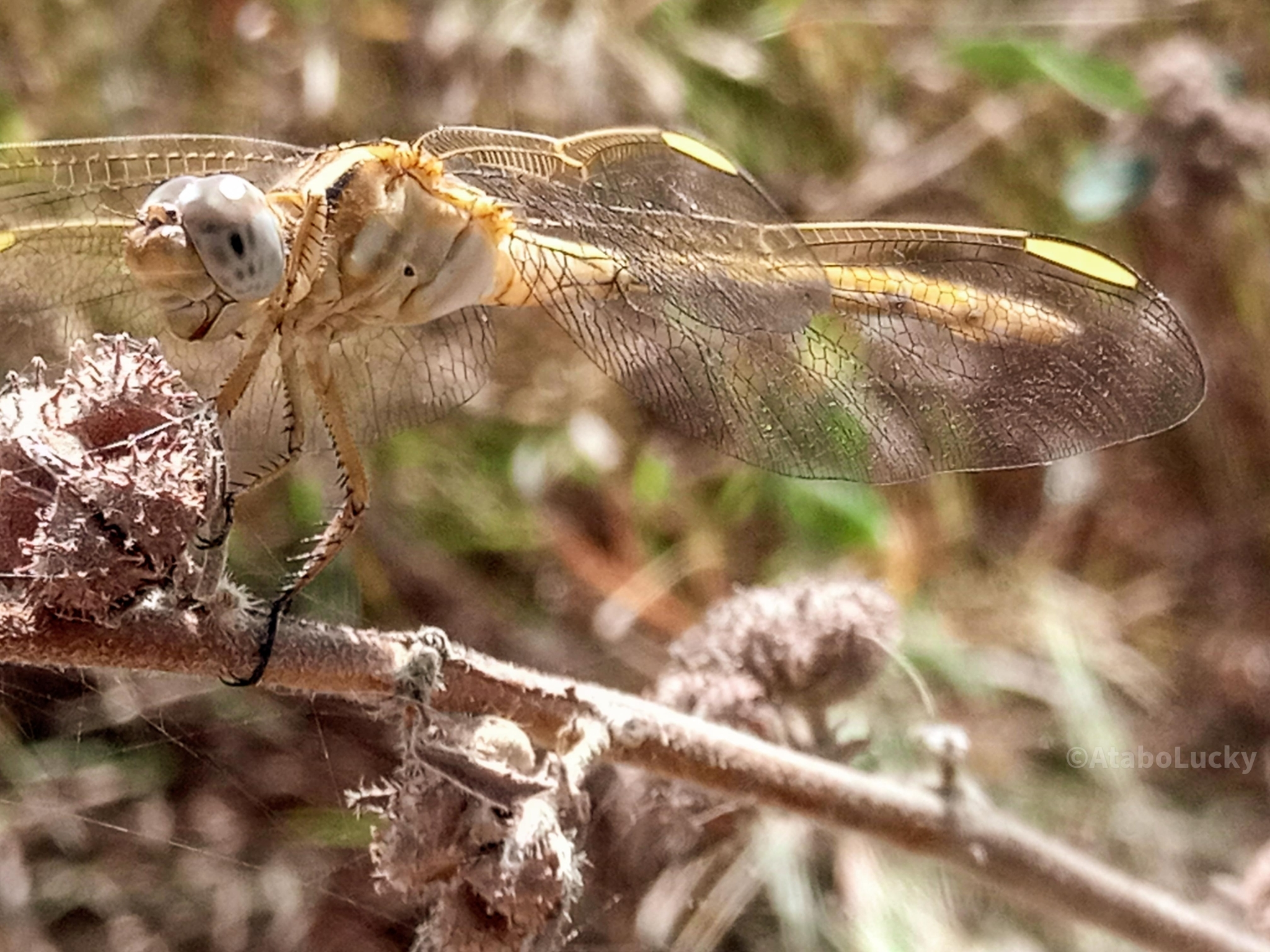

Conservation status
- Least Concern (IUCN 3.1)

Scientific classification
- Kingdom: Animalia
- Phylum: Arthropoda
- Clade: Pancrustacea
- Class: Insecta
- Order: Odonata
- Infraorder: Anisoptera
- Family: Libellulidae
- Genus: Orthetrum
- Species: O. angustiventre

Binomial name
- Orthetrum angustiventre (Rambur, 1842)

= Orthetrum angustiventre =

Species of dragonfly

Orthetrum angustiventre is a species of dragonfly in the family Libellulidae. It is found in Angola, Benin, Burkina Faso, Cameroon, Ivory Coast, Gambia, Ghana, Guinea, Guinea-Bissau, Kenya, Liberia, Mali, Nigeria, Senegal, Sierra Leone, Sudan, Togo, Uganda, Zambia, and possibly Tanzania. Its natural habitat is subtropical or tropical moist lowland forests.
