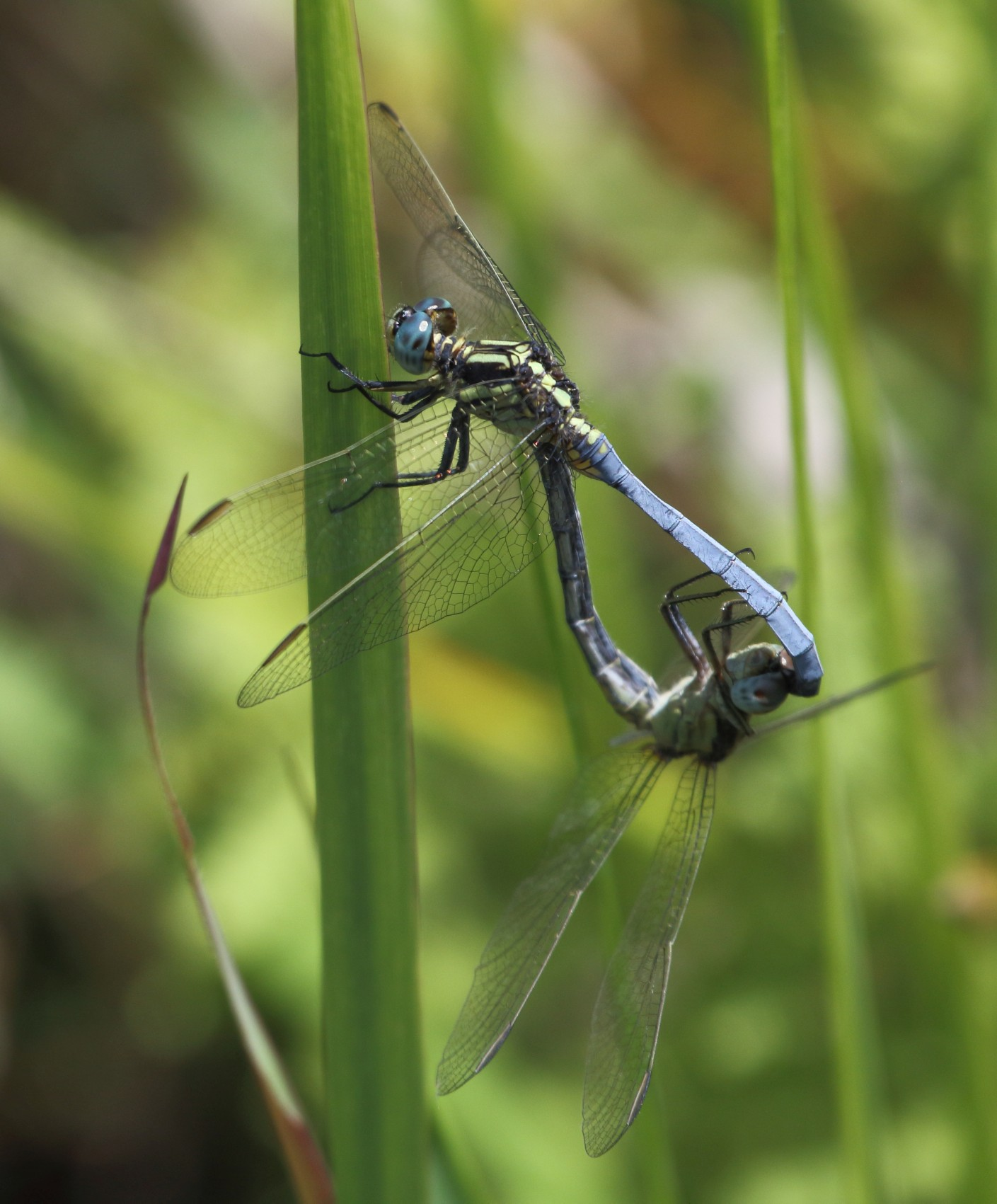
- Mating pair

Conservation status
- Least Concern (IUCN 3.1)

Scientific classification
- Kingdom: Animalia
- Phylum: Arthropoda
- Clade: Pancrustacea
- Class: Insecta
- Order: Odonata
- Infraorder: Anisoptera
- Family: Libellulidae
- Genus: Orthetrum
- Species: O. hintzi

Binomial name
- Orthetrum hintzi Schmidt, 1951

= Orthetrum hintzi =

Species of dragonfly

Orthetrum hintzi, the dark-shouldered skimmer is a species of dragonfly in the family Libellulidae. It is found in Angola, Benin, Botswana, Central African Republic, the Republic of the Congo, the Democratic Republic of the Congo, Ivory Coast, Equatorial Guinea, Ethiopia, Ghana, Guinea, Guinea-Bissau, Kenya, Liberia, Malawi, Mali, Mozambique, Namibia, Nigeria, Senegal, Sierra Leone, South Africa, Tanzania, Uganda, Zambia, Zimbabwe, and possibly Burundi. Its natural habitats are subtropical or tropical moist lowland forests, subtropical or tropical dry shrubland, subtropical or tropical moist shrubland, rivers, swamps, freshwater marshes, intermittent freshwater marshes, and freshwater springs.
