= Orthetrum robustum =

Conservation status
- Least Concern (IUCN 3.1)

Scientific classification
- Kingdom: Animalia
- Phylum: Arthropoda
- Clade: Pancrustacea
- Class: Insecta
- Order: Odonata
- Infraorder: Anisoptera
- Family: Libellulidae
- Genus: Orthetrum
- Species: O. robustum

Binomial name
- Orthetrum robustum (Balinsky, 1965)

Species of dragonfly

Orthetrum robustum is a freshwater dragonfly species, which occurs in Botswana, Namibia, South Africa and Zambia. The common name for this species is robust skimmer. It breeds in reedy swamps and woodland close to such swamps.

== See also ==
- Orthetrum
