= Orthetrum saegeri =

Conservation status
- Least Concern (IUCN 3.1)

Scientific classification
- Kingdom: Animalia
- Phylum: Arthropoda
- Clade: Pancrustacea
- Class: Insecta
- Order: Odonata
- Infraorder: Anisoptera
- Family: Libellulidae
- Genus: Orthetrum
- Species: O. saegeri

Binomial name
- Orthetrum saegeri Pinhey, 1966

Species of dragonfly

Orthetrum saegeri is a species of dragonfly in the family Libellulidae. It is found in Cameroon, Central African Republic, the Republic of the Congo, the Democratic Republic of the Congo, Gambia, Togo, Uganda, and Zambia. Its natural habitats are subtropical or tropical moist lowland forests and subtropical or tropical swamps.
