= Orthetrum macrostigma =

Conservation status
- Least Concern (IUCN 3.1)

Scientific classification
- Kingdom: Animalia
- Phylum: Arthropoda
- Clade: Pancrustacea
- Class: Insecta
- Order: Odonata
- Infraorder: Anisoptera
- Family: Libellulidae
- Genus: Orthetrum
- Species: O. macrostigma

Binomial name
- Orthetrum macrostigma Longfield, 1947

Species of dragonfly

Orthetrum macrostigma is a species of dragonfly in the family Libellulidae. It is found in the Democratic Republic of the Congo, Mozambique, and possibly Zambia. Its natural habitats are swamps, freshwater marshes, and intermittent freshwater marshes.
