= Orthetrum microstigma =

Conservation status
- Least Concern (IUCN 3.1)

Scientific classification
- Kingdom: Animalia
- Phylum: Arthropoda
- Clade: Pancrustacea
- Class: Insecta
- Order: Odonata
- Infraorder: Anisoptera
- Family: Libellulidae
- Genus: Orthetrum
- Species: O. microstigma

Binomial name
- Orthetrum microstigma Ris, 1911

Species of dragonfly

Orthetrum microstigma is a species of dragonfly in the family Libellulidae. It is found in Angola, Cameroon, Central African Republic, the Republic of the Congo, the Democratic Republic of the Congo, Ivory Coast, Equatorial Guinea, Gabon, Ghana, Guinea, Guinea-Bissau, Kenya, Liberia, Mali, Nigeria, Sierra Leone, Sudan, Tanzania, Uganda, and Zambia. Its natural habitat is subtropical or tropical swamps.
