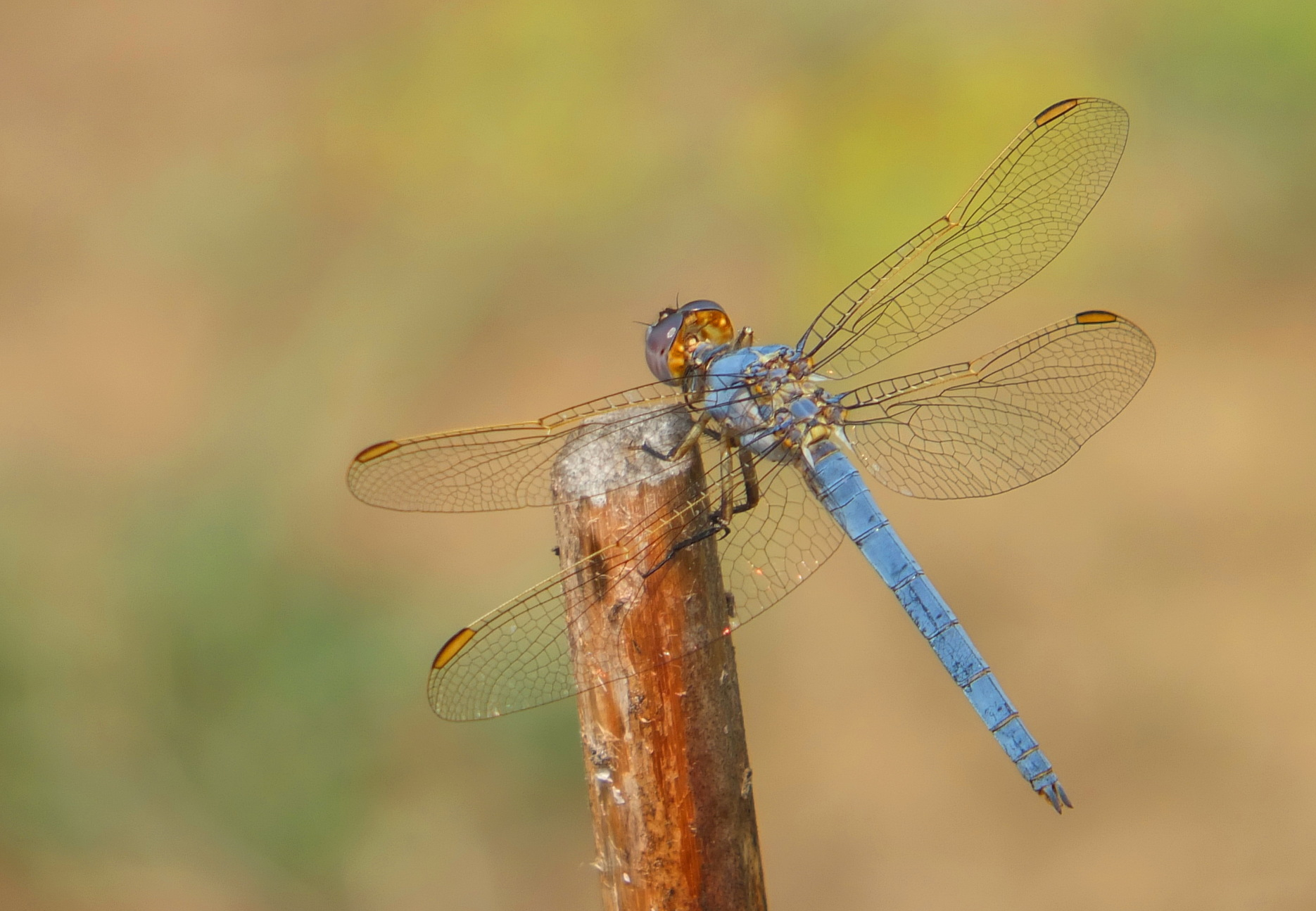
- Male

Scientific classification
- Kingdom: Animalia
- Phylum: Arthropoda
- Clade: Pancrustacea
- Class: Insecta
- Order: Odonata
- Infraorder: Anisoptera
- Superfamily: Libelluloidea
- Family: Libellulidae
- Genus: Orthetrum
- Species: O. nitidinerve

Binomial name
- Orthetrum nitidinerve (Selys, 1841)

= Orthetrum nitidinerve =

Species of dragonfly

Orthetrum nitidinerve, also known as Orthetrum baeticum, is a freshwater Mediterranean dragonfly species. The common name for this species is Yellow-Veined Skimmer. Its natural egg clutches count for an average of 970.

== Description ==
It has a wingspan of 8–9 cm. The wings have a yellow longitudinal vein that extends from the base of the wing to the nodus and from which numerous yellow transverse veins extend. The yellow-gold wing mark (pterostigma) is 4–5 mm long, but is significantly smaller in other Orthetrum species (approx. 3 mm). The body of the males is blue.

== Distribution ==
The Yellow-Veined Skimmer is very common in North Africa, but in Europe the species only occurs on the Iberian Peninsula, on Sardinia, near Naples and on Sicily. It inhabits waters up to an altitude of 2000 m.

== See also ==
- Orthetrum
