= Orthetrum latihami =

Conservation status
- Least Concern (IUCN 3.1)

Scientific classification
- Kingdom: Animalia
- Phylum: Arthropoda
- Clade: Pancrustacea
- Class: Insecta
- Order: Odonata
- Infraorder: Anisoptera
- Family: Libellulidae
- Genus: Orthetrum
- Species: O. latihami

Binomial name
- Orthetrum latihami Pinhey, 1966

Species of dragonfly

Orthetrum latihami, is an African freshwater dragonfly species. Due to its scarce distribution, the range of species can only be described as central African. It was first discovered in 1966.

== See also ==
- Orthetrum
