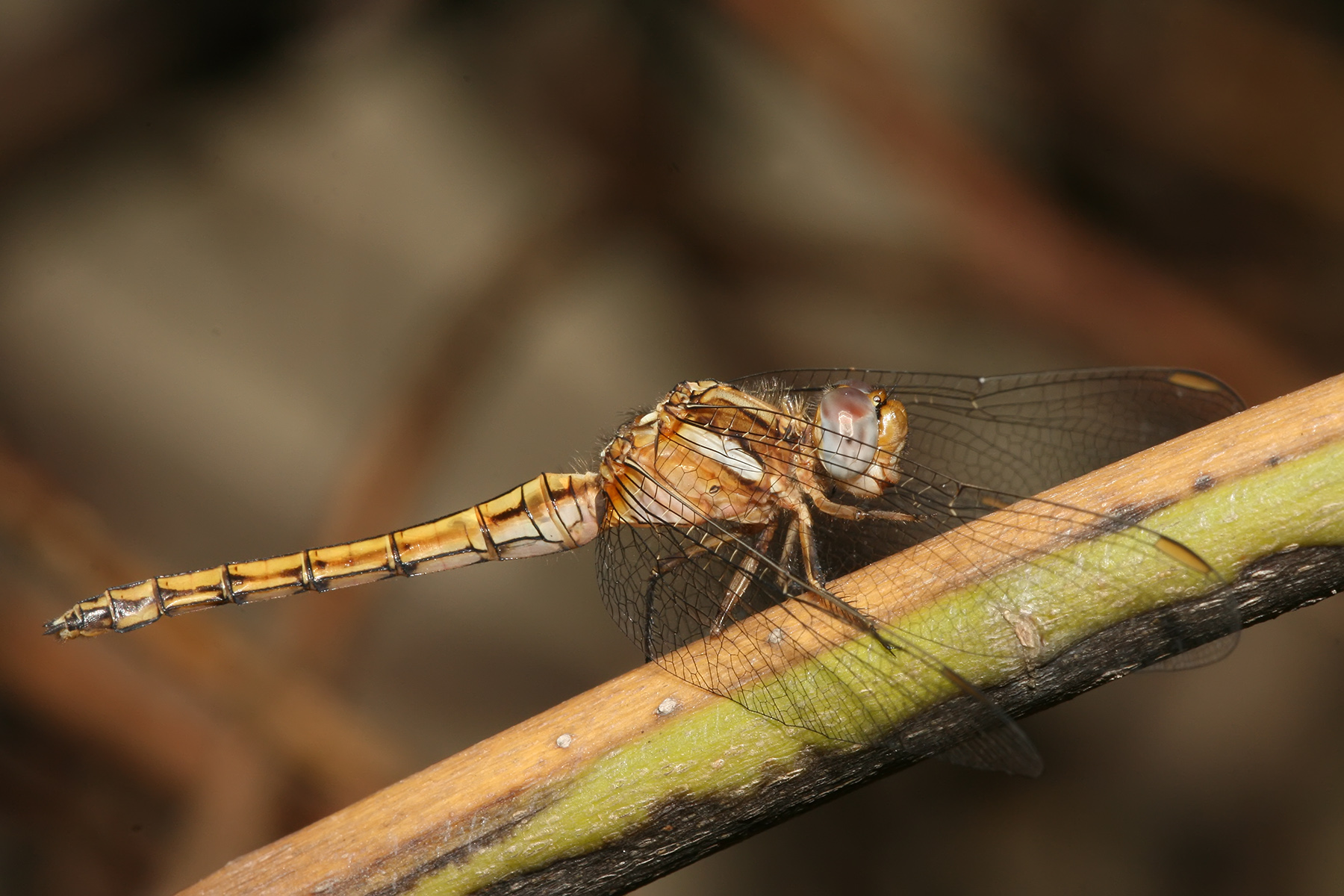
- Female Orthetrum chrysostigma
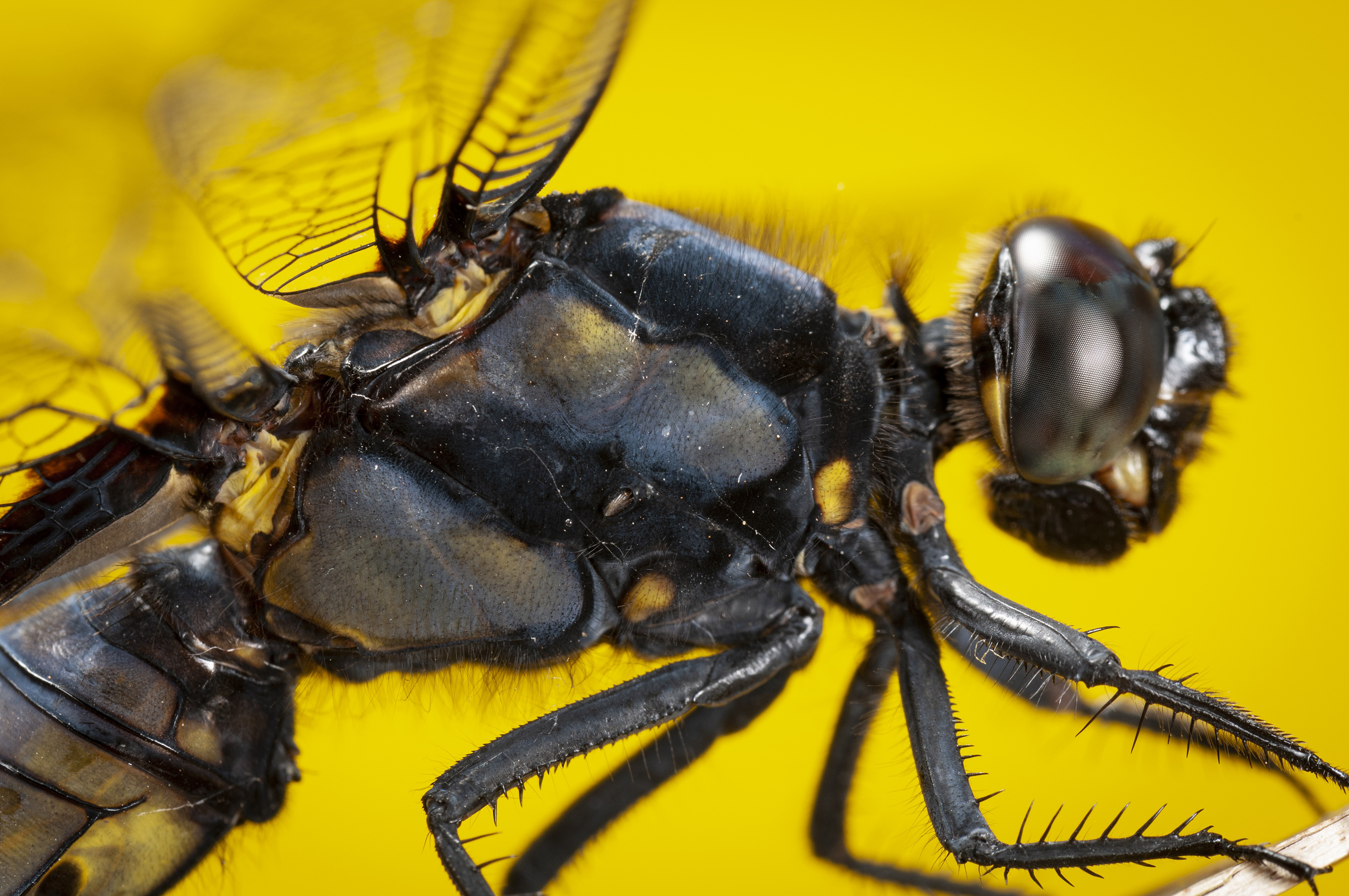
- Orthetrum melania, adult, Korea

Scientific classification
- Kingdom: Animalia
- Phylum: Arthropoda
- Clade: Pancrustacea
- Class: Insecta
- Order: Odonata
- Infraorder: Anisoptera
- Superfamily: Libelluloidea
- Family: Libellulidae
- Subfamily: Libellulinae
- Genus: Orthetrum; Newman, 1833

Synonyms
- Libella Brauer, 1868

= Orthetrum =

Genus of dragonflies

Orthetrum is a large genus of dragonflies in the Libellulidae family. They are commonly referred to as skimmers.

The size of adults within the genus ranges from small to large; in Africa, the hindwing ranges in length from 22 to 50 mm. The bodies of adult females and recently emerged males are yellow to brown with black markings; these may facilitate identification of individuals to species level. Mature males, however, develop blue-grey pruinosity over most of their bodies - this makes species identification difficult without the capture of a specimen and inspection of the shape of the hamule.

== Etymology ==
The genus name Orthetrum is derived from the Greek ὀρθός (orthos, "straight") and ἦτρον (ētron, "abdomen"), referring to the parallel-sided abdomen of the genus.

== Species ==
The genus Orthetrum includes the following species:

Scientific name (Note: A binomial authority in parentheses indicates that the species was originally described in a genus other than Orthetrum.)	Common name	IUCN Red List Status	Distribution	Picture (Male)	Picture (Female)
Orthetrum abbotti Calvert, 1892	Abbott's skimmer	LC^{IUCN}	Sub-Saharan Africa, Jordan and Yemen.		
Orthetrum africanum (Selys, 1887)		LC^{IUCN}	Central and Western Africa		
Orthetrum albistylum Selys, 1848	White-tailed skimmer	LC^{IUCN}	Europe to China and Japan		
Orthetrum angustiventre (Rambur, 1842)	Many-celled skimmer	LC^{IUCN}	Angola, Benin, Burkina Faso, Cameroon, Ivory Coast, Gambia, Ghana, Guinea, Guinea-Bissau, Kenya, Liberia, Mali, Nigeria, Senegal, Sierra Leone, Sudan, Togo, Uganda, Zambia, and possibly Tanzania.		
Orthetrum austeni (Kirby, 1900)	Giant skimmer	LC^{IUCN}	Angola, Benin, Cameroon, Central African Republic, the Democratic Republic of the Congo, Ivory Coast, Equatorial Guinea, Gabon, Ghana, Guinea, Liberia, Nigeria, Sierra Leone, Tanzania, Togo, Uganda, and Zambia.		
Orthetrum austrosundanum Lieftinck, 1953		VU			
Orthetrum azureum (Rambur, 1842)		LC	Madagascar		
Orthetrum balteatum Lieftinck, 1933	Speckled skimmer	NT^{IUCN}			
Orthetrum borneense Kimmins, 1936		DD^{IUCN}			
Orthetrum boumiera Watson & Arthington, 1978	Brownwater skimmer	NT^{IUCN}			
Orthetrum brachiale (Palisot de Beauvois, 1805)	Tough skimmer	LC^{IUCN}	Angola, Benin, Botswana, Burkina Faso, Cameroon, Central African Republic, Chad, Comoros, the Republic of the Congo, the Democratic Republic of the Congo, Ivory Coast, Egypt, Equatorial Guinea, Ethiopia, Gabon, Gambia, Ghana, Guinea, Kenya, Liberia, Madagascar, Malawi, Mali, Mauritania, Mauritius, Mozambique, Namibia, Niger, Nigeria, Réunion, Seychelles, Sierra Leone, Somalia, South Africa, Sudan, Tanzania, Togo, Uganda, Zambia, Zimbabwe, possibly Burundi, and possibly São Tomé and Príncipe		
Orthetrum brunneum (Fonscolombe, 1837)	Southern skimmer	LC^{IUCN}	Europe and the range extends to Mongolia and North Africa.		
Orthetrum caffrum (Burmeister, 1839)	Two-striped skimmer, white-lined skimmer	LC^{IUCN}	Angola, Cameroon, Chad, Ivory Coast, Ethiopia, Guinea, Kenya, Malawi, Mozambique, Namibia, Sierra Leone, South Africa, Sudan, Tanzania, Uganda, Zambia, Zimbabwe, possibly Burundi, and possibly Gambia		
Orthetrum caledonicum (Brauer, 1865)	Blue skimmer	LC			
Orthetrum cancellatum (Linnaeus, 1758)	Black-tailed skimmer	LC	Albania, Austria, Azerbaijan, Belarus, Belgium, Bosnia and Herzegovina, Bulgaria, China, Croatia, Cyprus, Czech Republic, Denmark, Estonia, Finland, France (Corsica, and mainland), Georgia, Germany, Greece, Hungary, India, Ireland, Italy, Kazakhstan, Kyrgyzstan, Latvia, Lithuania, Luxembourg, Malta, Moldova, Mongolia, Montenegro, Netherlands, North Macedonia, Norway, Poland, Portugal, Romania, Russia, Serbia, Slovakia, Slovenia, Spain, Sweden, Switzerland, Tajikistan, Turkey (Turkey-in-Europe), Turkmenistan, Ukraine, Uzbekistan and in part of United Kingdom		
Orthetrum capense Calvert, 1893		LC			
Orthetrum chrysis (Selys, 1891)		LC			
Orthetrum chrysostigma (Burmeister, 1839)	Epaulet skimmer	LC	Algeria, Angola, Benin, Botswana, Burkina Faso, Cameroon, Central African Republic, Chad, the Democratic Republic of the Congo, Ivory Coast, Egypt, Equatorial Guinea, Ethiopia, Gambia, Ghana, Guinea, Kenya, Liberia, Libya, Malawi, Mali, Mauritania, Morocco, Mozambique, Namibia, Niger, Nigeria, Senegal, Sierra Leone, Somalia, South Africa, Sudan, Tanzania, Togo, Uganda, Zambia, Zimbabwe		
Orthetrum coerulescens (Fabricius, 1798)	Keeled skimmer	LC	Afghanistan; Albania; Algeria; Armenia; Austria; Azerbaijan; Bosnia and Herzegovina; Bulgaria; Croatia; Cyprus; Czech Republic; Denmark; Finland; France; Georgia; Greece; Hungary; Iran, Islamic Republic of; Iraq; Ireland; Italy; Lebanon; Liechtenstein; Lithuania; Luxembourg; Macedonia, the former Yugoslav Republic of; Montenegro; Morocco; Netherlands; Norway; Poland; Portugal; Romania; Russian Federation; Serbia; Slovakia; Slovenia; Spain; Sweden; Switzerland; Syrian Arab Republic; Tunisia; Turkey; Ukraine; United Kingdom.		
Orthetrum glaucum (Brauer, 1865)	Blue marsh hawk	LC^{IUCN}	tropical and subtropical Asia		
Orthetrum guineense Ris, 1909	Guinea skimmer	LC^{IUCN}	Angola, Benin, Burkina Faso, Cameroon, Central African Republic, the Republic of the Congo, the Democratic Republic of the Congo, Ivory Coast, Equatorial Guinea, Ethiopia, Gabon, Ghana, Guinea, Kenya, Liberia, Malawi, Mozambique, Namibia, Nigeria, Senegal, Sierra Leone, Somalia, South Africa, Tanzania, Togo, Uganda, Zambia, Zimbabwe, and possibly Burundi		
Orthetrum guptai Baijal, 1955		LC			
Orthetrum helena Buchholz, 1954		LC			
Orthetrum hintzi Schmidt, 1951	Hintz's skimmer	LC^{IUCN}	Angola, Benin, Botswana, Central African Republic, the Republic of the Congo, the Democratic Republic of the Congo, Ivory Coast, Equatorial Guinea, Ethiopia, Ghana, Guinea, Guinea-Bissau, Kenya, Liberia, Malawi, Mali, Mozambique, Namibia, Nigeria, Senegal, Sierra Leone, South Africa, Tanzania, Uganda, Zambia, Zimbabwe, and possibly Burundi		
Orthetrum icteromelas Ris, 1910	Spectacled skimmer	LC^{IUCN}	Angola, Botswana, Cameroon, Chad, the Democratic Republic of the Congo, Ivory Coast, Gambia, Ghana, Guinea, Kenya, Madagascar, Malawi, Mauritius, Mozambique, Namibia, Nigeria, Sierra Leone, South Africa, Sudan, Tanzania, Togo, Uganda, Zambia, Zimbabwe, and possibly Burundi		
Orthetrum japonicum (Uhler, 1858)	Taiwan-shioya-tombo	LC			
Orthetrum julia Kirby, 1900	Julia skimmer	LC^{IUCN}	Angola, Benin, Burkina Faso, Cameroon, Central African Republic, the Republic of the Congo, the Democratic Republic of the Congo, Ivory Coast, Equatorial Guinea, Ethiopia, Gabon, Gambia, Ghana, Guinea, Kenya, Liberia, Malawi, Mozambique, Namibia, Nigeria, São Tomé and Príncipe, Senegal, Sierra Leone, South Africa, Sudan, Tanzania, Togo, Uganda, Zambia, Zimbabwe, possibly Burundi, and possibly Madagascar		
Orthetrum kollmannspergeri Buchholz, 1959		LC^{IUCN}			
Orthetrum kristenseni Ris, 1911		LC^{IUCN}	Ethiopia		
Orthetrum latihami Pinhey, 1966		LC^{IUCN}	Central Africa		
Orthetrum lemur Ris, 1909		LC^{IUCN}			
Orthetrum lineostigma (Selys, 1886)		LC^{IUCN}			
Orthetrum luzonicum (Brauer, 1868)		LC^{IUCN}			
Orthetrum machadoi Longfield, 1955	Machado's skimmer	LC^{IUCN}	Angola, Botswana, Cameroon, the Democratic Republic of the Congo, Ethiopia, Kenya, Malawi, Mozambique, Namibia, Sierra Leone, South Africa, Tanzania, Uganda, Zambia, Zimbabwe, and possibly Burundi		
Orthetrum macrostigma Longfield, 1947		LC	Democratic Republic of the Congo, Mozambique, and possibly Zambia		
Orthetrum malgassicum Pinhey, 1970		LC			
Orthetrum martensi Asahina, 1978		LC			
Orthetrum melania (Selys, 1883)		LC			
Orthetrum microstigma Ris, 1911		LC	Angola, Cameroon, Central African Republic, the Republic of the Congo, the Democratic Republic of the Congo, Ivory Coast, Equatorial Guinea, Gabon, Ghana, Guinea, Guinea-Bissau, Kenya, Liberia, Mali, Nigeria, Sierra Leone, Sudan, Tanzania, Uganda, and Zambia		
Orthetrum migratum Lieftinck, 1951	Rosy skimmer	LC^{IUCN}			
Orthetrum monardi Schmidt, 1951		LC	Angola, Benin, Burkina Faso, Cameroon, Central African Republic, the Republic of the Congo, Ivory Coast, Ethiopia, Gambia, Ghana, Guinea, Guinea-Bissau, Kenya, Nigeria, Sierra Leone, Tanzania, Uganda, and Zambia		
Orthetrum nitidinerve (Selys, 1841)	Yellow-veined skimmer	LC	North Africa, the Iberian Peninsula, Sardinia, Naples and Sicily		
Orthetrum poecilops Ris, 1916	Mangrove skimmer	VU			
Orthetrum pruinosum (Burmeister, 1839)	Crimson-tailed marsh hawk	LC			
Orthetrum ransonnetii (Brauer, 1865)	Desert skimmer	LC	Western Sahara, Sudan, Niger, Chad, Algeria, Iran, Israel, Jordan, Egypt, Oman, United Arab Emirates		
Orthetrum robustum Balinsky, 1965	Robust skimmer	LC			
Orthetrum rubens Barnard, 1937	Elusive skimmer	VU^{IUCN}	South Africa		
Orthetrum sabina (Drury, 1770)	Slender skimmer	LC			
Orthetrum saegeri Pinhey, 1966		LC	Cameroon, Central African Republic, the Republic of the Congo, the Democratic Republic of the Congo, Gambia, Togo, Uganda, and Zambia		
Orthetrum sagitta Ris, 1915	Arrow skimmer	LC	Sierra Leone		
Orthetrum serapia Watson, 1984	Green skimmer	LC			
Orthetrum signiferum Lieftinck, 1926		LC			
Orthetrum silvarum Lieftinck, 1934		LC			
Orthetrum stemmale (Burmeister, 1839)	Stemmale skimmer	LC^{IUCN}	Angola, Benin, Botswana, Cameroon, Central African Republic, the Republic of the Congo, the Democratic Republic of the Congo, Ivory Coast, Equatorial Guinea, Gambia, Ghana, Guinea, Kenya, Liberia, Malawi, Mali, Mozambique, Namibia, Nigeria, São Tomé and Príncipe, Sierra Leone, Sudan, Tanzania, Togo, Uganda, Zambia, Zimbabwe, and possibly Burundi		
Orthetrum taeniolatum (Schneider, 1845)	Small skimmer	LC			
Orthetrum testaceum (Burmeister, 1839)		LC	India, Indonesia, Malaysia, Philippines, Singapore and Thailand.		
Orthetrum translatum Bartenev, 1929		LC			
Orthetrum triangulare (Selys, 1878)	Blue-tailed forest hawk	LC			
Orthetrum trinacria (Selys, 1841)	Long skimmer	LC	Algeria, Angola, Botswana, Burkina Faso, Cameroon, Ivory Coast, Egypt, Ethiopia, France (Corsica), Gambia, Ghana, Italy (Sicily and Sardinia), Kenya, Libya, Madagascar, Malawi, Mali, Morocco, Mozambique, Namibia, Niger, Nigeria, Senegal, Somalia, South Africa, Tanzania, Togo, Uganda, Zambia, Zimbabwe, and possibly Burundi		
Orthetrum villosovittatum (Brauer, 1868)	Fiery skimmer	LC			
