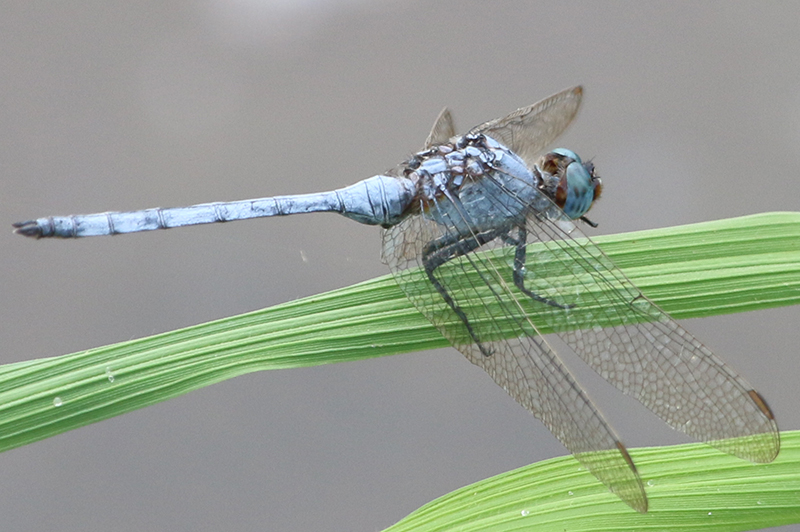

Conservation status
- Least Concern (IUCN 3.1)

Scientific classification
- Kingdom: Animalia
- Phylum: Arthropoda
- Clade: Pancrustacea
- Class: Insecta
- Order: Odonata
- Infraorder: Anisoptera
- Family: Libellulidae
- Genus: Orthetrum
- Species: O. brachiale

Binomial name
- Orthetrum brachiale (Palisot de Beauvois, 1817)

= Orthetrum brachiale =

Species of dragonfly

Orthetrum brachiale, the tough skimmer or strong skimmer, is a species of dragonfly in the family Libellulidae. It is found in Angola, Benin, Botswana, Burkina Faso, Cameroon, Central African Republic, Chad, Comoros, the Republic of the Congo, the Democratic Republic of the Congo, Ivory Coast, Egypt, Equatorial Guinea, Ethiopia, Gabon, Gambia, Ghana, Guinea, Kenya, Liberia, Madagascar, Malawi, Mali, Mauritania, Mauritius, Mozambique, Namibia, Niger, Nigeria, Réunion, Seychelles, Sierra Leone, Somalia, South Africa, Sudan, Tanzania, Togo, Uganda, Zambia, Zimbabwe, possibly Burundi, and possibly São Tomé and Príncipe. Its natural habitats are subtropical or tropical moist lowland forests, dry savanna, moist savanna, subtropical or tropical dry shrubland, subtropical or tropical moist shrubland, shrub-dominated wetlands, swamps, intermittent freshwater lakes, freshwater marshes, and intermittent freshwater marshes.
