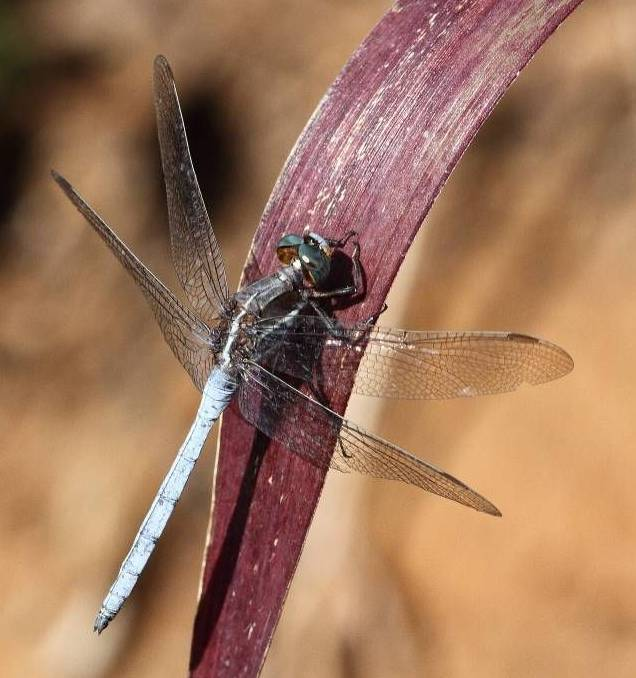
- Male

Conservation status
- Least Concern (IUCN 3.1)

Scientific classification
- Kingdom: Animalia
- Phylum: Arthropoda
- Clade: Pancrustacea
- Class: Insecta
- Order: Odonata
- Infraorder: Anisoptera
- Family: Libellulidae
- Genus: Orthetrum
- Species: O. caffrum

Binomial name
- Orthetrum caffrum (Burmeister, 1839)

= Orthetrum caffrum =

Species of dragonfly

Orthetrum caffrum, the two-striped skimmer or white-lined skimmer, is a species of dragonfly in the family Libellulidae. It is found in Angola, Cameroon, Chad, Ivory Coast, Ethiopia, Guinea, Kenya, Malawi, Mozambique, Namibia, Sierra Leone, South Africa, Sudan, Tanzania, Uganda, Zambia, Zimbabwe, possibly Burundi, and possibly Gambia. Its natural habitats are subtropical or tropical moist lowland forests, subtropical or tropical moist montane forests, subtropical or tropical high-altitude shrubland, rivers, shrub-dominated wetlands, freshwater springs, and Alpine wetlands.
