= Orthetrum kollmannspergeri =

Conservation status
- Least Concern (IUCN 3.1)

Scientific classification
- Kingdom: Animalia
- Phylum: Arthropoda
- Clade: Pancrustacea
- Class: Insecta
- Order: Odonata
- Infraorder: Anisoptera
- Family: Libellulidae
- Genus: Orthetrum
- Species: O. kollmannspergeri

Binomial name
- Orthetrum kollmannspergeri (Buchholz, 1959)

Species of dragonfly

Orthetrum kollmannspergeri is a freshwater dragonfly in the Libellulidae family. The kollmannspergeri species is present in Africa and western Arabia. Due to many similarities, it is often confused with its Asian counterpart, Orthetrum taeniolatum.

== See also ==
- Orthetrum
