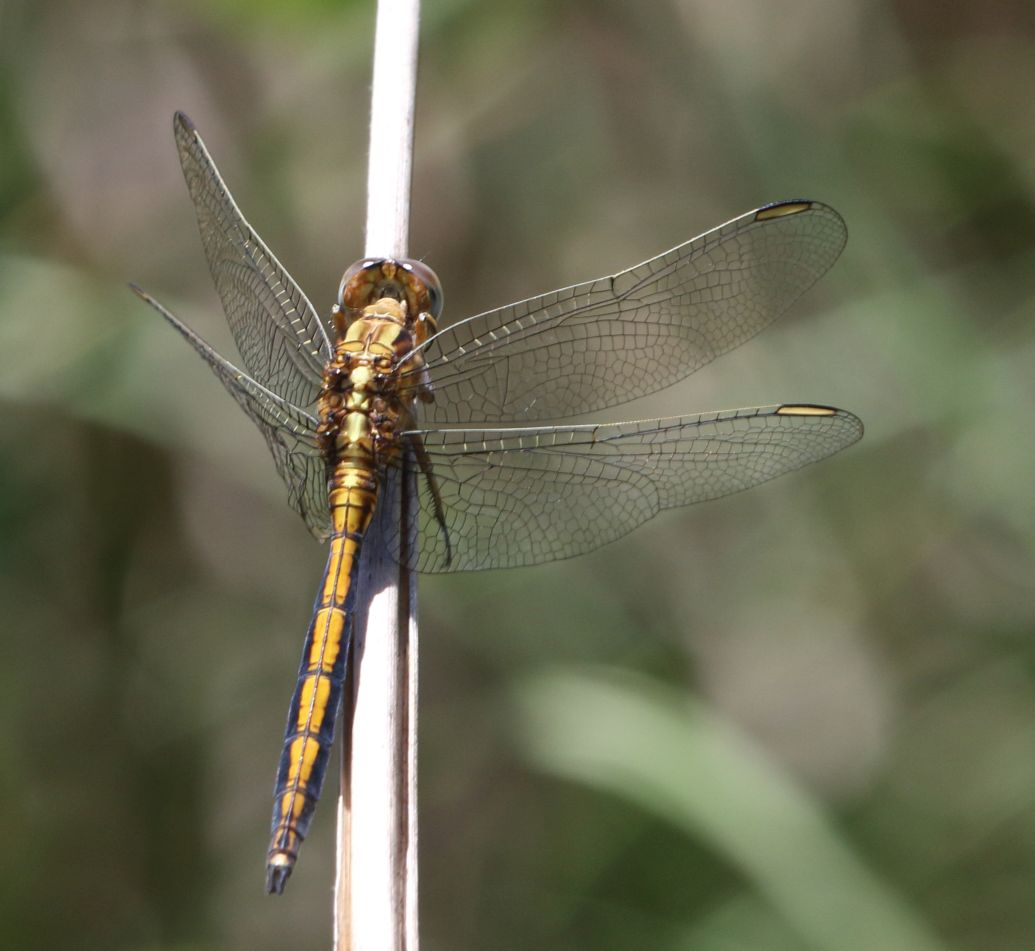
- Immature male
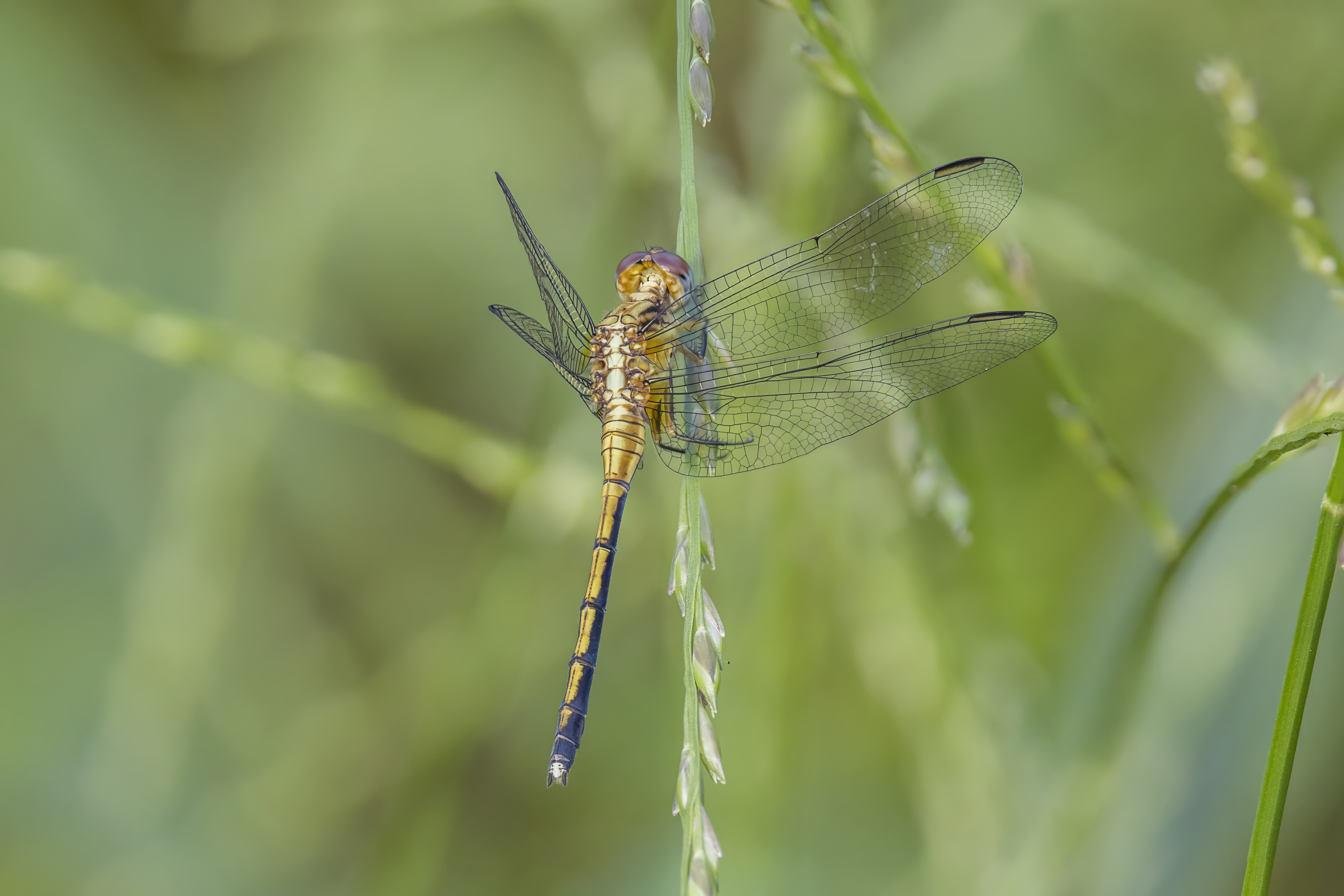
- Female

Conservation status
- Least Concern (IUCN 3.1)

Scientific classification
- Kingdom: Animalia
- Phylum: Arthropoda
- Clade: Pancrustacea
- Class: Insecta
- Order: Odonata
- Infraorder: Anisoptera
- Family: Libellulidae
- Genus: Orthetrum
- Species: O. machadoi

Binomial name
- Orthetrum machadoi Longfield, 1955

= Orthetrum machadoi =

Species of dragonfly

Orthetrum machadoi, common name highland skimmer or Machado's skimmer, is a species of dragonfly in the family Libellulidae. It is found in Angola, Botswana, Cameroon, the Democratic Republic of the Congo, Ethiopia, Kenya, Malawi, Mozambique, Namibia, Sierra Leone, South Africa, Tanzania, Uganda, Zambia, Zimbabwe, and possibly Burundi. Its natural habitats are subtropical or tropical moist lowland forests, subtropical or tropical dry shrubland, subtropical or tropical moist shrubland, rivers, shrub-dominated wetlands, swamps, freshwater marshes, and intermittent freshwater marshes.
