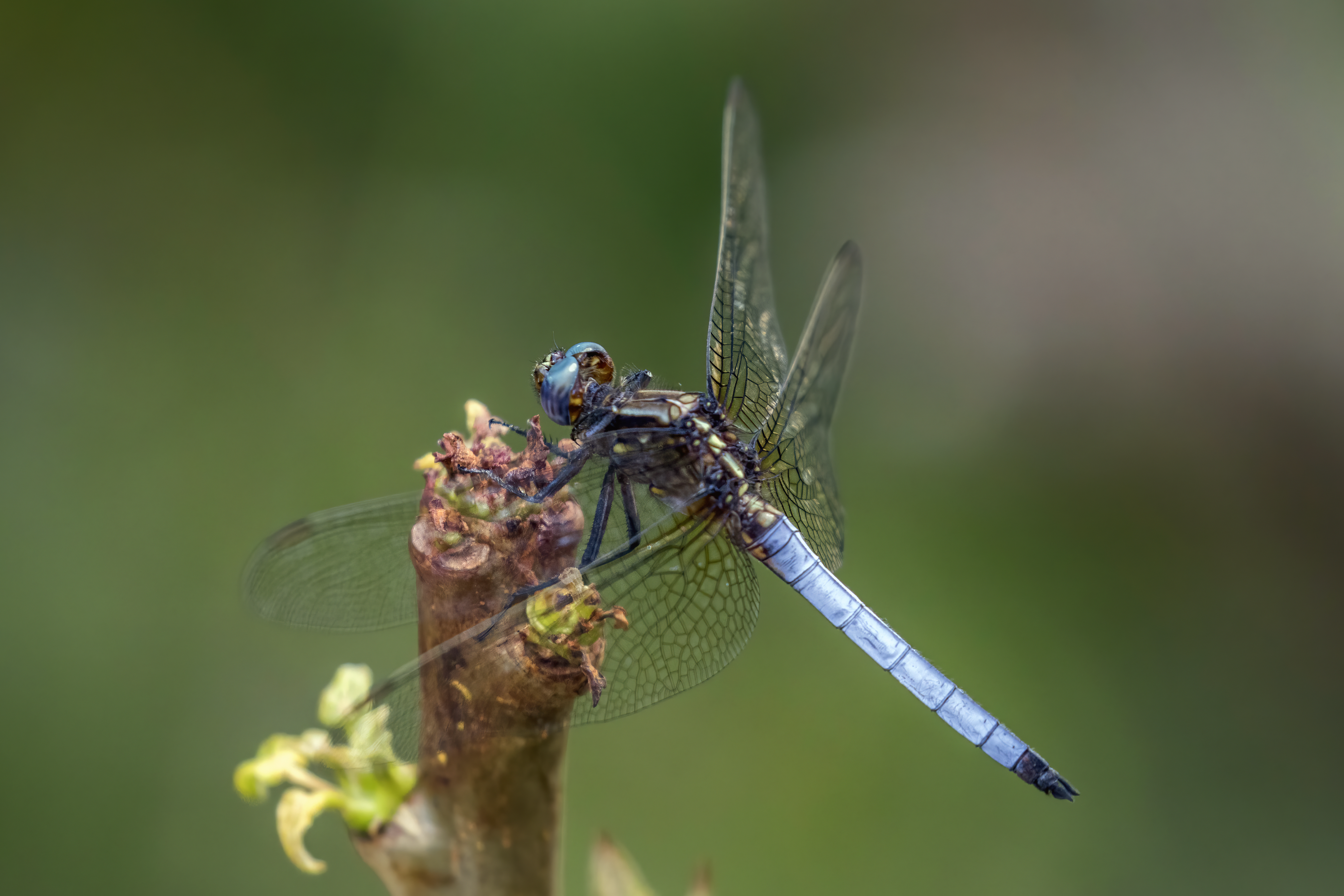
- male, Madagascar

Conservation status
- Least Concern (IUCN 3.1)

Scientific classification
- Kingdom: Animalia
- Phylum: Arthropoda
- Clade: Pancrustacea
- Class: Insecta
- Order: Odonata
- Infraorder: Anisoptera
- Family: Libellulidae
- Genus: Orthetrum
- Species: O. azureum

Binomial name
- Orthetrum azureum (Rambur, 1842)

= Orthetrum azureum =

Species of dragonfly

Orthetrum azureum is a freshwater dragonfly species, occurring on Madagascar. It is widely spread throughout the whole country, and can be found in various habitats, such as gardens and degraded forests.

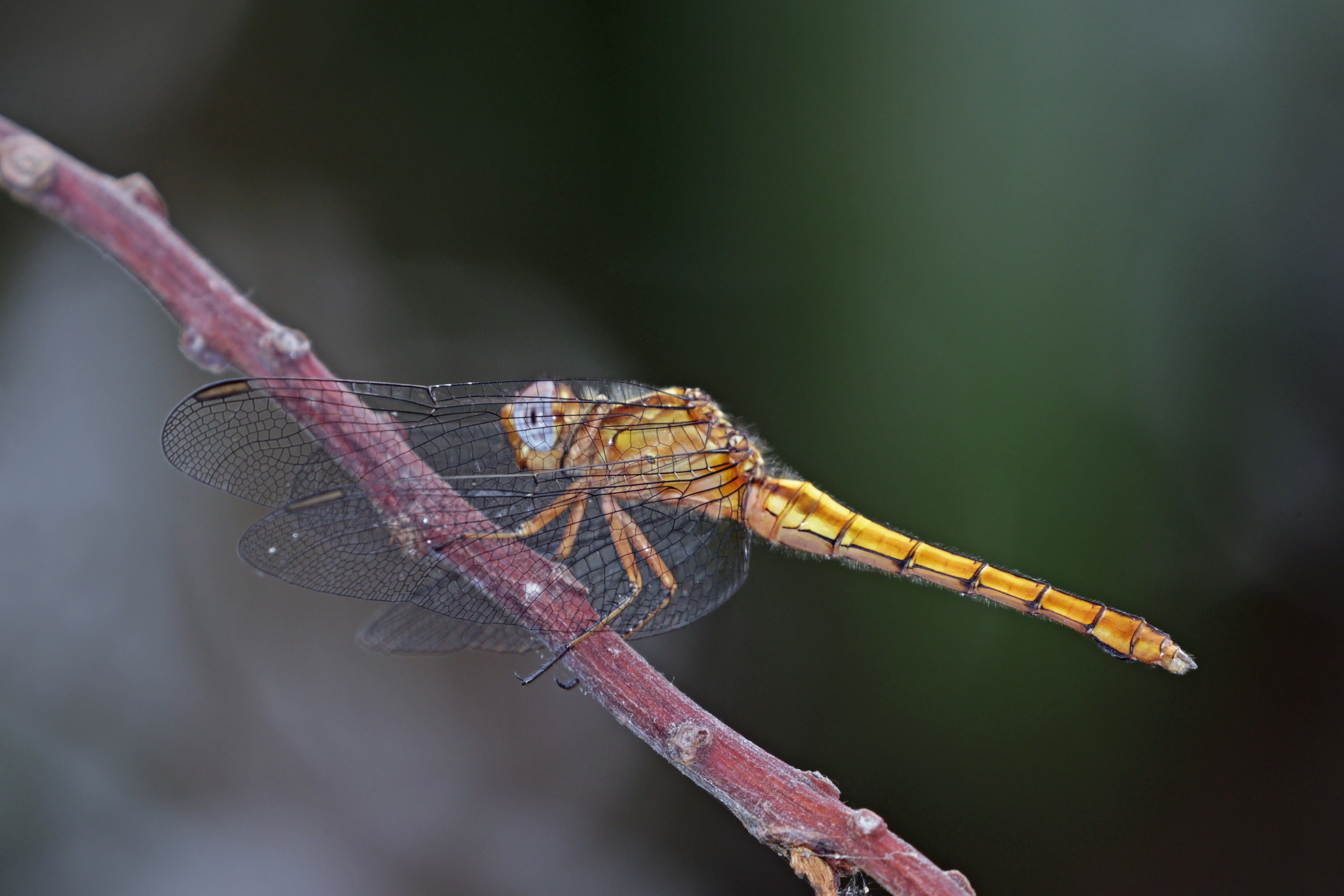

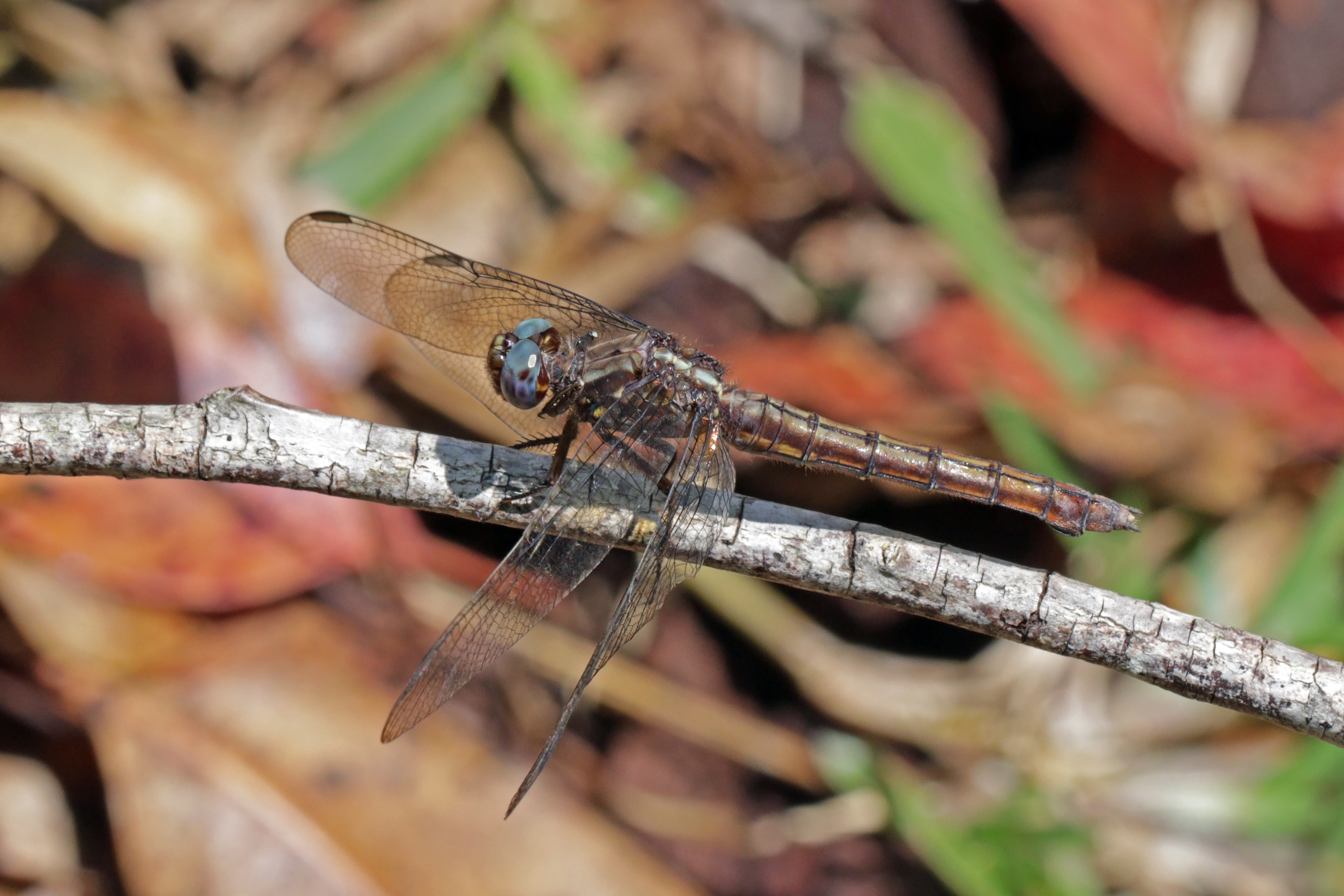

== See also ==
- Orthetrum
