= Orthetrum kristenseni =

Conservation status
- Least Concern (IUCN 3.1)

Scientific classification
- Kingdom: Animalia
- Phylum: Arthropoda
- Clade: Pancrustacea
- Class: Insecta
- Order: Odonata
- Infraorder: Anisoptera
- Family: Libellulidae
- Genus: Orthetrum
- Species: O. kristenseni

Binomial name
- Orthetrum kristenseni Ris, 1911

Species of dragonfly

Orthetrum kristenseni is a species of dragonfly in the family Libellulidae. It is endemic to Ethiopia. Its natural habitats are subtropical or tropical high-altitude grassland, rivers, and swamps. It is threatened by habitat loss.
