= Orthetrum guineense =

Conservation status
- Least Concern (IUCN 3.1)

Scientific classification
- Kingdom: Animalia
- Phylum: Arthropoda
- Clade: Pancrustacea
- Class: Insecta
- Order: Odonata
- Infraorder: Anisoptera
- Family: Libellulidae
- Genus: Orthetrum
- Species: O. guineense

Binomial name
- Orthetrum guineense Ris, 1910

Species of dragonfly

Orthetrum guineense is a species of dragonfly in the family Libellulidae. It is found in Angola, Benin, Burkina Faso, Cameroon, Central African Republic, the Republic of the Congo, the Democratic Republic of the Congo, Ivory Coast, Equatorial Guinea, Ethiopia, Gabon, Ghana, Guinea, Kenya, Liberia, Malawi, Mozambique, Namibia, Nigeria, Senegal, Sierra Leone, Somalia, South Africa, Tanzania, Togo, Uganda, Zambia, Zimbabwe, and possibly Burundi. Its natural habitats are dry savanna, moist savanna, subtropical or tropical dry shrubland, subtropical or tropical moist shrubland, and rivers.
