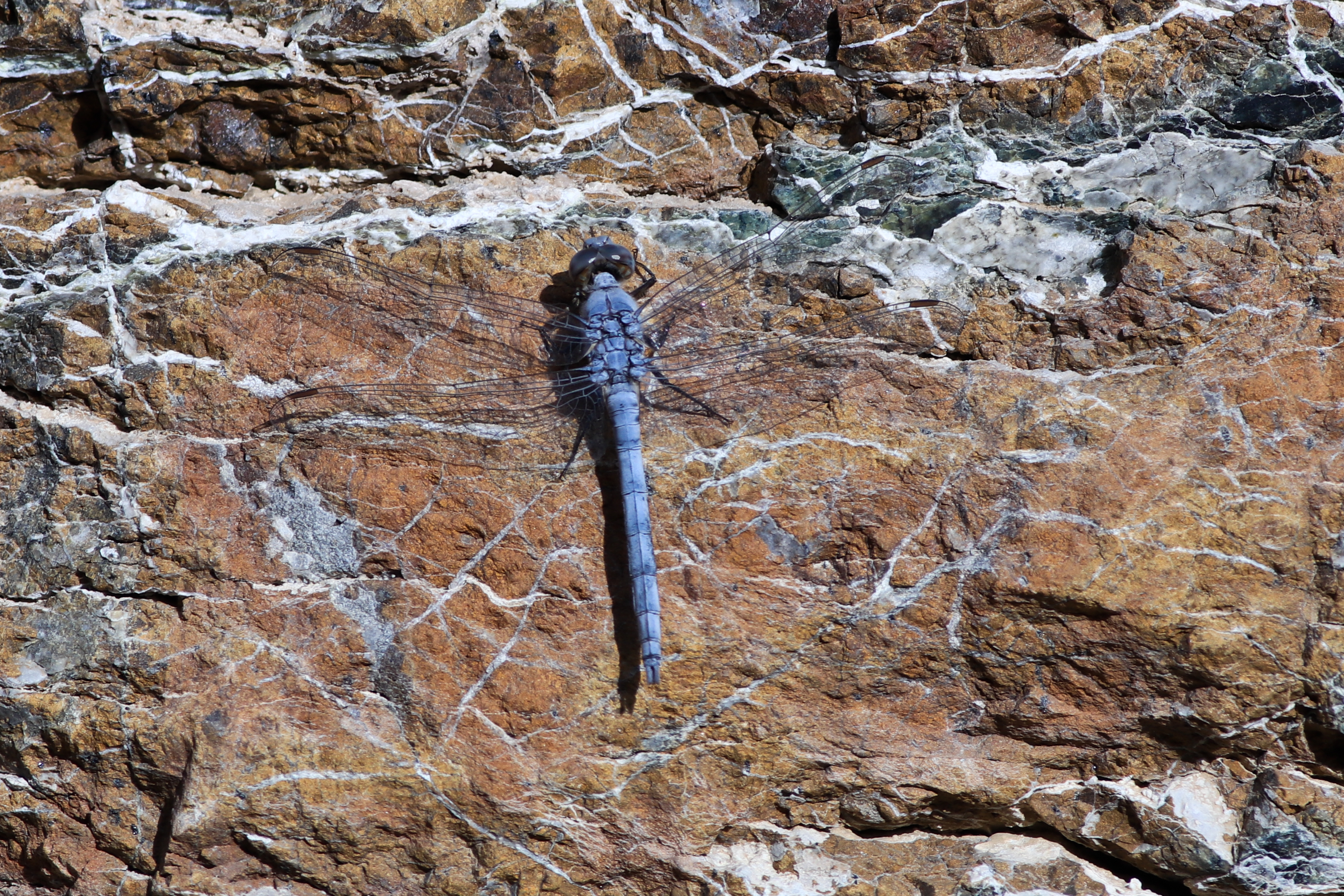
- Orthetrum ransonnetii – male

Scientific classification
- Kingdom: Animalia
- Phylum: Arthropoda
- Clade: Pancrustacea
- Class: Insecta
- Order: Odonata
- Infraorder: Anisoptera
- Family: Libellulidae
- Genus: Orthetrum
- Species: O. ransonnetii

Binomial name
- Orthetrum ransonnetii (Brauer, 1865)

= Orthetrum ransonnetii =

Species of dragonfly

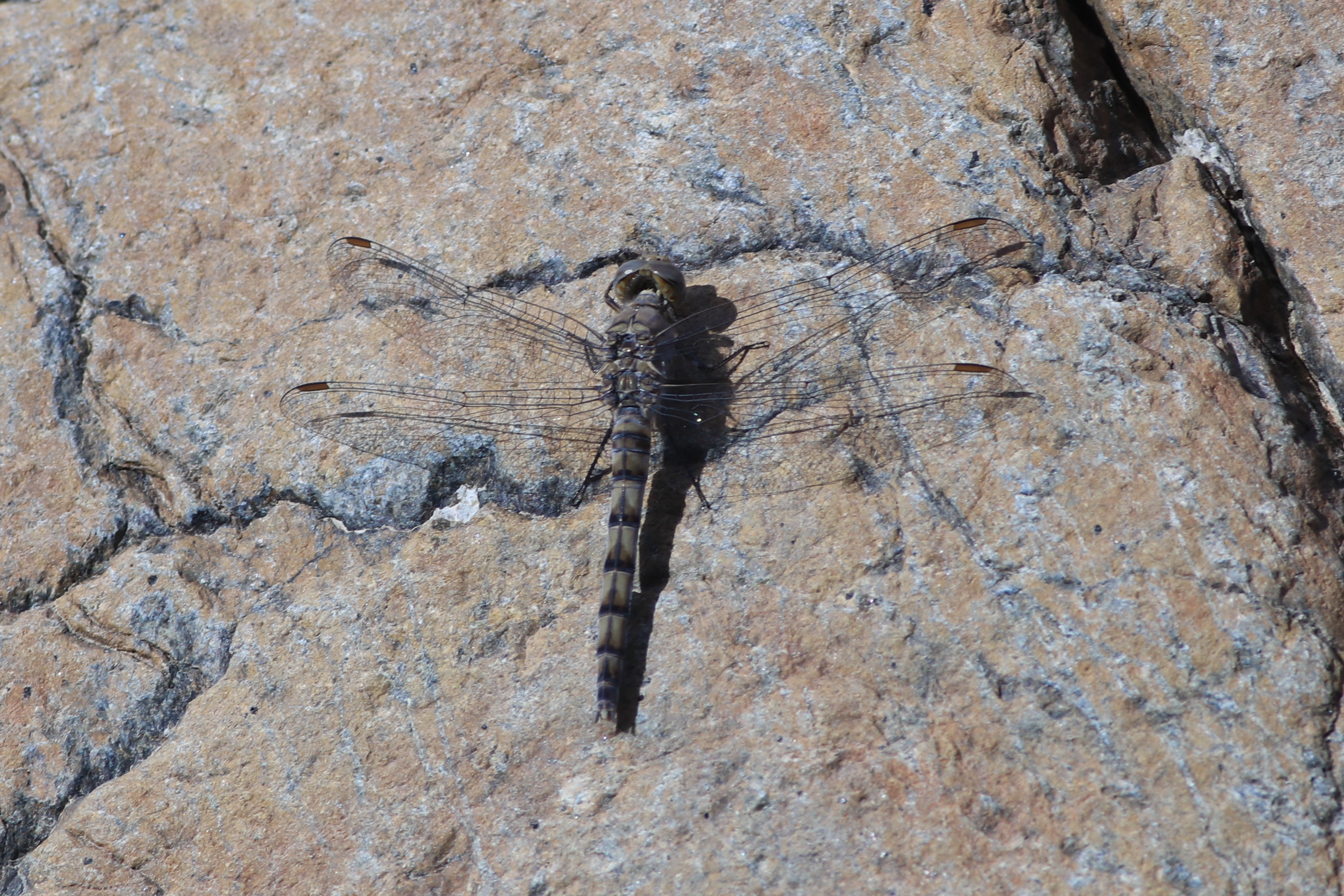
Orthetrum ransonnetii – female; picture taken in United Arab Emirates

Orthetrum ransonnetii, the desert skimmer or Ransonnet's skimmer, is a wide spread dragonfly species from Africa and the Middle East.

It is an oasis species in Northern West Africa and found in desert mountain areas of Western Sahara, Sudan, Niger, Chad, Algeria, Iran, Israel, Jordan, Egypt. It is also found in Arabia, especially in United Arab Emirates and Oman very commonly in Wadis. In 2018 this species was identified from an image taken on the Canary Island of Fuerteventura Spain and as such a first sighting in Europe. It now breeds in several Barranco on the island .
