= Orthetrum sagitta =

Conservation status
- Least Concern (IUCN 3.1)

Scientific classification
- Kingdom: Animalia
- Phylum: Arthropoda
- Clade: Pancrustacea
- Class: Insecta
- Order: Odonata
- Infraorder: Anisoptera
- Family: Libellulidae
- Genus: Orthetrum
- Species: O. sagitta

Binomial name
- Orthetrum sagitta (Ris, 1915)

Species of dragonfly

Orthetrum sagitta is a freshwater dragonfly species present in Africa. Its appearance is confirmed only in Sierra Leone, the records from Chad, Egypt, Nigeria and Sudan appear as misidentification. The common name for this species is Arrow Skimmer.

== See also ==
- Orthetrum
