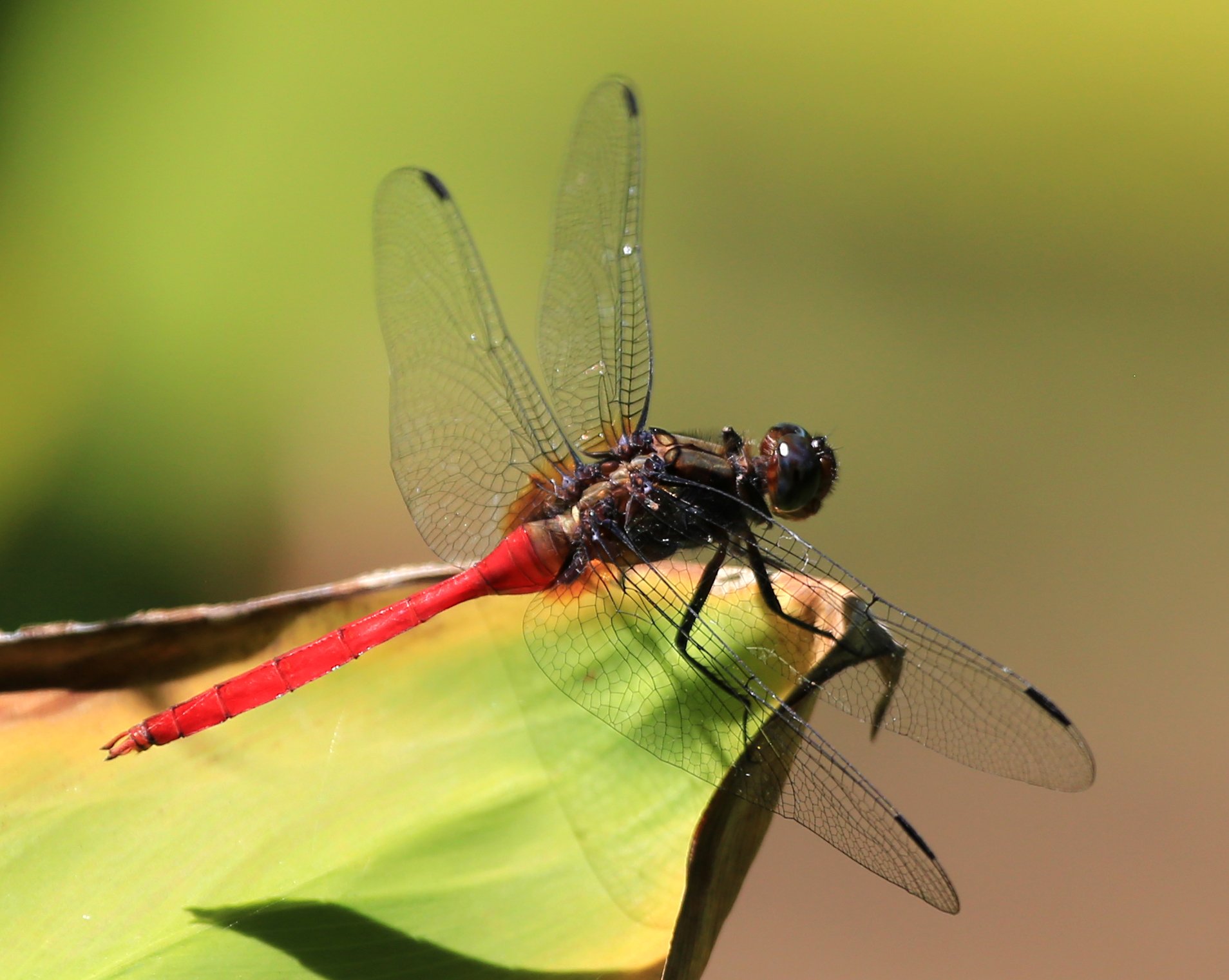
- A male fiery skimmer, Cairns
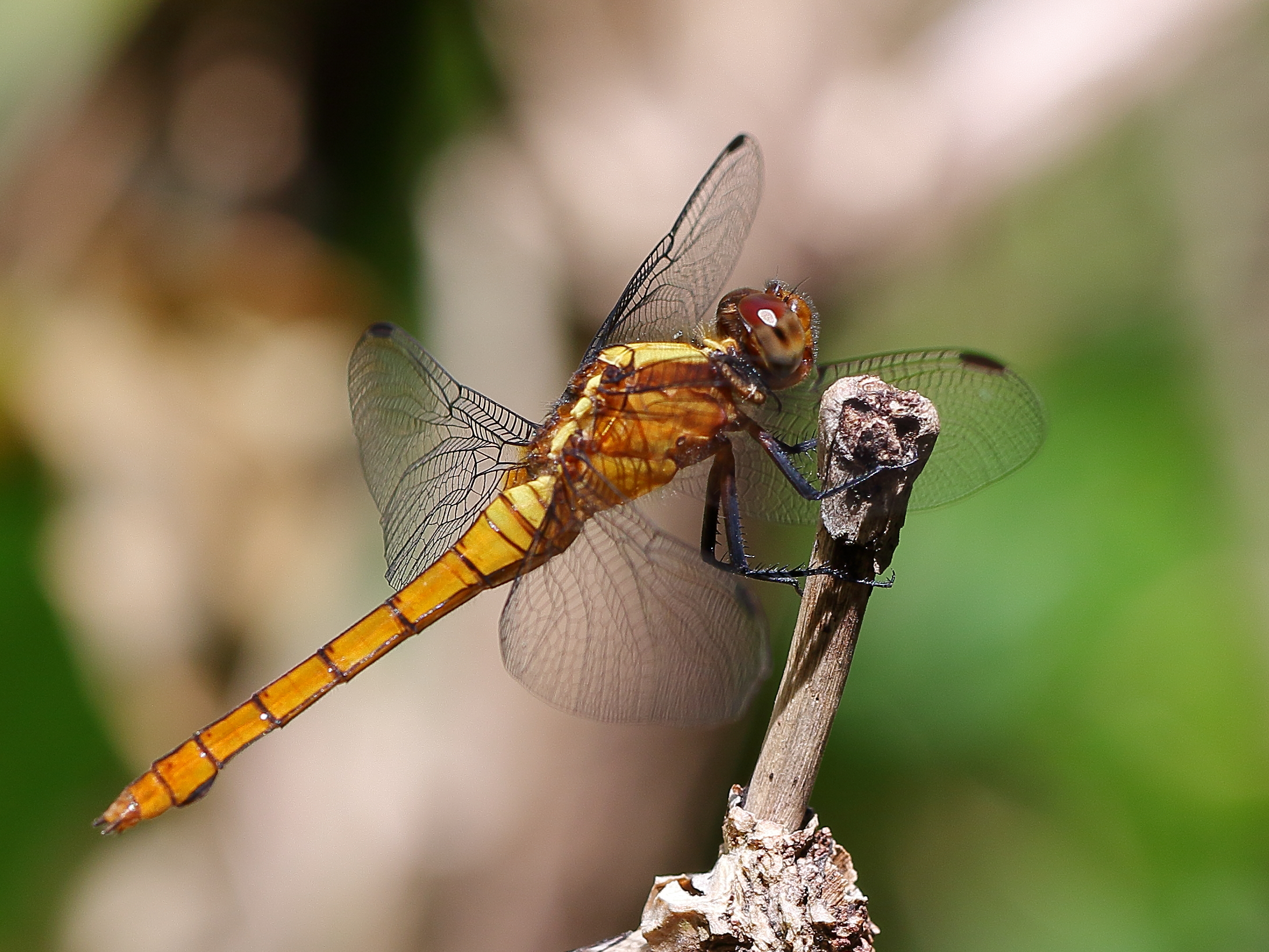
- Female

Conservation status
- Least Concern (IUCN 3.1)

Scientific classification
- Kingdom: Animalia
- Phylum: Arthropoda
- Clade: Pancrustacea
- Class: Insecta
- Order: Odonata
- Infraorder: Anisoptera
- Superfamily: Libelluloidea
- Family: Libellulidae
- Genus: Orthetrum
- Species: O. villosovittatum

Binomial name
- Orthetrum villosovittatum (Brauer, 1868)

Synonyms
- Libellula villosovittata Brauer, 1868; Orthetrum bismarckianum Ris, 1898; Orthetrum fenicheli Förster, 1898

= Orthetrum villosovittatum =

Fiery skimmer

Species of dragonfly

Orthetrum villosovittatum, known as the fiery skimmer, is a species of dragonfly in the family Libellulidae. Its range is from the Moluccas, New Guinea and neighbouring islands as well as Australia. In Australia it is found in Victoria through eastern New South Wales and Queensland, north inland Queensland, Cape York Peninsula and north Northern Territory. It is a common species through most of its range.

Orthetrum villosovittatum is a medium-sized dragonfly with a wingspan of 60–85 mm. Mature males have dark greyish to greenish-brown thoraxes and red abdomens, with the abdomen constricted at segment four. Young males have an amber and black colouring. Females are ochre-coloured.

Orthetrum villosovittatum inhabits boggy seepages, streams and swamps.

== Etymology ==
The genus name Orthetrum is derived from the Greek ὀρθός (orthos, "straight") and ἦτρον (ētron, "abdomen"), referring to the parallel-sided abdomen of the genus.

The species name villosovittatum is derived from the Latin villosus ("shaggy" or "hairy") and vittatus ("banded" or "striped"), referring to the hairy dark streak on the side of the thorax.

== Gallery ==
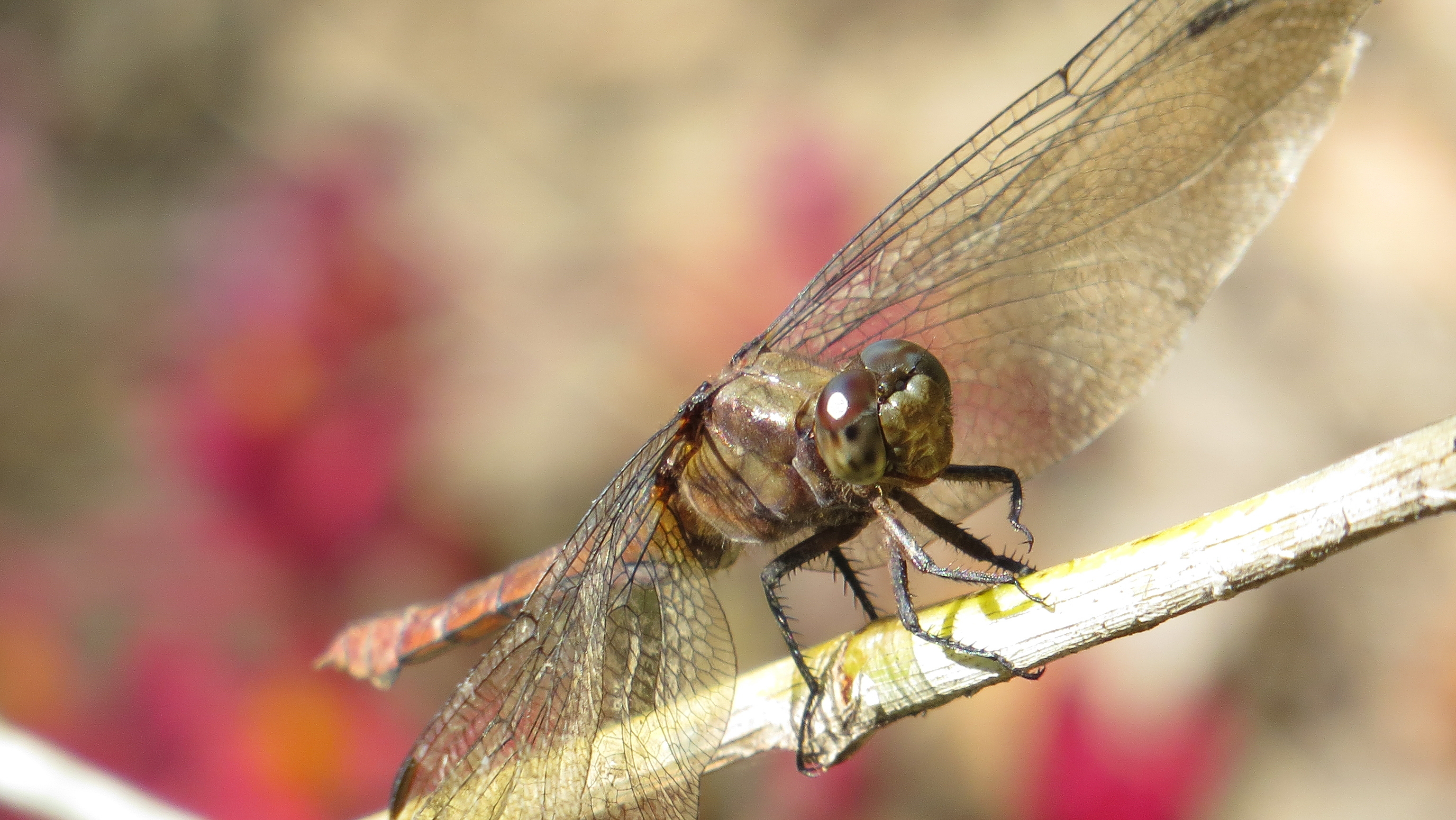
Female face on

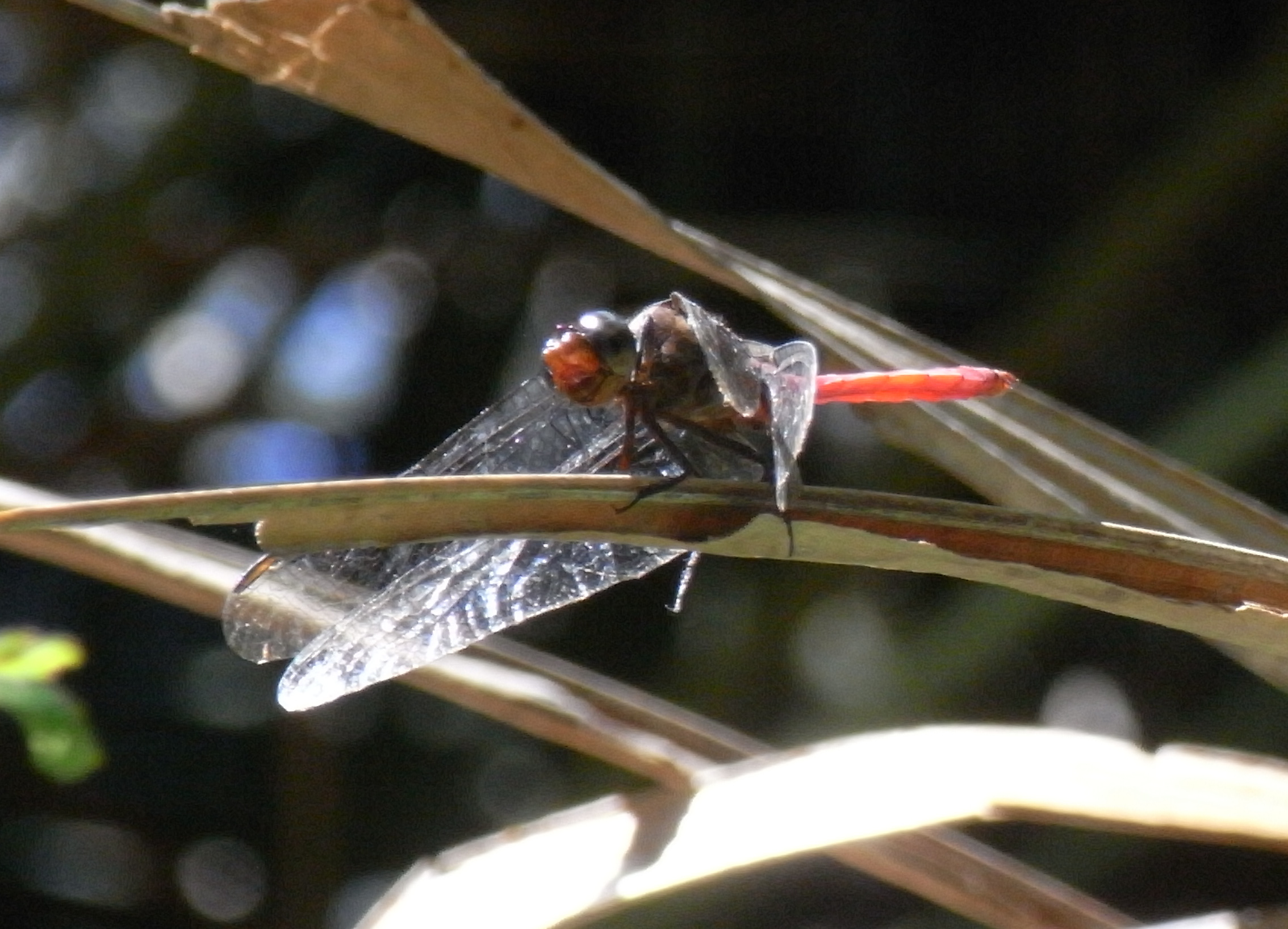
Male face on

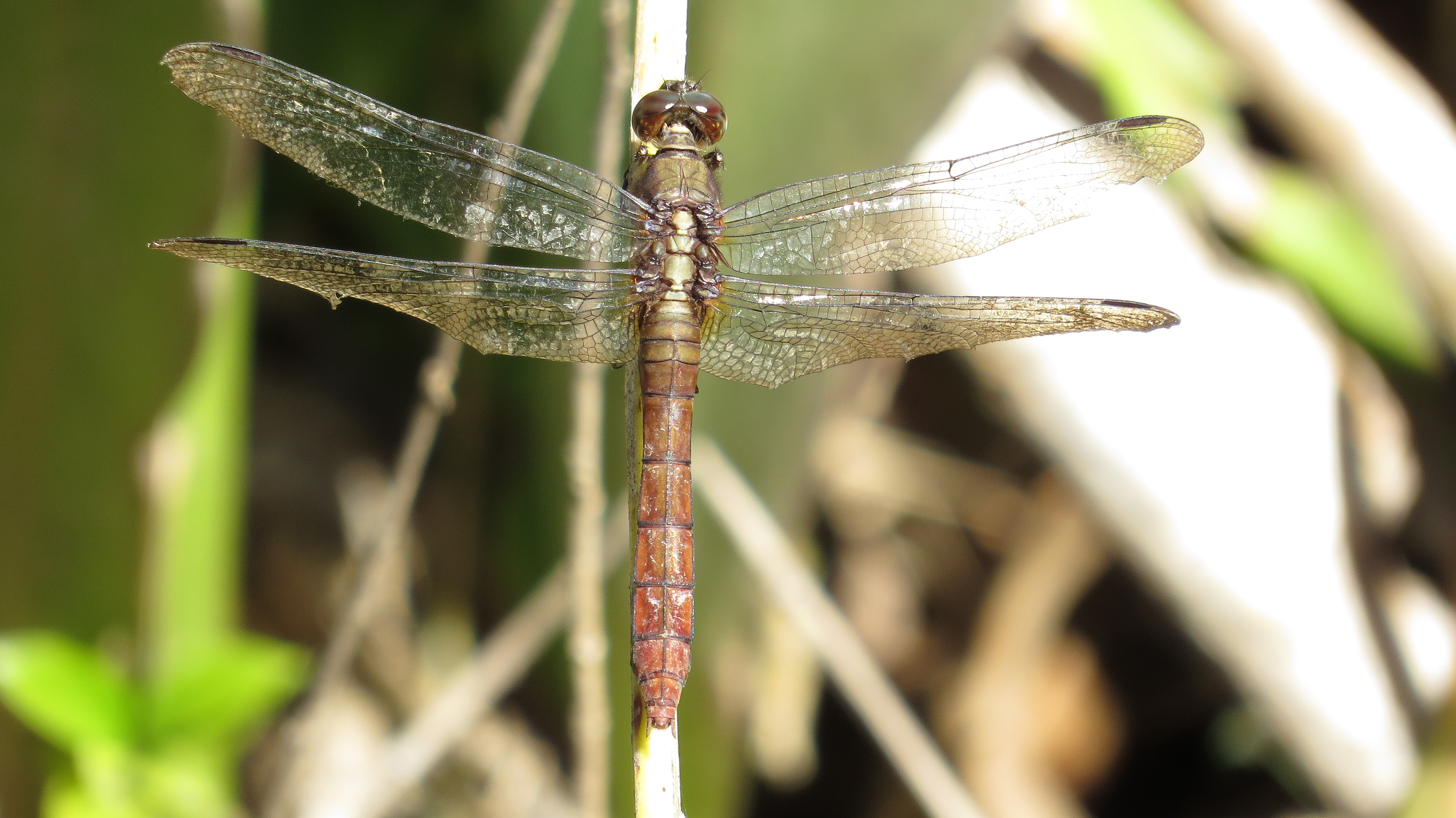
Female

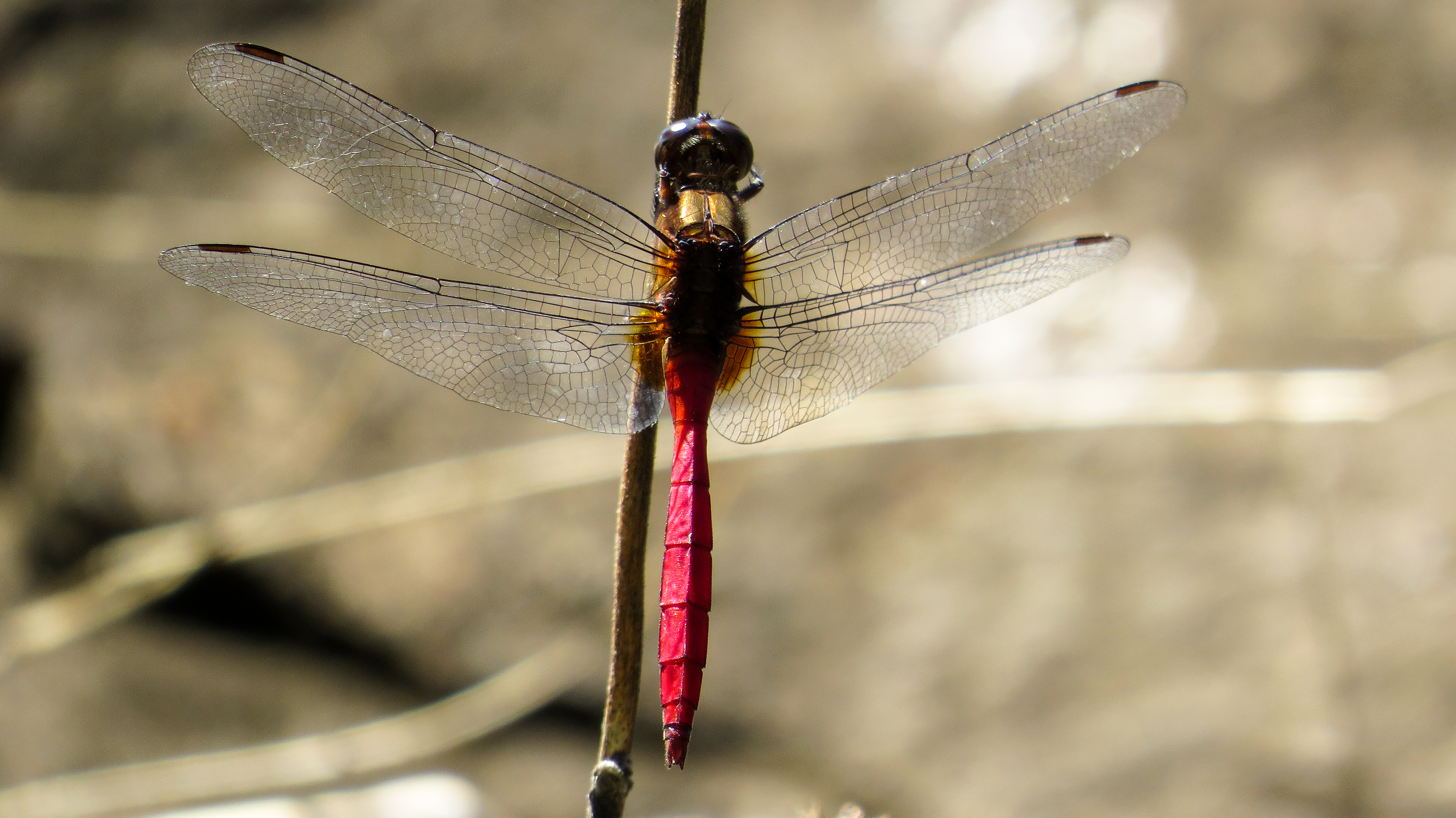
Male

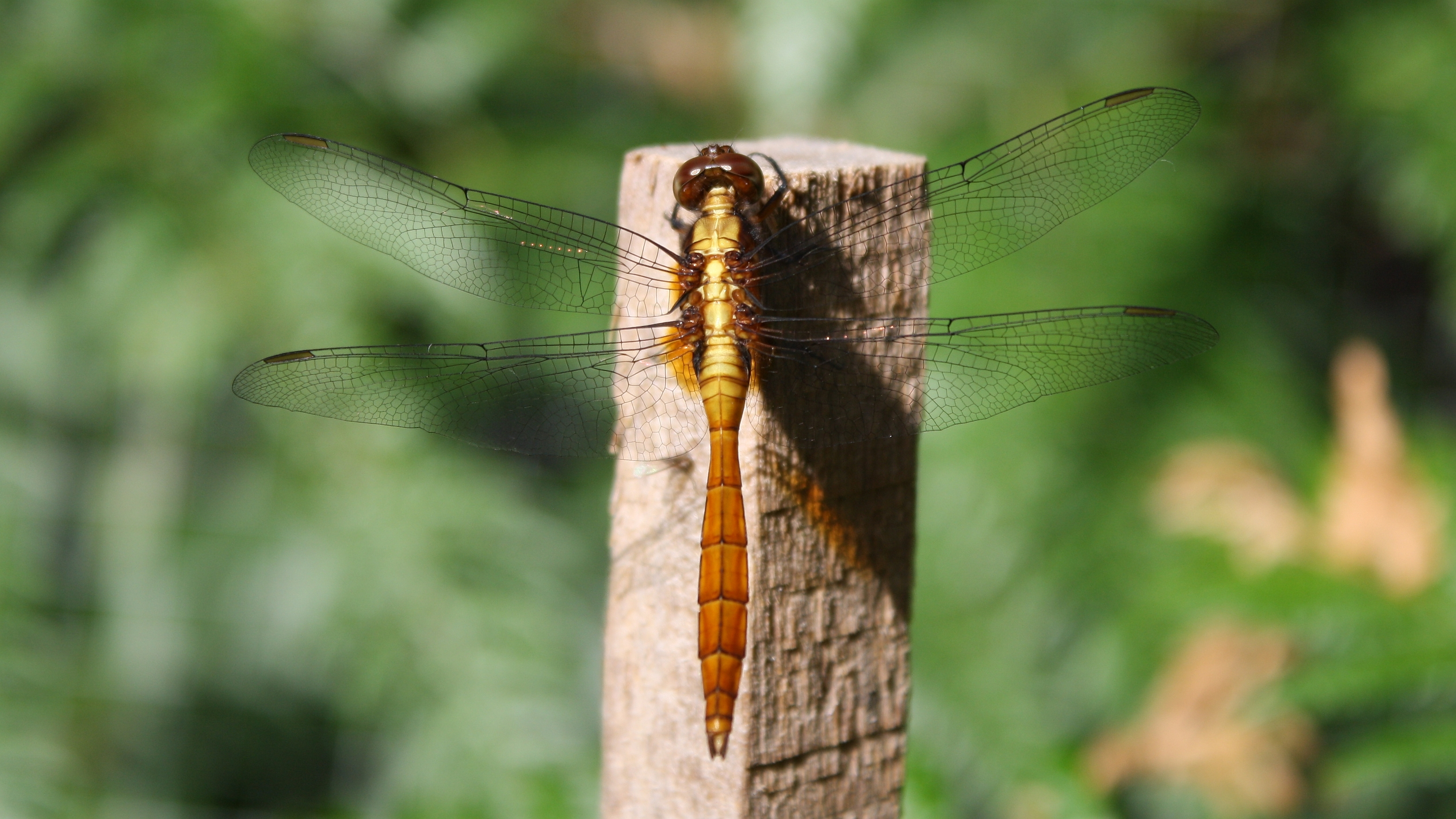
Young males are an orange colour

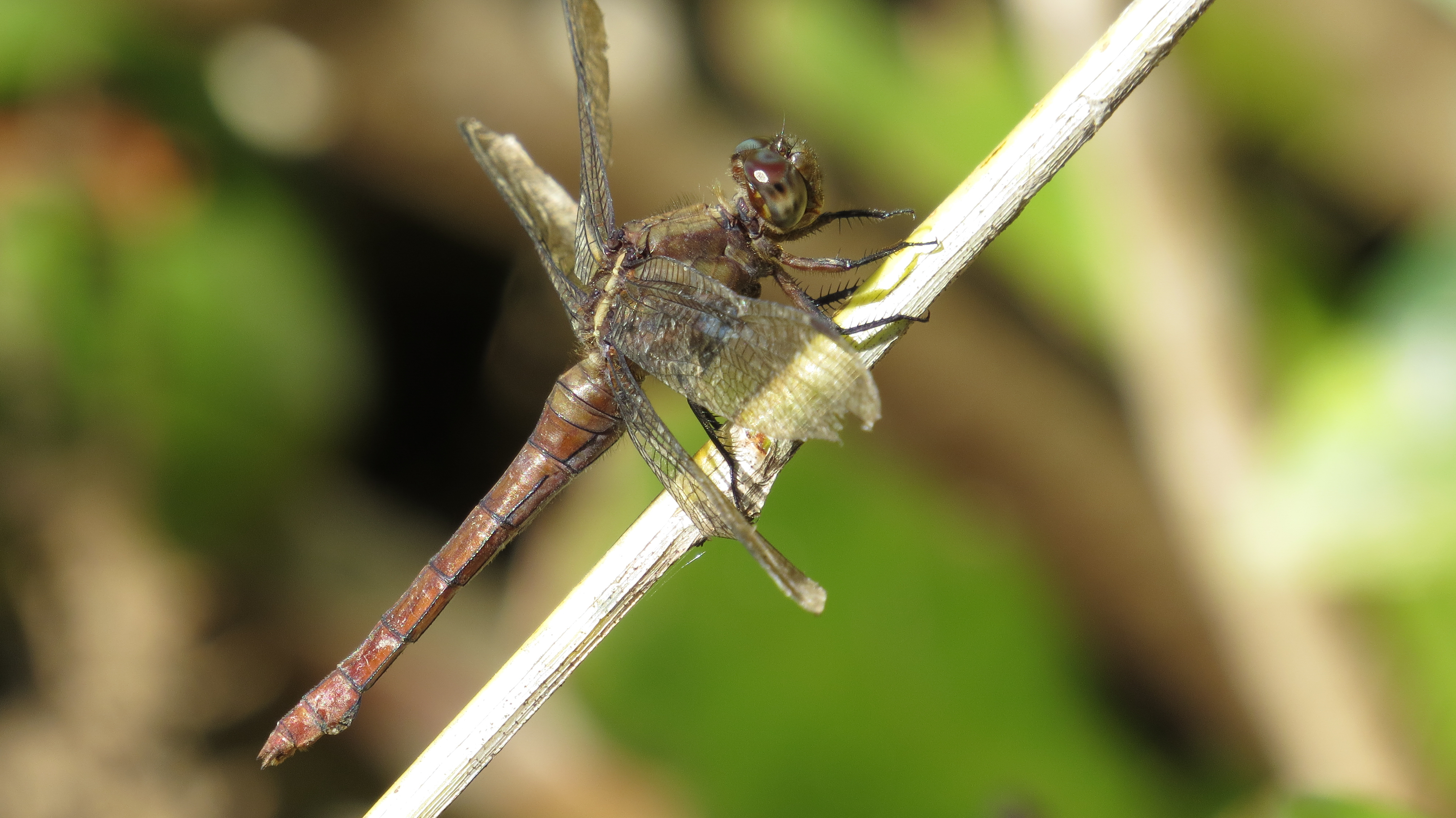
Female side view

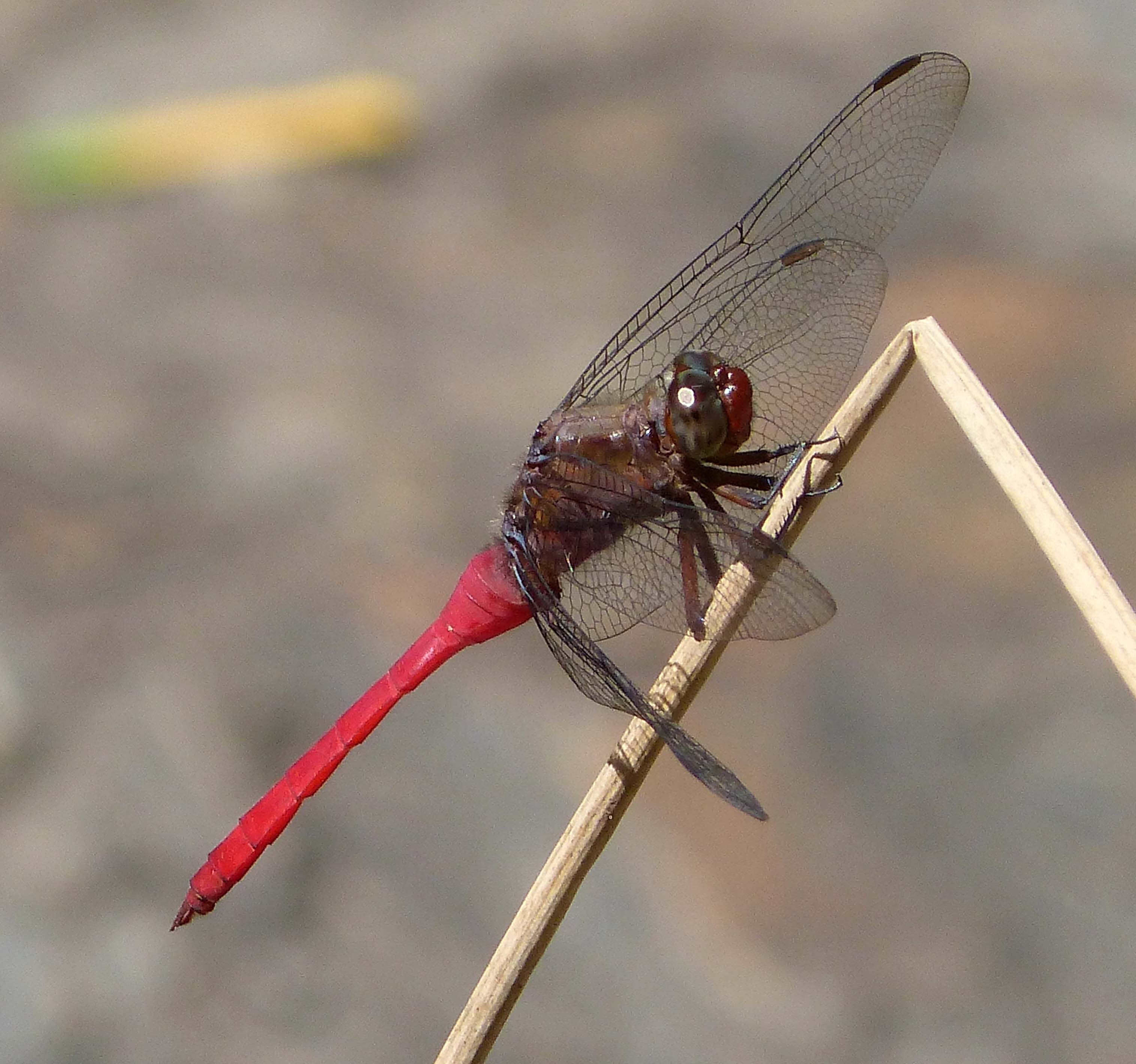
Male side view

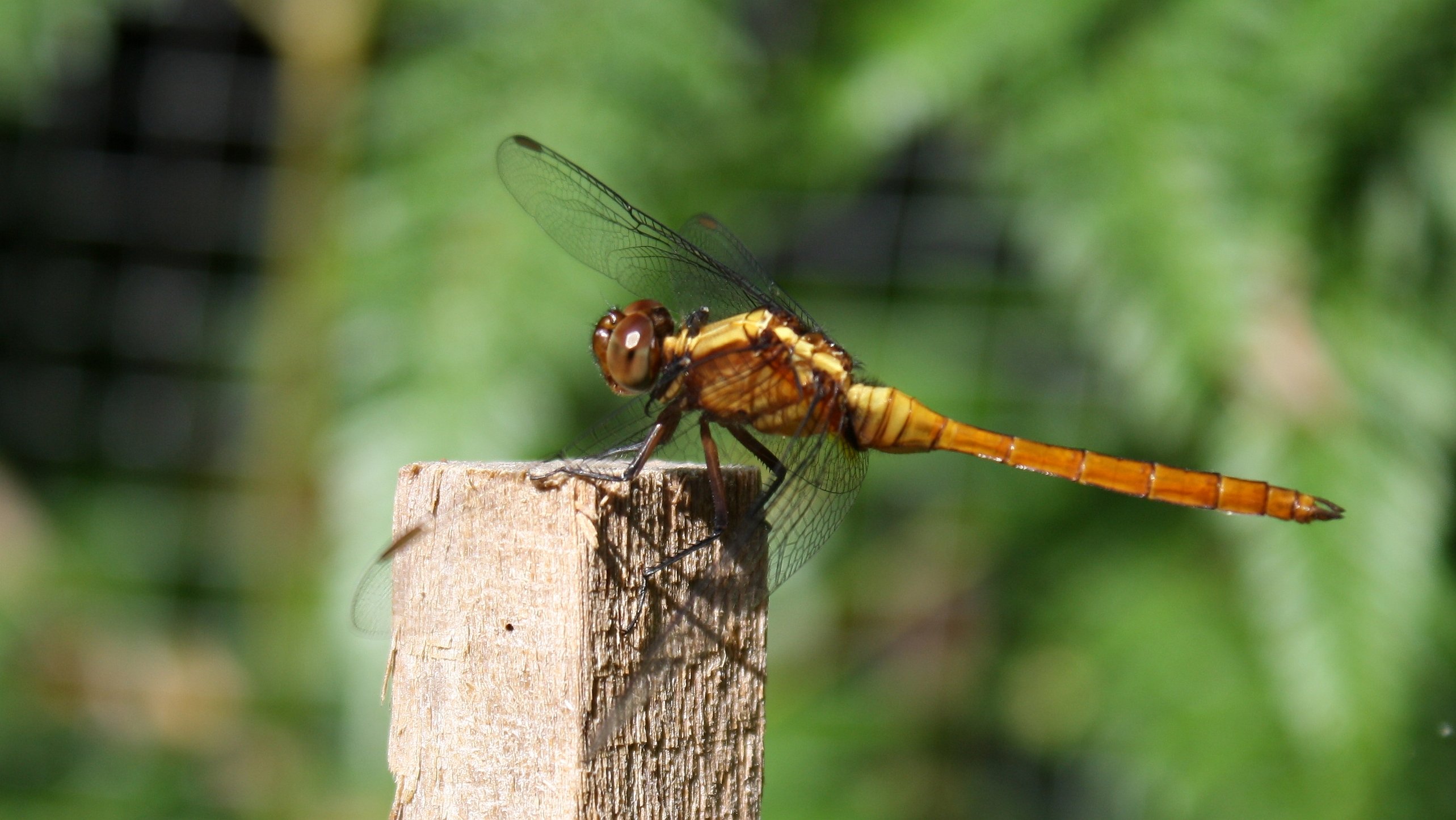
Young male side view

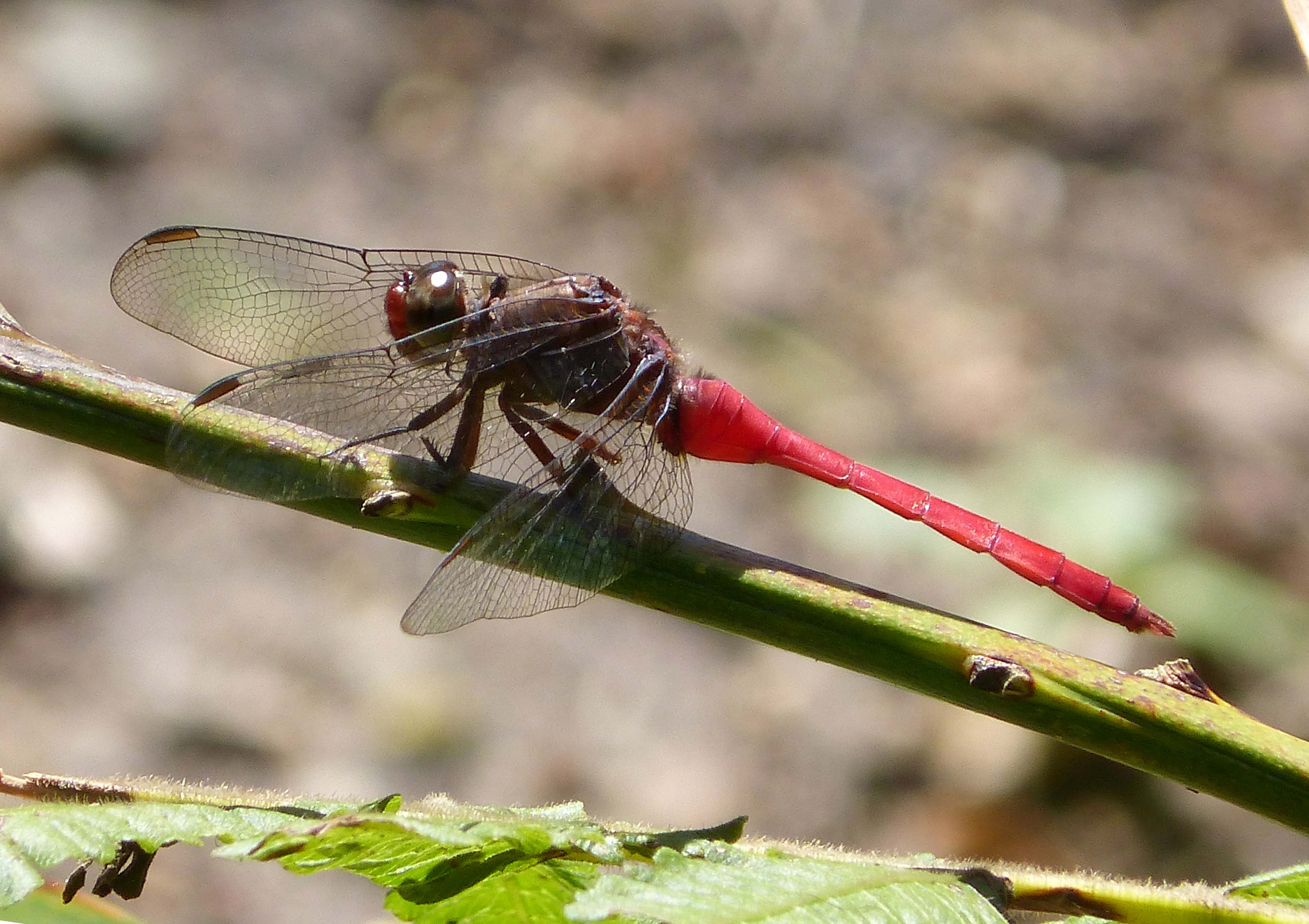
Resting with wings held forward

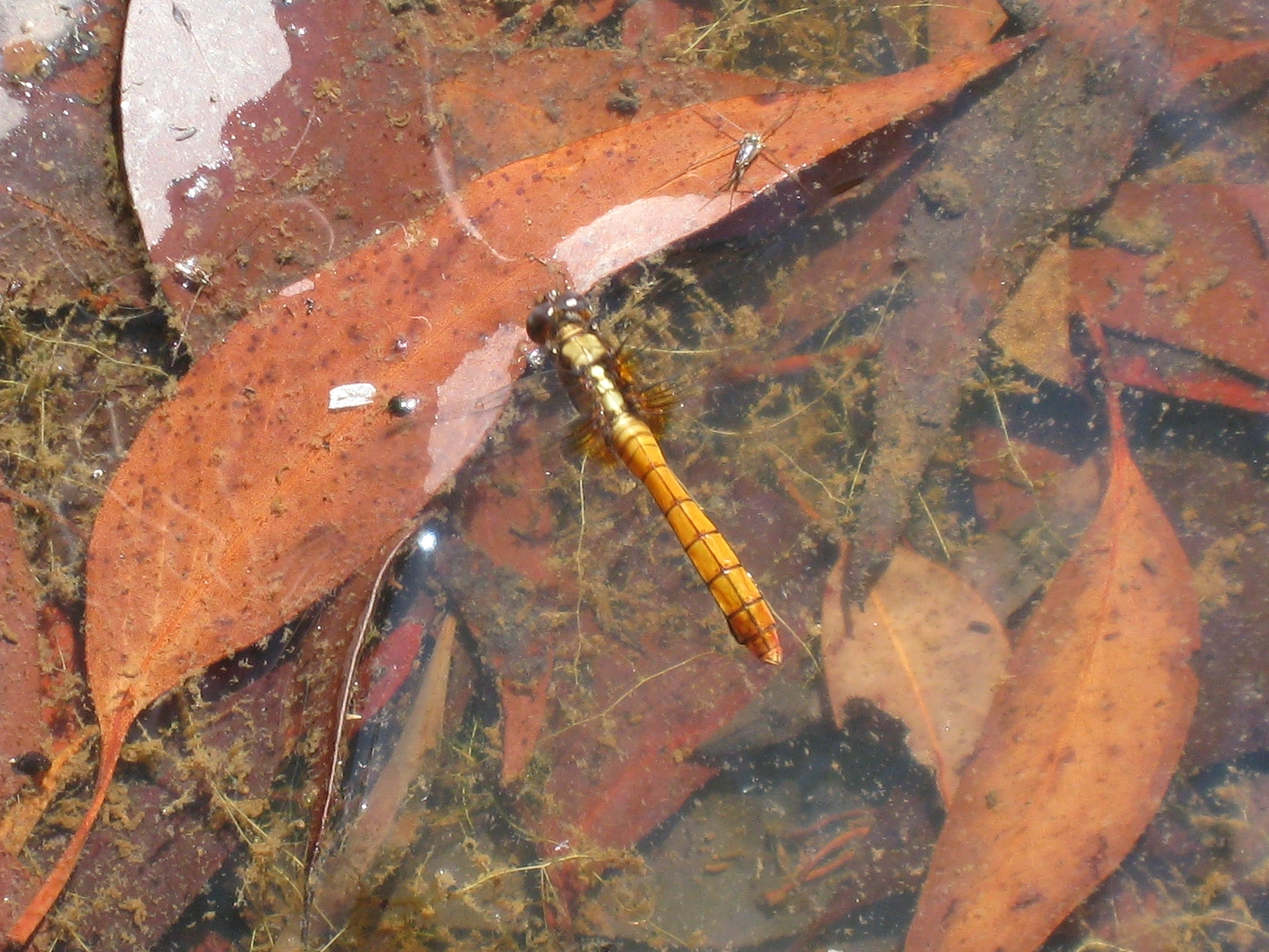
Female looking to deposit her eggs in a pond

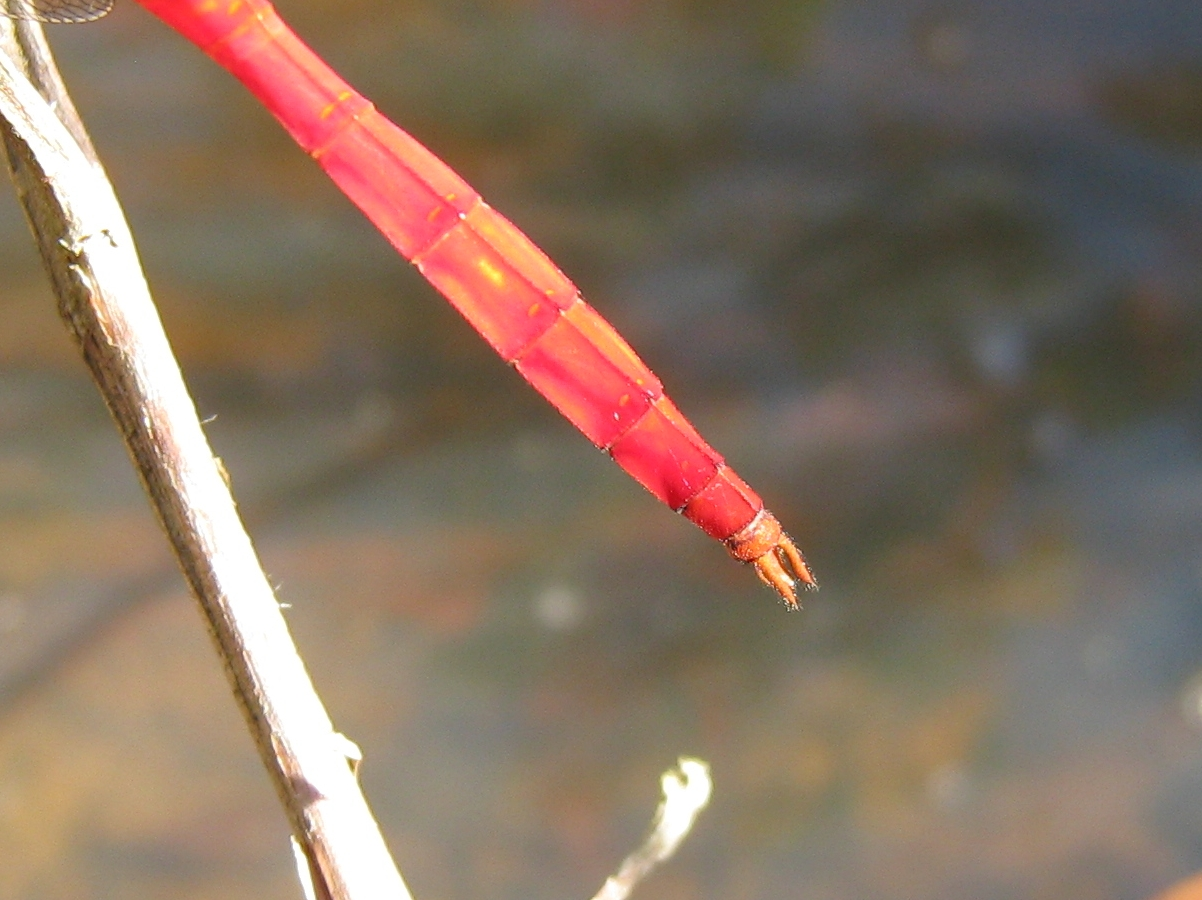
Male tail

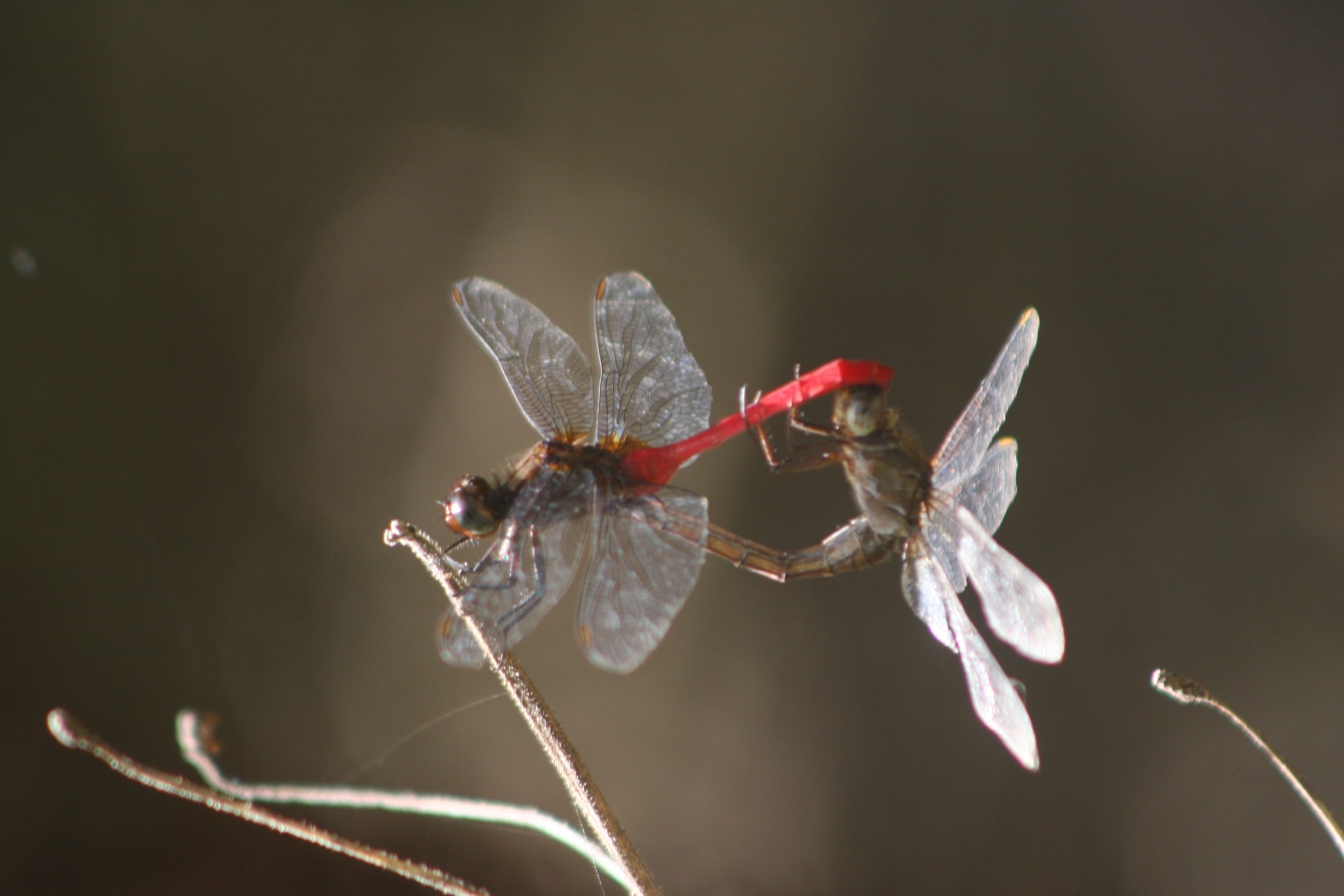
Mating pair

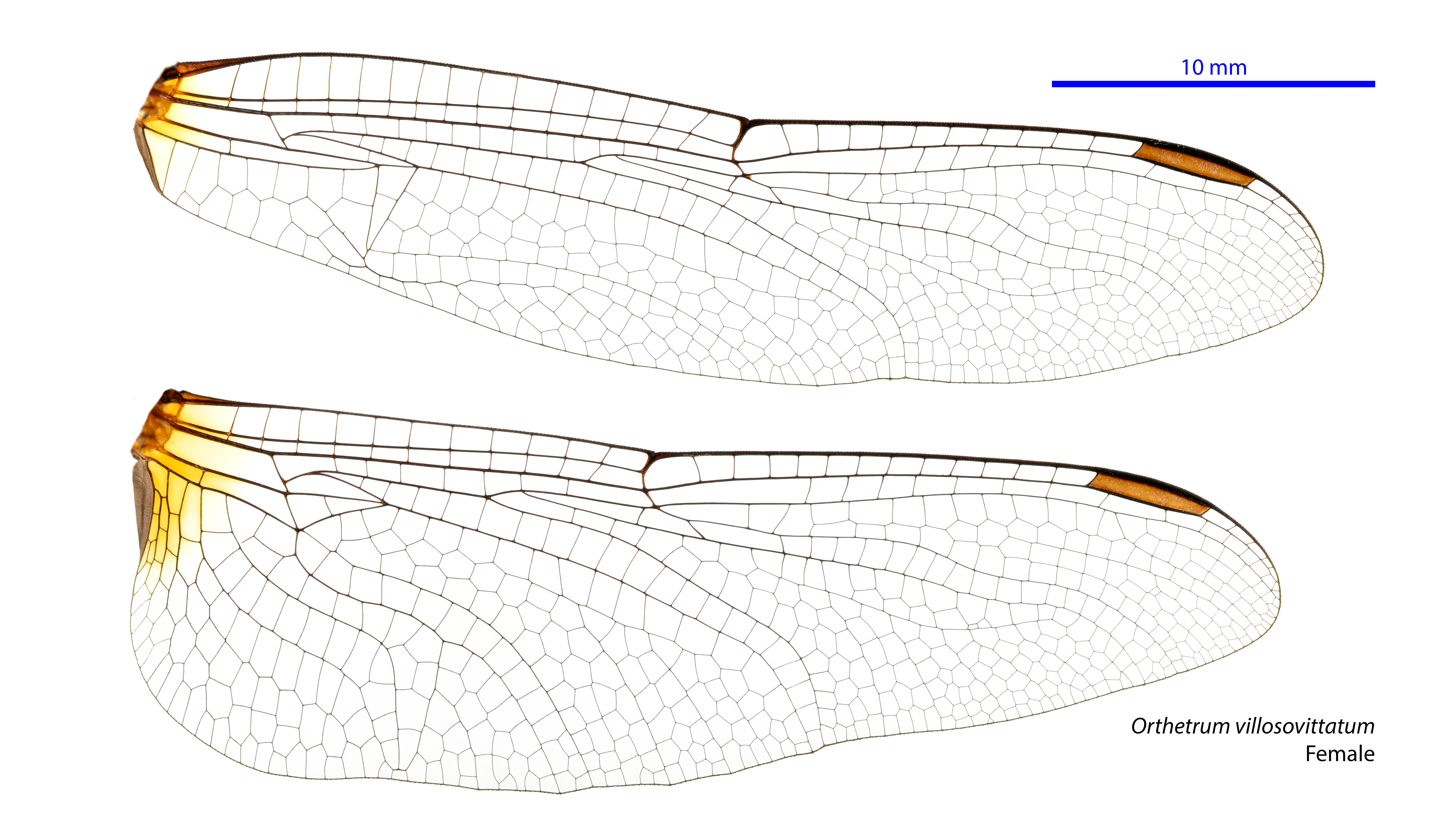
Female wings

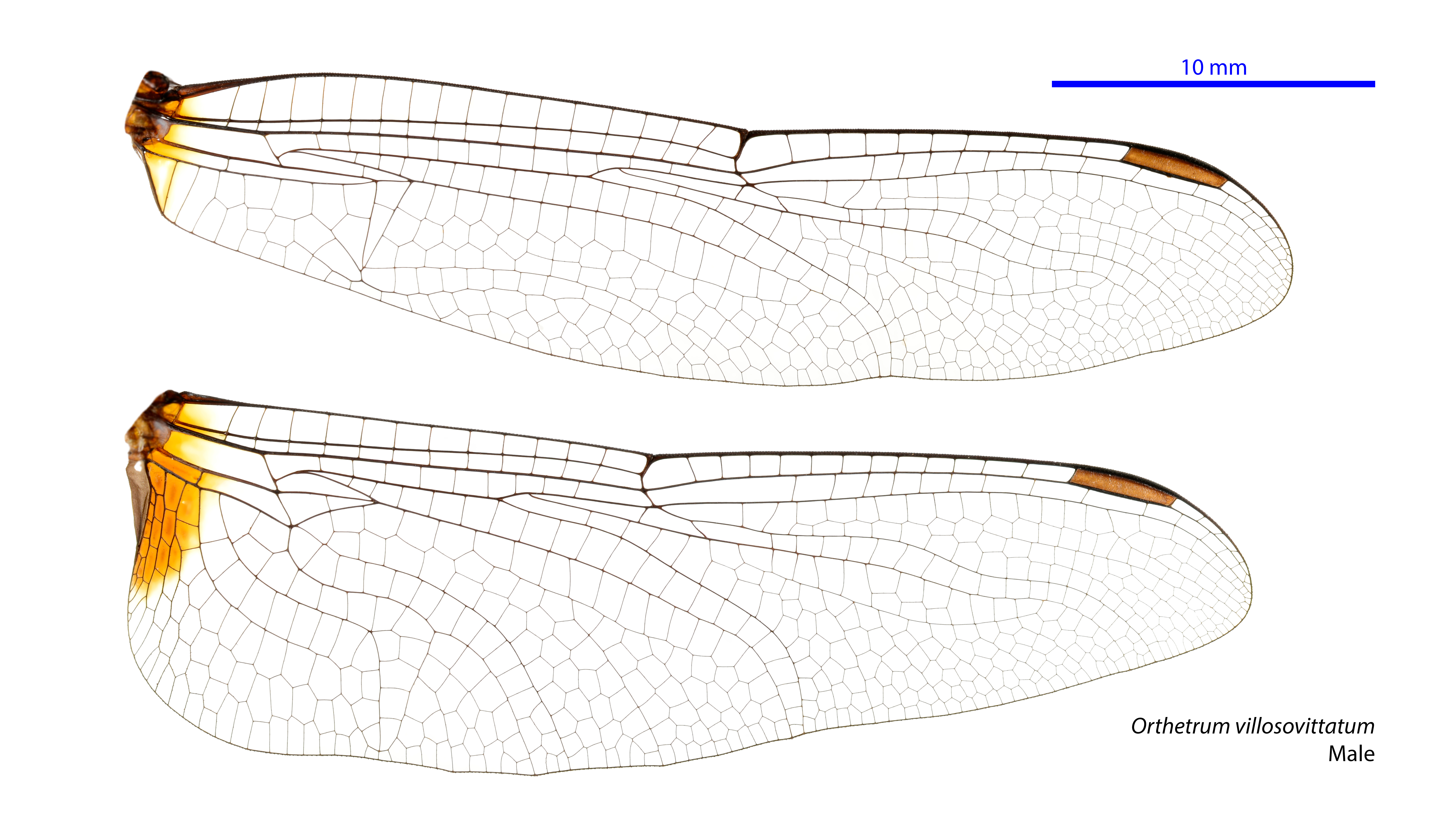
Male wings
