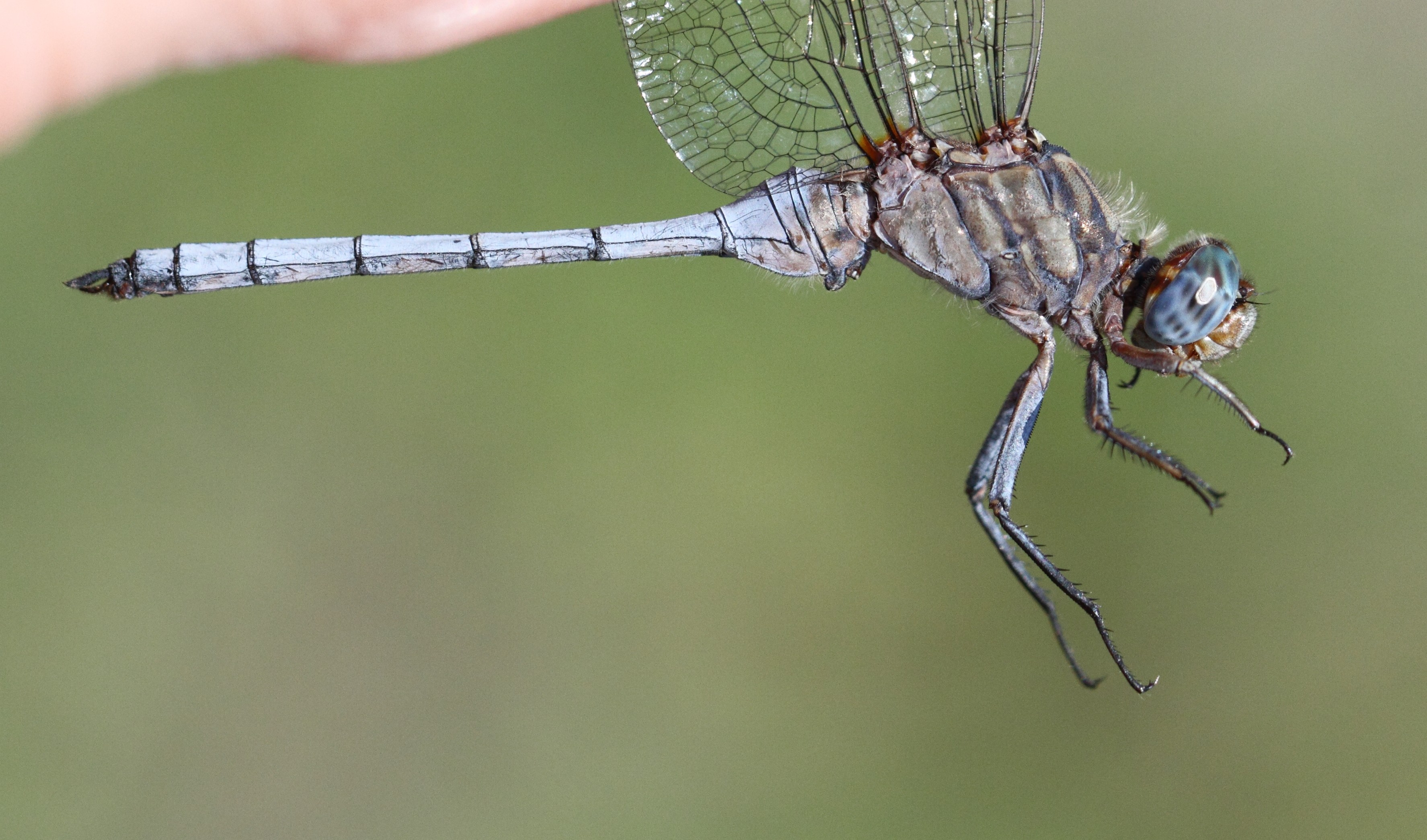
- Male

Conservation status
- Least Concern (IUCN 3.1)

Scientific classification
- Kingdom: Animalia
- Phylum: Arthropoda
- Clade: Pancrustacea
- Class: Insecta
- Order: Odonata
- Infraorder: Anisoptera
- Family: Libellulidae
- Genus: Orthetrum
- Species: O. monardi

Binomial name
- Orthetrum monardi Schmidt, 1951

= Orthetrum monardi =

Species of dragonfly

Orthetrum monardi is a species of dragonfly in the family Libellulidae. It is found in Angola, Benin, Burkina Faso, Cameroon, Central African Republic, the Republic of the Congo, Ivory Coast, Ethiopia, Gambia, Ghana, Guinea, Guinea-Bissau, Kenya, Nigeria, Sierra Leone, Tanzania, Uganda, and Zambia. Its natural habitat is subtropical or tropical swamps.
