= List of Odonata species of Senegal =

Senegal is a semi-arid country situated at the western tip of Africa. The following is a list of the dragonflies and damselflies that have been documented in Senegal. Due to a lack of biological surveys in this area, this list is likely to be incomplete.

== Dragonflies & Damselflies ==
Phylum: Arthropoda Class: Insecta Order: Odonata

Dragonflies are predators. The larvae inhabit water and adults fly near aquatic places. They are diverse in color and shape. There are major 2 types of odonates in the world; they are dragonflies and damselflies. The eyes are closer together in dragonflies, and their wings are held broadly opened from the body. They are robust in nature. In contrast, damselflies are delicately built small odonates, with well separated compound eyes. During rest, they do not expand their wings; the wings are folded over the abdomen or slightly spread.

Damselflies are categorized in to Suborder: Zygoptera; and dragonflies into Suborder: Anisoptera. 106 described species from 11 families can be found in Senegal.

=== Suborder: Zygoptera - Damselflies ===
Damselflies are insects of the suborder Zygoptera in the order Odonata. They are similar to dragonflies, which constitute the other odonatan suborder, Anisoptera, but are smaller, have slimmer bodies, and most species fold the wings along the body when at rest. An ancient group, damselflies have existed since at least the Lower Permian, and are found on every continent except Antarctica.

All damselflies are predatory; both nymphs and adults eat other insects. The nymphs are aquatic, with different species living in a variety of freshwater habitats including acid bogs, ponds, lakes and rivers. The nymphs moult repeatedly, at the last moult climbing out of the water to undergo metamorphosis. The skin splits down the back, they emerge and inflate their wings and abdomen to gain their adult form. Their presence on a body of water indicates that it is relatively unpolluted, but their dependence on freshwater makes them vulnerable to damage to their wetland habitats.

The following 31 Damselfly species have been documented in Senegal

==== Family: Calopterygidae - Jewelwings ====
Common name	Binomial	Local subspecies	Male	Female
Glistening Demoiselle	Phaon iridipennis			
Smokewing/Cloudwing/Mistwing	Sapho fumosa			
Sapho infumosa	Sapho infumosa			

==== Family: Chlorocyphidae - Jewels ====
Common name	Binomial	Local subspecies	Male	Female
Blue-tipped jewel	Chlorocypha curta			
Little red jewel	Chlorocypha dispar			

==== Family: Coenagrionidae - Narrow-winged damselflies ====
Common name	Binomial	Local subspecies	Male	Female
Aciagrion africanum	Aciagrion africanum			
Africallagma subtile	Africallagma subtile			
Agriocnemis exilis	Agriocnemis exilis			
Agriocnemis maclachlani	Agriocnemis maclachlani			
Victoria wisp	Agriocnemis victoria			
Agriocnemis zerafica	Agriocnemis zerafica			
Azuragrion vansomereni	Azuragrion vansomereni			
Ceriagrion corallinum	Ceriagrion corallinum			
Common orange	Ceriagrion glabrum			
Ceriagrion suave	Ceriagrion suave			
Marsh bluetail	Ischnura senegalensis			
Pseudagrion camerunense	Pseudagrion camerunense			
Pseudagrion emarginatum	Pseudagrion emarginatum			
Pseudagrion glaucescens	Pseudagrion glaucescens			
Swarthy sprite	Pseudagrion hamoni			
Black-and-yellow sprite	Pseudagrion melanicterum			
Bluetail sprite	Pseudagrion nubicum			
Cherry-eye sprite	Pseudagrion sublacteum			
Pseudagrion torridum	Pseudagrion torridum			

==== Family: Lestidae - Spreadwings ====
Common name	Binomial	Local subspecies	Male	Female
Cryptic spreadwing	Lestes dissimulans			
Tawny spreadwing	Lestes ictericus			
Pallid spreadwing	Lestes pallidus			

==== Family: Platycnemididae - Threadtails ====
Common name	Binomial	Local subspecies	Male	Female
Black threadtail	Elattoneura nigra			
Elattoneura pluotae	Elattoneura pluotae			
Mesocnemis dupuyi	Mesocnemis dupuyi			
Platycnemis sikassoensis	Platycnemis sikassoensis			

=== Suborder: Anisoptera - Dragonflies. ===
A dragonfly is an insect belonging to the order Odonata, suborder Anisoptera (from Greek ἄνισος anisos "uneven" and πτερόν pteron, "wing", because the hindwing is broader than the forewing). Adult dragonflies are characterized by large multifaceted eyes, two pairs of strong transparent wings, sometimes with coloured patches and an elongated body. Dragonflies can be mistaken for the related group, damselflies (Zygoptera), which are similar in structure, though usually lighter in build; however, the wings of most dragonflies are held flat and away from the body, while damselflies hold the wings folded at rest, along or above the abdomen. Dragonflies are agile fliers, while damselflies have a weaker, fluttery flight. Many dragonflies have brilliant iridescent or metallic colours produced by structural coloration, making them conspicuous in flight. An adult dragonfly eye has nearly 24,000 ommatidia.

Dragonflies are predators, both in their aquatic larval stage, when they are known as nymphs or naiads, and as adults. Several years of their lives are spent as nymphs living in fresh water; the adults may be on the wing for just a few days or weeks. They are fast, agile fliers, sometimes migrating across oceans, and are often found near water.

The following 75 Dragonfly species have been documented in Senegal.

==== Family: Aeshnidae - Hawkers ====
Common name	Binomial	Local subspecies	Male	Female
Vagrant Emperor	Anax ephippiger			
emperor	Anax imperator			
Lesser emperor	Anax parthenope			
Black emperor	Anax tristis			
Gynacantha manderica	Gynacantha manderica			

==== Family: Corduliidae - Emeralds ====
Common name	Binomial	Local subspecies	Male	Female
	Idomacromia lieftincki			

==== Family: Gomphidae - Club-tail dragonflies ====
Common name	Binomial	Local subspecies	Male	Female
Western Talontail	Crenigomphus renei			
Fraser's flangetail	Ictinogomphus fraseri			
African fairytail	Lestinogomphus africanus			
Neurogomphus featheri	Neurogomphus featheri			
Lined caspertail	Onychogomphus supinus	xerophilus		
Phyllogomphus aethiops	Phyllogomphus aethiops			
Phyllogomphus occidentalis	Phyllogomphus occidentalis			
Phyllogomphus pseudoccidentalis	Phyllogomphus pseudoccidentalis			

==== Family: Libellulidae - Skimmers ====
Common name	Binomial	Local subspecies	Male	Female
Stout pintail	Acisoma inflatum			
Ivory pintail	Acisoma trifidum			
Orange flasher	Aethiothemis mediofasciata			
Aethiothemis palustris	Aethiothemis palustris			
Aethiothemis solitaria	Aethiothemis solitaria			
Pygmy basker	Aethriamanta rezia			
Northern banded groundling	Brachythemis impartita			
Brachythemis lacustris	Brachythemis lacustris			
Southern banded groundling	Brachythemis leucosticta			
Red rockdweller	Bradinopyga strachani			
Inspector	Chalcostephia flavifrons			
Rock scarlet	Crocothemis divisa			
Scarlet darter	Crocothemis erythraea			
Black percher	Diplacodes lefebvrii			
Hadrothemis defecta	Hadrothemis defecta			
Piedspot	Hemistigma albipunctum			
Slender bottletail	Olpogastra lugubris			
Abbott's skimmer	Orthetrum abbotti			
Orthetrum angustiventre	Orthetrum angustiventre			
Tough skimmer	Orthetrum brachiale			
Epaulet skimmer	Orthetrum chrysostigma			
Orthetrum guineense	Orthetrum guineense			
Orthetrum hintzi	Orthetrum hintzi			
Spectacled skimmer	Orthetrum icteromelas			
Julia skimmer	Orthetrum julia			
Orthetrum monardi	Orthetrum monardi			
Orthetrum stemmale	Orthetrum stemmale			
Long skimmer	Orthetrum trinacria			
Pepperpants	Oxythemis phoenicosceles			
Deceptive widow	Palpopleura deceptor			
Lucia widow	Palpopleura lucia			
Portia widow	Palpopleura portia			
Globe skimmer	Pantala flavescens			
Banded duskdarter	Parazyxomma flavicans			
Black-winged flutterer	Rhyothemis fenestrina			
Phantom flutterer	Rhyothemis semihyalina			
Red-veined darter	Sympetrum fonscolombei			
Tetrathemis camerunensis	Tetrathemis camerunensis			
Black-splashed elf	Tetrathemis polleni			
Coral-tailed cloudwing	Tholymis tillarga			
Keyhole glider	Tramea basilaris			
Ferruginous glider	Tramea limbata			
Halfshade dropwing	Trithemis aconita			
Bronze dropwing	Trithemis aenea			
Violet dropwing	Trithemis annulata			
Red-veined dropwing	Trithemis arteriosa			
Trithemis bifida	Trithemis bifida			
Small dropwing	Trithemis dichroa			
Black dropwing	Trithemis grouti			
Trithemis hecate	Trithemis hecate			
Kalula dropwing	Trithemis kalula			
Kirby's dropwing	Trithemis kirbyi			
Trithemis pruinata	Trithemis pruinata			
Red basker	Urothemis assignata			
Urothemis edwardsii	Urothemis edwardsii			
Zygonyx torridus	Zygonyx torridus			
Zyxomma atlanticum	Zyxomma atlanticum			

==== Family: Lindeniidae - ====
Common name	Binomial	Local subspecies	Male	Female
Ictinogomphus fraseri	Ictinogomphus fraseri			

==== Family: Macromiidae - Cruisers ====
Common name	Binomial	Local subspecies	Male	Female
Phyllomacromia africana	Phyllomacromia africana			
Phyllomacromia contumax	Phyllomacromia contumax			
Phyllomacromia overlaeti	Phyllomacromia overlaeti			

== See also ==
- List of Odonata species of Britain
- List of Odonata species of Ireland
- List of Odonata species of India
- List of Odonata species of South Africa
- List of Odonata species of Taiwan
