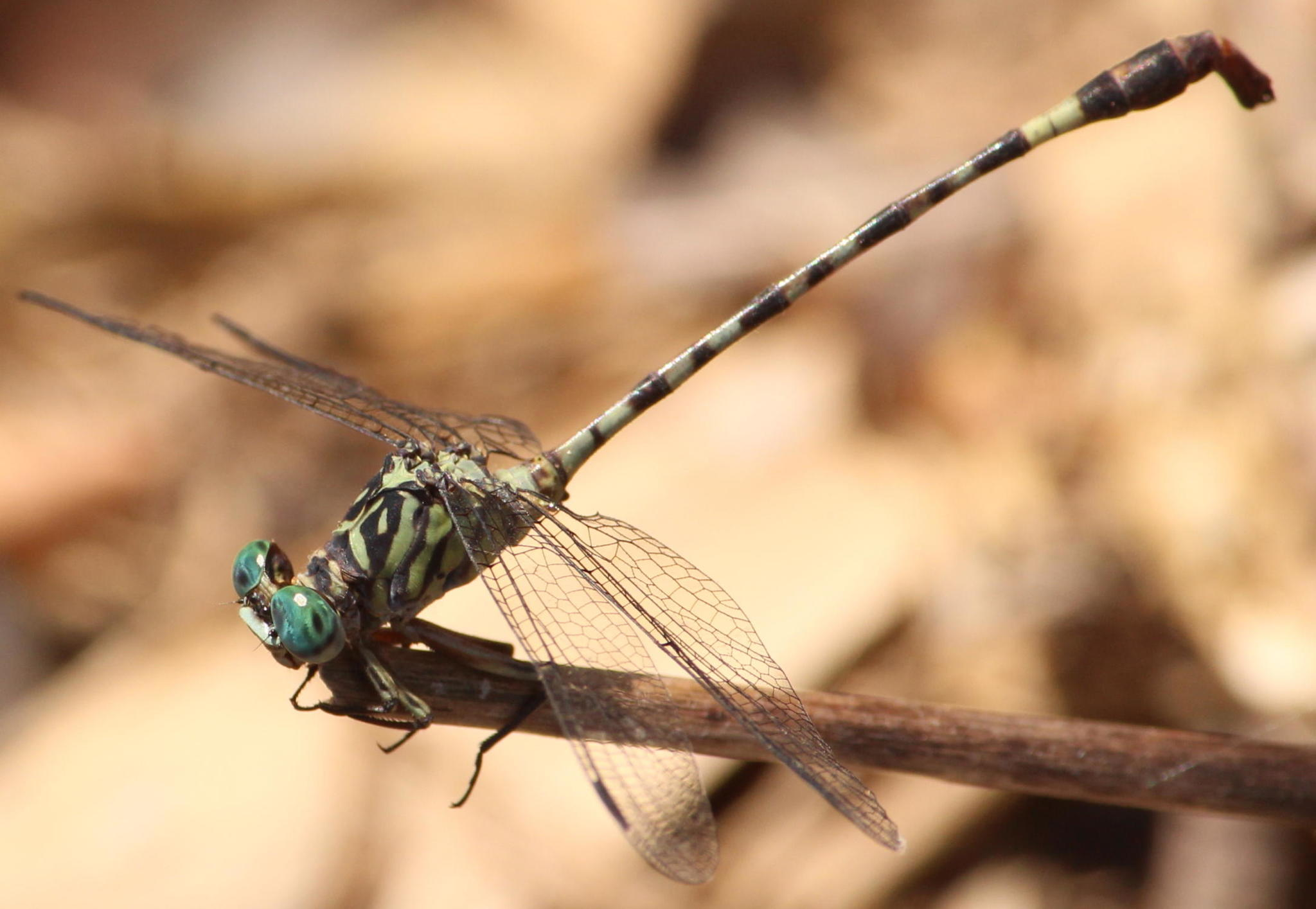

Conservation status
- Least Concern (IUCN 3.1)

Scientific classification
- Kingdom: Animalia
- Phylum: Arthropoda
- Class: Insecta
- Order: Odonata
- Infraorder: Anisoptera
- Family: Gomphidae
- Genus: Lestinogomphus
- Species: L. angustus

Binomial name
- Lestinogomphus angustus Martin, 1911

= Lestinogomphus angustus =

Species of dragonfly

Lestinogomphus angustus, the spined fairytail or common fairytail, is a species of dragonfly in the family Gomphidae.

It is found only in Africa, mostly in the eastern portion, as far north as Kenya where, along with Malawi, Tanzania and Uganda it is widespread, if not common; and all the way south to South Africa, and in several other countries between (Botswana, Cameroon, the Democratic Republic of the Congo, Ivory Coast, Mozambique, Namibia, Sierra Leone, Zambia, Zimbabwe, and possibly Burundi).

Its natural habitats are the freshwater streams and rivers in subtropical or tropical, gallery forestland, or similarly forested, freshwater oases within shrublands. It is threatened by riverine pollution and destruction of its habitat.

Owing to a continued lack of clarity in systematic status, L. africanus has often been confused taxonomically with this species.
