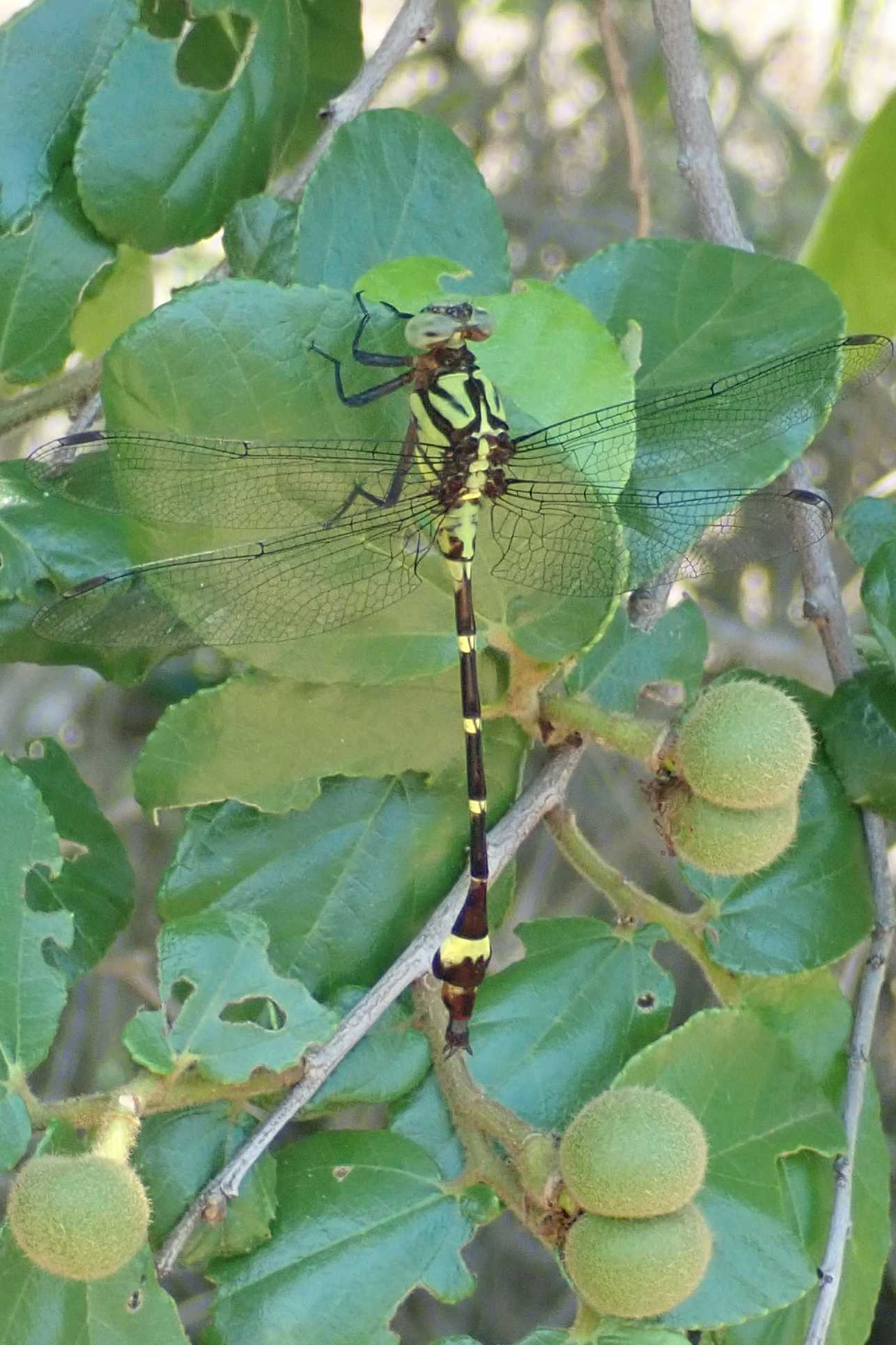
- Neurogomphus zambeziensis

Scientific classification
- Kingdom: Animalia
- Phylum: Arthropoda
- Class: Insecta
- Order: Odonata
- Infraorder: Anisoptera
- Family: Gomphidae
- Genus: Neurogomphus; Karsch, 1890

= Neurogomphus =

Genus of dragonflies

Neurogomphus is a genus of dragonfly in the family Gomphidae. It contains the following species:

- Neurogomphus dissimilis
- Neurogomphus featheri
- Neurogomphus pinheyi
- Neurogomphus zambeziensis
