= Neurogomphus dissimilis =

Conservation status
- Data Deficient (IUCN 3.1)

Scientific classification
- Kingdom: Animalia
- Phylum: Arthropoda
- Class: Insecta
- Order: Odonata
- Infraorder: Anisoptera
- Family: Gomphidae
- Genus: Neurogomphus
- Species: N. dissimilis

Binomial name
- Neurogomphus dissimilis Cammaerts, in press

Species of dragonfly

Neurogomphus dissimilis is a species of dragonfly in the family Gomphidae. It is found in Malawi, Namibia, Zambia, and Zimbabwe. Its natural habitat is rivers.
