= Neurogomphus pinheyi =

Conservation status
- Data Deficient (IUCN 3.1)

Scientific classification
- Kingdom: Animalia
- Phylum: Arthropoda
- Class: Insecta
- Order: Odonata
- Infraorder: Anisoptera
- Family: Gomphidae
- Genus: Neurogomphus
- Species: N. pinheyi

Binomial name
- Neurogomphus pinheyi Cammaerts, 1968

Species of dragonfly

Neurogomphus pinheyi is a species of dragonfly in the family Gomphidae. It is found in Kenya and possibly the Democratic Republic of the Congo. Its natural habitats are subtropical or tropical moist lowland forests and rivers. It is threatened by habitat loss.

== Sources ==
- Clausnitzer, V. (2016). "Mastigogomphus pinheyi". IUCN Red List of Threatened Species. 2016 e.T59924A84316533. doi:10.2305/IUCN.UK.2016-3.RLTS.T59924A84316533.en.
