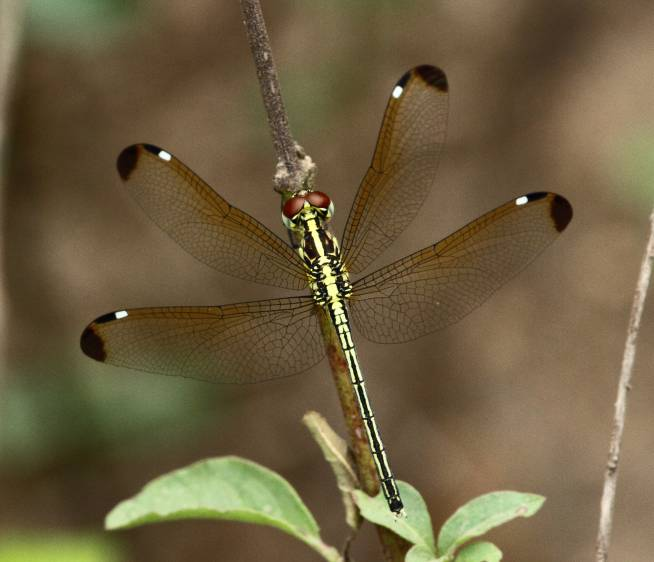
- Hemistigma albipunctum. Female

Scientific classification
- Kingdom: Animalia
- Phylum: Arthropoda
- Class: Insecta
- Order: Odonata
- Infraorder: Anisoptera
- Family: Libellulidae
- Subfamily: Brachydiplacinae
- Genus: Hemistigma; Kirby, 1889

= Hemistigma =

Pied-spots

Genus of dragonflies

Hemistigma is a genus of dragonfly in the family Libellulidae. They are commonly known as pied-spots.

== Species ==
The genus contains only two species:

Male	Female	Scientific name	Common name	Distribution
		Hemistigma affine (Rambur, 1842)		Madagascar
		Hemistigma albipunctum (Rambur, 1842)	pied-spot	widespread in Africa
