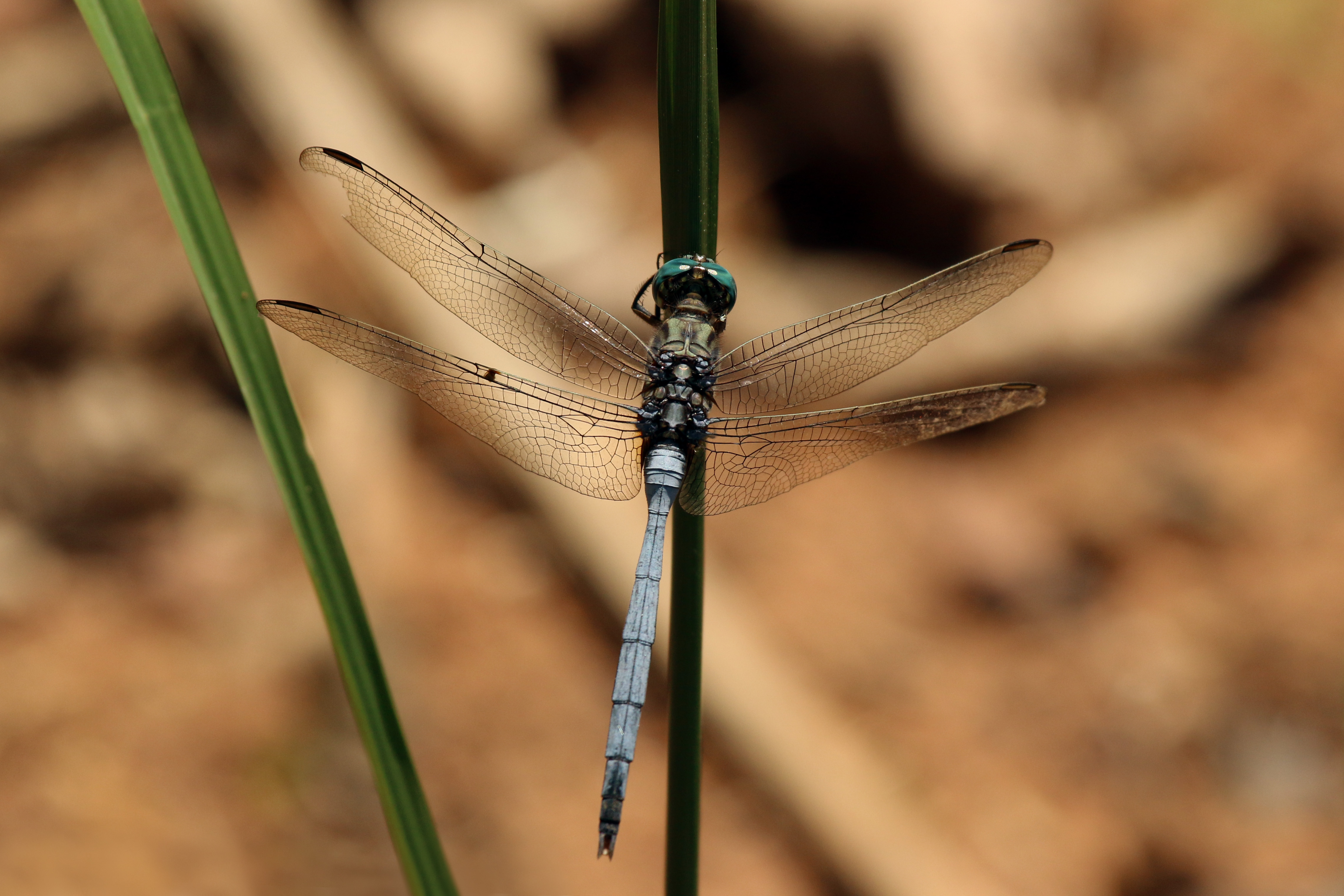
- Male, uMkhuze Game Reserve, KwaZulu Natal, South Africa
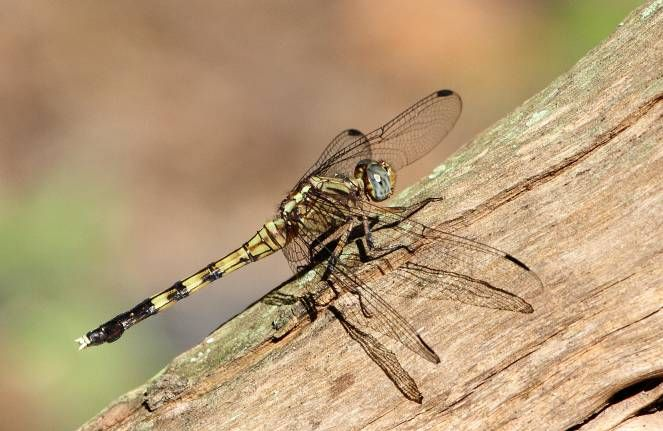
- Female, Ithala Game Reserve, KwaZulu Natal, South Africa

Conservation status
- Least Concern (IUCN 3.1)

Scientific classification
- Kingdom: Animalia
- Phylum: Arthropoda
- Clade: Pancrustacea
- Class: Insecta
- Order: Odonata
- Suborder: Anisoptera
- Superfamily: Libelluloidea
- Family: Libellulidae
- Genus: Orthetrum
- Species: O. julia

Binomial name
- Orthetrum julia Kirby, 1900

= Orthetrum julia =

Species of dragonfly

Orthetrum julia, the Julia skimmer, is a species of dragonfly in the family Libellulidae.

== Distribution and status ==
It is found in Angola, Benin, Burkina Faso, Cameroon, Central African Republic, the Republic of the Congo, the Democratic Republic of the Congo, Ivory Coast, Equatorial Guinea, Ethiopia, Gabon, Gambia, Ghana, Guinea, Kenya, Liberia, Malawi, Mozambique, Namibia, Nigeria, São Tomé and Príncipe, Senegal, Sierra Leone, South Africa, Sudan, Tanzania, Togo, Uganda, Zambia, Zimbabwe, possibly Burundi, and possibly Madagascar.

O. j. falsum mating

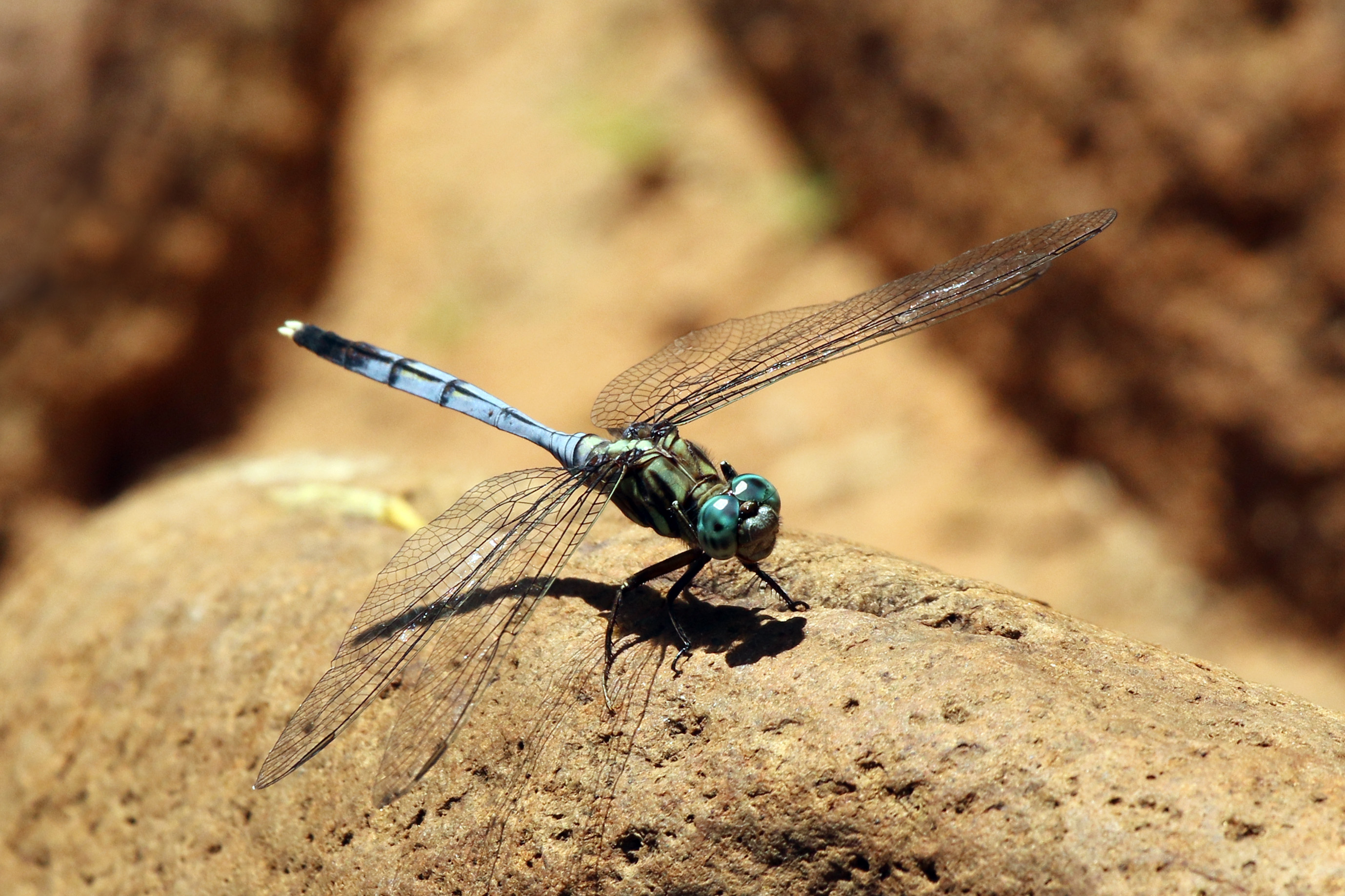
Immature male

== Habitat ==
Its natural habitats are subtropical or tropical moist lowland forests, rivers, and freshwater springs.

== Similar species ==
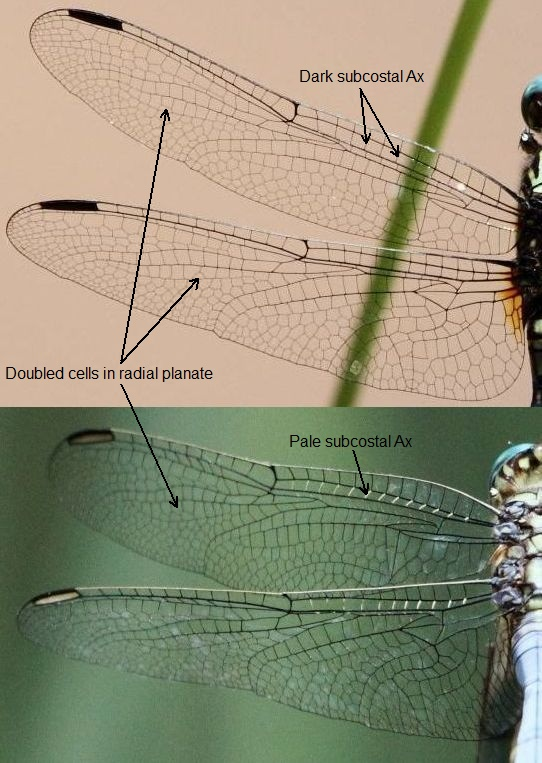
Wing detail of O. julia falsum (top) and O. stemmale

Orthetrum stemmale appears similar to O. julia falsum in south-eastern Africa. The important differences are in wing details shown in the figure (left). O. julia falsum (top) has dark subcostal Ax and has one row of cells in the radial planate (generally less than 10 cells doubled - summed over the radial planates of the four wings). This example shows a single doubled cell on each wing. O. stemmale (bottom) has pale subcostal Ax and usually at least ten cells doubled in total over the four wings - this example shows three doubled cells in the radial planate of the forewing. The pterostigma of O. julia falsum is generally dark, whereas that of O. stemmale is pale.
