= Parazyxomma =

Scientific classification
- Kingdom: Animalia
- Phylum: Arthropoda
- Class: Insecta
- Order: Odonata
- Infraorder: Anisoptera
- Family: Libellulidae
- Genus: Parazyxomma; Pinhey, 1961

Genus of dragonflies

Parazyxomma is a genus of dragonfly in the family Libellulidae. It contains only one species, Parazyxomma flavicans (Martin, 1908) - the Banded Duskdarter. It is widespread and common in much of west Africa and central Africa.
