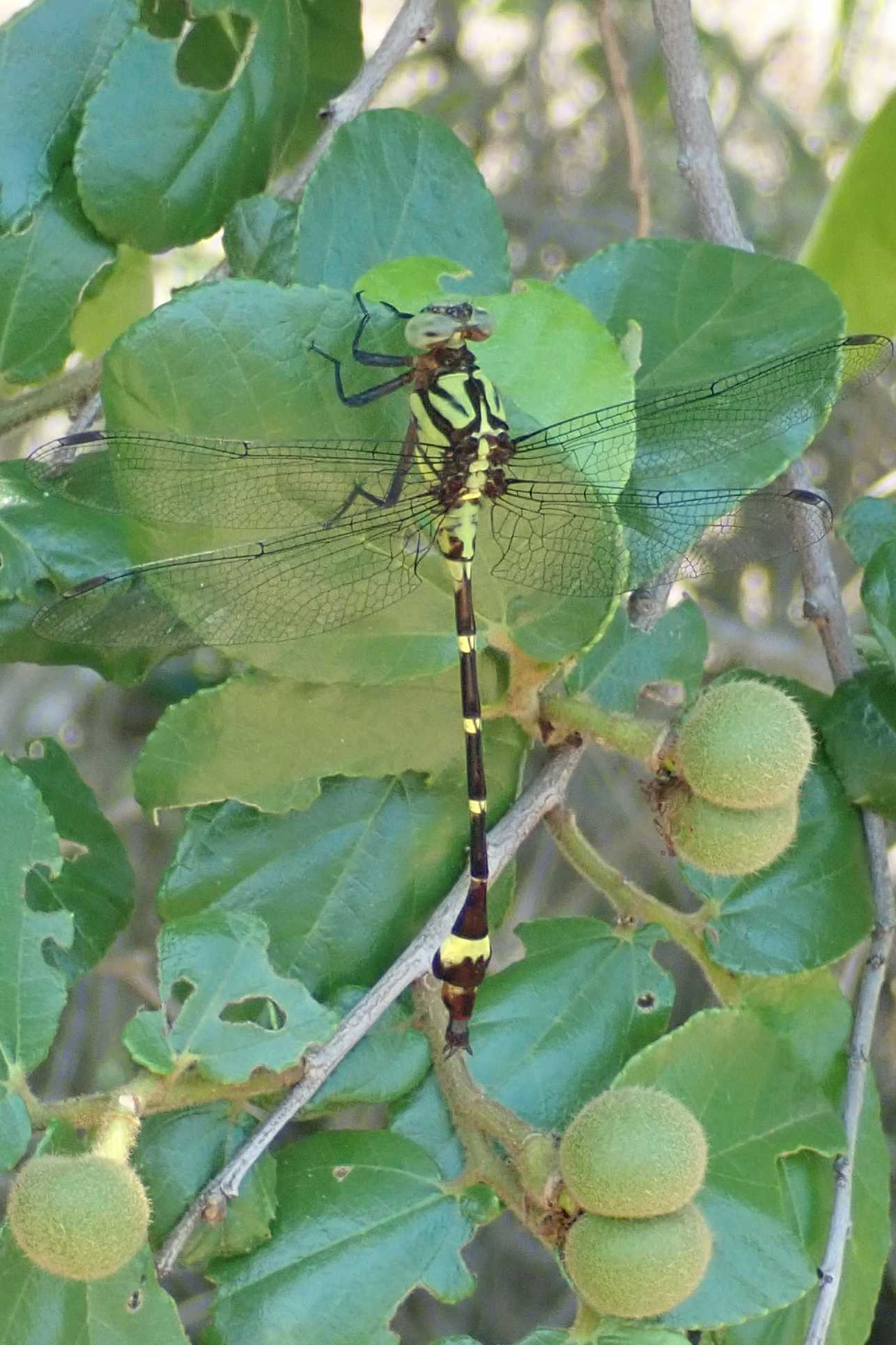

Conservation status
- Least Concern (IUCN 3.1)

Scientific classification
- Kingdom: Animalia
- Phylum: Arthropoda
- Class: Insecta
- Order: Odonata
- Infraorder: Anisoptera
- Family: Gomphidae
- Genus: Neurogomphus
- Species: N. zambeziensis

Binomial name
- Neurogomphus zambeziensis Cammaerts, 2004

= Neurogomphus zambeziensis =

Species of dragonfly

Neurogomphus zambeziensis is a species of dragonfly in the family Gomphidae. It is found in Botswana, Mozambique, Namibia, South Africa, Zambia, Zimbabwe, and possibly Tanzania. Its natural habitats are subtropical or tropical moist lowland forests, subtropical or tropical dry shrubland, subtropical or tropical moist shrubland, and rivers.
