= Parazyxomma flavicans =

Conservation status
- Least Concern (IUCN 3.1)

Scientific classification
- Kingdom: Animalia
- Phylum: Arthropoda
- Class: Insecta
- Order: Odonata
- Infraorder: Anisoptera
- Family: Libellulidae
- Genus: Parazyxomma
- Species: P. flavicans

Binomial name
- Parazyxomma flavicans (Martin, 1908)

Synonyms
- Brachythemis liberiensis Fraser, 1949

Species of dragonfly

Parazyxomma flavicans, the banded duskdarter, is a monophyletic species of dragonfly in the family Libellulidae. It is found in Benin, Botswana, Cameroon, the Democratic Republic of the Congo, Ivory Coast, Gabon, Gambia, Ghana, Guinea, Guinea-Bissau, Liberia, Malawi, Namibia, Nigeria, Senegal, South Africa, Uganda, Zambia, and Zimbabwe. Its natural habitats are swamps, freshwater lakes, intermittent freshwater lakes, freshwater marshes, and intermittent freshwater marshes.

== Other ==
- Martin Schorr; Martin Lindeboom; Dennis Paulson. "World Odonata List". University of Puget Sound.
