= Neurogomphus featheri =

Conservation status
- Least Concern (IUCN 3.1)

Scientific classification
- Kingdom: Animalia
- Phylum: Arthropoda
- Class: Insecta
- Order: Odonata
- Infraorder: Anisoptera
- Family: Gomphidae
- Genus: Neurogomphus
- Species: N. featheri

Binomial name
- Neurogomphus featheri Pinhey, 1967

Species of dragonfly

Neurogomphus featheri is a species of dragonfly in the family Gomphidae. It is found in Chad, Gambia, Kenya, Nigeria, and Uganda. Its natural habitats are subtropical or tropical moist lowland forests, moist savanna, subtropical or tropical dry shrubland, subtropical or tropical moist shrubland, and rivers.
