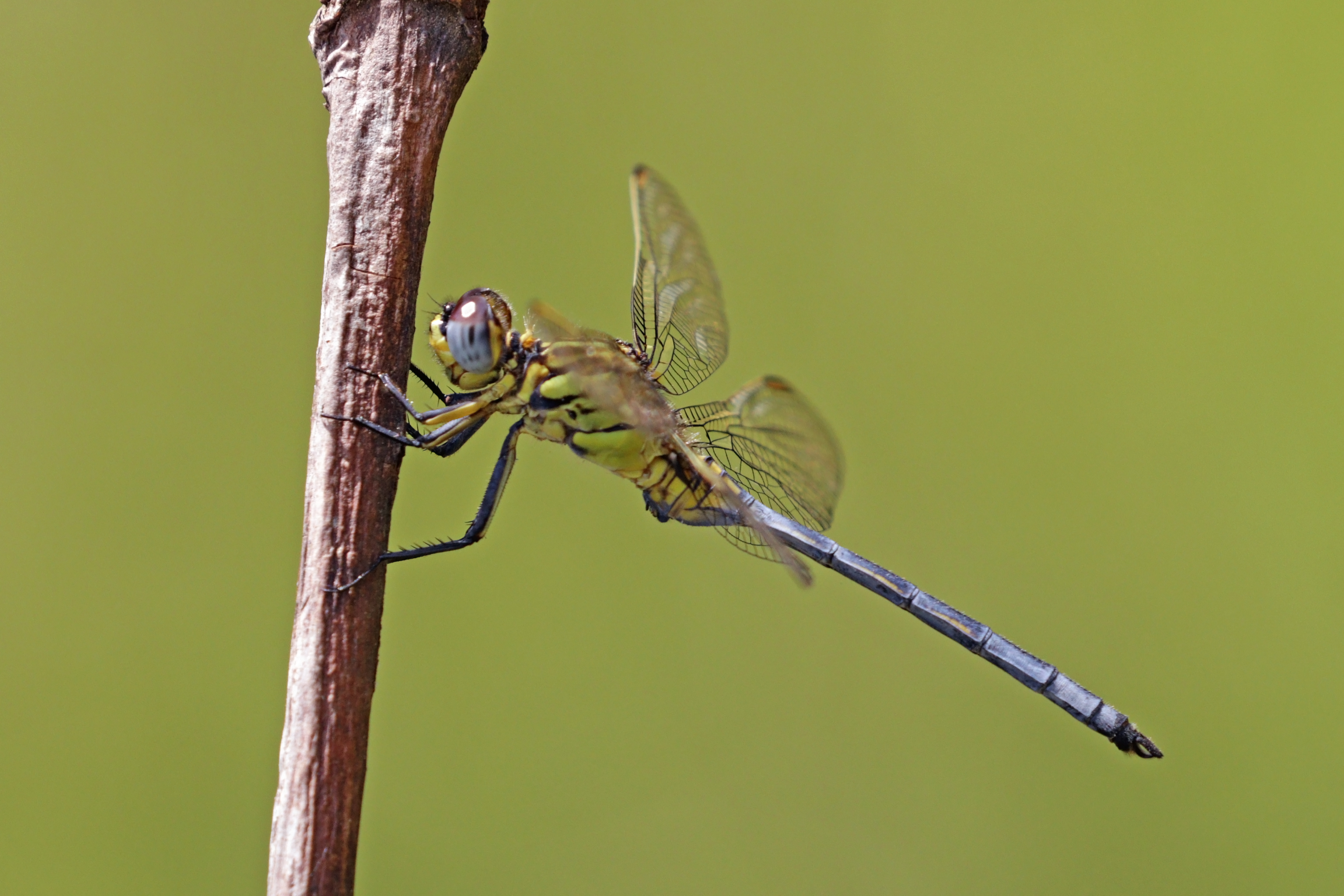
- male

Conservation status
- Least Concern (IUCN 3.1)

Scientific classification
- Kingdom: Animalia
- Phylum: Arthropoda
- Clade: Pancrustacea
- Class: Insecta
- Order: Odonata
- Infraorder: Anisoptera
- Family: Libellulidae
- Genus: Orthetrum
- Species: O. icteromelas

Binomial name
- Orthetrum icteromelas Ris, 1910

= Orthetrum icteromelas =

Species of dragonfly

Orthetrum icteromelas, the spectacled skimmer is a species of dragonfly in the family Libellulidae. It is found in Angola, Botswana, Cameroon, Chad, the Democratic Republic of the Congo, Ivory Coast, Gambia, Ghana, Guinea, Kenya, Madagascar, Malawi, Mauritius, Mozambique, Namibia, Nigeria, Sierra Leone, South Africa, Sudan, Tanzania, Togo, Uganda, Zambia, Zimbabwe, and possibly Burundi. Its natural habitats are subtropical or tropical moist lowland forests, subtropical or tropical dry shrubland, subtropical or tropical moist shrubland, and rivers.

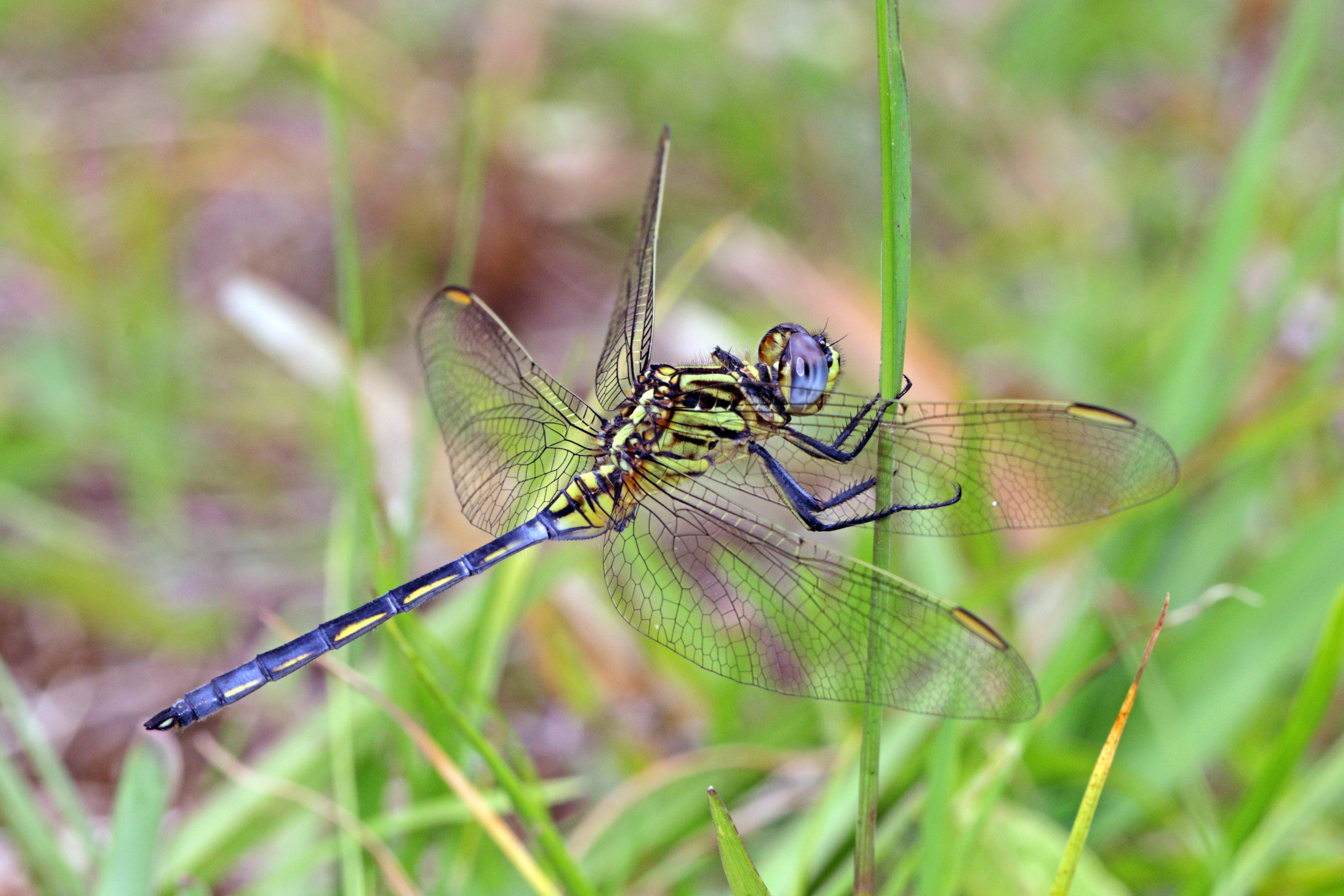
immature male

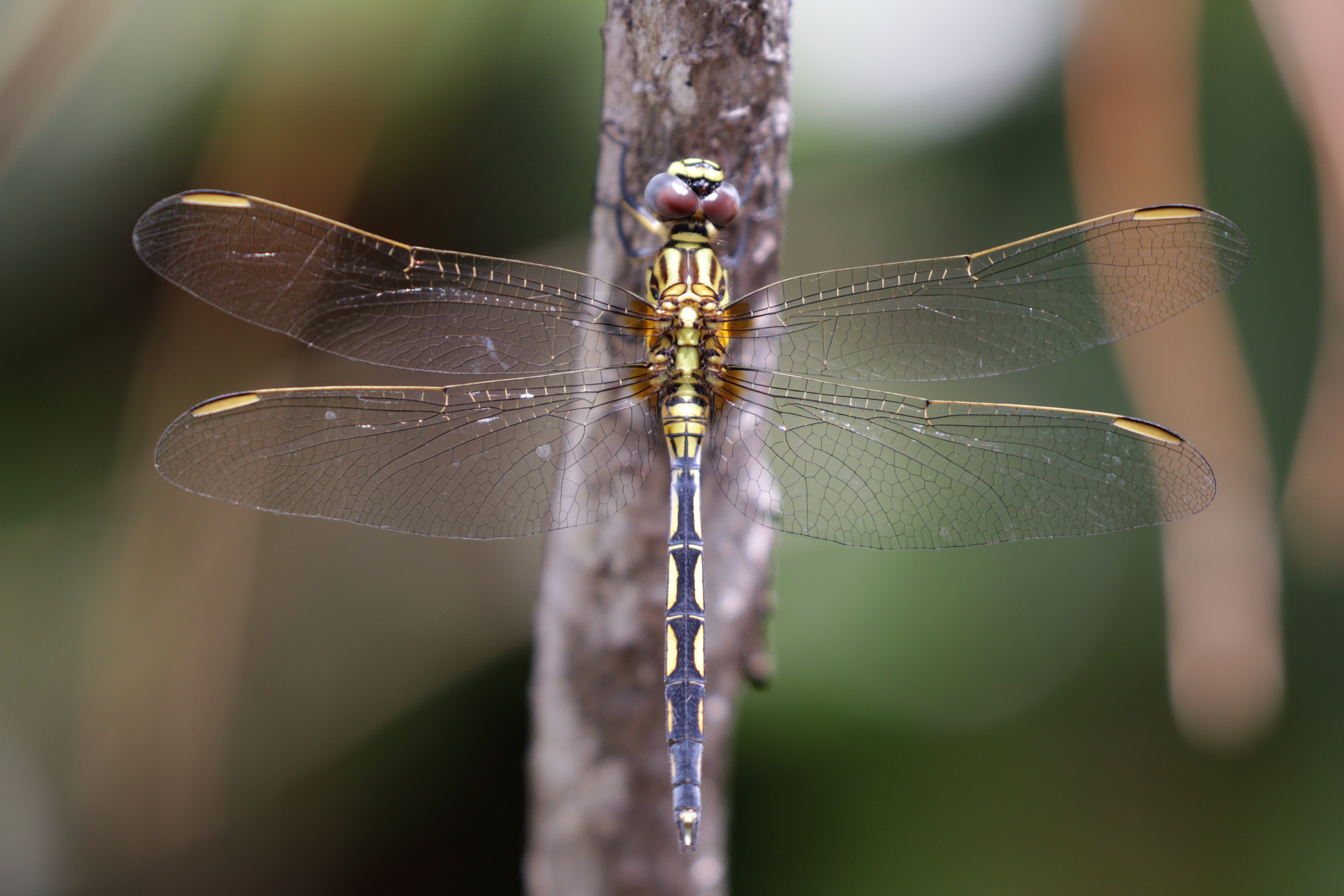
immature male

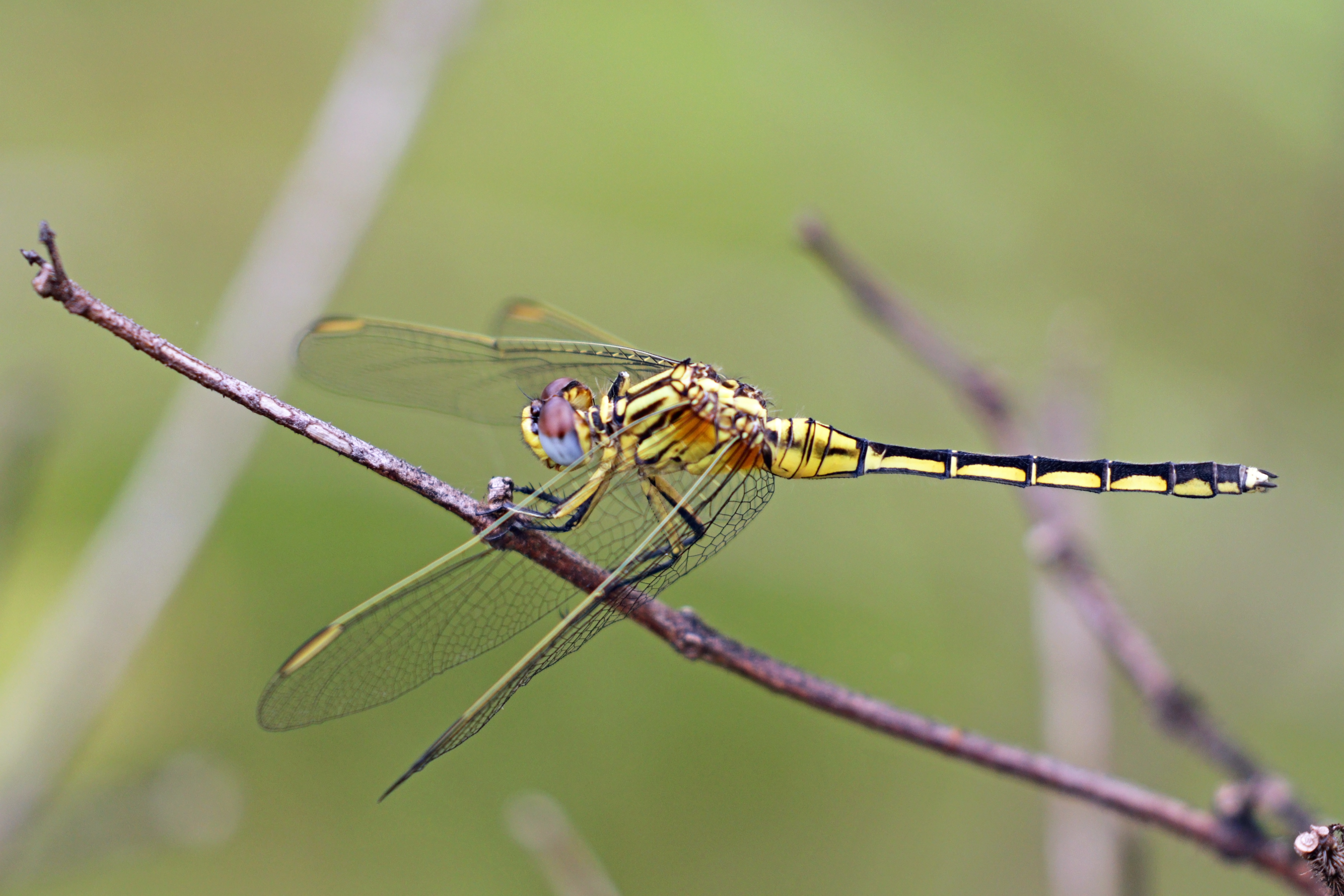
female

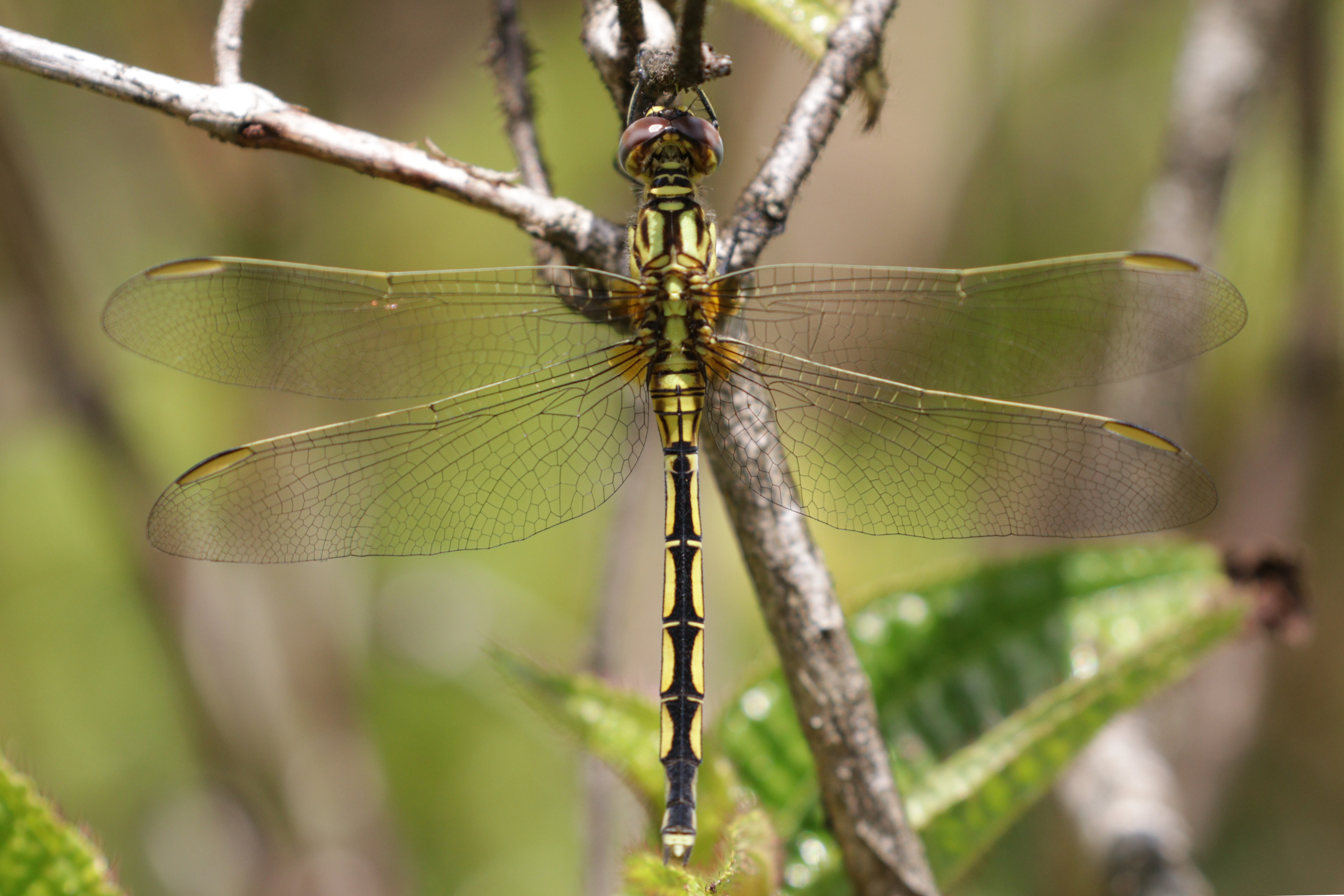
female

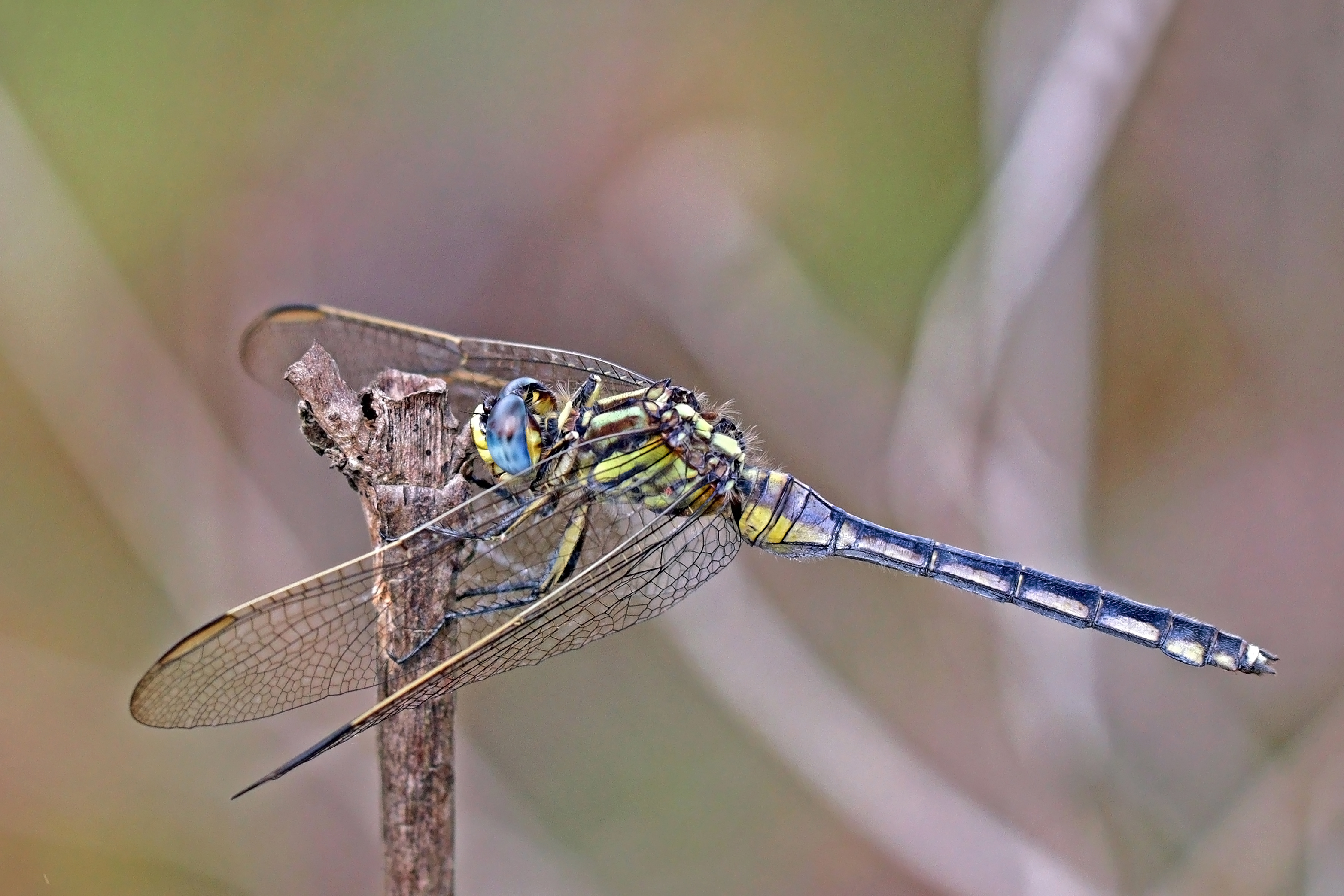
mature female

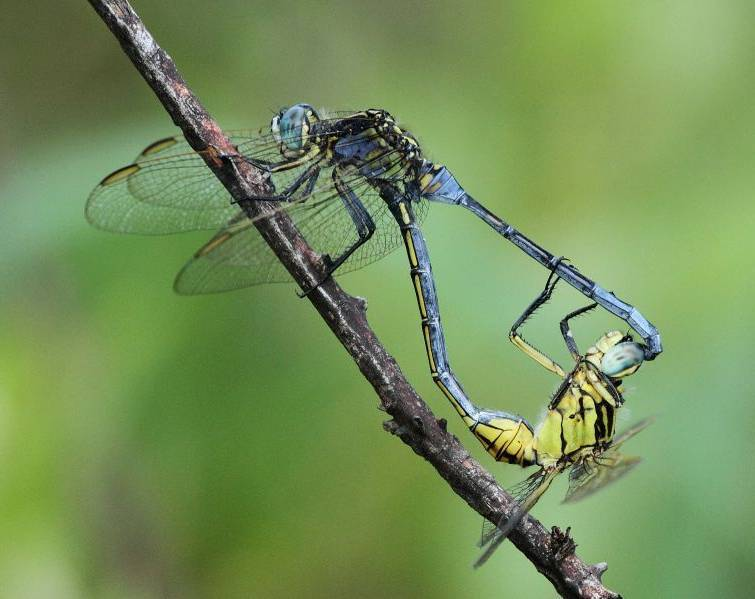
mating pair
