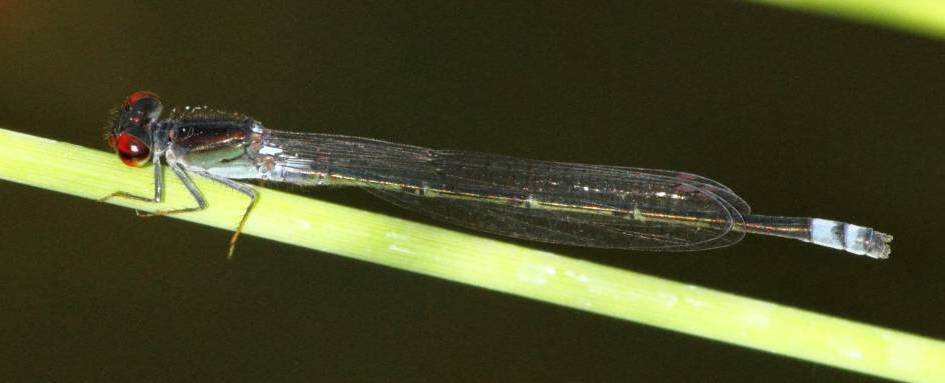
- Male

Conservation status
- Least Concern (IUCN 3.1)

Scientific classification
- Kingdom: Animalia
- Phylum: Arthropoda
- Clade: Pancrustacea
- Class: Insecta
- Order: Odonata
- Suborder: Zygoptera
- Family: Coenagrionidae
- Genus: Pseudagrion
- Species: P. hamoni

Binomial name
- Pseudagrion hamoni Fraser, 1955

= Pseudagrion hamoni =

Swarthy sprite

Species of damselfly

Pseudagrion hamoni, the swarthy sprite, is a species of damselfly in the family Coenagrionidae.

== Distribution and status ==
This sprite has a pan-African distribution, and is also found in Yemen and Saudi Arabia. The species currently has no major global threats. Populations in some desert localities in North Africa are isolated from more secure populations further south.

== Habitat ==
Its natural habitats include ponds, streams and rivers in savanna and bush. In the arid northern parts of its range, it is found in wadis and gueltas.

== Gallery ==
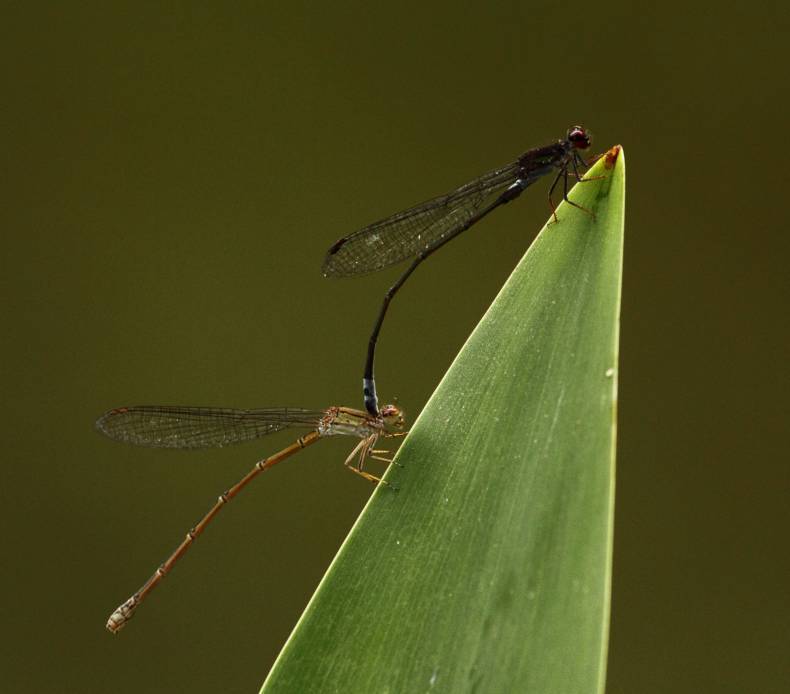
Pair in tandem

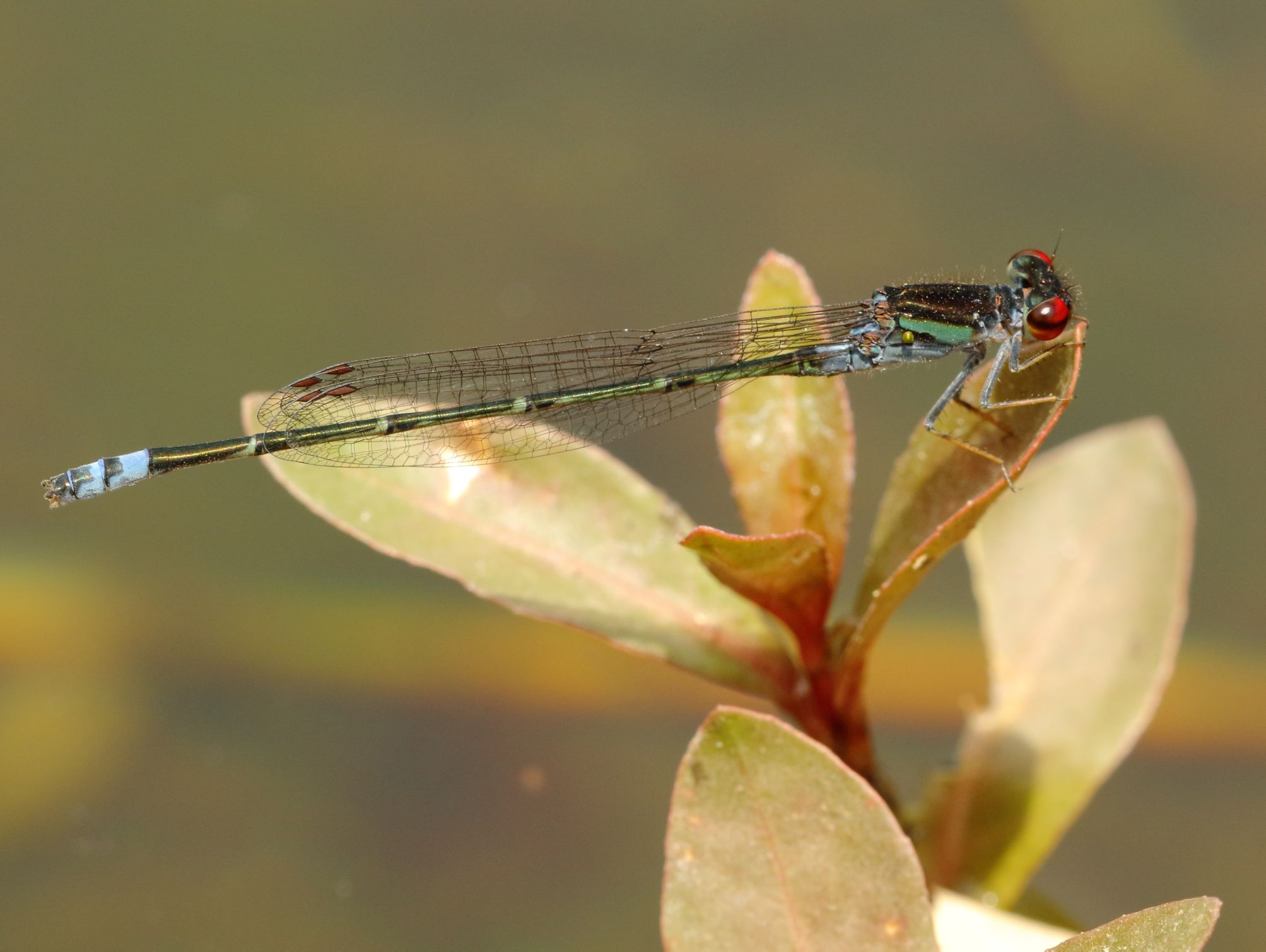
Male

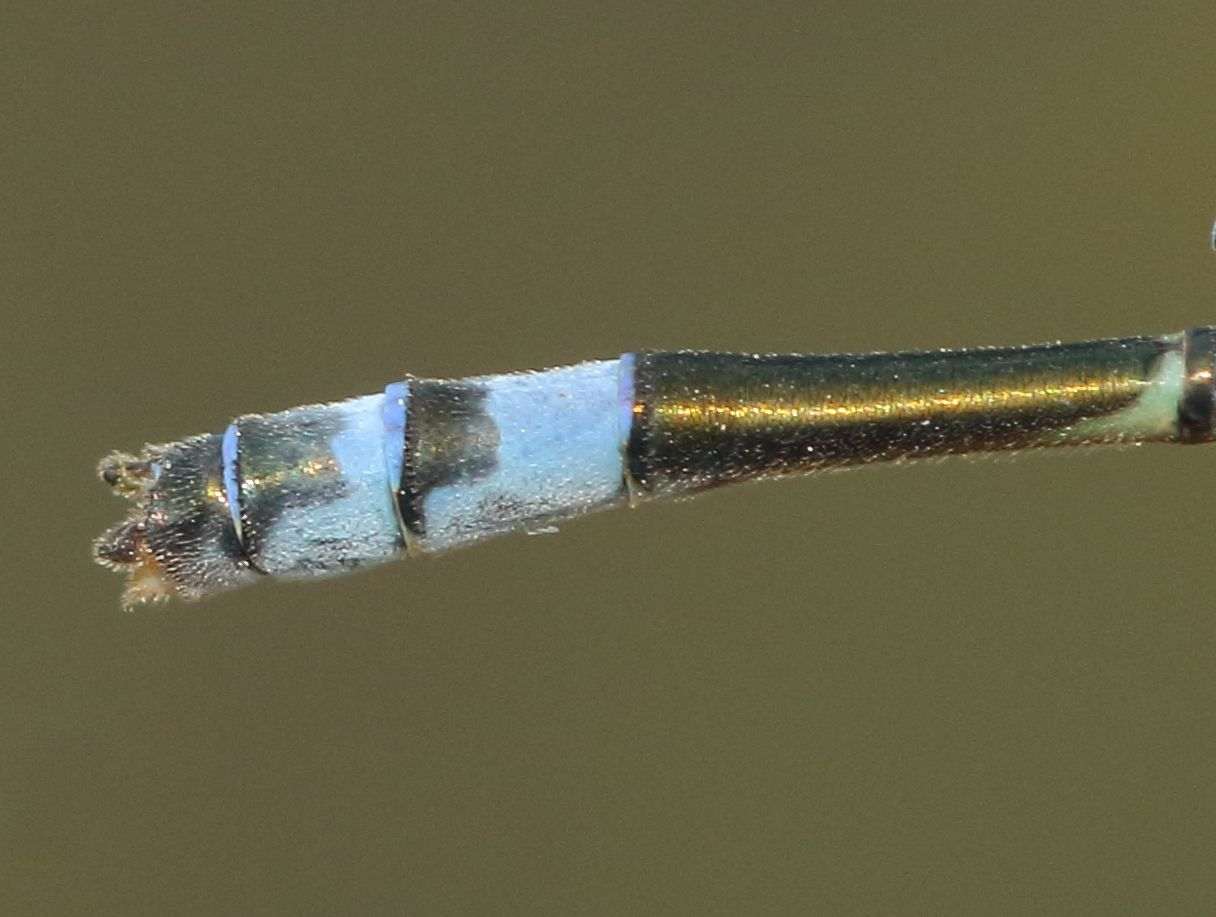
Male abdomen; segments 7-10
