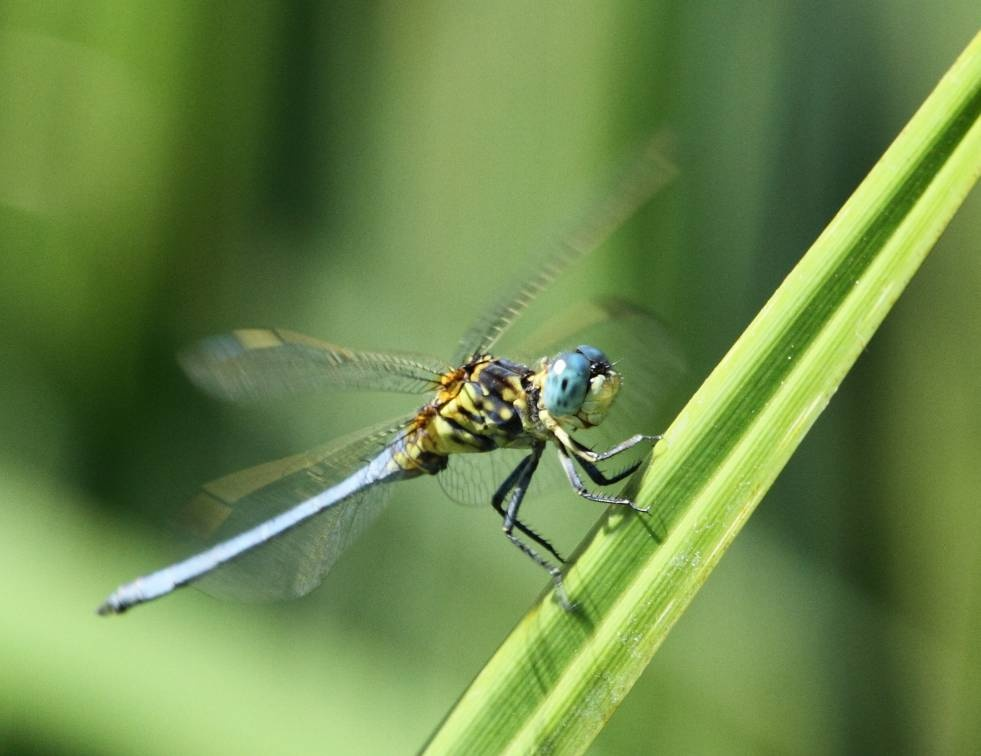
- Male

Conservation status
- Least Concern (IUCN 3.1)

Scientific classification
- Kingdom: Animalia
- Phylum: Arthropoda
- Clade: Pancrustacea
- Class: Insecta
- Order: Odonata
- Infraorder: Anisoptera
- Family: Libellulidae
- Genus: Orthetrum
- Species: O. abbotti

Binomial name
- Orthetrum abbotti Calvert, 1892

Synonyms
- Chlorocnemis inepta (Grünberg, 1902); Orthetrum flavidulum (Kirby, 1898); Orthetrum mundulum (Morton, 1928); Orthetrum phillipsi (Kirby, 1896); Oxythemis villiersi (Fraser, 1949)

= Orthetrum abbotti =

Species of dragonfly

Orthetrum abbotti is a species of dragonfly in the family Libellulidae. Common names include little skimmer and Abbott's skimmer.

The species is found in most countries in sub-Saharan Africa, and also Jordan and Yemen. Its preferred habitats are small marshy spots (such as seeps, marshy verges of streams and grassy puddles) in grasslands and savannas.

This is a small Orthetrum; length 33–38 mm, wingspan 52–60 mm. Mature males are pale blue and the crest of the frons may be dark. The hook of the hamule is long and thin. Females and teneral males have only thin dark lines on the thorax.

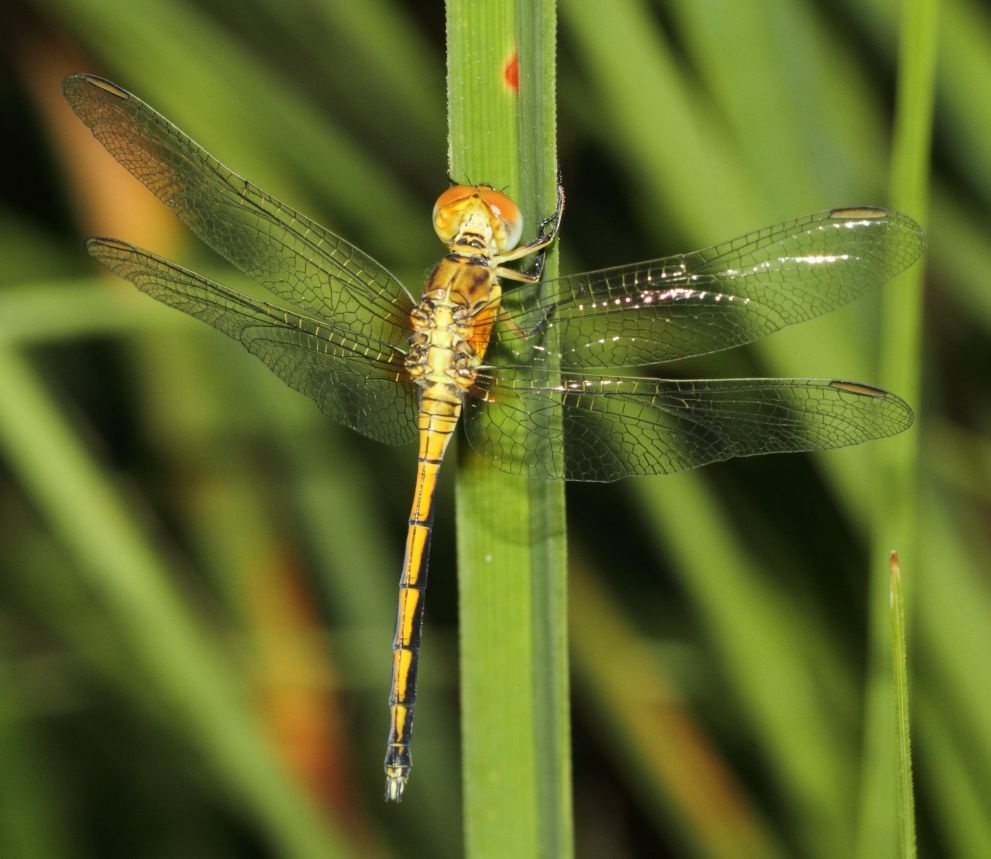
Recently emerged male

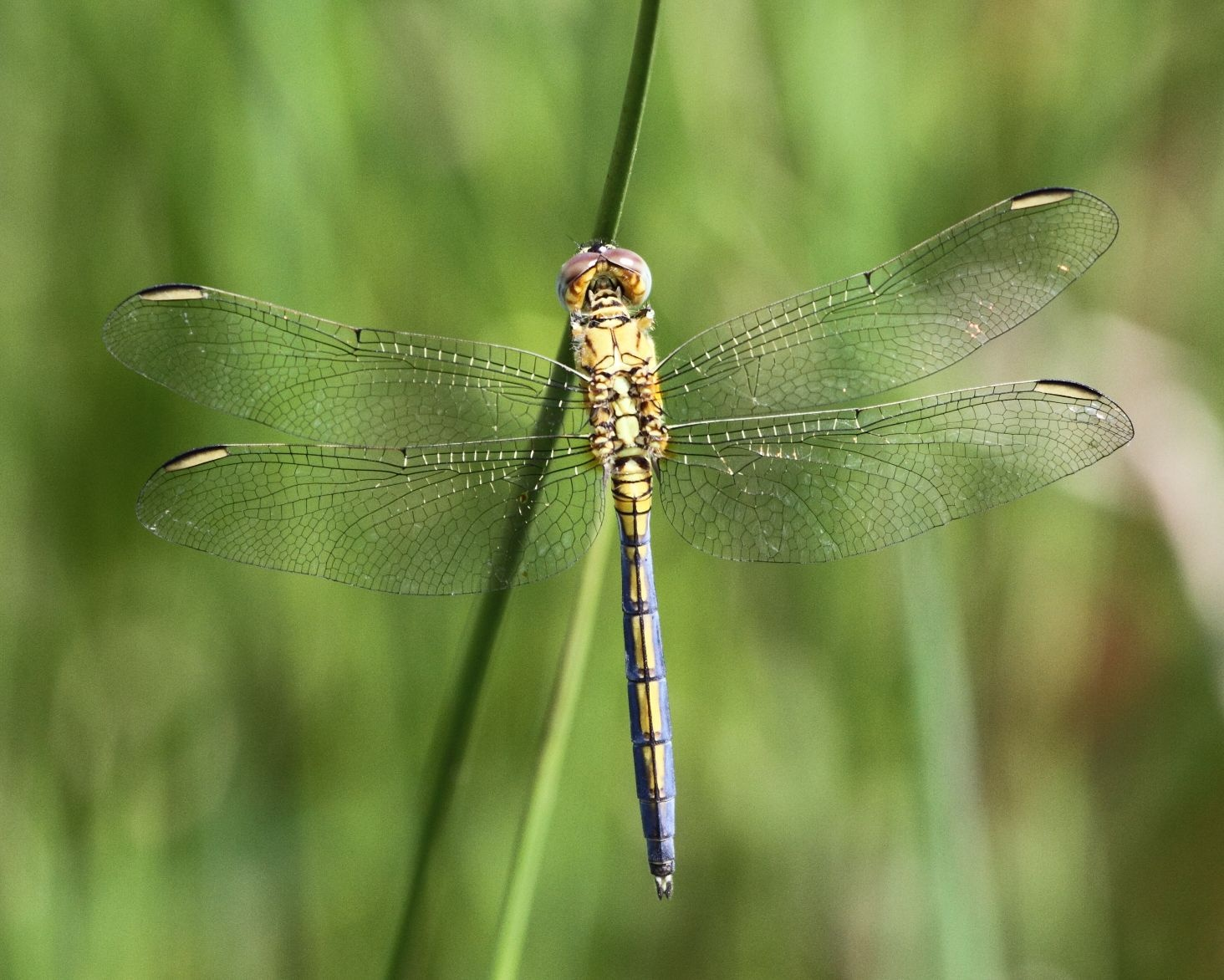
Immature male

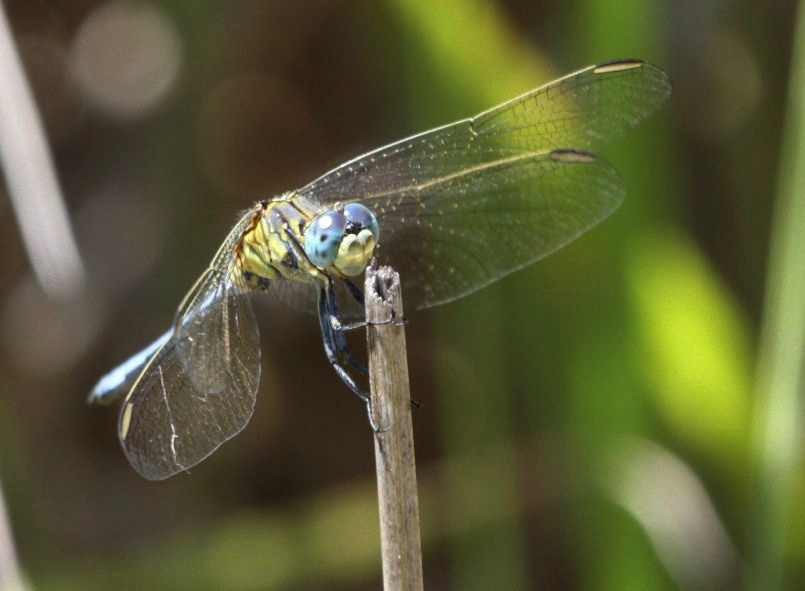
Immature male

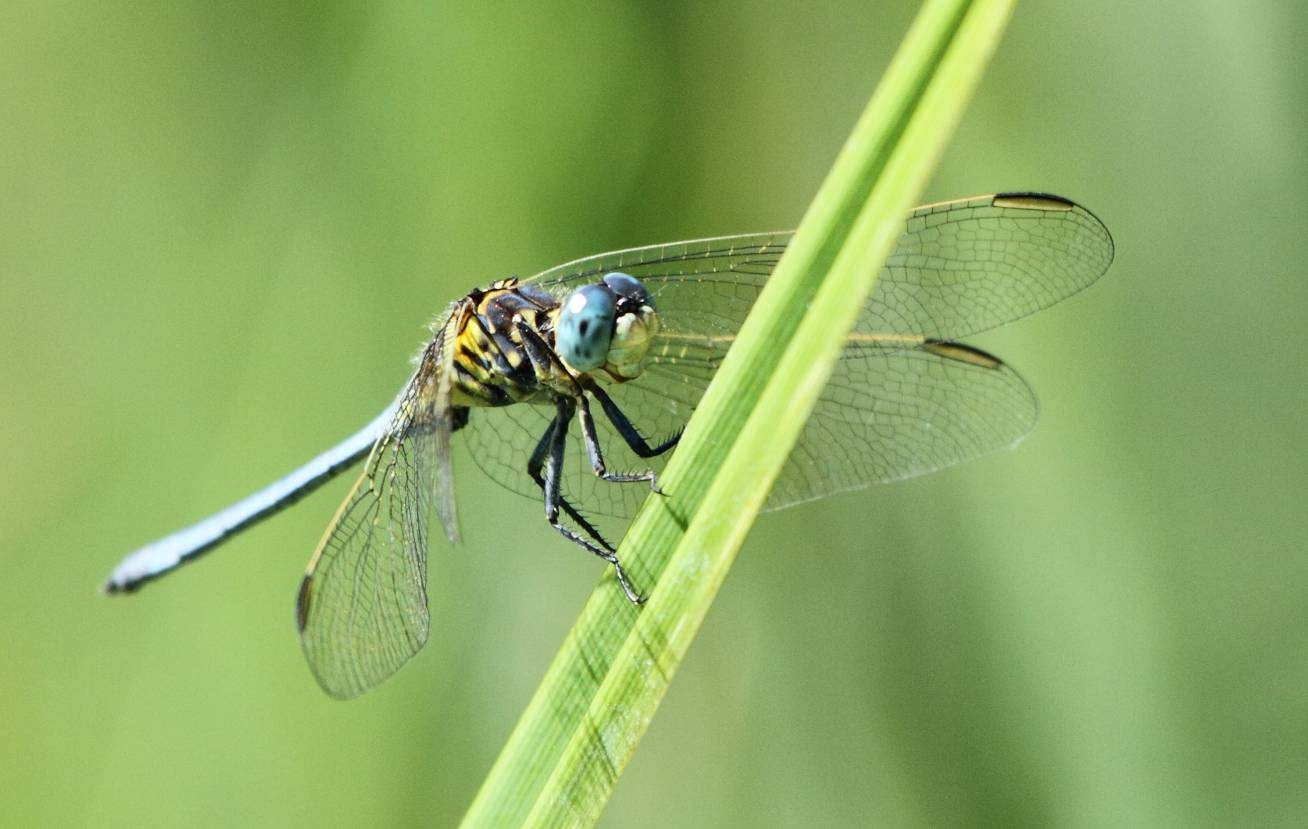
Immature male

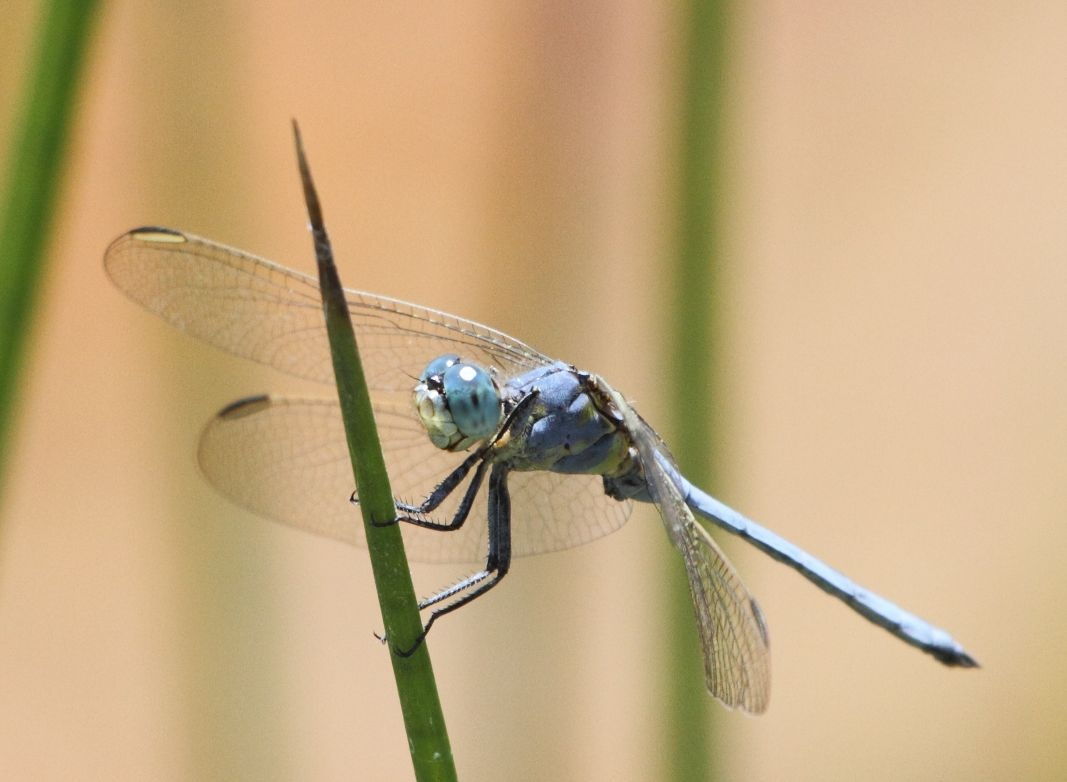
Mature male

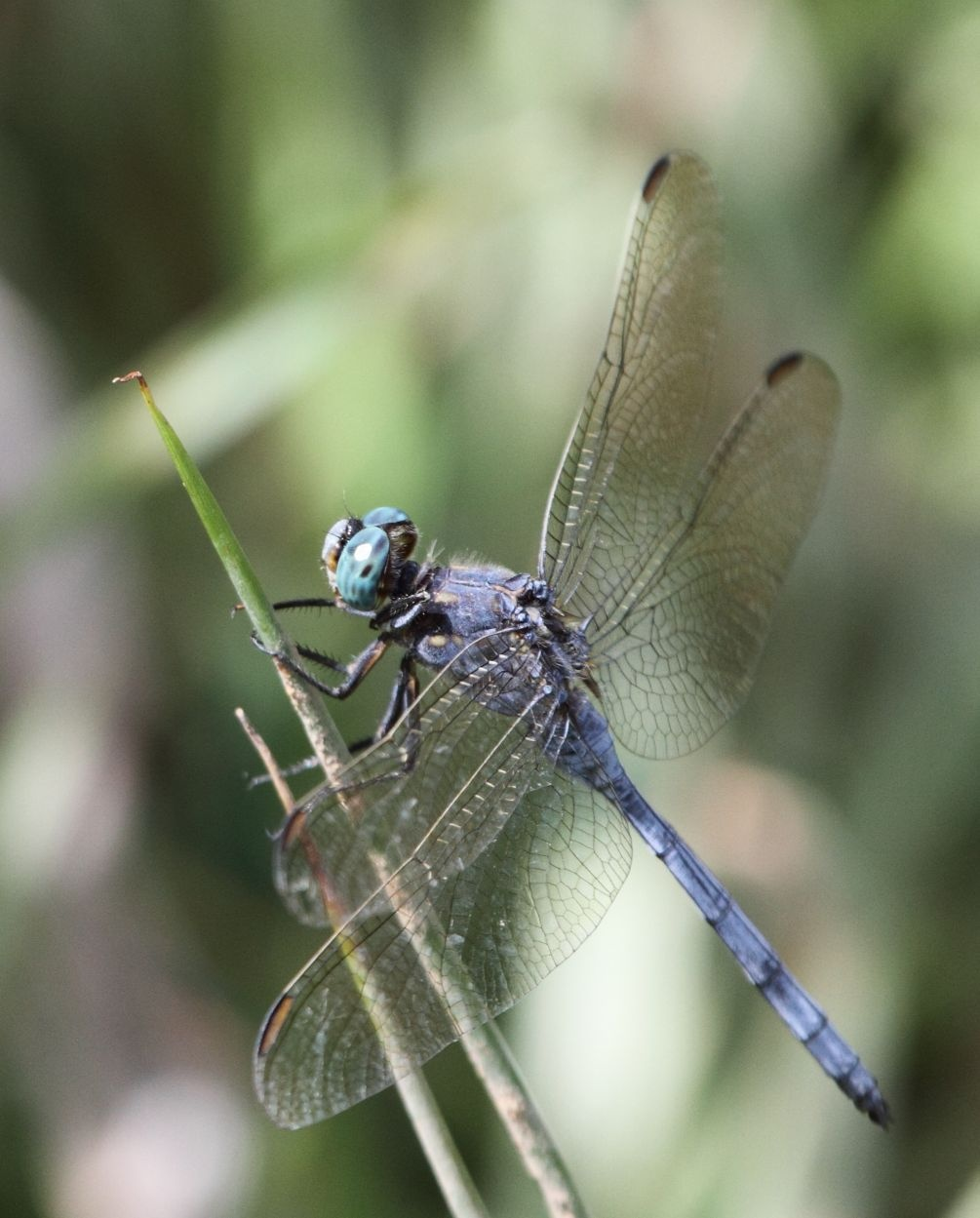
Old male

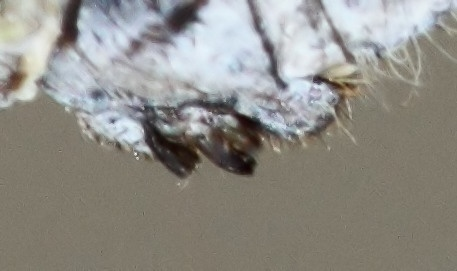
Male secondary gentilia

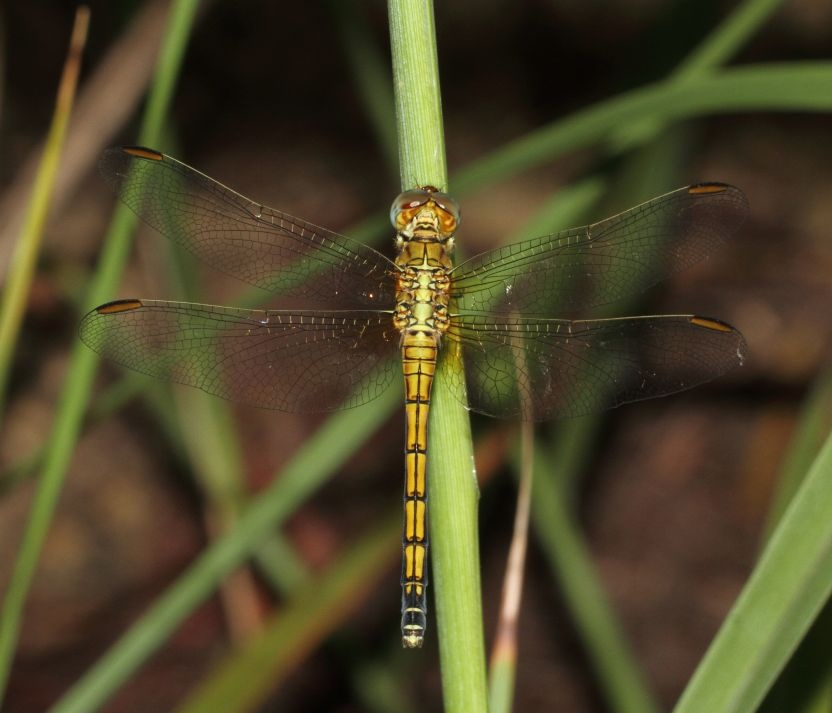
Female

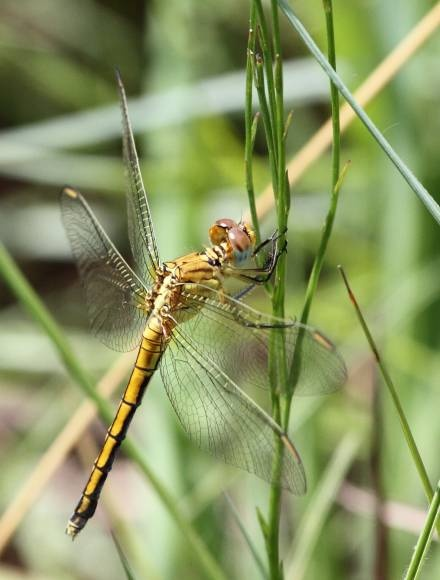
Female

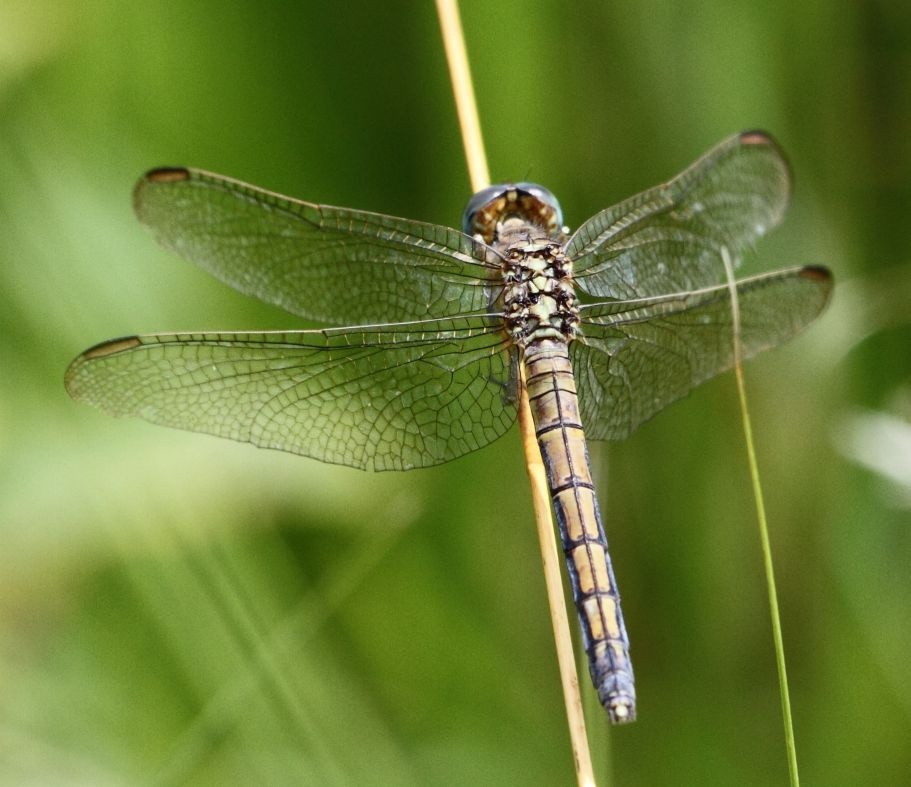
Old female

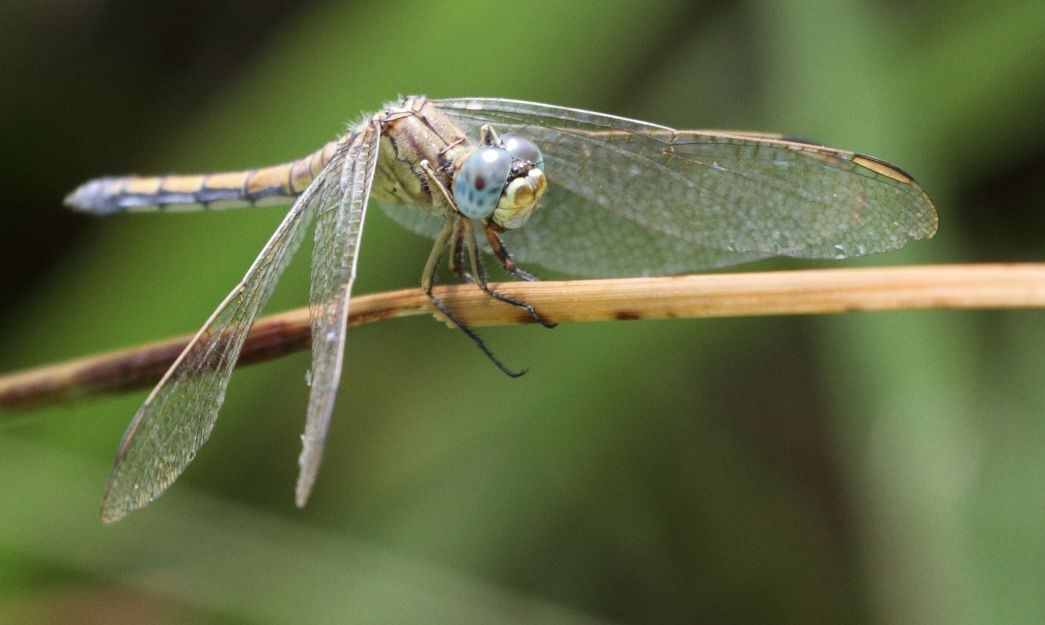
Old female
