= List of Odonata species of Taiwan =

The following is a list of Odonata species found in Taiwan. The total number of species, with damselflies and dragonflies, recorded is 156, within including 14 endemic species and 10 endemic subspecies.

== Anisoptera ==
=== Aeshnidae ===
==== Aeshna ====
- Aeshna petalura taiyal Asahina, 1938 ※endemic subspecies

==== Anaciaeschna ====
- Anaciaeschna jaspidea (Burmeister, 1839)
- Anaciaeschna martini Selys, 1897

==== Anax ====
- Anax guttatus (Burmeister, 1839)
- Anax nigrofasciatus nigrofasciatus Oguma, 1915
- Anax panybeus Hagen, 1867
- Anax parthenope julius Brauer, 1865

==== Cephaleschna ====
- Cephalaeschna risi Asahina, 1981

==== Gynacantha ====
- Gynacantha bayadera Selys, 1891
- Gynacantha hyalina Selys, 1882
- Gynacantha japonica Bartenef, 1909
- Gynacantha ryukyuensis Asahina, 1962
- Gynacantha saltatrix Martin, 1909

==== Periaeschna magdalena ====
- Periaeschna magdalena Martin, 1909

==== Planaeschna ====
- Planaeschna ishigakiana flavostria Yeh, 1996 ※endemic subspecies
- Planaeschna risi risi Asahina, 1964
- Planaeschna taiwana Asahina, 1951 ※endemic species

==== Polycanthagyna ====
- Polycanthagyna erythromelas (McLachlan, 1896)
- Polycanthagyna melanictera (Selys, 1883)
- Polycanthagyna ornithocephala (McLachlan, 1896)

==== Sarasaeschna ====
- Sarasaeschna lieni (Yeh et Chen, 2000) ※endemic species
- Sarasaeschna pyanan (Asahina, 1915) ※endemic species
- Sarasaeschna tsaopiensis (Yeh et Chen, 2000) ※endemic species

=== Gomphidae ===
==== Anisogomphus ====
- Anisogomphus koxingai Chao, 1954
- Anisogomphus maacki (Selys, 1872)

==== Asiagomphus ====
- Asiagomphus hainanensis (Chao, 1953)
- Asiagomphus pacificus (Chao, 1953)
- Asiagomphus perlaetus (Chao, 1953)
- Asiagomphus septimus (Needham, 1930)

==== Bumagomphus ====
- Bumagomphus vermicularis (Matin, 1904)

==== Fukienogomphus ====
- Fukienogomphus prometheus (Lieftinck, 1939)

==== Gomphidia ====
- Gomphidia confluens Selys, 1878
- Gomphidia kruegeri fukienensis Chao, 1955

==== Heliogomphus ====
- Heliogomphus retroflexus (Ris, 1912)

==== Ictinogomphus ====
- Ictinogomphus rapax (Rambur, 1842)

==== Lamelligomphus ====
- Lamelligomphus formosanus (Matsumursa, 1926)

==== Leptogomphus ====
- Leptogomphus sauteri Ris, 1912
  - L. s. formosanus Matsumura, 1926 ※endemic species
  - L. s. sauteri Ris, 1912 ※endemic species

==== Merogomphus ====
- Merogomphus paviei Martin, 1904

==== Sieboldius ====
- Sieboldius deflexus (Chao, 1955)

==== Sinictinogomphus ====
- Sinictinogomphus clavatus (Fabricius, 1775)

==== Sinogomphus ====
- Sinogomphus formosanus Asahina, 1951 ※endemic species

==== Stylogomphus ====
- Stylogomphus change Asahina, 1968 ※endemic species
- Stylogomphus shirozui shirozui Asahina, 1966 ※endemic species

==== Stylurus ====
- Stylurus takashii (Asahina, 1966) ※endemic species

=== Cordulegastridae ===
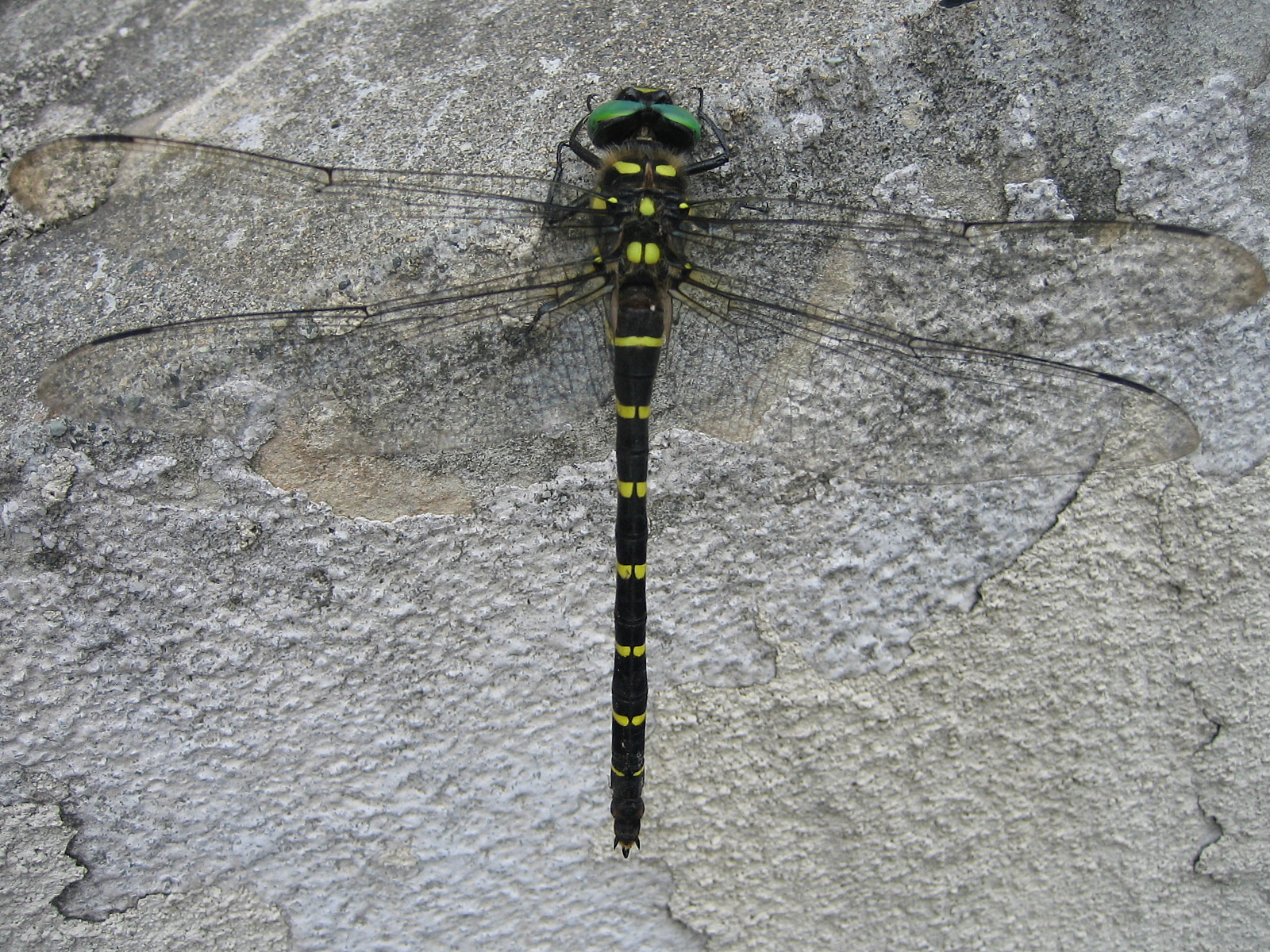
Anotogaster sieboldii

==== Anotogaster ====
- Anotogaster flaveola Lohemann, 1993 ※endemic species
- Anotogaster sieboldii (Selys, 1854)

==== Chlorogomphus ====
- Chlorogomphus brevistigma Oguma, 1926 ※endemic species
- Chlorogomphus risi Chen, 1950 ※endemic species
- Chlorogomphus splendidus Selys, 1878
- Chlorogomphus suzukii (Oguma, 1926)

=== Cordullidae ===
==== Epophthalmia ====
- Epophthalmia elegans (Brauer, 1865)

==== Hemicordulia ====
- Hemicordulia mindana nipponica Asahina, 1980

==== Macromia ====
- Macromia chui Asahina, 1968 ※endemic species
- Macromia clio Ris, 1916
- Macromia urania Ris, 1916

==== Macromidia ====
- Macromidia ishidai Asahina, 1964

==== Somatochlora ====
- Somatochlora taiwana Inoue and Yokota, 2001 ※endemic species

=== Libellulidae ===
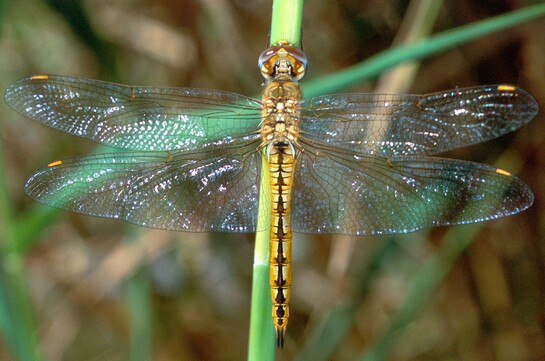
Pantala flavescens

==== Acisoma ====
- Acisoma panorpoides panorpoides Rambur, 1842

==== Agrionoptera ====
- Agrionoptera insignis similis Selys, 1879

==== Brachydiplax ====
- Brachydiplax chalybea flavovittata Ris, 1911

==== Brachythemis ====
- Brachythemis contaminata (Fabricius, 1793)

==== Cratilla ====
- Cratilla lineata assidua Lieftinck, 1953

==== Crocothemis ====
- Crocothemis servilia servilia (Drury, 1770)

==== Deielia ====
- Deielia phaon (Selys, 1883)

==== Diplacodes ====
- Diplacodes trivialis (Rambur, 1842)

==== Hydrobasileus ====
- Hydrobasileus croceus (Brauer, 1867)

==== Lathrecisata ====
- Lathrecisata asiatica asiatica (Frbricius, 1798)

==== Lyriothemis ====
- Lyriothemis flava Oguma, 1915
- Lyriothemis elegantissima Selys, 1883

==== Macrodiplax ====
- Macrodiplax cora (Brauer, 1867)

==== Nannophya ====
- Nannophya pygmaea Rambur, 1842

==== Nannophyopsis ====
- Nannophyopsis clara (Needham, 1930)

==== Neurothemis ====
- Neurothemis fulvia (Drury, 1773)
- Neurothemis ramburii (Kaup, 1866)
- Neurothemis tullia tullia (Drury, 1773)

==== Onychothemis ====
- Onychothemis testacea tonkinensis Martin, 1904

==== Orthetrum ====
- Orthetrum albistyla speciosum (Uhler, 1858)
- Orthetrum glaucum (Brauer, 1865)
- Orthetrum japonicum internum McLachlan, 1894
- Orthetrum luzonicum (Brauer, 1868)
- Orthetrum melania (Selys, 1883)
- Orthetrum pruinosum (Burmeister, 1839)
  - O. p. clelia (Selys, 1878)
  - O. p. neglectum (Rambur, 1842)
- Orthetrum sabina sabina (Drury, 1770)
- Orthetrum testaceum testaceum (Burmeister, 1839)
- Orthetrum triangulare (Selys, 1878)

==== Pantala ====
- Pantala flavescens (Fabricius, 1798)

==== Potamarcha ====
- Potamarcha congener congener (Rambur, 1842)

==== Pseudothemis ====
- Pseudothemis zonata (Burmeister, 1839)

==== Rhyothemis ====
- Rhyothemis regia regia (Brauer, 1867)
- Rhyothemis fuliginosa Selys, 1883
- Rhyothemis severini Ris, 1913
- Rhyothemis triangularis Kirby, 1889
- Rhyothemis variegate arria (Drury, 1773)

==== Sympetrum ====
- Sympetrum baccha baccha (Selys, 1884)
- Sympetrum darwinianum (Selys, 1883)
- Sympetrum eroticum ardens (McLachlan, 1894)
- Sympetrum kunckeli (Selys, 1884)
- Sympetrum cordulegaster (Selys, 1883)
- Sympetrum depressiusculum (Selys, 1841)
- Sympetrum speciosum taiwanum Asahina, 1951 ※endemic subspecies
- Sympetrum fonscolombei (Selys, 1840)

==== Tholymis ====
- Tholymis tillarga (Fabricius, 1798)

==== Tramea ====
- Tramea transmarina Brauer, 1867
  - T. t. euryale (Selys, 1878)
  - T. t. propinqua (Lieftinck, 1942)
- Tramea Virginia (Rambur, 1842)

==== Trithemis ====
- Trithemis aurora (Burmeister, 1839)
- Trithemis festiva (Rambur, 1842)
- Trithemis pallidinervis (Kirby, 1889)

==== Urothemis ====
- Urothemis signata yiei Asahina, 1972 ※endemic subspecies

==== Zygonyx ====
- Zygonyx takasago Asahina, 1966

==== Zyxomma ====
- Zyxomma obtusum Albarda, 1881
- Zyxomma petiolatum Rambur, 1842

== Zygoptera ==
=== Coenagrionidae ===
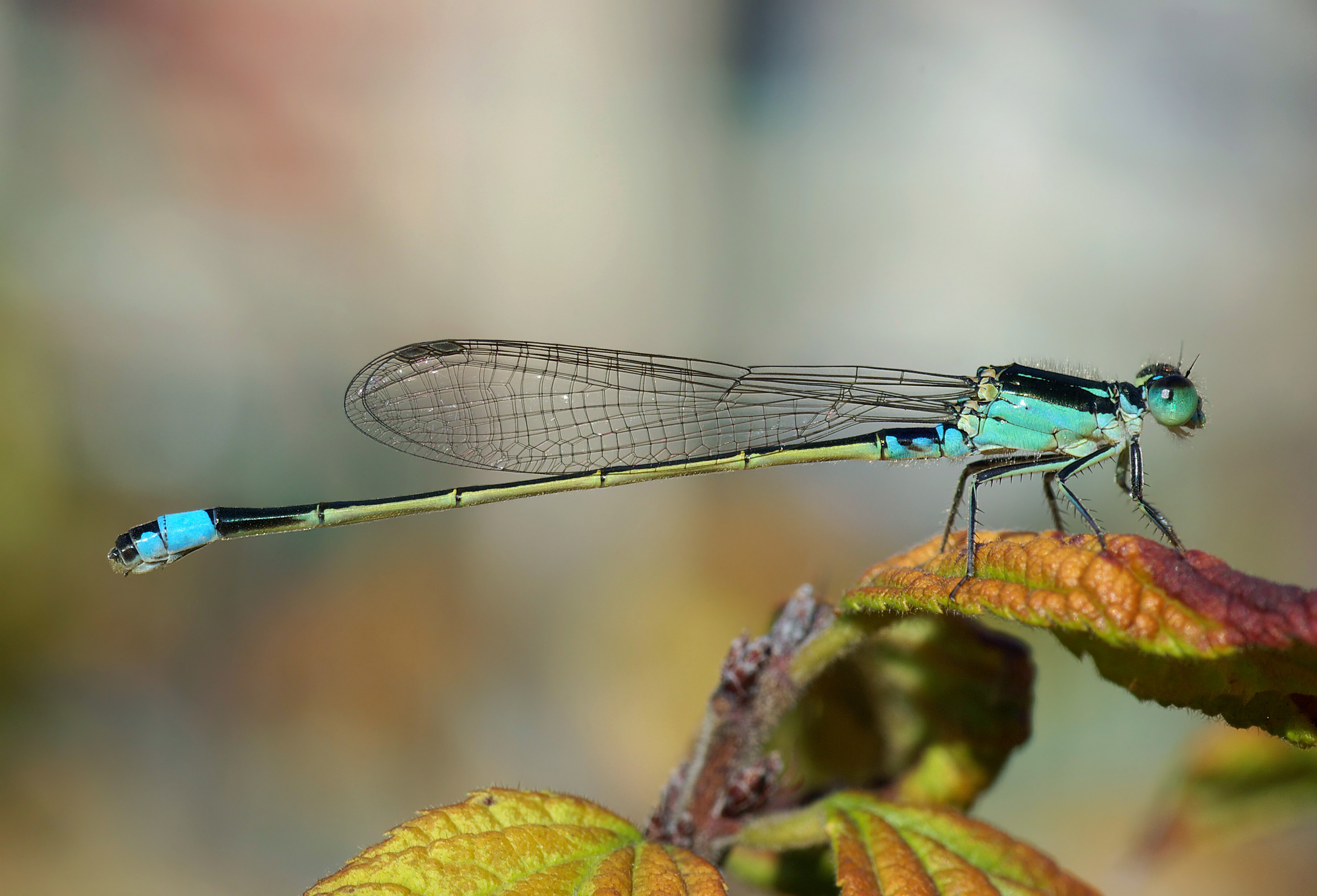
Ischnura senegalensis

==== Aciagrion migratum ====
- Aciagrion migratum (Selys, 1876)

==== Agriocnemis ====
- Agriocnemis femina oryzae Lieftinck, 1962
- Agriocnemis pygmaea (Rambur, 1842)

==== Ceriagrion ====
- Ceriagrion auranticum ryukyuanum Asahina, 1967
- Ceriagrion fallax fallax Ris, 1914
- Ceriagrion melanurum Selys, 1876
- Ceriagrion nipponicum Asahina, 1967

==== Ischnura ====
- Ischnura asiatica (Brauer, 1865)
- Ischnura aurora aurora (Brauer, 1865)
- Ischnura senegalensis (Rambur, 1842)

==== Mortonagrion ====
- Mortonagrion hirosei Asahina, 1972
- Mortonagrion selenion (Ris, 1916)

==== Onychargia ====
- Onychargia atrocyana Selys, 1865

==== Paracercion ====
- Paracercion calamorum dyeri (Fraser, 1919)
- Paracercion sexlineatum (Selys, 1883)
- Paracercion sieboldii (Selys, 1876)

==== Pseudagrion ====
- Pseudagrion microcephalum (Rambur, 1842)
- Pseudagrion pilidorsum pilidorsum (Brauer, 1868)

=== Platycnemididae ===
==== Calicnemia ====
- Calicnemia eximia (Selys, 1863)

==== Coeliccia ====
- Coeliccia cyanomelas Ris, 1912
- Coeliccia flavicauda flavicauda Ris, 1912 ※endemic subspecies

==== Copera ====
- Copera ciliata (Selys, 1863)
- Copera marginipes (Rambur, 1842)

=== Protoneuridae ===
- Prodasineura croconota (Ris, 1916)

=== Euphaeidae ===
==== Bayadera ====
- Bayadera brevicauda brevicauda Fraser, 1928 ※endemic subspecies

==== Euphaea ====
- Euphaea formosa Hagen, 1869 ※endemic species

=== Lestidae ===
==== Indolestes ====
- Indolestes cyaneus (Selys, 1862)

==== Lestes ====
- Lestes concinnus Hagen, 1862
- Lestes praemorsus decipiens Kirby 1893

==== Orolestes ====
- Orolestes selysi McLachlan, 1895

=== Megapodagrionidae ===
- Rhipidolestes aculeatus aculeatus Ris, 1912

=== Synlestidae ===
==== Megalestes ====
- Megalestes maai Chen, 1947

==== Sinolestes ====
- Sinolestes editus Needham, 1930

=== Calopterygidae ===
==== Matrona ====
- Matrona cyanoptera Hamalainen and Yeh, 2000 ※endemic species

==== Mnais ====
- Mnais andersoni tenuis Oguma, 1913

==== Neurobasis ====
- Neurobasis chinensis (Linnaeus, 1758)

==== Psolodesmus ====
- Psolodesmus mandarinus McLachlan, 1870
  - P. m. dorothea Williamson, 1904 ※endemic subspecies
  - P. m. mandarinus McLachlan, 1870 ※endemic subspecies

=== Chlorocyphidae ===
==== Aristocypha ====
- Aristocypha baibarana (Matsumura, 1931) ※endemic species

==== Heliocypha ====
- Heliocypha perforate perforate (Percheron, 1835)

==== Libellago ====
- Libellago lineata lineata (Burmeister, 1839)
