= Lestinogomphus africanus =

Conservation status
- Data Deficient (IUCN 3.1)

Scientific classification
- Kingdom: Animalia
- Phylum: Arthropoda
- Clade: Pancrustacea
- Class: Insecta
- Order: Odonata
- Infraorder: Anisoptera
- Family: Gomphidae
- Genus: Lestinogomphus
- Species: L. africanus

Binomial name
- Lestinogomphus africanus (Fraser, 1926)

Synonyms
- Echinopterogomphus africanus Fraser, 1926

Species of dragonfly

Lestinogomphus africanus is a species of dragonfly in the family Gomphidae. It is found in parts of Africa and typically inhabits areas near rivers and other freshwater bodies.

== Distribution ==
Lestinogomphus africanus is found in sub-Saharan Africa. Species of the genus Lestinogomphus are distributed across tropical Africa.

== Taxonomy ==
Lestinogomphus africanus was first described by Fraser in 1926.

== Description ==
Lestinogomphus africanus is a small and slender dragonfly. Its body coloration is predominantly greenish-yellow with indistinct brownish or blackish markings. A distinguishing feature of the genus, which is present in this species, is the significantly elongated tenth abdominal segment (S10), which is nearly as long as the eighth and ninth segments combined. The wings are hyaline (clear) with dark venation.
