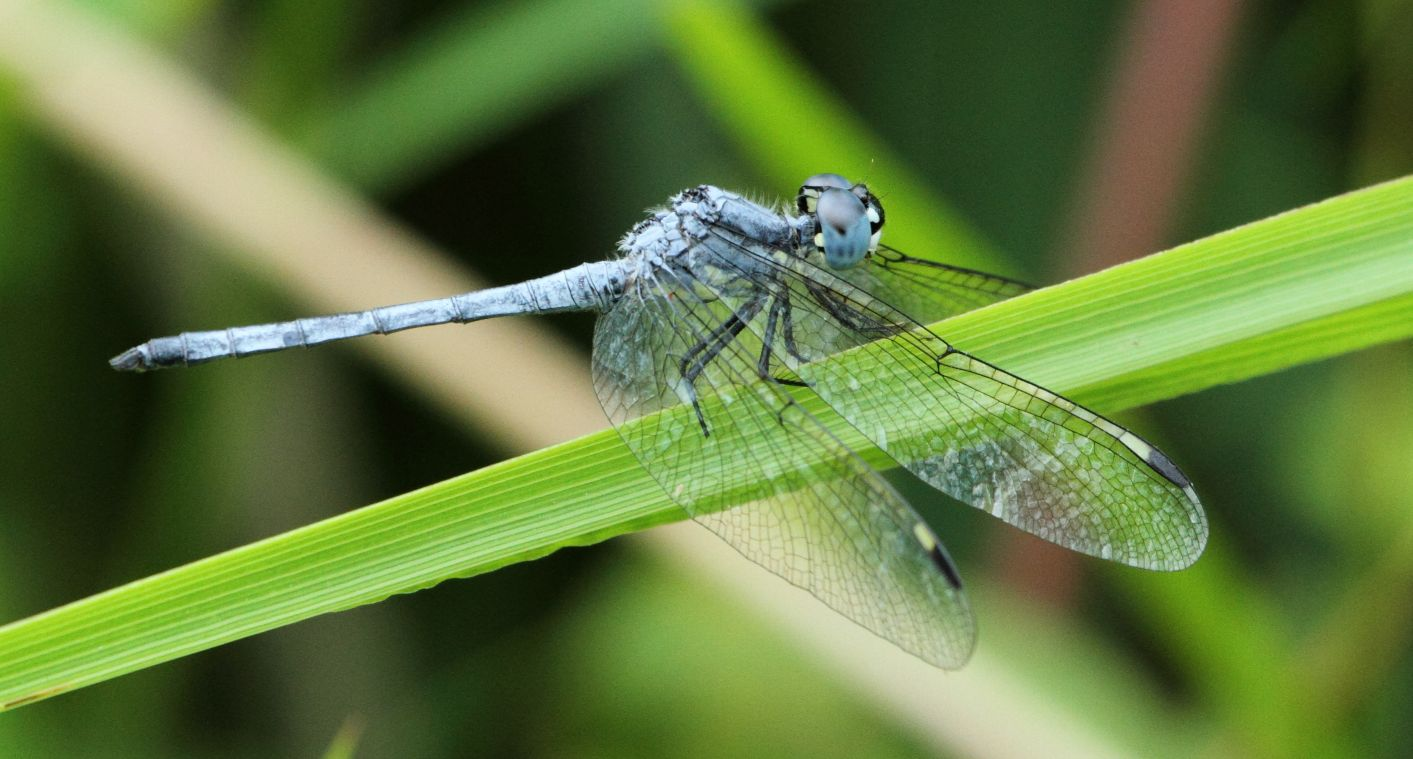
- Male

Conservation status
- Least Concern (IUCN 3.1)

Scientific classification
- Kingdom: Animalia
- Phylum: Arthropoda
- Class: Insecta
- Order: Odonata
- Infraorder: Anisoptera
- Family: Libellulidae
- Genus: Hemistigma
- Species: H. albipunctum

Binomial name
- Hemistigma albipunctum (Rambur, 1842)

= Hemistigma albipunctum =

Species of dragonfly

Hemistigma albipunctum, also known as the piedspot, is a species of dragonfly in the family Libellulidae.

== Distribution ==
It is found in Angola, Botswana, Cameroon, Central African Republic, Chad, the Democratic Republic of the Congo, Ivory Coast, Equatorial Guinea, Ethiopia, Gambia, Ghana, Guinea, Kenya, Liberia, Madagascar, Malawi, Mozambique, Namibia, Nigeria, Senegal, Sierra Leone, South Africa, Tanzania, Togo, Uganda, Zambia, Zimbabwe, and possibly Burundi.

== Habitat ==
Its natural habitats include open marsh and swamp in tropical Africa.

== Description ==
It has a wingspan of 53 mm and is slender. There is a blue bloom on the body of the male, and a black streak across the front of the forewings. There are brown spots on the wingtips of females. It tends to fly over small ponds or streams, settling frequently.

== Identification ==
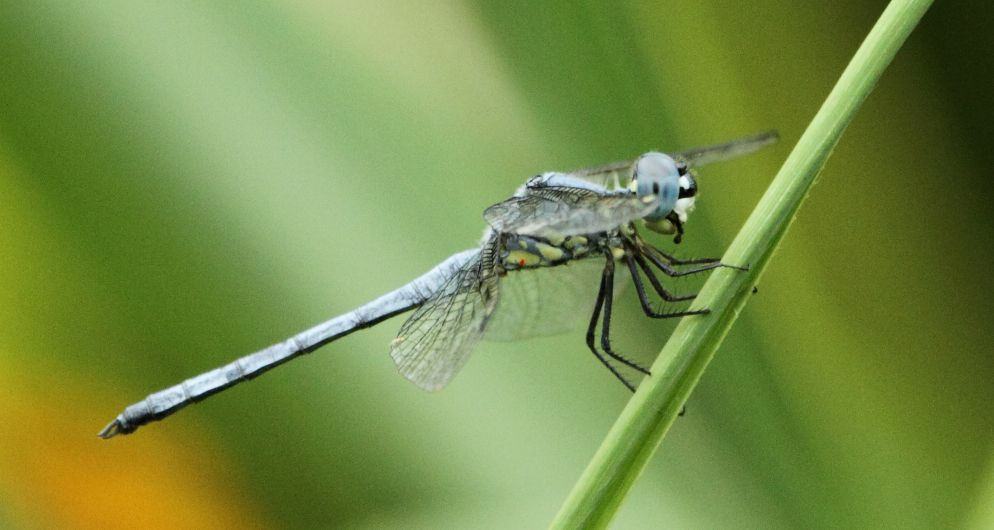
Male

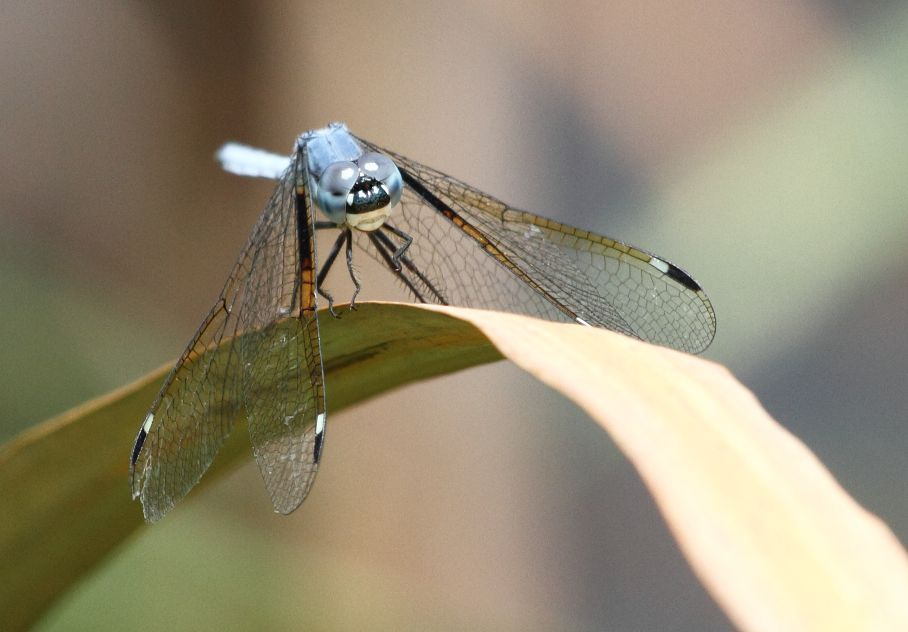
Male

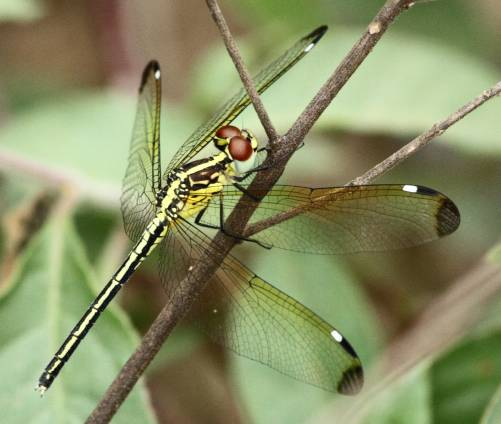
Female

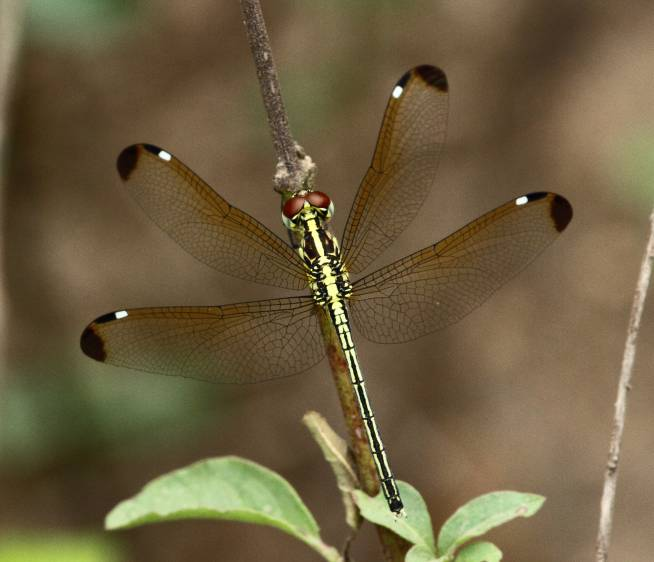
Female

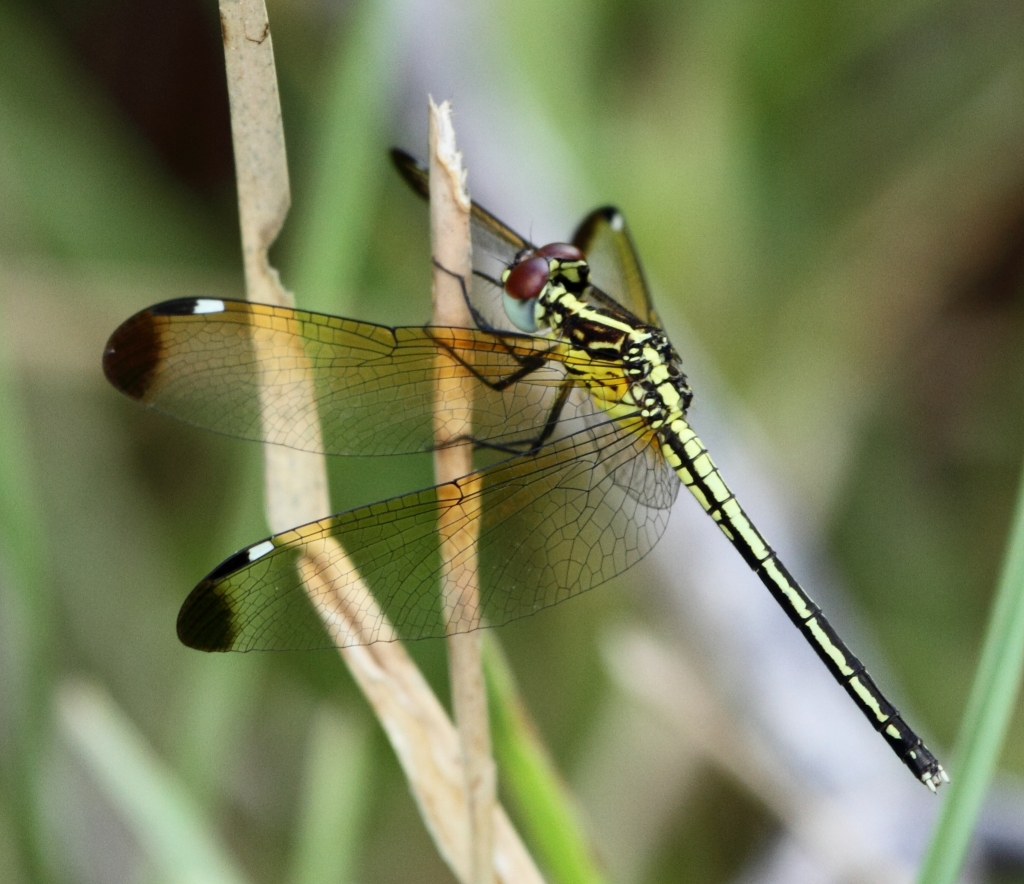
Female
