= Pseudagrion melanicterum =

Black-and-yellow sprite

Conservation status
- Least Concern (IUCN 3.1)

Scientific classification
- Kingdom: Animalia
- Phylum: Arthropoda
- Clade: Pancrustacea
- Class: Insecta
- Order: Odonata
- Suborder: Zygoptera
- Family: Coenagrionidae
- Genus: Pseudagrion
- Species: P. melanicterum

Binomial name
- Pseudagrion melanicterum Selys, 1876

Species of damselfly

Pseudagrion melanicterum, the black-and-yellow sprite, is a species of damselfly in the family Coenagrionidae. It is found in Angola, Benin, Cameroon, Central African Republic, the Republic of the Congo, the Democratic Republic of the Congo, Ivory Coast, Equatorial Guinea, Ghana, Guinea, Kenya, Liberia, Nigeria, Senegal, Sierra Leone, Tanzania, Togo, Uganda, Zambia, possibly Burkina Faso, and possibly Sudan. Its natural habitats are subtropical or tropical moist lowland forests and rivers.
