= Lestinogomphus =

Scientific classification
- Kingdom: Animalia
- Phylum: Arthropoda
- Class: Insecta
- Order: Odonata
- Infraorder: Anisoptera
- Family: Gomphidae
- Genus: Lestinogomphus; Martin, 1911

Genus of dragonflies

Lestinogomphus is a genus of dragonfly in the family Gomphidae. It contains the following species:

- Lestinogomphus angustus Martin, 1911 – common fairytail, spined fairytail
- Lestinogomphus bivittatus (Pinhey, 1961)
- Lestinogomphus congoensis Cammaerts, 1969
- Lestinogomphus matilei Legrand & Lachaise, 2001
- Lestinogomphus minutus Gambles, 1968
- Lestinogomphus silkeae Kipping, 2010
