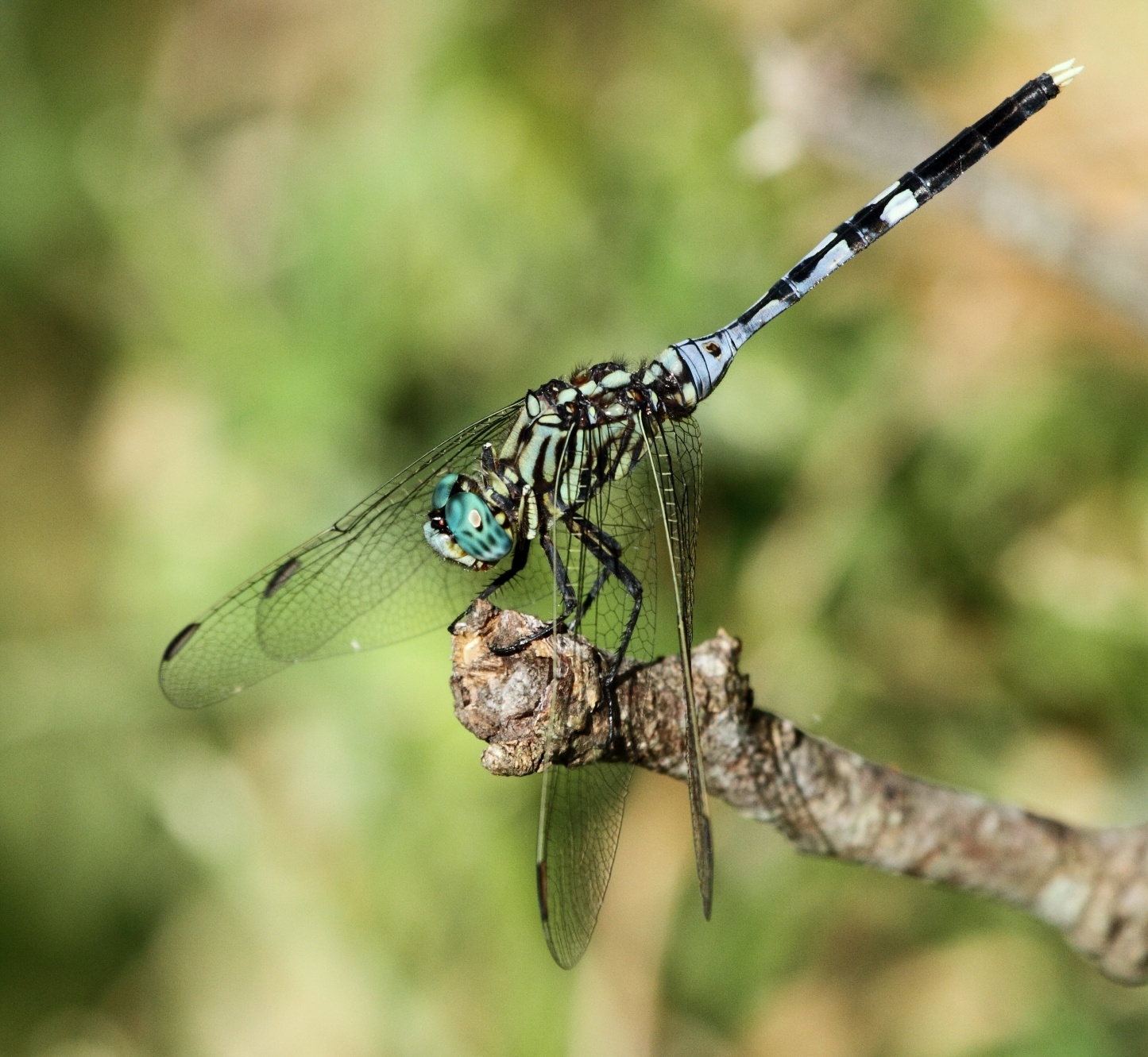
- Male, South Africa
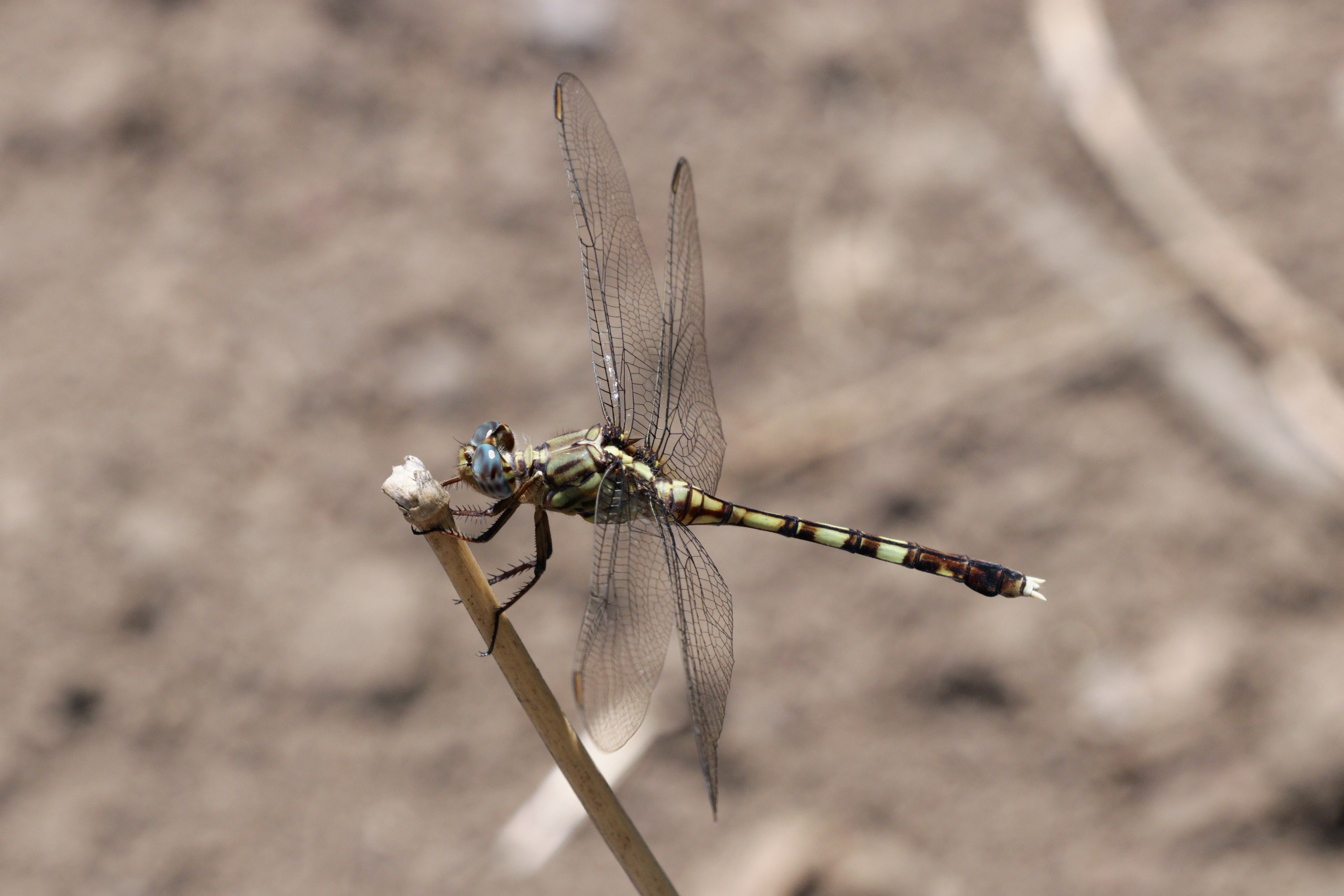
- Female, Madagascar

Conservation status
- Least Concern (IUCN 3.1)

Scientific classification
- Kingdom: Animalia
- Phylum: Arthropoda
- Clade: Pancrustacea
- Class: Insecta
- Order: Odonata
- Infraorder: Anisoptera
- Family: Libellulidae
- Genus: Orthetrum
- Species: O. stemmale

Binomial name
- Orthetrum stemmale (Burmeister, 1839)

= Orthetrum stemmale =

Species of dragonfly

Orthetrum stemmale is a species of dragonfly in the family Libellulidae. It is found in Angola, Benin, Botswana, Cameroon, Central African Republic, the Republic of the Congo, the Democratic Republic of the Congo, Ivory Coast, Equatorial Guinea, Gambia, Ghana, Guinea, Kenya, Liberia, Malawi, Mali, Mozambique, Namibia, Nigeria, São Tomé and Príncipe, Sierra Leone, Sudan, Tanzania, Togo, Uganda, Zambia, Zimbabwe, and possibly Burundi. Its natural habitats are subtropical or tropical moist lowland forests, subtropical or tropical dry shrubland, subtropical or tropical moist shrubland, intermittent rivers, shrub-dominated wetlands, swamps, intermittent freshwater lakes, freshwater marshes, and intermittent freshwater marshes.
