= Obelisk posture =

Body position by Odonata

The obelisk posture is a handstand-like position that some dragonflies and damselflies assume to prevent overheating on sunny days. The abdomen is raised until its tip points at the sun, minimizing the surface area exposed to solar radiation. When the sun is close to directly overhead, the vertical alignment of the insect's body resembles an obelisk.

== Function and occurrence ==
Dragonflies may also raise their abdomens for other reasons. For instance, male blue dashers (Pachydiplax longipennis) assume an obelisk-like posture while guarding their territories or during conflicts with other males, displaying the blue pruinescence on their abdomens to best advantage. However, both females and males will raise their abdomens at high temperature and lower them again if shaded. This behavior can be demonstrated in the laboratory by heating captive blue dashers with a 250 watt lamp, and has been shown to be effective in stopping or slowing the rise in their body temperature.

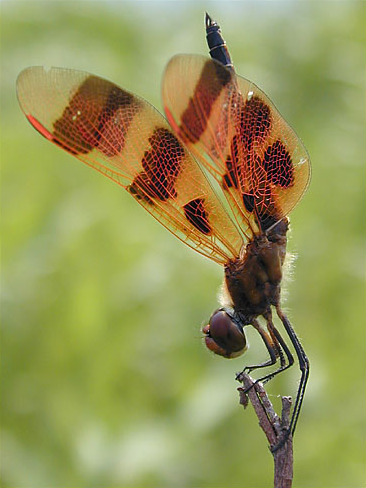
Celithemis eponina in the obelisk posture

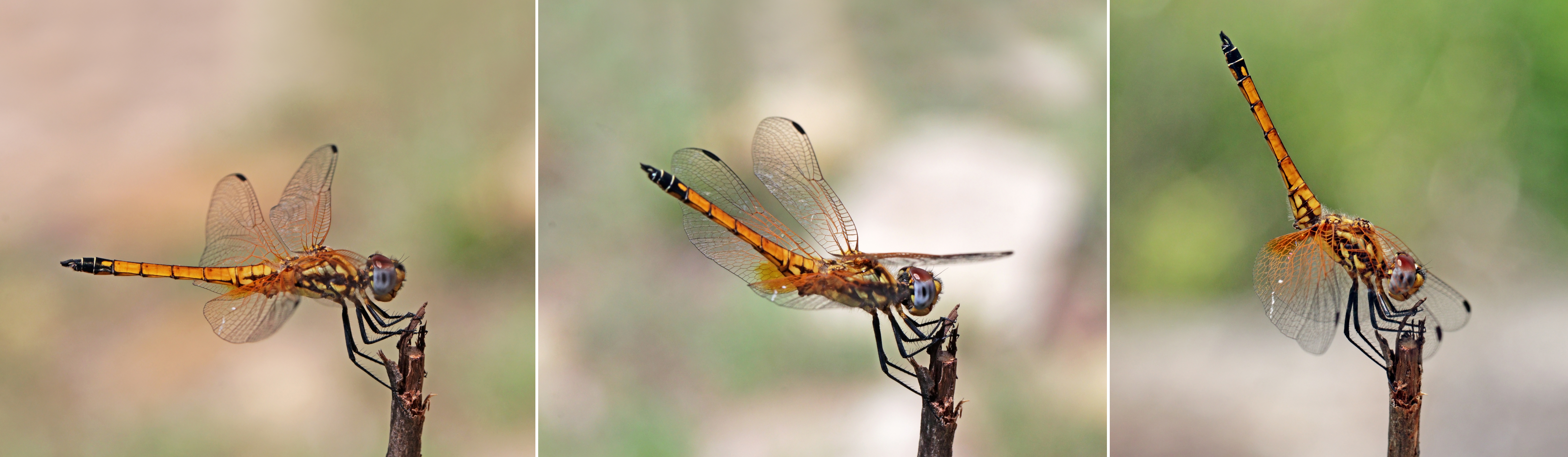
young male Trithemis selika moving into obelisk posture

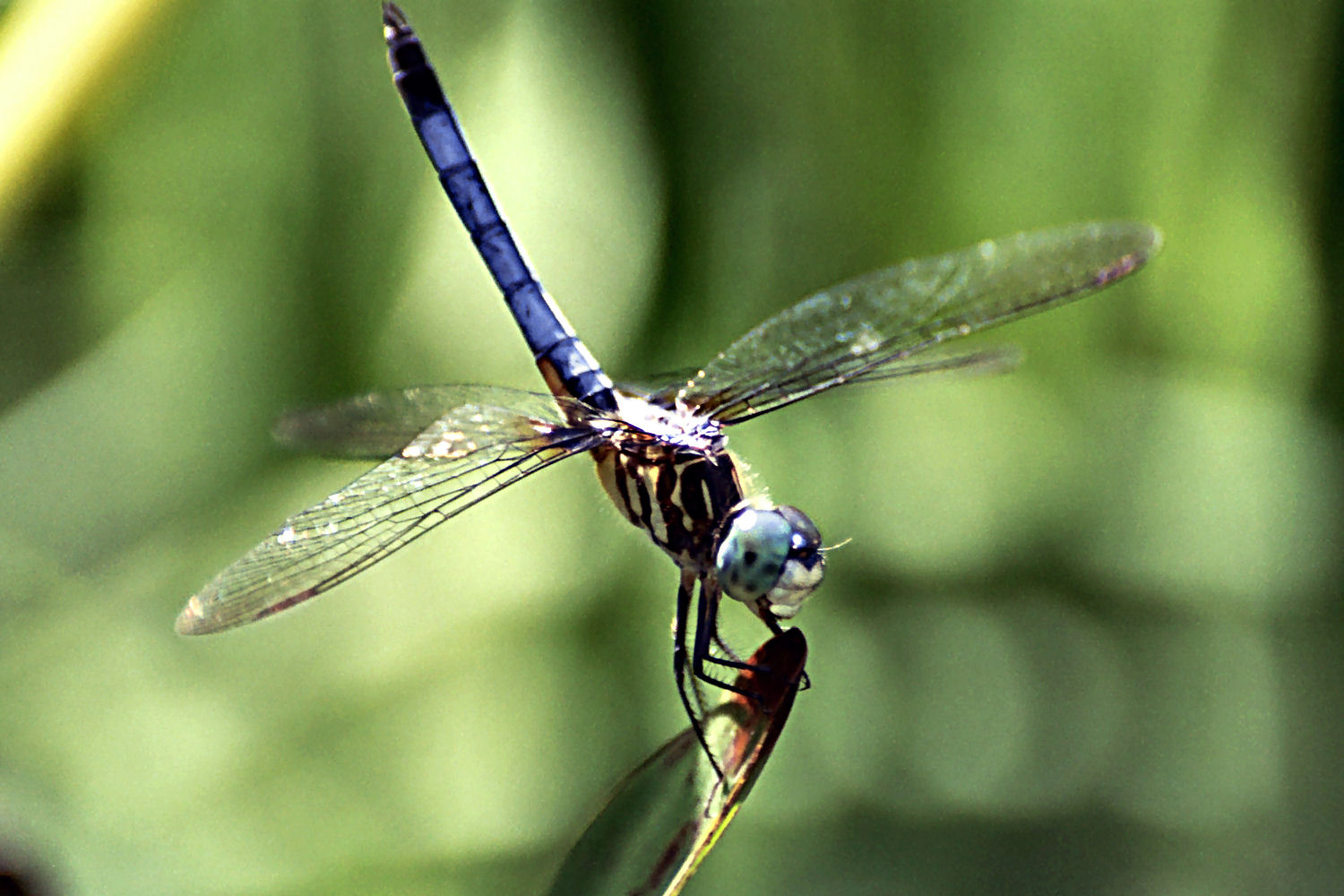
Blue dasher: a raised abdomen may be either a response to heat or a threat display

The obelisk posture has been observed in about 30 species in the demoiselle, clubtail, and skimmer families. All are "perchers"—sit-and-wait predators that fly up from a perch to take prey and perch again to eat it. Since they spend most of their time stationary, perchers have the most opportunity to thermoregulate by adjusting their position.

== Other forms of postural thermoregulation ==
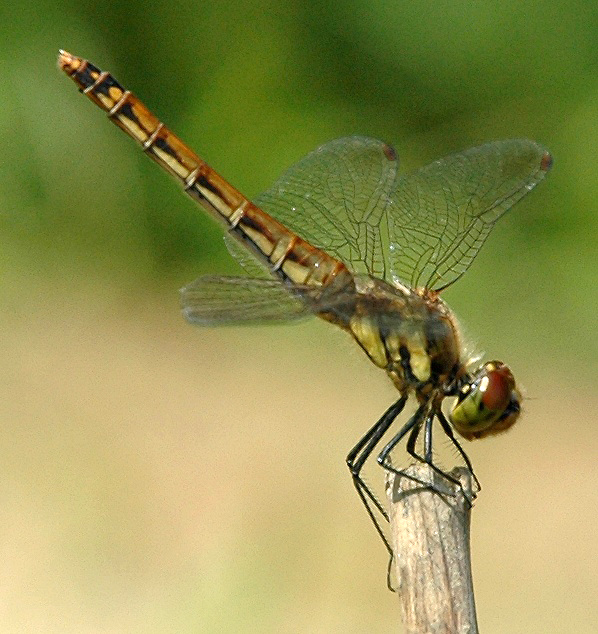
When the sun is low but the air is still hot, dragonflies may adopt a modified obelisk position with the abdomen only partially raised.

Some species, including the dragonhunter (Hagenius brevistylus), reduce exposure to the sun by perching with the abdomen pointed downward, rather than upward. The tropical skimmer dragonfly Diastatops intensa, whose wings are mostly black, points its wings rather than its abdomen at the sun, apparently to reduce the heat they absorb.

While flying, some saddlebags gliders (genus Tramea) lower their abdomens into the shade provided by dark patches at the bases of their hindwings. The same behavior has been observed in Pseudothemis zonata, which has a similar hindwing patch.

Dragonflies also use postural thermoregulation to increase body temperature. Keeping the flight muscles in the thorax warm is especially important, since otherwise the insect cannot fly. Dragonflies may position their wings to reflect sun onto themselves, or, if they are perched on a warm surface, to form a "greenhouse" over the thorax. When the sun is low in the sky, they may raise or lower their abdomens so that their bodies are perpendicular to the sun's rays, maximizing the surface area that receives direct sun; although this can resemble the obelisk posture, the purpose is opposite.
