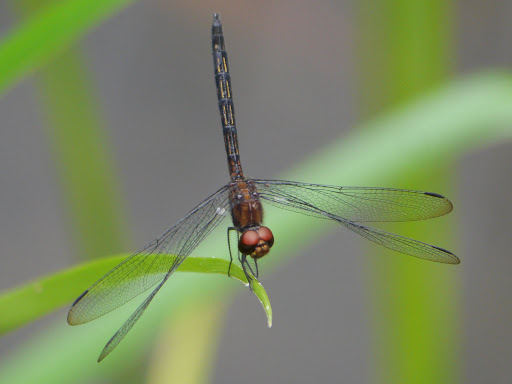
- Trithemis aenea male in the Democratic Republic of the Congo

Conservation status
- Least Concern (IUCN 3.1)

Scientific classification
- Kingdom: Animalia
- Phylum: Arthropoda
- Clade: Pancrustacea
- Class: Insecta
- Order: Odonata
- Infraorder: Anisoptera
- Superfamily: Libelluloidea
- Family: Libellulidae
- Genus: Trithemis
- Species: T. aenea

Binomial name
- Trithemis aenea Pinhey, 1961

= Trithemis aenea =

Species of dragonfly

Trithemis aenea, the bronze dropwing, is a species of dragonfly in the family Libellulidae. It is found in Western and Central Africa.
