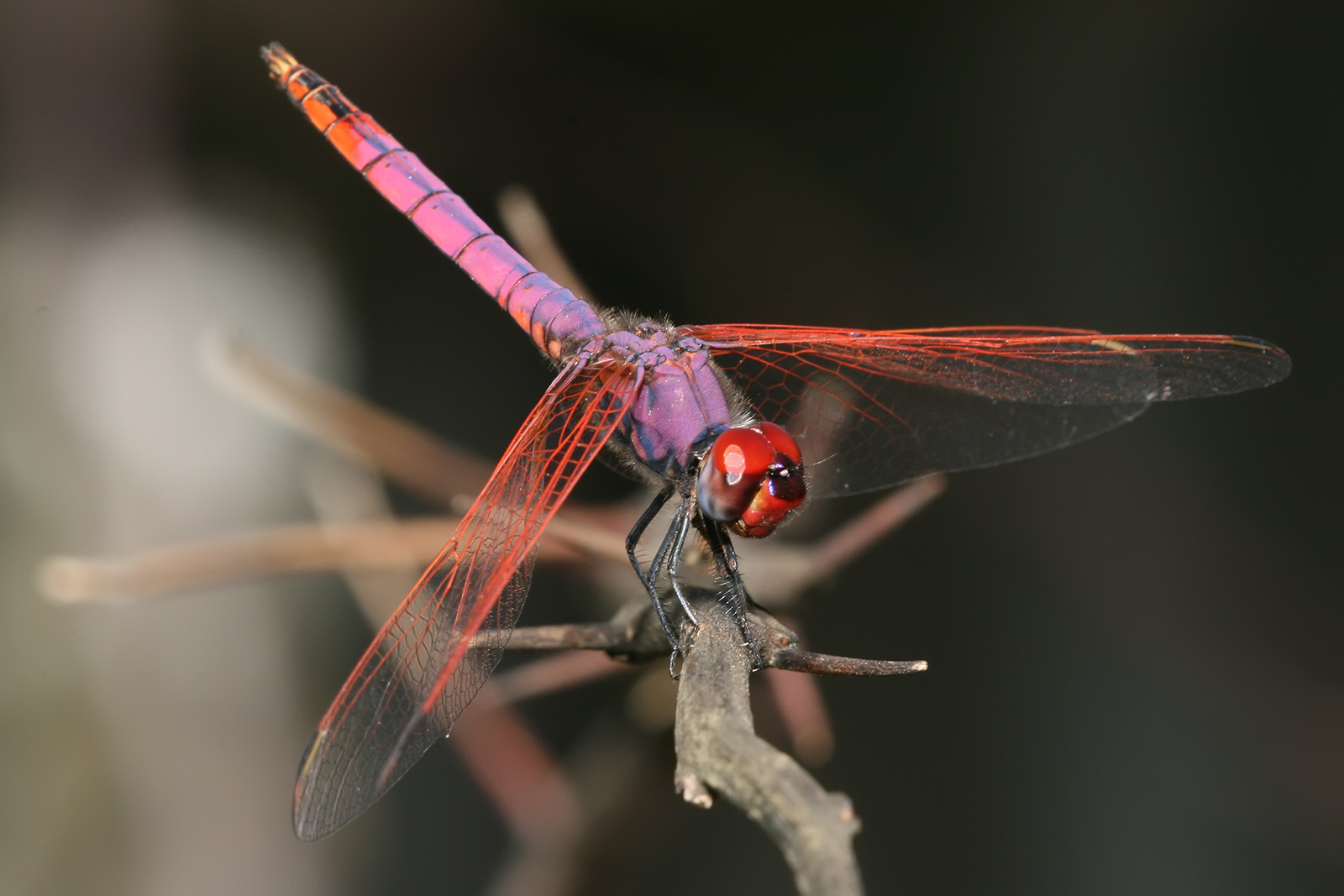
- Trithemis annulata

Scientific classification
- Kingdom: Animalia
- Phylum: Arthropoda
- Clade: Pancrustacea
- Class: Insecta
- Order: Odonata
- Infraorder: Anisoptera
- Superfamily: Libelluloidea
- Family: Libellulidae
- Subfamily: Trithemistinae
- Genus: Trithemis; Brauer, 1868

= Trithemis =

Genus of dragonflies

Trithemis is a genus of dragonflies in the family Libellulidae. They are commonly known as dropwings. There are over 40 species, mainly from Africa; two are endemic to Madagascar, and five can be found in Asia. They are found in a wide variety of habitats; some species being adapted to permanent streams in forests, and others being capable of breeding in temporary pools in deserts.

== Species ==
The genus contains the following species:

Male	Female	Scientific name	Common name	Distribution
		Trithemis aconita Lieftinck, 1969	monkshood dropwing, halfshade dropwing	Benin, Botswana, Cameroon, Ivory Coast, Equatorial Guinea, Ethiopia, Ghana, Guinea, Kenya, Liberia, Malawi, Mozambique, Namibia, Nigeria, South Africa, Tanzania, Togo, Uganda, Zambia, Zimbabwe, and possibly Burundi
		Trithemis aenea Pinhey, 1961	bronze dropwing	Western and Central Africa.
		Trithemis aequalis Lieftinck, 1969	swamp dropwing	Botswana, Namibia, and Zambia.
		Trithemis africana (Brauer, 1867)	western phantom dropwing	Western and Central Africa, in Cameroon, Sierra Leone, Liberia, and Côte d'Ivoire.
		Trithemis annulata (Palisot de Beauvois, 1807)	violet dropwing, violet-marked darter	Africa, in the Middle East, in the Arabian Peninsula and southern Europe.
		Trithemis anomala Pinhey, 1955	striped dropwing	Zambia
		Trithemis arteriosa (Burmeister, 1839)	red-veined dropwing	Algeria, Angola, Benin, Botswana, Burkina Faso, Burundi, Cameroon, Canary Islands, Cape Verde, Central African Republic, Chad, Comoros, Congo, Democratic Republic of the Congo, Egypt, Equatorial Guinea, Eritrea, Eswatini, Ethiopia, Gabon, Gambia, Ghana, Guinea, Guinea-Bissau, Ivory Coast, Kenya, Lesotho, Liberia, Libya, Madagascar, Malawi, Mali, Mauritania, Mayotte, Morocco, Mozambique, Namibia, Niger, Nigeria, Rwanda, São Tomé and Príncipe, Senegal, Seychelles, Sierra Leone, Somalia, South Africa, South Sudan, Sudan, Tanzania, Togo, Tunisia, Uganda, Zambia, Zimbabwe, Crete, Cyprus, Iran, Israel, Jordan, Kuwait, Lebanon, Oman, Palestinian Territory, Saudi Arabia, Syria, Turkey, United Arab Emirates, and Yemen.
		Trithemis aurora (Burmeister, 1839)	crimson marsh glider	Indian subcontinent and Southeast Asia.
		Trithemis basitincta Ris, 1912		Angola, Cameroon, Gabon, Ghana, Liberia, Sierra Leone
		Trithemis bifida Pinhey, 1970	shadow dropwing	Democratic Republic of the Congo, Ivory Coast, Kenya, Sierra Leone, Zambia, Zimbabwe, and possibly Tanzania.
		Trithemis bredoi Fraser, 1953	river dropwing	Gondokoro, Sudan
		Trithemis brydeni Pinhey, 1970	percher-like dropwing	Botswana and Zambia.
		Trithemis congolica Pinhey, 1970	Congo dropwing	Democratic Republic of the Congo, Gabon
		Trithemis dejouxi Pinhey, 1978	stonewash dropwing	Benin, Côte d'Ivoire, Central African Republic, Eritrea, Ethiopia, Ghana, Liberia, Mali, Nigeria, Republic of Guinea
		Trithemis dichroa Karsch, 1893	small dropwing, black dropwing	Angola, Benin, Cameroon, Central African Republic, the Democratic Republic of the Congo, Ivory Coast, Equatorial Guinea, Ghana, Guinea, Liberia, Mali, Nigeria, Sierra Leone, Sudan, Togo, Uganda, and Zambia.
		Trithemis donaldsoni (Calvert, 1899)	denim dropwing	Angola, Botswana, Democratic Republic of the Congo, Ethiopia, Kenya, Malawi, Mozambique, Namibia, Republic of South Africa, Rwanda, Tanzania, Uganda, Zambia, Zimbabwe
		Trithemis dorsalis (Rambur, 1842)	round-hook dropwing, highland dropwing	Angola, the Democratic Republic of the Congo, Guinea, Kenya, Mozambique, Sierra Leone, South Africa, Tanzania, Uganda, Zambia, Zimbabwe, possibly Burundi, and possibly Malawi
		Trithemis ellenbeckii Förster, 1906	Ethiopian dropwing	Ethiopia.
		Trithemis festiva (Rambur, 1842)	indigo dropwing, black stream glider	Greece, Cyprus and Turkey, throughout Asia to New Guinea
		Trithemis fumosa Pinhey, 1962		Central African Republic, Congo-Brazzaville, Democratic Republic of the Congo, Gabon
		Trithemis furva Karsch, 1899	navy dropwing	Angola, Cameroon, Chad, Ivory Coast, Equatorial Guinea, Ethiopia, Guinea, Kenya, Liberia, Madagascar, Malawi, Mozambique, Namibia, Nigeria, Sierra Leone, Somalia, South Africa, Sudan, Tanzania, Uganda, Zambia, Zimbabwe
		Trithemis grouti Pinhey, 1961	black dropwing, dark dropwing	Angola, Benin, Burkina Faso, Cameroon, the Republic of the Congo, the Democratic Republic of the Congo, Ivory Coast, Equatorial Guinea, Gabon, Gambia, Ghana, Guinea, Liberia, Nigeria, Sierra Leone, Uganda, and Zambia.
		Trithemis hartwigi Pinhey, 1970	superb dropwing	Cameroon and Equatorial Guinea.
		Trithemis hecate Ris, 1912	silhouette dropwing, hecate dropwing	Botswana, Chad, the Democratic Republic of the Congo, Gambia, Guinea, Kenya, Liberia, Madagascar, Malawi, Mozambique, Namibia, Senegal, South Africa, Tanzania, Uganda, Zambia, Zimbabwe, and possibly Burundi.
		Trithemis hinnula Dijkstra, Mézière & Kipping, 2015	mule dropwing	Gabon
		Trithemis imitata Pinhey, 1961	copycat dropwing	Democratic Republic of the Congo and Uganda.
		Trithemis integra Dijkstra, 2007	Albertine dropwing	Angola, Democratic Republic of the Congo, Tanzania, Uganda
		Trithemis kalula Kirby, 1900	pretty dropwing	Burkina Faso, Côte d'Ivoire, Cameroon, Central African Republic, Democratic Republic of the Congo, Guinee-Bissau, Liberia, Mali, Nigeria, Republic of Guinea, Sierra Leone
		Trithemis kirbyi Selys, 1891	orange-winged dropwing, Kirby's dropwing	Algeria, Angola, Benin, Botswana, Burkina Faso, Cameroon, Chad, Congo-Brazzaville, Democratic Republic of the Congo, Egypt, Eritrea, Eswatini, Ethiopia, Gambia, Ghana, Guinee-Bissau, Kenya, Liberia, Libya, Malawi, Mali, Mauritania, Morocco, Mozambique, Namibia, Nigeria, Republic of South Africa, Senegal, Somalia, Sudan, Tanzania, Togo, Tunisia, Uganda, Zambia, Zimbabwe
		Trithemis legrandi Dijkstra, Mézière & Kipping, 2015	robust dropwing	Cameroon, Gabon
		Trithemis lilacina Förster, 1899		Indonesia
		Trithemis longistyla (Fraser, 1953)		Democratic Republic of the Congo
		Trithemis monardi Ris, 1931	Monard's dropwing, fluttering dropwing	Angola, Benin, Botswana, Burkina Faso, Cameroon, Central African Republic, the Democratic Republic of the Congo, Ivory Coast, Ethiopia, Gabon, Gambia, Ghana, Kenya, Malawi, Mali, Mozambique, Namibia, Nigeria, Sierra Leone, Uganda, Zambia, and Zimbabwe.
		Trithemis morrisoni Damm & Hadrys, 2009	rapids dropwing	Namibia, Zambia
		Trithemis nigra Longfield, 1936		São Tomé and Príncipe
		Trithemis nuptialis Karsch, 1894	hairy-legged dropwing	Angola, Cameroon, Congo-Brazzaville, Democratic Republic of the Congo, Equatorial Guinea, Gabon, Tanzania, Uganda, Zambia
		Trithemis osvaldae d'Andrea & Carfi, 1997		Cameroon, Gabon
		Trithemis pallidinervis (Kirby, 1889)	long-legged marsh glider	Asia
		Trithemis palustris Damm & Hadrys, 2009	marsh dropwing	Namibia
		Trithemis persephone Ris, 1912		Madagascar
		Trithemis pluvialis Förster, 1906	riffle-and-reed dropwing, river dropwing, russet dropwing	Angola, Democratic Republic of the Congo, Kenya, Malawi, Mozambique, Namibia, Republic of South Africa, Rwanda, Swaziland, Tanzania, Uganda, Zambia, Zimbabwe
		Trithemis pruinata Karsch, 1899	cobalt dropwing	Angola, Cameroon, Central African Republic, Congo-Brazzaville, Democratic Republic of the Congo, Gabon, Ghana, Kenya, Nigeria, Republic of Guinea, Senegal, Tanzania, Togo, Uganda, Zambia
		Trithemis selika Selys, 1869		Madagascar
		Trithemis stictica (Burmeister, 1839)	jaunty dropwing	Angola, Burundi, Cameroon, Congo-Brazzaville, Democratic Republic of the Congo, Eswatini, Ethiopia, Ghana, Kenya, Liberia, Malawi, Mozambique, Namibia, Nigeria, Republic of South Africa, Rwanda, Sierra Leone, Somalia, Sudan, Tanzania, Uganda, Zambia, Zimbabwe
		Trithemis werneri Ris, 1912	elegant dropwing	Angola, the Republic of the Congo, the Democratic Republic of the Congo, Kenya, Malawi, Mozambique, Namibia, Nigeria, South Africa, Sudan, Tanzania, Uganda, Zambia, Zimbabwe, and possibly Burundi.
