= Trithemis longistyla =

Conservation status
- Least Concern (IUCN 3.1)

Scientific classification
- Kingdom: Animalia
- Phylum: Arthropoda
- Class: Insecta
- Order: Odonata
- Infraorder: Anisoptera
- Family: Libellulidae
- Genus: Trithemis
- Species: T. longistyla

Binomial name
- Trithemis longistyla (Fraser, 1953)

Synonyms
- Congothemis longistyla

Species of insect

Trithemis longistyla is a species of dragonfly in the family Libellulidae. It is endemic to the Democratic Republic of the Congo. Little is known about the species.
