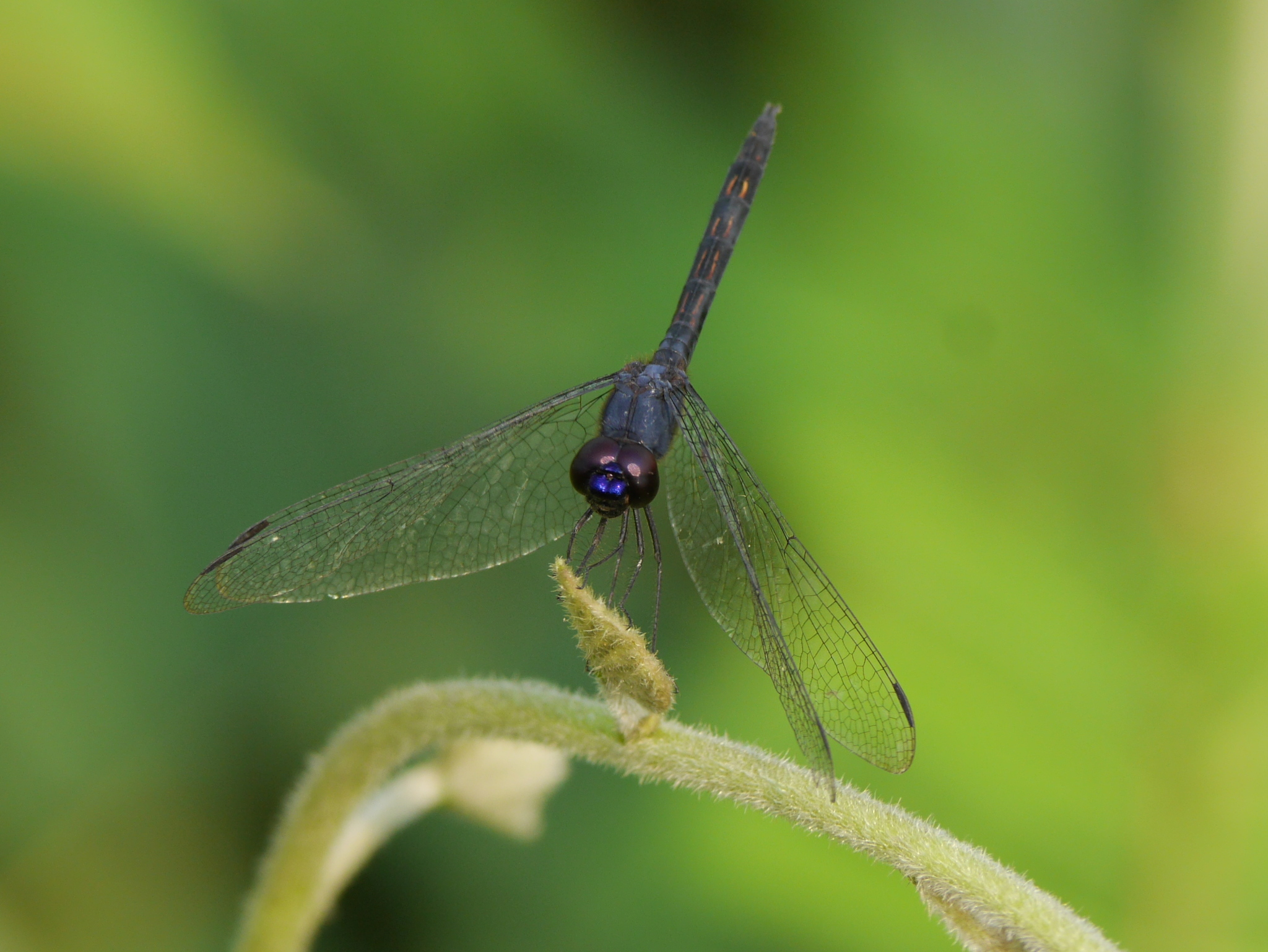
- Trithemis grouti male in the Republic of Congo

Conservation status
- Least Concern (IUCN 3.1)

Scientific classification
- Kingdom: Animalia
- Phylum: Arthropoda
- Clade: Pancrustacea
- Class: Insecta
- Order: Odonata
- Infraorder: Anisoptera
- Superfamily: Libelluloidea
- Family: Libellulidae
- Genus: Trithemis
- Species: T. grouti

Binomial name
- Trithemis grouti Pinhey, 1961

= Trithemis grouti =

Species of dragonfly

Trithemis grouti, the Black Dropwing, is a species of dragonfly in the family Libellulidae. It is found in Angola, Benin, Burkina Faso, Cameroon, the Republic of the Congo, the Democratic Republic of the Congo, Ivory Coast, Equatorial Guinea, Gabon, Gambia, Ghana, Guinea, Liberia, Nigeria, Sierra Leone, Uganda, and Zambia. Its natural habitats are subtropical or tropical moist lowland forests and rivers.
