= Trithemis bifida =

Conservation status
- Least Concern (IUCN 3.1)

Scientific classification
- Kingdom: Animalia
- Phylum: Arthropoda
- Class: Insecta
- Order: Odonata
- Infraorder: Anisoptera
- Family: Libellulidae
- Genus: Trithemis
- Species: T. bifida

Binomial name
- Trithemis bifida Pinhey, 1970

Species of dragonfly

Trithemis bifida is a species of dragonfly in the family Libellulidae. It is found in the Democratic Republic of the Congo, Ivory Coast, Kenya, Sierra Leone, Zambia, Zimbabwe, and possibly Tanzania. Its natural habitats are subtropical or tropical moist lowland forests and rivers.
