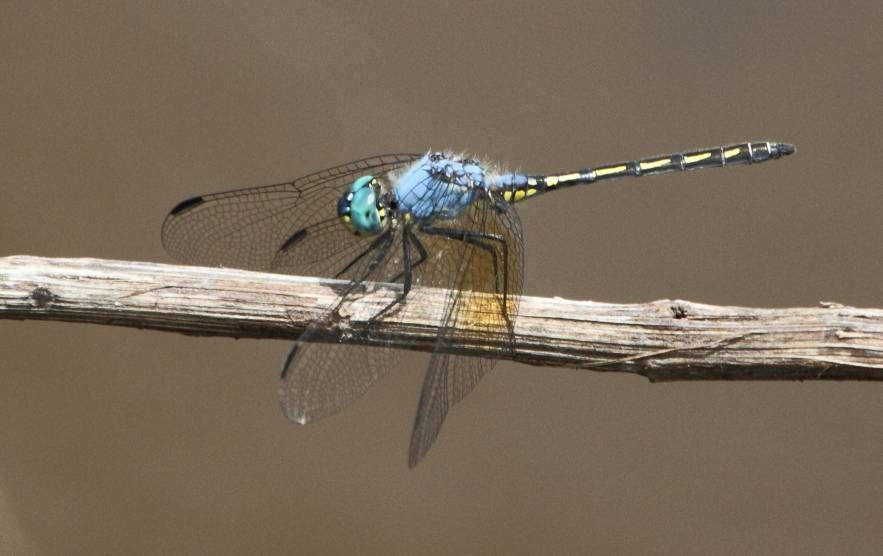
- Male

Conservation status
- Least Concern (IUCN 3.1)

Scientific classification
- Kingdom: Animalia
- Phylum: Arthropoda
- Class: Insecta
- Order: Odonata
- Infraorder: Anisoptera
- Family: Libellulidae
- Genus: Trithemis
- Species: T. stictica

Binomial name
- Trithemis stictica (Burmeister, 1839)

= Trithemis stictica =

Species of dragonfly

Trithemis stictica, the Jaunty Dropwing, is a species of dragonfly in the family Libellulidae.

== Distribution ==
It is found in Angola, Botswana, Cameroon, the Democratic Republic of the Congo, Ivory Coast, Ethiopia, Ghana, Guinea, Kenya, Liberia, Madagascar, Malawi, Mozambique, Namibia, Nigeria, Sierra Leone, Somalia, South Africa, Sudan, Tanzania, Uganda, Zambia, Zimbabwe, and possibly Burundi.

== Habitat ==
Its natural habitats are subtropical or tropical moist lowland forests, subtropical or tropical dry shrubland, subtropical or tropical moist shrubland, rivers, intermittent rivers, and freshwater marshes.

== Gallery ==
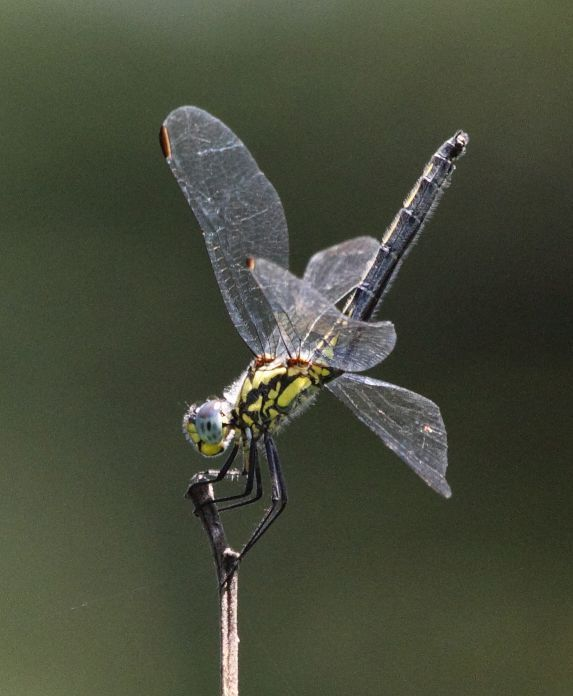
Female Jaunty Dropwing
