= Trithemis pruinata =

Conservation status
- Least Concern (IUCN 3.1)

Scientific classification
- Kingdom: Animalia
- Phylum: Arthropoda
- Class: Insecta
- Order: Odonata
- Infraorder: Anisoptera
- Family: Libellulidae
- Genus: Trithemis
- Species: T. pruinata

Binomial name
- Trithemis pruinata Karsch, 1899

Species of dragonfly

Trithemis pruinata is a species of dragonfly in the family Libellulidae. It is found in Cameroon, the Democratic Republic of the Congo, Ivory Coast, Gabon, Ghana, Guinea, Kenya, Nigeria, Tanzania, Togo, Uganda, and Zambia. Its natural habitats are subtropical or tropical moist lowland forests and rivers.
