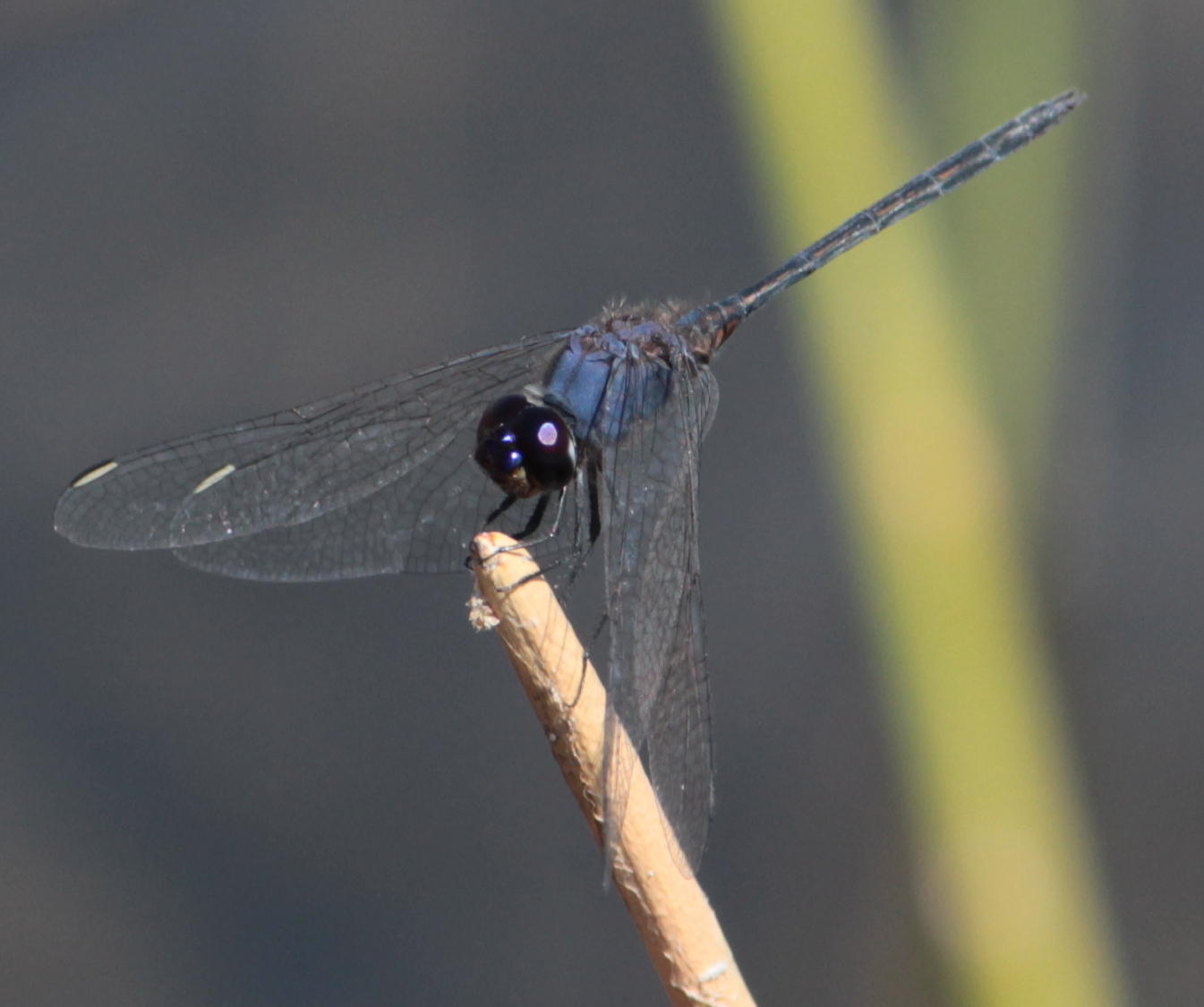
- Male
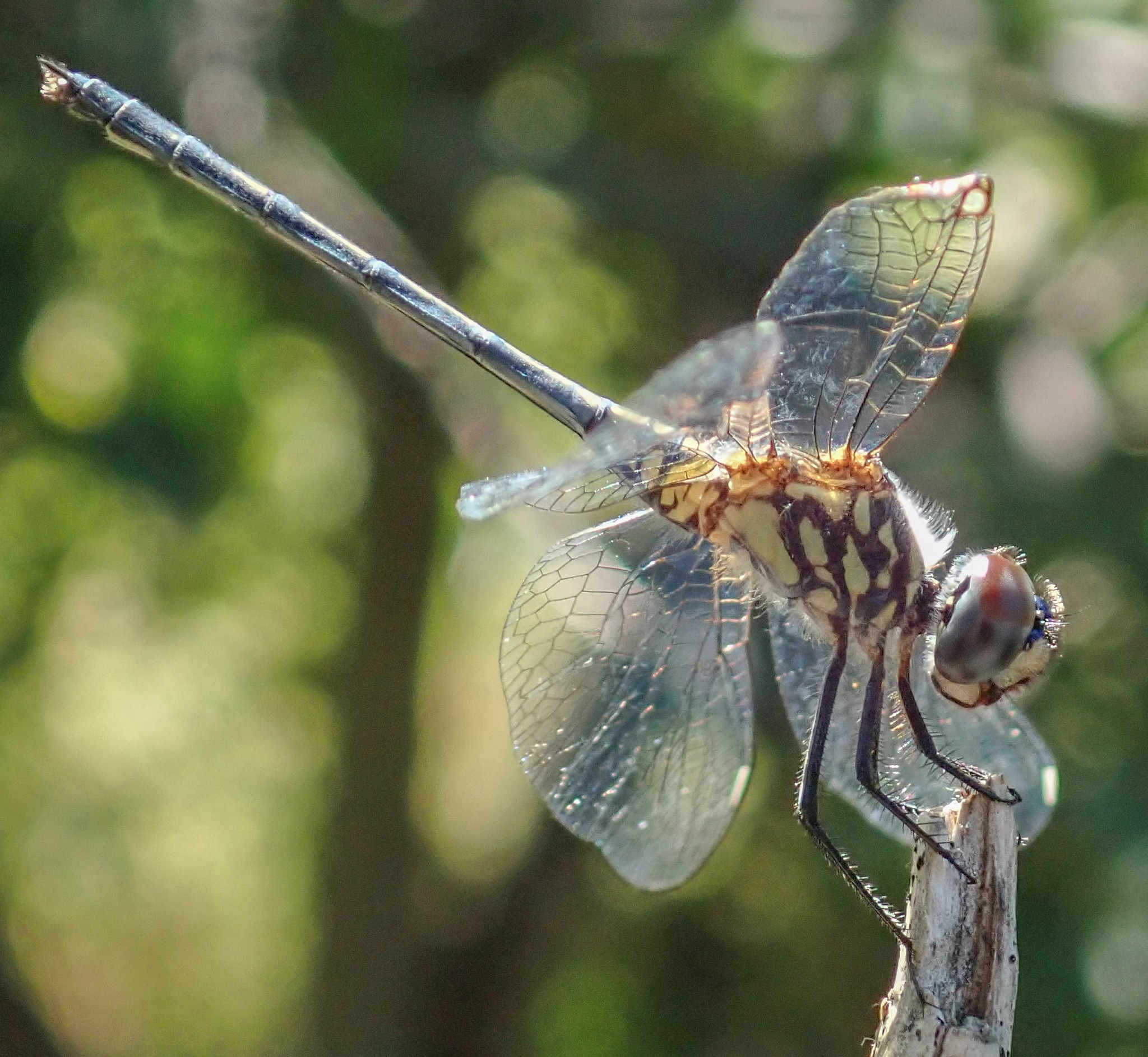
- Female

Conservation status
- Least Concern (IUCN 3.1)

Scientific classification
- Kingdom: Animalia
- Phylum: Arthropoda
- Class: Insecta
- Order: Odonata
- Infraorder: Anisoptera
- Family: Libellulidae
- Genus: Trithemis
- Species: T. hecate

Binomial name
- Trithemis hecate Ris, 1912

= Trithemis hecate =

Species of dragonfly

Trithemis hecate is a species of dragonfly in the family Libellulidae. It is found in Botswana, Chad, the Democratic Republic of the Congo, Gambia, Guinea, Kenya, Liberia, Madagascar, Malawi, Mozambique, Namibia, Senegal, South Africa, Tanzania, Uganda, Zambia, Zimbabwe, and possibly Burundi. Its natural habitats are subtropical or tropical moist lowland forests, dry savanna, moist savanna, subtropical or tropical dry shrubland, subtropical or tropical moist shrubland, and rivers.
