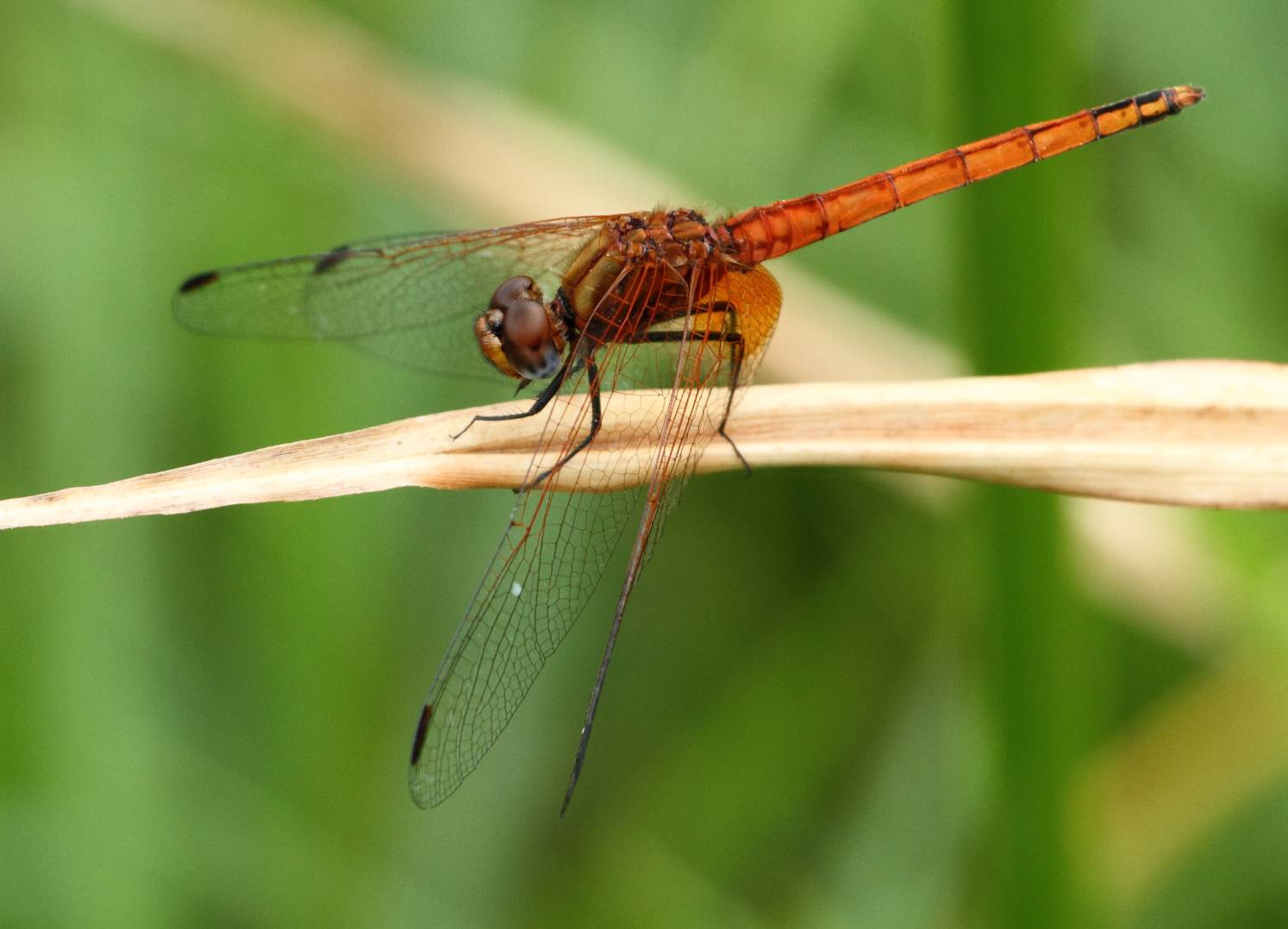
- Male

Conservation status
- Least Concern (IUCN 3.1)

Scientific classification
- Kingdom: Animalia
- Phylum: Arthropoda
- Class: Insecta
- Order: Odonata
- Infraorder: Anisoptera
- Family: Libellulidae
- Genus: Trithemis
- Species: T. pluvialis

Binomial name
- Trithemis pluvialis Förster, 1906

= Trithemis pluvialis =

Species of dragonfly

Trithemis pluvialis, the russet dropwing (also known as river dropwing), is a species of dragonfly in the family Libellulidae. It occurs in Africa south of Kenya.

== Description ==
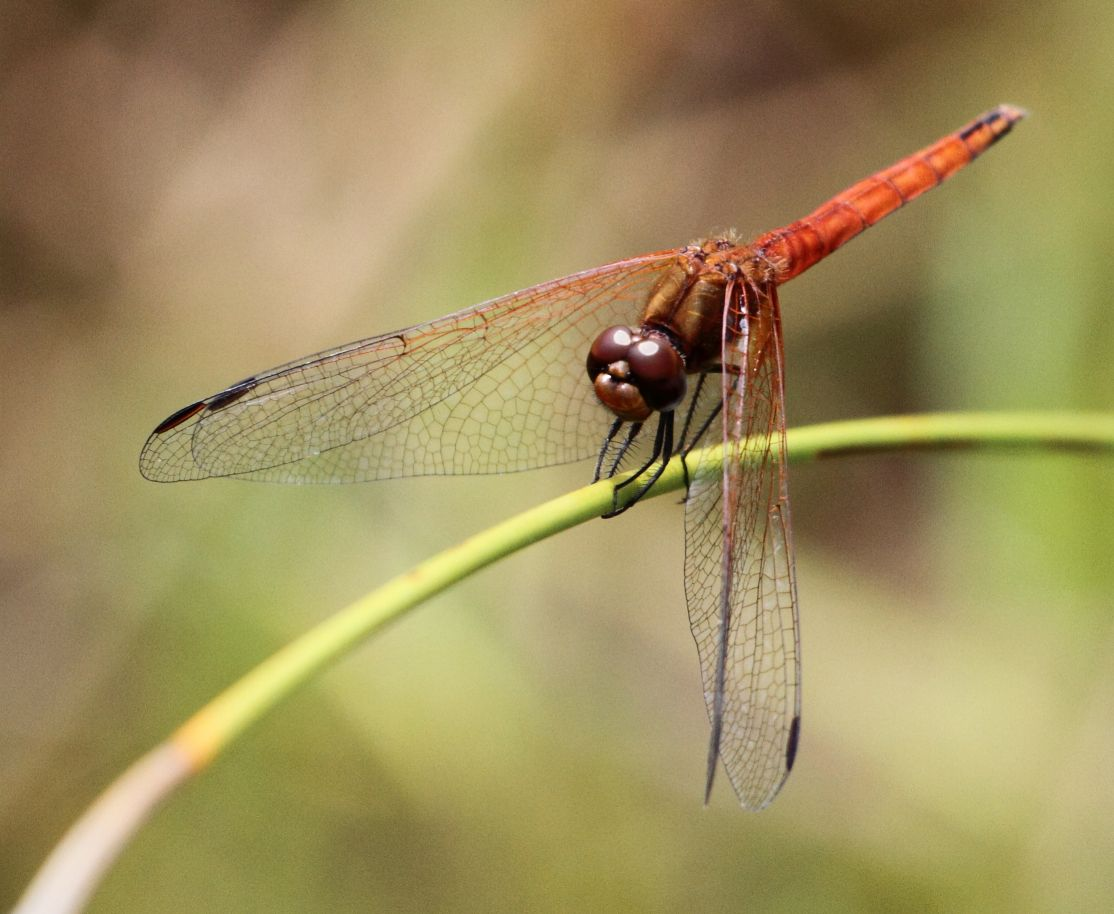
Mature male

The russet dropwing is a medium-sized dragonfly with a bright orange to reddish colouration and small orange patches on the hindwings. The abdomen shows small black dorsal stripes. The eyes are brownish orange. The female is stouter than the male and more mottled. The species often perches conspicuously on reeds or sedges.

== Distribution ==
It is found in Angola, Cameroon, the Republic of the Congo, the Democratic Republic of the Congo, Kenya, Malawi, Mozambique, Namibia, South Africa, Tanzania, Zambia, and Zimbabwe. This dragonfly prefers swift rocky rivers with extensive reed margins in savanna habitats.

== Conservation ==
The species is widely spread and populations do not appear to be declining, although like many dragonflies it is likely being impacted by water pollution, drainage and habitat loss through agricultural expansion and intensification.
