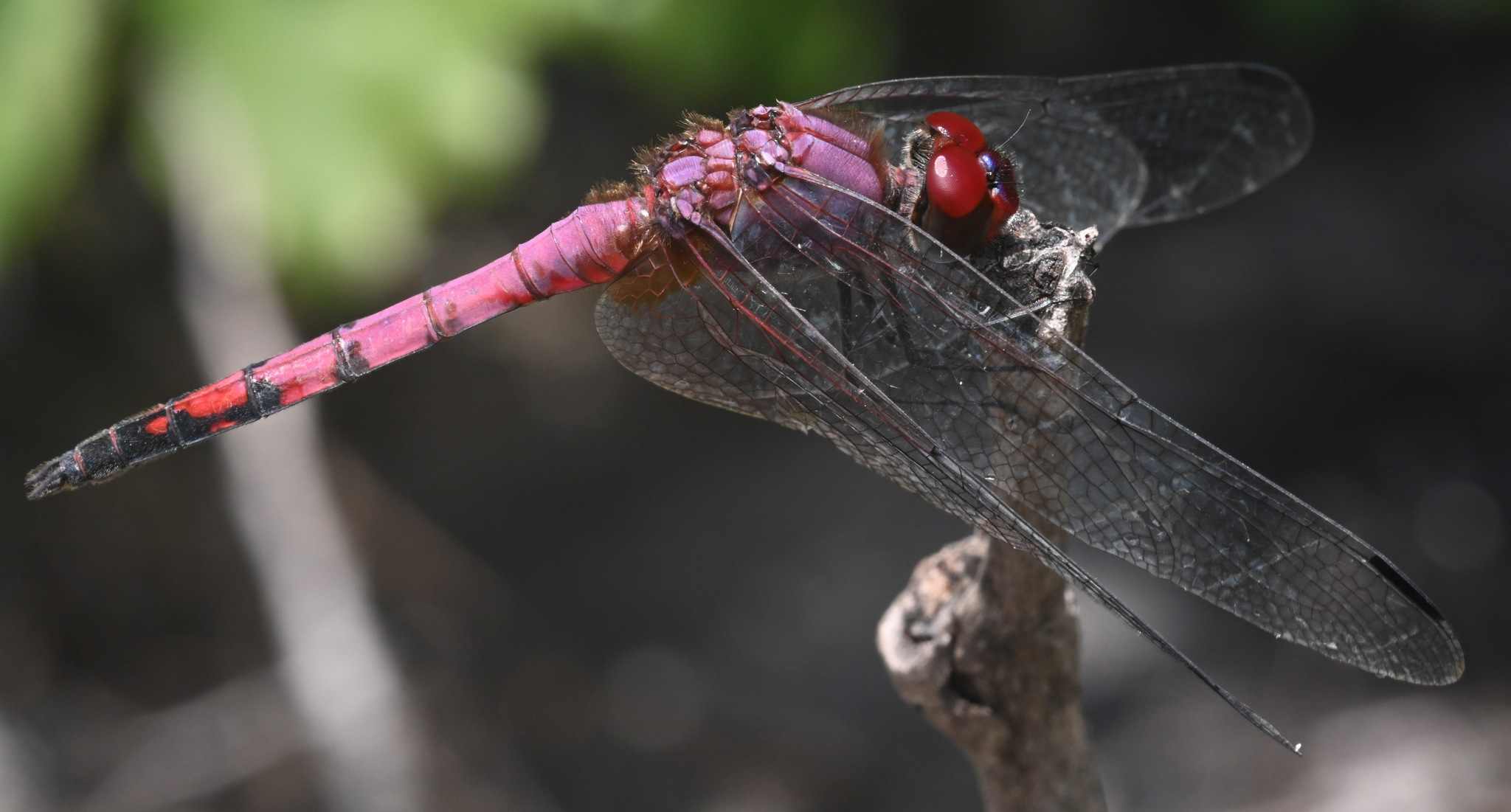
- Trithemis hartwigi male in Angola

Conservation status
- Least Concern (IUCN 3.1)

Scientific classification
- Kingdom: Animalia
- Phylum: Arthropoda
- Clade: Pancrustacea
- Class: Insecta
- Order: Odonata
- Infraorder: Anisoptera
- Superfamily: Libelluloidea
- Family: Libellulidae
- Genus: Trithemis
- Species: T. hartwigi

Binomial name
- Trithemis hartwigi Pinhey, 1970

= Trithemis hartwigi =

Species of dragonfly

Trithemis hartwigi is a species of dragonfly in the family Libellulidae. It is found in Cameroon and Equatorial Guinea. Its natural habitat is subtropical or tropical moist lowland forests.
