= Trithemis ellenbeckii =

Conservation status
- Least Concern (IUCN 3.1)

Scientific classification
- Kingdom: Animalia
- Phylum: Arthropoda
- Class: Insecta
- Order: Odonata
- Infraorder: Anisoptera
- Family: Libellulidae
- Genus: Trithemis
- Species: T. ellenbeckii

Binomial name
- Trithemis ellenbeckii Förster, 1906

Species of dragonfly

Trithemis ellenbeckii is a species of dragonfly in the family Libellulidae. It is endemic to Ethiopia. Its natural habitats are subtropical or tropical high-altitude grassland and rivers. It is threatened by habitat loss.
