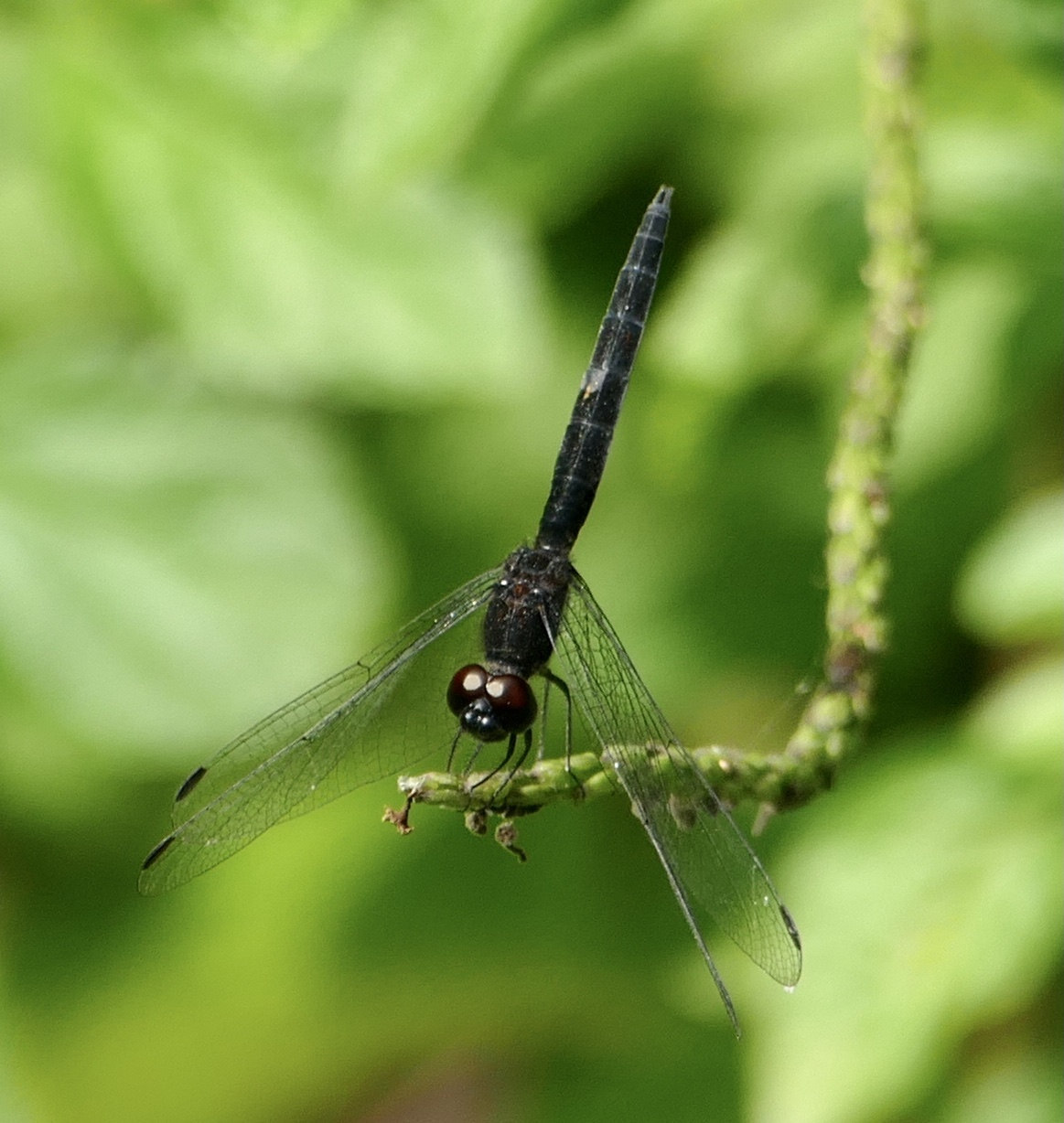
- Male in Ghana

Conservation status
- Least Concern (IUCN 3.1)

Scientific classification
- Kingdom: Animalia
- Phylum: Arthropoda
- Clade: Pancrustacea
- Class: Insecta
- Order: Odonata
- Infraorder: Anisoptera
- Superfamily: Libelluloidea
- Family: Libellulidae
- Genus: Trithemis
- Species: T. dichroa

Binomial name
- Trithemis dichroa Karsch, 1893

= Trithemis dichroa =

Species of dragonfly

Trithemis dichroa, the Small Dropwing, is a species of dragonfly in the family Libellulidae. It is found in Angola, Benin, Cameroon, Central African Republic, the Democratic Republic of the Congo, Ivory Coast, Equatorial Guinea, Ghana, Guinea, Liberia, Mali, Nigeria, Sierra Leone, Sudan, Togo, Uganda, and Zambia. Its natural habitats are subtropical or tropical moist lowland forests, rivers, and freshwater marshes.
