= Trithemis imitata =

Conservation status
- Least Concern (IUCN 3.1)

Scientific classification
- Kingdom: Animalia
- Phylum: Arthropoda
- Class: Insecta
- Order: Odonata
- Infraorder: Anisoptera
- Family: Libellulidae
- Genus: Trithemis
- Species: T. imitata

Binomial name
- Trithemis imitata Pinhey, 1961

Species of dragonfly

Trithemis imitata is a species of dragonfly in the family Libellulidae. It is found in the Democratic Republic of the Congo and Uganda. Its natural habitats are subtropical or tropical moist lowland forests and intermittent rivers.
