= Trithemis aequalis =

Conservation status
- Near Threatened (IUCN 3.1)

Scientific classification
- Kingdom: Animalia
- Phylum: Arthropoda
- Clade: Pancrustacea
- Class: Insecta
- Order: Odonata
- Infraorder: Anisoptera
- Family: Libellulidae
- Genus: Trithemis
- Species: T. aequalis

Binomial name
- Trithemis aequalis Lieftinck, 1969

Species of dragonfly

Trithemis aequalis is a species of dragonfly in the family Libellulidae. It is found in Botswana, Namibia, and Zambia.
