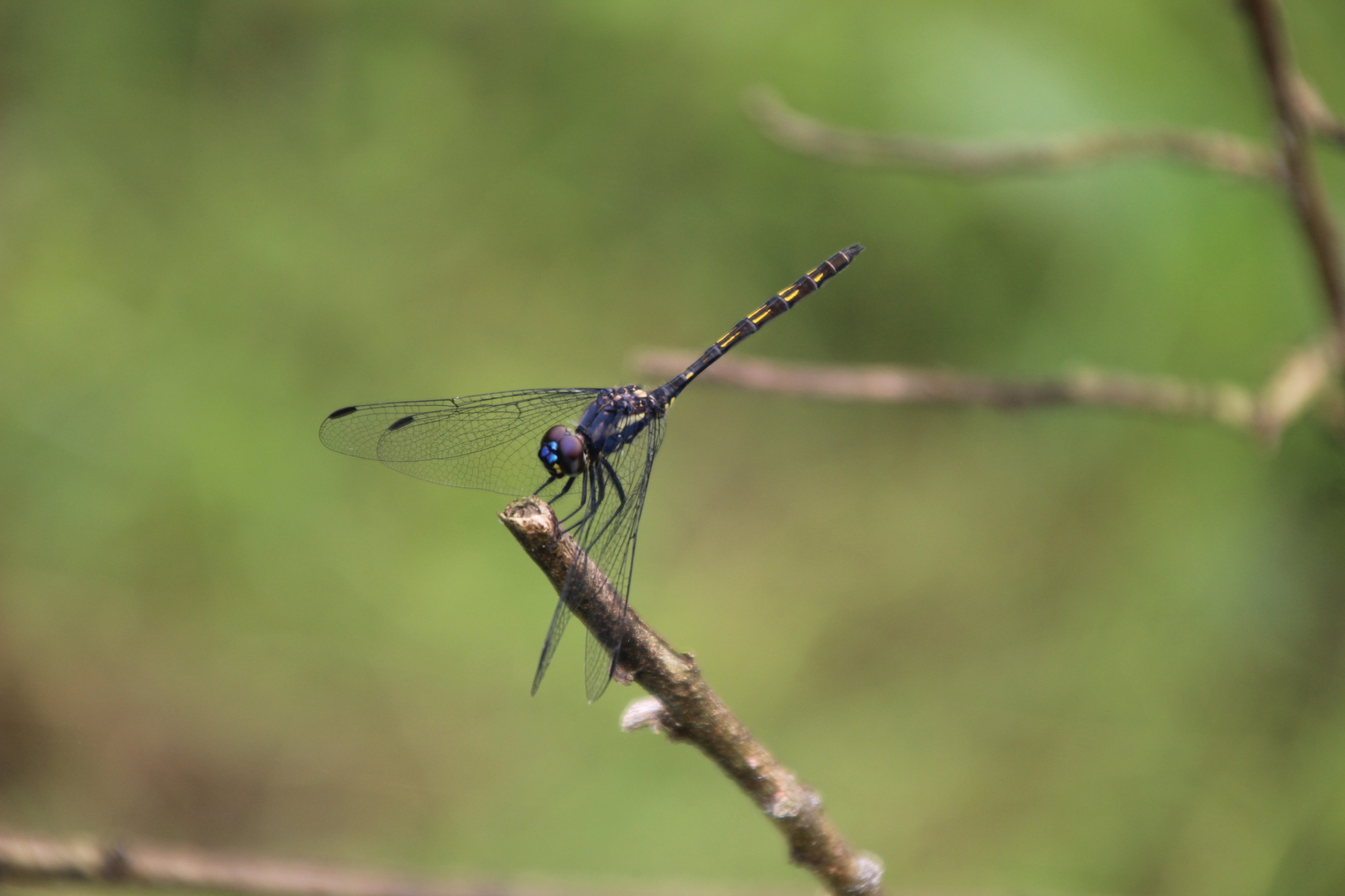
- Male in Uganda

Conservation status
- Least Concern (IUCN 3.1)

Scientific classification
- Kingdom: Animalia
- Phylum: Arthropoda
- Clade: Pancrustacea
- Class: Insecta
- Order: Odonata
- Infraorder: Anisoptera
- Superfamily: Libelluloidea
- Family: Libellulidae
- Genus: Trithemis
- Species: T. nuptialis

Binomial name
- Trithemis nuptialis Karsch, 1894

= Trithemis nuptialis =

Species of dragonfly

Trithemis nuptialis is a species of dragonfly in the family Libellulidae. It is found in Angola, Cameroon, Central African Republic, the Republic of the Congo, the Democratic Republic of the Congo, Ivory Coast, Equatorial Guinea, Gabon, Guinea, Liberia, Niger, Nigeria, Sierra Leone, Tanzania, Uganda, and Zambia. Its natural habitats are subtropical or tropical moist lowland forests and rivers.
