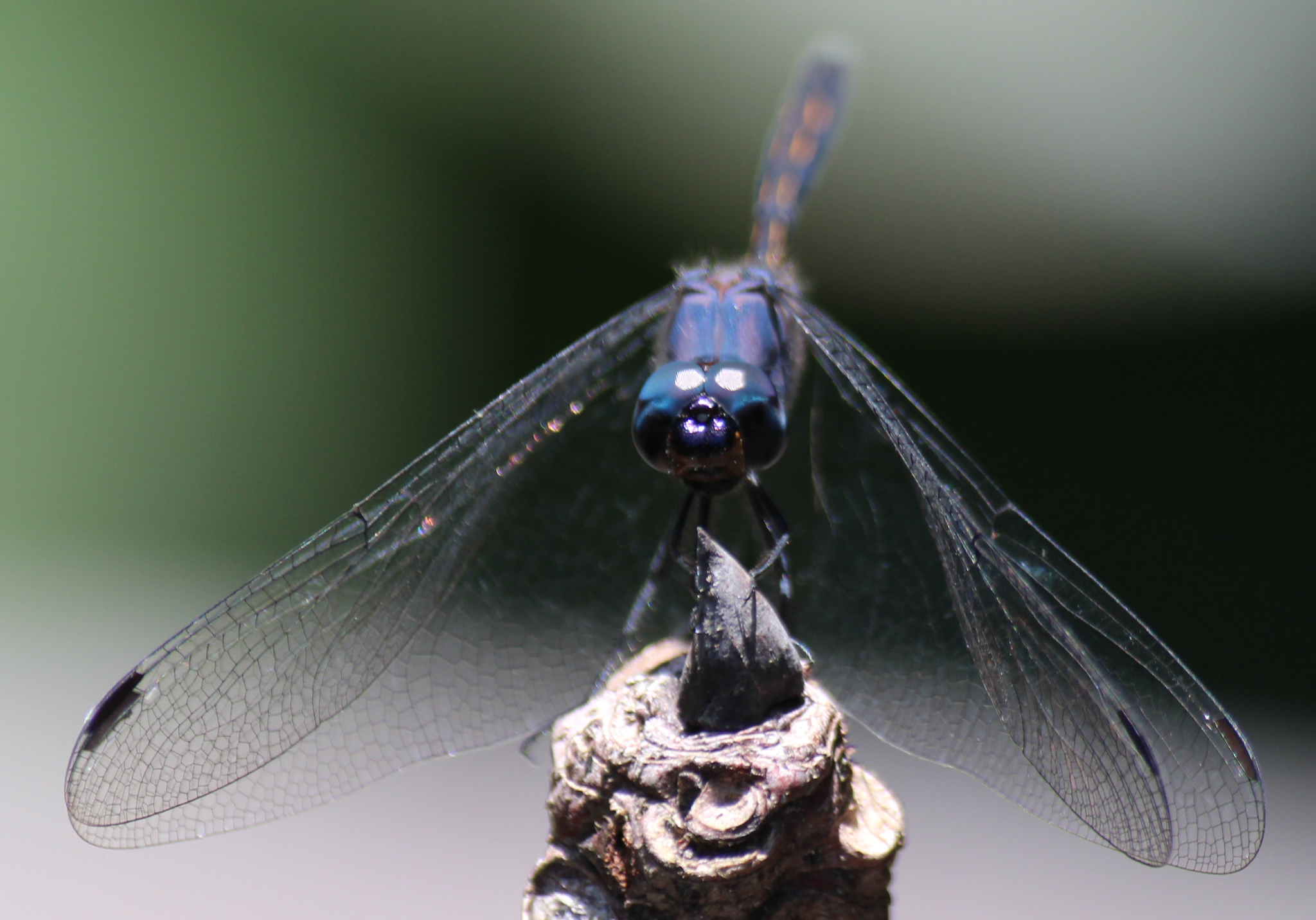

Conservation status
- Least Concern (IUCN 3.1)

Scientific classification
- Kingdom: Animalia
- Phylum: Arthropoda
- Clade: Pancrustacea
- Class: Insecta
- Order: Odonata
- Infraorder: Anisoptera
- Family: Libellulidae
- Genus: Trithemis
- Species: T. aconita

Binomial name
- Trithemis aconita Lieftinck, 1969

= Trithemis aconita =

Species of dragonfly

Trithemis aconita, the halfshade dropwing, is a species of dragonfly in the family Libellulidae. It is found in Benin, Botswana, Cameroon, Ivory Coast, Equatorial Guinea, Ethiopia, Ghana, Guinea, Kenya, Liberia, Malawi, Mozambique, Namibia, Nigeria, South Africa, Tanzania, Togo, Uganda, Zambia, Zimbabwe, and possibly Burundi. Its natural habitats are subtropical or tropical moist lowland forests and rivers.
