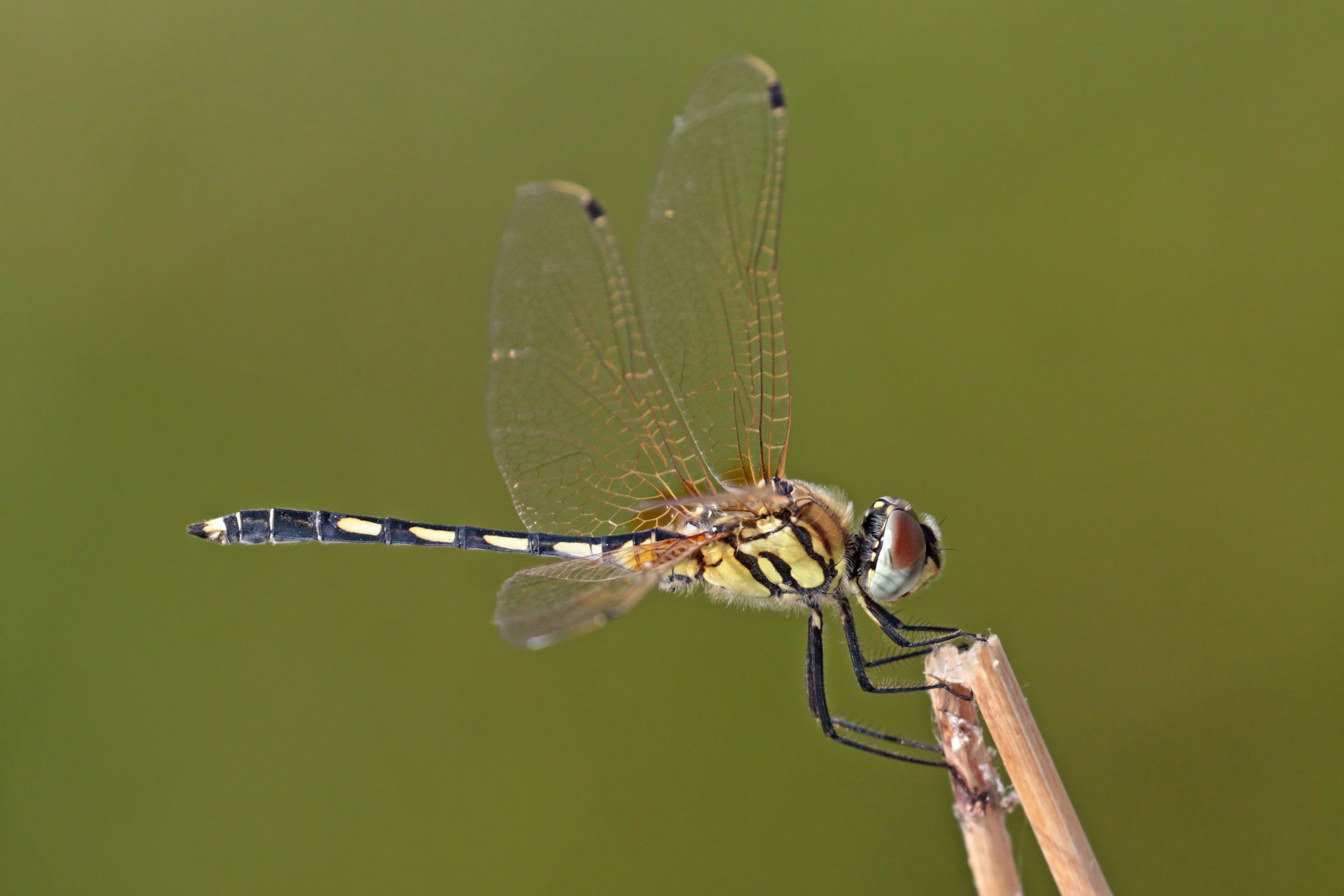
- Male in Rajasthan, India

Conservation status
- Least Concern (IUCN 3.1)

Scientific classification
- Kingdom: Animalia
- Phylum: Arthropoda
- Class: Insecta
- Order: Odonata
- Infraorder: Anisoptera
- Family: Libellulidae
- Genus: Trithemis
- Species: T. pallidinervis

Binomial name
- Trithemis pallidinervis (Kirby, 1889)

= Long-legged marsh glider =

Species of dragonfly

The long-legged marsh glider or dancing dropwing (Trithemis pallidinervis) is a species of dragonfly found in Asia.

== Description ==
The long-legged marsh glider is a medium-sized yellowish brown dragonfly with long legs. In males, the face is yellow or pale brown in front and iridescent purple above. The eyes are colored reddish brown above, brown on sides and bluish grey below. The thorax is olivaceous brown above with a dark brown triangle. On the sides, it is bright yellowish brown with three black stripes on each side. The legs are black, long, and spidery. The basal half of the femora of the first pair of legs are bright yellow. The wings are transparent with reddish venation. The forewings have amber basal markings. The wings have a golden sheen when viewed from certain angle. Wing spot is black with creamy white ends. The abdomen looks bright yellow in color with black median and lateral stripes. These stripes are confluent at the end of each abdominal segment to enclose a wedge shaped yellow spot. The male varies in colour from yellow (below) to chocolate brown when matured.

The females are similar to males but with a broad abdomen. The only way to distinguish the male from the female is the projection on segment two (secondary genital) and purple frons on the face.

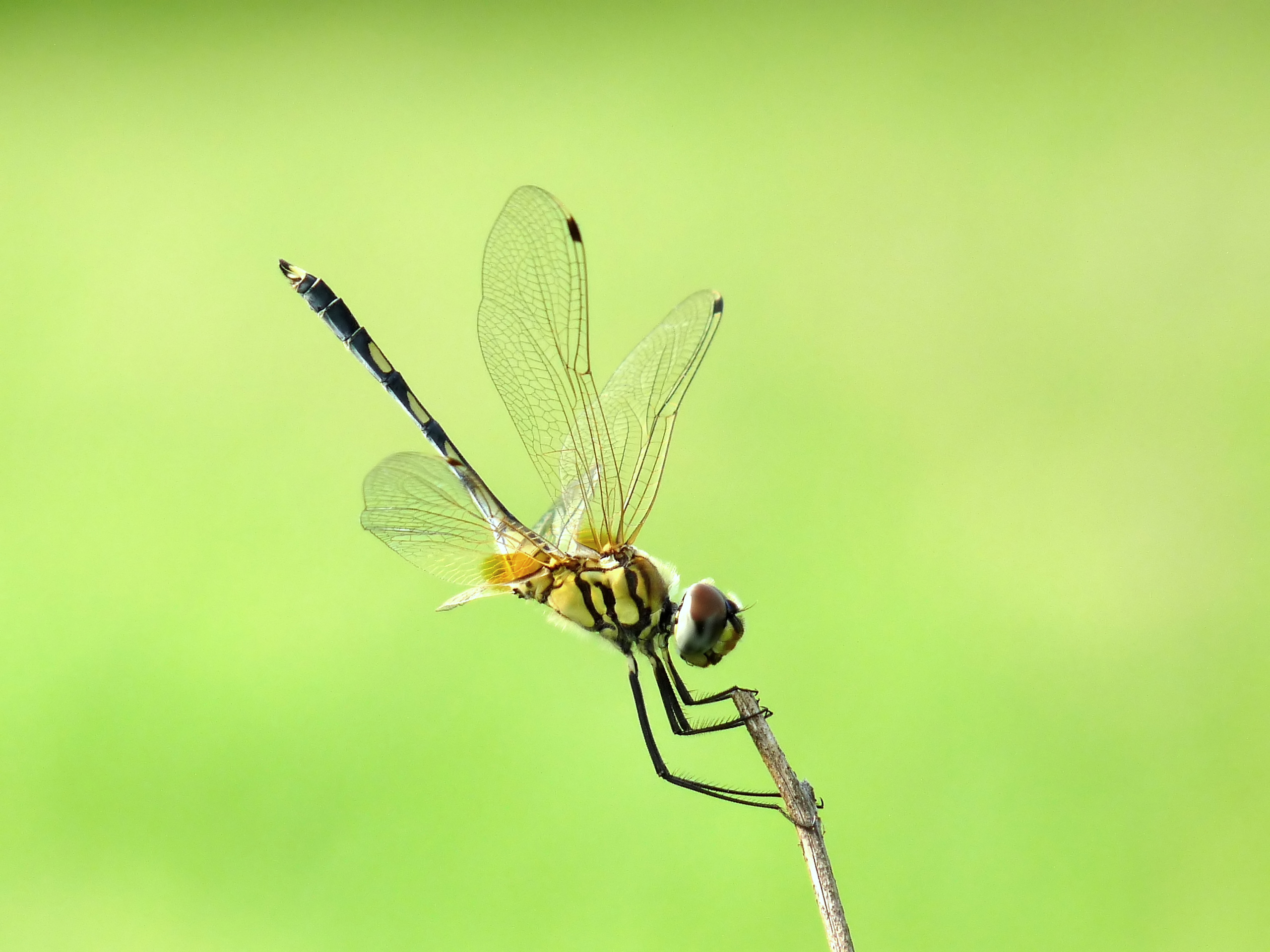
Male in Kerala, India

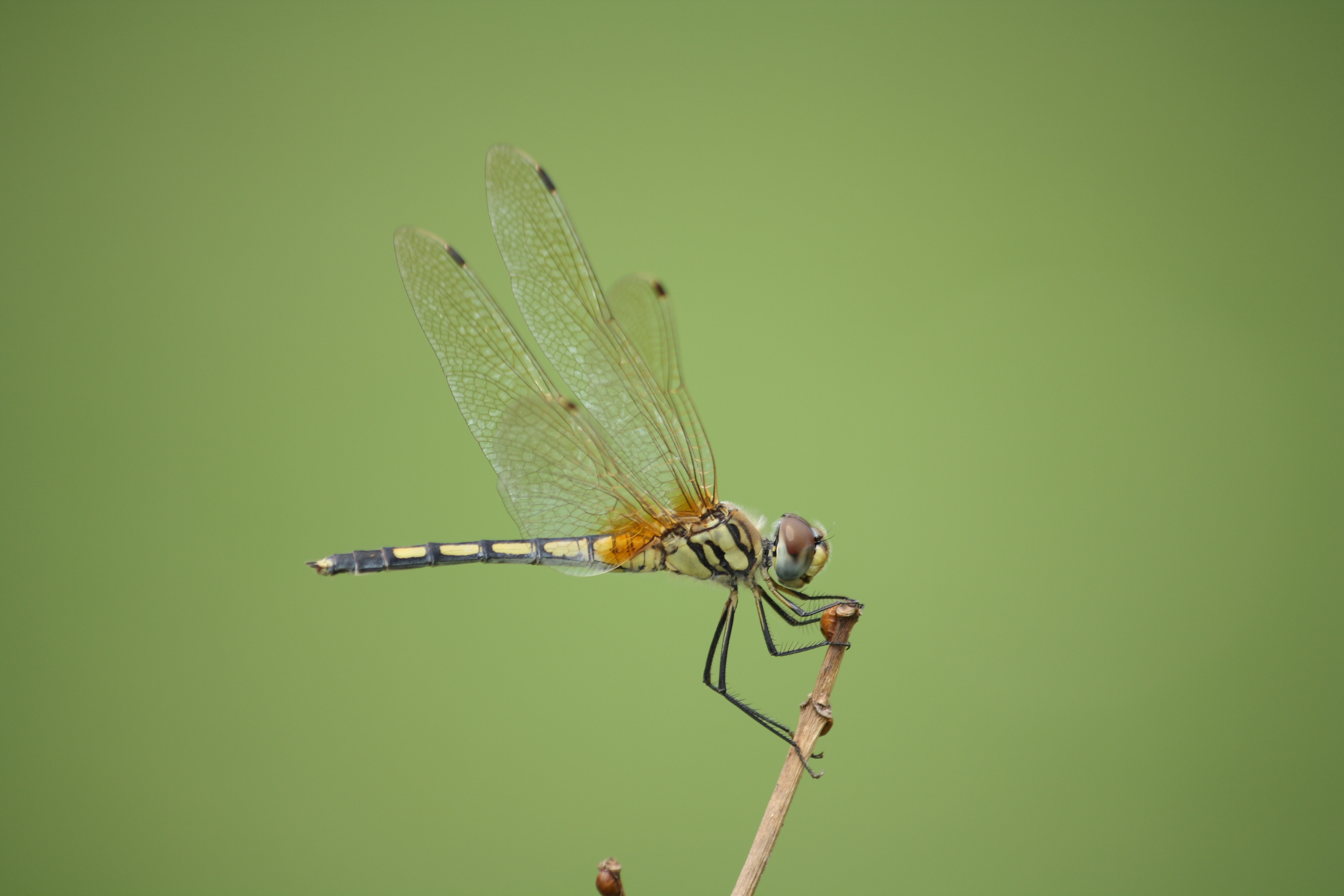
Female

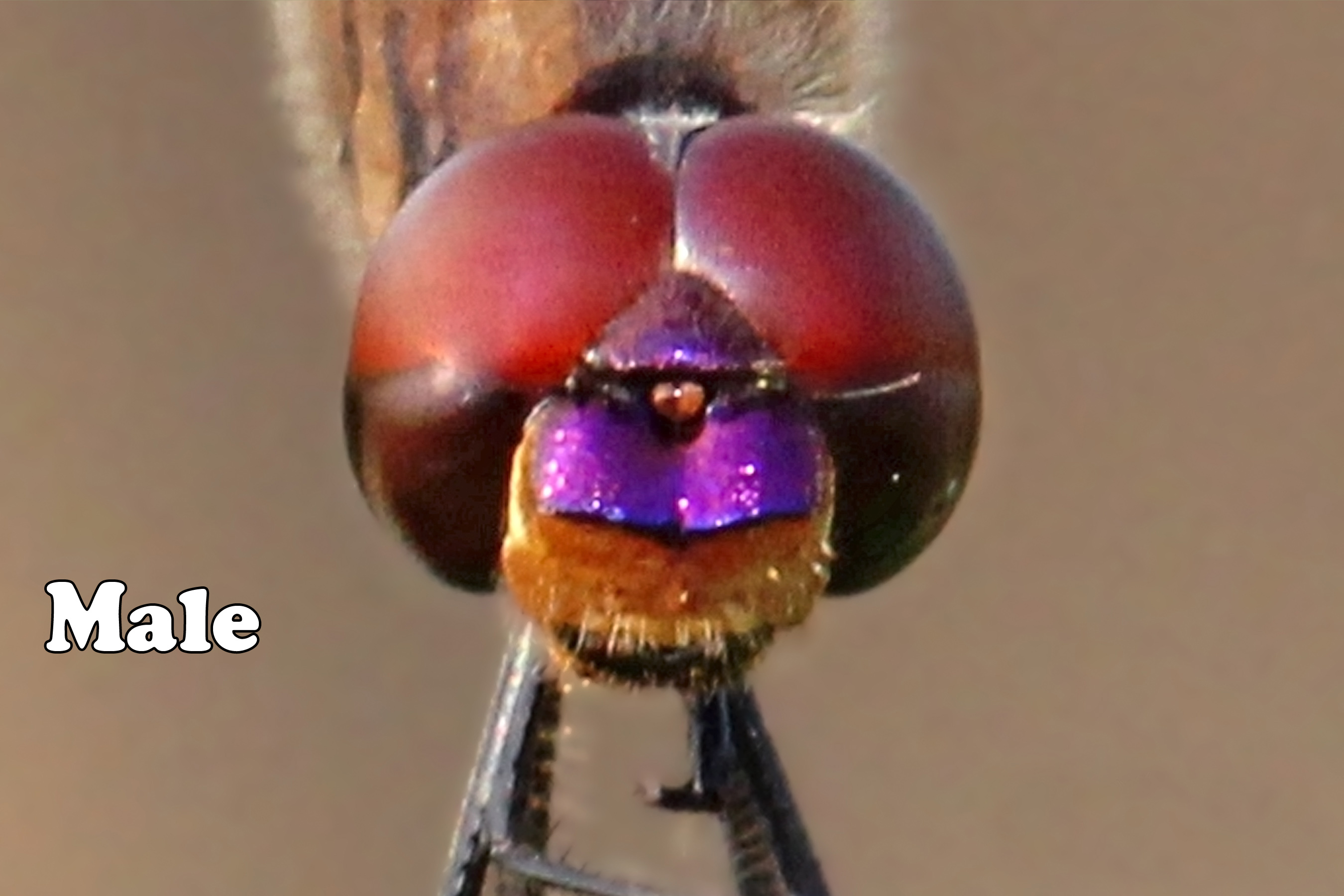
Male

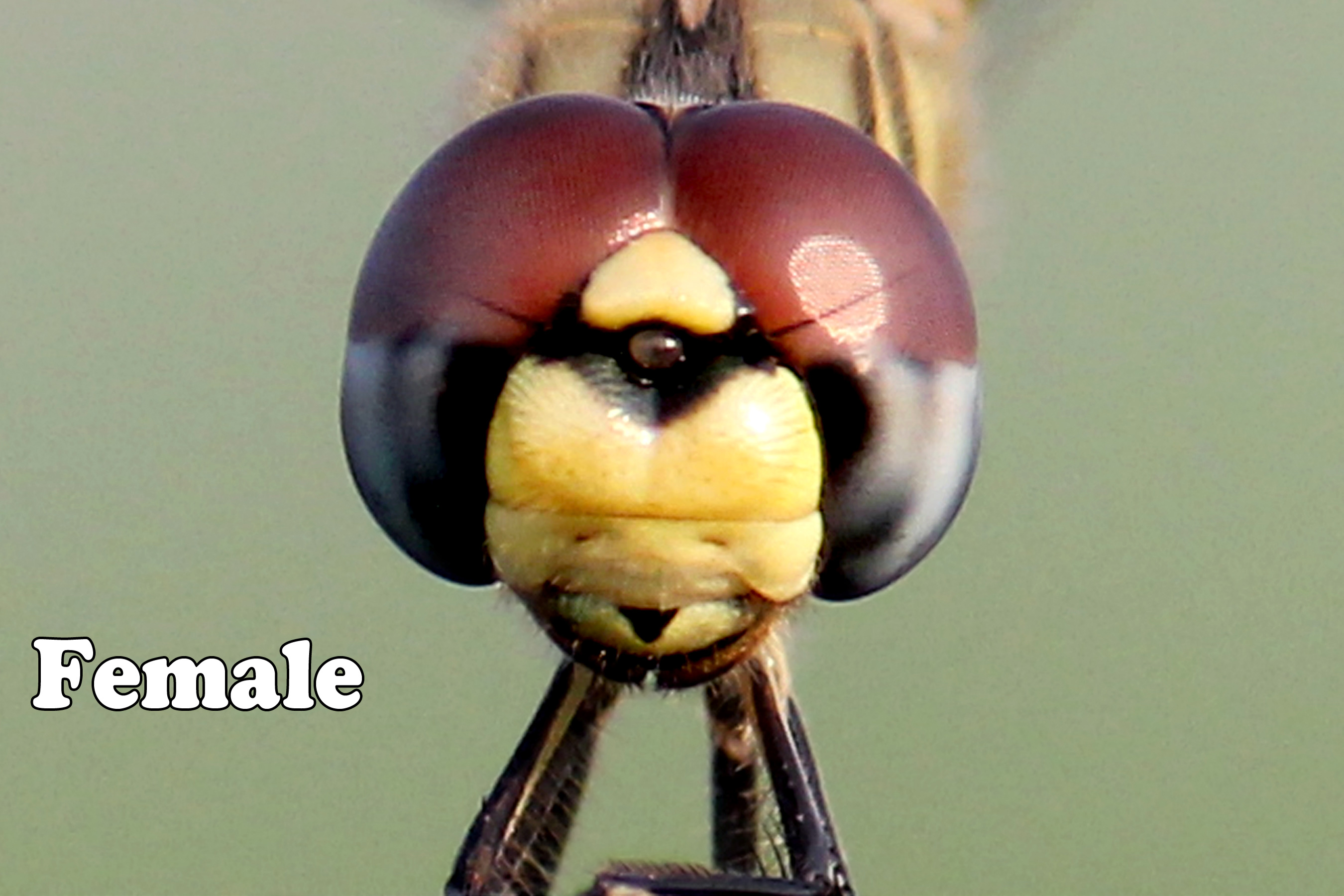
Female

== Habitat and behavior ==
This dragonfly is seen near marshes, weedy ponds and lakes where it breeds. It usually perches on tall aquatic weeds or bare ends of shrubs. The long legs are very clearly noticeable at this time. One of the most readily seen dragonflies due to its perching habit and up-winged posture, poised at the tip of swaying reeds.

== See also ==
- List of odonates of Sri Lanka
- List of odonates of India
- List of odonata of Kerala
