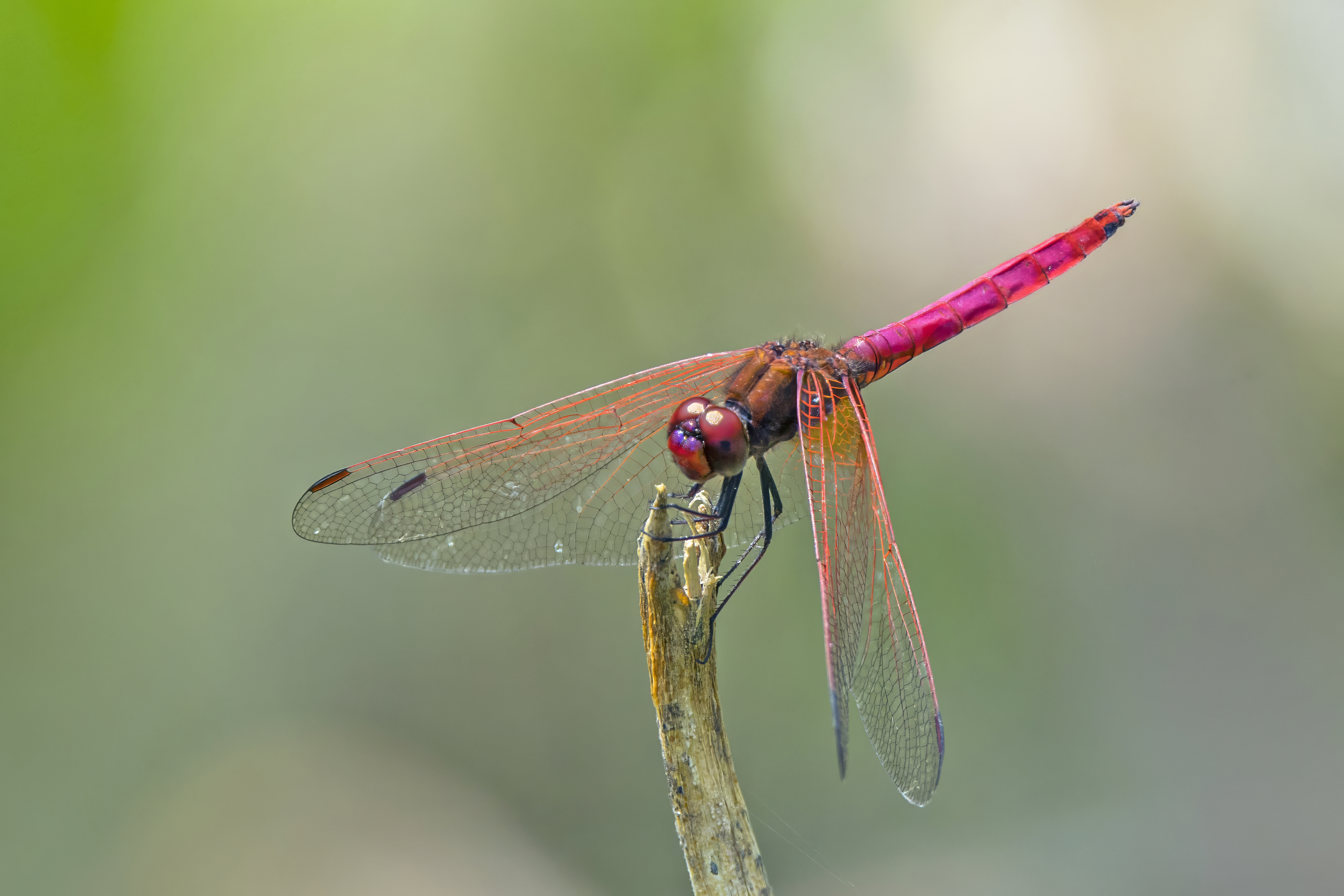
- Male
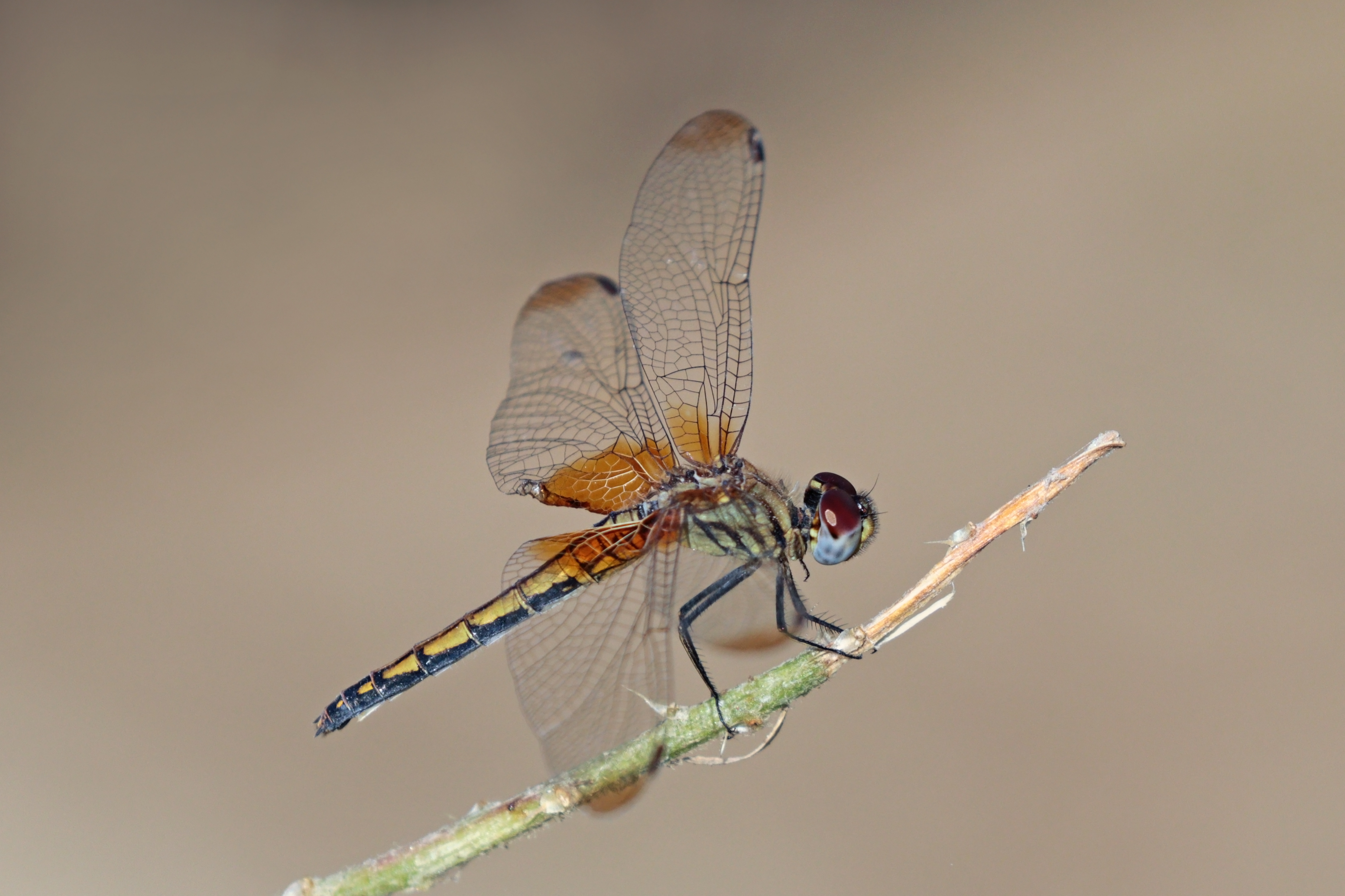
- Female

Conservation status
- Least Concern (IUCN 3.1)

Scientific classification
- Kingdom: Animalia
- Phylum: Arthropoda
- Clade: Pancrustacea
- Class: Insecta
- Order: Odonata
- Infraorder: Anisoptera
- Superfamily: Libelluloidea
- Family: Libellulidae
- Genus: Trithemis
- Species: T. aurora

Binomial name
- Trithemis aurora (Burmeister, 1839)

Synonyms
- Libellula aurora Burmeister, 1839; Trithemis soror Brauer, 1868; Trithemis fraterna Albarda, 1881; Trithemis congener Kirby, 1890; Crocothemis misrai Baijal & Agarwal, 1955

= Crimson marsh glider =

Species of dragonfly

Trithemis aurora, the crimson marsh glider, is a species of dragonfly in the family Libellulidae. It is a common and widely distributed species found throughout the year across the Indian subcontinent and Southeast Asia.

== Description ==
The male of this small species is distinctly different from the female. The male has a reddish-brown face, with eyes that are crimson above and brown on the sides. The thorax is red with a fine, purple pruinescence. The abdomen, the base of which is swollen, is crimson with a violet tinge. The wings are transparent with crimson venation and the base has a broad amber patch. The wing spots are a dark reddish-brown and the legs are black.

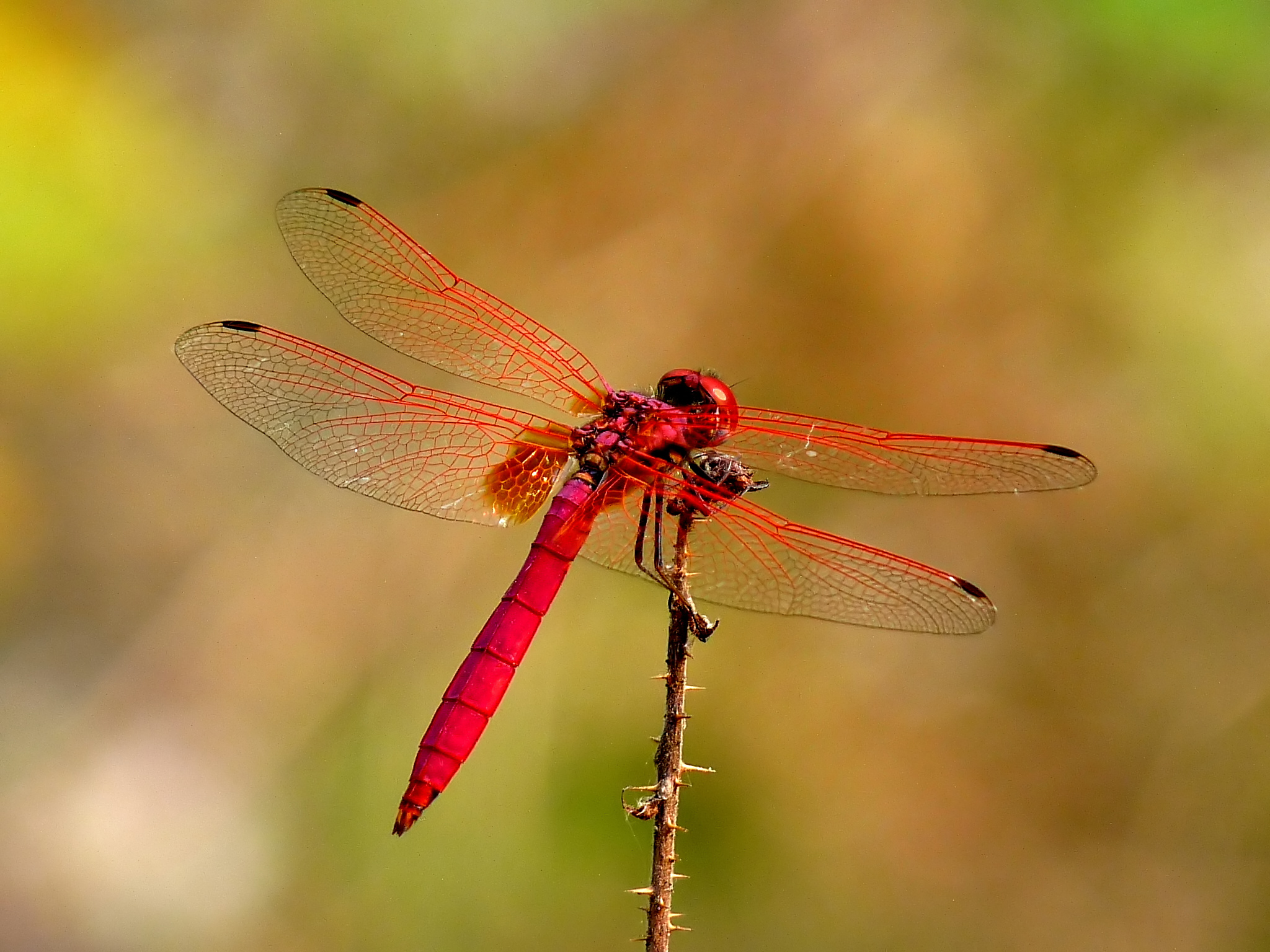
Male

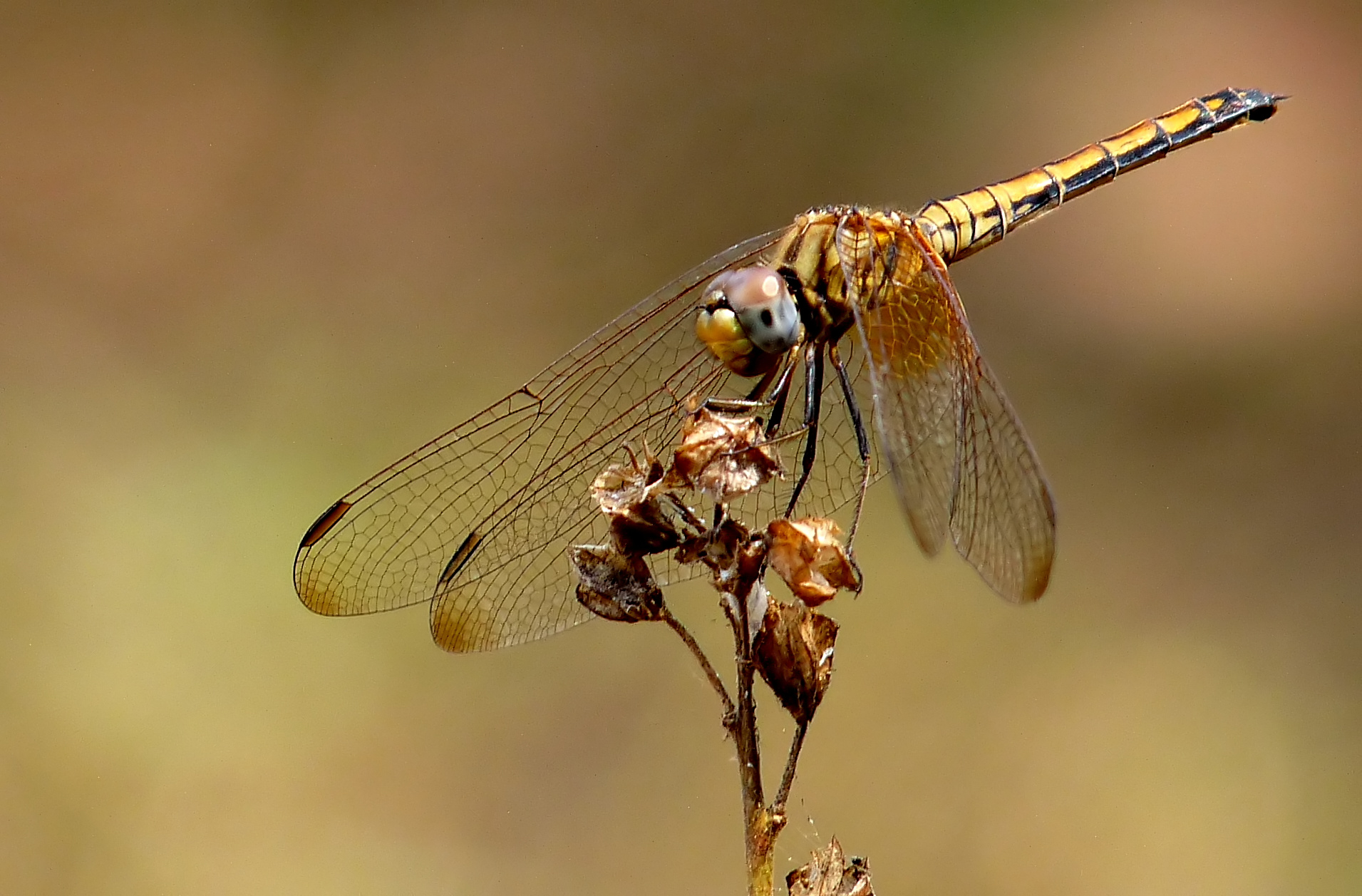
Female

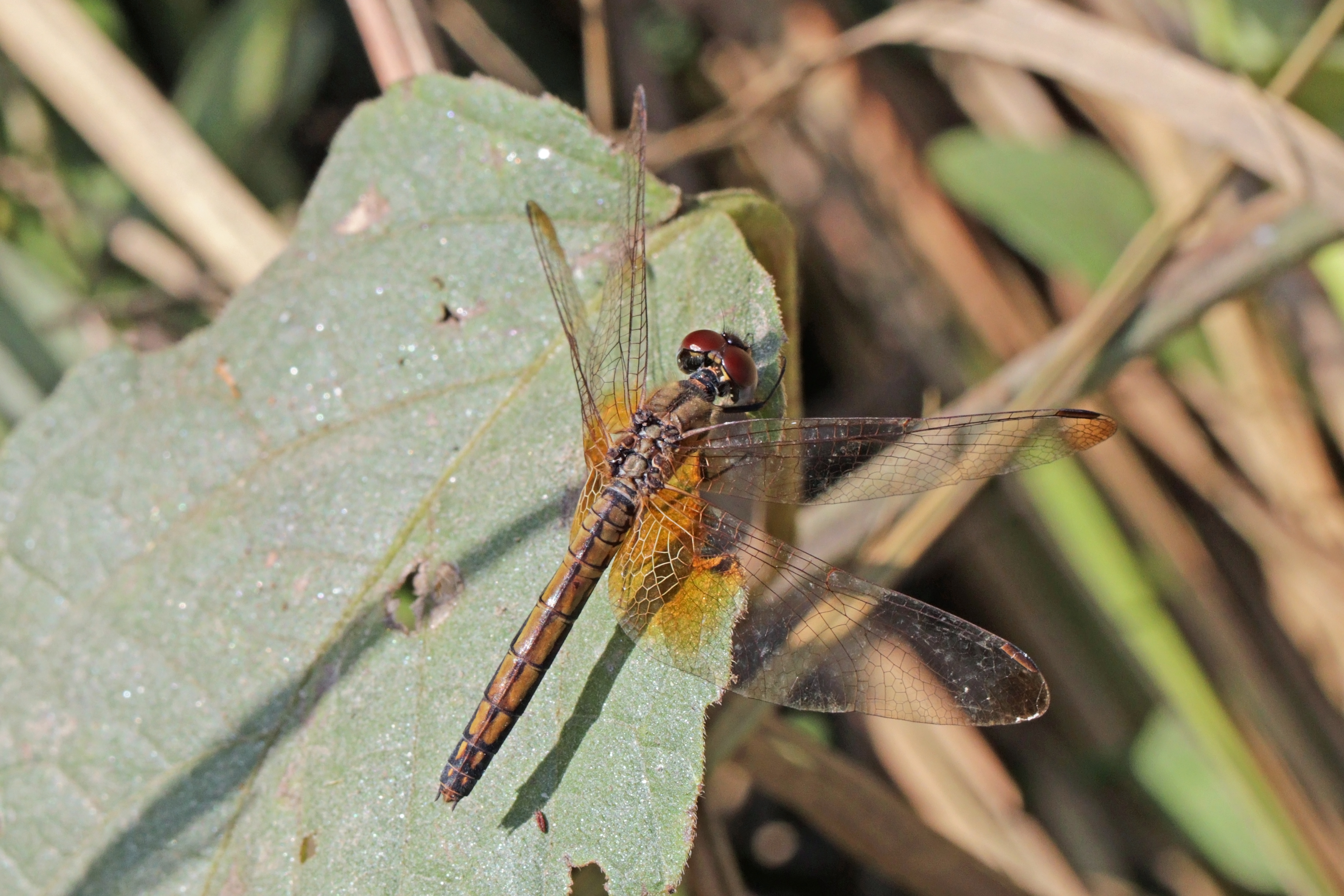
female

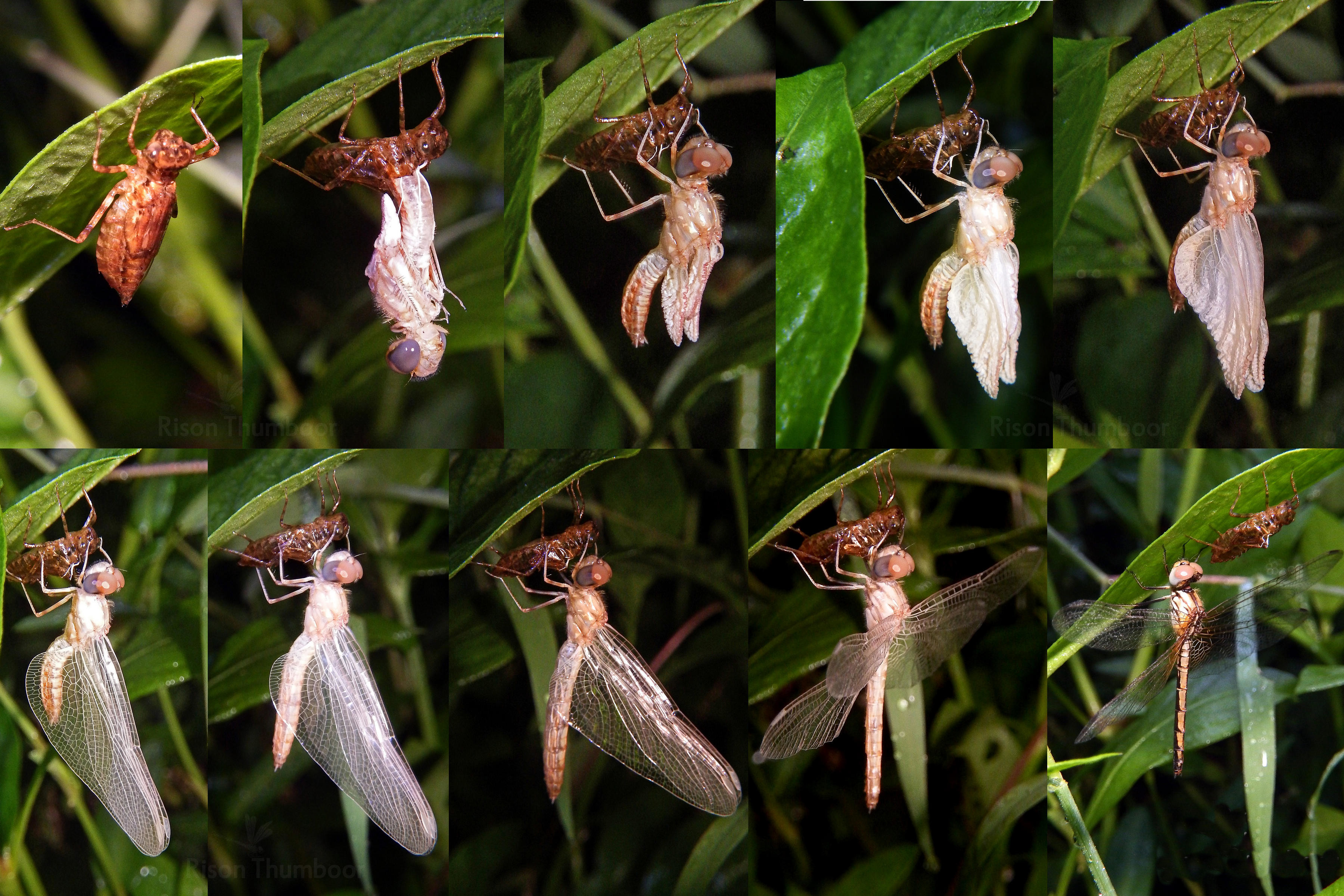
Emergence

The female has an olivaceous or bright reddish-brown face with eyes that are purplish-brown above and grey below. The thorax is olivaceous with brown median and black lateral stripes. The abdomen is reddish-brown with median and lateral black markings. The black markings are confluent at the end of each segment and enclose a reddish-brown spot. The wings are transparent with brown tips. The venation is bright yellow to brown and basal amber markings are pale. The wing spots are a dark brown and the lags are dark grey with narrow yellow stripes.

== Habitat ==
It is commonly found in weedy tanks and ponds, marshes, channels, and slow flowing streams and rivers in the lowlands and mid-hills. It breeds in streams, rivers, canals, ponds and tanks.

== Photo gallery ==
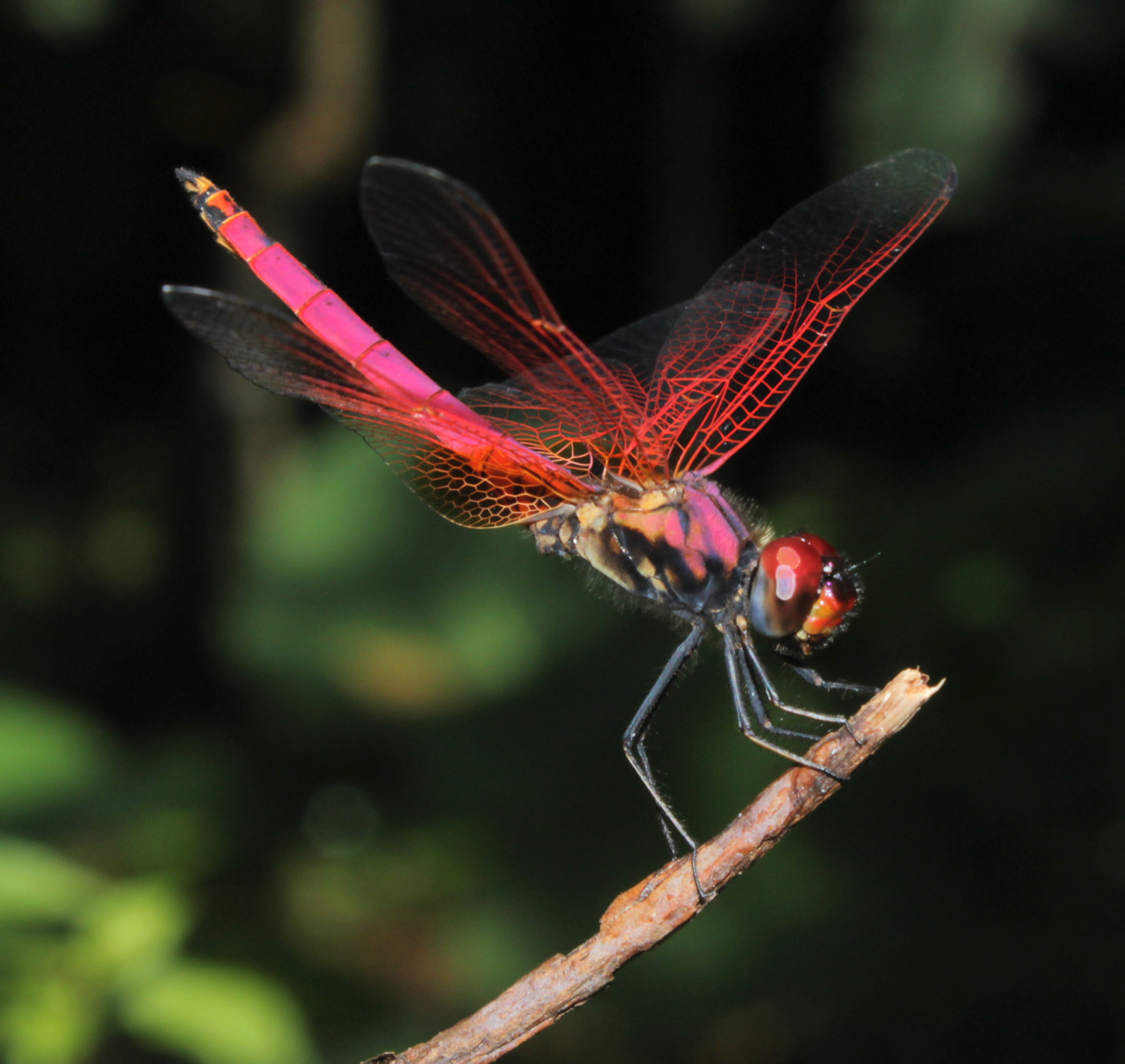
Male

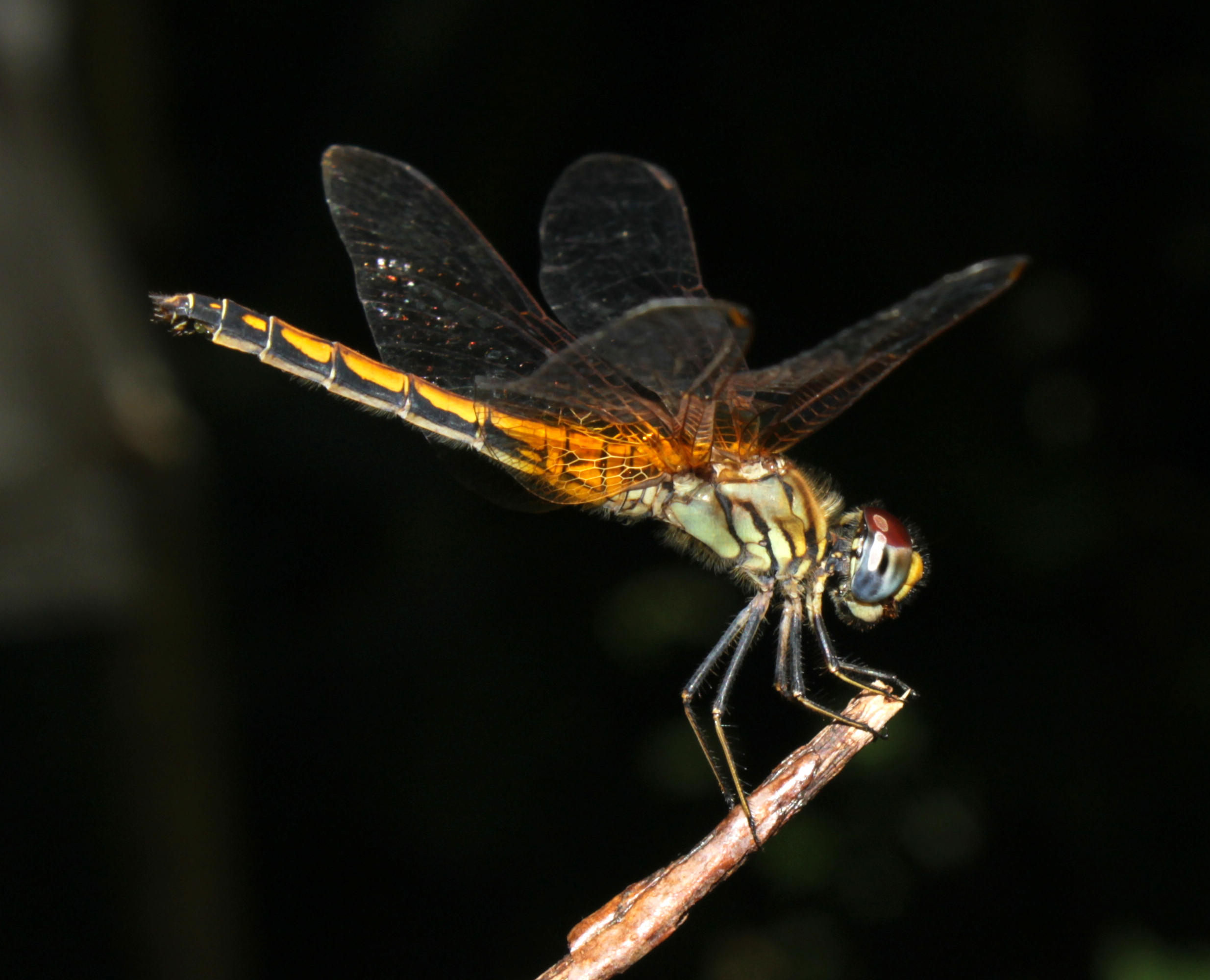
Female

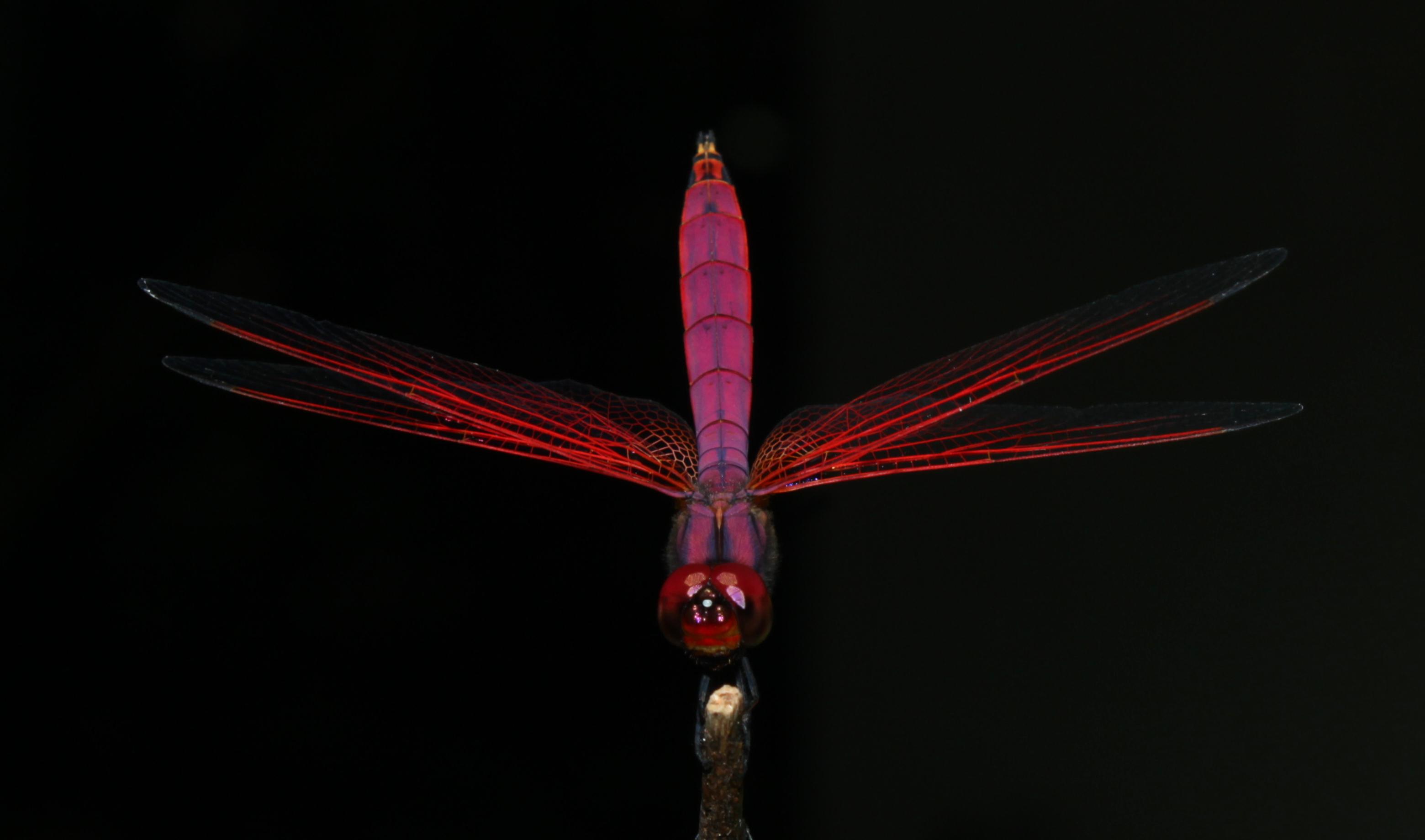
Male

== See also ==
- List of odonates of Sri Lanka
- List of odonates of India
- List of odonata of Kerala
