= Trithemis brydeni =

Conservation status
- Near Threatened (IUCN 3.1)

Scientific classification
- Kingdom: Animalia
- Phylum: Arthropoda
- Class: Insecta
- Order: Odonata
- Infraorder: Anisoptera
- Family: Libellulidae
- Genus: Trithemis
- Species: T. brydeni

Binomial name
- Trithemis brydeni Pinhey, 1970

Species of dragonfly

Trithemis brydeni is a species of dragonfly in the family Libellulidae. It is found in Botswana and Zambia. Its natural habitats are rivers and freshwater marshes.
