= Trithemis nigra =

Conservation status
- Near Threatened (IUCN 3.1)

Scientific classification
- Kingdom: Animalia
- Phylum: Arthropoda
- Class: Insecta
- Order: Odonata
- Infraorder: Anisoptera
- Family: Libellulidae
- Genus: Trithemis
- Species: T. nigra

Binomial name
- Trithemis nigra Longfield, 1936

Species of dragonfly

Trithemis nigra is a species of dragonfly in the family Libellulidae. It is endemic to São Tomé and Príncipe. Its natural habitats are subtropical or tropical moist lowland forests and rivers. It is threatened by habitat loss.
