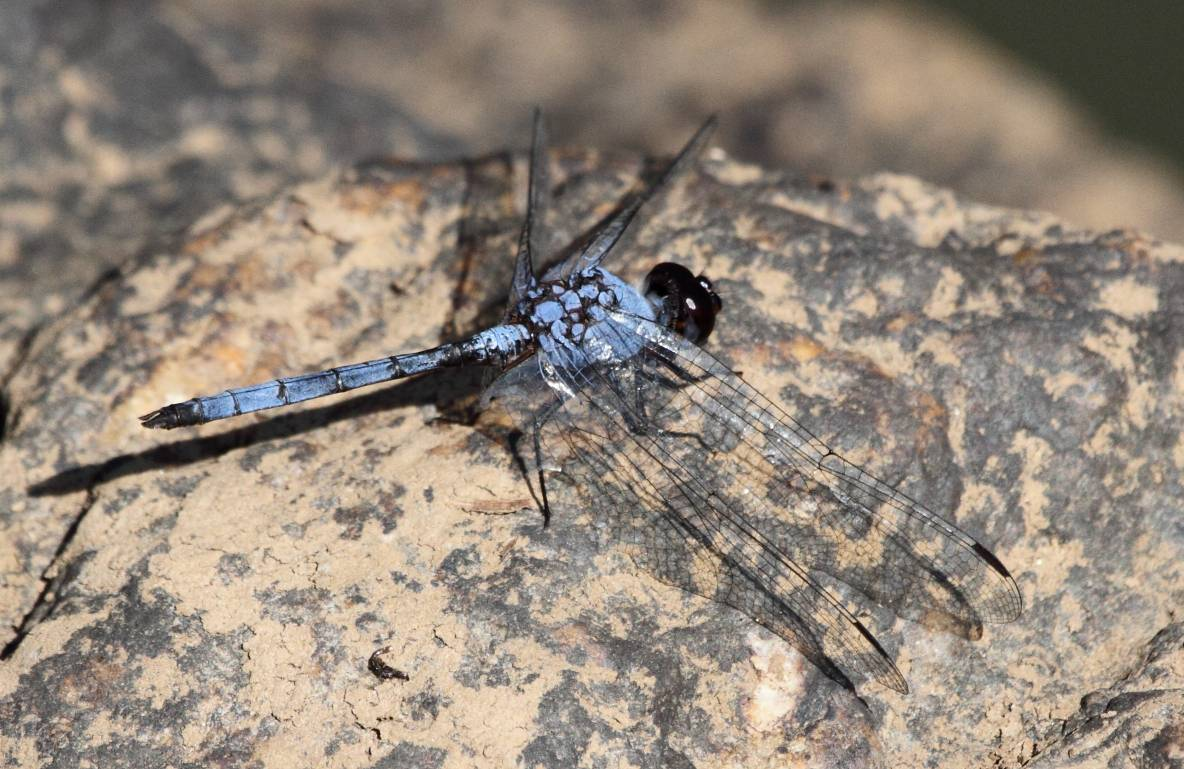
- Male

Conservation status
- Least Concern (IUCN 3.1)

Scientific classification
- Kingdom: Animalia
- Phylum: Arthropoda
- Class: Insecta
- Order: Odonata
- Infraorder: Anisoptera
- Family: Libellulidae
- Genus: Trithemis
- Species: T. donaldsoni

Binomial name
- Trithemis donaldsoni (Calvert, 1899)

Synonyms
- Pseudomacromia donaldsoni Calvert, 1899

= Trithemis donaldsoni =

Species of dragonfly

Trithemis donaldsoni is a species of dragonfly in the family Libellulidae. Common names include denim dropwing and Donaldson's dropwing.

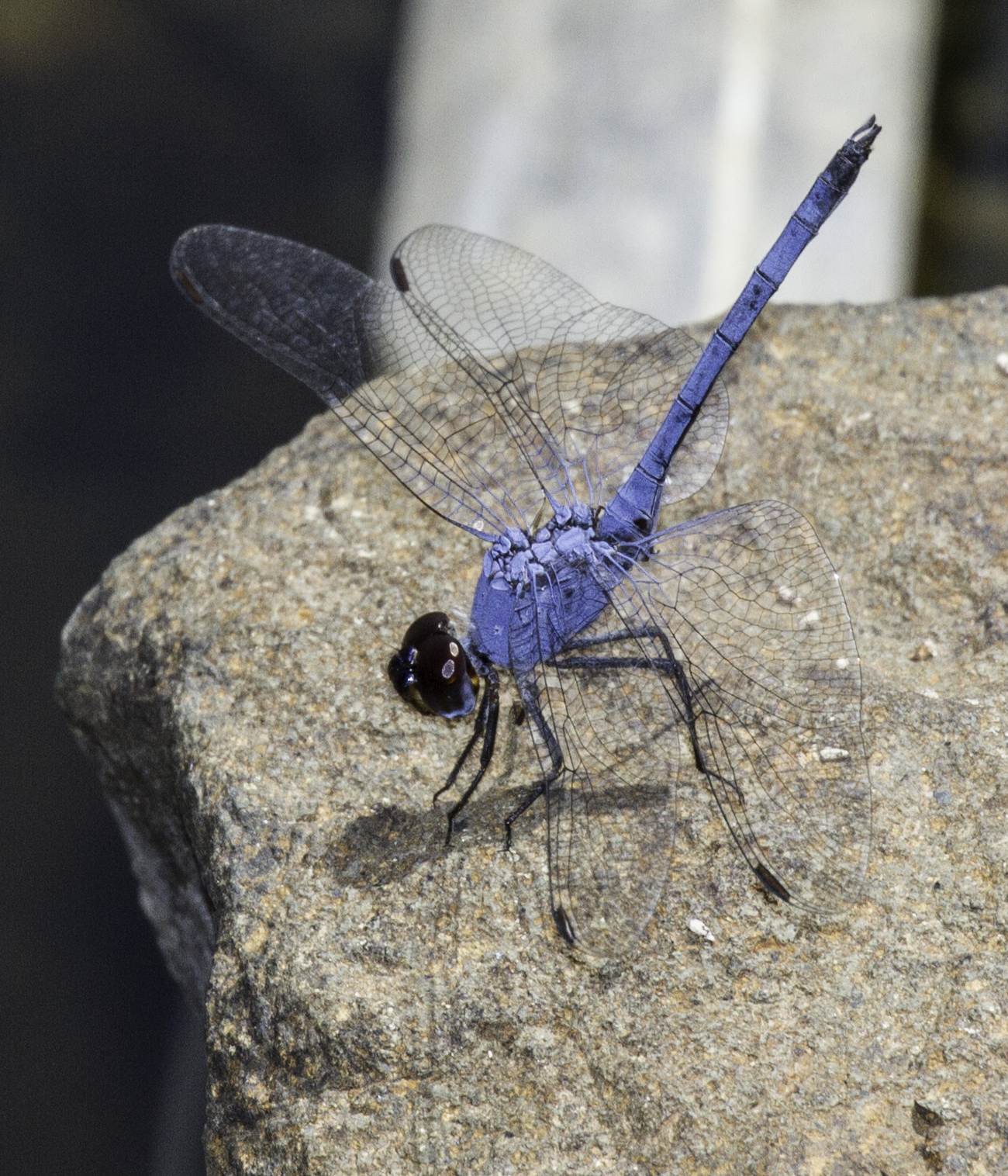
Denim Dropwing Male. Tshipese, South Africa

== Distribution ==
This dropwing is found in southern and eastern Africa from South Africa and Namibia to Ethiopia. It is found in Angola, Botswana, the Democratic Republic of the Congo, Ethiopia, Kenya, Malawi, Mozambique, Namibia, South Africa, Tanzania, Uganda, Zimbabwe. Records from West Africa are doubtful because this species is very similar to Trithemis dejouxi.

== Habitat ==
Natural habitats include streams and rivers in bush, savanna and woodland. Males are usually seen perching on rocks in mid-stream. Also found in some reservoirs.
