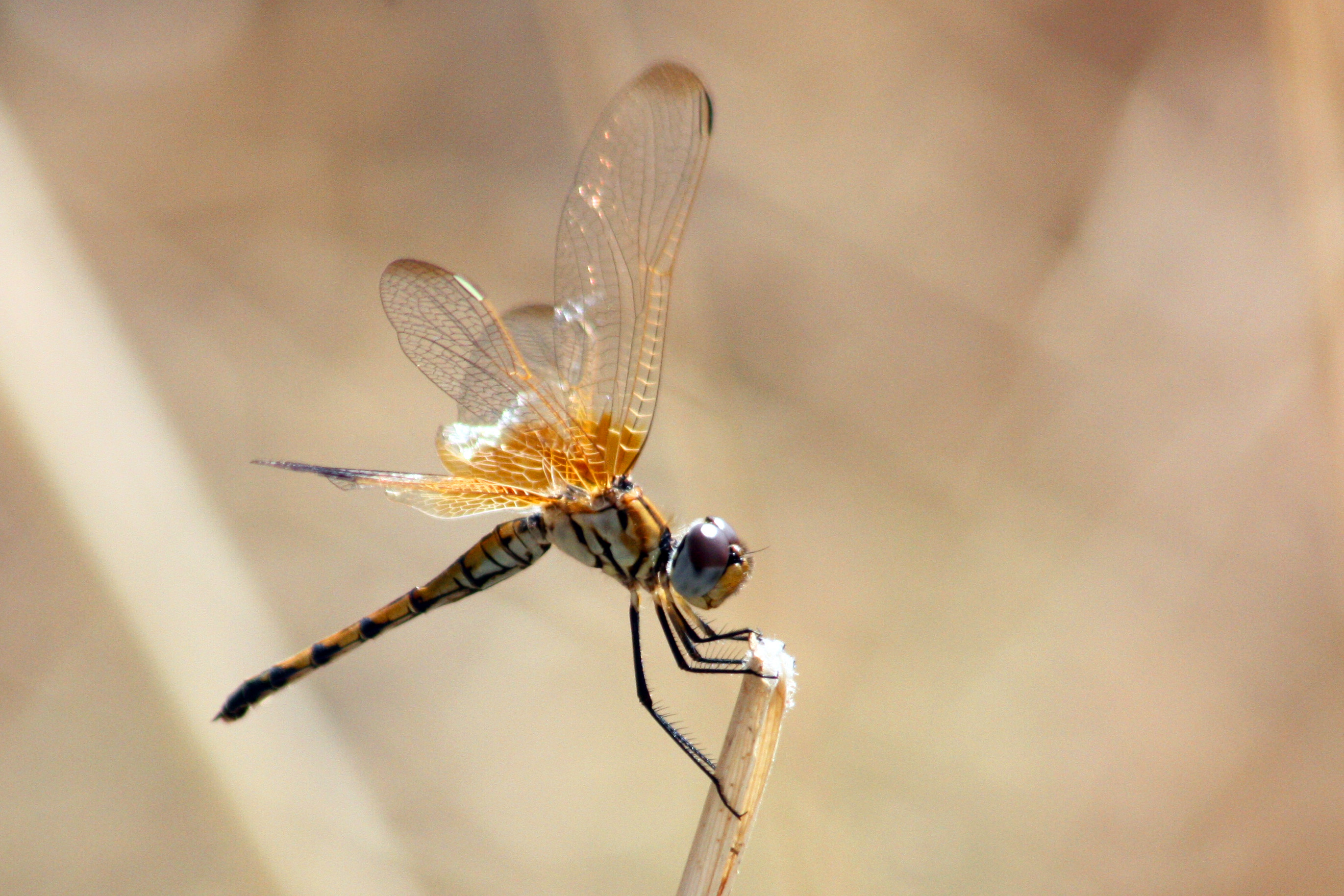
- in the Okavango Delta, Botswana

Conservation status
- Least Concern (IUCN 3.1)

Scientific classification
- Kingdom: Animalia
- Phylum: Arthropoda
- Clade: Pancrustacea
- Class: Insecta
- Order: Odonata
- Infraorder: Anisoptera
- Family: Libellulidae
- Genus: Trithemis
- Species: T. monardi

Binomial name
- Trithemis monardi Ris, 1931

= Trithemis monardi =

Species of dragonfly

Trithemis monardi is a species of dragonfly in the family Libellulidae. It is found in Angola, Benin, Botswana, Burkina Faso, Cameroon, Central African Republic, the Democratic Republic of the Congo, Ivory Coast, Ethiopia, Gabon, Gambia, Ghana, Kenya, Malawi, Mali, Mozambique, Namibia, Nigeria, Sierra Leone, Uganda, Zambia, and Zimbabwe. Its natural habitats are subtropical or tropical moist lowland forests, subtropical or tropical dry shrubland, subtropical or tropical moist shrubland, rivers, swamps, freshwater marshes, and intermittent freshwater marshes.
