= Trithemis africana =

Conservation status
- Least Concern (IUCN 3.1)

Scientific classification
- Kingdom: Animalia
- Phylum: Arthropoda
- Class: Insecta
- Order: Odonata
- Infraorder: Anisoptera
- Family: Libellulidae
- Genus: Trithemis
- Species: T. africana

Binomial name
- Trithemis africana (Brauer, 1867)

Synonyms
- Tramea africana Brauer, 1867; Trithemis tropicana Fraser, 1953

Species of dragonfly

Trithemis africana, the western phantom dropwing, is a species of dragonfly in the family Libellulidae. It is found in Western and Central Africa, in Cameroon, Sierra Leone, Liberia, and Cote d'Ivoire.
