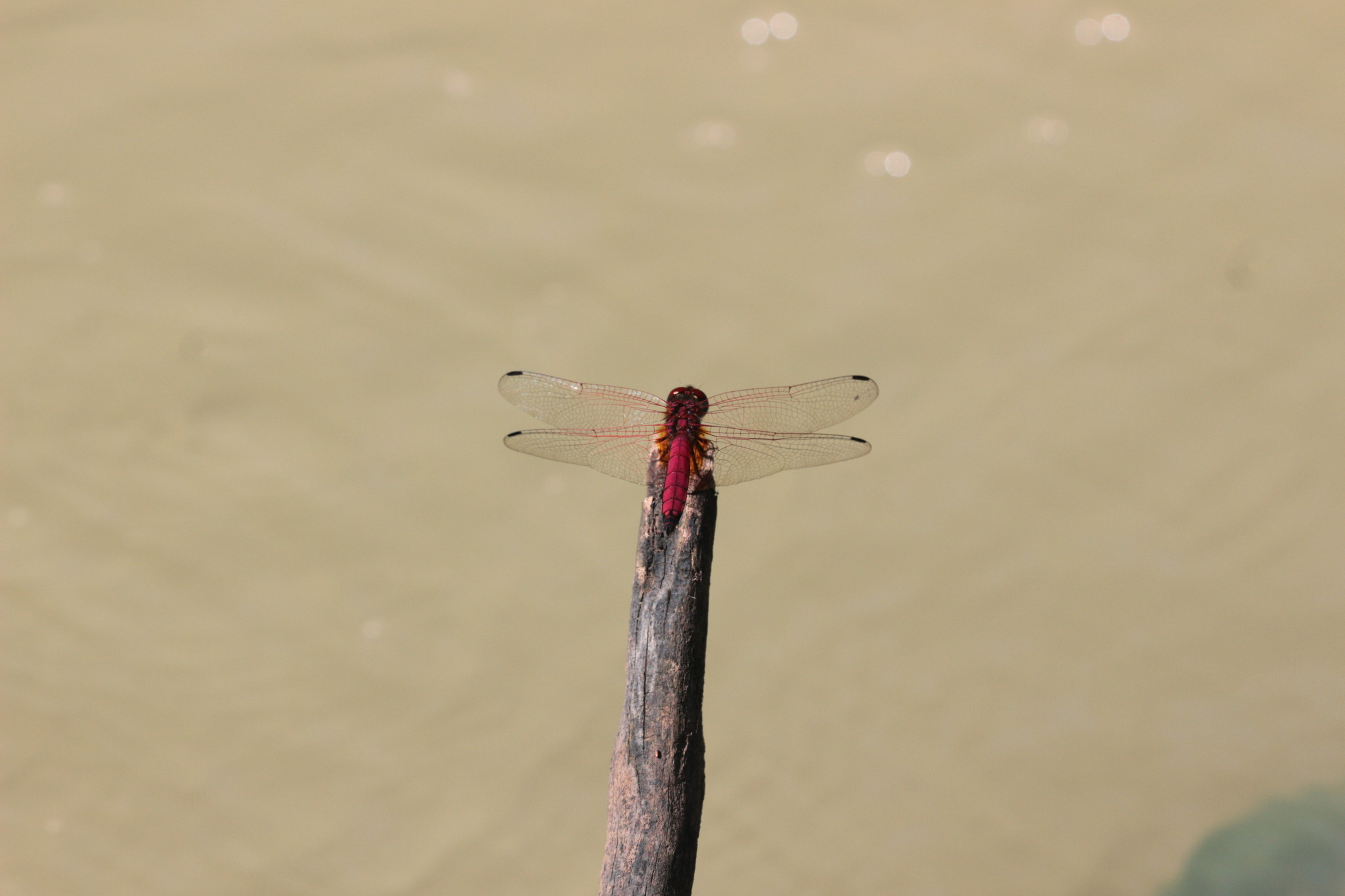

Conservation status
- Least Concern (IUCN 3.1)

Scientific classification
- Kingdom: Animalia
- Phylum: Arthropoda
- Class: Insecta
- Order: Odonata
- Infraorder: Anisoptera
- Family: Libellulidae
- Genus: Trithemis
- Species: T. selika

Binomial name
- Trithemis selika Selys, 1869

= Trithemis selika =

Species of insect

Trithemis selika, also known by its common name crimson dropwing, is a species from the genus Trithemis. It is endemic to Madagascar. The species name comes from the heroine of the opera L'Africaine.
