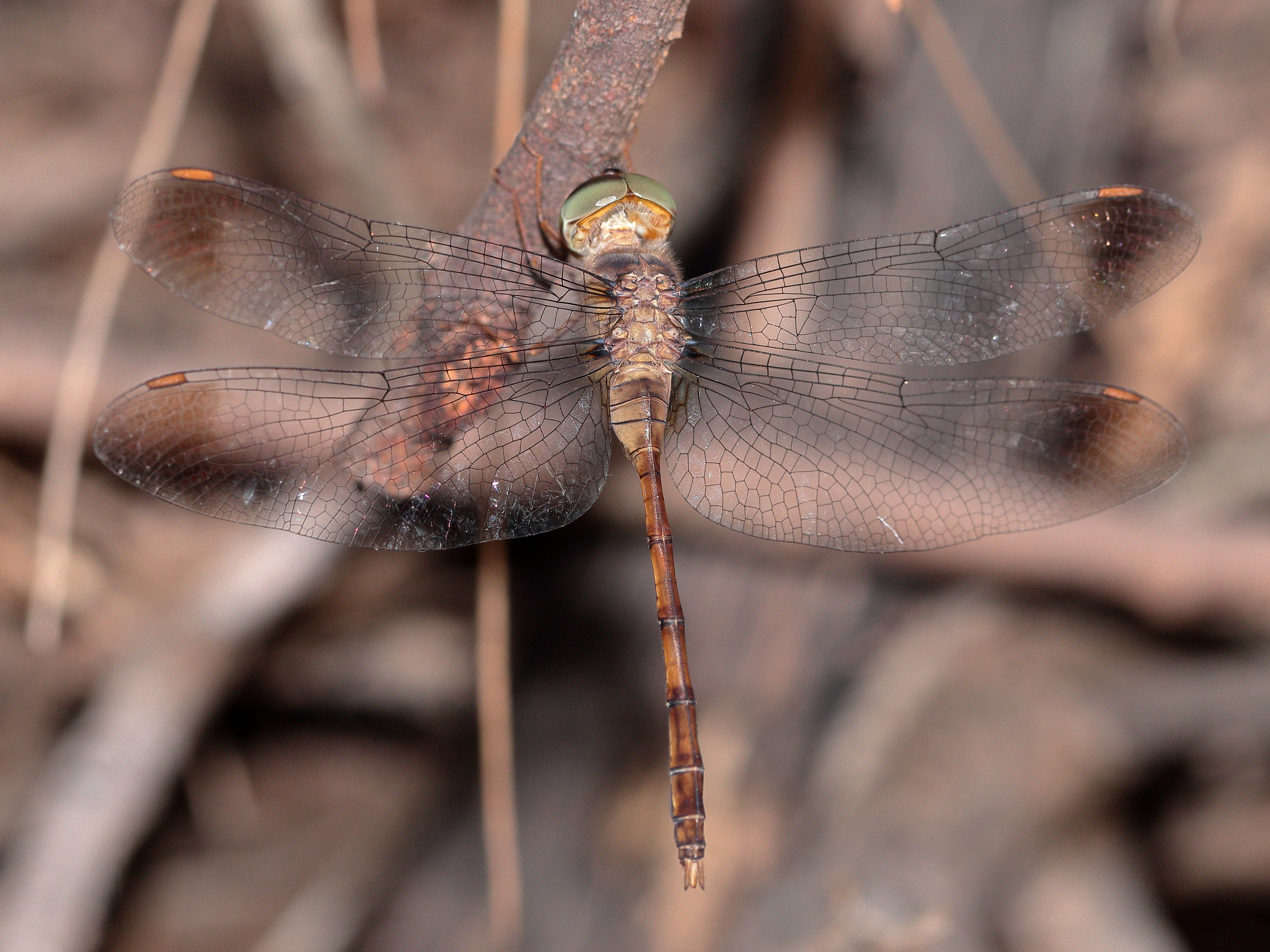
- Male

Conservation status
- Least Concern (IUCN 3.1)

Scientific classification
- Kingdom: Animalia
- Phylum: Arthropoda
- Clade: Pancrustacea
- Class: Insecta
- Order: Odonata
- Infraorder: Anisoptera
- Family: Libellulidae
- Genus: Zyxomma
- Species: Z. elgneri

Binomial name
- Zyxomma elgneri Ris, 1913

= Zyxomma elgneri =

Short-tailed duskdarter

Species of dragonfly

Zyxomma elgneri is a species of dragonfly in the family Libellulidae, known as the short-tailed duskdarter. It is a slender and short-bodied dragonfly with dull-coloured markings. It inhabits a range of water sources including rivers, ponds and swamps in northern and eastern Australia, and New Guinea.

== Etymology ==
The genus name Zyxomma is derived from the Greek ζεῦξις (zeuxis, "yoking" or "joining together") and ὄμμα (omma, "eye"), referring to the large, adjoining eyes.

In 1913, Friedrich Ris named this species elgneri, an eponym honouring Hermann Elgner (c. 1856–1913) for access to his extensive collections from northern Australia and the Aru Islands.

== Gallery ==
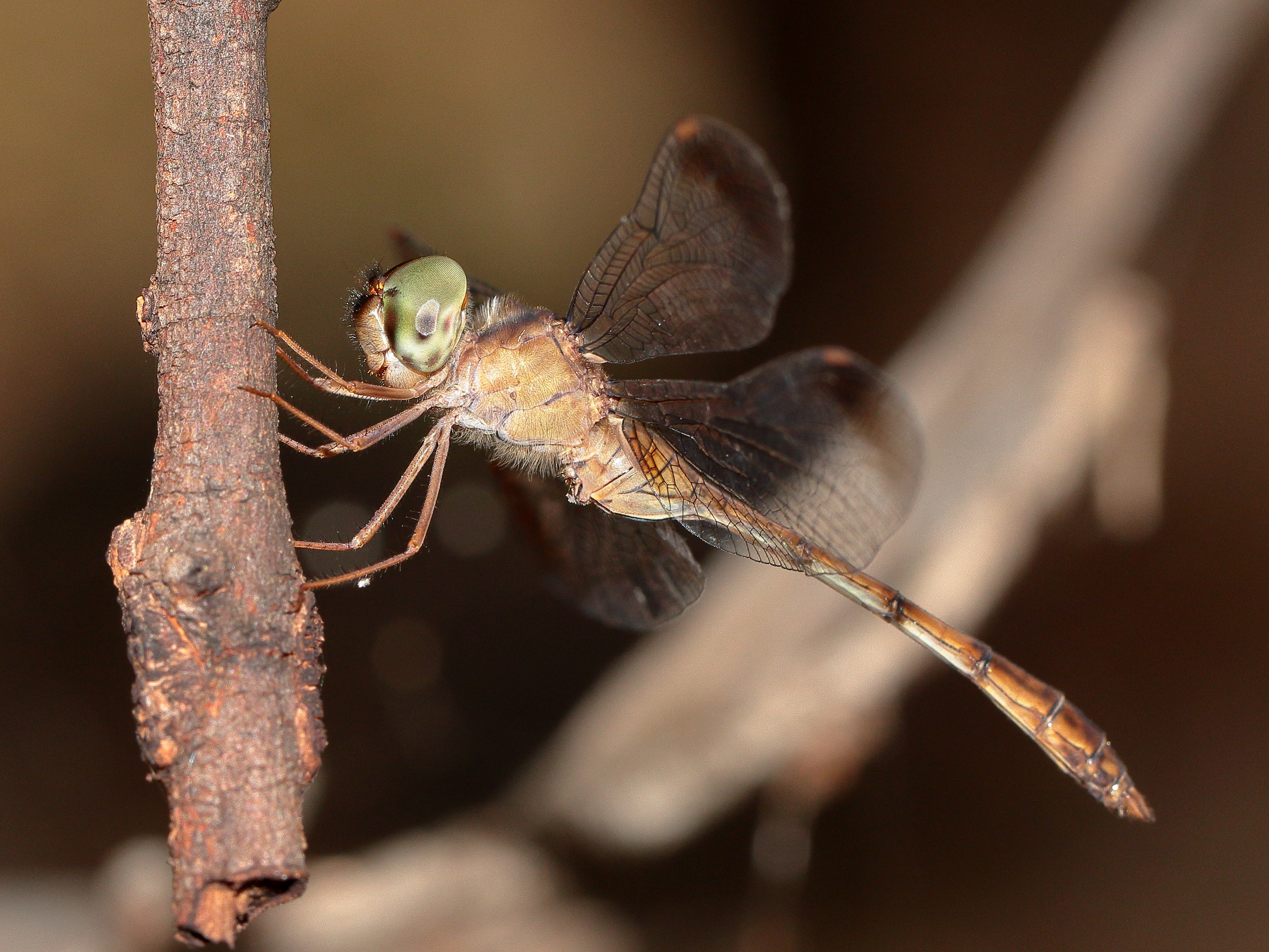
Male lateral view

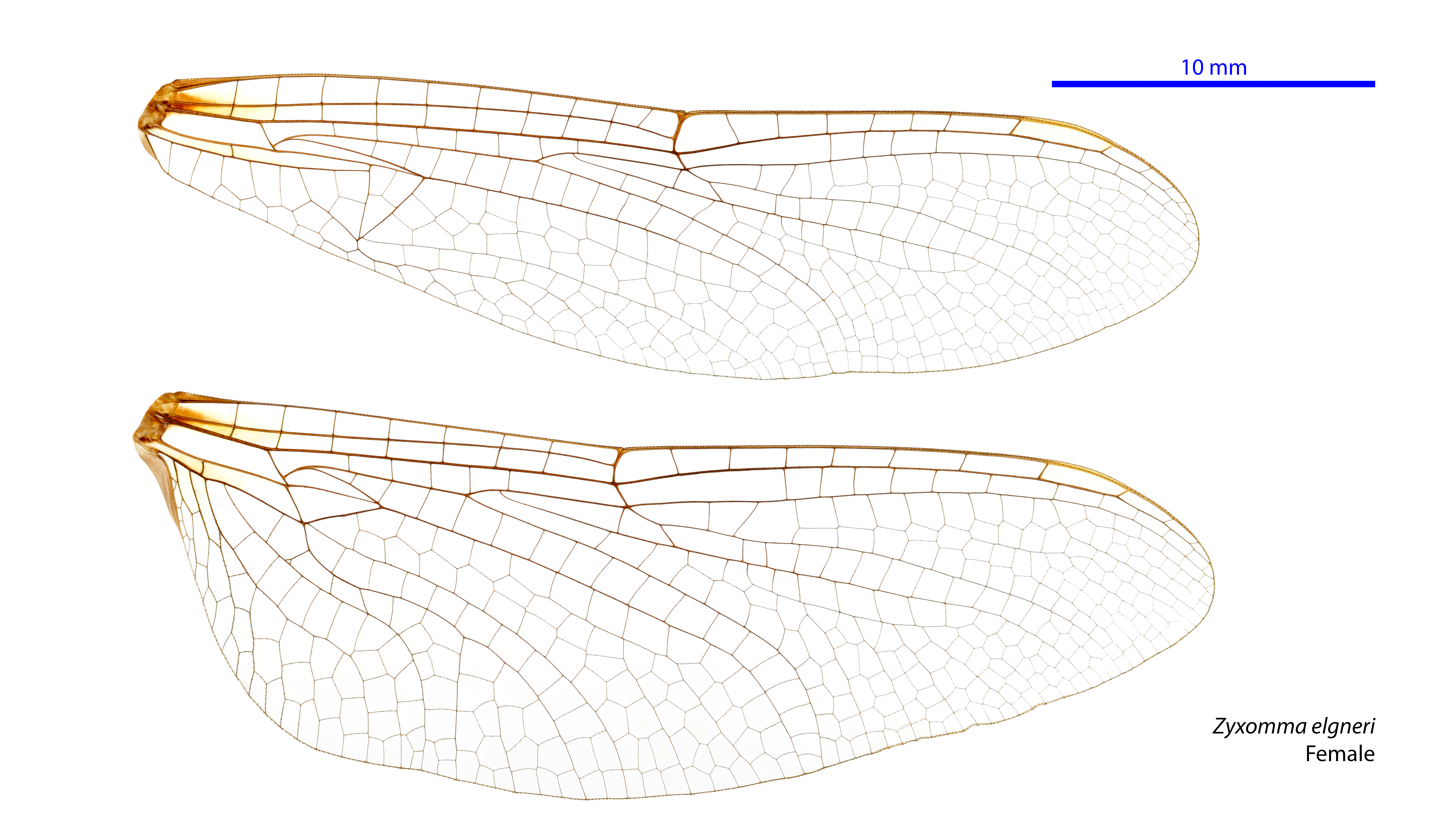
Female wings

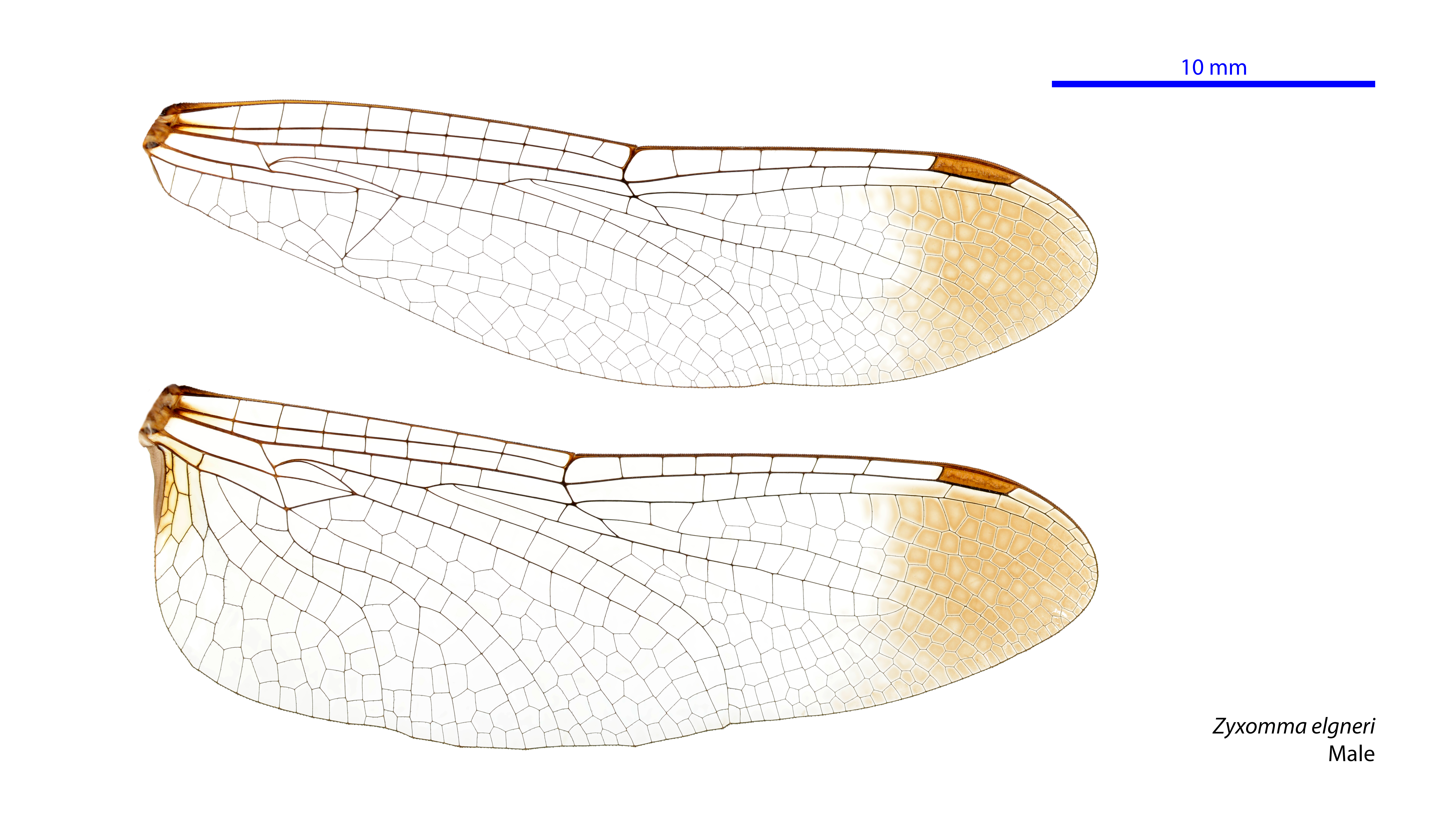
Male wings

== See also ==
- List of Odonata species of Australia
