= Zyxomma multinervorum =

Large duskdarter

Conservation status
- Least Concern (IUCN 3.1)

Scientific classification
- Kingdom: Animalia
- Phylum: Arthropoda
- Clade: Pancrustacea
- Class: Insecta
- Order: Odonata
- Infraorder: Anisoptera
- Family: Libellulidae
- Genus: Zyxomma
- Species: Z. multinervorum

Binomial name
- Zyxomma multinervorum Carpenter, 1897

Synonyms
- Zyxomma multinervis Carpenter, 1897

Species of dragonfly

Zyxomma multinervorum is a species of dragonfly in the family Libellulidae, known as the large duskdarter. It is a stout and short-bodied dragonfly with dull-coloured markings. It has been found in north-eastern Australia, New Guinea and the Maluku Islands.

== Etymology ==
The genus name Zyxomma is derived from the Greek ζεῦξις (zeuxis, "yoking" or "joining together") and ὄμμα (omma, "eye"), referring to the large, adjoining eyes.

The species name multinervorum is derived from the Latin multus ("many" or "numerous") and nervus ("nerve" or "wing vein"), referring to the large number of crossveins in the wings.

== Gallery ==
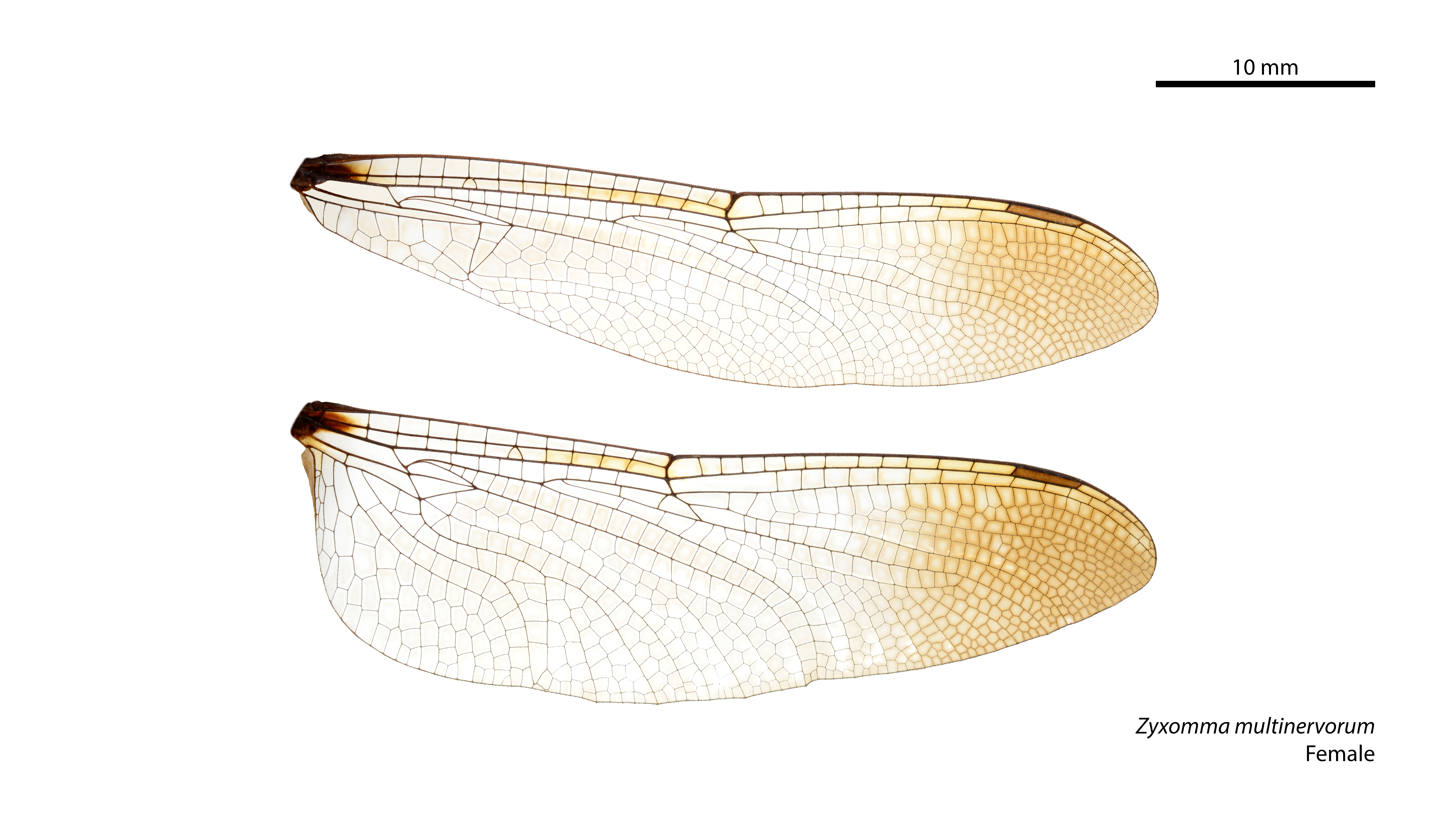
Female wings

== See also ==
- List of Odonata species of Australia
