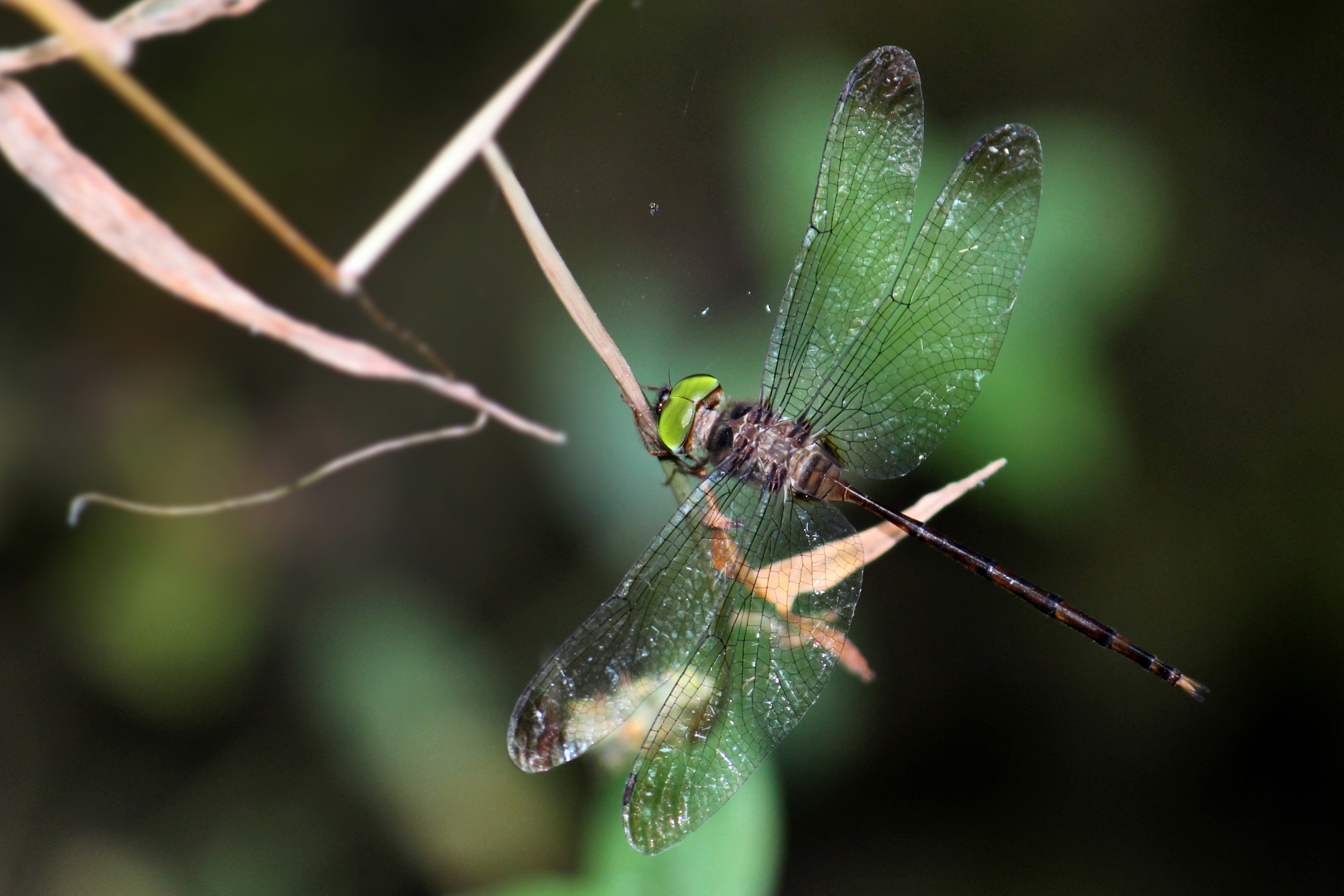
- Male
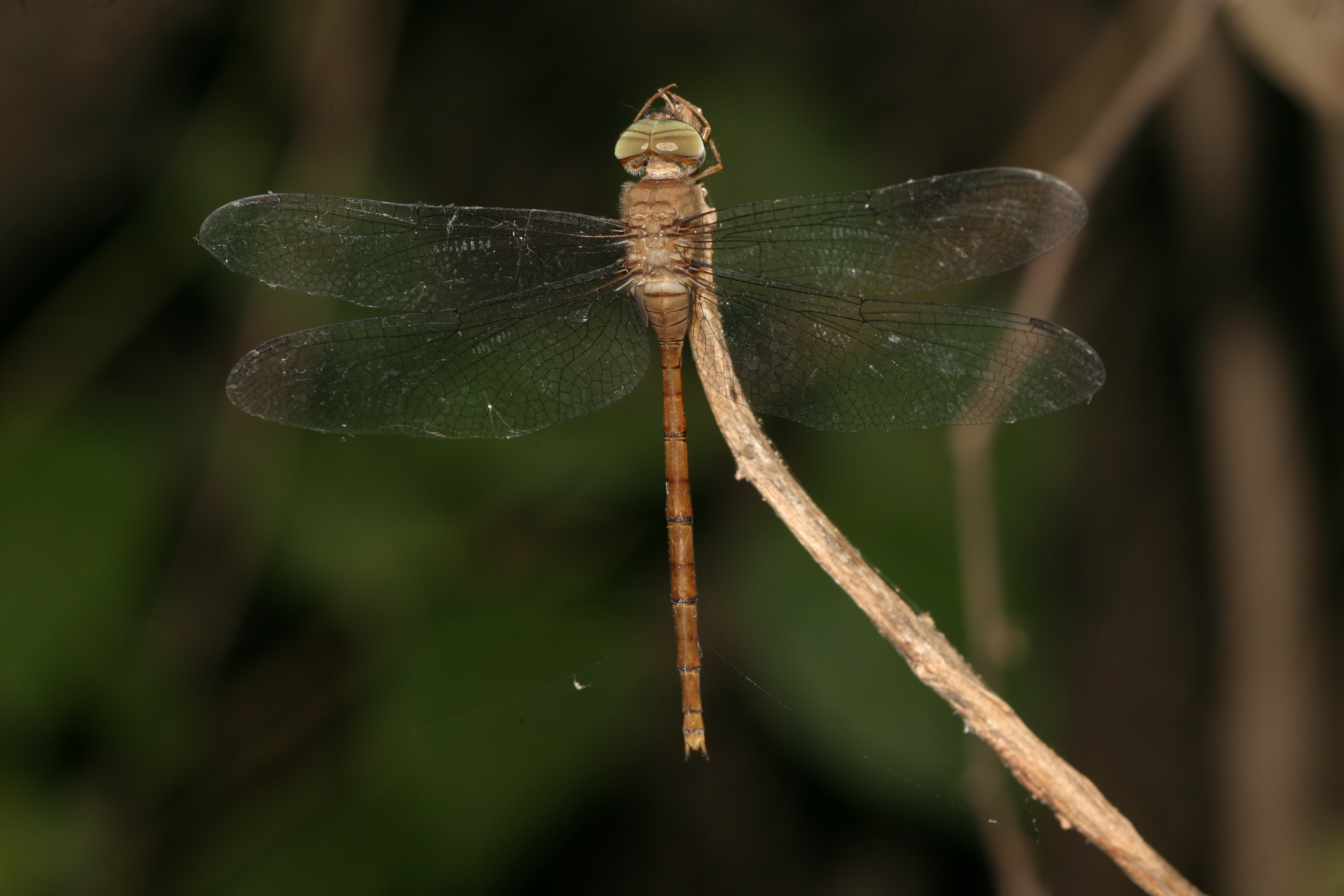
- Female

Conservation status
- Least Concern (IUCN 3.1)

Scientific classification
- Kingdom: Animalia
- Phylum: Arthropoda
- Clade: Pancrustacea
- Class: Insecta
- Order: Odonata
- Suborder: Anisoptera
- Superfamily: Libelluloidea
- Family: Libellulidae
- Genus: Zyxomma
- Species: Z. petiolatum

Binomial name
- Zyxomma petiolatum Rambur, 1842

Synonyms
- Libellula duivenbodei Brauer, 1867; Libellula pulverulenta Brauer, 1867; Zyxomma sechellarum Martin, 1896

= Zyxomma petiolatum =

Longtailed duskdarter

Species of dragonfly

Zyxomma petiolatum, known by the common names long-tailed duskdarter, brown dusk hawk and dingy duskflyer, is a species of dragonfly in the family Libellulidae. It is widespread in many Asian countries, New Guinea, northern Australia and islands in the Pacific.

== Description and habitat ==
It is a medium-sized chocolate-brown colored dragonfly with emerald-green eyes. Female is similar to the males. It breeds in small pools, ponds, swamps and slow flowing rivers. It is crepuscular but may also be active during overcast days. Usually seen in the evening as an extremely rapid flyer, flying low over water-bodies, hawking midges and mosquitoes. In daytime it roosts among vegetation and can be difficult to find.

== Etymology ==
The genus name Zyxomma is derived from the Greek ζεῦξις (zeuxis, "yoking" or "joining together") and ὄμμα (omma, "eye"), referring to the large, adjoining eyes.

The species name petiolatum is derived from the Latin petiolus ("small foot" or "leaf stalk"), referring to the excessively slender part of the abdomen.

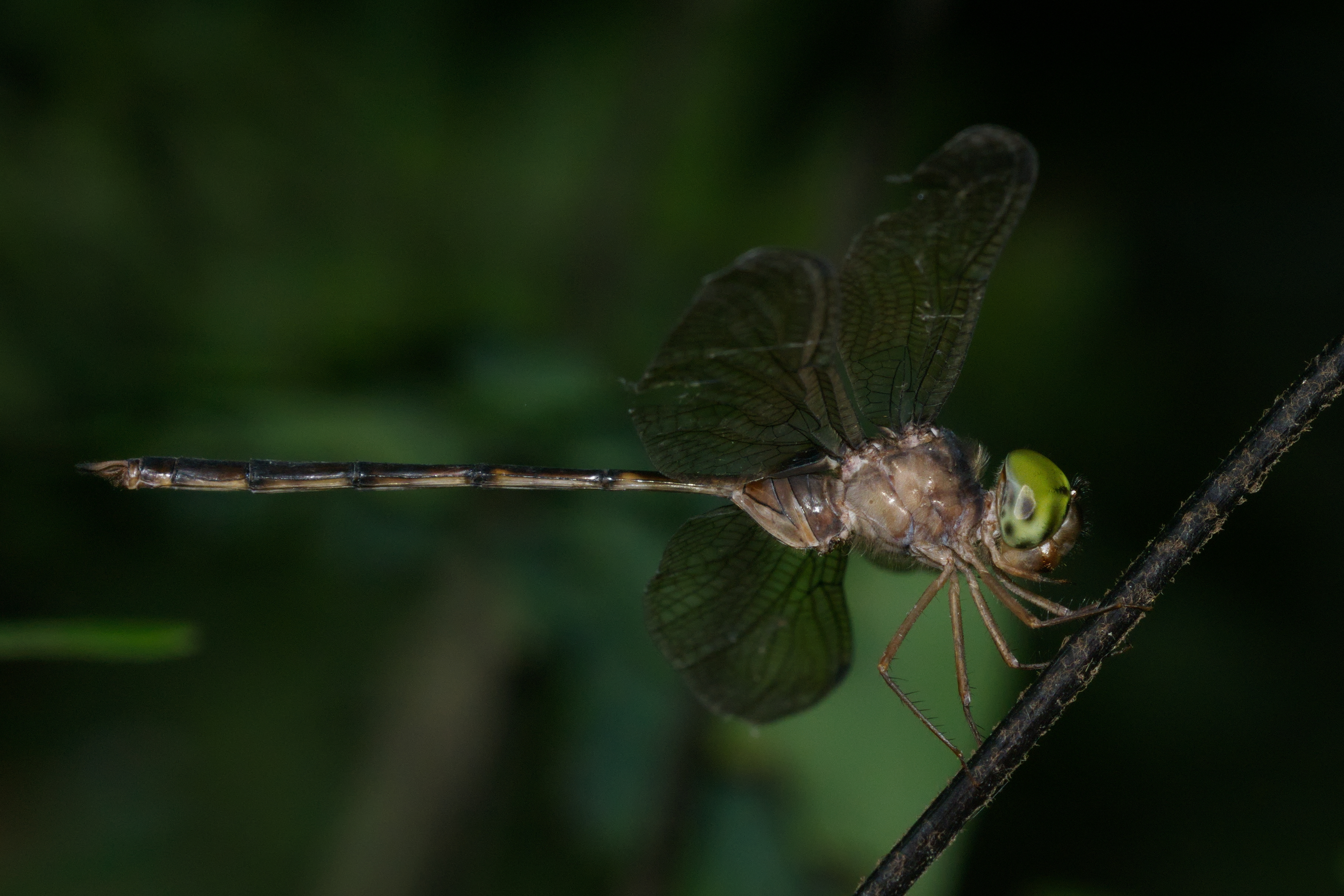
Male side view

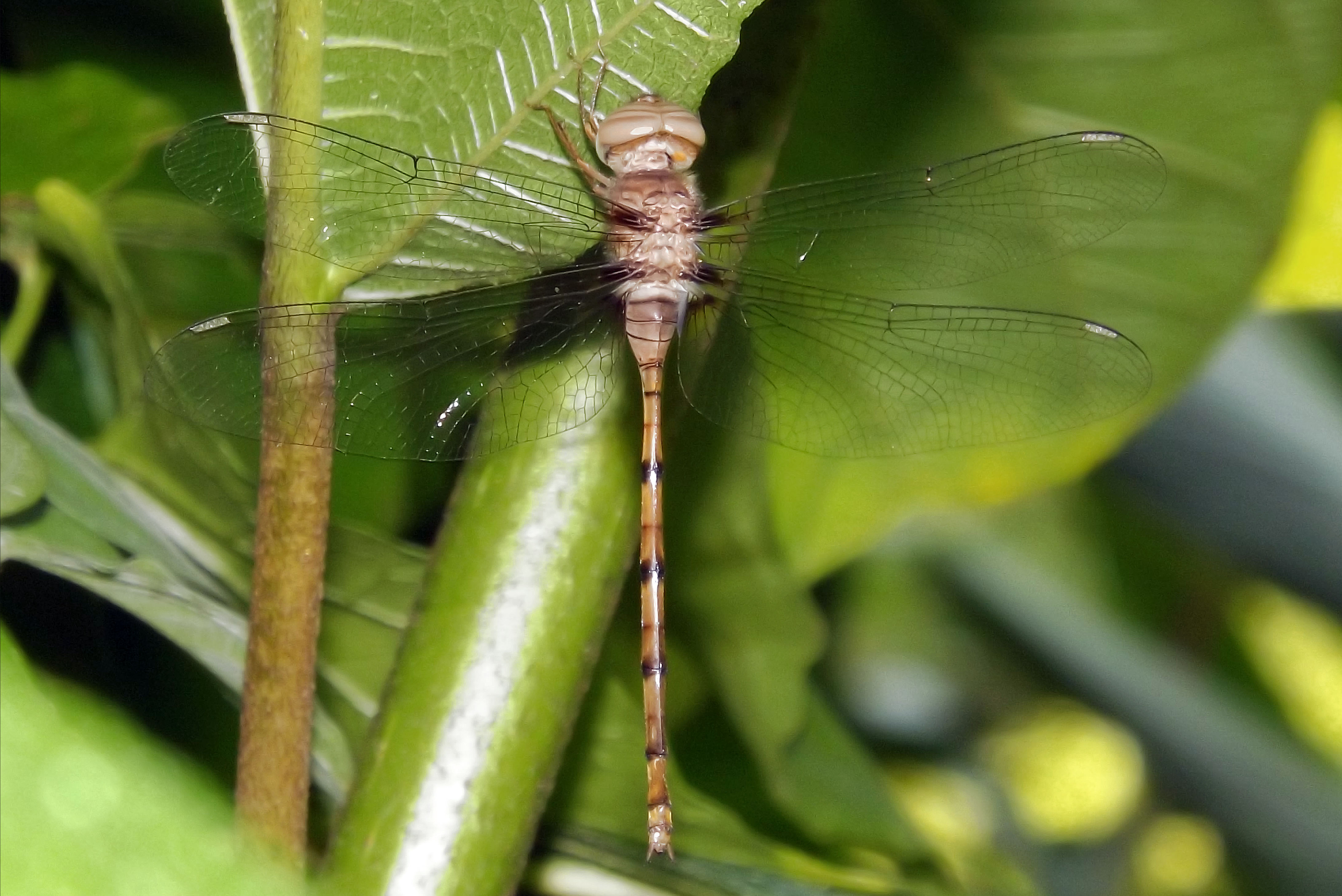
Young female

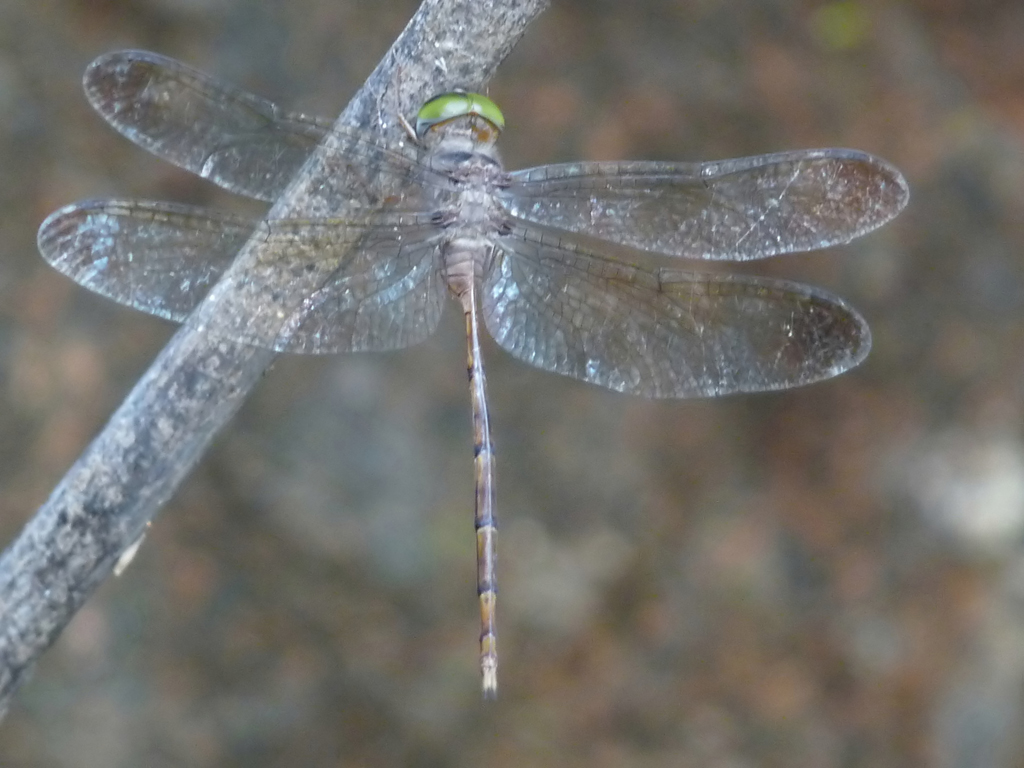
Adult female

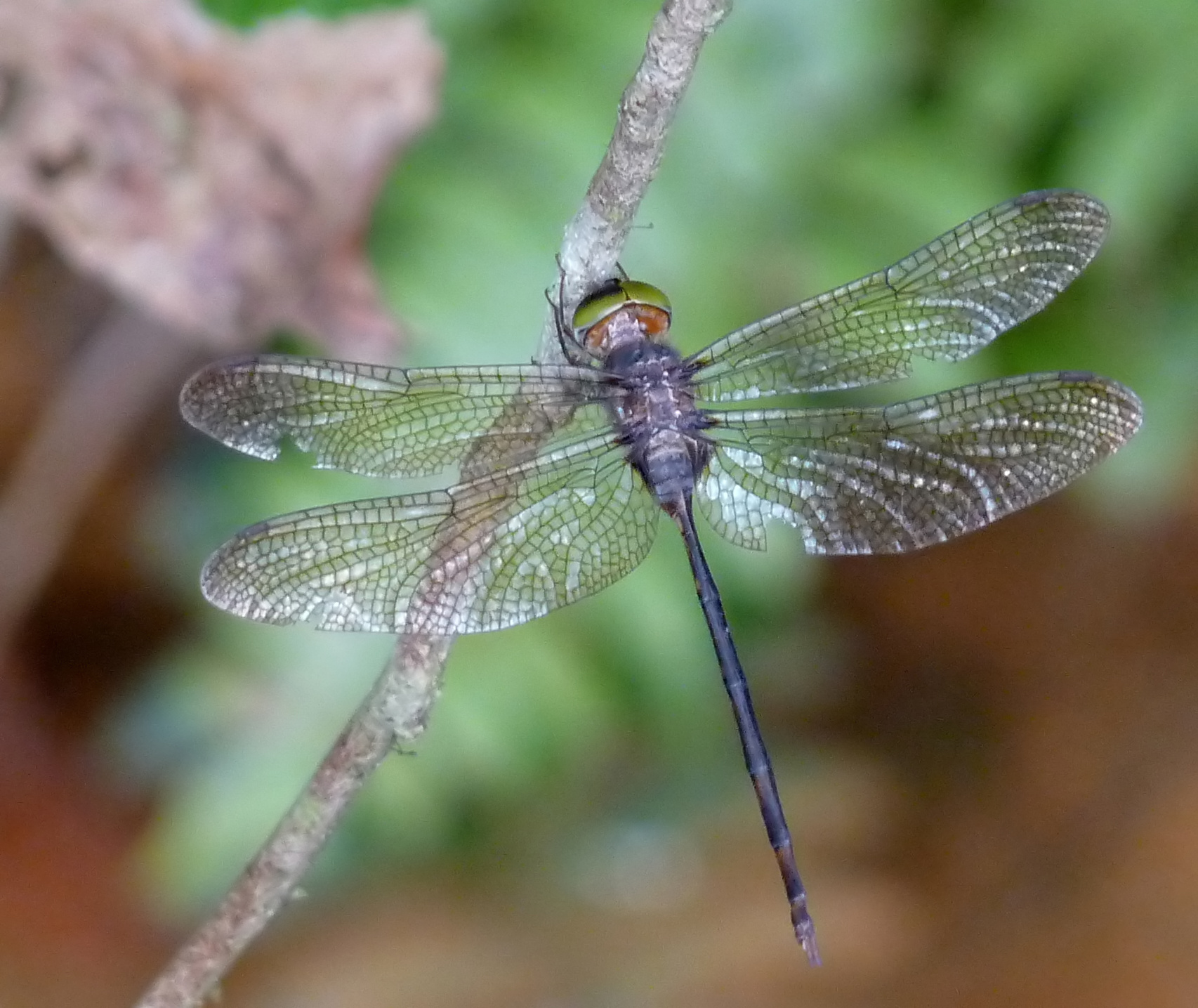
Adult male

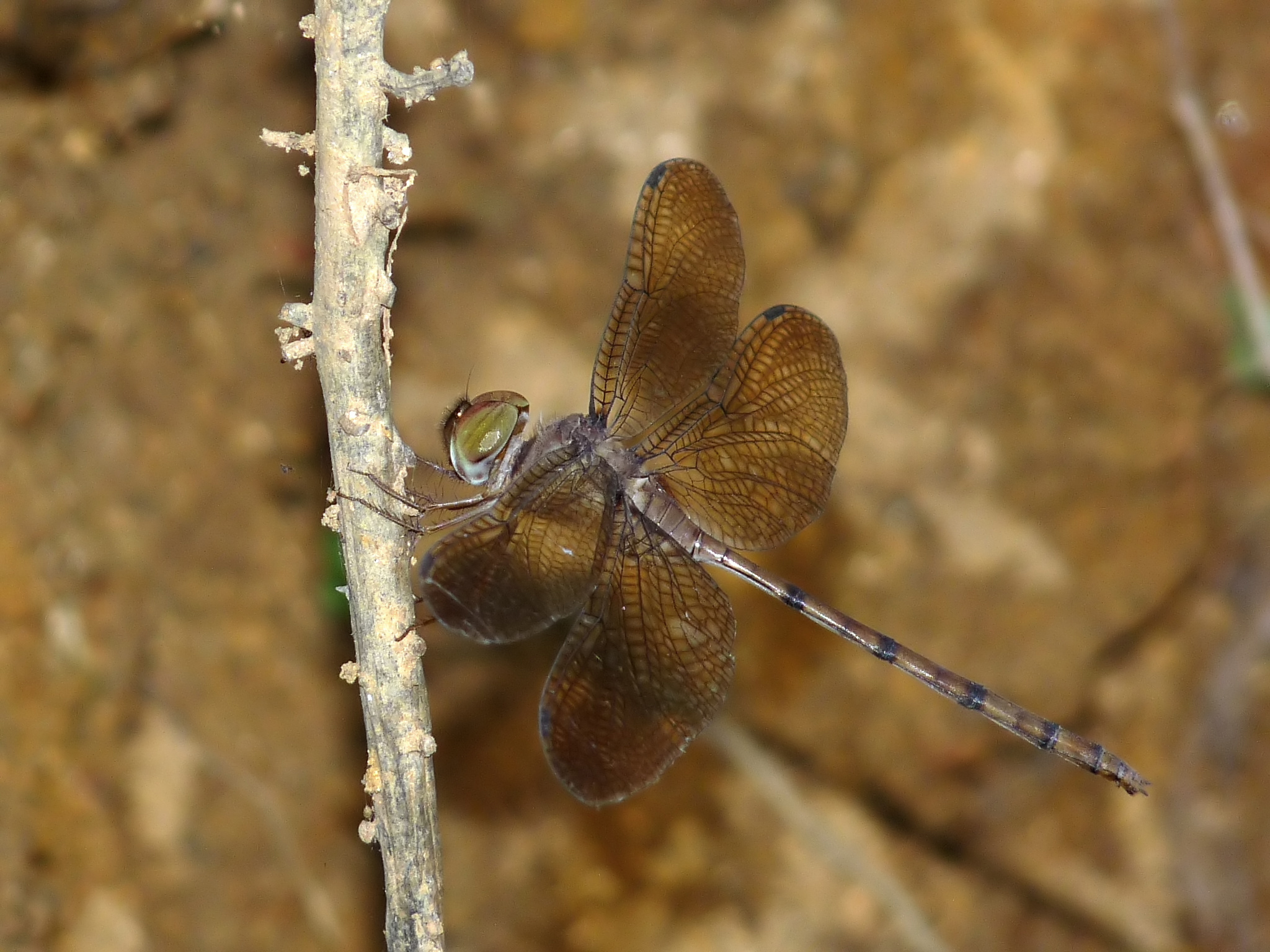
Female with dark wings

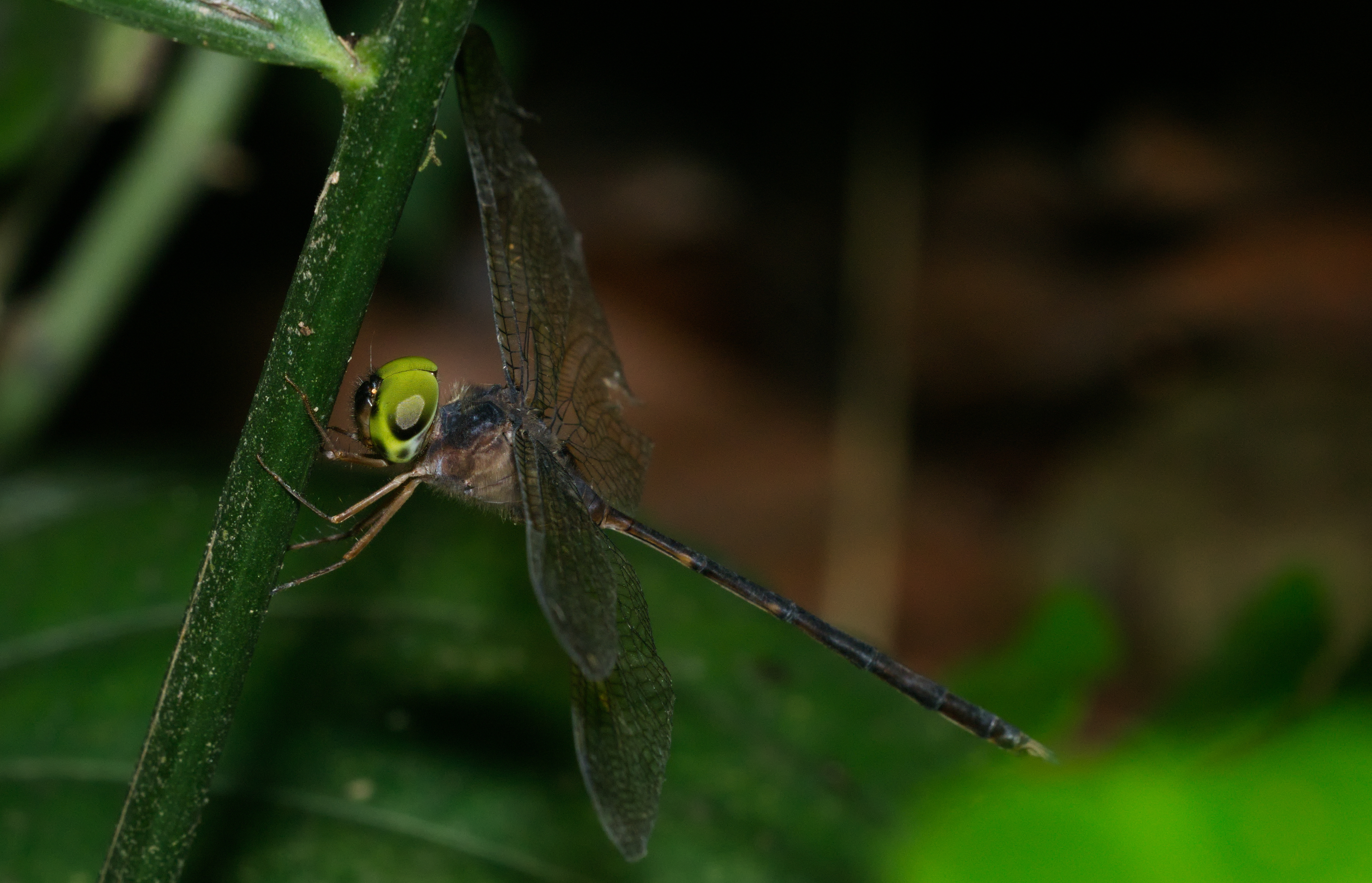
Male

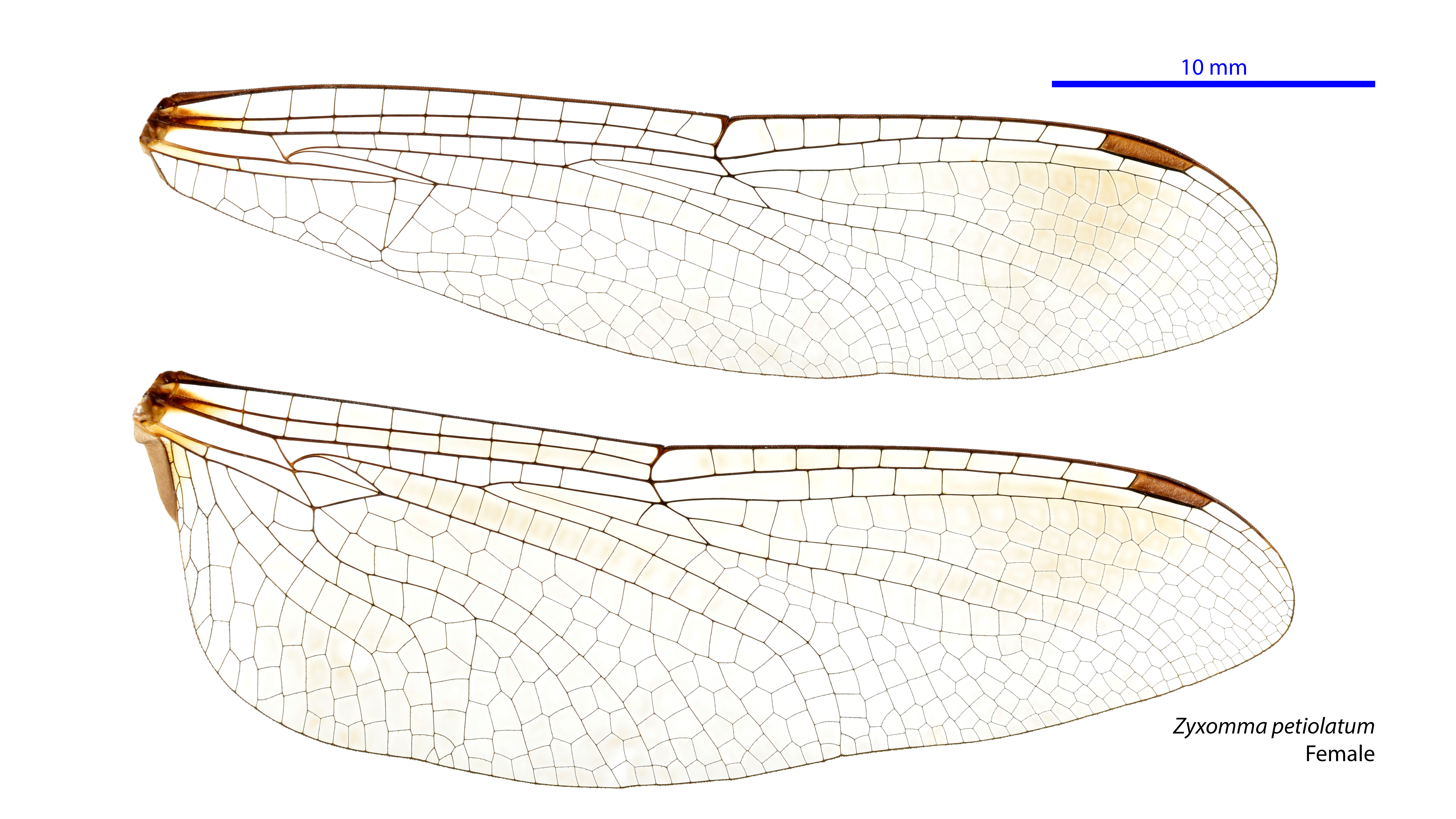
Female wings

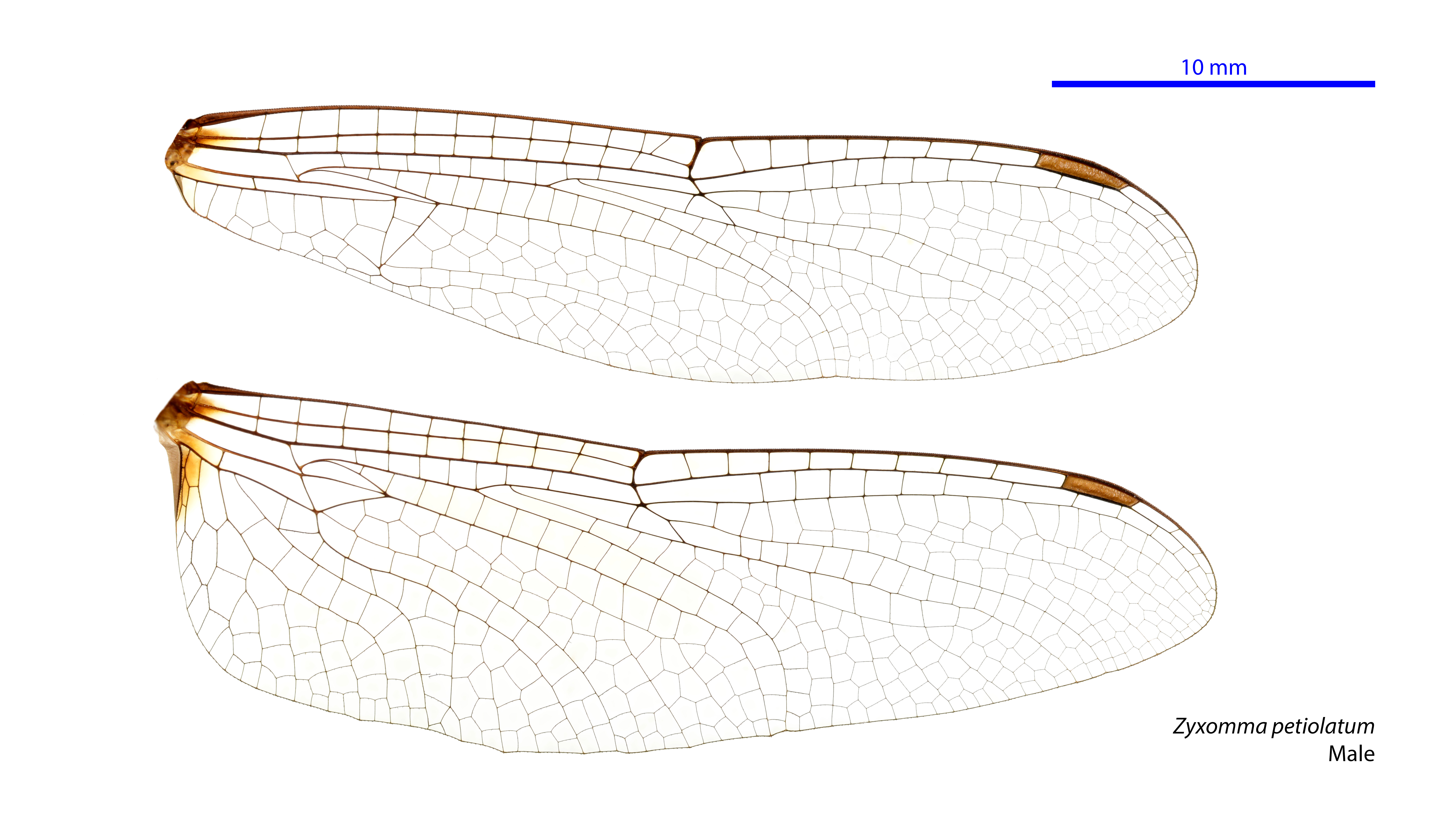
Male wings

== See also ==
- List of odonates of Sri Lanka
- List of odonates of India
- List of odonata of Kerala
- List of Odonata species of Australia
