= Zyxomma atlanticum =

Conservation status
- Least Concern (IUCN 3.1)

Scientific classification
- Kingdom: Animalia
- Phylum: Arthropoda
- Class: Insecta
- Order: Odonata
- Infraorder: Anisoptera
- Family: Libellulidae
- Genus: Zyxomma
- Species: Z. atlanticum

Binomial name
- Zyxomma atlanticum Selys, 1889

Species of dragonfly

Zyxomma atlanticum is a species of dragonfly in the family Libellulidae. It is endemic to Uganda. Its natural habitats are subtropical or tropical moist lowland forests and shrub-dominated wetlands.
