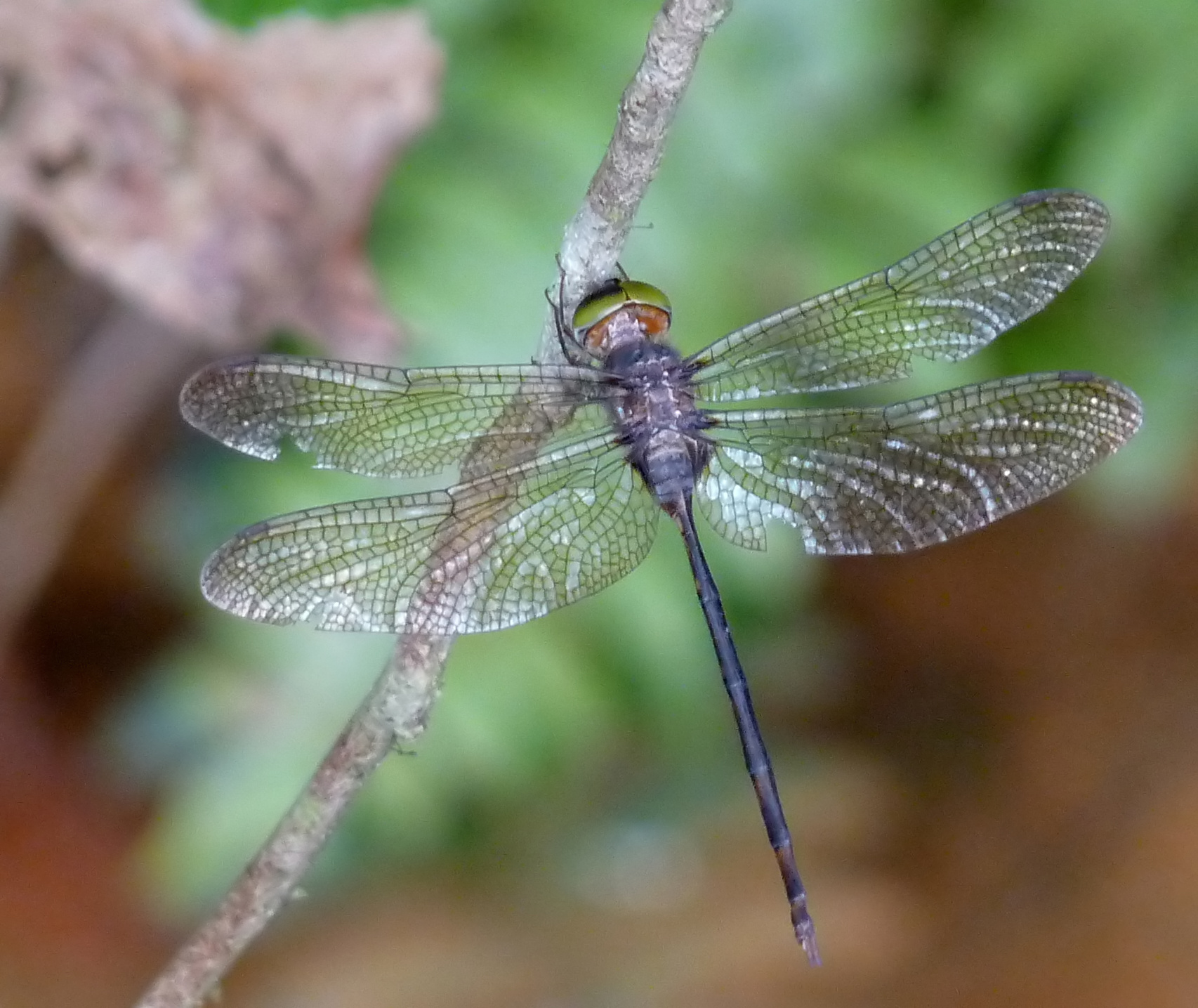
- Zyxomma petiolatum

Scientific classification
- Kingdom: Animalia
- Phylum: Arthropoda
- Clade: Pancrustacea
- Class: Insecta
- Order: Odonata
- Infraorder: Anisoptera
- Family: Libellulidae
- Subfamily: Trameinae
- Tribe: Zyxommatini
- Genus: Zyxomma; Rambur, 1842

= Zyxomma =

Duskdarters

Genus of insects

Zyxomma is a genus of dragonfly in the family Libellulidae. Species of Zyxomma are small to medium-sized, dully coloured, crepuscular insects. They are known as Duskdarters. Members of Zyxomma are found in India, Japan, Africa and Australia.

== Etymology ==
The genus name Zyxomma is derived from the Greek ζεῦξις (zeuxis, "yoking" or "joining together") and ὄμμα (omma, "eye"), referring to the large, adjoining eyes.

== Species ==
The genus Zyxomma includes the following species:

Male	Female	Scientific name	Common name	Distribution
		Zyxomma atlanticum Selys, 1889	Smoky Duskdarter, Clear-winged Dusk-darter	widespread in central Africa
		Zyxomma breviventre (Martin, 1921)		Cambodia
		Zyxomma elgneri Ris, 1913	Short-tailed Duskdarter	New Guinea to northern Australia
		Zyxomma multinervorum Carpenter, 1897	Large Duskdarter	Australasia
		Zyxomma obtusum Albarda, 1881		Peninsular Malaysia
		Zyxomma petiolatum Rambur, 1842	Long-tailed Duskdarter	New Guinea to northern Australia

== See also ==
- Parazyxomma flavicans (Martin, 1908) - Banded Duskdarter
