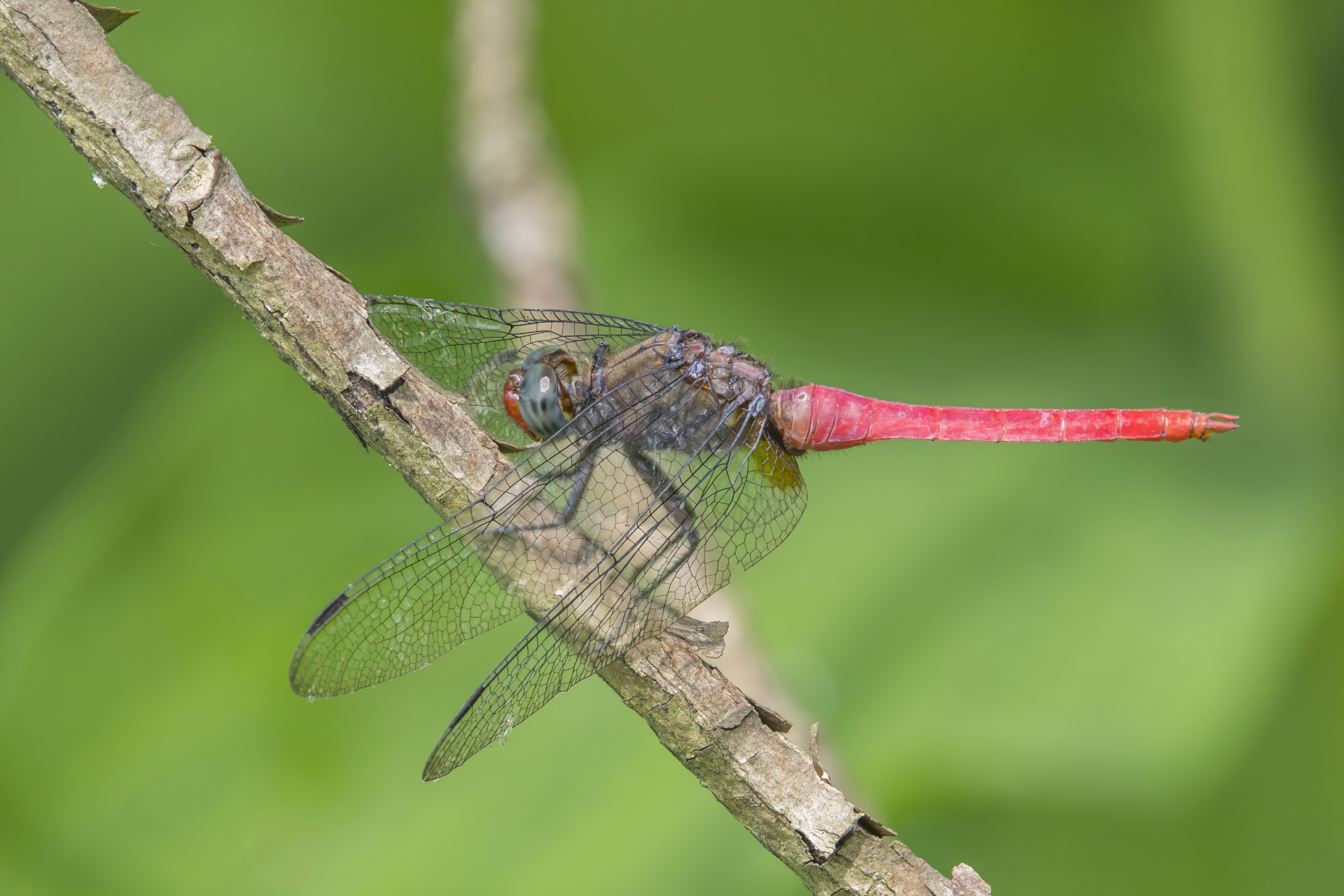
- Male, the Philippines

Conservation status
- Least Concern (IUCN 3.1)

Scientific classification
- Kingdom: Animalia
- Phylum: Arthropoda
- Clade: Pancrustacea
- Class: Insecta
- Order: Odonata
- Infraorder: Anisoptera
- Family: Libellulidae
- Genus: Orthetrum
- Species: O. chrysis

Binomial name
- Orthetrum chrysis (Selys, 1891)

= Orthetrum chrysis =

Spine-tufted Skimmer

Species of dragonfly

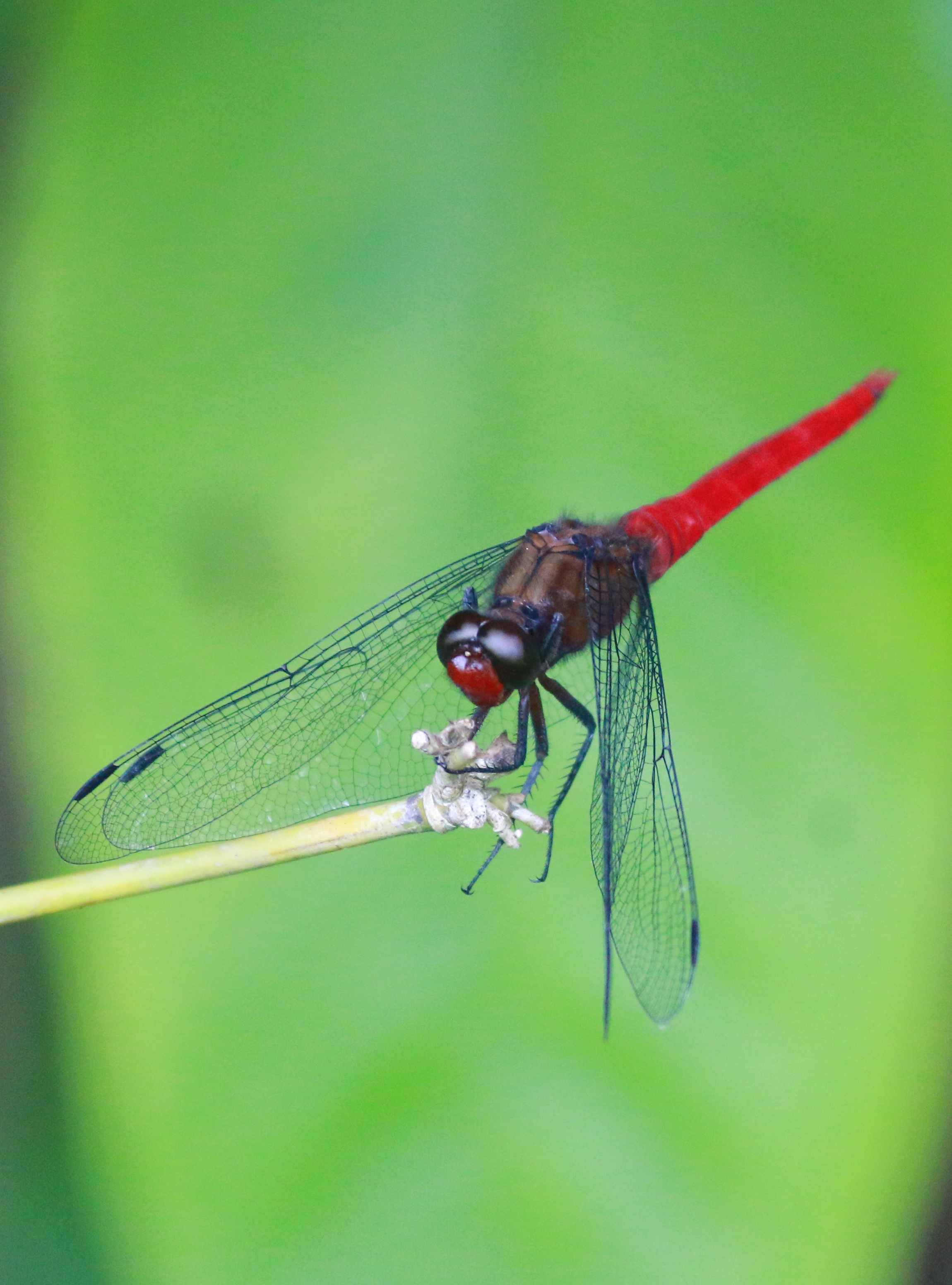
Orthetrum chrysis, Brown-backed Red Marsh Hawk

The Spine-tufted skimmer, or brown-backed red marsh hawk, (Orthetrum chrysis) is a species of dragonfly in the family Libellulidae. It is widespread in many Asian countries.

== Description and habitat ==
It is a medium sized dragonfly with dark thorax and blood-red abdomen. It looks very similar to Orthetrum pruinosum in shape and size; but can be distinguished by the color of the abdomen. The abdomen of the female is ochreous brown. It breeds in pools and marshes.

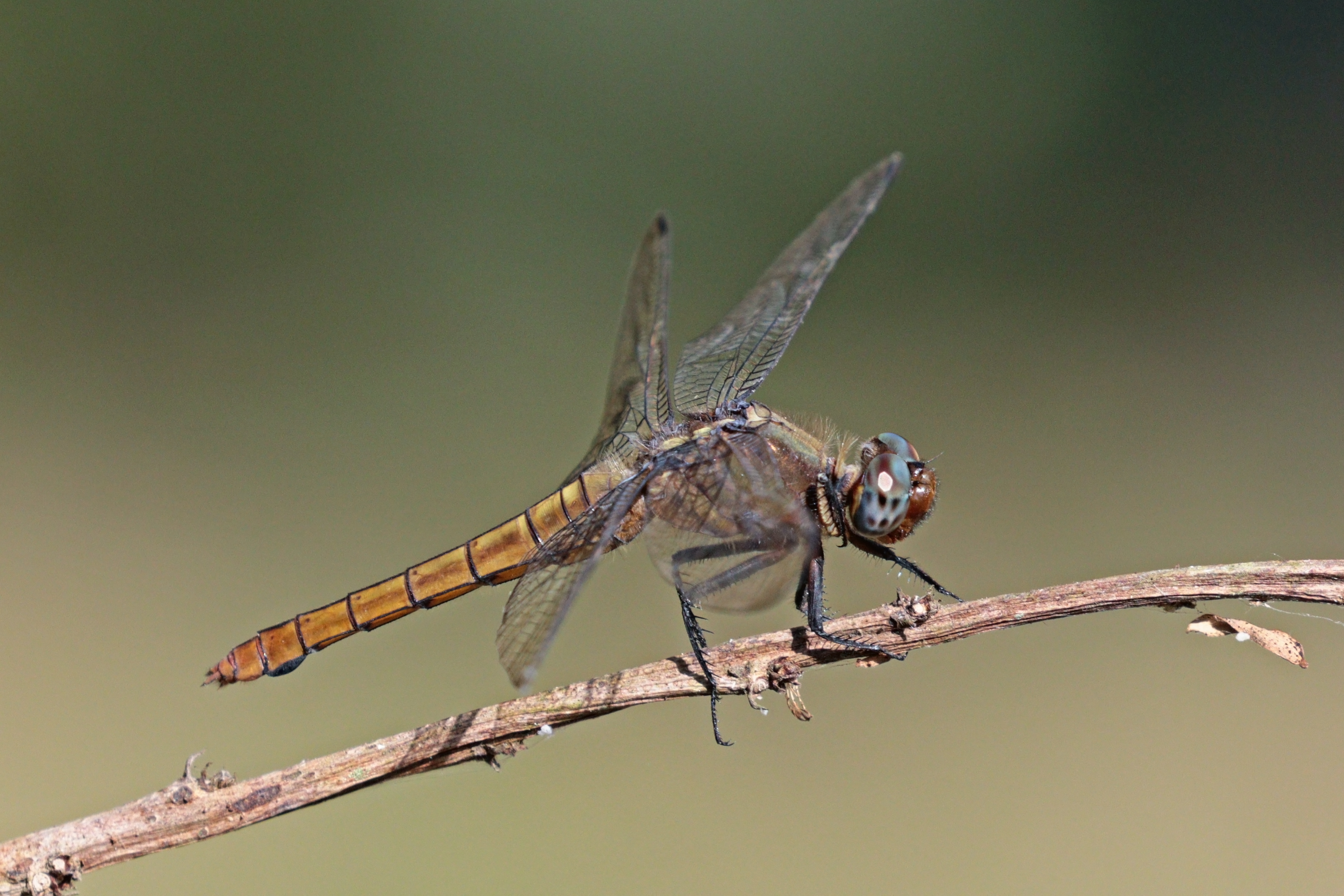
female, Nepal

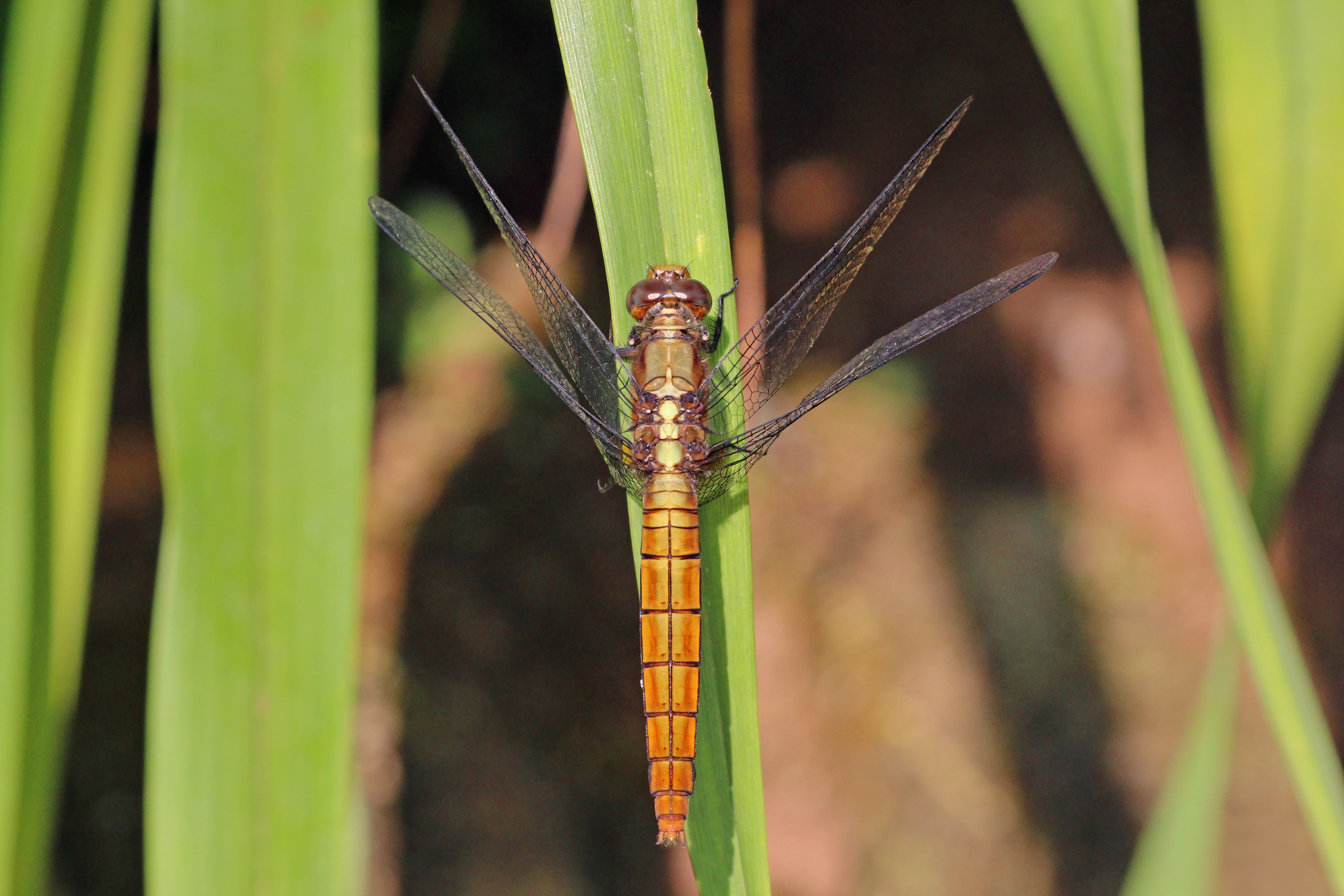
female, India

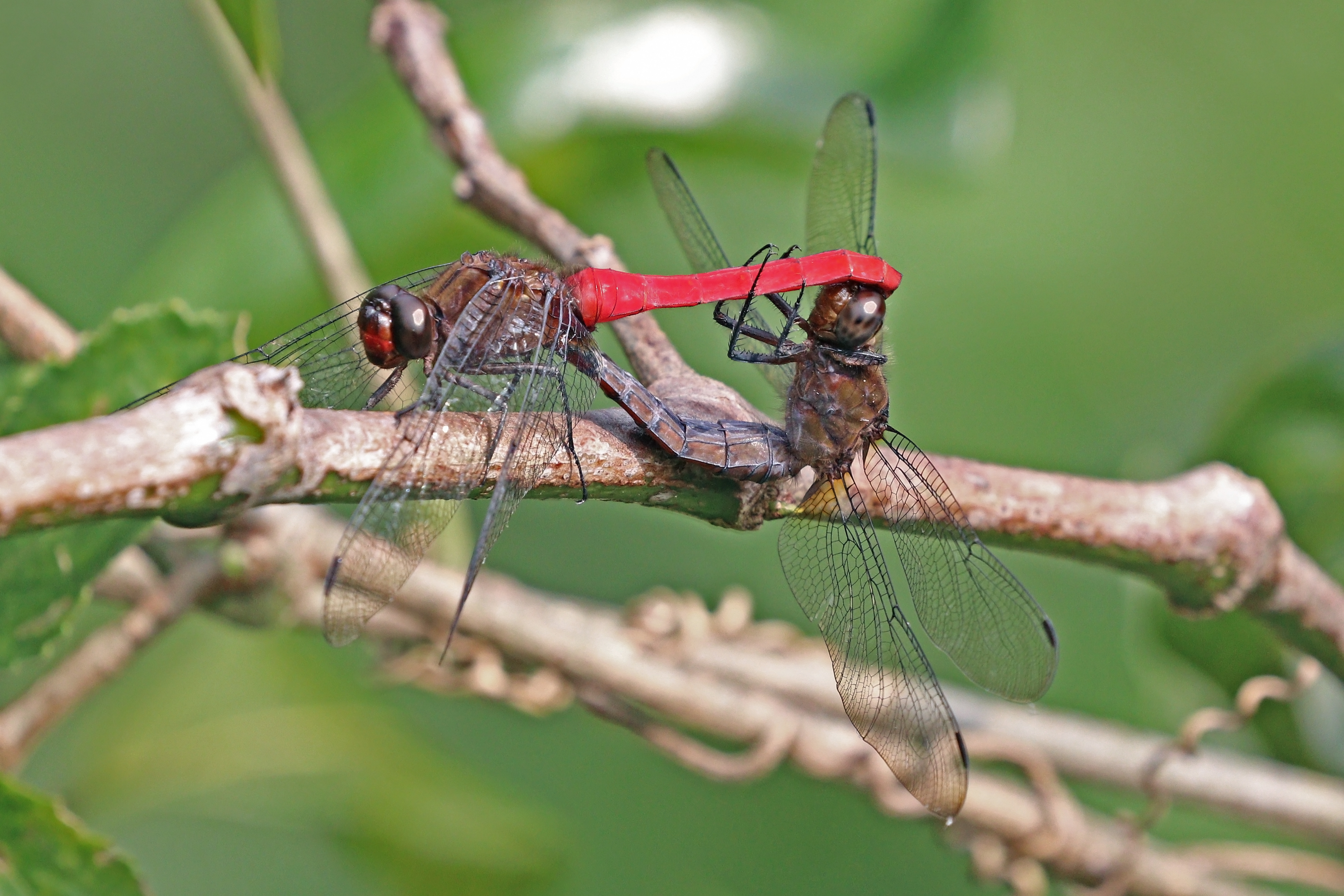
Mating, India

== See also ==
- List of odonates of Sri Lanka
- List of odonates of India
- List of odonata of Kerala
