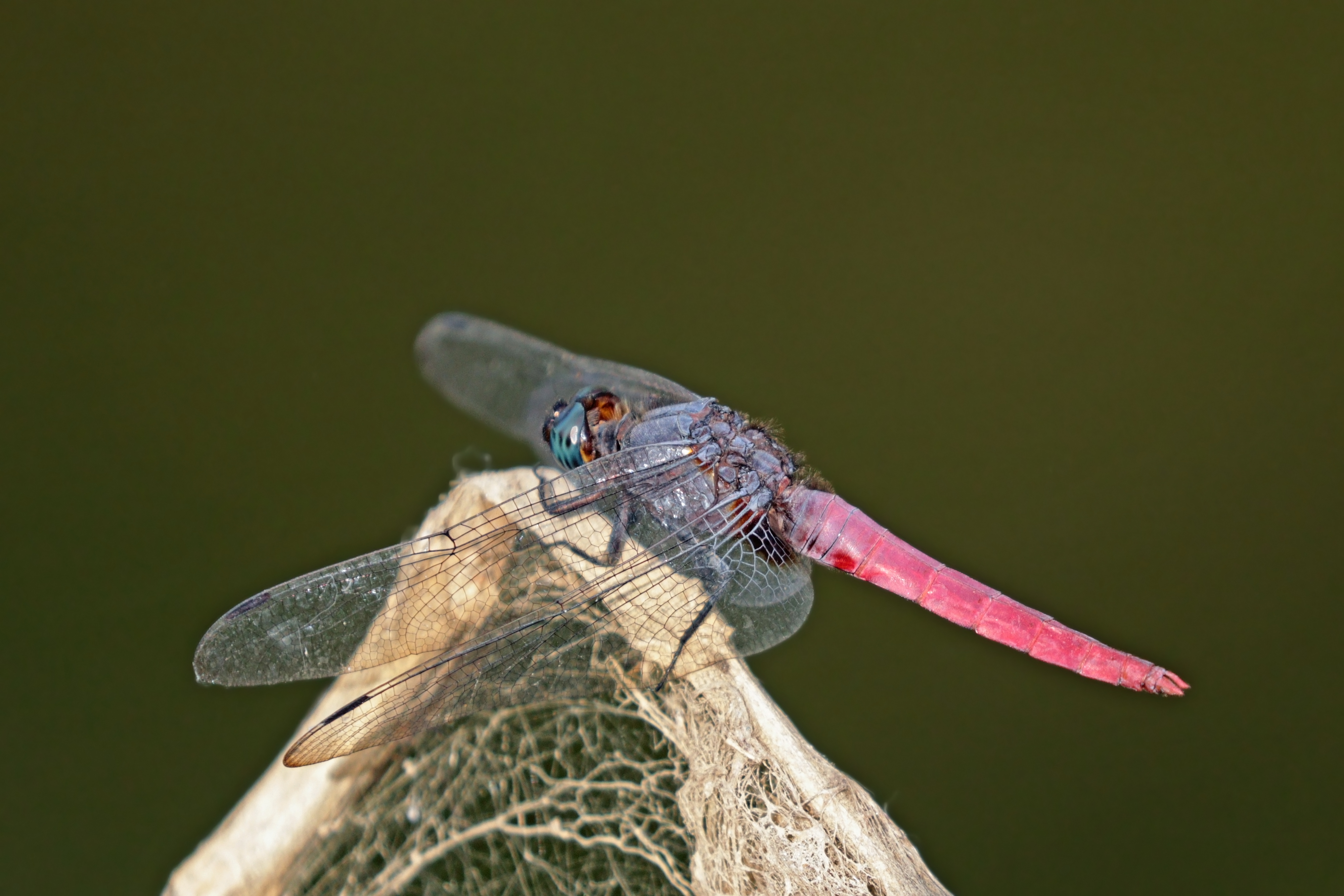
- Male
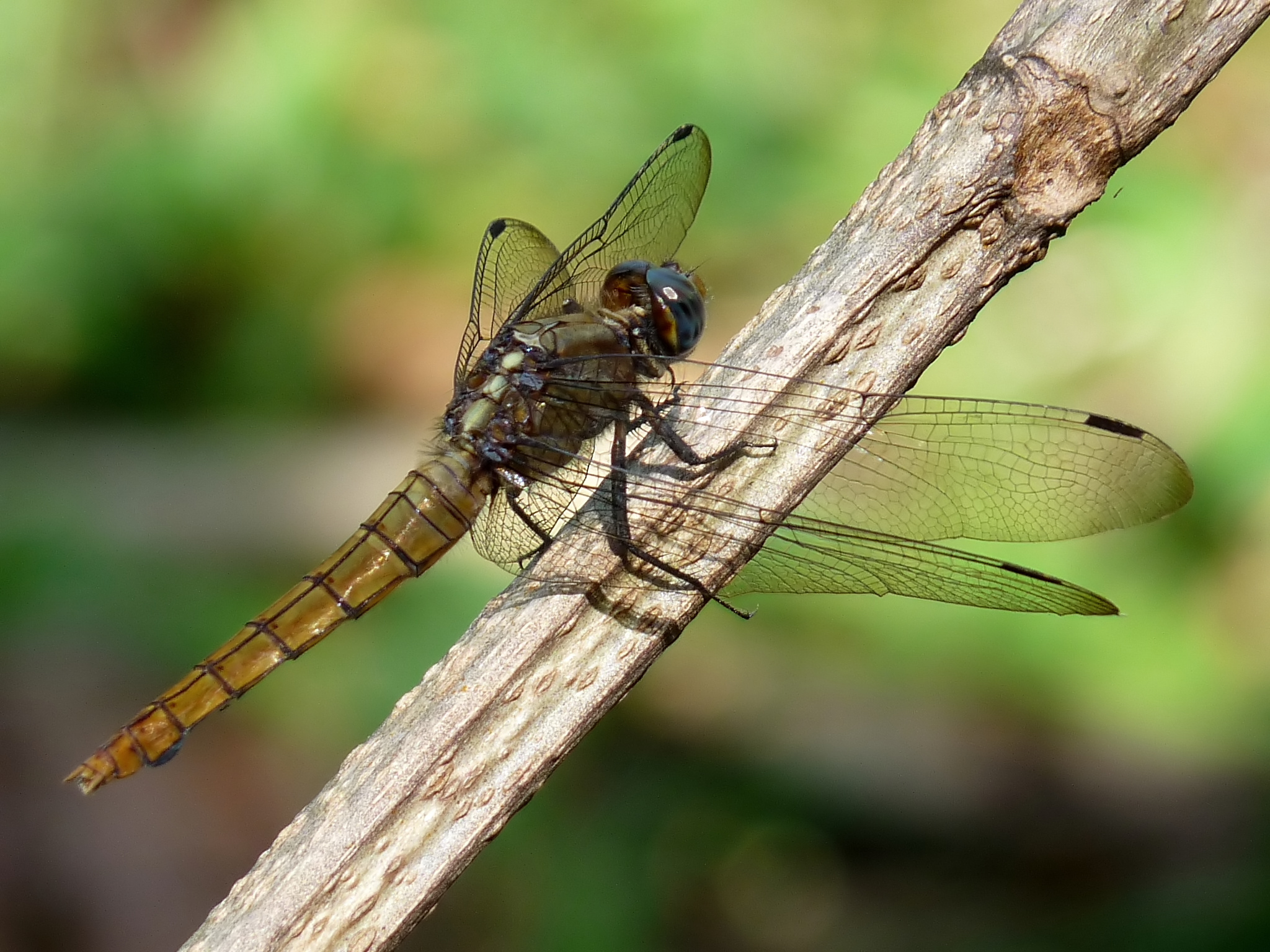
- Female

Conservation status
- Least Concern (IUCN 3.1)

Scientific classification
- Kingdom: Animalia
- Phylum: Arthropoda
- Clade: Pancrustacea
- Class: Insecta
- Order: Odonata
- Infraorder: Anisoptera
- Superfamily: Libelluloidea
- Family: Libellulidae
- Genus: Orthetrum
- Species: O. pruinosum

Binomial name
- Orthetrum pruinosum (Burmeister, 1839)

Synonyms
- Libellula petalura Brauer, 1865; Orthetrum petalura Kirby, 1890

= Orthetrum pruinosum =

Species of dragonfly

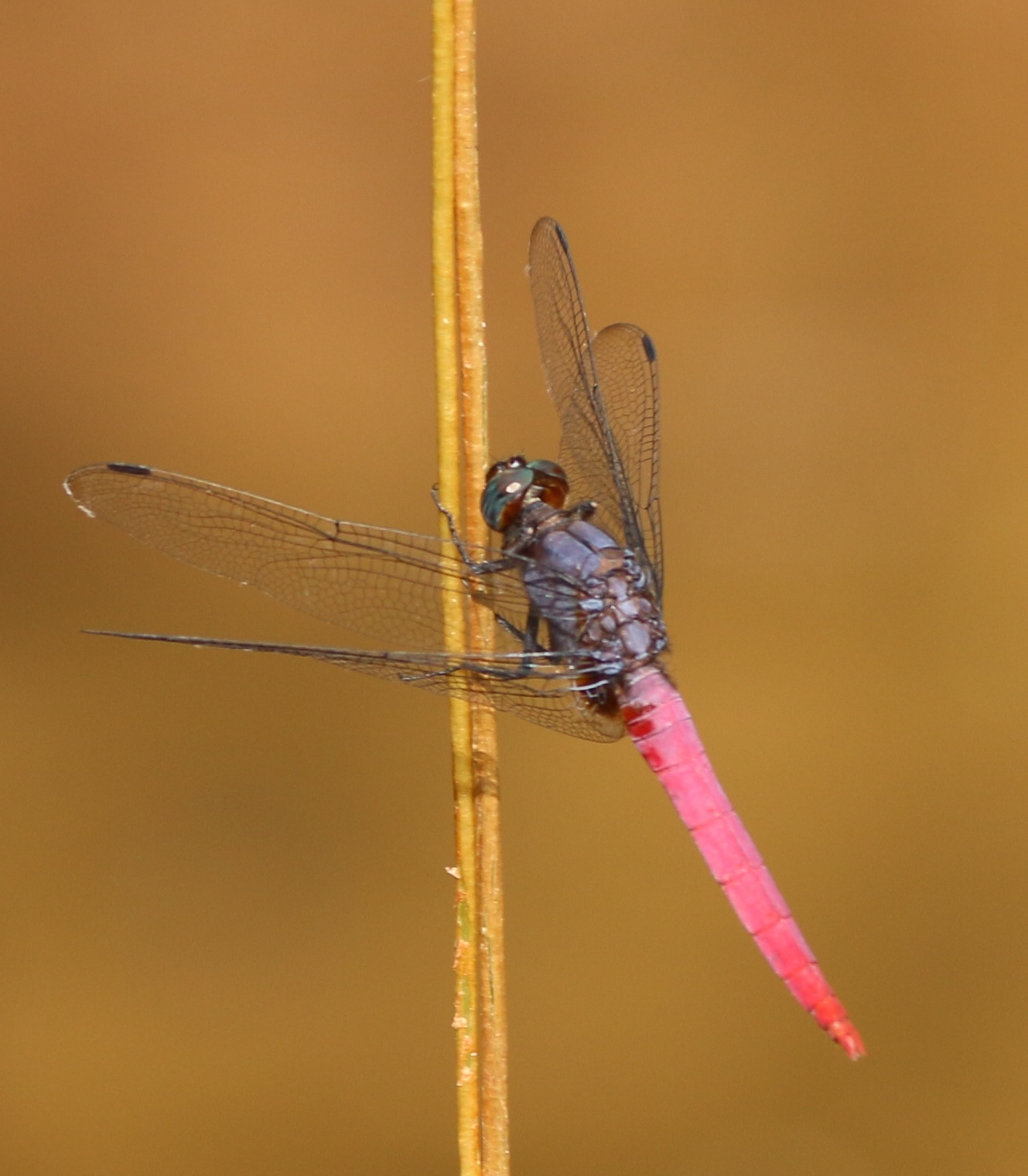
Crimson-tailed Marsh Hawk, Orthetrum pruinosum

Orthetrum pruinosum, the crimson-tailed marsh hawk, is a species of dragonfly in the family Libellulidae. It is a widespread species occurring from west India to Japan and south to Java and the Sunda Islands. A molecular phylogenetics study of Orthetrum dragonflies revealed that Orthetrum pruinosum is a cryptic species.

== Subspecies ==
Three subspecies are recognized.

- O. p. neglectum (mainland Asia)
- O. p. schneideri (Malay peninsula and Borneo)
- O. p. clelia (Philippines and Taiwan)

== Description and habitat ==
It is a medium-sized dragonfly with dark thorax with slight purple pruinescence and purple colored abdomen. Young males have red abdomen as in Orthetrum chrysis. Females of both species look similar. It breeds in ponds, lakes and sluggish streams.

== See also ==
- List of odonates of Sri Lanka
- List of odonates of India
- List of odonata of Kerala
