= List of dragonflies (Synthemistidae) =

Synthemistidae is a family of dragonflies. The following is a list of species belonging to this family.

== Species ==
- Austrosynthemis cyanitincta
- Choristhemis flavoterminata
- Choristhemis olivei
- Eusynthemis aurolineata
- Eusynthemis barbarae
- Eusynthemis brevistyla
- Eusynthemis deniseae
- Eusynthemis frontalis
- Eusynthemis guttata
- Eusynthemis netta
- Eusynthemis nigra
- Eusynthemis rentziana
- Eusynthemis tenera
- Eusynthemis tillyardi
- Eusynthemis ursa
- Eusynthemis ursula
- Eusynthemis virgula
- Palaeosynthemis alecto
- Palaeosynthemis cervula
- Palaeosynthemis cyrene
- Palaeosynthemis evelynae
- Palaeosynthemis gracilenta
- Palaeosynthemis kimminsi
- Palaeosynthemis primigenia
- Palaeosynthemis wollastoni
- Synthemiopsis gomphomacromioides
- Synthemis ariadne
- Synthemis campioni
- Synthemis eustalacta
- Synthemis fenella
- Synthemis feronia
- Synthemis flexicauda
- Synthemis leachii
- Synthemis macrostigma
- Synthemis miranda
- Synthemis montaguei
- Synthemis pamelae
- Synthemis regina
- Synthemis serendipita
- Synthemis spiniger
- Synthemis tasmanica
- Tonyosynthemis claviculata
- Tonyosynthemis ofarrelli
