= Eusynthemis rentziana =

Swift tigertail

Conservation status
- Least Concern (IUCN 3.1)

Scientific classification
- Kingdom: Animalia
- Phylum: Arthropoda
- Clade: Pancrustacea
- Class: Insecta
- Order: Odonata
- Suborder: Anisoptera
- Superfamily: Libelluloidea
- Family: Synthemistidae
- Genus: Eusynthemis
- Species: E. rentziana

Binomial name
- Eusynthemis rentziana Theischinger, 1998

Species of dragonfly

Eusynthemis rentziana is a species of dragonfly of the family Synthemistidae, known as the swift tigertail. It is a slender, medium-sized dragonfly with black and yellow markings. It inhabits streams in eastern Australia

Eusynthemis rentziana appears similar to Eusynthemis guttata which is found in streams of south-eastern Australia.

== Etymology ==
The genus name Eusynthemis combines the Greek εὖ (eu, "well") with Synthemis, an existing genus of dragonflies, referring to a more developed form compared with other members of Synthemis.

In 1998, Günther Theischinger named this species rentziana, an eponym honouring the orthopterist David Rentz, who recorded the species south of the Hunter River in New South Wales.

== Gallery ==
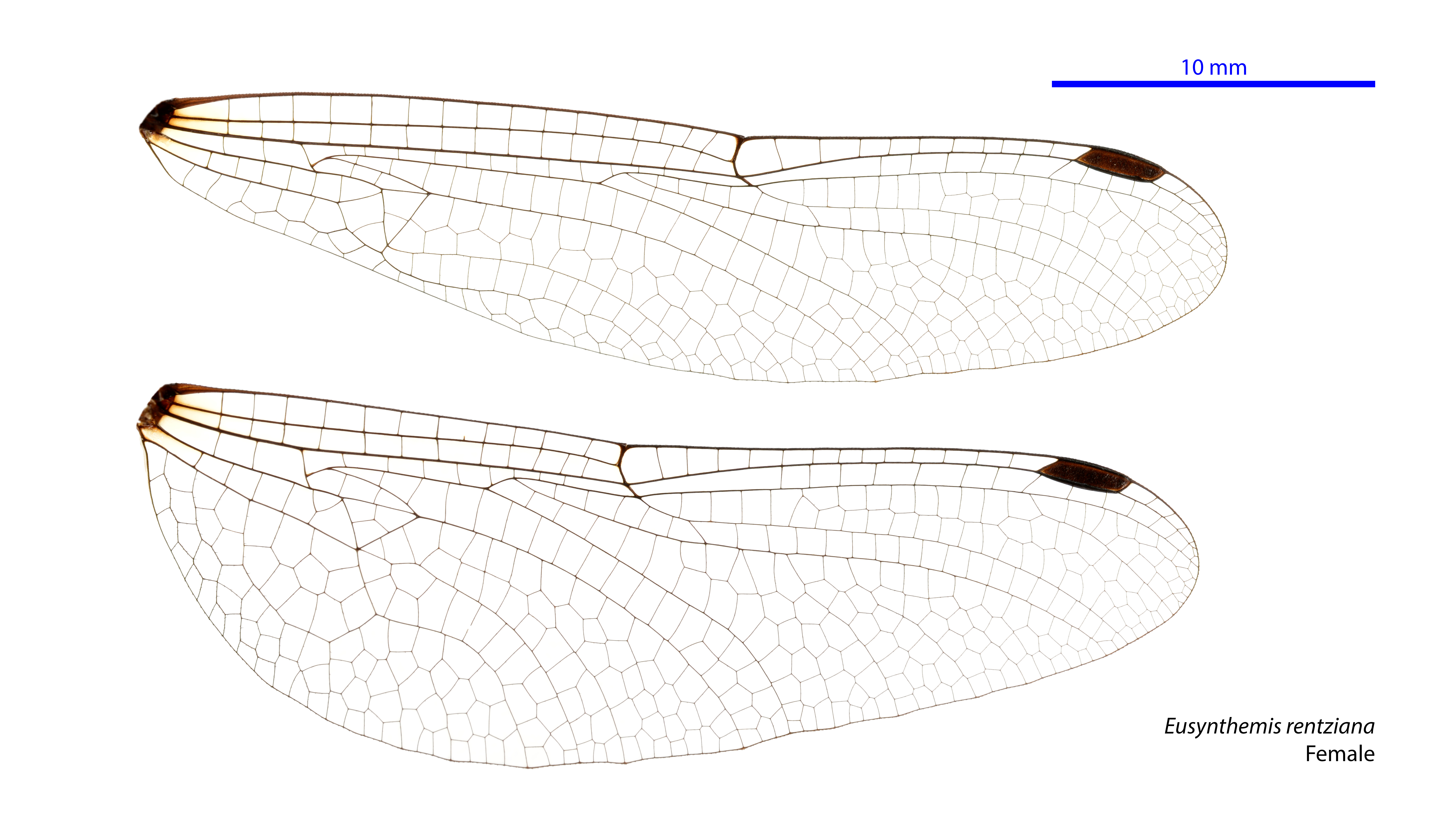
Female wings

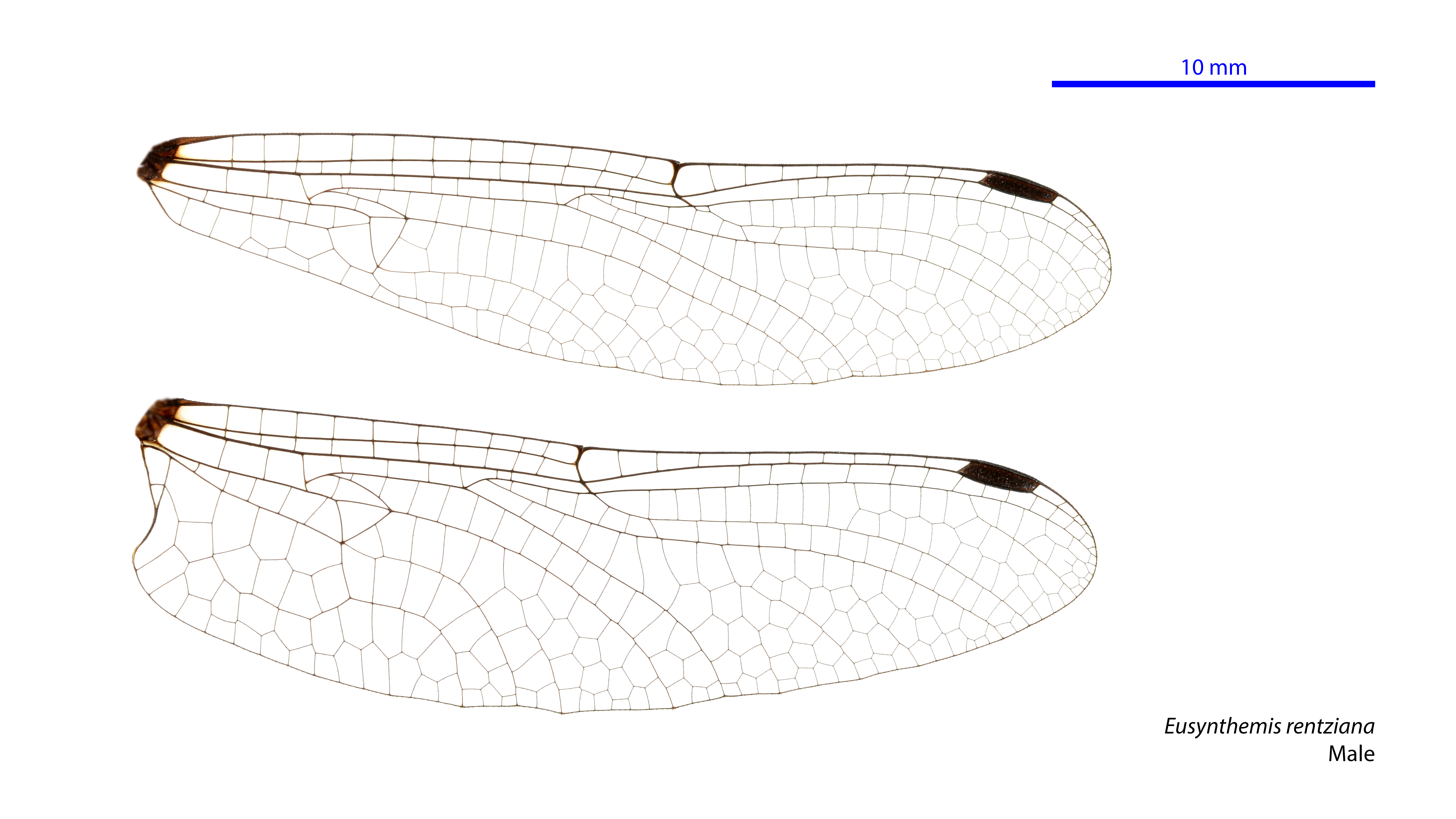
Male wings

== See also ==
- List of Odonata species of Australia
