= Eusynthemis tenera =

Rainforest tigertail

Conservation status
- Data Deficient (IUCN 3.1)

Scientific classification
- Kingdom: Animalia
- Phylum: Arthropoda
- Clade: Pancrustacea
- Class: Insecta
- Order: Odonata
- Suborder: Anisoptera
- Superfamily: Libelluloidea
- Family: Synthemistidae
- Genus: Eusynthemis
- Species: E. tenera

Binomial name
- Eusynthemis tenera Theischinger, 1995

Species of dragonfly

Eusynthemis tenera is a species of dragonfly of the family Synthemistidae, known as the rainforest tigertail. It is a medium-sized dragonfly with black and yellow markings. It inhabits rainforest streams in north-eastern Australia

Eusynthemis tenera appears similar to Eusynthemis guttata which is found in alpine streams.

== Etymology ==
The genus name Eusynthemis combines the Greek εὖ (eu, "well") with Synthemis, an existing genus of dragonflies, referring to a more developed form compared with other members of Synthemis.

The species name tenera is derived from the Latin tener ("delicate" or "tender").

== Gallery ==
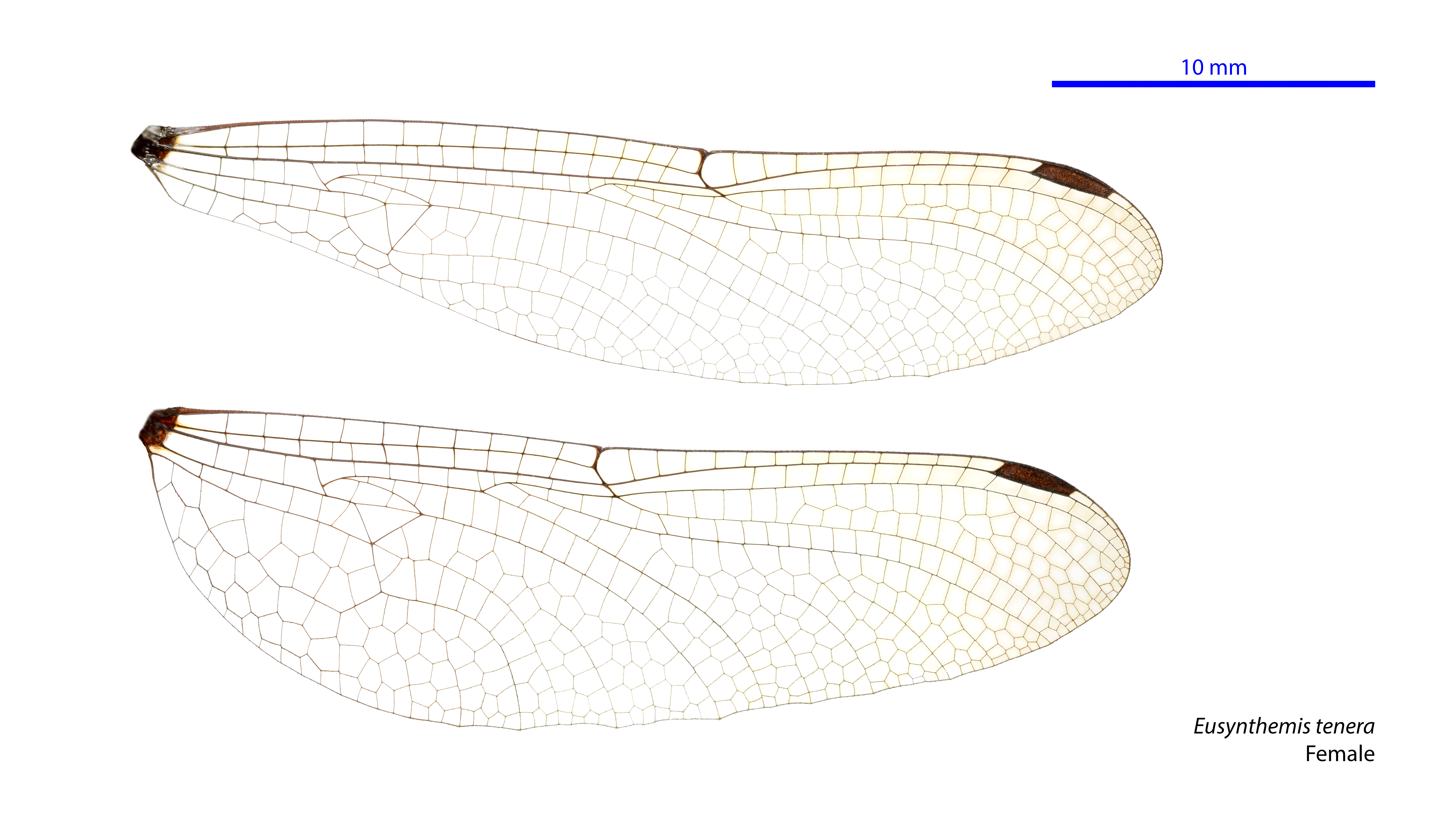
Female wings

== See also ==
- List of Odonata species of Australia
