= Eusynthemis ursula =

Beech tigertail

Conservation status
- Data Deficient (IUCN 3.1)

Scientific classification
- Kingdom: Animalia
- Phylum: Arthropoda
- Clade: Pancrustacea
- Class: Insecta
- Order: Odonata
- Suborder: Anisoptera
- Superfamily: Libelluloidea
- Family: Synthemistidae
- Genus: Eusynthemis
- Species: E. ursula

Binomial name
- Eusynthemis ursula Theischinger, 1998

Species of dragonfly

Eusynthemis ursula is a species of dragonfly of the family Synthemistidae, known as the Beech tigertail. It is a slender, medium-sized dragonfly with black and yellow markings. It has been found near the source of small streams at altitude in the vicinity of Barrington Tops, New South Wales, Australia

Eusynthemis ursula appears similar to Eusynthemis ursa which is also found at altitude in a similar vicinity in Australia.

== Etymology ==
The genus name Eusynthemis combines the Greek εὖ (eu, "well") with Synthemis, an existing genus of dragonflies, referring to a more developed form compared with other members of Synthemis.

In 1998, Günther Theischinger named this species ursula, an eponym honouring his granddaughter Ursula.

== Gallery ==
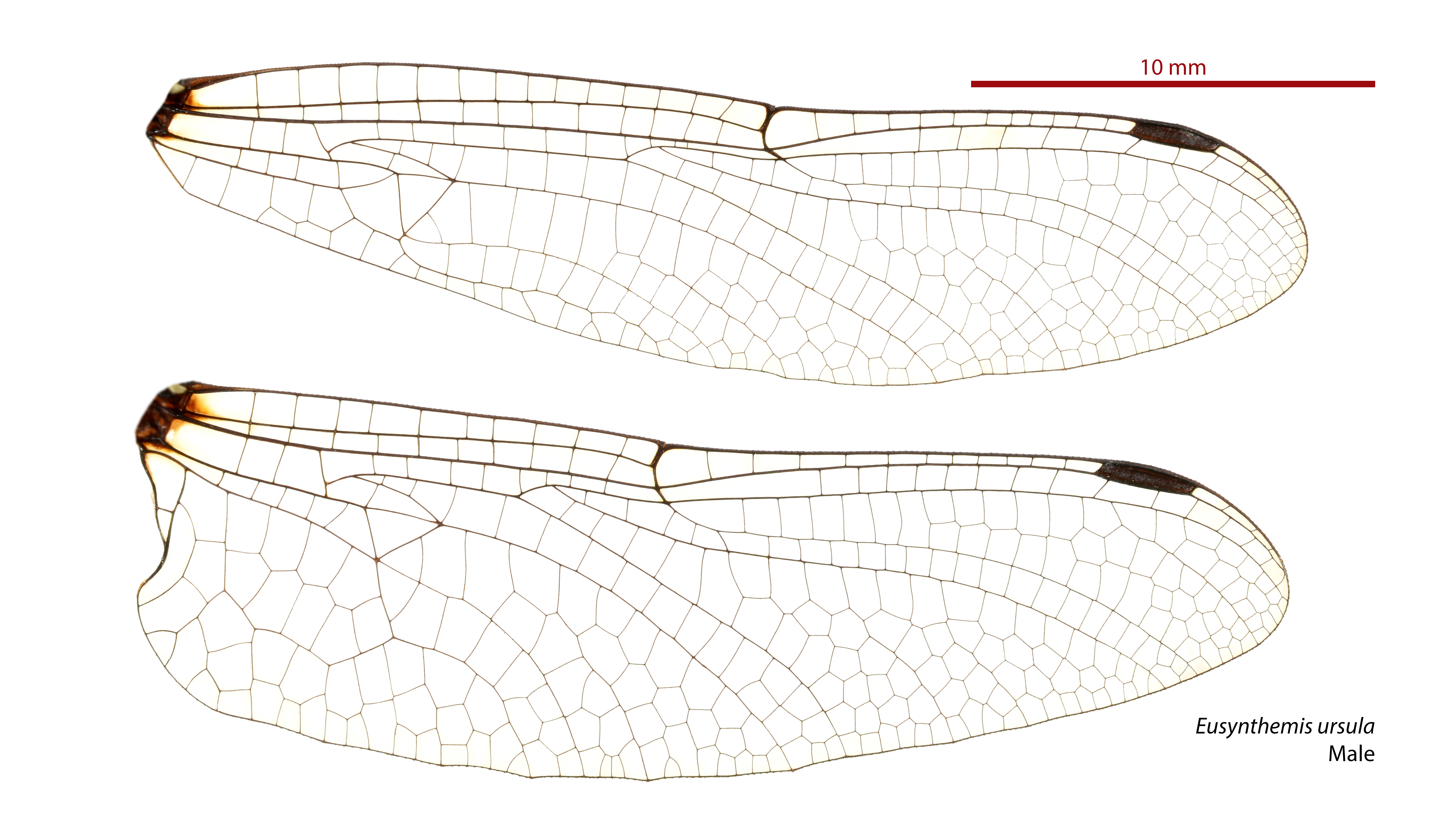
Male wings

== See also ==
- List of Odonata species of Australia
