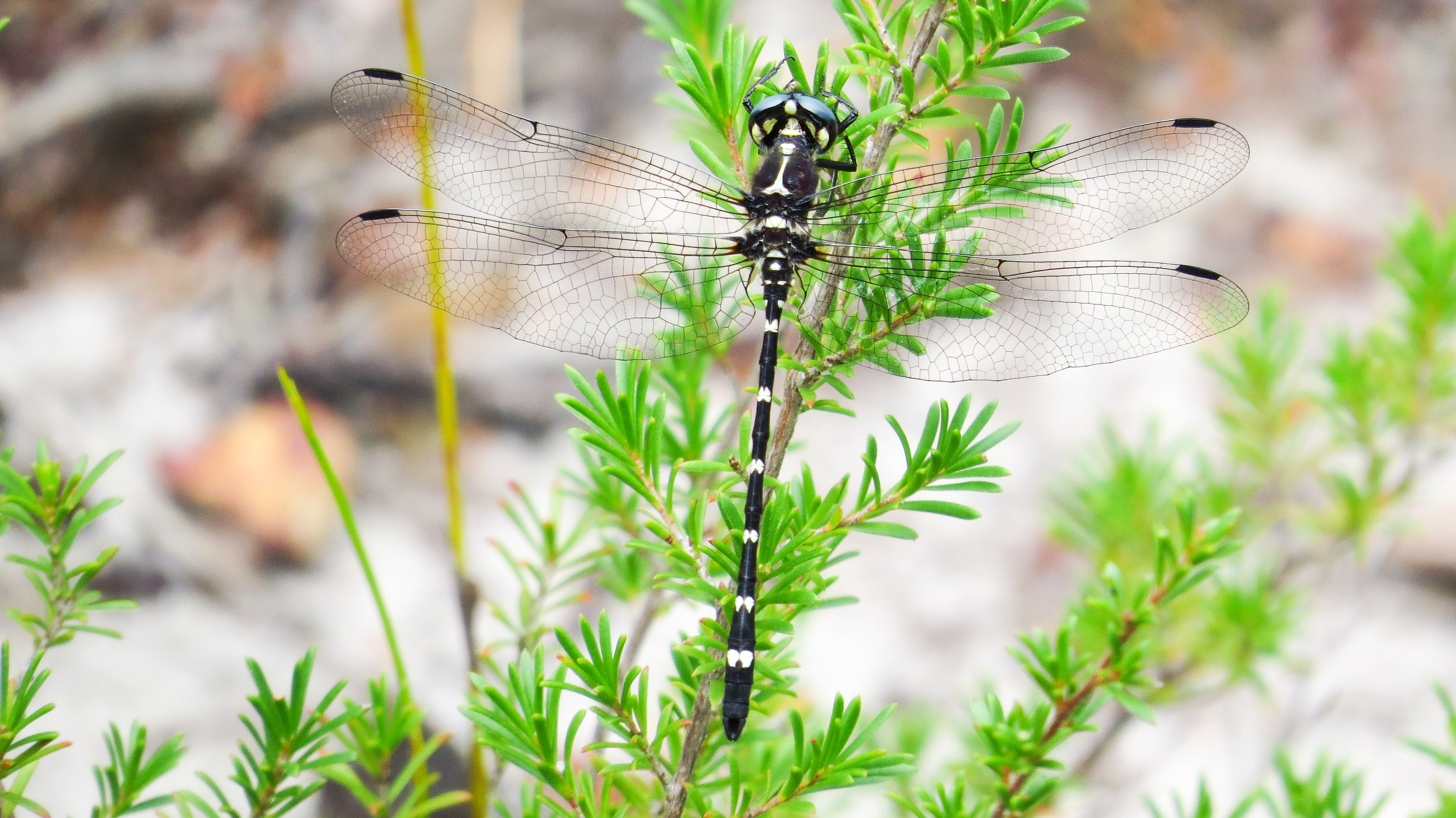
- Male

Conservation status
- Least Concern (IUCN 3.1)

Scientific classification
- Kingdom: Animalia
- Phylum: Arthropoda
- Clade: Pancrustacea
- Class: Insecta
- Order: Odonata
- Suborder: Anisoptera
- Superfamily: Libelluloidea
- Family: Synthemistidae
- Genus: Eusynthemis
- Species: E. tillyardi

Binomial name
- Eusynthemis tillyardi Theischinger, 1995

= Eusynthemis tillyardi =

Mountain tigertail

Species of dragonfly

Eusynthemis tillyardi is a species of dragonfly of the family Synthemistidae, known as the mountain tigertail. It is a medium-sized dragonfly with black and yellow markings. It inhabits coastal and mountain streams in south-eastern Australia

Eusynthemis tillyardi appears similar to Eusynthemis guttata which is found in alpine streams.

== Etymology ==
The genus name Eusynthemis combines the Greek εὖ (eu, "well") with Synthemis, an existing genus of dragonflies, referring to a more developed form compared with other members of Synthemis.

In 1995, Günther Theischinger named this species tillyardi, an eponym honouring the late odonatologist Robin Tillyard (1881–1937) for establishing the framework of the Australian dragonfly fauna.

== Gallery ==
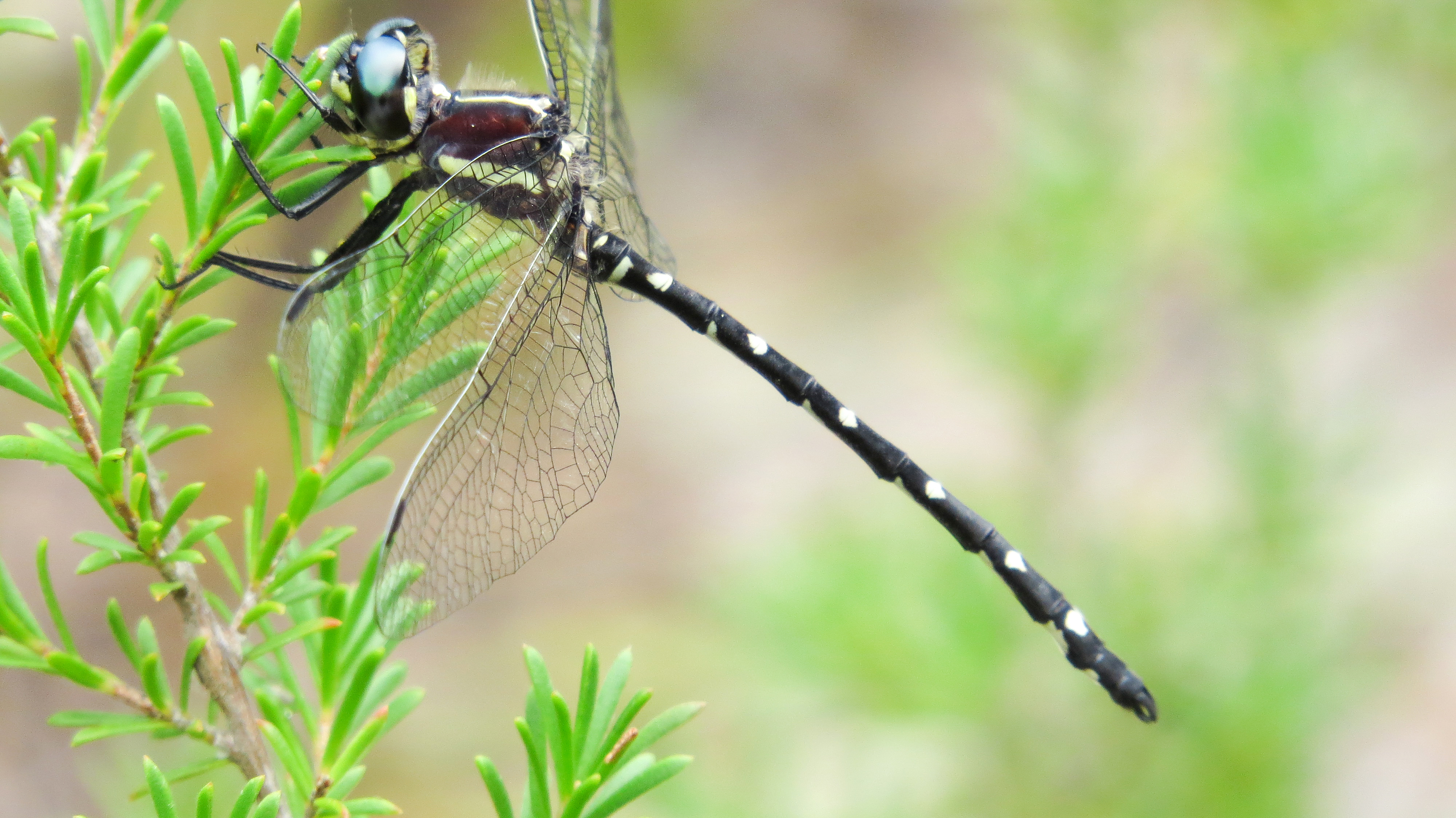
Male Mountain Tigertail with a cream stripe on the side of his body

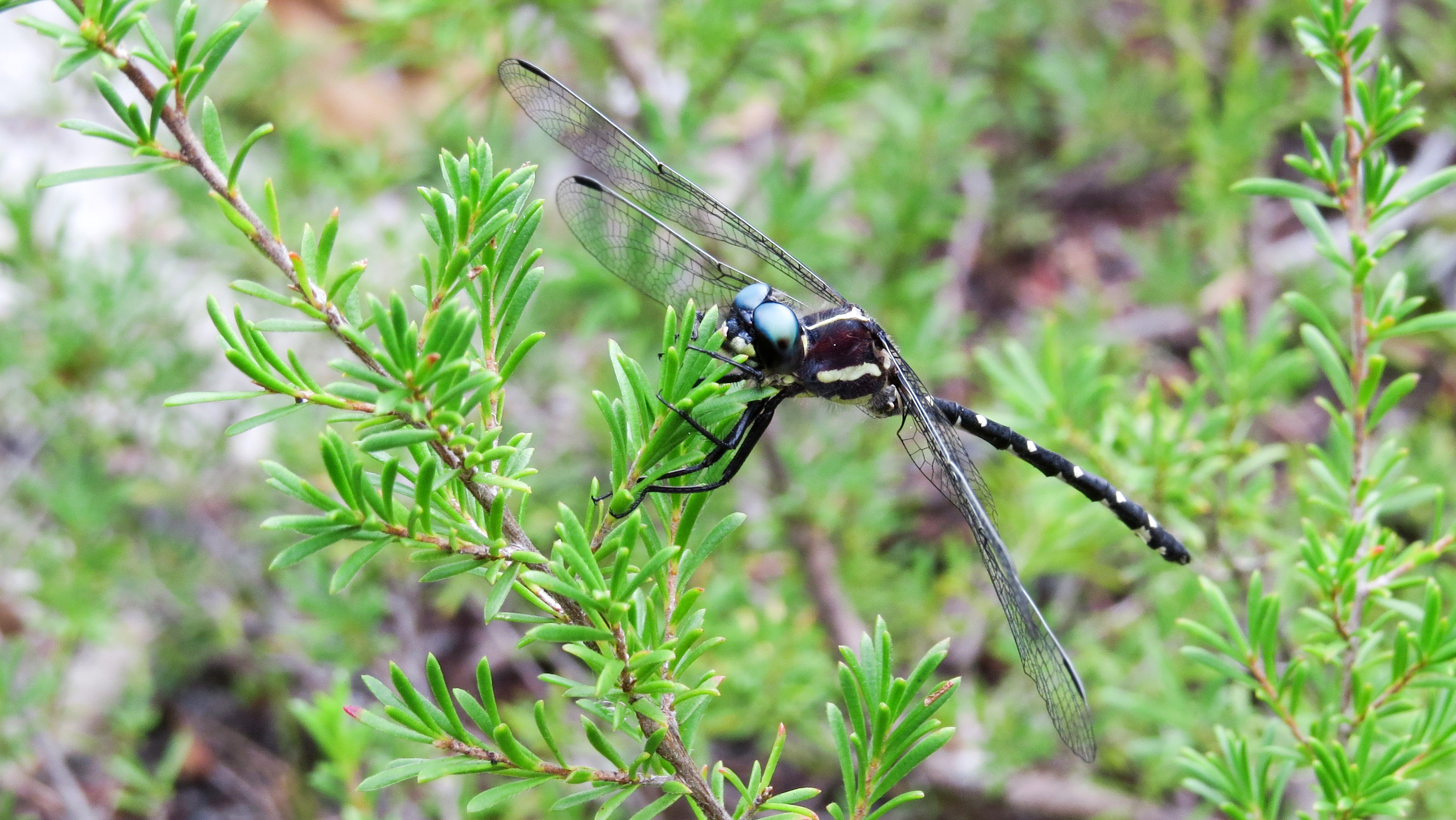
Male with pale blue eyes

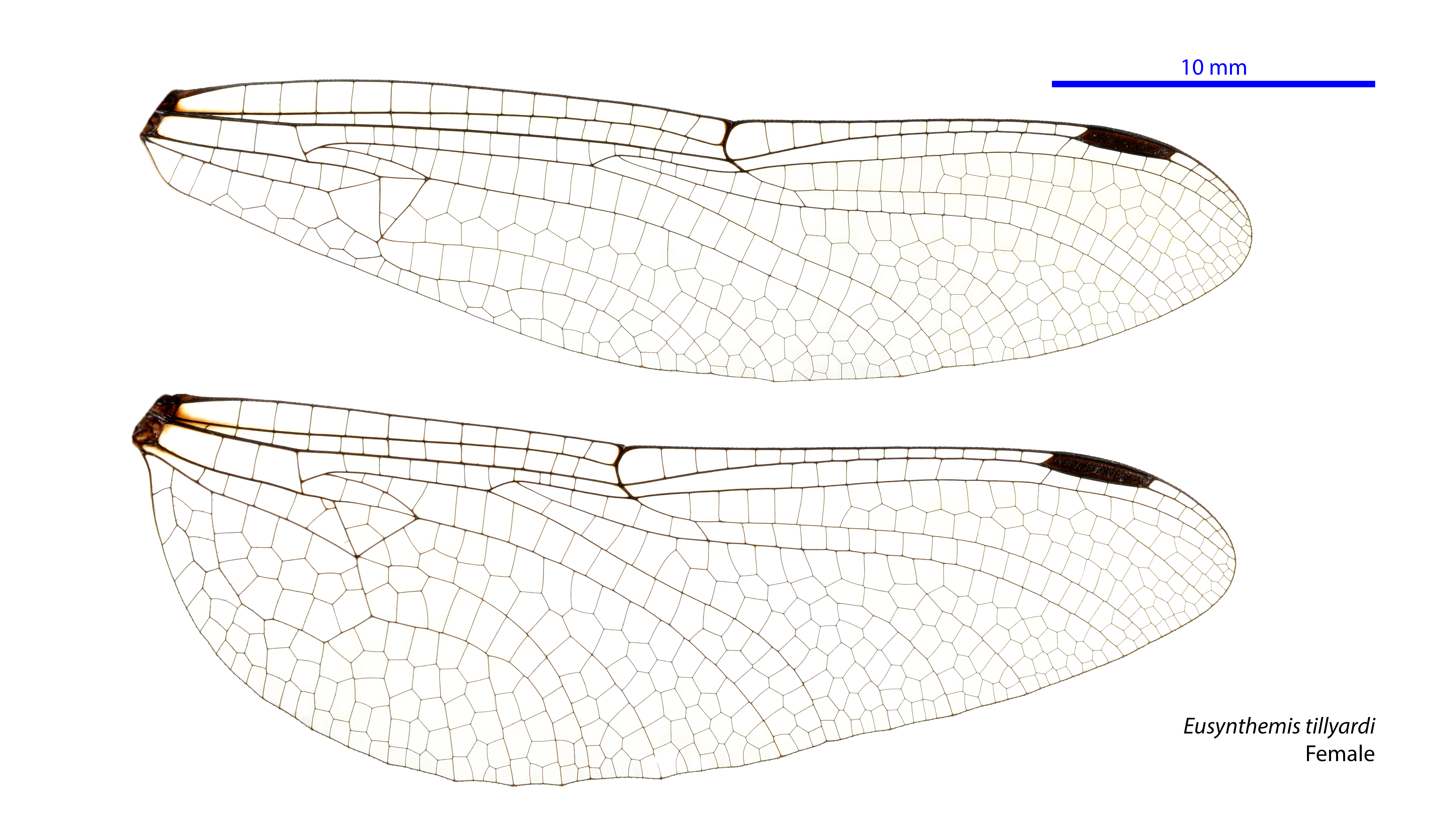
Female wings

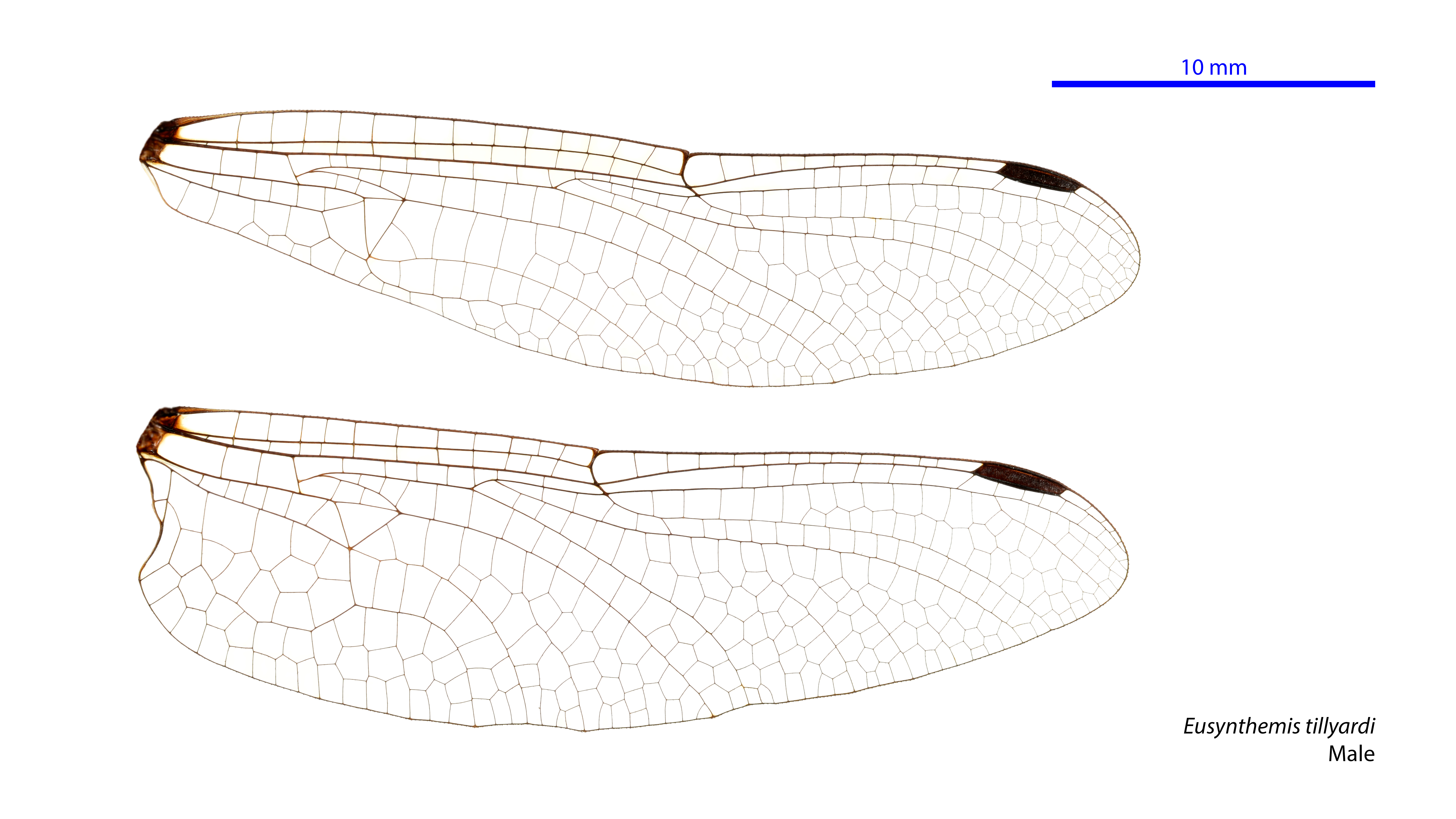
Male wings

== See also ==
- List of Odonata species of Australia
