= Eusynthemis cooloola =

Cooloola tigertail

Conservation status
- Data Deficient (IUCN 3.1)

Scientific classification
- Kingdom: Animalia
- Phylum: Arthropoda
- Clade: Pancrustacea
- Class: Insecta
- Order: Odonata
- Suborder: Anisoptera
- Superfamily: Libelluloidea
- Family: Synthemistidae
- Genus: Eusynthemis
- Species: E. cooloola

Binomial name
- Eusynthemis cooloola Theischinger, 2018

Species of dragonfly

Eusynthemis cooloola is a species of dragonfly of the family Synthemistidae, known as the Cooloola tigertail. It is a medium-sized dragonfly with black and yellow markings. It has been found along a creek in the Cooloola sand-mass of south-eastern Queensland, Australia.

== Etymology ==
The genus name Eusynthemis combines the Greek εὖ (eu, "well") with Synthemis, an existing genus of dragonflies, referring to a more developed form compared with other members of Synthemis.

The species name cooloola is named for the Cooloola sand mass, part of Great Sandy National Park in south-eastern Queensland, where the species occurs.

== See also ==
- List of Odonata species of Australia
