= Eusynthemis barbarae =

Mount Lewis tigertail

Conservation status
- Data Deficient (IUCN 3.1)

Scientific classification
- Kingdom: Animalia
- Phylum: Arthropoda
- Clade: Pancrustacea
- Class: Insecta
- Order: Odonata
- Suborder: Anisoptera
- Superfamily: Libelluloidea
- Family: Synthemistidae
- Genus: Eusynthemis
- Species: E. barbarae

Binomial name
- Eusynthemis barbarae (Moulds, 1985)

Synonyms
- Choristhemis barbarae Moulds, 1985

Species of dragonfly

Eusynthemis barbarae is a species of dragonfly of the family Synthemistidae, known as the Mount Lewis tigertail. It is a medium-sized dragonfly with black and yellow markings. It inhabits rainforest streams in north-eastern Australia

Eusynthemis barbarae appears similar to Eusynthemis guttata which is found in streams of south-eastern Australia.

== Etymology ==
The genus name Eusynthemis combines the Greek εὖ (eu, "well") with Synthemis, an existing genus of dragonflies, referring to a more developed form compared with other members of Synthemis.

In 1985, Max Moulds named this species barbarae, an eponym honouring his wife Barbara, in recognition of her considerable assistance with field collecting over many years.

== Gallery ==
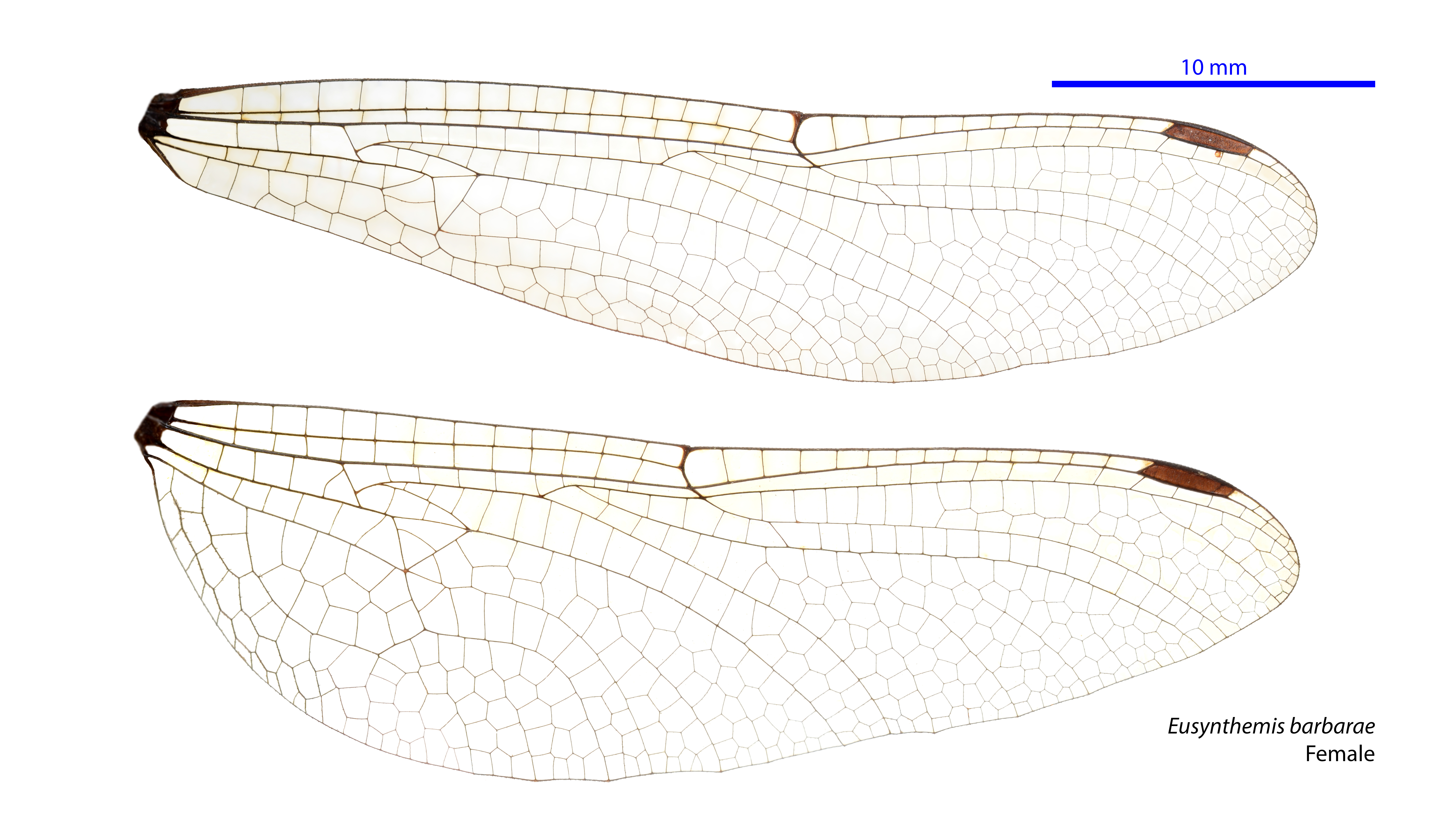
Female wings

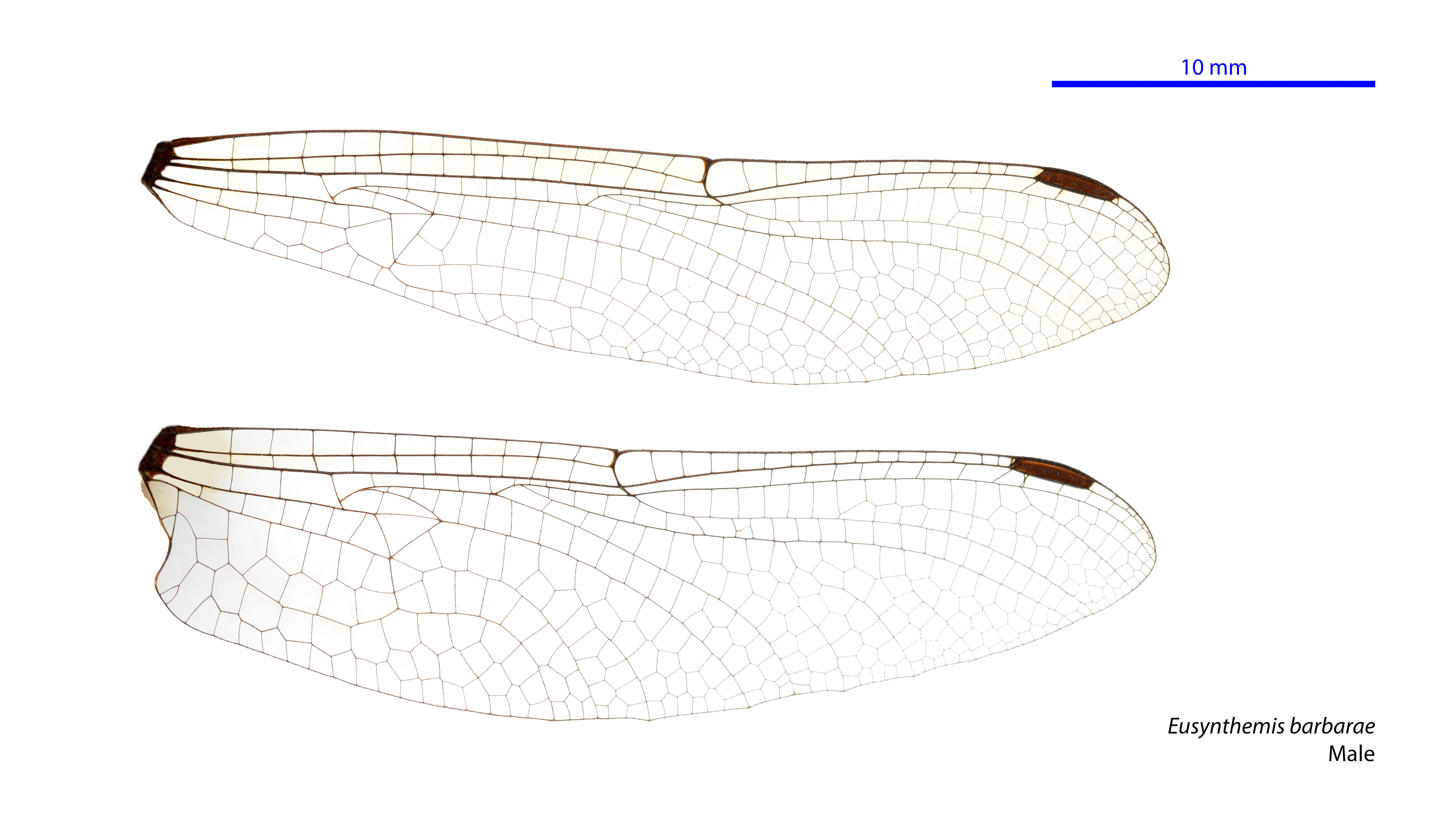
Male wings

== See also ==
- List of Odonata species of Australia
