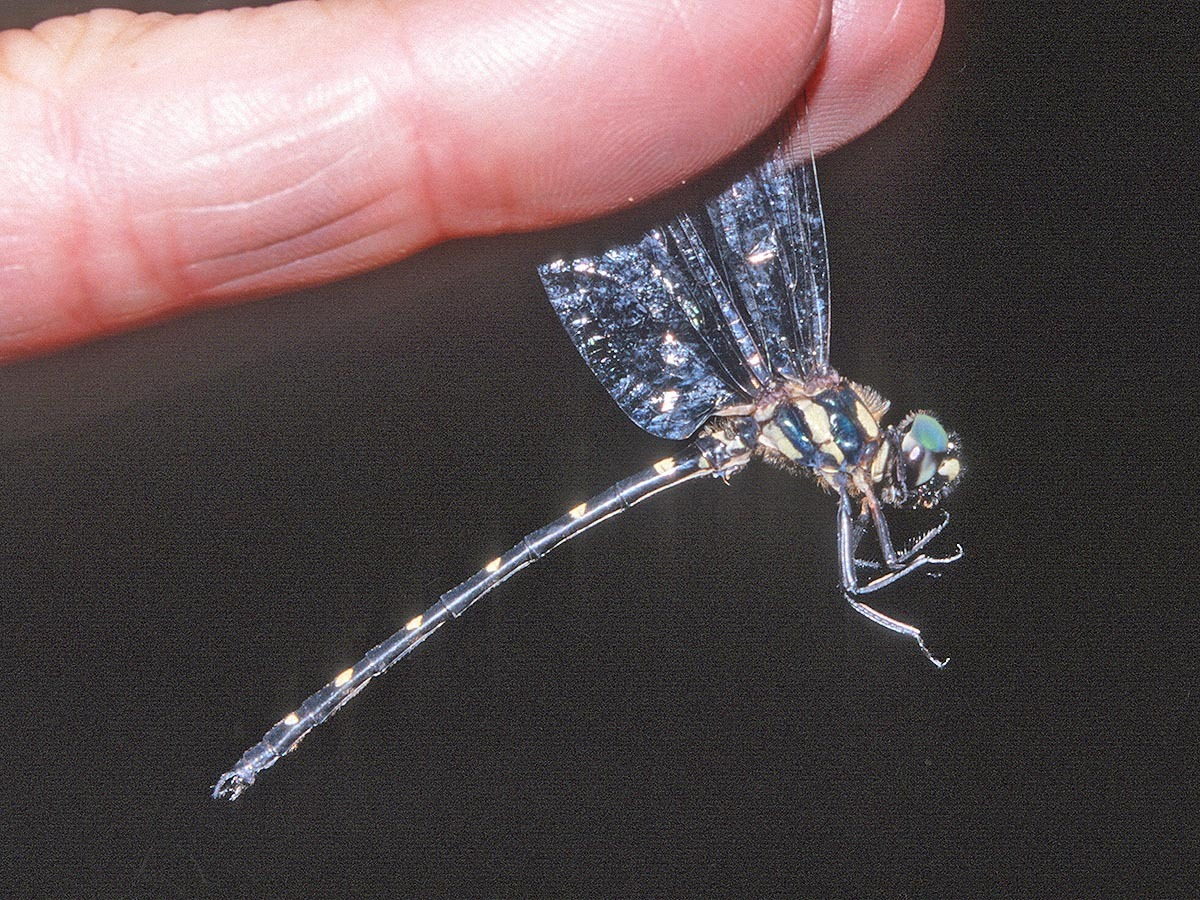

Conservation status
- Data Deficient (IUCN 3.1)

Scientific classification
- Kingdom: Animalia
- Phylum: Arthropoda
- Clade: Pancrustacea
- Class: Insecta
- Order: Odonata
- Suborder: Anisoptera
- Superfamily: Libelluloidea
- Family: Synthemistidae
- Genus: Eusynthemis
- Species: E. netta

Binomial name
- Eusynthemis netta Theischinger, 1999

= Eusynthemis netta =

Pretty tigertail

Species of dragonfly

Eusynthemis netta is a species of dragonfly of the family Synthemistidae, known as the pretty tigertail. It is a medium-sized dragonfly with black and yellow markings. It inhabits rainforest streams in north-eastern Australia

== Etymology ==
The genus name Eusynthemis combines the Greek εὖ (eu, "well") with Synthemis, an existing genus of dragonflies, referring to a more developed form compared with other members of Synthemis.

In 1999, Günther Theischinger named this species netta, an eponym honouring Annette (Netta) Smith, who collected original specimens of the species.

== See also ==
- List of Odonata species of Australia
