= Eusynthemis aurolineata =

Variable tigertail

Conservation status
- Least Concern (IUCN 3.1)

Scientific classification
- Kingdom: Animalia
- Phylum: Arthropoda
- Clade: Pancrustacea
- Class: Insecta
- Order: Odonata
- Suborder: Anisoptera
- Superfamily: Libelluloidea
- Family: Synthemistidae
- Genus: Eusynthemis
- Species: E. aurolineata

Binomial name
- Eusynthemis aurolineata (Tillyard, 1913)

Synonyms
- Metathemis guttata aurolineata Tillyard, 1913; Metathemis guttata melanosoma Tillyard, 1913

Species of dragonfly

Eusynthemis aurolineata is a species of dragonfly of the family Synthemistidae, known as the variable tigertail. It is a medium-sized dragonfly with black and yellow markings. It inhabits mountain swamps and streams in eastern Australia

Eusynthemis aurolineata appears similar to Eusynthemis guttata which is found in alpine streams.

== Etymology ==
The genus name Eusynthemis combines the Greek εὖ (eu, "well") with Synthemis, an existing genus of dragonflies, referring to a more developed form compared with other members of Synthemis.

The species name aurolineata is derived from the Latin aureus ("golden" or "adorned with gold") and linea ("line"), referring to the pair of golden or yellow lines on the thorax.

== Gallery ==
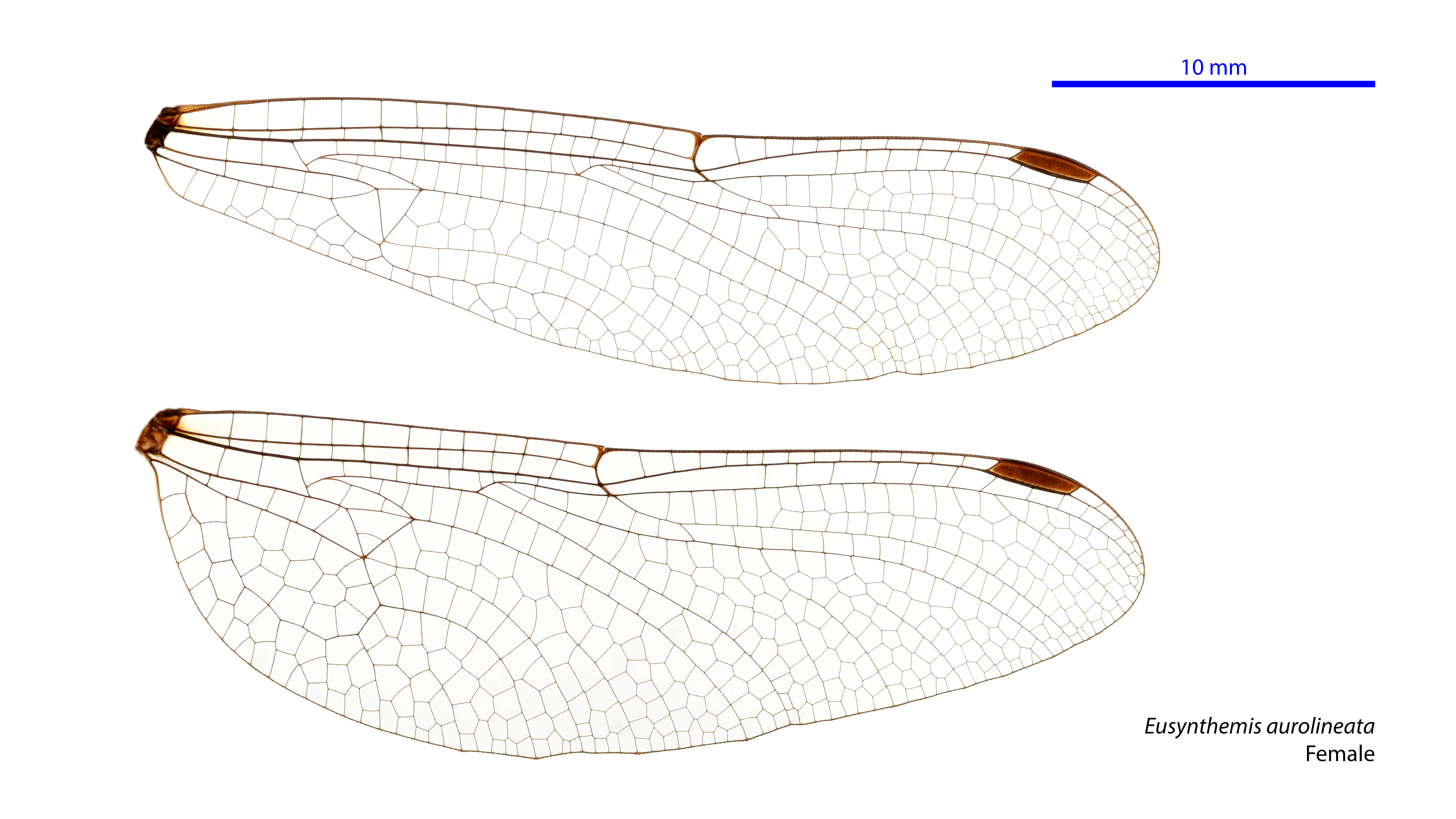
Female wings

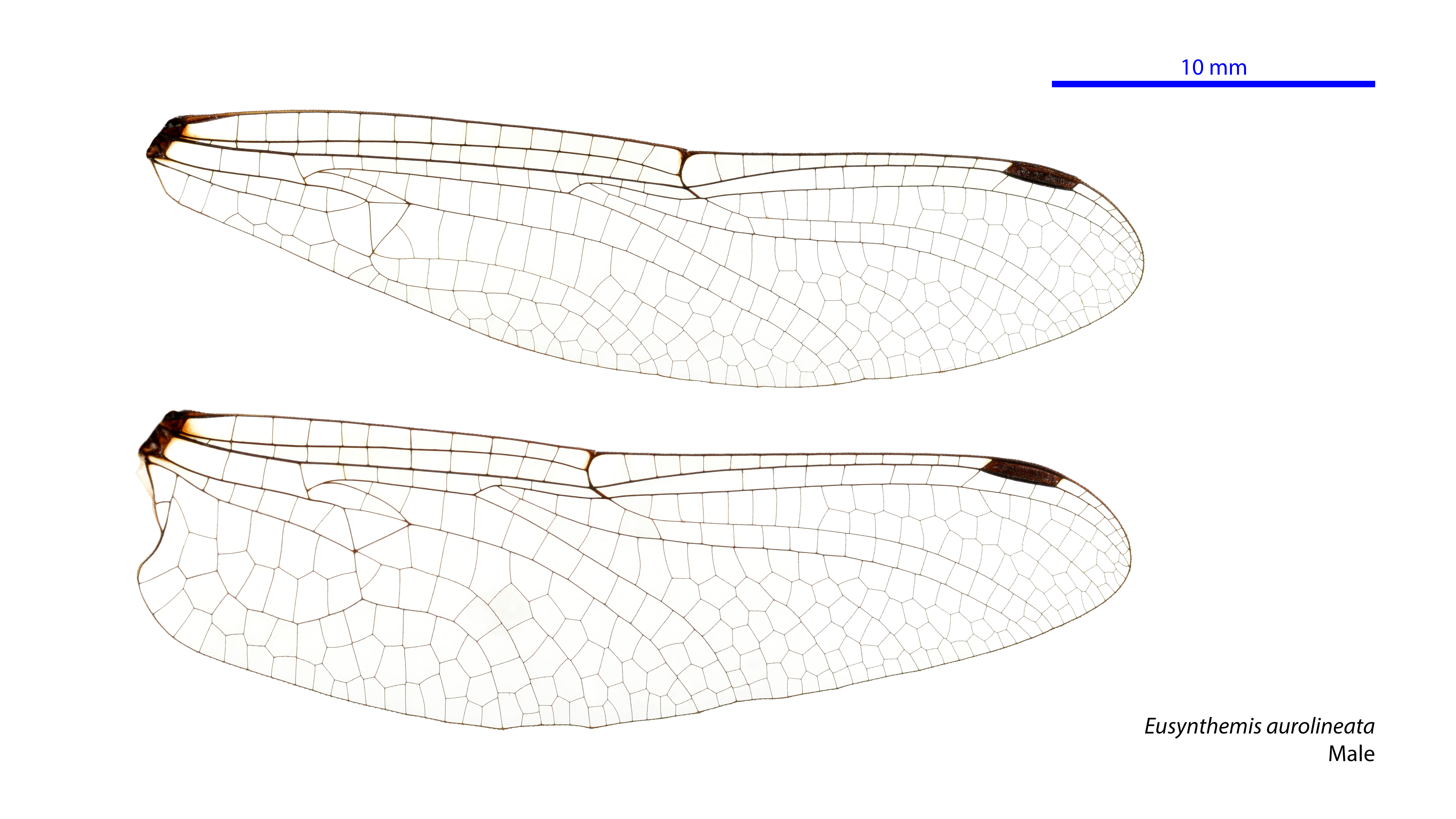
Male wings

== See also ==
- List of Odonata species of Australia
