= Eusynthemis deniseae =

Carnarvon tigertail

Conservation status
- Vulnerable (IUCN 3.1)

Scientific classification
- Kingdom: Animalia
- Phylum: Arthropoda
- Clade: Pancrustacea
- Class: Insecta
- Order: Odonata
- Suborder: Anisoptera
- Superfamily: Libelluloidea
- Family: Synthemistidae
- Genus: Eusynthemis
- Species: E. deniseae

Binomial name
- Eusynthemis deniseae Theischinger, 1977

Species of dragonfly

Eusynthemis deniseae is a species of dragonfly of the family Synthemistidae, known as the Carnarvon tigertail. It is a medium-sized dragonfly with black and pale yellow markings. It inhabits streams in the vicinity of Carnarvon National Park, Queensland, Australia.

== Etymology ==
The genus name Eusynthemis combines the Greek εὖ (eu, "well") with Synthemis, an existing genus of dragonflies, referring to a more developed form compared with other members of Synthemis.

In 1977, Günther Theischinger named this species deniseae, an eponym honouring his daughter Denise.

== Gallery ==
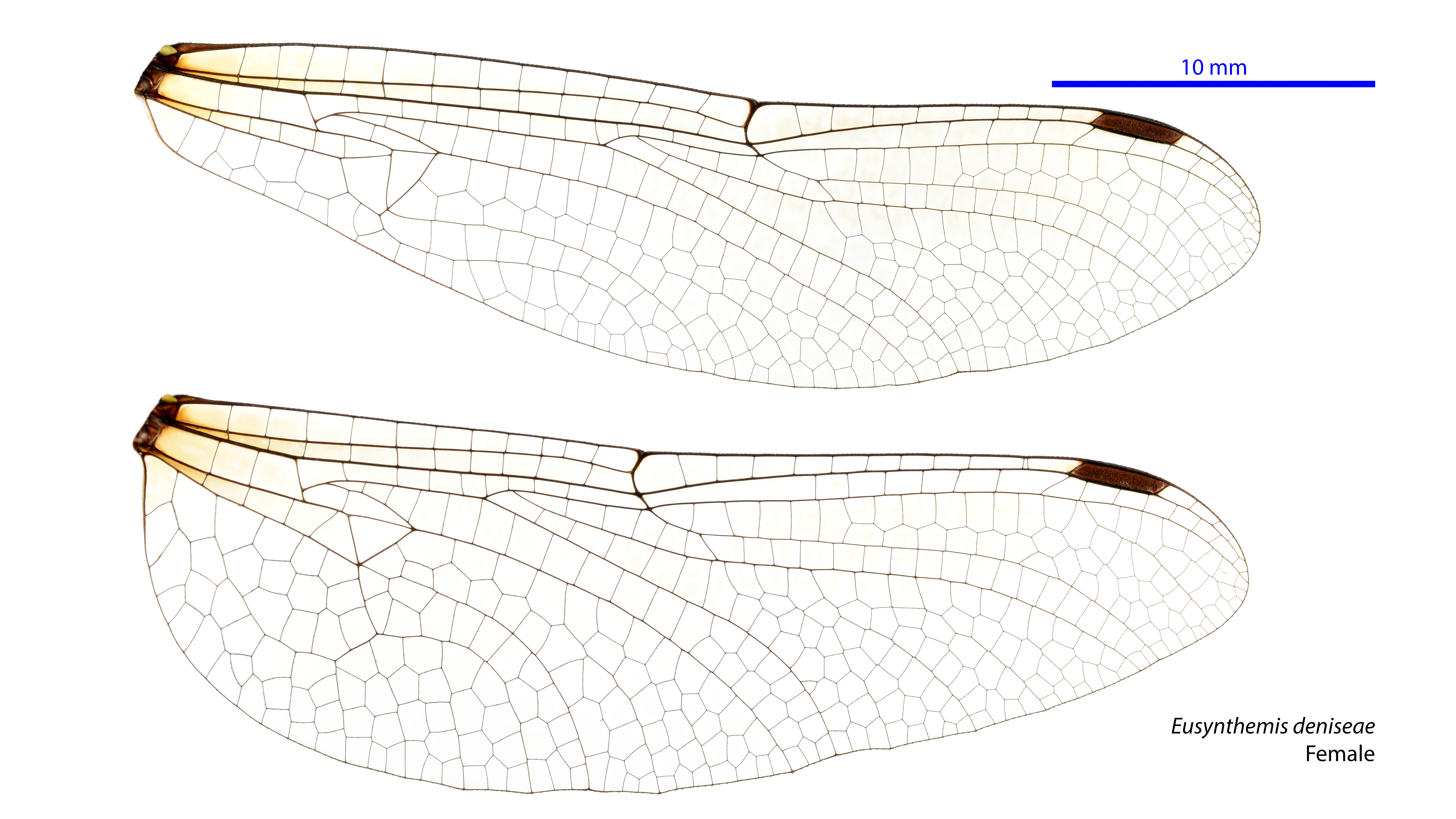
Female wings

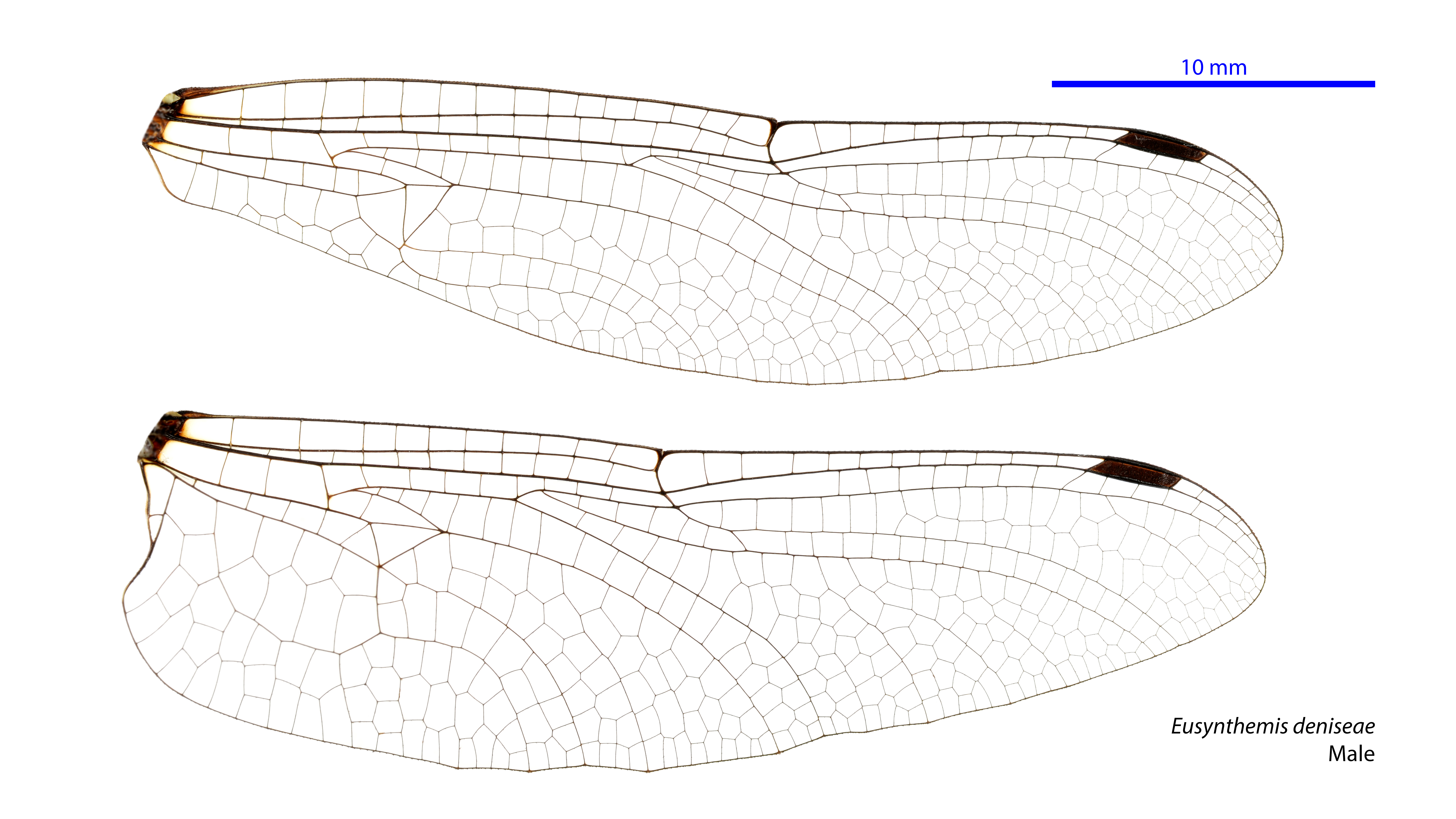
Male wings

== See also ==
- List of Odonata species of Australia
