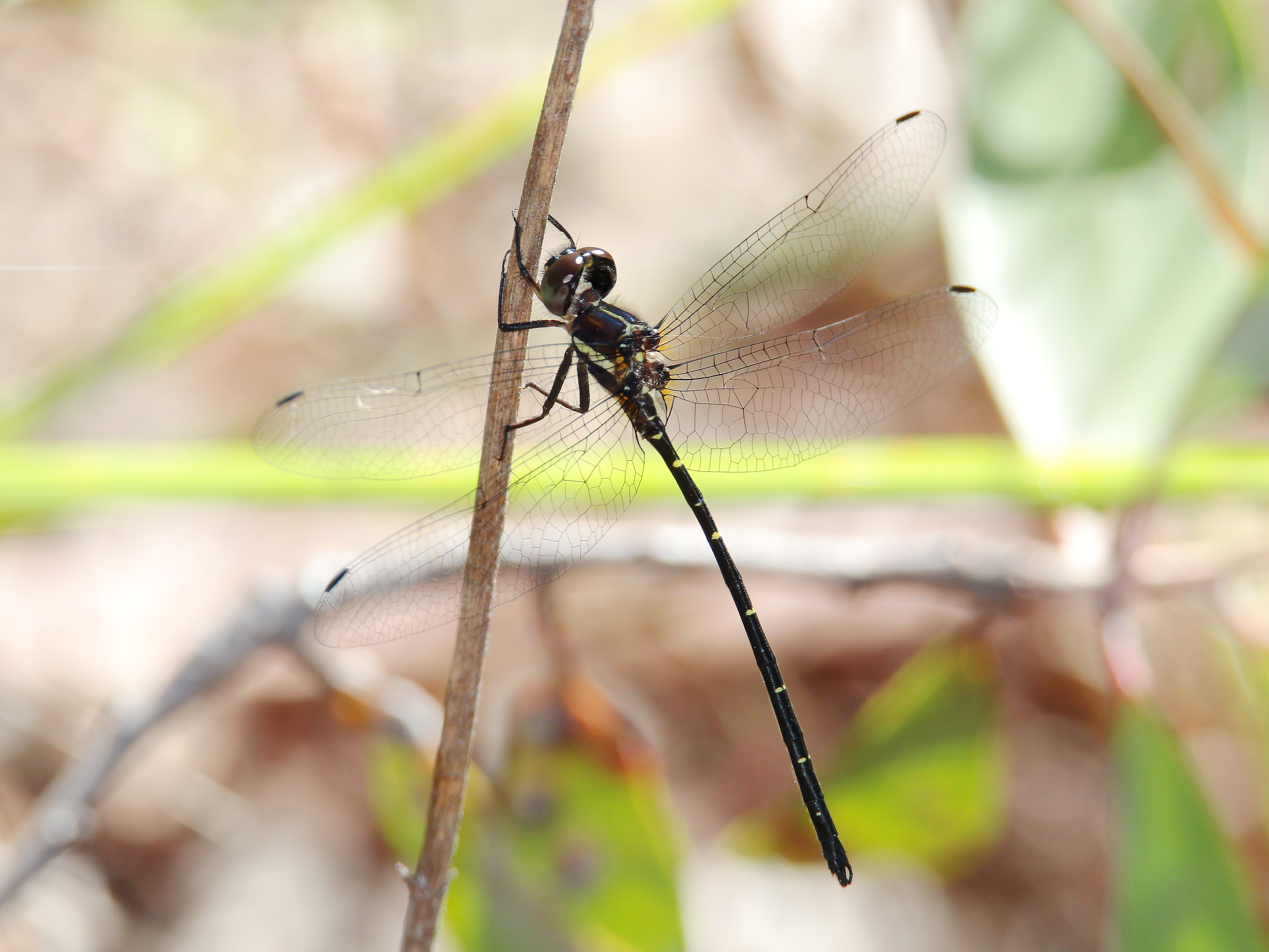
- Male black tigertail
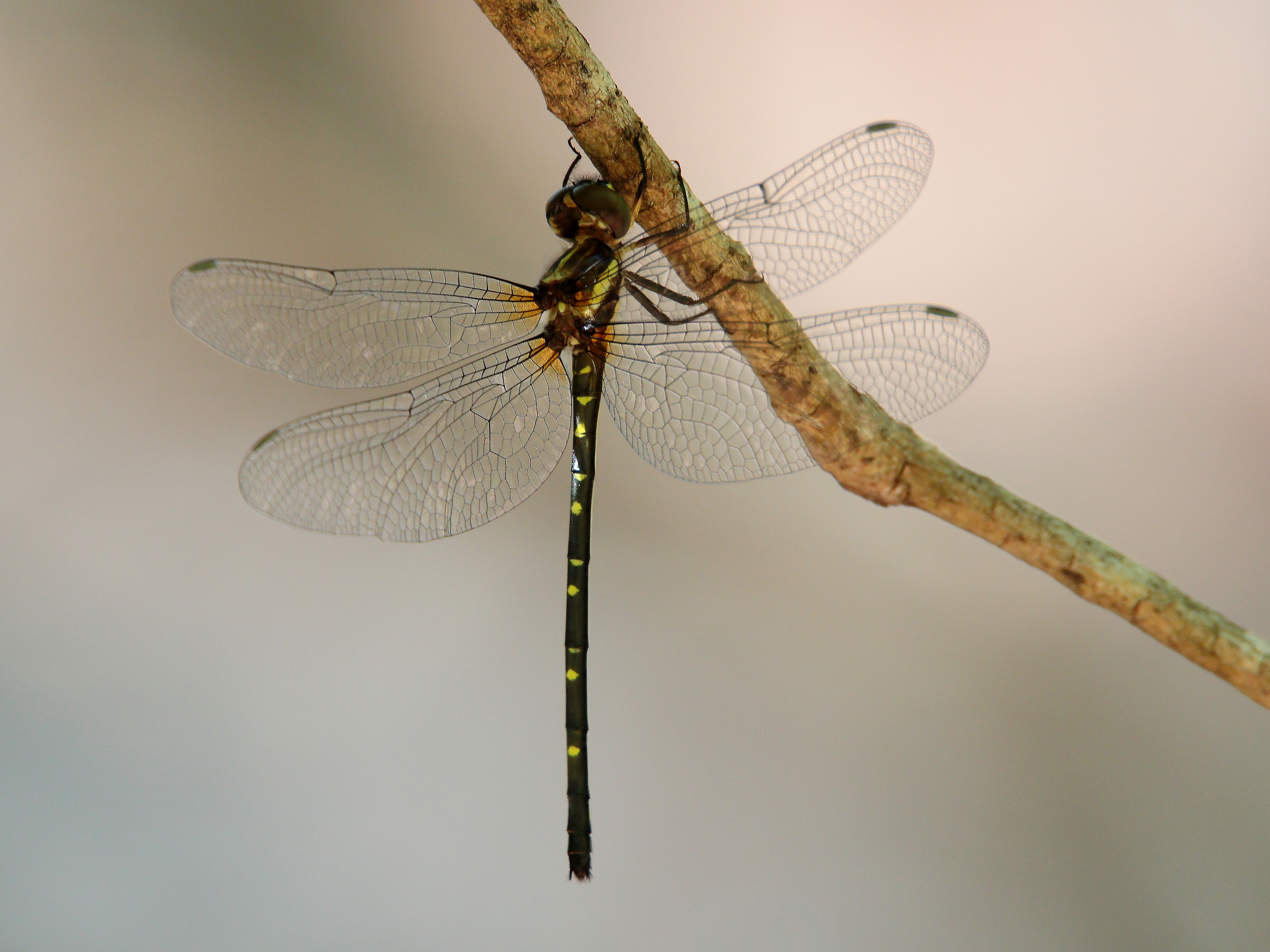
- Female black tigertail

Conservation status
- Least Concern (IUCN 3.1)

Scientific classification
- Kingdom: Animalia
- Phylum: Arthropoda
- Clade: Pancrustacea
- Class: Insecta
- Order: Odonata
- Suborder: Anisoptera
- Superfamily: Libelluloidea
- Family: Synthemistidae
- Genus: Eusynthemis
- Species: E. nigra

Binomial name
- Eusynthemis nigra (Tillyard, 1906)

Synonyms
- Synthemis nigra Tillyard, 1906; Eusynthemis ptilorhina Förster, 1908; Metathemis nigra xanthosticta Tillyard, 1913

= Eusynthemis nigra =

Black tigertail

Species of dragonfly

Eusynthemis nigra is a species of dragonfly of the family Synthemistidae, known as the black tigertail. It is a medium-sized dragonfly with black and yellow markings. It inhabits streams in eastern Australia

Eusynthemis nigra appears similar to Eusynthemis brevistyla which is found in streams of south-eastern Australia.

== Etymology ==
The genus name Eusynthemis combines the Greek εὖ (eu, "well") with Synthemis, an existing genus of dragonflies, referring to a more developed form compared with other members of Synthemis.

The species name nigra is derived from the Latin niger ("black"), referring to the black abdomen.

== Gallery ==
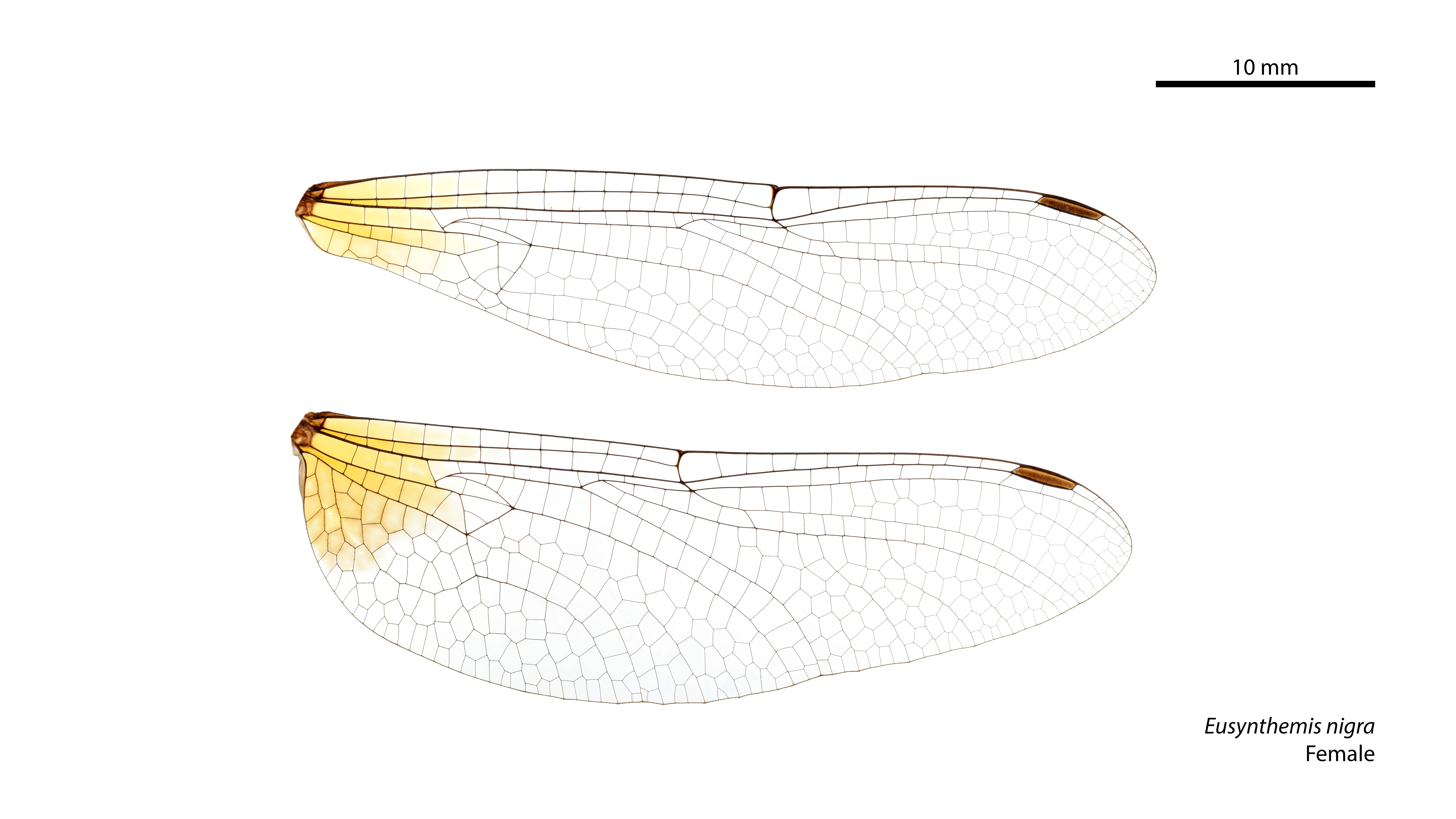
Female wings

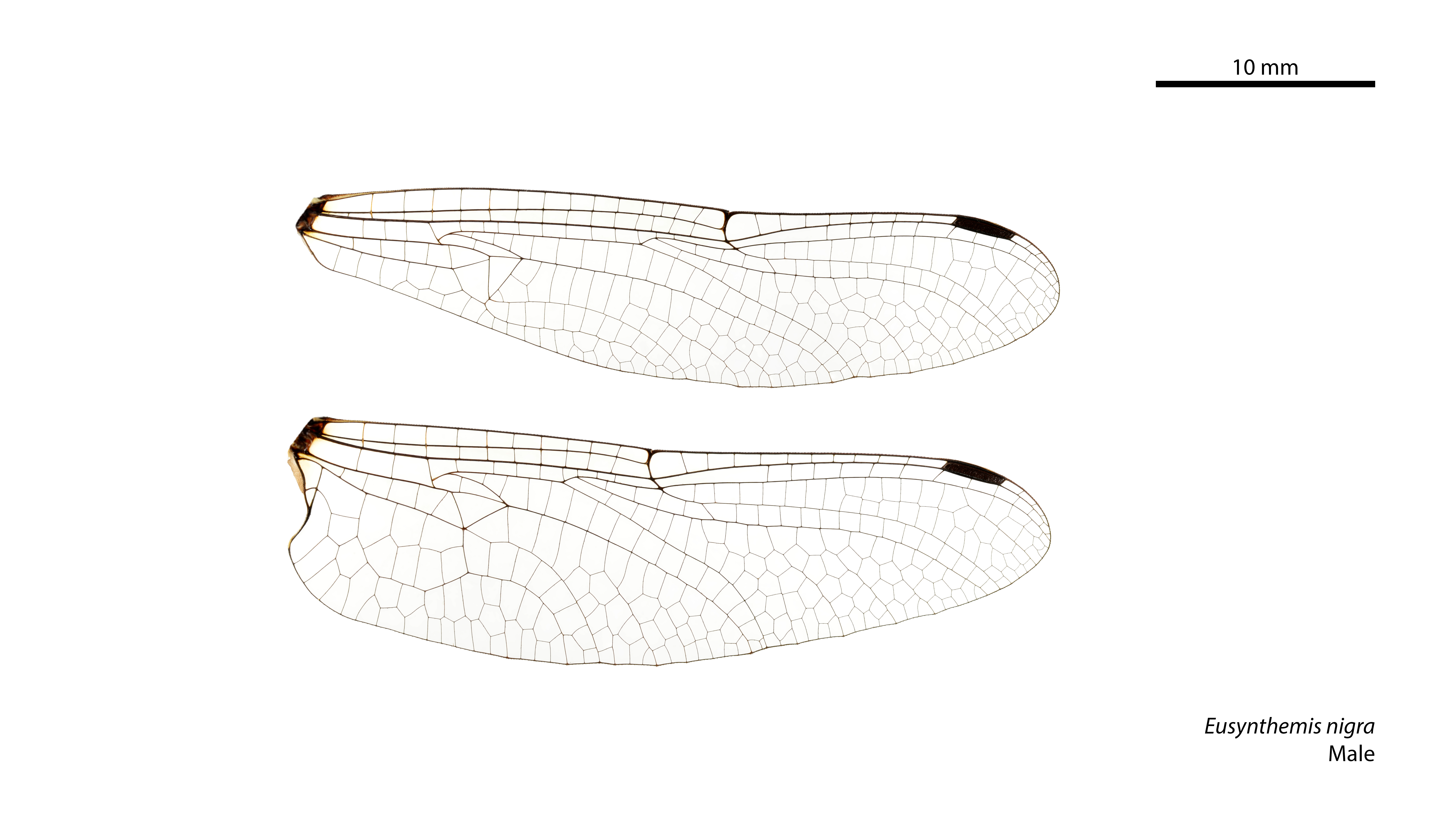
Male wings

== See also ==
- List of Odonata species of Australia
