= Eusynthemis virgula =

Golden tigertail

Conservation status
- Least Concern (IUCN 3.1)

Scientific classification
- Kingdom: Animalia
- Phylum: Arthropoda
- Clade: Pancrustacea
- Class: Insecta
- Order: Odonata
- Suborder: Anisoptera
- Superfamily: Libelluloidea
- Family: Synthemistidae
- Genus: Eusynthemis
- Species: E. virgula

Binomial name
- Eusynthemis virgula (Selys, 1874)

Synonyms
- Synthemis virgula Selys, 1874

Species of dragonfly

Eusynthemis virgula is a species of dragonfly of the family Synthemistidae, known as the golden tigertail. It is a medium-sized dragonfly with black and yellow markings. It inhabits streams in south-eastern Australia.

Eusynthemis virgula appears similar to Eusynthemis brevistyla which is also found in streams of south-eastern Australia.

== Etymology ==
The genus name Eusynthemis combines the Greek εὖ (eu, "well") with Synthemis, an existing genus of dragonflies, referring to a more developed form compared with other members of Synthemis.

The species name virgula is the diminutive form of the Latin virga ("line" or "stripe"), referring to the black markings in the wings.

== Gallery ==
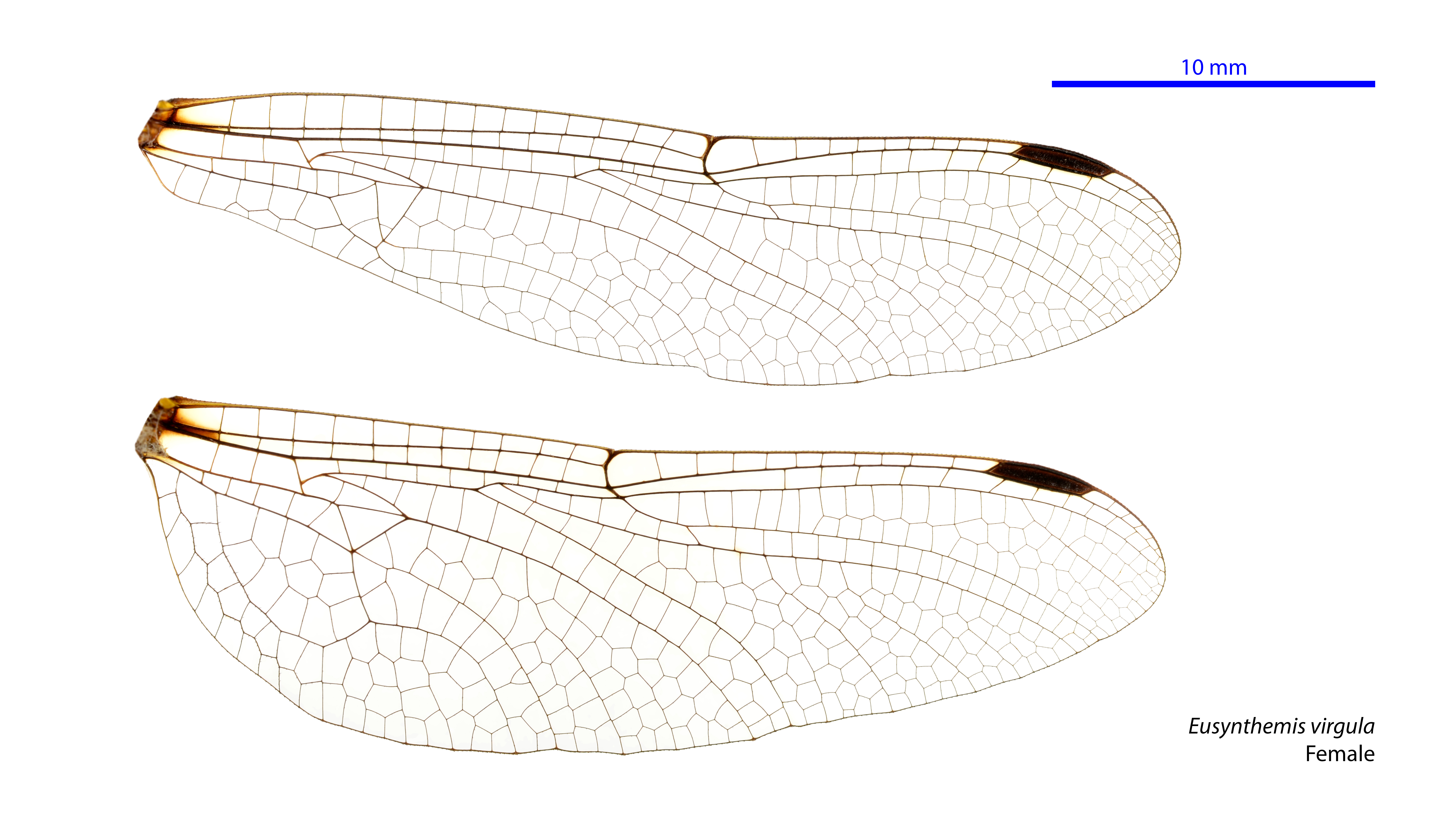
Female wings

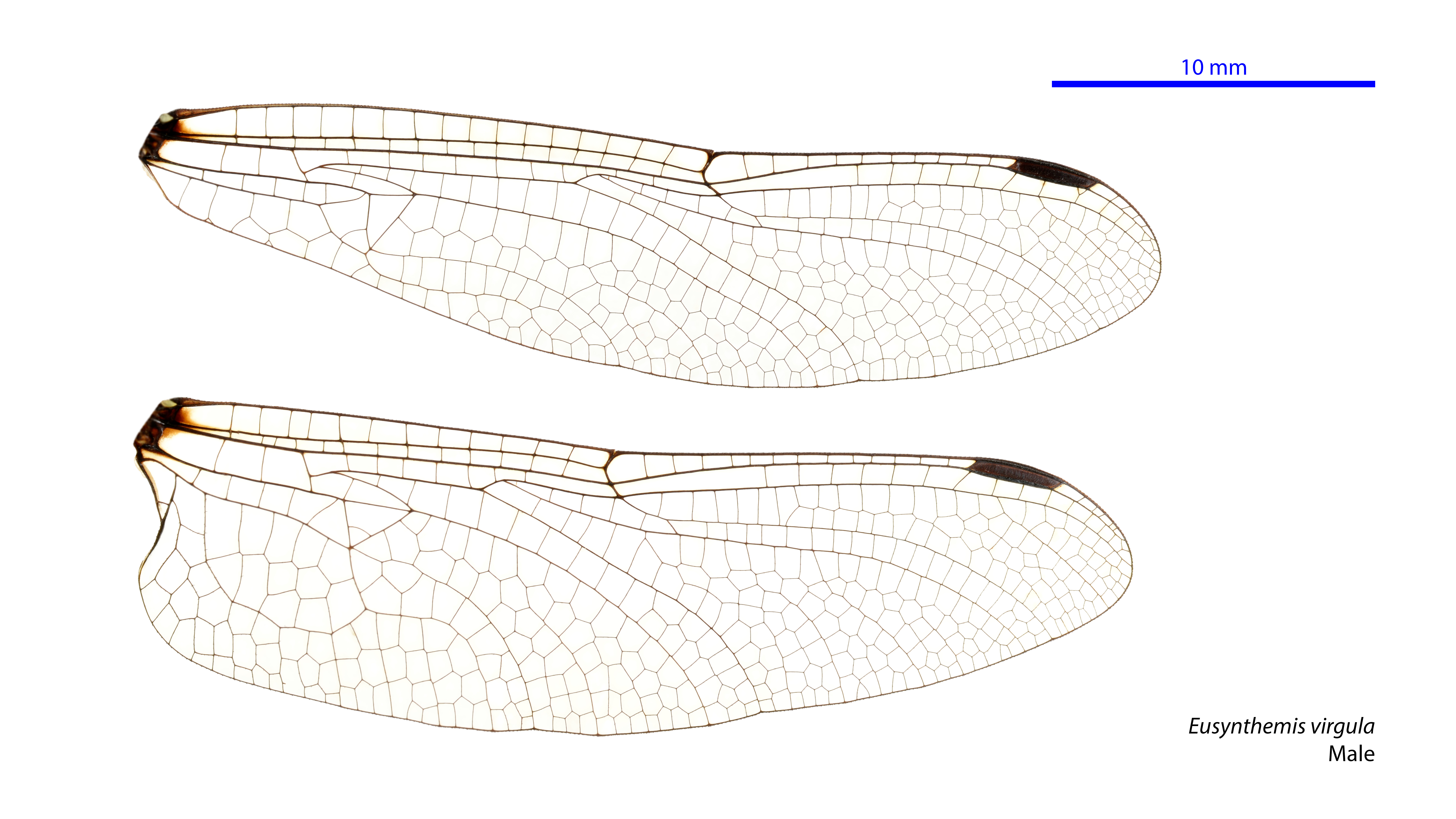
Male wings

== See also ==
- List of Odonata species of Australia
