= Palaeosynthemis =

Scientific classification
- Kingdom: Animalia
- Phylum: Arthropoda
- Clade: Pancrustacea
- Class: Insecta
- Order: Odonata
- Suborder: Anisoptera
- Superfamily: Libelluloidea
- Family: Synthemistidae
- Genus: Palaeosynthemis; Förster, 1903

Genus of dragonflies

Palaeosynthemis is a genus of dragonflies.

The genus includes these species:

- Palaeosynthemis alecto (Lieftinck, 1953)
- Palaeosynthemis cervula (Lieftinck, 1938)
- Palaeosynthemis cyrene (Lieftinck, 1953)
- Palaeosynthemis elegans Theischinger & Richards, 2013
- Palaeosynthemis evelynae (Lieftinck, 1953)
- Palaeosynthemis feronia (Lieftinck, 1938)
- Palaeosynthemis gracilenta (Lieftinck, 1935)
- Palaeosynthemis kimminsi (Lieftinck, 1953)
- Palaeosynthemis nigrostigma Theischinger & Richards, 2013
- Palaeosynthemis opaca Theischinger & Richards, 2013
- Palaeosynthemis papilio Theischinger & Richards, 2013
- Palaeosynthemis primigenia (Förster, 1903)
- Palaeosynthemis wollastoni (Campion, 1915)
