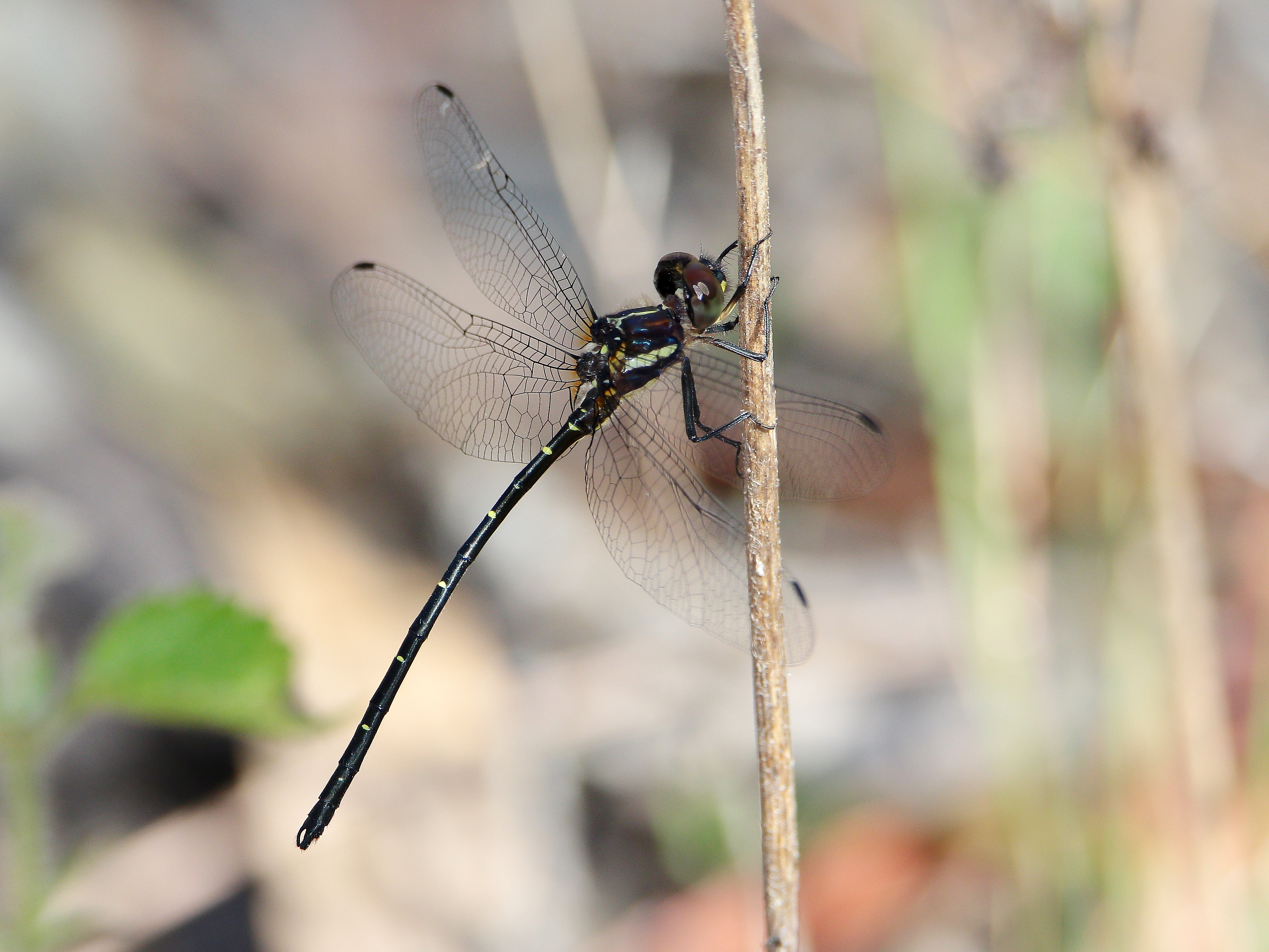
- Eusynthemis nigra

Scientific classification
- Kingdom: Animalia
- Phylum: Arthropoda
- Clade: Pancrustacea
- Class: Insecta
- Order: Odonata
- Suborder: Anisoptera
- Superfamily: Libelluloidea
- Family: Synthemistidae
- Genus: Eusynthemis; Förster, 1903

Synonyms
- Metathemis Tillyard, 1910

= Eusynthemis =

Genus of dragonflies

Eusynthemis is a genus of dragonflies in the family Synthemistidae. They are commonly known as tigertails. Species of this genus are found mostly in Australia with one species, Eusynthemis frontalis, found in the Solomon Islands.

== Species ==
The genus Eusynthemis includes these species:

- Eusynthemis aurolineata (Tillyard, 1913) - variable tigertail
- Eusynthemis barbarae (Moulds, 1985) - Mount Lewis tigertail
- Eusynthemis brevistyla (Selys, 1871) - small tigertail
- Eusynthemis cooloola Theischinger, 2018 - Cooloola tigertail
- Eusynthemis deniseae Theischinger, 1977 - Carnarvon tigertail
- Eusynthemis frontalis Lieftinck, 1949
- Eusynthemis guttata (Selys, 1871) - southern tigertail
- Eusynthemis netta Theischinger, 1999 - pretty tigertail
- Eusynthemis nigra (Tillyard, 1906) - black tigertail
- Eusynthemis rentziana Theischinger, 1998 - swift tigertail
- Eusynthemis tenera Theischinger, 1995 - rainforest tigertail
- Eusynthemis tillyardi Theischinger, 1995 - mountain tigertail
- Eusynthemis ursa Theischinger, 1999 - Barrington tigertail
- Eusynthemis ursula Theischinger, 1998 - beech tigertail
- Eusynthemis virgula (Selys, 1874) - golden tigertail

== Taxonomic history ==
In 1903, Förster established Eusynthemis as a subgenus of Synthemis, designating Synthemis brevistyla Selys as the type species.

In 1910, Tillyard proposed a new genus, Metathemis, to include four species previously placed in Synthemis: S. brevistyla, S. virgula, S. guttata and S. nigra.

In 1949, Lieftinck synonymised Metathemis with Eusynthemis, recognising that both names referred to the same taxonomic group.

The name Eusynthemis has since been retained as the valid genus.

As a result of this synonymy, species originally described under Metathemis, including names such as Metathemis guttata and its subspecies (e.g. Metathemis guttata aurolineata), are now treated as belonging to Eusynthemis.

== Etymology ==
The genus name Eusynthemis combines the Greek εὖ (eu, "well") with Synthemis, an existing genus of dragonflies, referring to a more developed form compared with other members of Synthemis.
