= Eusynthemis ursa =

Barrington tigertail

Conservation status
- Data Deficient (IUCN 3.1)

Scientific classification
- Kingdom: Animalia
- Phylum: Arthropoda
- Clade: Pancrustacea
- Class: Insecta
- Order: Odonata
- Suborder: Anisoptera
- Superfamily: Libelluloidea
- Family: Synthemistidae
- Genus: Eusynthemis
- Species: E. ursa

Binomial name
- Eusynthemis ursa Theischinger, 1999

Species of dragonfly

Eusynthemis ursa is a species of dragonfly of the family Synthemistidae, known as the Barrington tigertail. It is a bulky, medium-sized dragonfly with black and yellow markings. It has been found at altitude in the vicinity of Barrington Tops, New South Wales, Australia

== Etymology ==
The genus name Eusynthemis combines the Greek εὖ (eu, "well") with Synthemis, an existing genus of dragonflies, referring to a more developed form compared with other members of Synthemis.

The species name ursa is Latin for "she-bear", referring to its larger size compared with Eusynthemis ursula, Latin for "little she-bear".

== Gallery ==
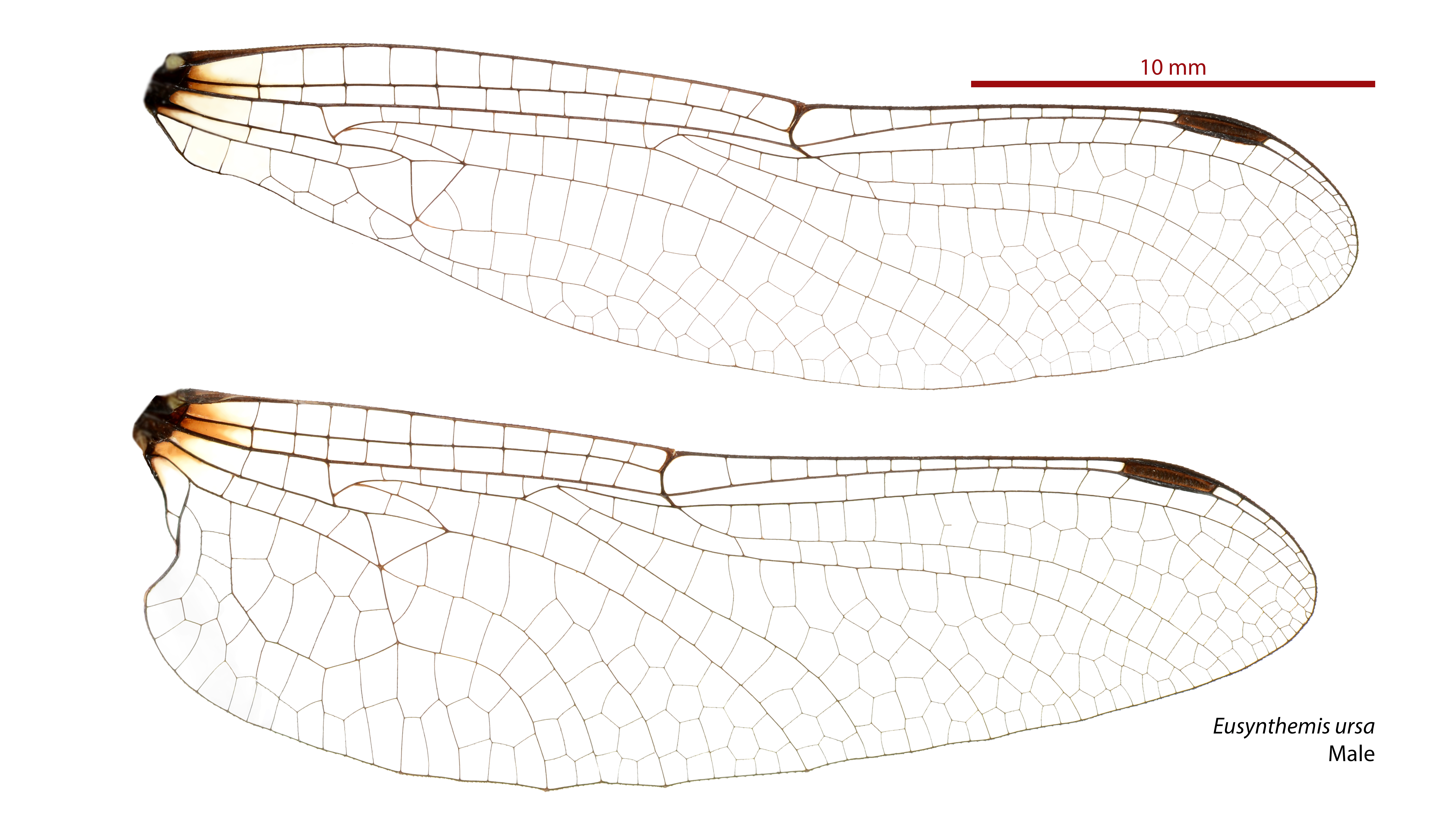
Male wings

== See also ==
- List of Odonata species of Australia
