= Eusynthemis brevistyla =

Small tigertail

Conservation status
- Least Concern (IUCN 3.1)

Scientific classification
- Kingdom: Animalia
- Phylum: Arthropoda
- Clade: Pancrustacea
- Class: Insecta
- Order: Odonata
- Suborder: Anisoptera
- Superfamily: Libelluloidea
- Family: Synthemistidae
- Genus: Eusynthemis
- Species: E. brevistyla

Binomial name
- Eusynthemis brevistyla (Selys, 1871)

Synonyms
- Synthemis brevistyla Selys, 1871

Species of dragonfly

Eusynthemis brevistyla is a species of dragonfly of the family Synthemistidae, known as a small tigertail. It is a medium-sized dragonfly with black and yellow markings. It inhabits streams in south-eastern Australia

== Etymology ==
The genus name Eusynthemis combines the Greek εὖ (eu, "well") with Synthemis, an existing genus of dragonflies, referring to a more developed form compared with other members of Synthemis.

The species name brevistyla is derived from the Latin brevis ("short") and stilus ("stylus" or "pointed instrument"), referring to the short appendages on the abdomen.

== Gallery ==
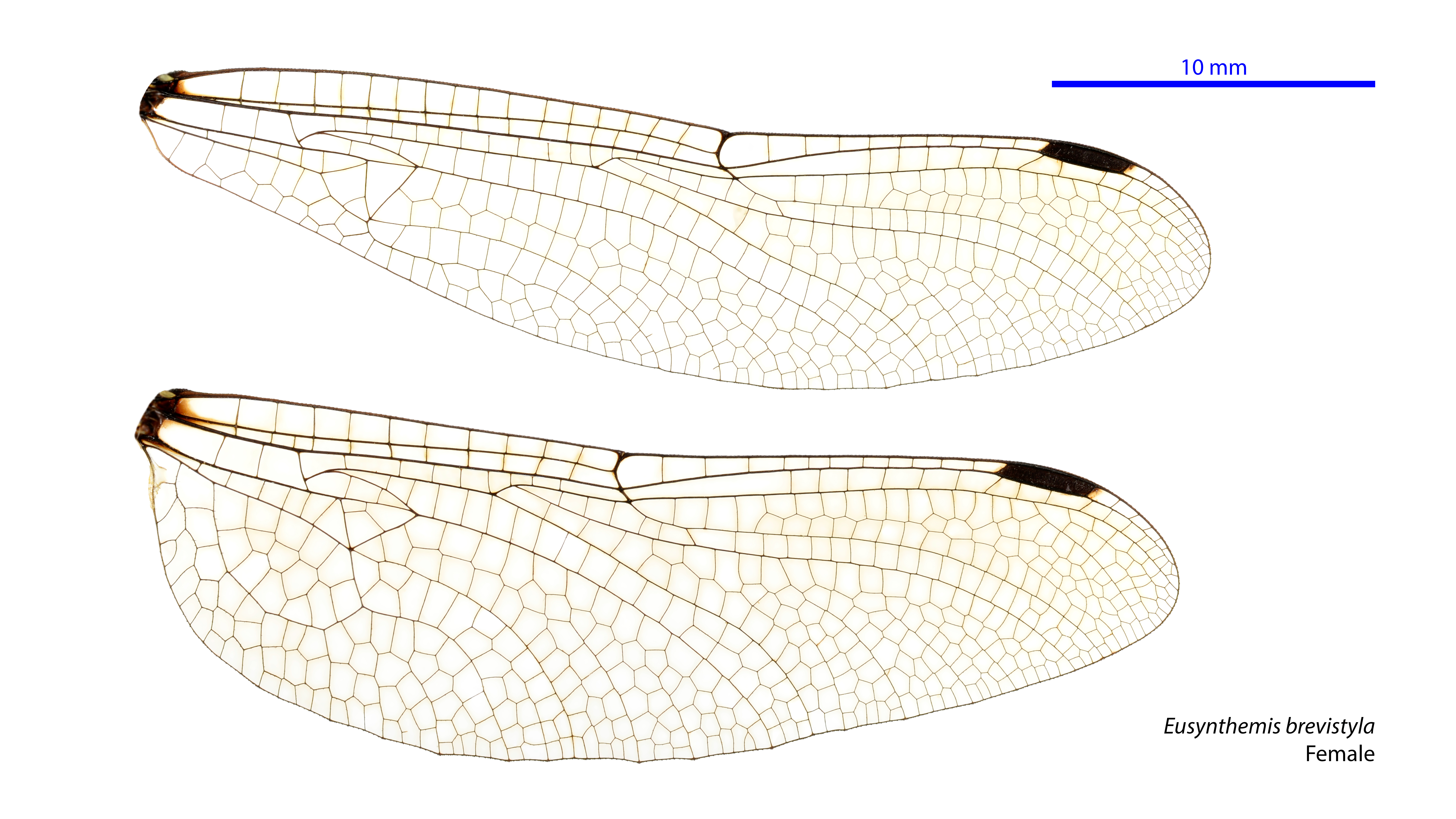
Female wings

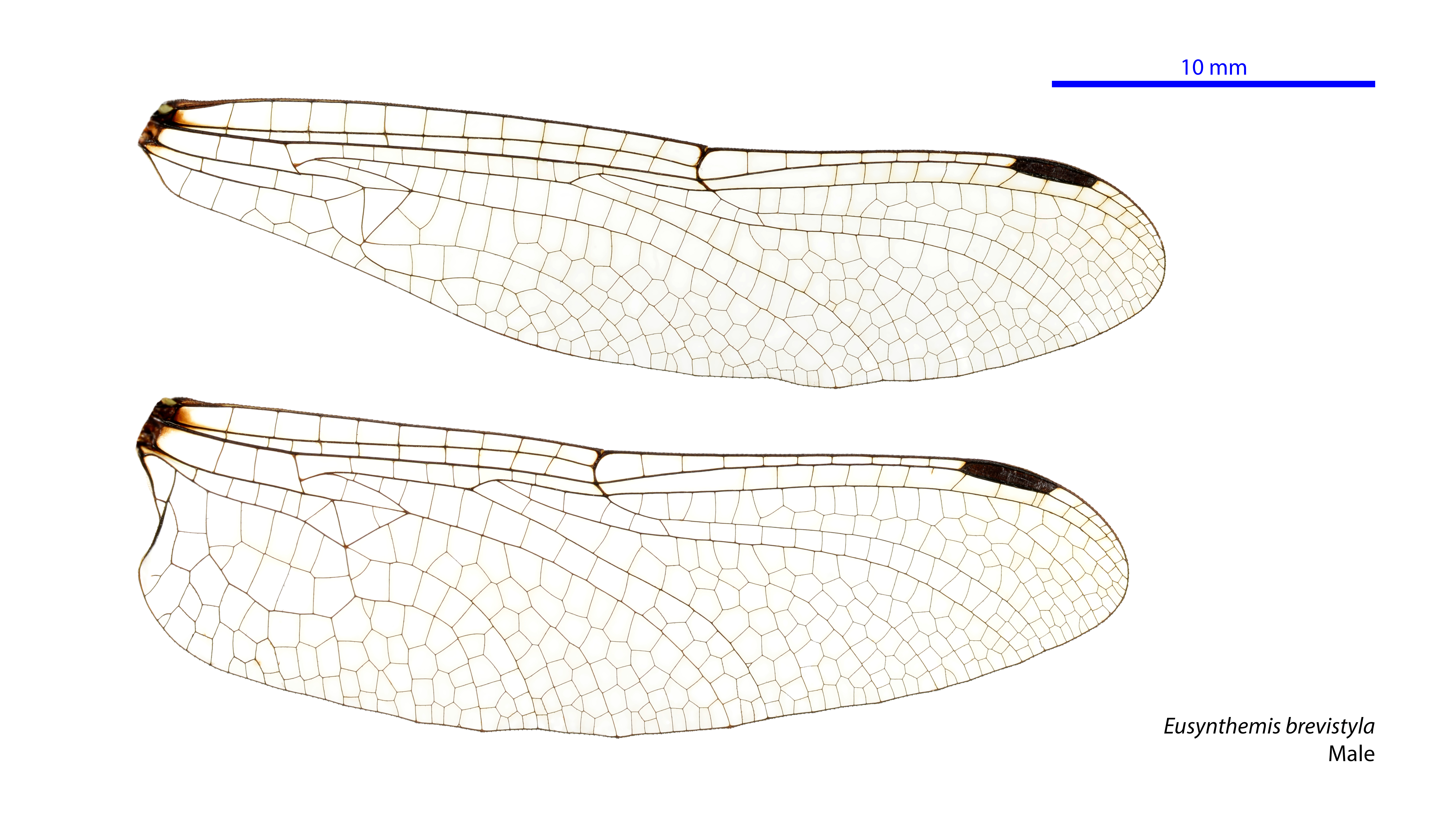
Male wings

== See also ==
- List of Odonata species of Australia
