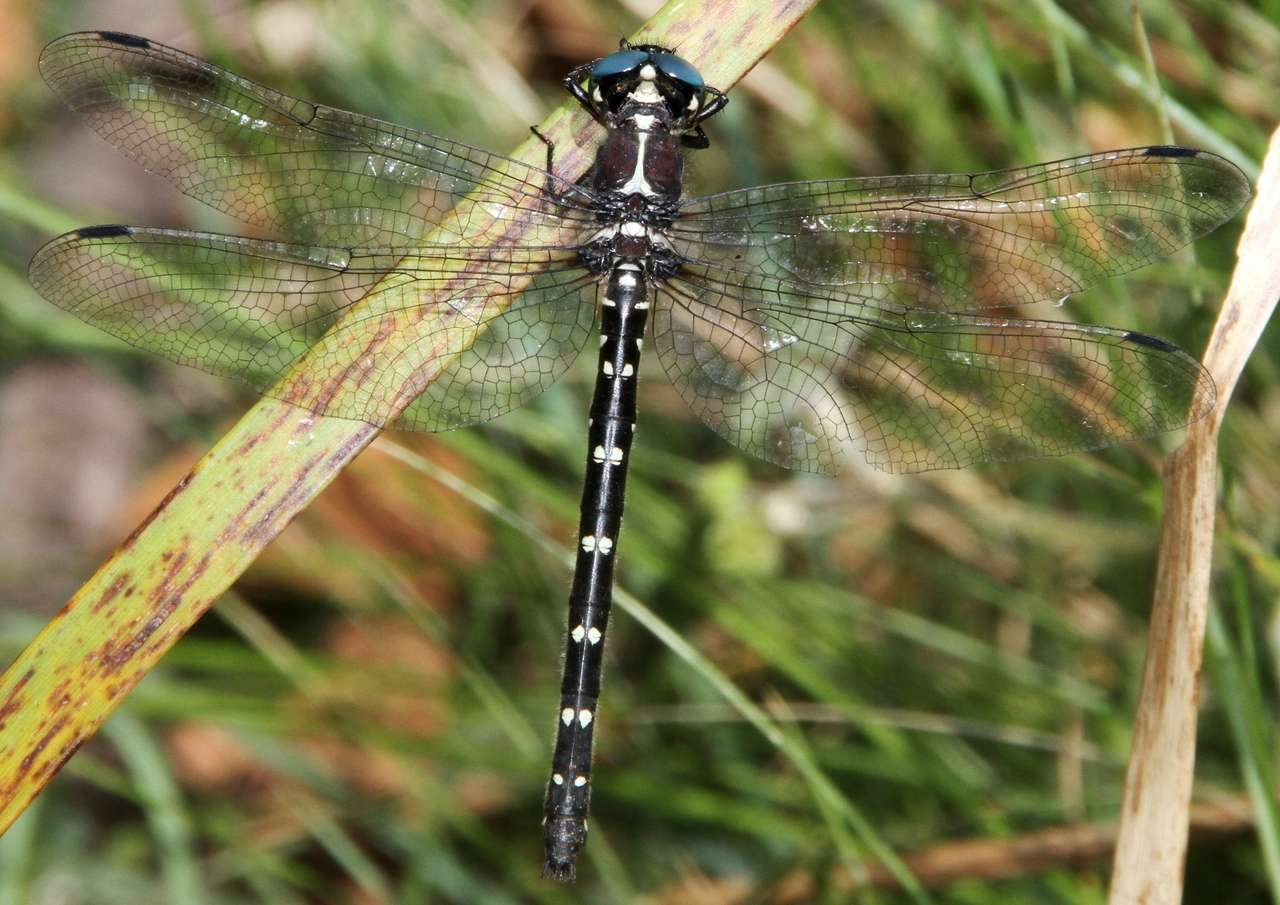
- Female
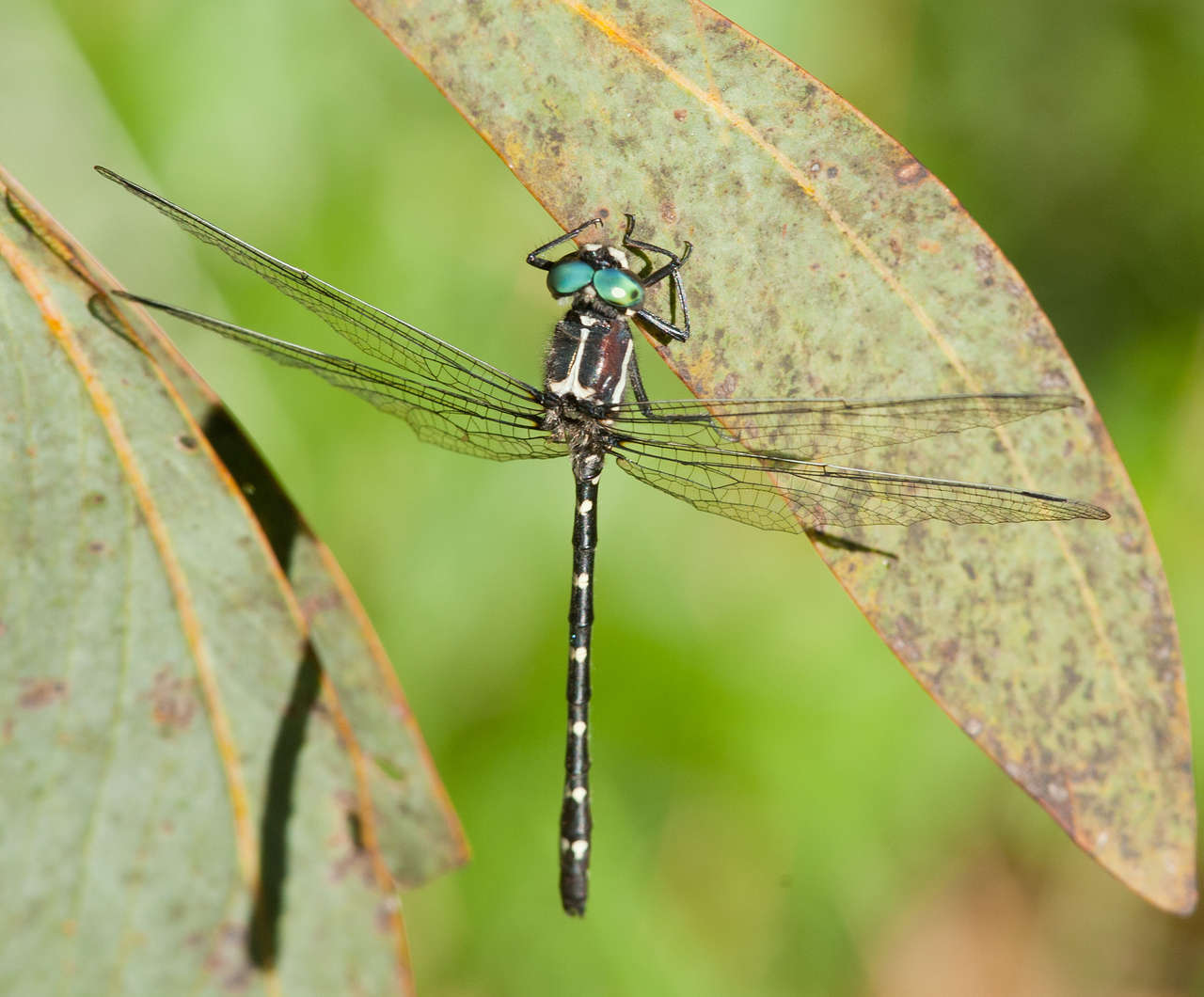
- Male

Conservation status
- Least Concern (IUCN 3.1)

Scientific classification
- Kingdom: Animalia
- Phylum: Arthropoda
- Clade: Pancrustacea
- Class: Insecta
- Order: Odonata
- Suborder: Anisoptera
- Superfamily: Libelluloidea
- Family: Synthemistidae
- Genus: Eusynthemis
- Species: E. guttata

Binomial name
- Eusynthemis guttata (Selys, 1871)

Synonyms
- Synthemis guttata Selys, 1871

= Eusynthemis guttata =

Southern tigertail

Species of dragonfly

Eusynthemis guttata is a species of dragonfly of the family Synthemistidae, known as the southern tigertail. It is a medium-sized dragonfly with black and yellow markings. It inhabits alpine streams in south-eastern Australia

== Etymology ==
The genus name Eusynthemis combines the Greek εὖ (eu, "well") with Synthemis, an existing genus of dragonflies, referring to a more developed form compared with other members of Synthemis.

The species name guttata is derived from the Latin gutta ("spot" or "mark"), referring to the yellow spots on the abdomen.

== Gallery ==
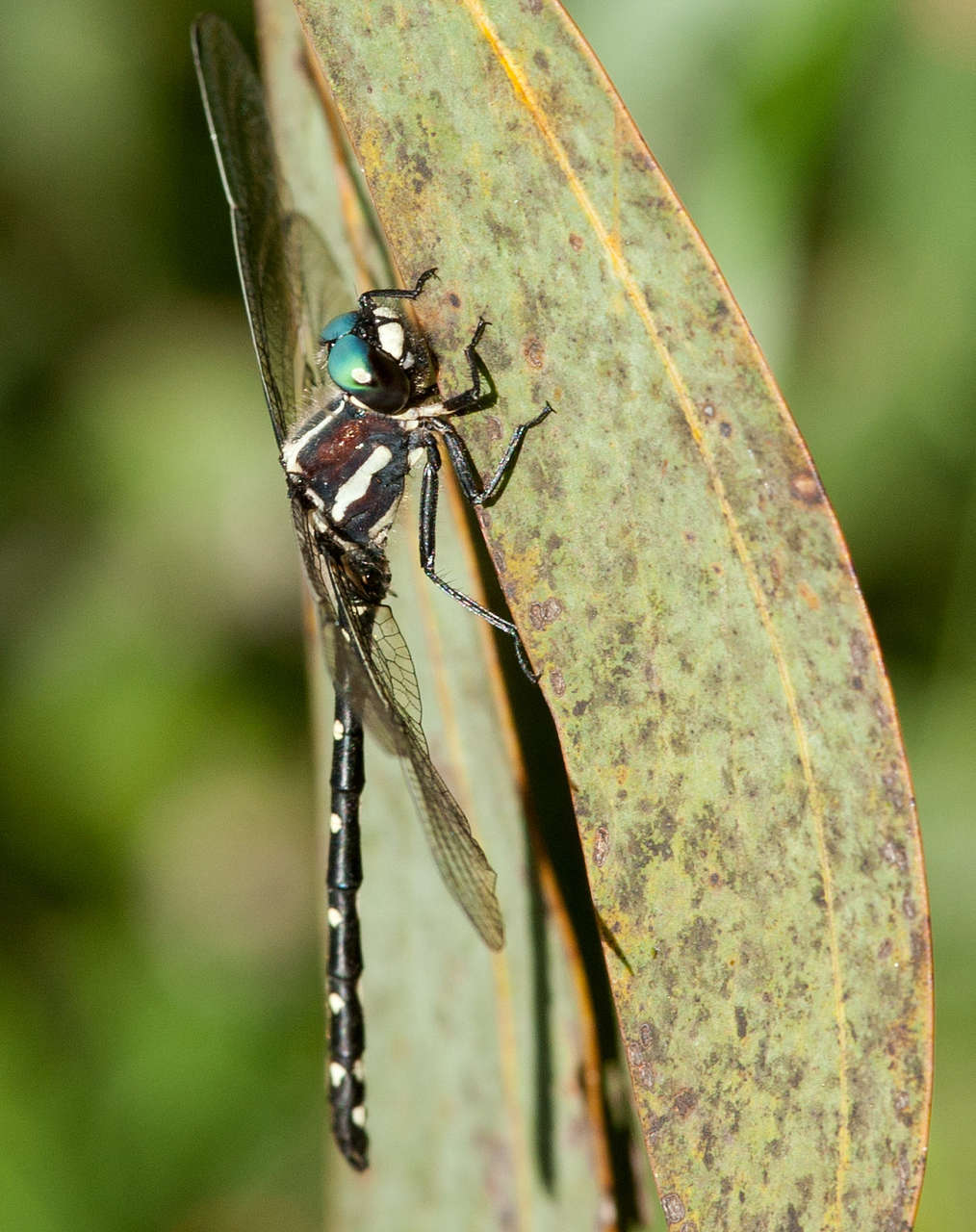
Male in profile

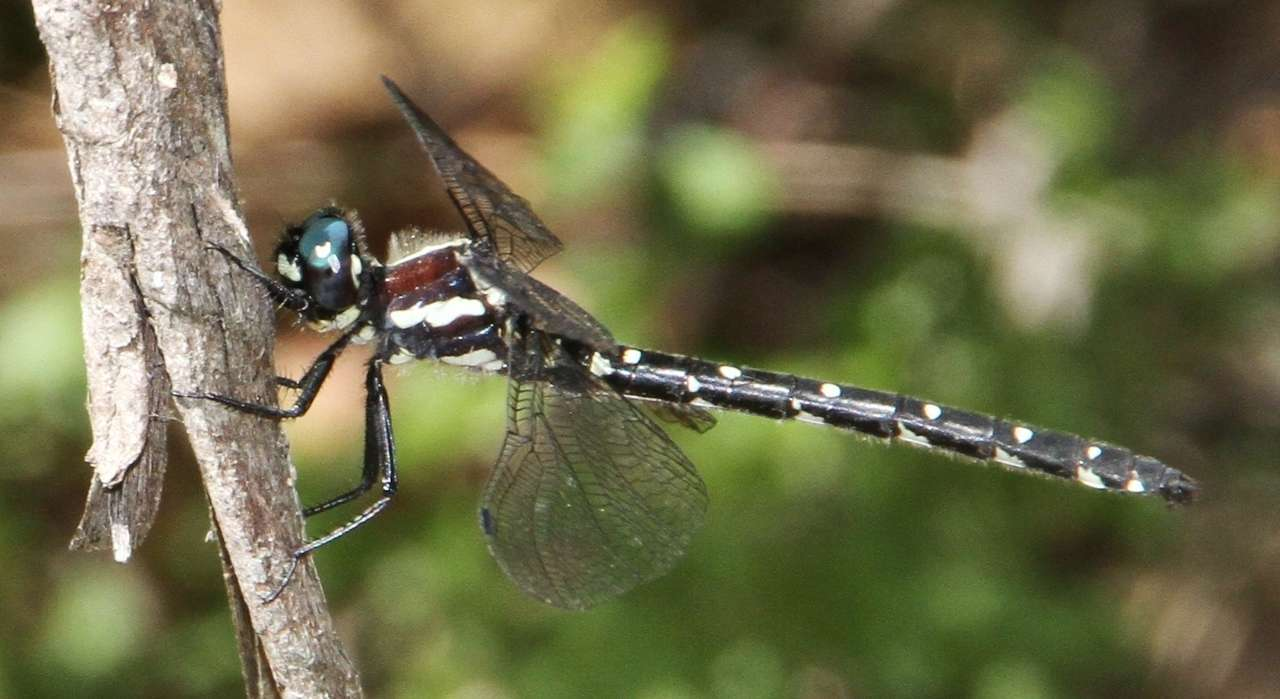
Female in profile

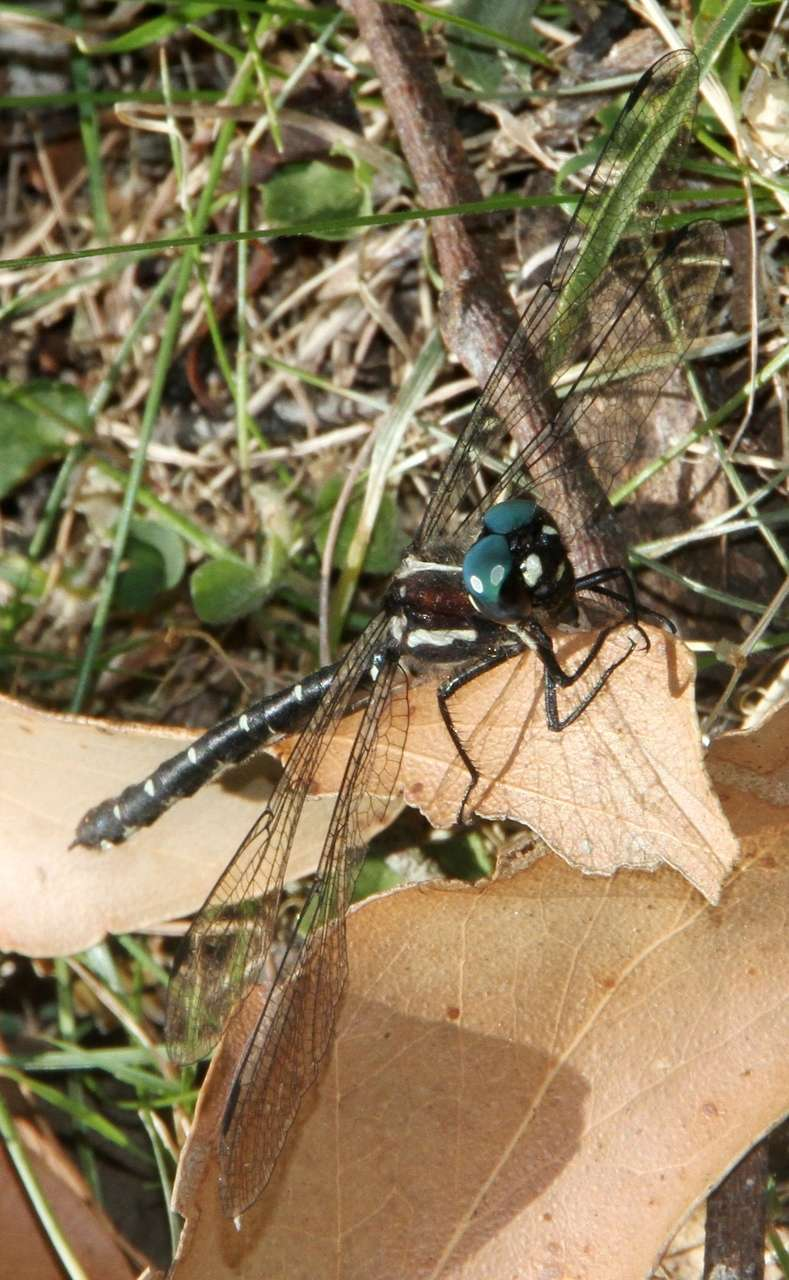
Female face

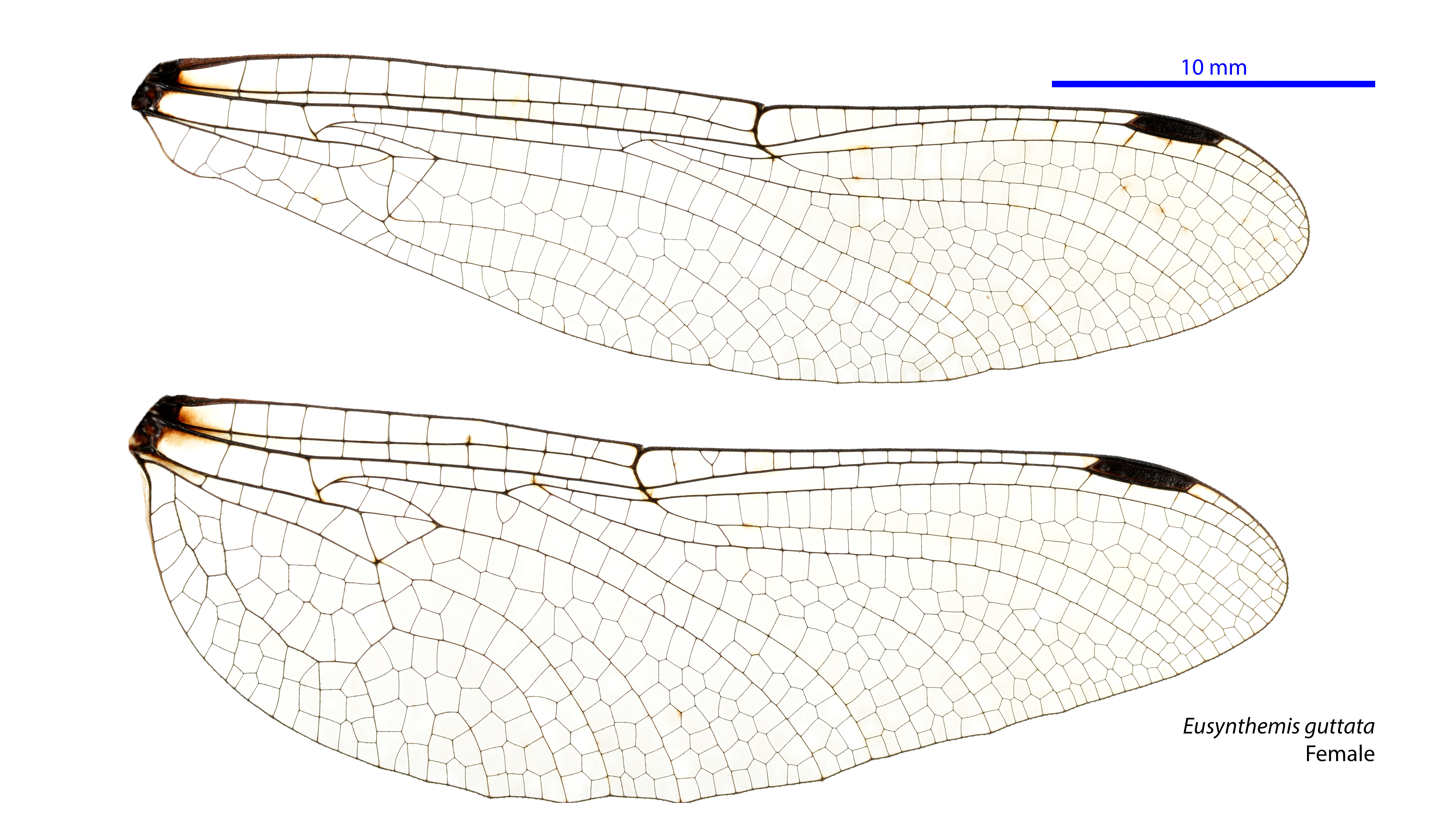
Female wings

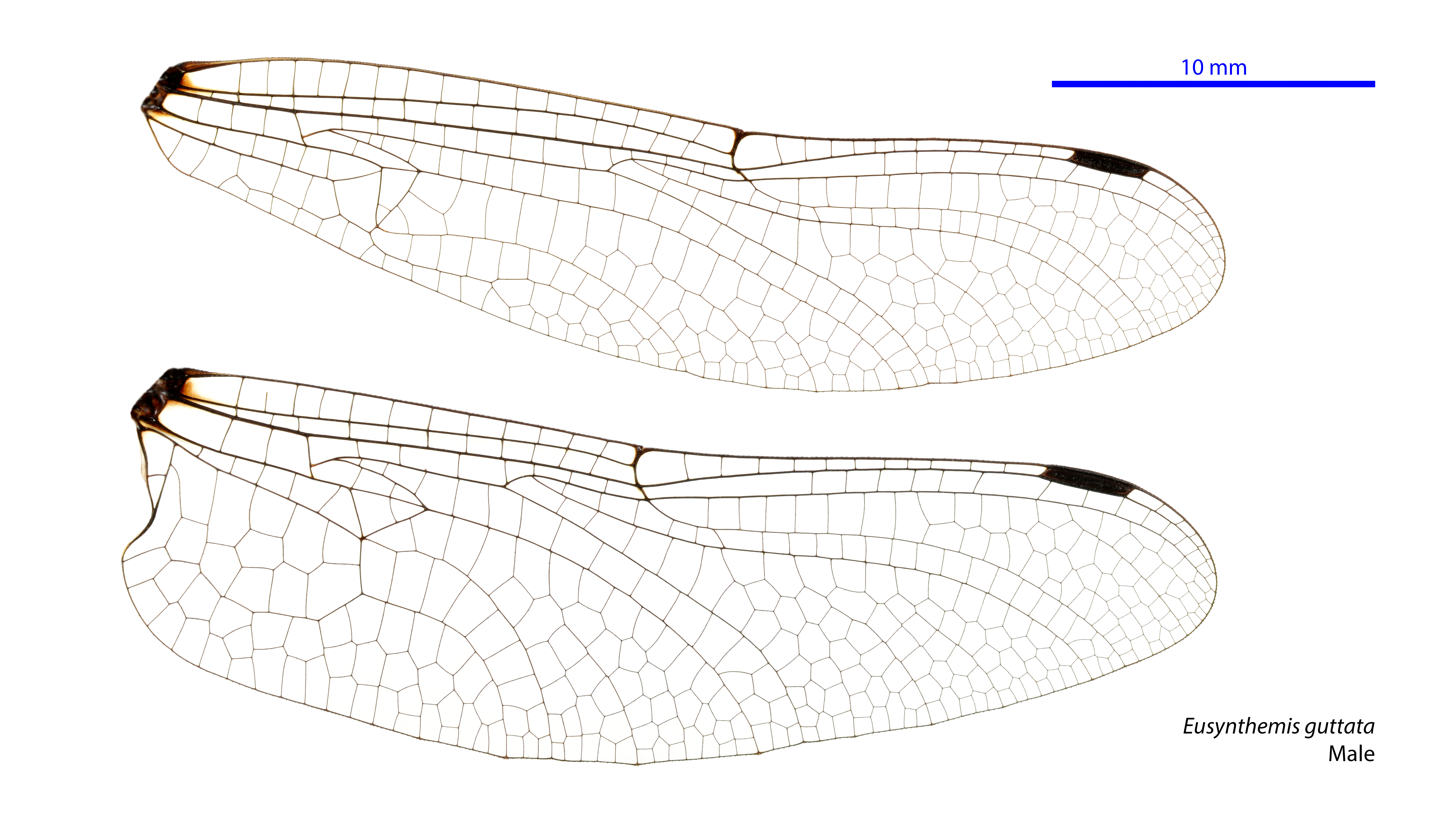
Male wings

== See also ==
- List of Odonata species of Australia
