= Günther Theischinger =

Austrian entomologist (born 1940)

- Born: February 21, 1940 (age 86); Linz, Austria
- Known for: Research on dragonflies and aquatic insects
- Scientific career
- Fields: Entomology
- Institutions: Oberösterreisches Landmuseum, CSIRO Division of Entomology, Australian Museum

Günther Theischinger (born 21 February 1940) is an Austrian entomologist who has specialized in dragonflies (Odonata) and other aquatic insects.

== Biography ==
Theischinger, originally from Austria, worked as curator of invertebrates at the Oberösterreichisches Landmuseum in Linz before moving to Australia. After working for two decades in private industry, he joined CSIRO to oversee aquatic insect collections and later assisted the NSW Environmental Protection Authority with invertebrate identification. Beginning in the 1960s, he collaborated with Tony Watson on the taxonomy and ecology of Australian dragonflies, particularly their value as environmental indicators. Theischinger has held research positions with the Australian Museum and the Smithsonian Institution and he has published extensively on dragonflies, stoneflies, alderflies and crane flies.

== Awards ==
- 1989 – Le Souef Memorial Award, Entomological Society of Victoria.
