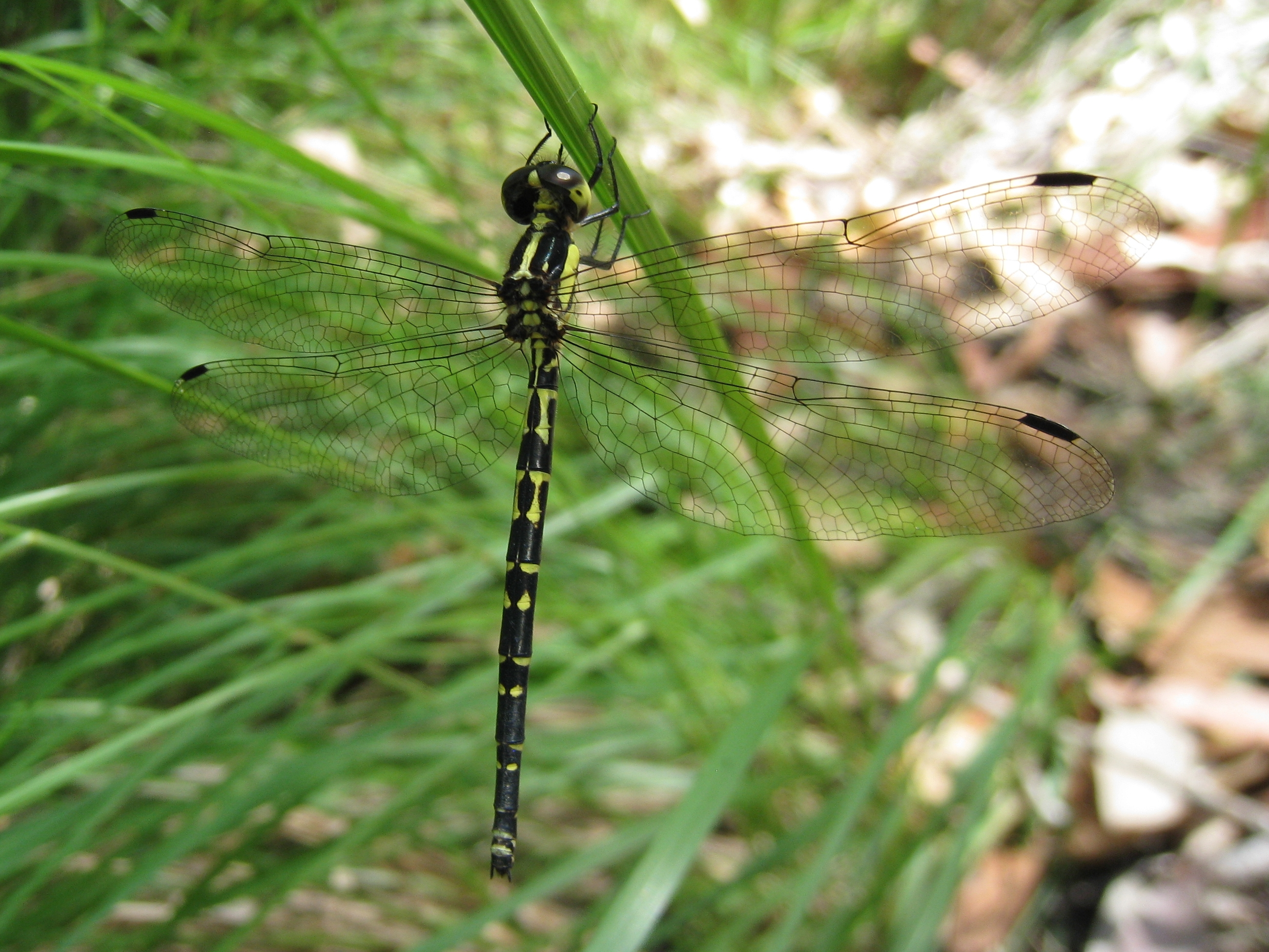
- Choristhemis flavoterminata

Scientific classification
- Kingdom: Animalia
- Phylum: Arthropoda
- Clade: Pancrustacea
- Class: Insecta
- Order: Odonata
- Infraorder: Anisoptera
- Superfamily: Libelluloidea
- Family: Synthemistidae; Tillyard, 1911
- Distribution of Synthemistidae

= Synthemistidae =

Synthemistidae Temporal range: Paleocene–Recent

Family of dragonflies

Synthemistidae is a family of dragonflies commonly known as tigertails, or sometimes, southern emeralds. This family is part of the superfamily Libelluloidea.

Synthemistidae is an ancient dragonfly family, dating back to the Palaeocene. Species of Synthemistidae occur in Australia and New Guinea. Most species are small in size and have narrow abdomens. Nymphs are bottom dwellers, and resist droughts by burying themselves very deeply. Synthemistid dragonflies frequently prefer marshy areas, as well as fast-flowing streams. The family Synthemistidae is sometimes called Synthemidae.

== Some taxonomic history ==
In 2025 a significant revision of Libelluloidea using morphological and molecular techniques added three families and restored six families. This reduced the number of genera included in Synthemistidae.

== Genera ==
The following genera are currently placed in Synthemistidae:

- Archaeosynthemis Carle, 1995
- Austrosynthemis Carle, 1995
- Calesynthemis Carle, 1995
- Choristhemis Tillyard, 1910
- Eusynthemis Förster, 1903
- Neocaledosynthemis Fleck, 2024
- Palaeosynthemis Forster, 1903
- Parasynthemis Carle, 1995
- Synthemiopsis Tillyard, 1917
- Synthemis Selys, 1870
- Tonyosynthemis Theischinger, 1998

== Fossils ==
The following fossil genus is currently assigned to Synthemistidae:

- †Gallosynthemis Nel, Ngo-Muller, Garrouste & Boderau, 2025

== Etymology ==
The family name Synthemistidae is derived from the type genus Synthemis, with the standard zoological suffix -idae used for animal families.

The genus name Synthemis is derived from the Greek σύν (syn, "together") and -themis, from Greek Θέμις (Themis), the goddess of divine law, order and justice. In early odonate taxonomy, names ending in -themis were introduced by Hagen and were widely used for dragonflies.

== See also ==
- List of dragonflies (Synthemistidae)
- List of Odonata species of Australia
