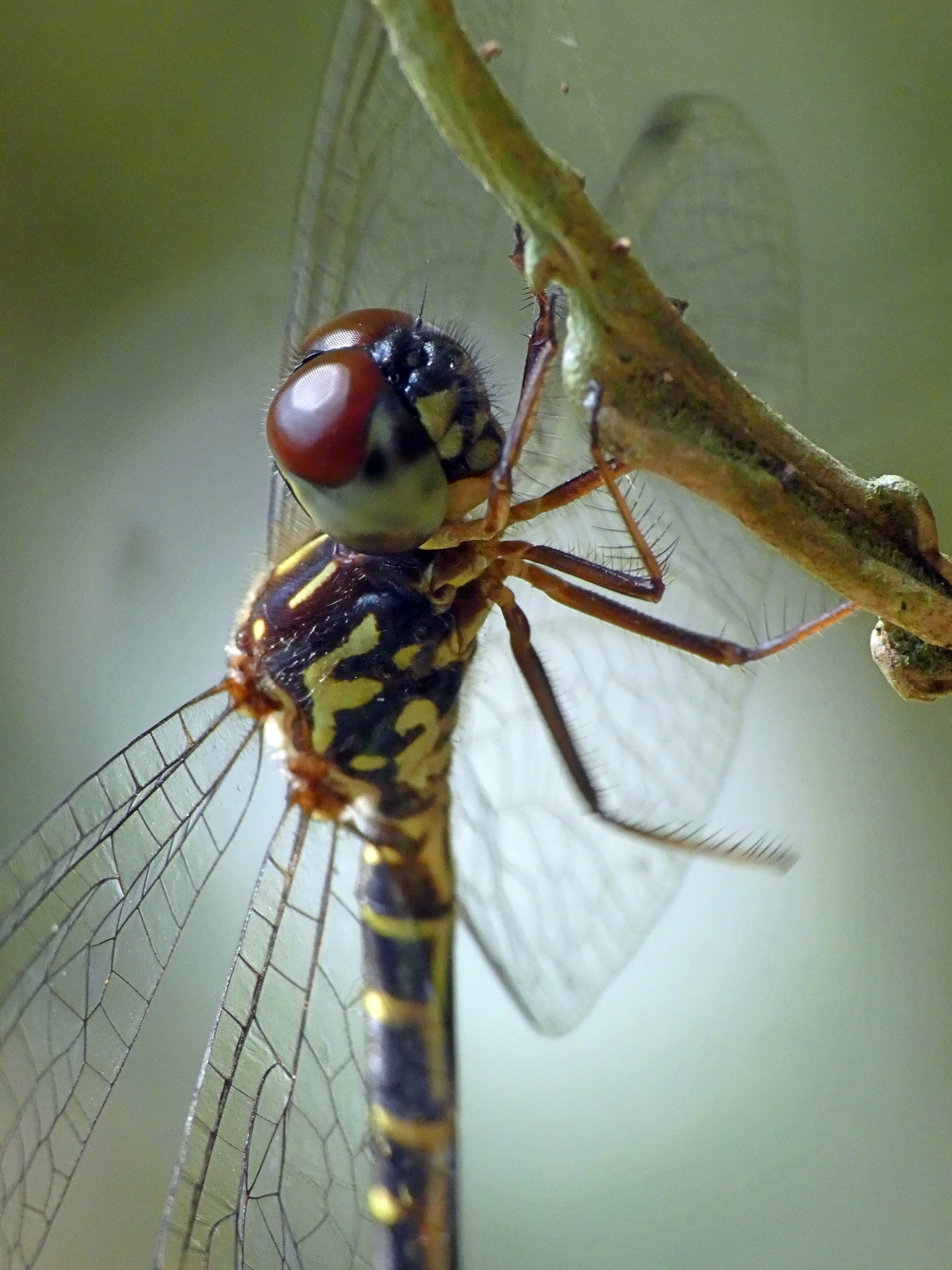

Conservation status
- Near Threatened (IUCN 3.1)

Scientific classification
- Kingdom: Animalia
- Phylum: Arthropoda
- Clade: Pancrustacea
- Class: Insecta
- Order: Odonata
- Suborder: Anisoptera
- Superfamily: Libelluloidea
- Family: Synthemistidae
- Genus: Choristhemis
- Species: C. olivei

Binomial name
- Choristhemis olivei (Tillyard, 1909)

Synonyms
- Synthemis olivei Tillyard, 1909

= Choristhemis olivei =

Delicate tigertail

Species of dragonfly

Choristhemis olivei, commonly known as a delicate tigertail, is a species of dragonfly in the family Synthemistidae. This species is endemic to north-eastern Queensland, Australia. Choristhemis olivei was first described by Robin Tillyard in 1909 after two males were found. In 1999, one additional male was collected and documented by Günther Theischinger, and more recently, a multitude of Choristhemis olivei were found on Thornton Peak, Cape Tribulation.

== Larvae ==
A sample of larvae taken from the Thornton Peak yielded an accurate description of the Choristhemis olivei. The specimen measured a length of 17.5 millimetres, the width of the head measuring 4.1 mm, and the abdomen length 12.1 mm. The specimen was a mix of gray and brown with a short frontal plate and long, wide setal structures. These characteristics are believed to be unique to this species, mainly because of a small body overall compared to most species of the Synthemistidae family.

== Conflict ==
Some scientists speculated that Choristhemis olivei and Choristhemis flavoterminata specimens found in Australia were that of the same species. More recently however, multiple scientists came to the conclusion that these two species are not the same because of the difference in the male's anal appendages.

== Etymology ==
The genus name Choristhemis is derived from the Greek χωρίς (chōris, "without") and the common dragonfly suffix -themis. The name refers to the absence of the small membranous flap at the base of the hindwing.

In 1909, Robin Tillyard named this species olivei, an eponym honouring his friend, the naturalist and collector Edmund Abraham Cumberbatch Olive (1844-1921) of Cooktown, Queensland.

== Gallery ==
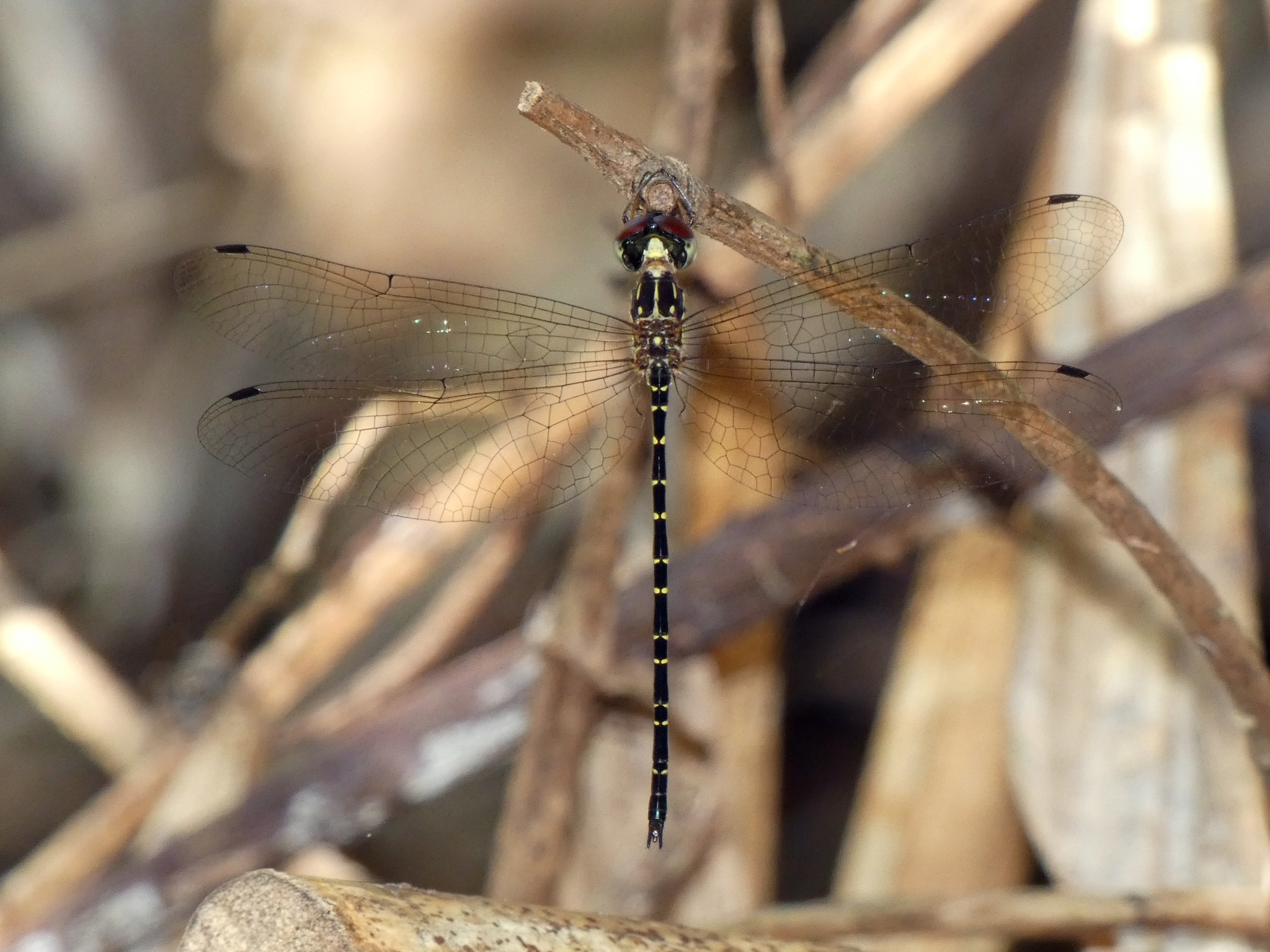
Male

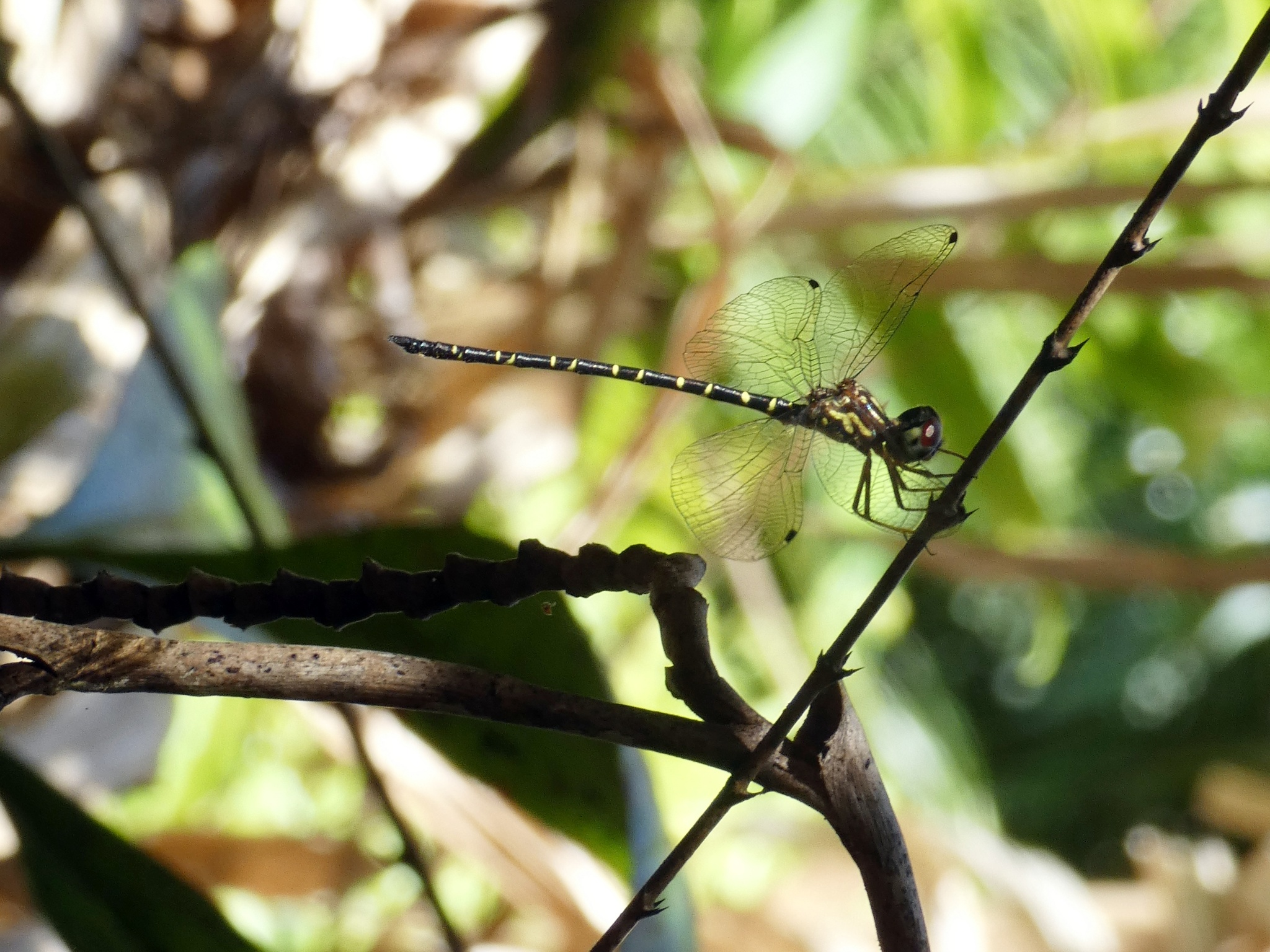
Male

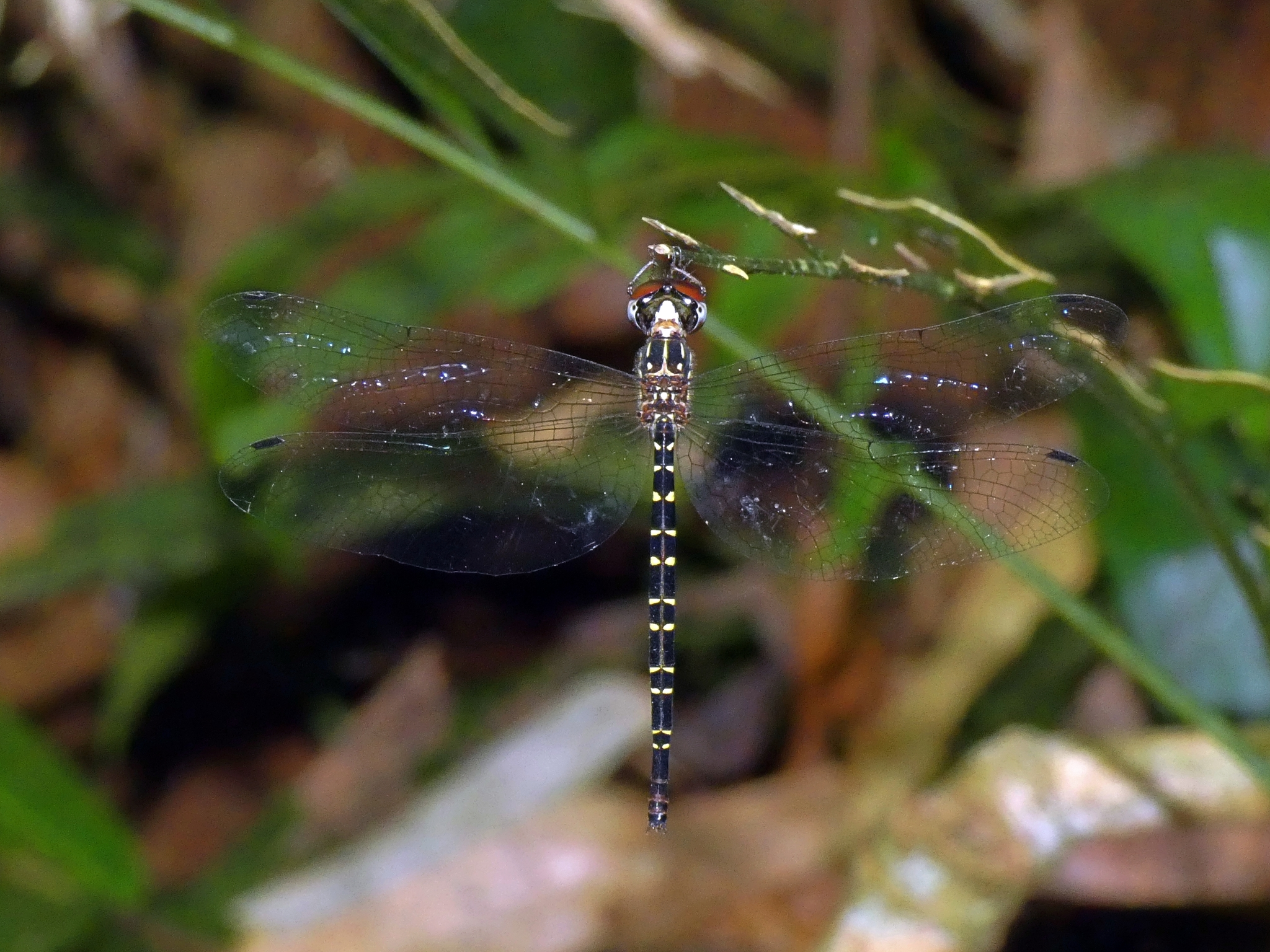
Female

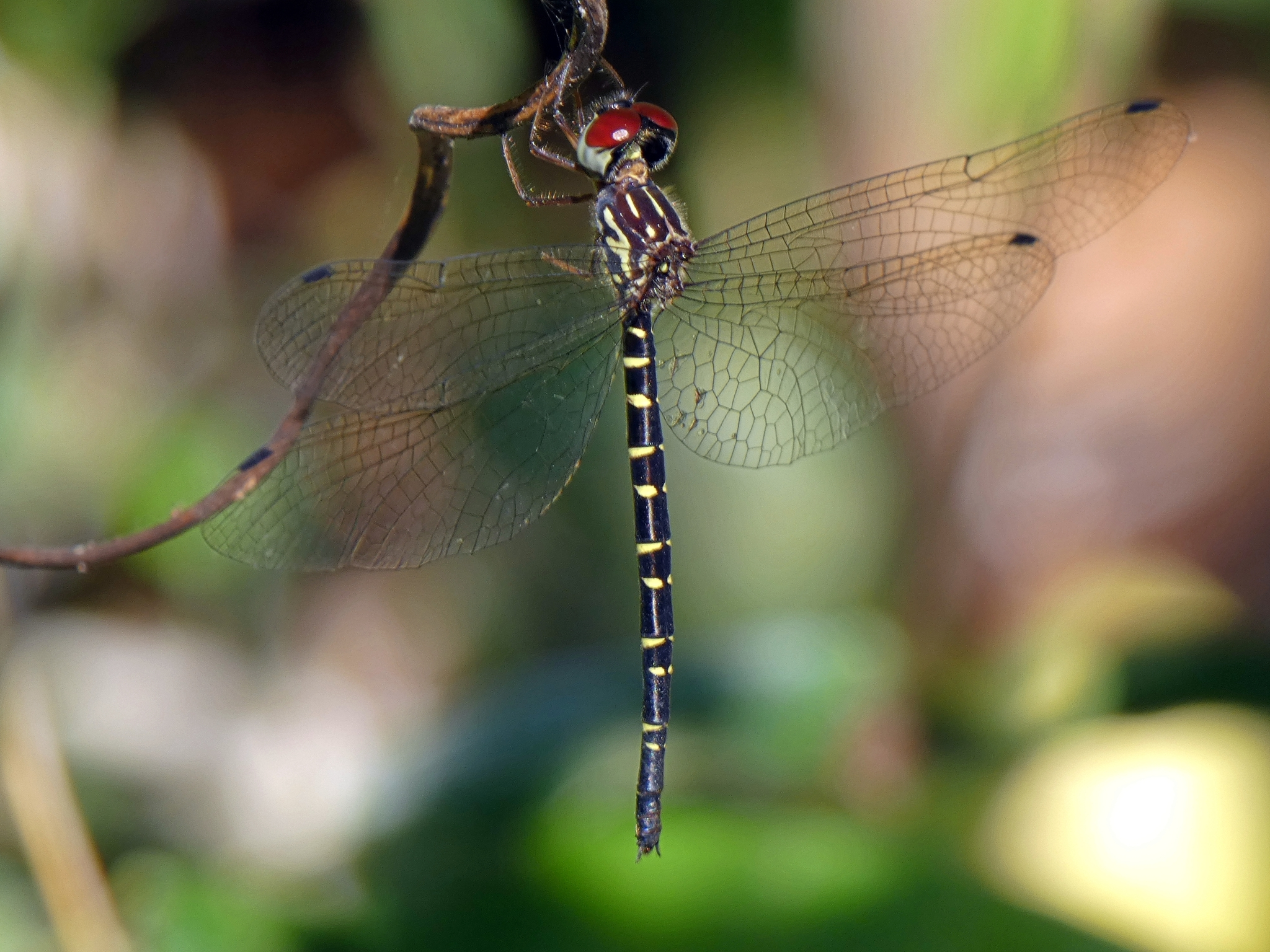
Female

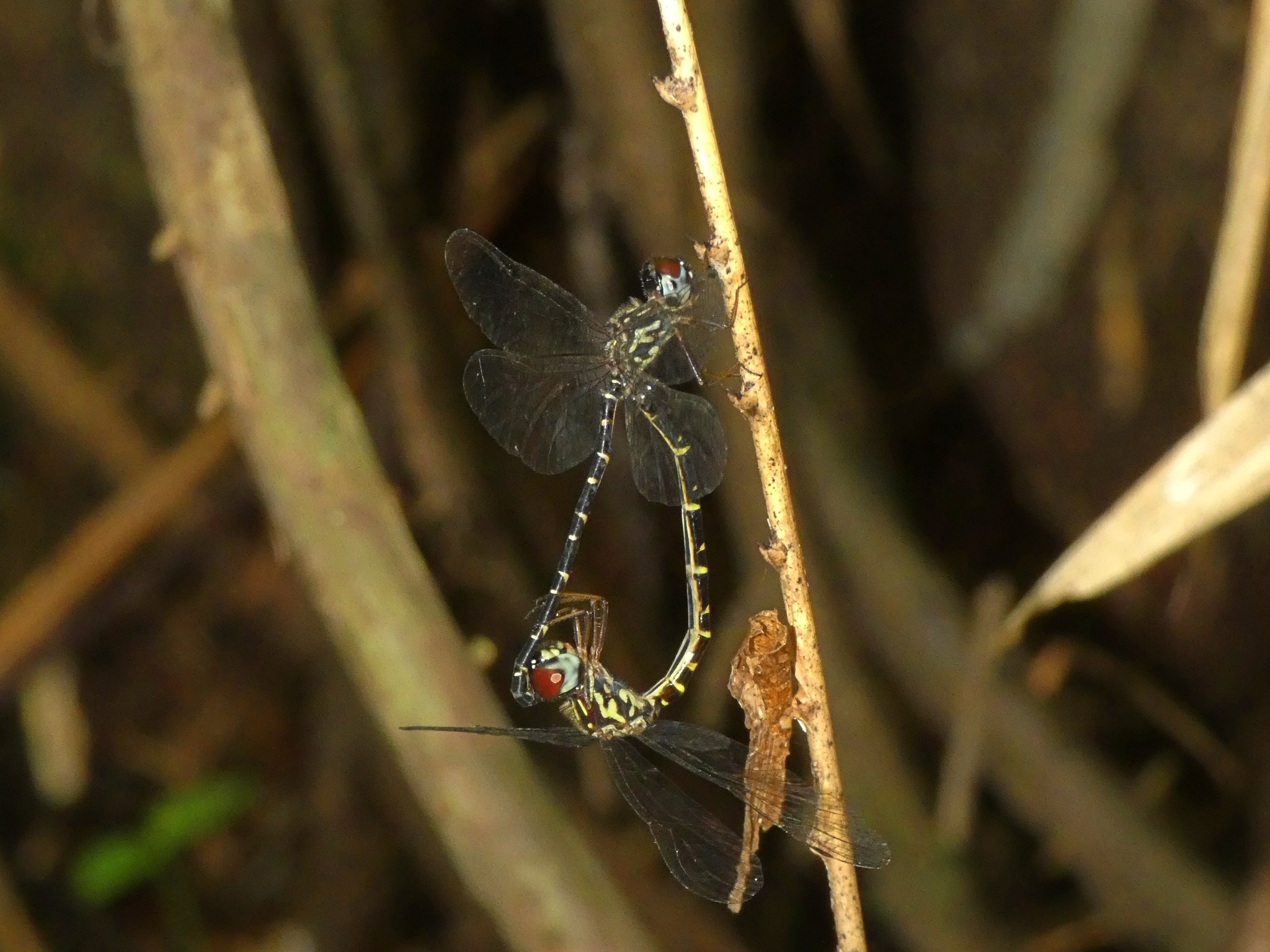
Mating

== See also ==
- List of Odonata species of Australia
