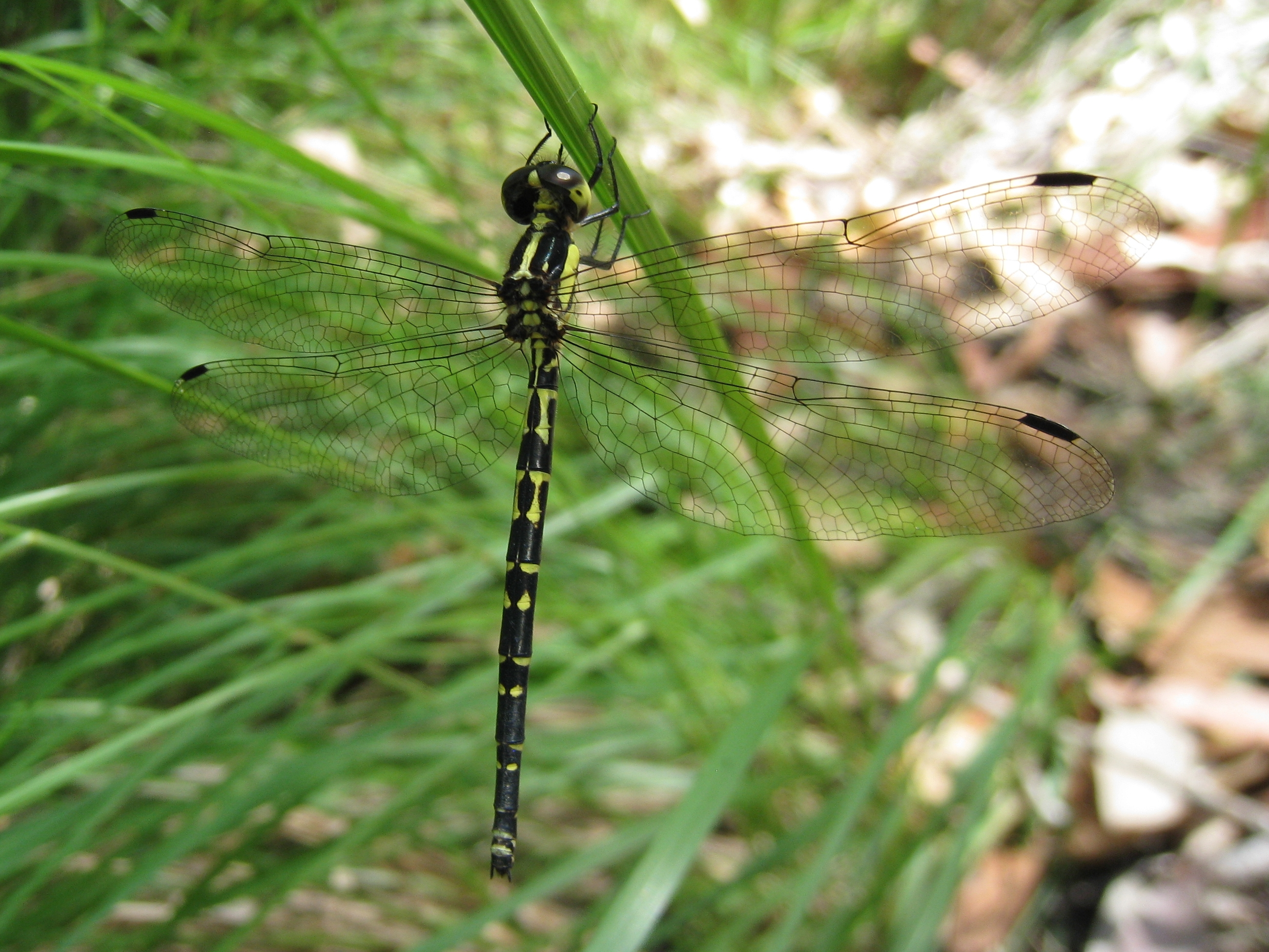
- Yellow-tipped tigertail

Scientific classification
- Kingdom: Animalia
- Phylum: Arthropoda
- Clade: Pancrustacea
- Class: Insecta
- Order: Odonata
- Suborder: Anisoptera
- Superfamily: Libelluloidea
- Family: Synthemistidae
- Genus: Choristhemis; Tillyard, 1910

= Choristhemis =

Genus of dragonflies

Choristhemis is a genus of small dragonflies in the family Synthemistidae found in eastern Australia. They are small to medium-sized slender dragonflies with dark colouring and light markings and a relatively weak flight.

== Species ==
The genus includes two species:

- Choristhemis flavoterminata (Martin, 1901) – yellow-tipped tigertail
- Choristhemis olivei (Tillyard, 1909) – delicate tigertail

== Etymology ==
The genus name Choristhemis is derived from the Greek χωρίς (chōris, "without") and the common dragonfly suffix -themis. The name refers to the absence of the small membranous flap at the base of the hindwing.
