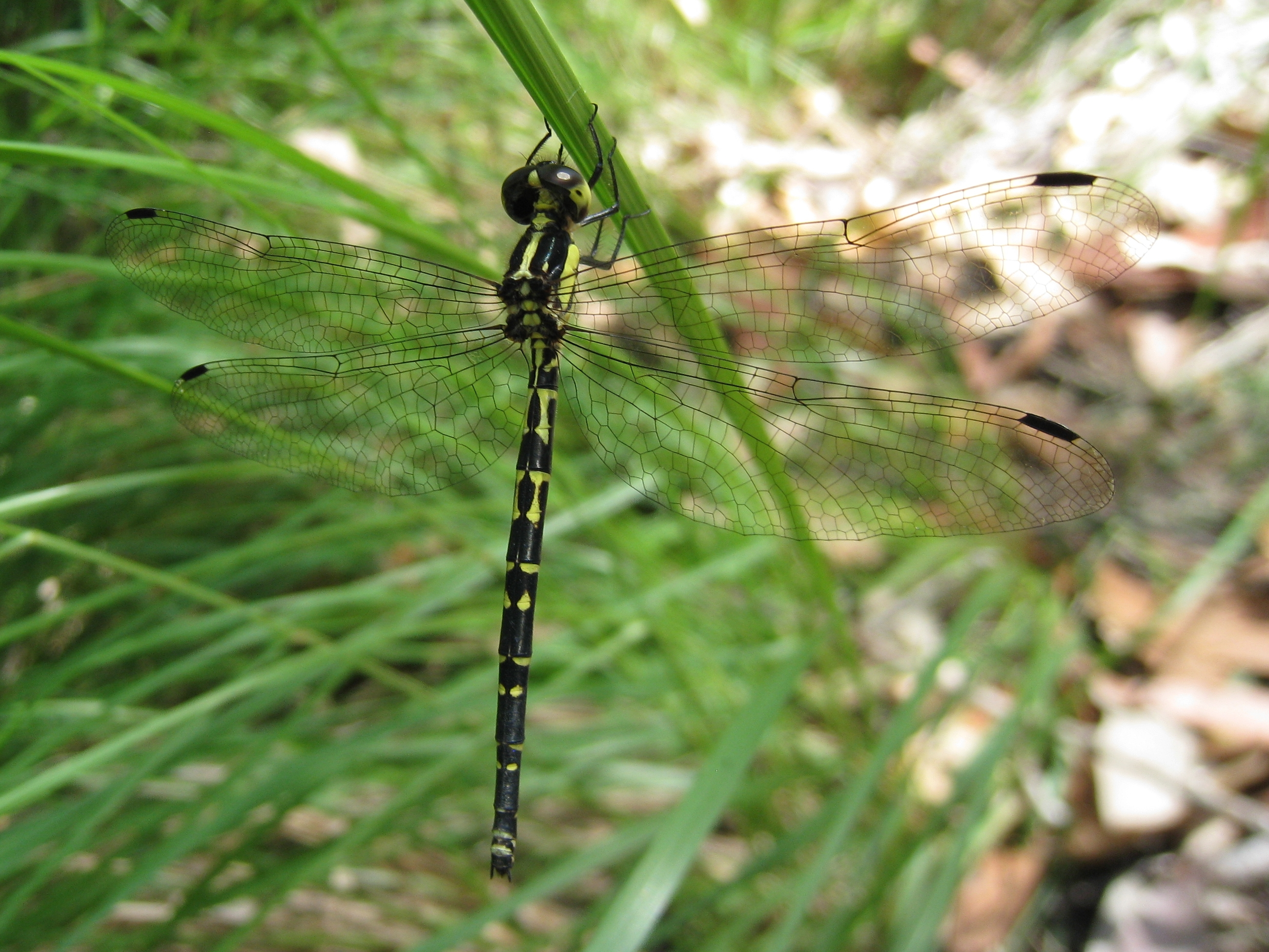
- Female
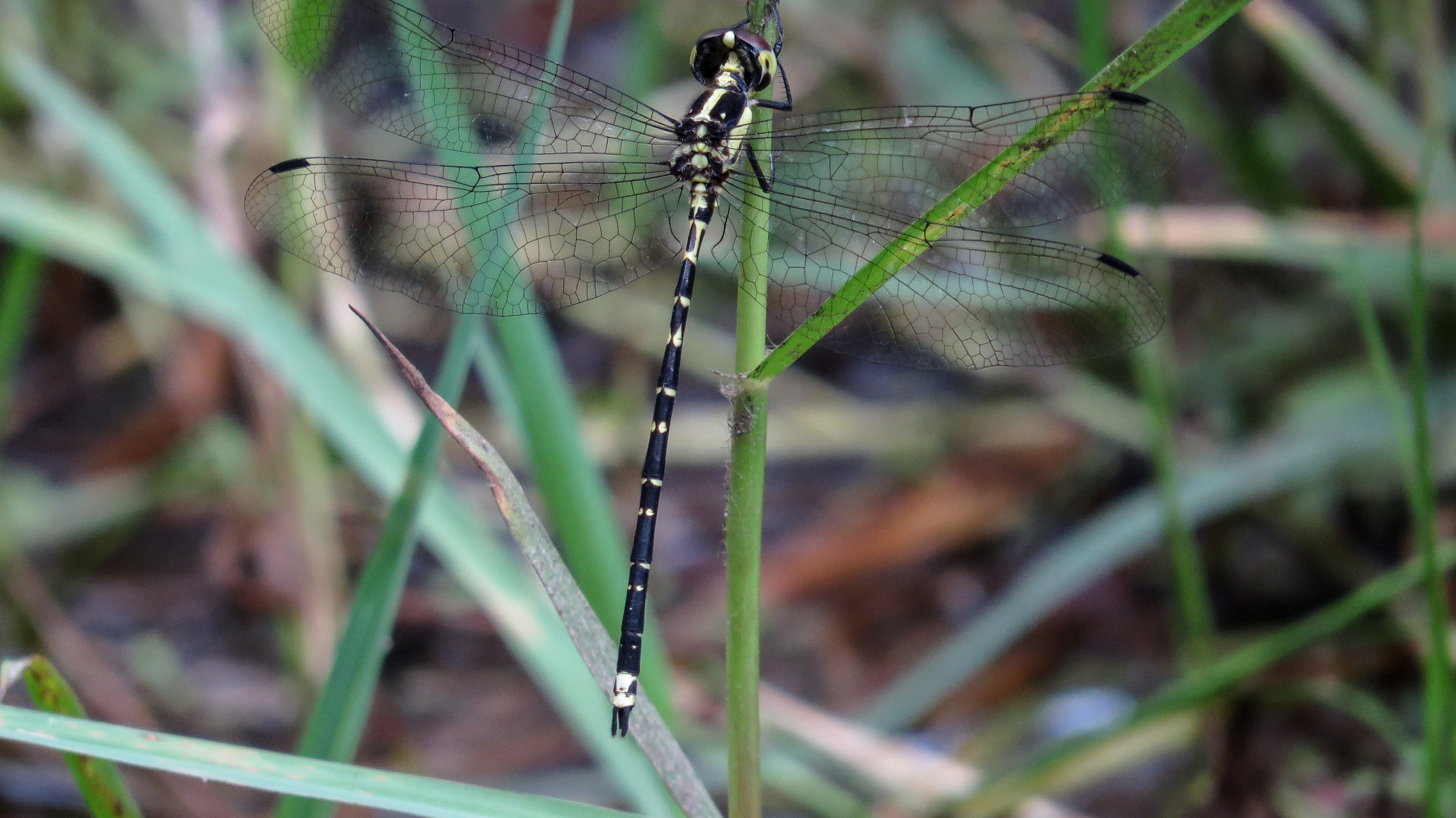
- Male

Conservation status
- Least Concern (IUCN 3.1)

Scientific classification
- Kingdom: Animalia
- Phylum: Arthropoda
- Clade: Pancrustacea
- Class: Insecta
- Order: Odonata
- Suborder: Anisoptera
- Superfamily: Libelluloidea
- Family: Synthemistidae
- Genus: Choristhemis
- Species: C. flavoterminata

Binomial name
- Choristhemis flavoterminata (Martin, 1901)

Synonyms
- Eusynthemis paradoxa Förster, 1908; Synthemis flavoterminata Martin, 1901

= Choristhemis flavoterminata =

Yellow-tipped tigertail

Species of dragonfly

Choristhemis flavoterminata, the yellow-tipped tigertail, is a species of dragonfly from the family Synthemistidae found in New South Wales and Queensland, Australia. Yellow-tipped tigertails inhabit streams and rivers and can be found amongst mud and gravel.

== Early life ==
At hatching, yellow-tipped tigertail larvae are about 7.5 mm long, and measure 4.1 mm from each side of the head. The abdomen consists of a small quantity of hair, measures 12.1 mm, and is relatively thin. They are light gray or brown in color, later maturing into a deeper shade of that specific color. Larvae burrow into the mud for protection, but they are endangered by underwater predators capable of digging through the mud burrows from the main body of water, and eating the larvae. Once mature, yellow-tipped tigertail larvae become predators, feeding on smaller bugs.

== Body ==
The average yellow-tipped tigertail has a body length around 47 mm. Its body is long, ending with a bright yellow spot, and its abdomen is thin. Its wings have a slight brown tint and a dark brown rectangular spot. Yellow-tipped tigertails are believed to fake death when frightened by folding their legs across their bodies until they no longer feel threatened, at which point they fly away. They do so most commonly when they are lying on their dorsal or ventral surfaces.

== Etymology ==
The genus name Choristhemis is derived from the Greek χωρίς (chōris, "without") and the common dragonfly suffix -themis. The name refers to the absence of the small membranous flap at the base of the hindwing.

The species name flavoterminata is derived from the Latin flavus ("yellow") and terminus ("end" or "boundary"), referring to the yellow colour at the tip of the abdomen.

== Gallery ==
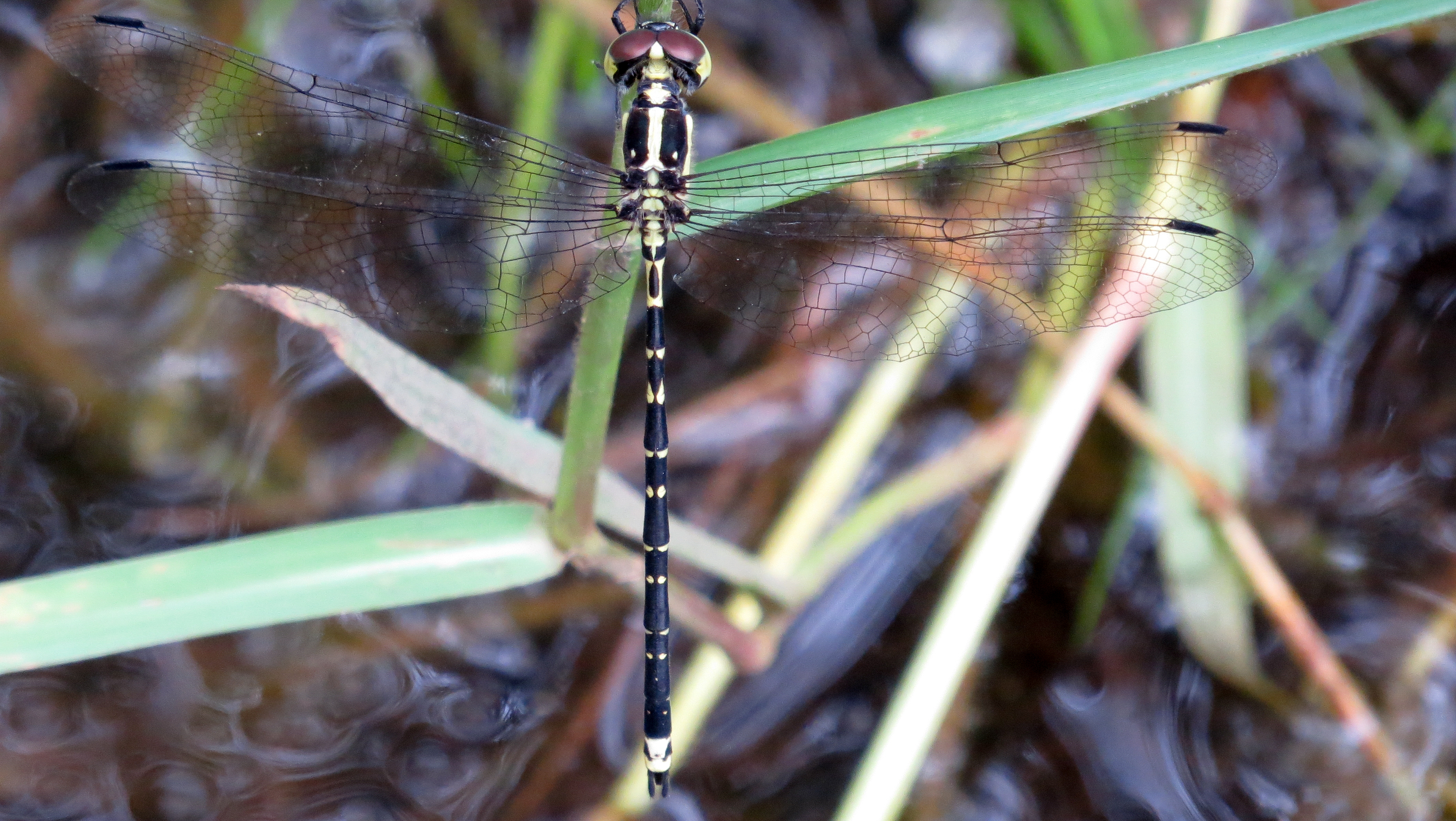
Male

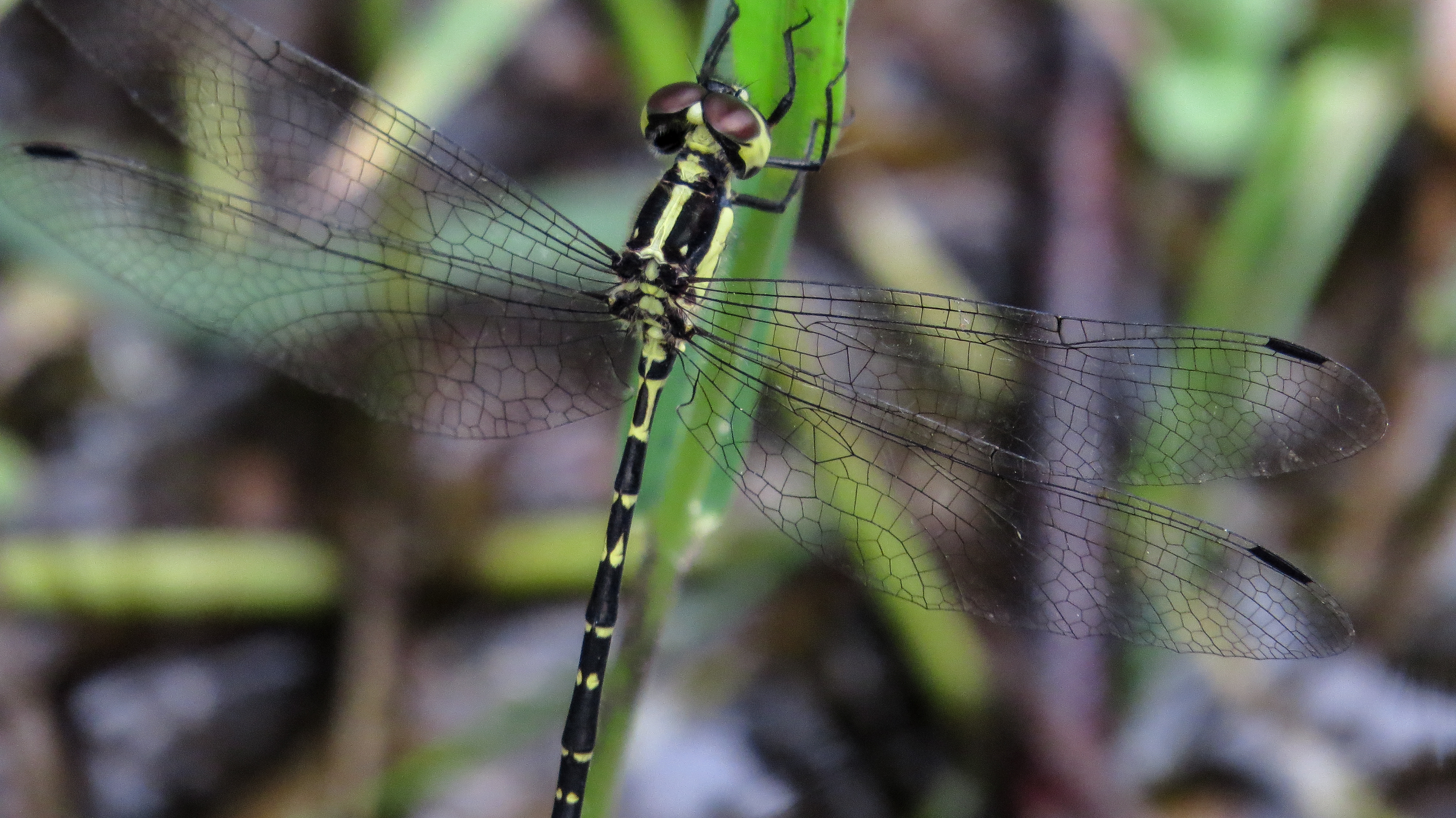
Wings

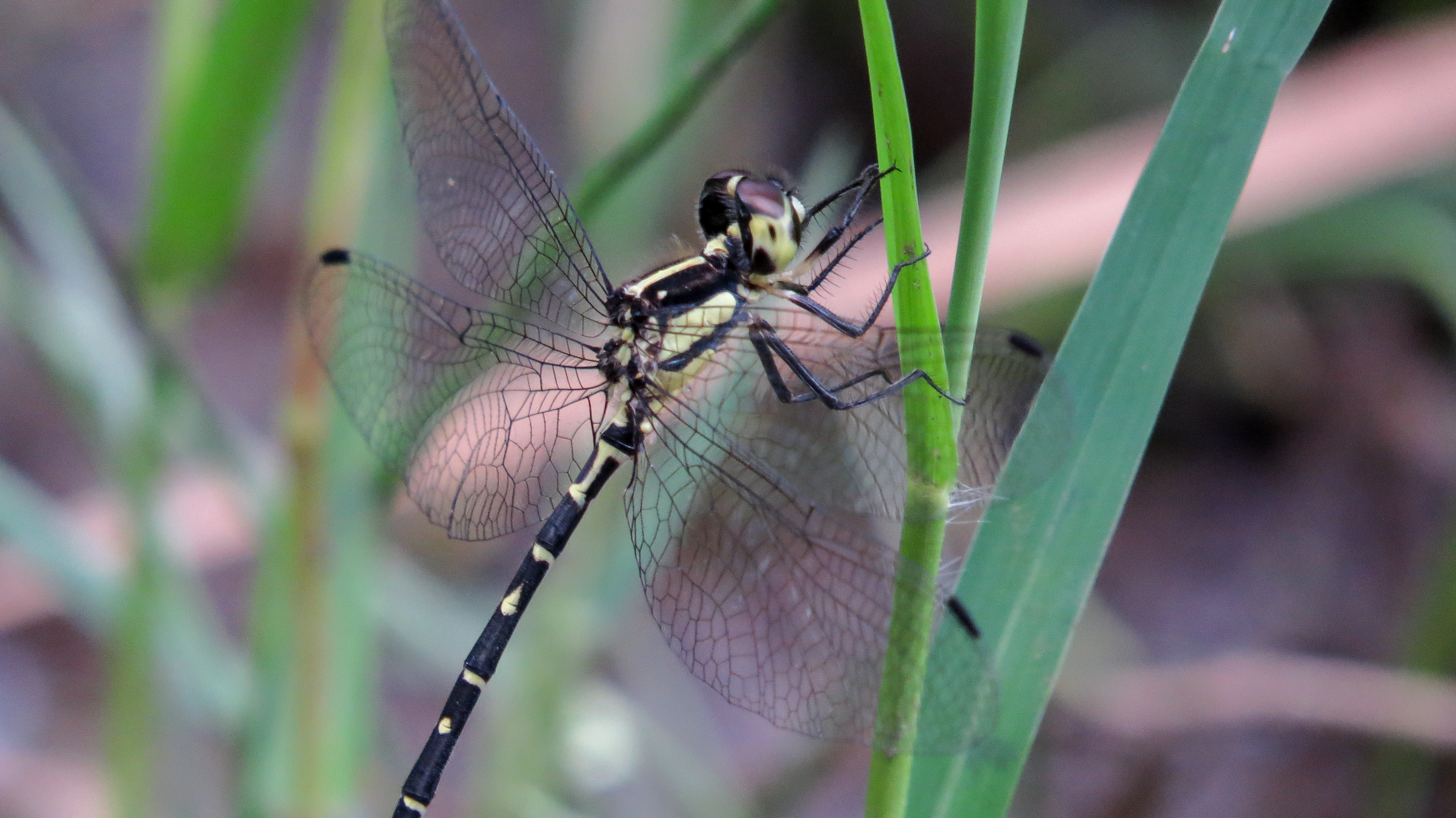
Side view

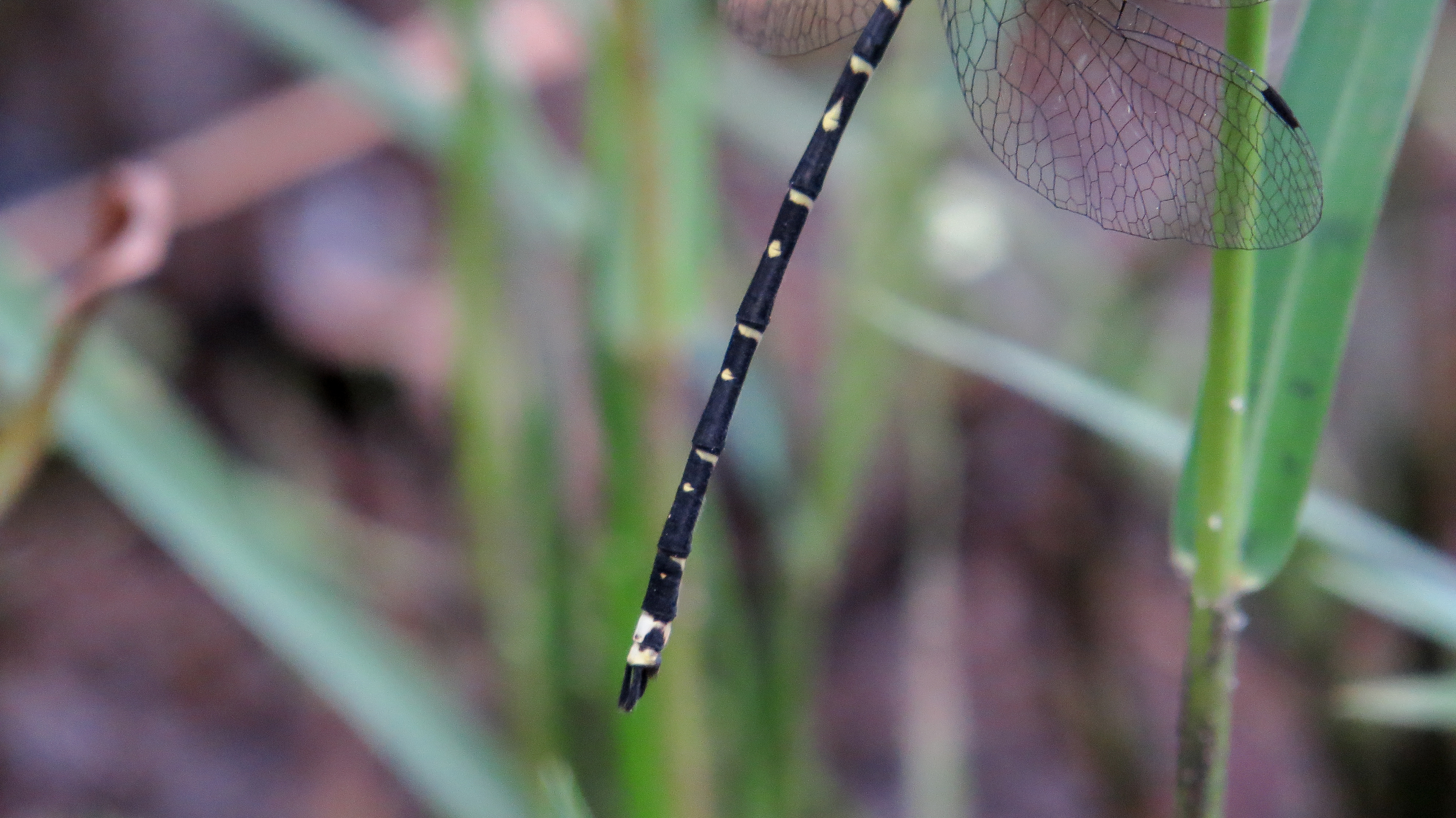
Male tail

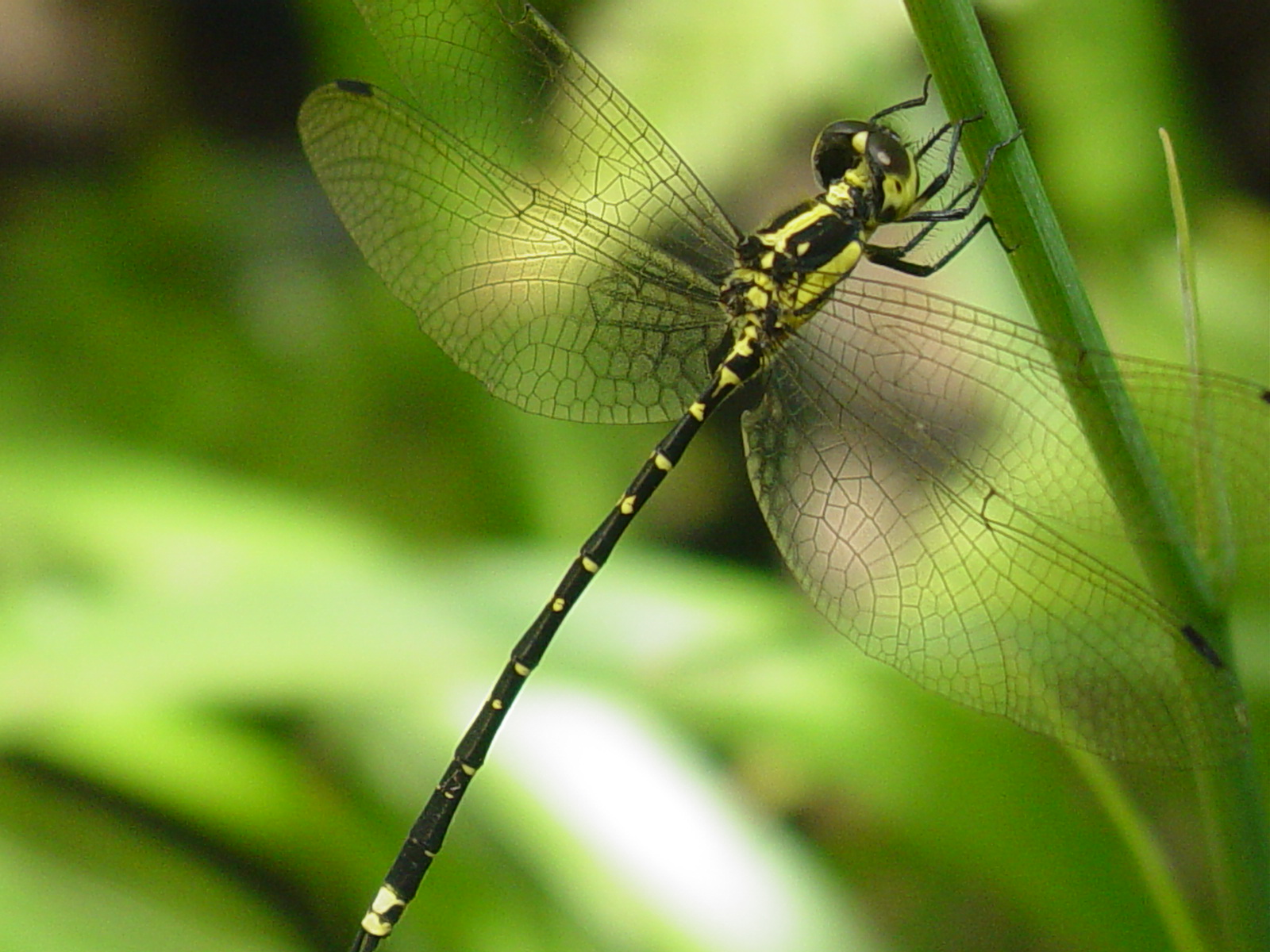
Male

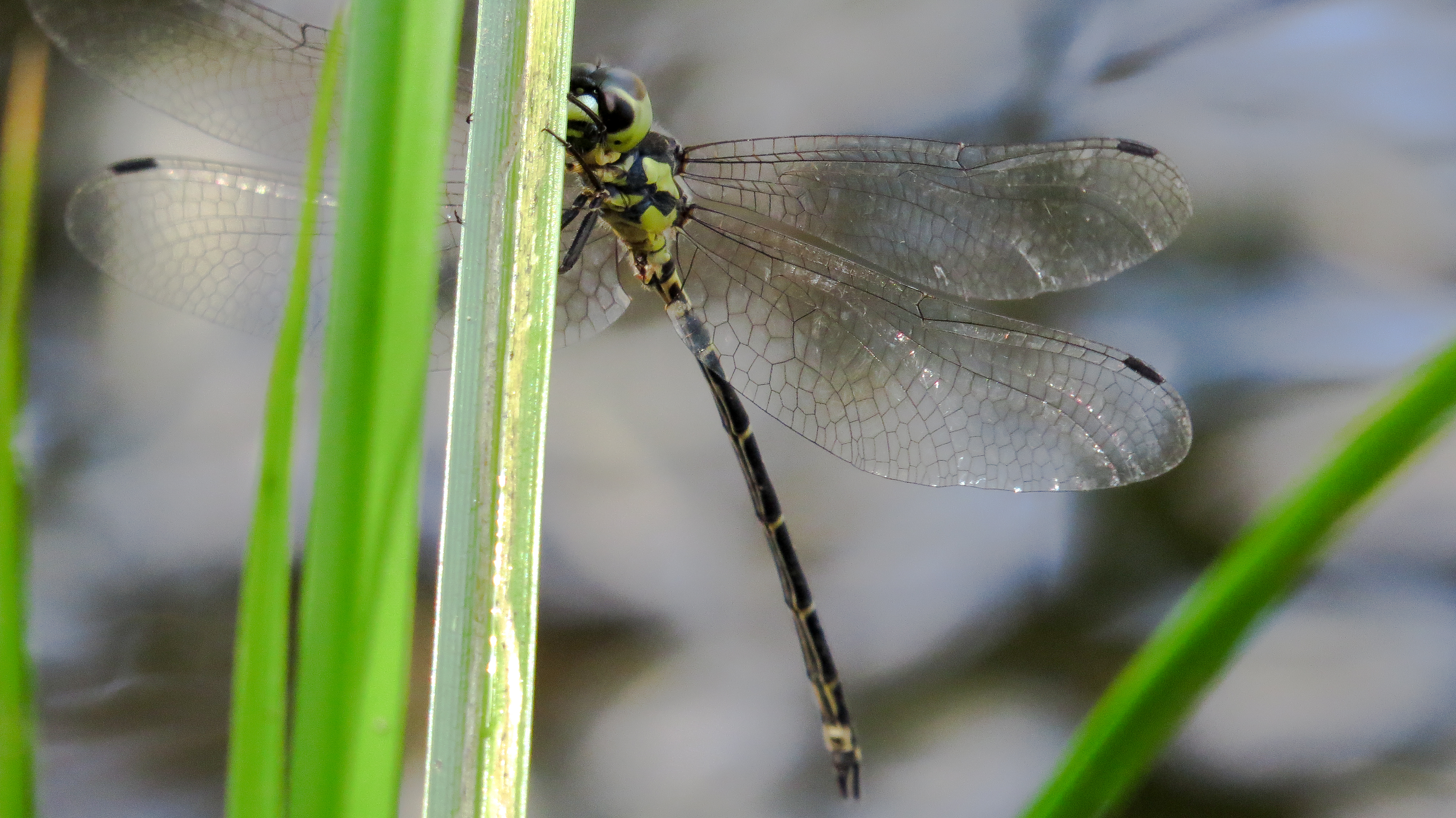
Male, viewed from under

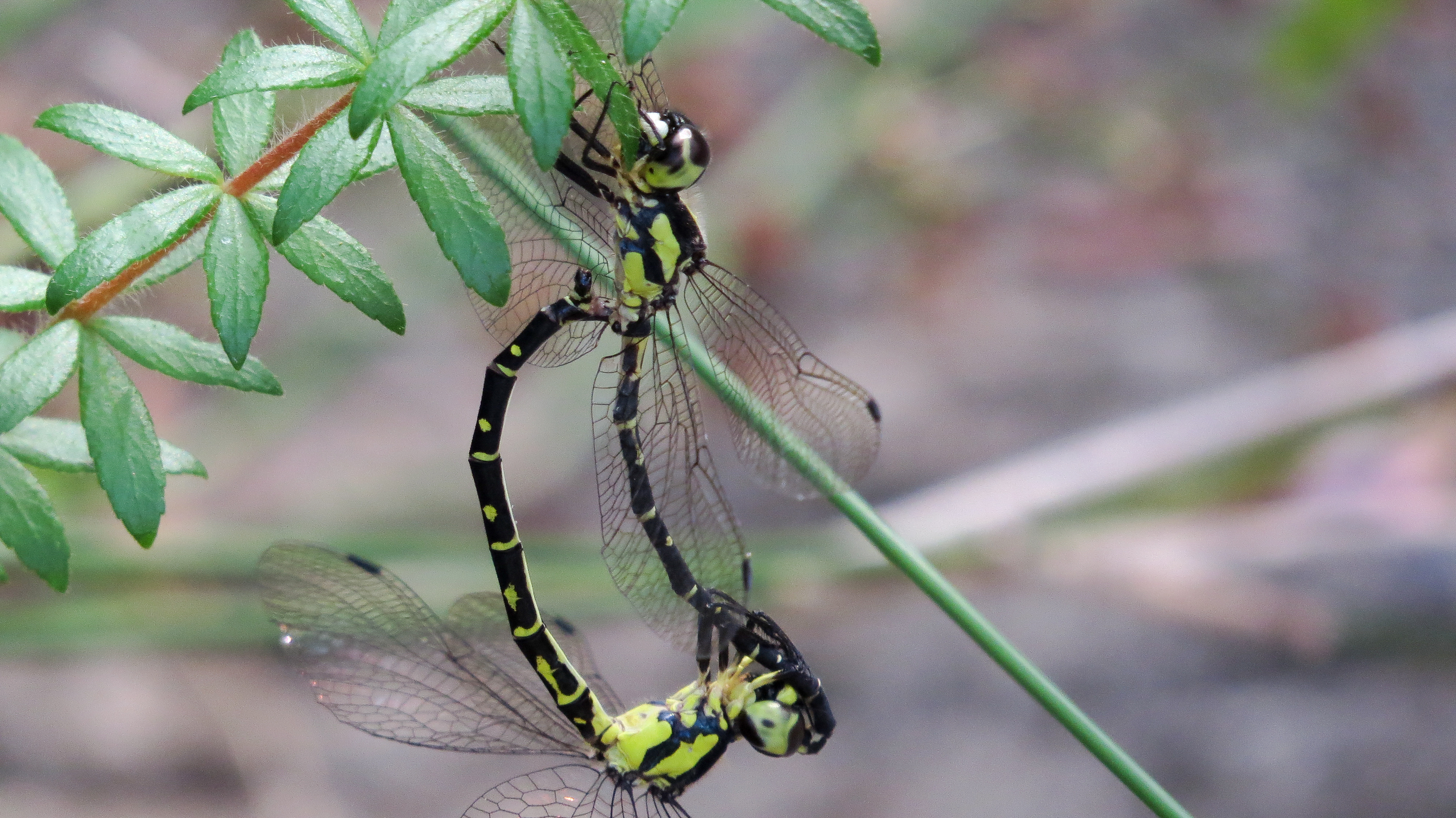
Mating, male is on top

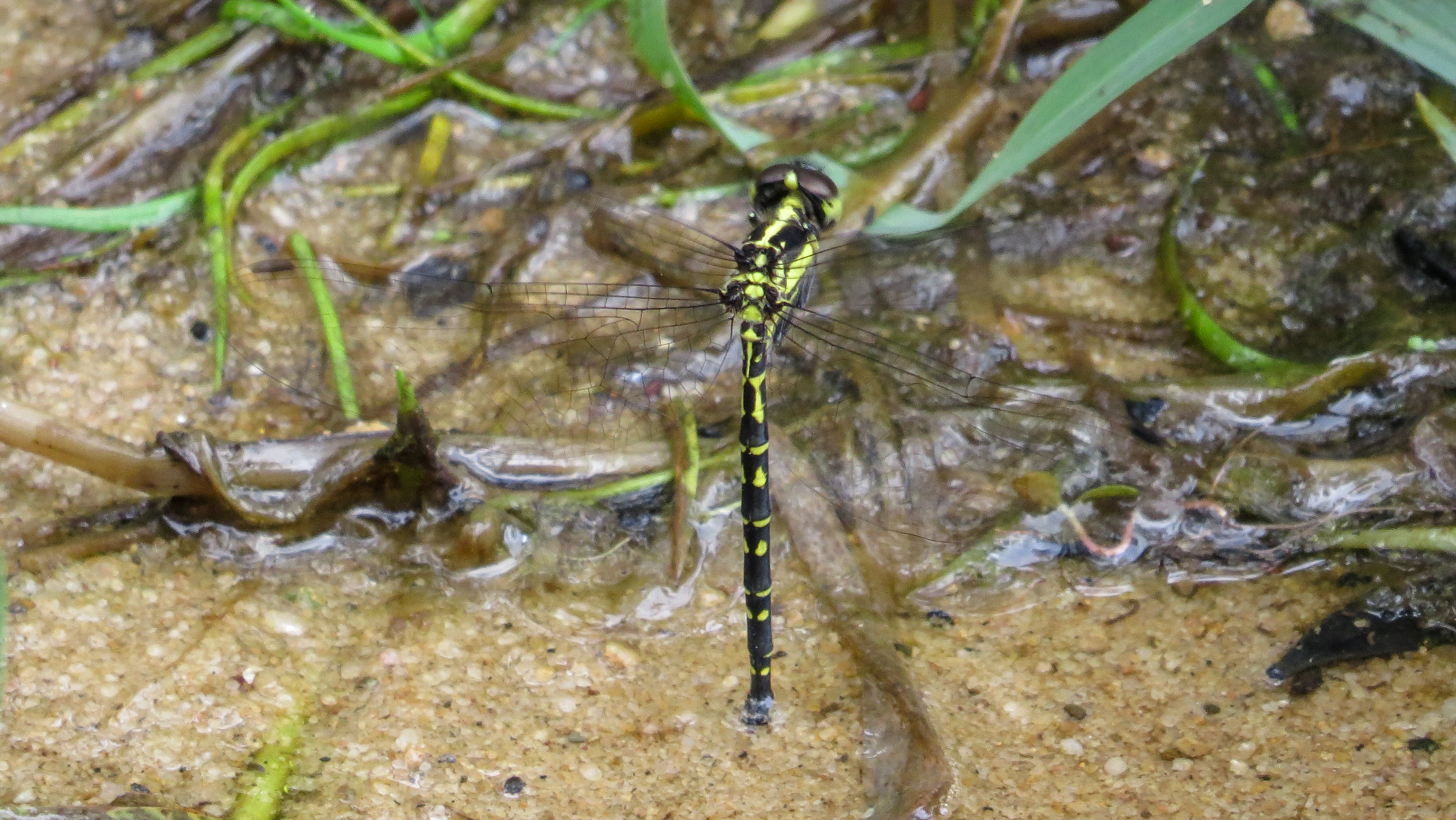
Female is ovipositing, laying her eggs in a shallow stream

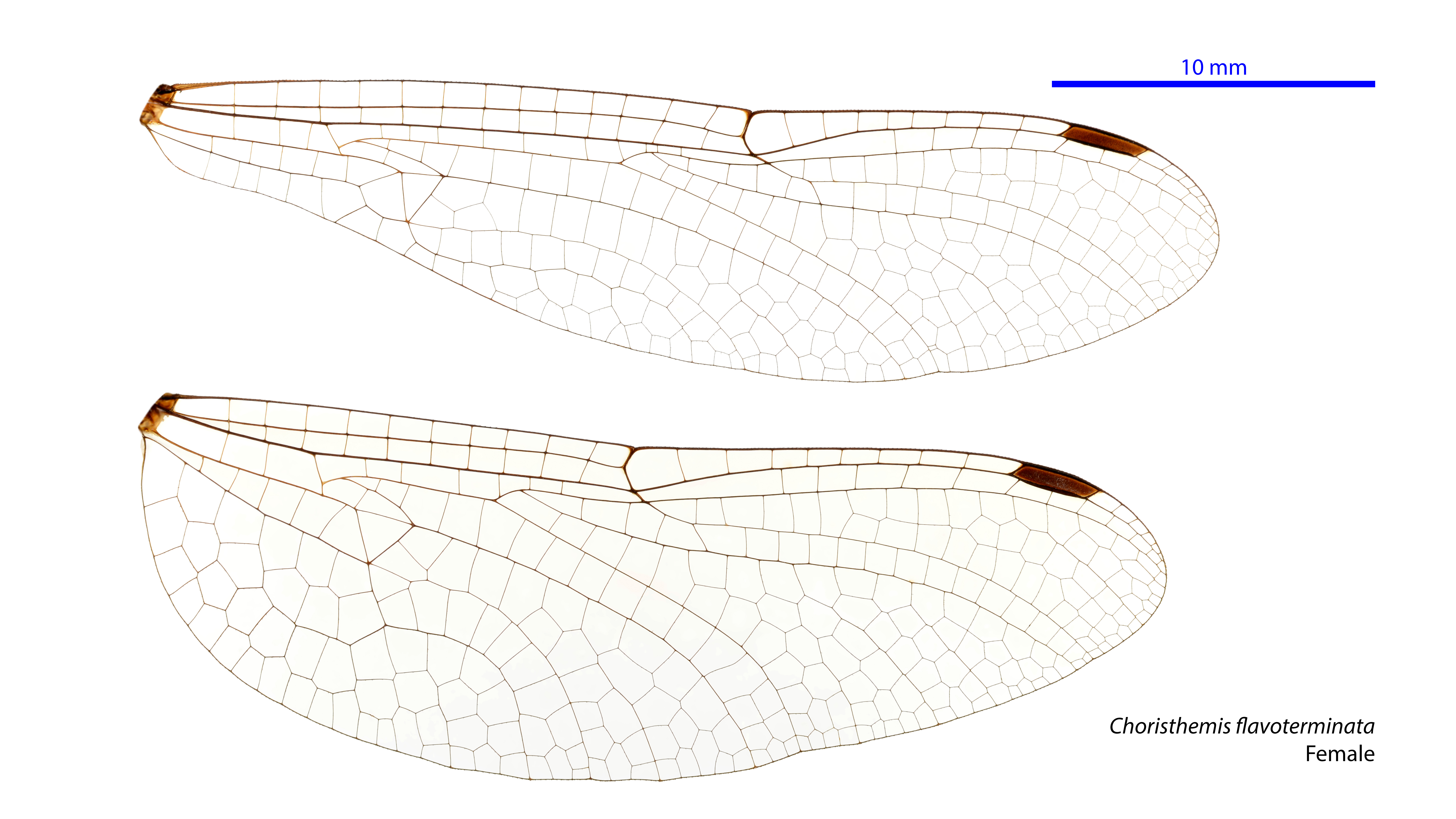
Female wings

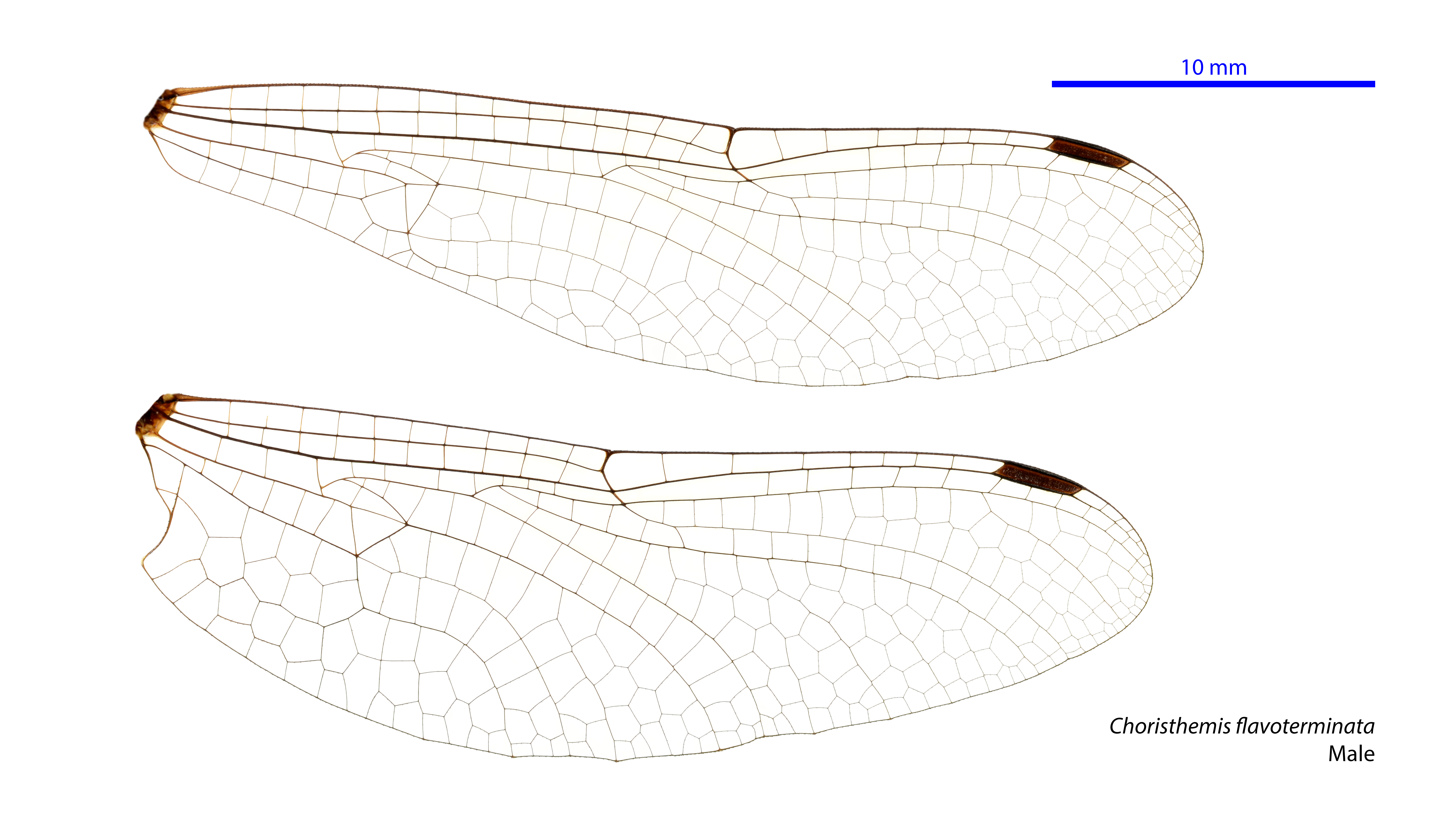
Male wings

== See also ==
- List of Odonata species of Australia
