= Archaeosynthemis spiniger =

Spiny tigertail

Conservation status
- Vulnerable (IUCN 3.1)

Scientific classification
- Kingdom: Animalia
- Phylum: Arthropoda
- Clade: Pancrustacea
- Class: Insecta
- Order: Odonata
- Suborder: Anisoptera
- Superfamily: Libelluloidea
- Family: Synthemistidae
- Genus: Archaeosynthemis
- Species: A. spiniger

Binomial name
- Archaeosynthemis spiniger (Tillyard, 1913)

Synonyms
- Synthemis spiniger Tillyard, 1913

Species of dragonfly

Archaeosynthemis spiniger is a species of dragonfly of the family Synthemistidae, known as the spiny tigertail. It is a medium-sized dragonfly with black and yellow markings. It inhabits streams and rivers in south-western Australia.

Archaeosynthemis spiniger was once known as Synthemis spiniger.

== Etymology ==
The genus name Archaeosynthemis combines the Greek ἀρχαῖος (arkhaios, "ancient" or "archaic") with Synthemis, an existing genus of dragonflies.

The species name spiniger is Latin for "thorn-bearing" or "spine-bearing", referring to the spine on the male appendages.

== Gallery ==
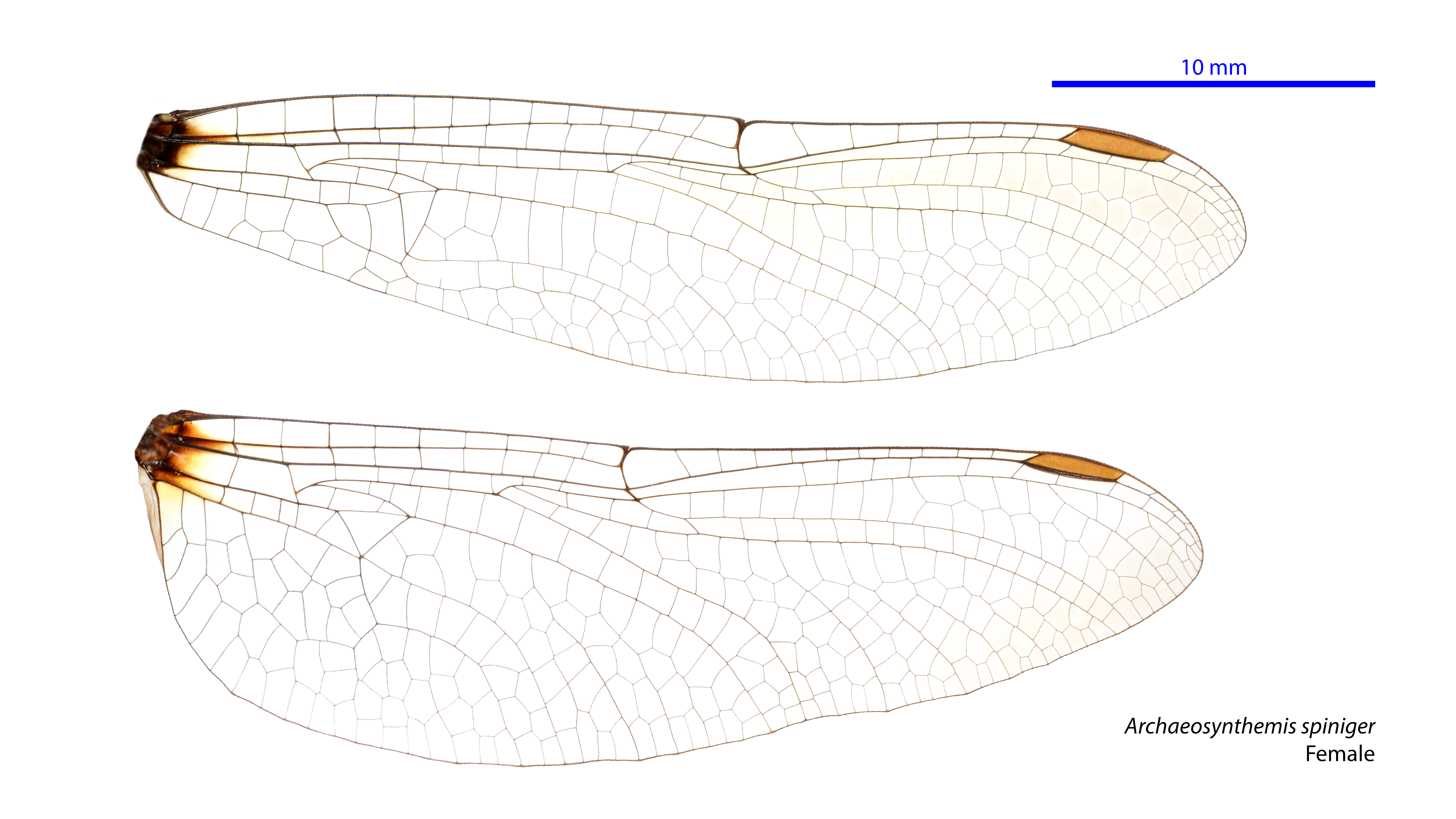
Female wings

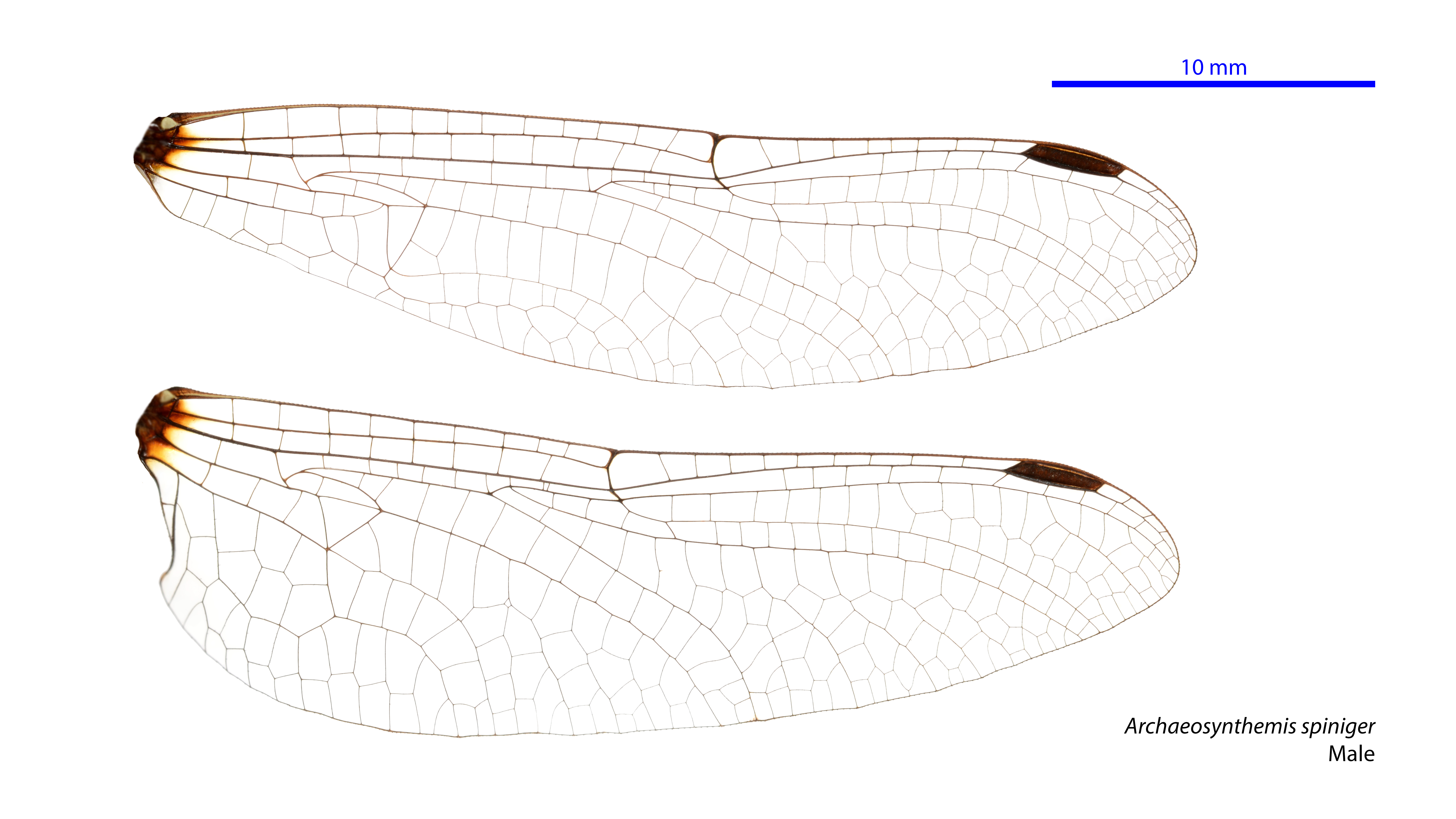
Male wings

== See also ==
- List of Odonata species of Australia
