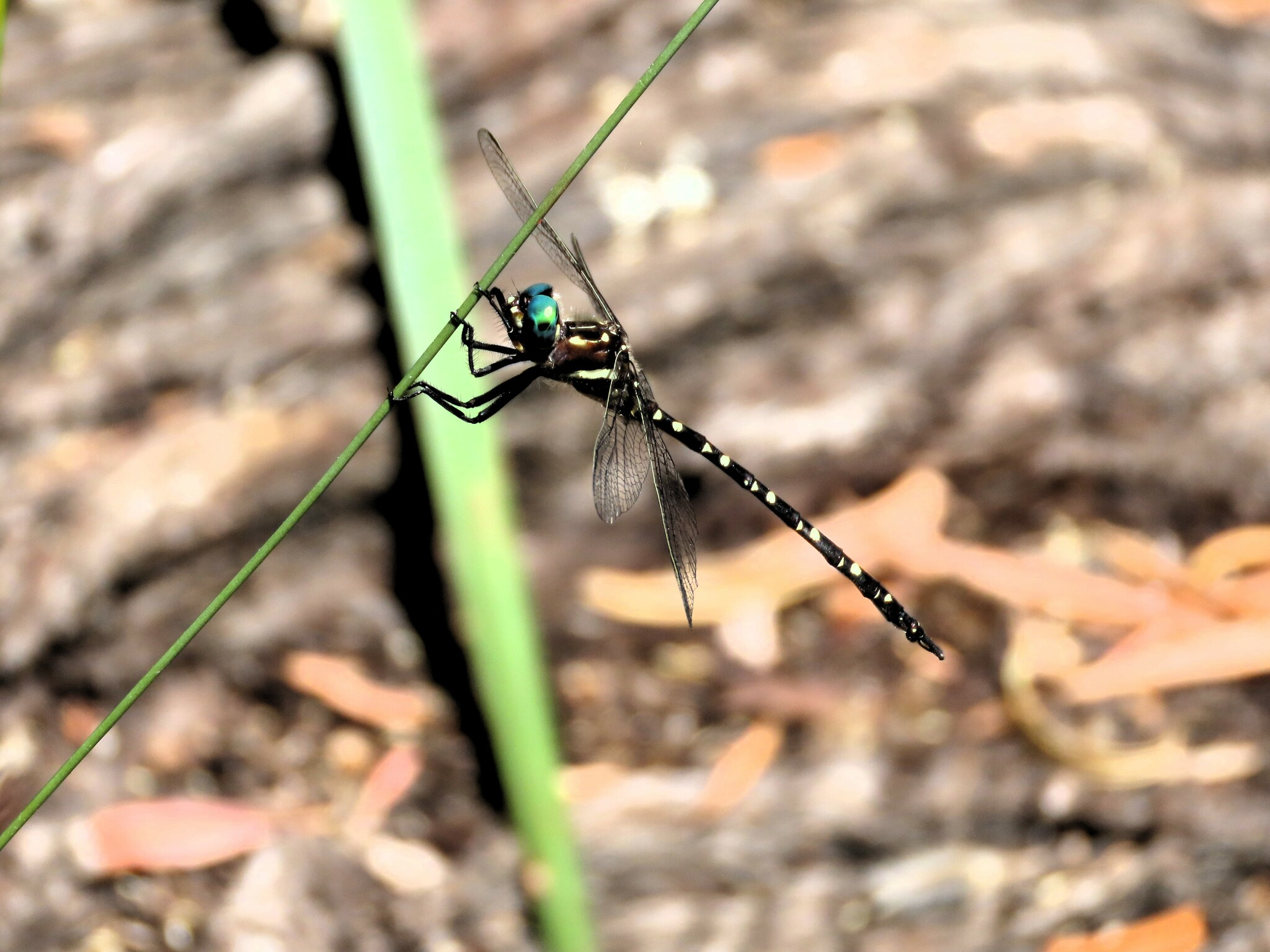

Conservation status
- Least Concern (IUCN 3.1)

Scientific classification
- Kingdom: Animalia
- Phylum: Arthropoda
- Clade: Pancrustacea
- Class: Insecta
- Order: Odonata
- Suborder: Anisoptera
- Superfamily: Libelluloidea
- Family: Synthemistidae
- Genus: Archaeosynthemis
- Species: A. leachii

Binomial name
- Archaeosynthemis leachii (Selys, 1871)

Synonyms
- Synthemis leachii Selys, 1871; Synthemis martini Tillyard, 1908

= Archaeosynthemis leachii =

Twinspot tigertail

Species of dragonfly

Archaeosynthemis leachii is a species of dragonfly of the family Synthemistidae, known as the twinspot tigertail. It is a medium-sized dragonfly with black and yellow markings. It inhabits streams, seepages and swamps in south-western Australia.

== Taxonomy ==
Archaeosynthemis leachii was originally named Synthemis leachii, and has also been known as Synthemis martini.

== Etymology ==
The genus name Archaeosynthemis combines the Greek ἀρχαῖος (arkhaios, "ancient" or "archaic") with Synthemis, an existing genus of dragonflies.

In 1871, Selys named this species leachii, an eponym honouring the late English zoologist and marine biologist William Elford Leach (1791–1836).

== Gallery ==
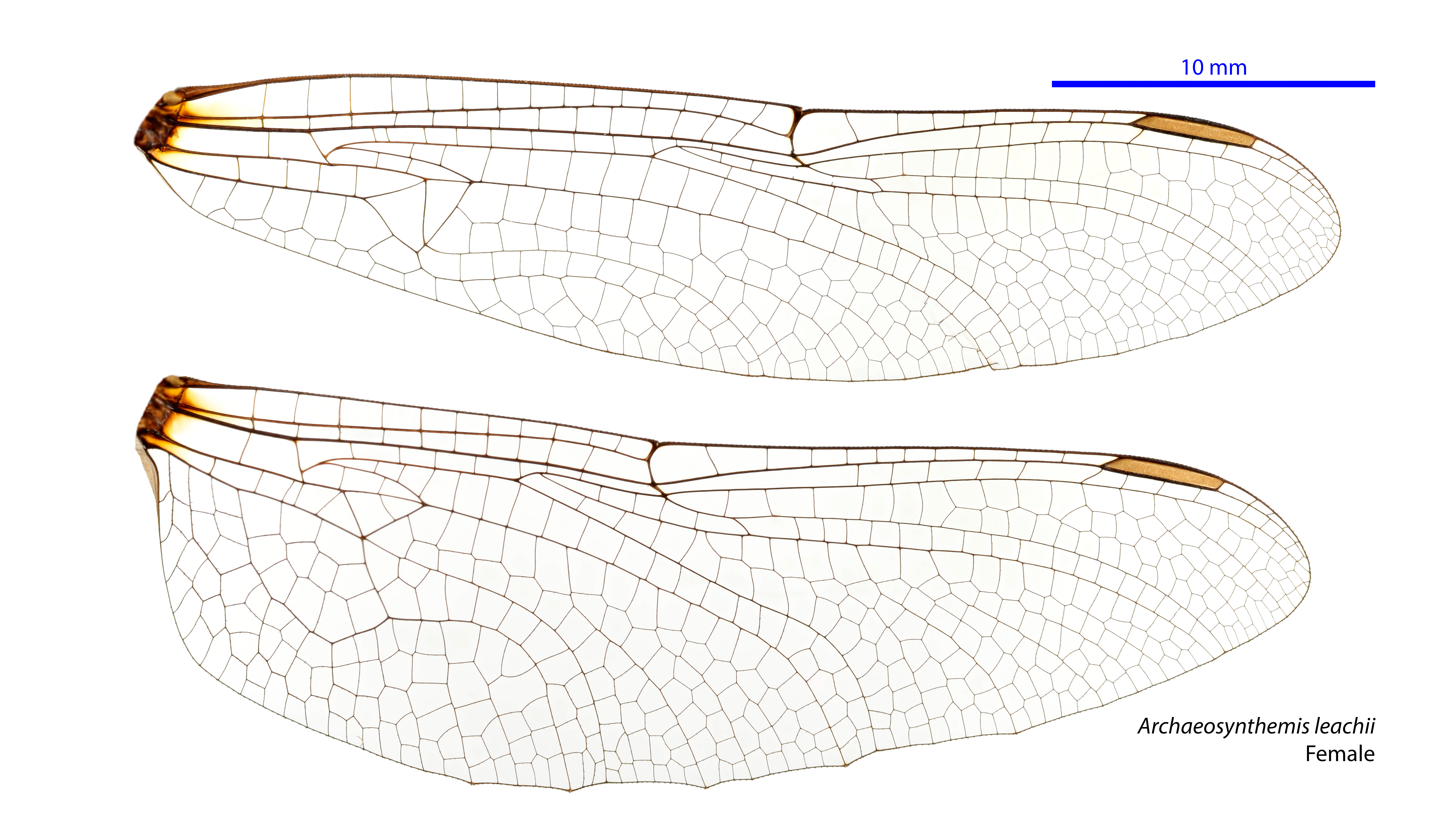
Female wings

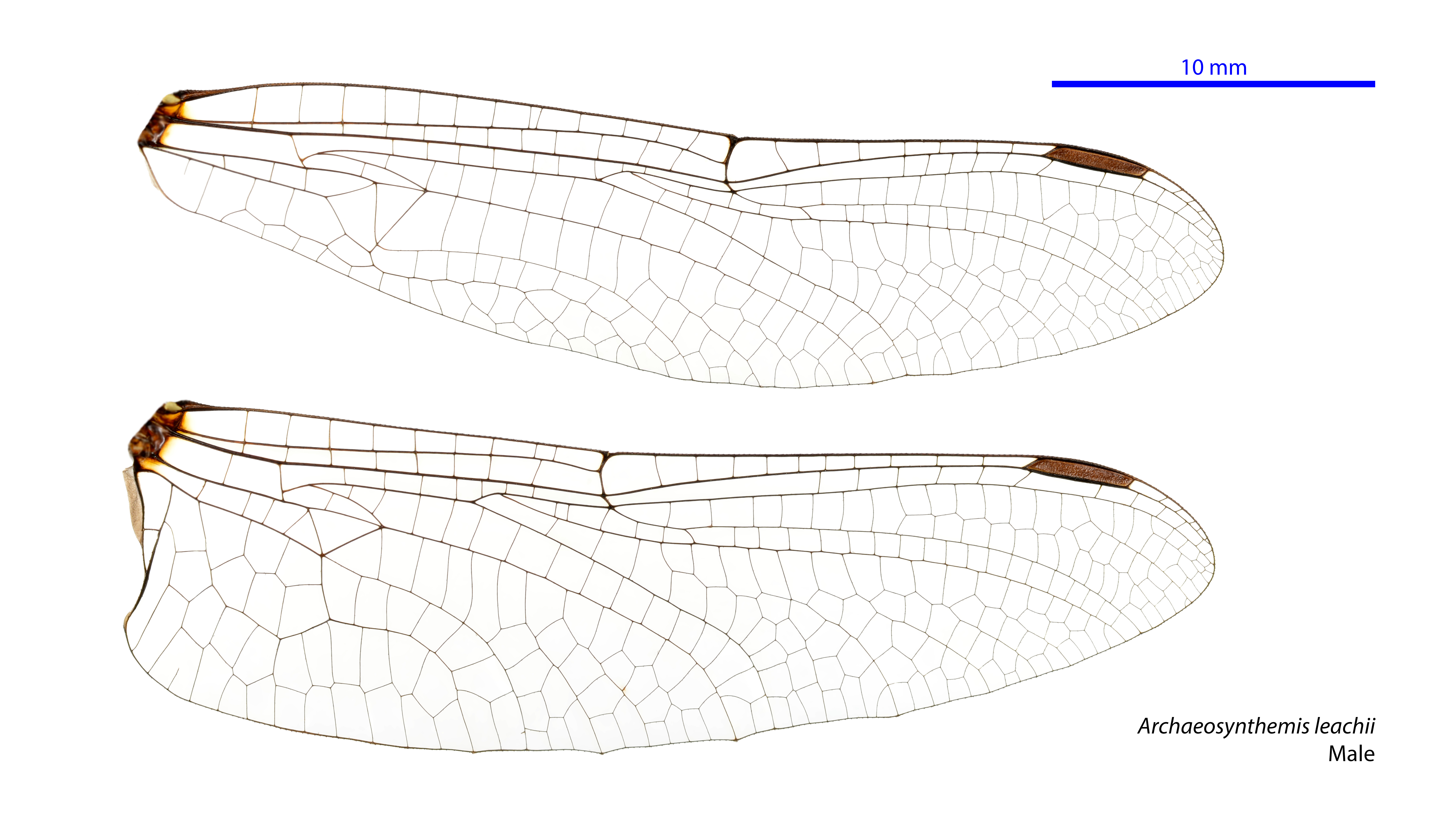
Male wings

== See also ==
- List of Odonata species of Australia
