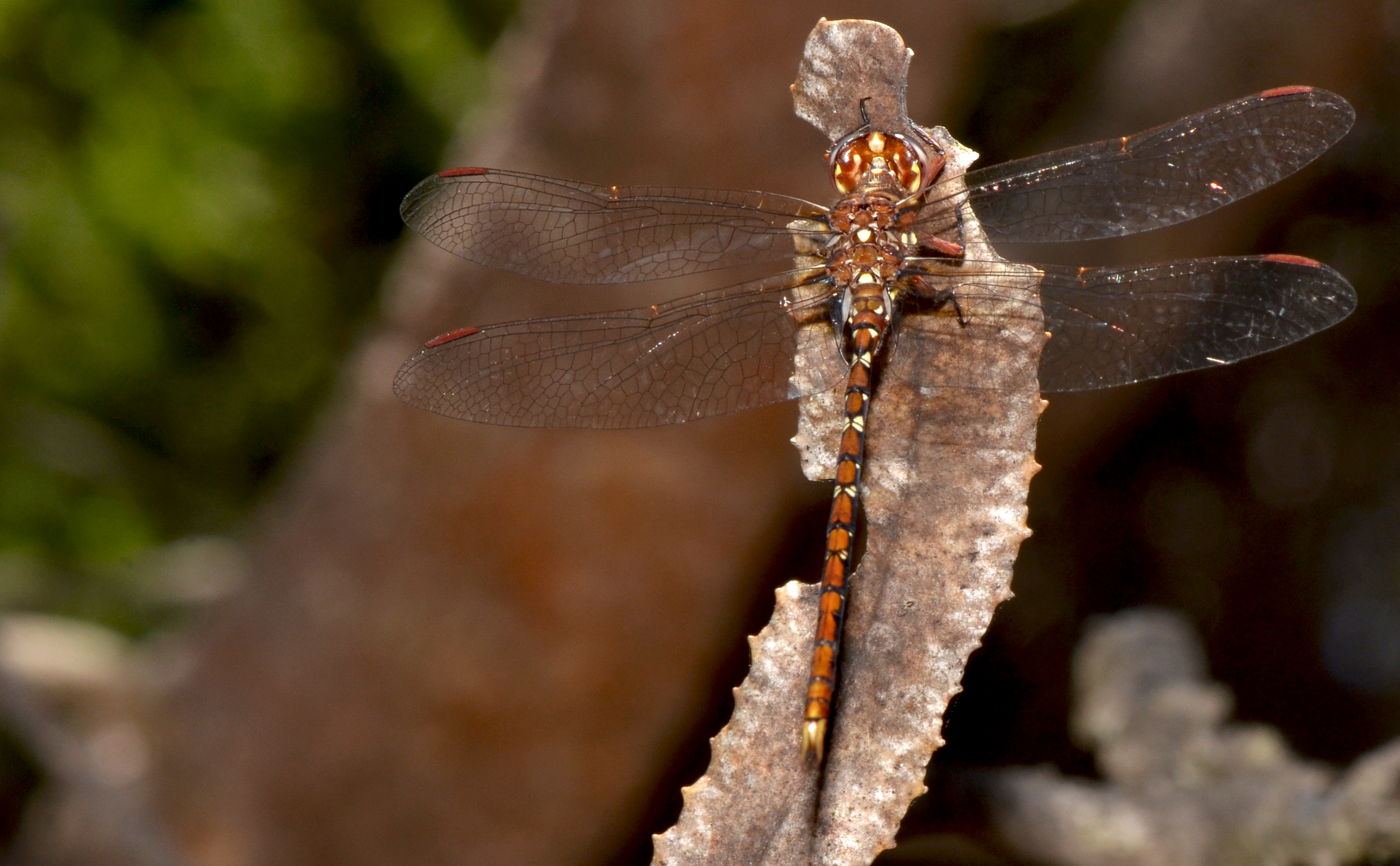
- Archaeosynthemis orientalis

Scientific classification
- Kingdom: Animalia
- Phylum: Arthropoda
- Clade: Pancrustacea
- Class: Insecta
- Order: Odonata
- Suborder: Anisoptera
- Superfamily: Libelluloidea
- Family: Synthemistidae
- Genus: Archaeosynthemis; Carle, 1995

= Archaeosynthemis =

Genus of dragonflies

Archaeosynthemis is a genus of dragonflies belonging to the family Synthemistidae. Species of Archaeosynthemis are found across southern Australia. They are medium-sized dragonflies characterized by their black or brown colouring with yellow markings.

== Etymology ==
The genus name Archaeosynthemis combines the Greek ἀρχαῖος (arkhaios, "ancient" or "archaic") with Synthemis, an existing genus of dragonflies.

== Species ==
The genus Archaeosynthemis includes the following species:

- Archaeosynthemis leachii (Selys, 1871) - Twinspot tigertail
- Archaeosynthemis occidentalis Tillyard, 1910 - Western brown tigertail
- Archaeosynthemis orientalis Tillyard, 1910 - Eastern brown tigertail
- Archaeosynthemis spiniger (Tillyard, 1913) - Spiny tigertail

== See also ==
- List of Odonata species of Australia
