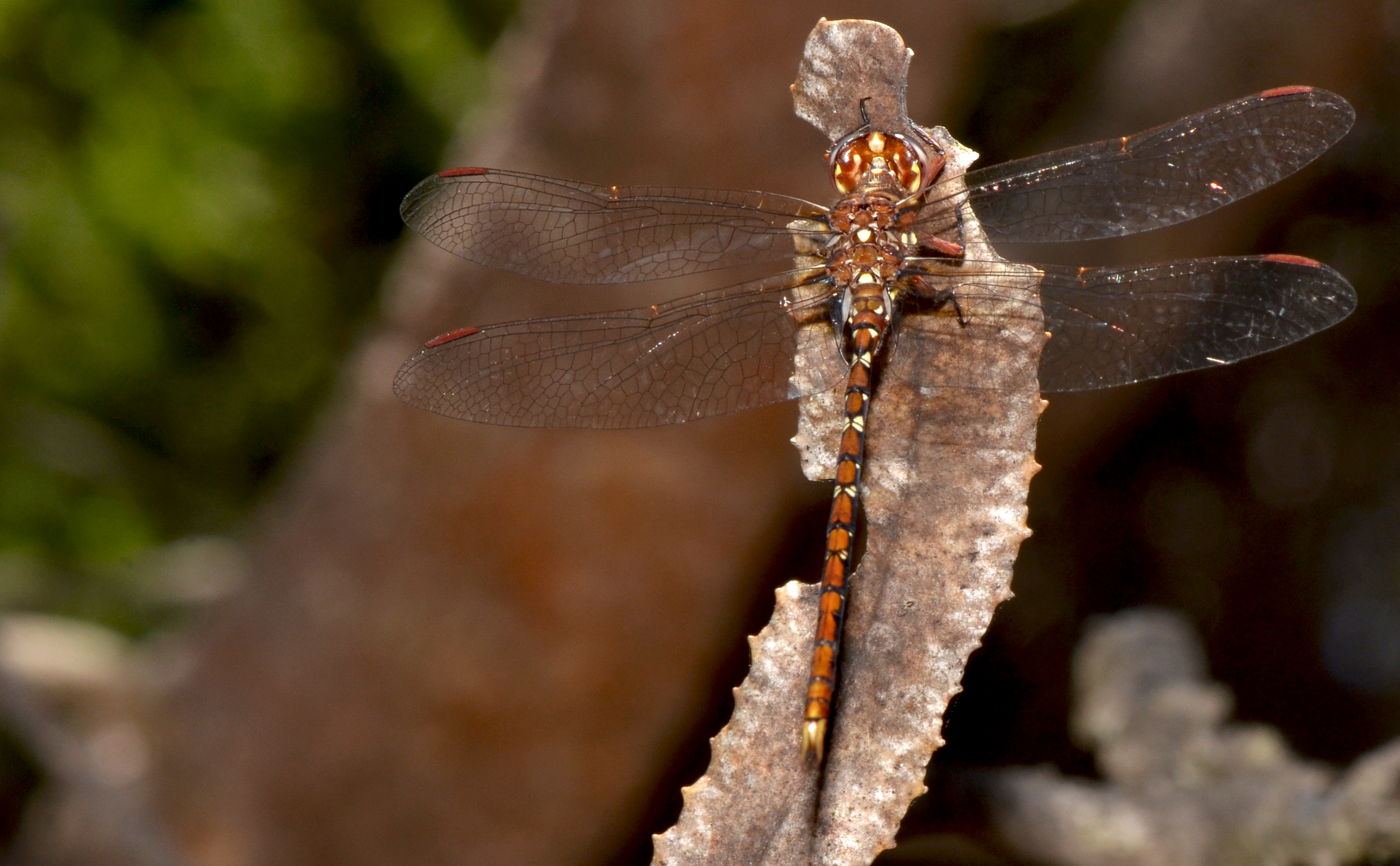
- Male

Conservation status
- Least Concern (IUCN 3.1)

Scientific classification
- Kingdom: Animalia
- Phylum: Arthropoda
- Clade: Pancrustacea
- Class: Insecta
- Order: Odonata
- Suborder: Anisoptera
- Superfamily: Libelluloidea
- Family: Synthemistidae
- Genus: Archaeosynthemis
- Species: A. occidentalis

Binomial name
- Archaeosynthemis occidentalis Tillyard, 1910

Synonyms
- Synthemis macrostigma occidentalis Tillyard, 1910

= Archaeosynthemis occidentalis =

Western brown tigertail

Species of dragonfly

Archaeosynthemis occidentalis is a species of dragonfly of the family Synthemistidae, known as the western brown tigertail. It is a medium-sized dragonfly with reddish-brown and yellow markings. It is endemic to south-western Australia where it inhabits boggy creeks and swamps.

Archaeosynthemis occidentalis appears similar to Archaeosynthemis orientalis found in eastern Australia.

== Etymology ==
The genus name Archaeosynthemis combines the Greek ἀρχαῖος (arkhaios, "ancient" or "archaic") with Synthemis, an existing genus of dragonflies.

The species name occidentalis is derived from the Latin occidens ("west" or "western"), referring to its south-western Australian habitat.

== Gallery ==
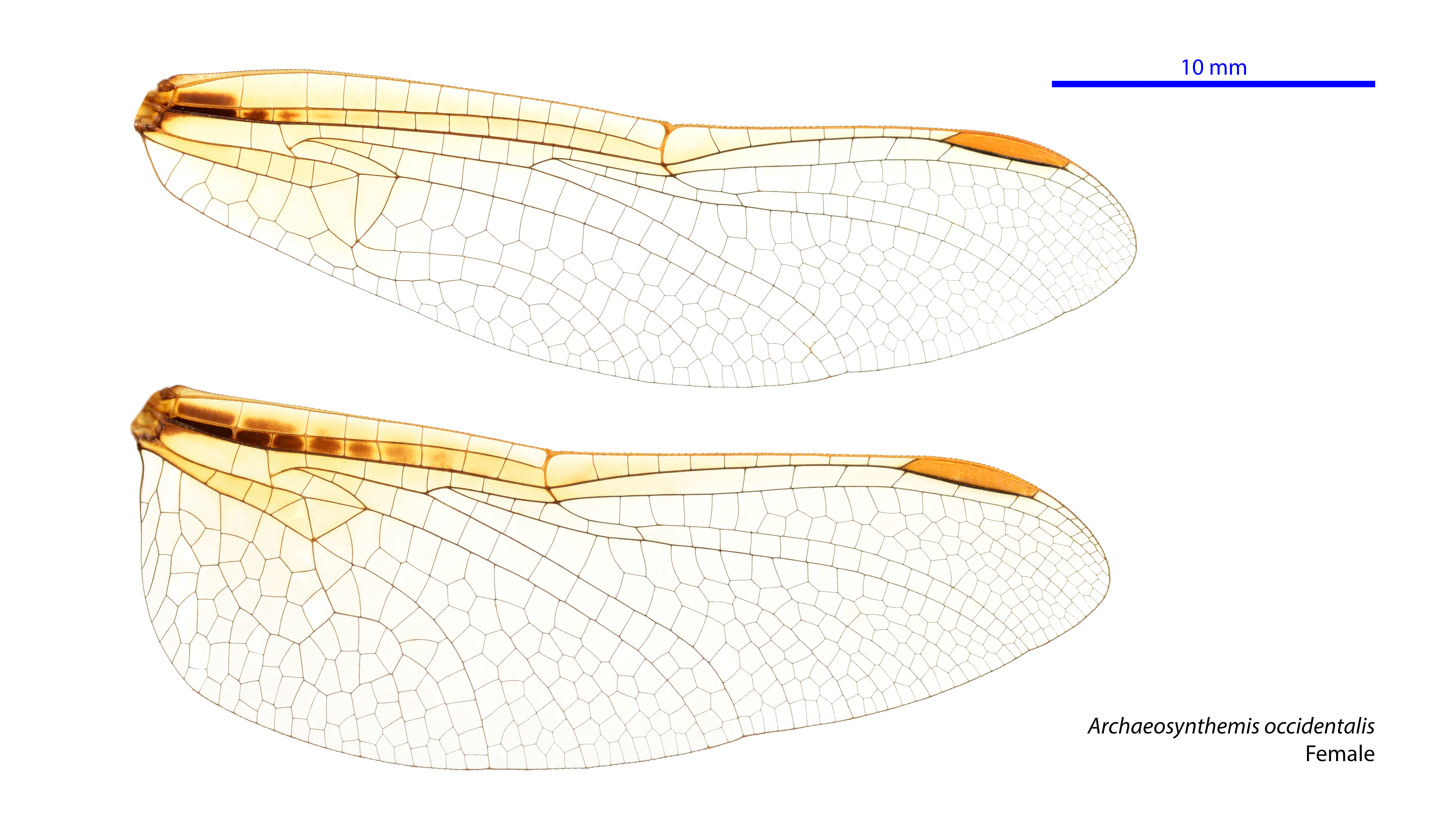
Female wings

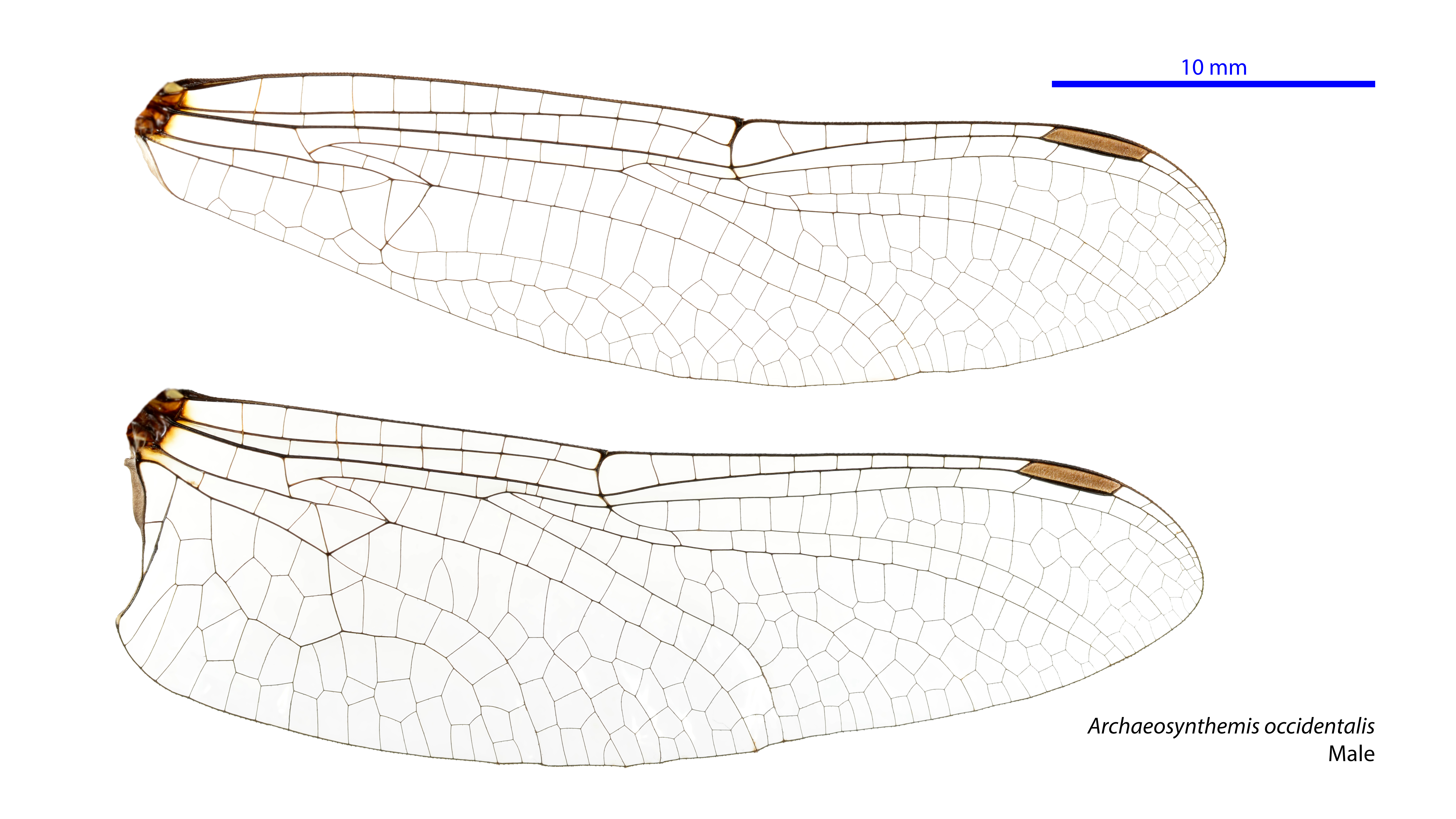
Male wings

== See also ==
- List of Odonata species of Australia
