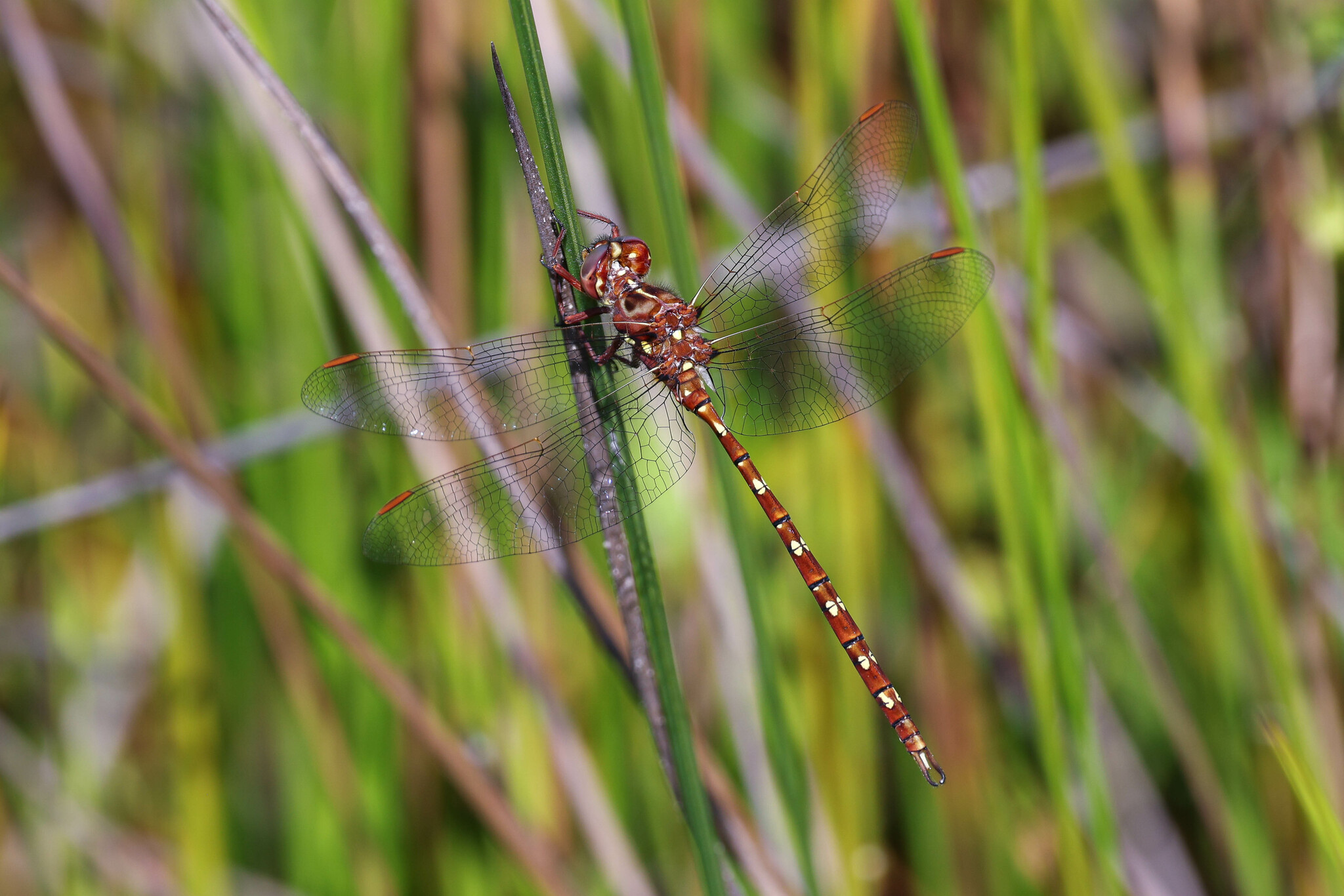
- Male in Girraween, Queensland

Conservation status
- Least Concern (IUCN 3.1)

Scientific classification
- Kingdom: Animalia
- Phylum: Arthropoda
- Clade: Pancrustacea
- Class: Insecta
- Order: Odonata
- Suborder: Anisoptera
- Superfamily: Libelluloidea
- Family: Synthemistidae
- Genus: Archaeosynthemis
- Species: A. orientalis

Binomial name
- Archaeosynthemis orientalis Tillyard, 1910

Synonyms
- Synthemis macrostigma orientalis Tillyard, 1910

= Archaeosynthemis orientalis =

Eastern brown tigertail

Species of dragonfly

Archaeosynthemis orientalis is a species of dragonfly of the family Synthemistidae, commonly known as the eastern brown tigertail. It is a medium-sized dragonfly with reddish-brown and yellow markings. It inhabits boggy creeks and swamps in eastern Australia

Archaeosynthemis orientalis appears similar to Archaeosynthemis occidentalis found in Western Australia.

== Etymology ==
The genus name Archaeosynthemis combines the Greek ἀρχαῖος (arkhaios, "ancient" or "archaic") with Synthemis, an existing genus of dragonflies.

The species name orientalis is derived from the Latin oriens ("rising" or "eastern"), referring to its eastern Australian habitat.

== Gallery ==
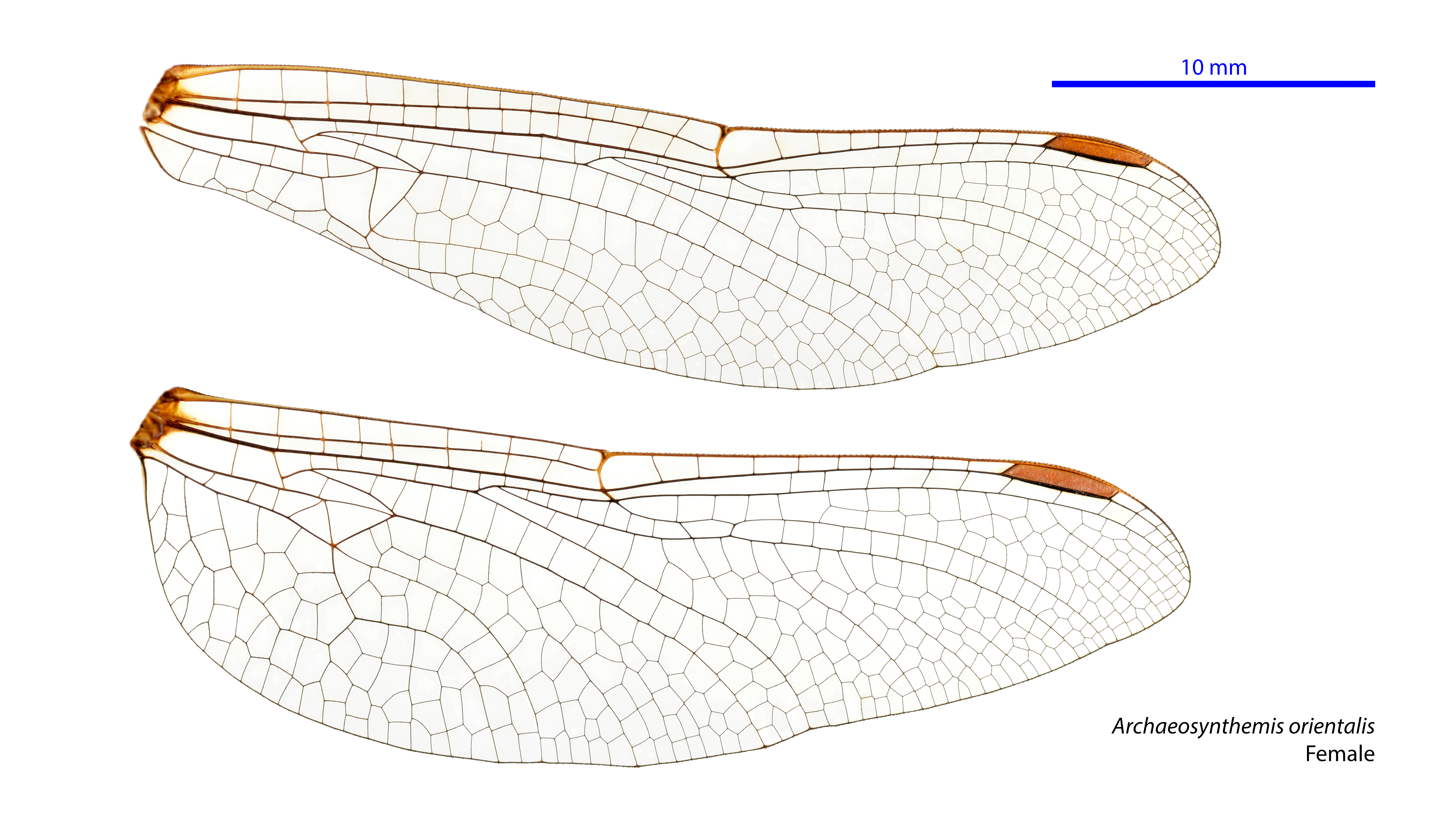
Female wings

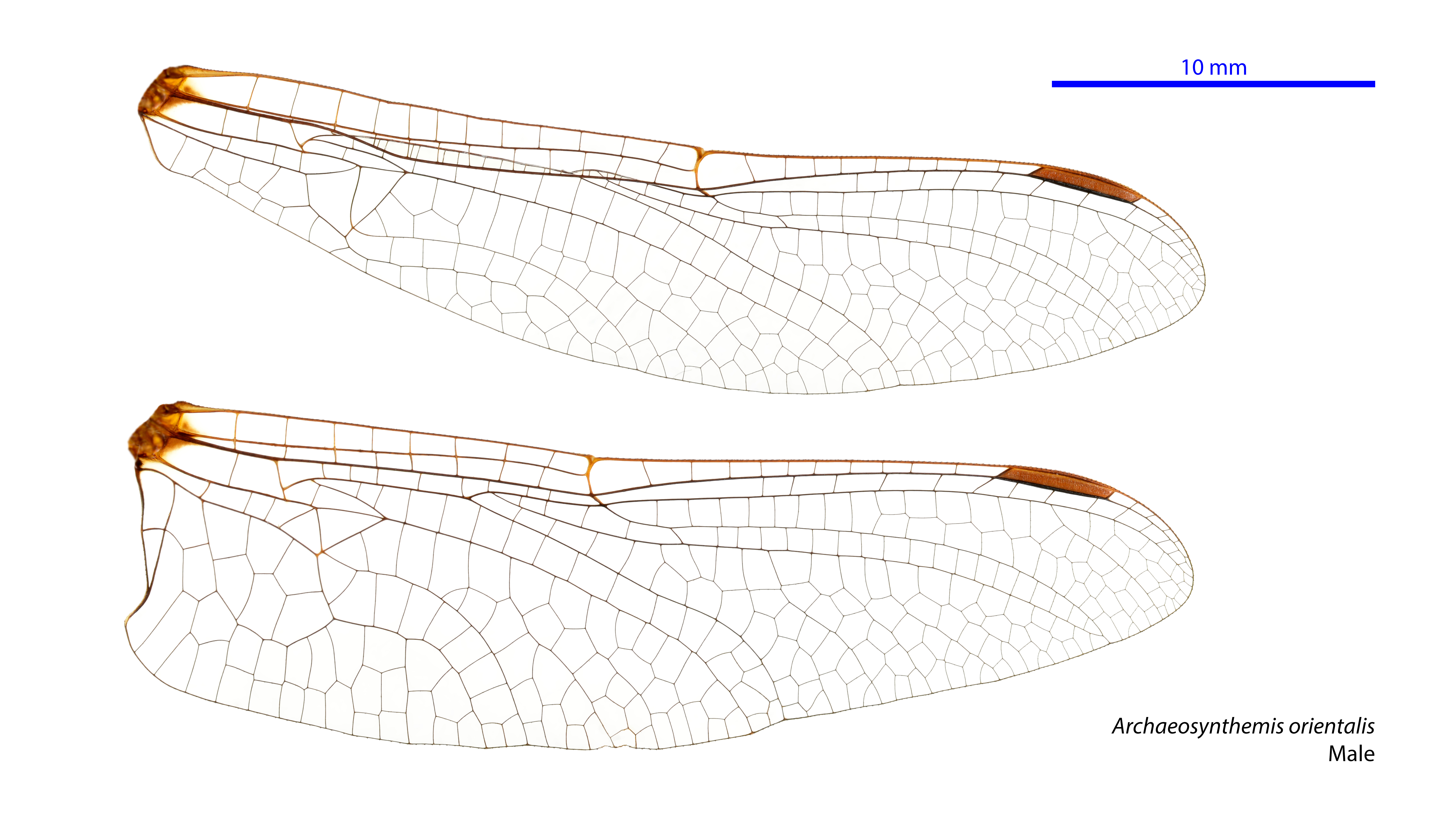
Male wings

== See also ==
- List of Odonata species of Australia
