= Onychothemis tonkinensis =

Scientific classification
- Kingdom: Animalia
- Phylum: Arthropoda
- Clade: Pancrustacea
- Class: Insecta
- Order: Odonata
- Infraorder: Anisoptera
- Family: Libellulidae
- Genus: Onychothemis
- Species: O. tonkinensis

Binomial name
- Onychothemis tonkinensis Martin, 1904

Species of dragonfly

Onychothemis tonkinensis, the aggressive riverhawk, is a species of dragonfly in the family Libellulidae. It is widespread in many Asian countries. 3 subspecies are recognized.

== Subspecies ==
- Onychothemis tonkinensis ceylanica Ris, 1912
- Onychothemis tonkinensis siamensis Fraser, 1932
- Onychothemis tonkinensis tonkinensis Martin, 1904

=== See also ===
- List of odonates of Sri Lanka
- List of odonates of India

== Sources ==
- tonkinensis.html World Dragonflies
- Animal diversity web
- Sri Lanka Biodiversity
