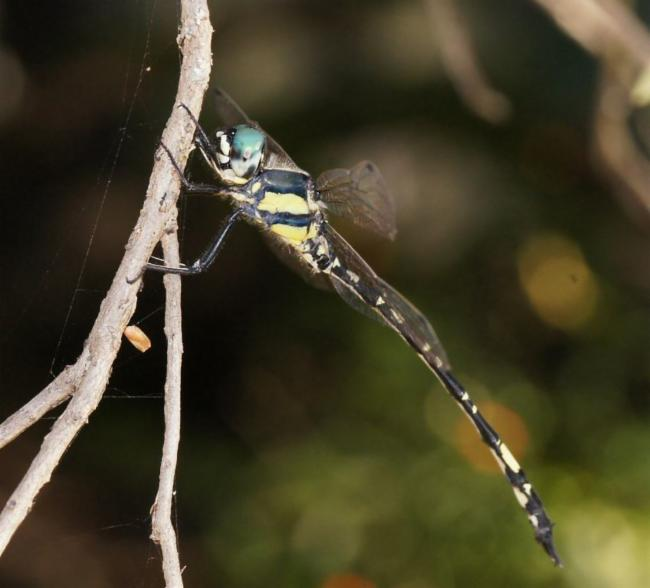
- Male Parasynthemis regina

Scientific classification
- Kingdom: Animalia
- Phylum: Arthropoda
- Clade: Pancrustacea
- Class: Insecta
- Order: Odonata
- Suborder: Anisoptera
- Superfamily: Libelluloidea
- Family: Synthemistidae
- Genus: Parasynthemis; Carle, 1995

= Parasynthemis =

Genus of dragonflies

Parasynthemis is a genus of dragonflies in the family Synthemistidae, There is only one species of this genus which is endemic to south-eastern Australia.

== Species ==
The genus Parasynthemis includes one species:

- Parasynthemis regina (Selys, 1874) - Royal tigertail

== Etymology ==
The genus name Parasynthemis combines the Greek παρά (para, "near" or "beside") with Synthemis, an existing genus of dragonflies.

== See also ==
- List of Odonata species of Australia
