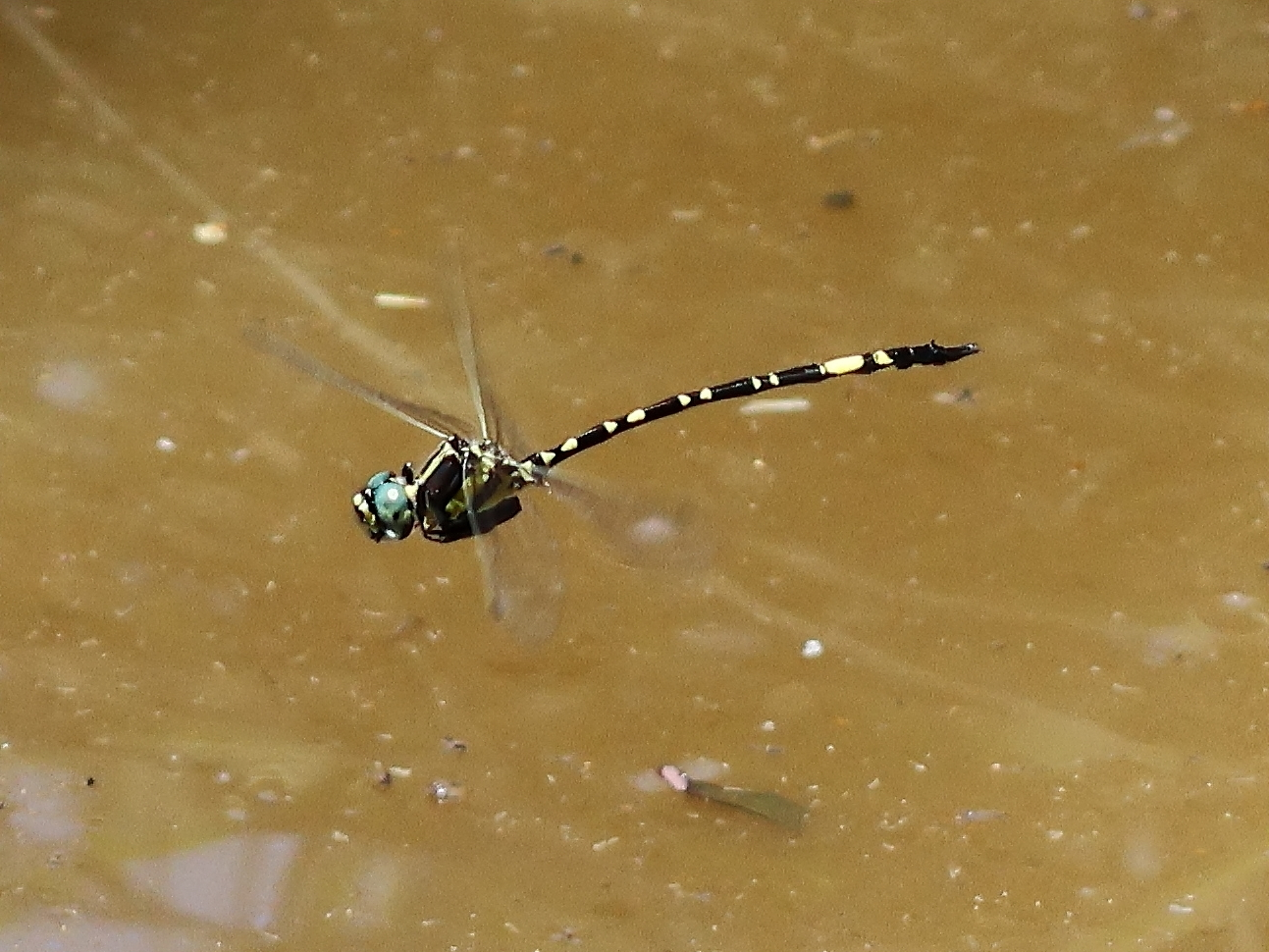
- Male, Cessnock NSW

Conservation status
- Least Concern (IUCN 3.1)

Scientific classification
- Kingdom: Animalia
- Phylum: Arthropoda
- Clade: Pancrustacea
- Class: Insecta
- Order: Odonata
- Suborder: Anisoptera
- Superfamily: Libelluloidea
- Family: Synthemistidae
- Genus: Parasynthemis; Carle, 1995
- Species: P. regina

Binomial name
- Parasynthemis regina (Selys, 1874)

Synonyms
- Synthemis regina Selys, 1874

= Parasynthemis regina =

Royal tigertail

Species of dragonfly

Parasynthemis regina is a species of dragonfly in the family Synthemistidae, known as the royal tigertail. It is a medium to large and slender dragonfly with a long body and black and yellow markings. It inhabits stagnant pools and swamps in eastern Australia

Parasynthemis regina was originally named Synthemis regina in 1874 by Edmond de Sélys Longchamps.

== Etymology ==
The genus name Parasynthemis combines the Greek παρά (para, "near" or "beside") with Synthemis, an existing genus of dragonflies.

The species name regina is Latin for "queen", probably referring to its large size and striking appearance.

== Gallery ==
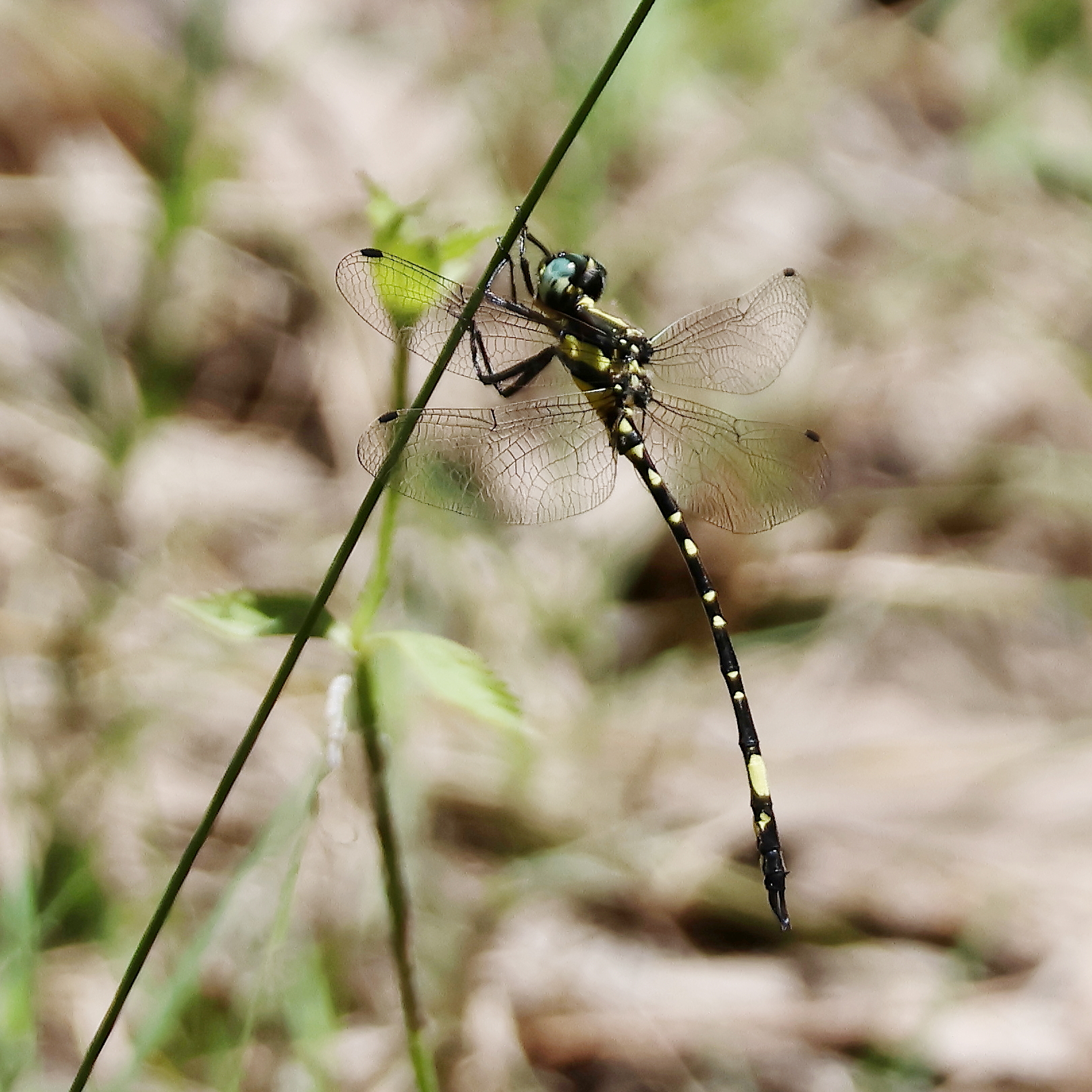
Male, Cessnock NSW

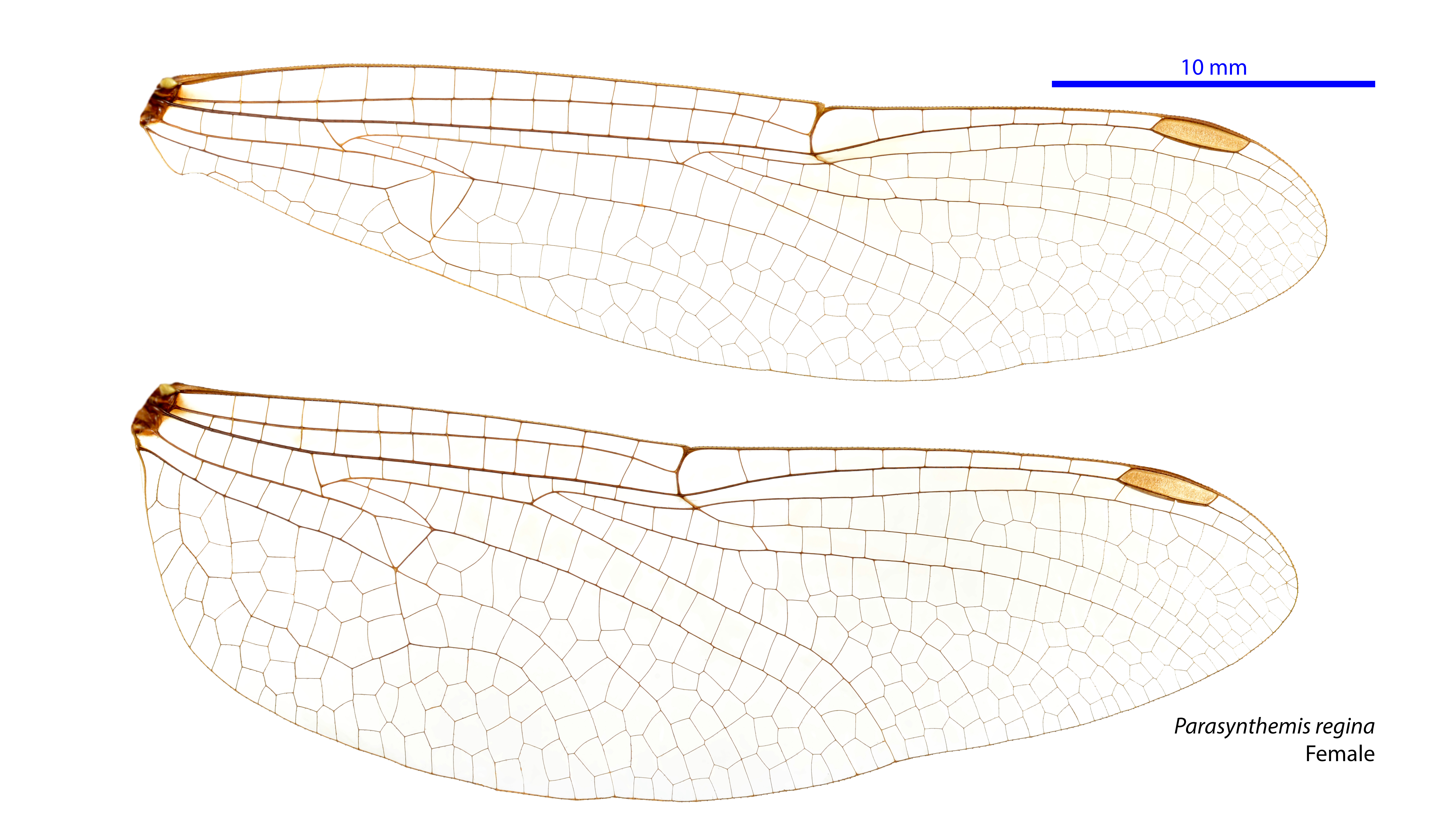
Female wings

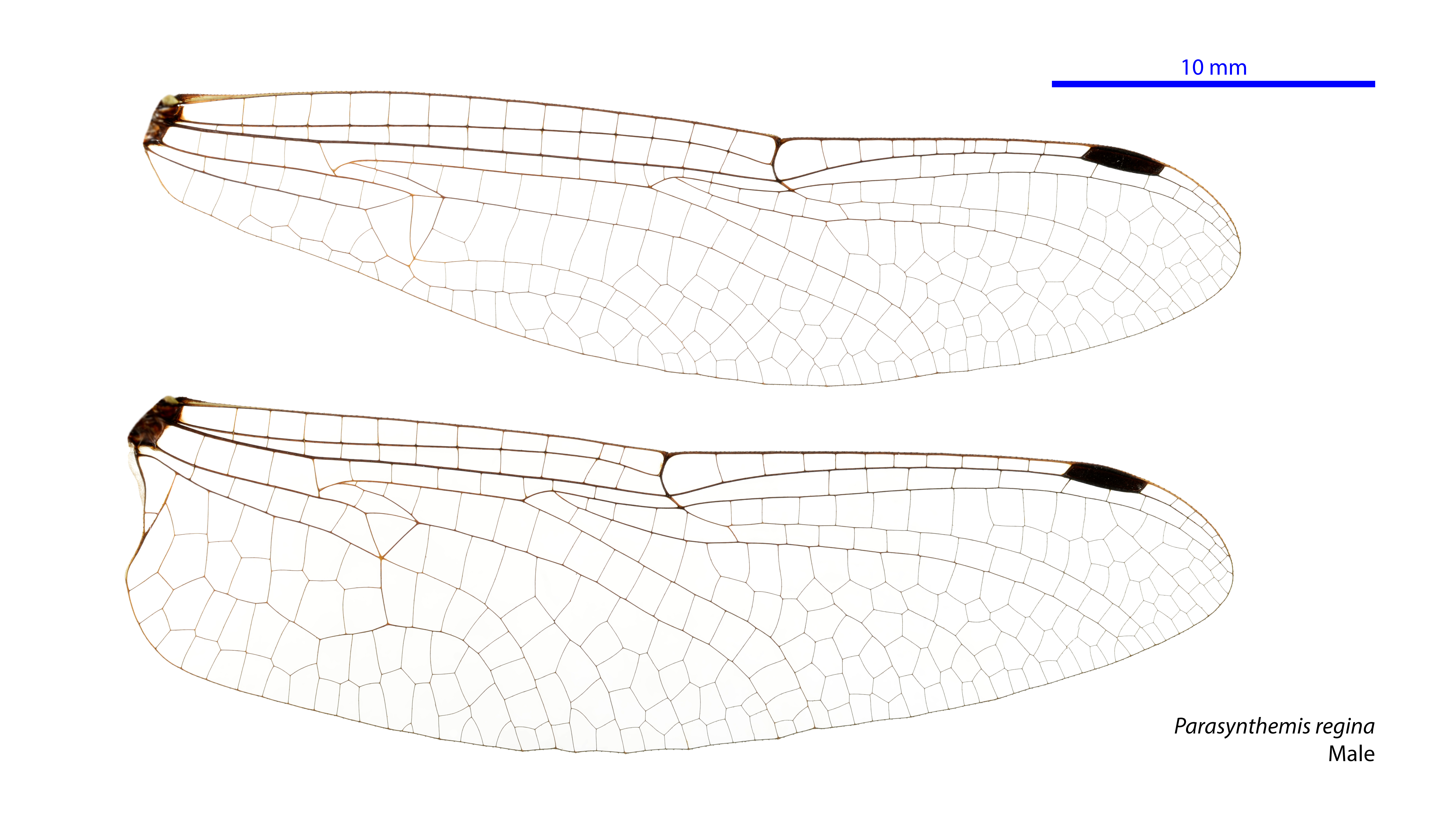
Male wings

== See also ==
- List of Odonata species of Australia
