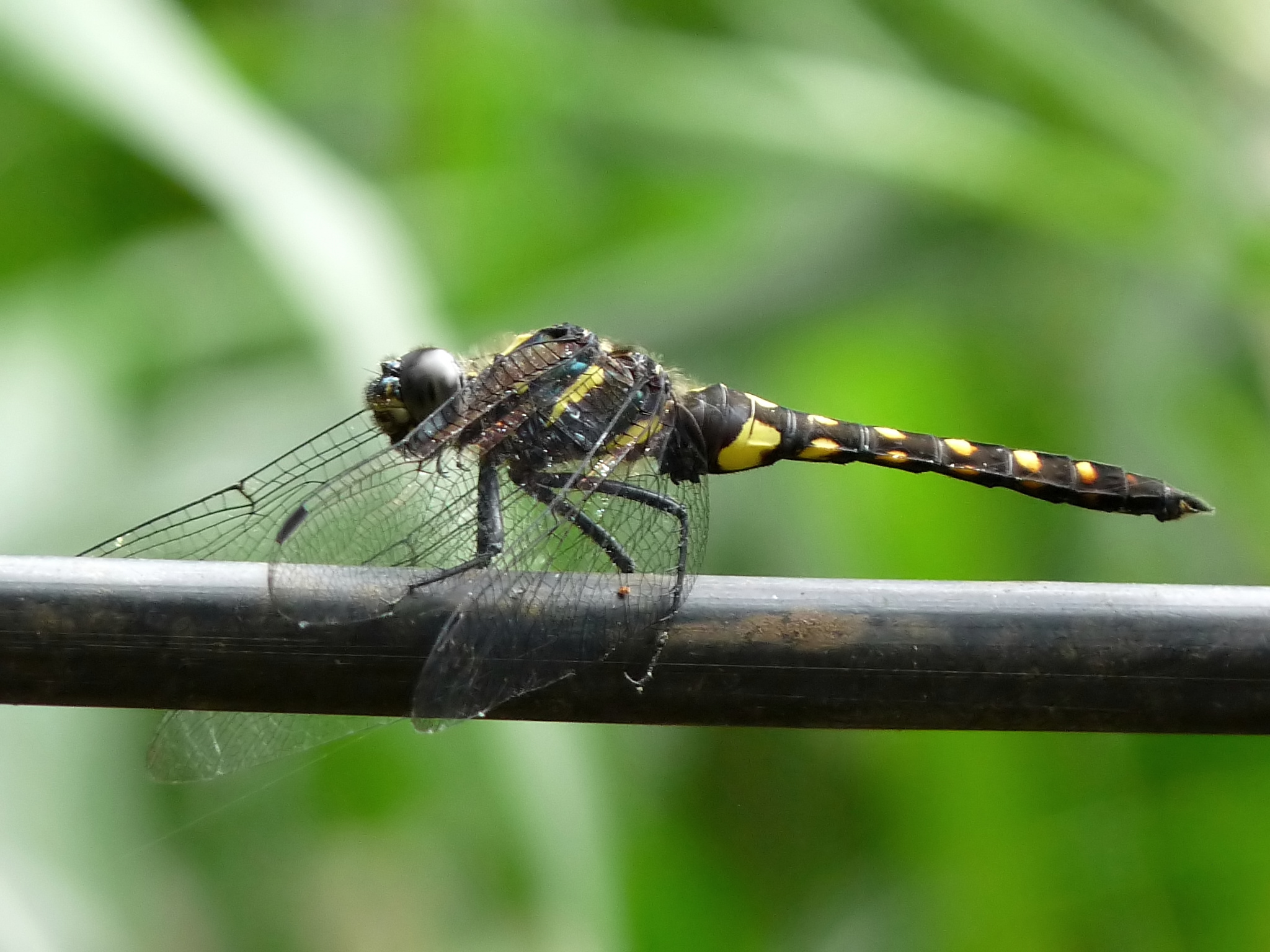
- Onychothemis testacea

Scientific classification
- Kingdom: Animalia
- Phylum: Arthropoda
- Class: Insecta
- Order: Odonata
- Infraorder: Anisoptera
- Superfamily: Libelluloidea
- Family: Libellulidae
- Genus: Onychothemis; Brauer, 1868

= Onychothemis =

Genus of dragonflies

Onychothemis is a genus of dragonflies in the family Libellulidae, erected by Friedrich Moritz Brauer in 1868. Species have been recorded from India, China, Indochina and western Malesia.

== Species ==
The Global Biodiversity Information Facility lists:

1. Onychothemis abnormis Brauer, 1868
2. Onychothemis celebensis Ris, 1912
3. Onychothemis coccinea Lieftinck, 1953
4. Onychothemis culminicola Förster, 1904
5. Onychothemis rihai Prokop, 2003
6. Onychothemis testacea Laidlaw, 1902
7. Onychothemis tonkinensis Martin, 1904
8. Onychothemis yvonneae Villanueva & Van Beijnen, 2022
