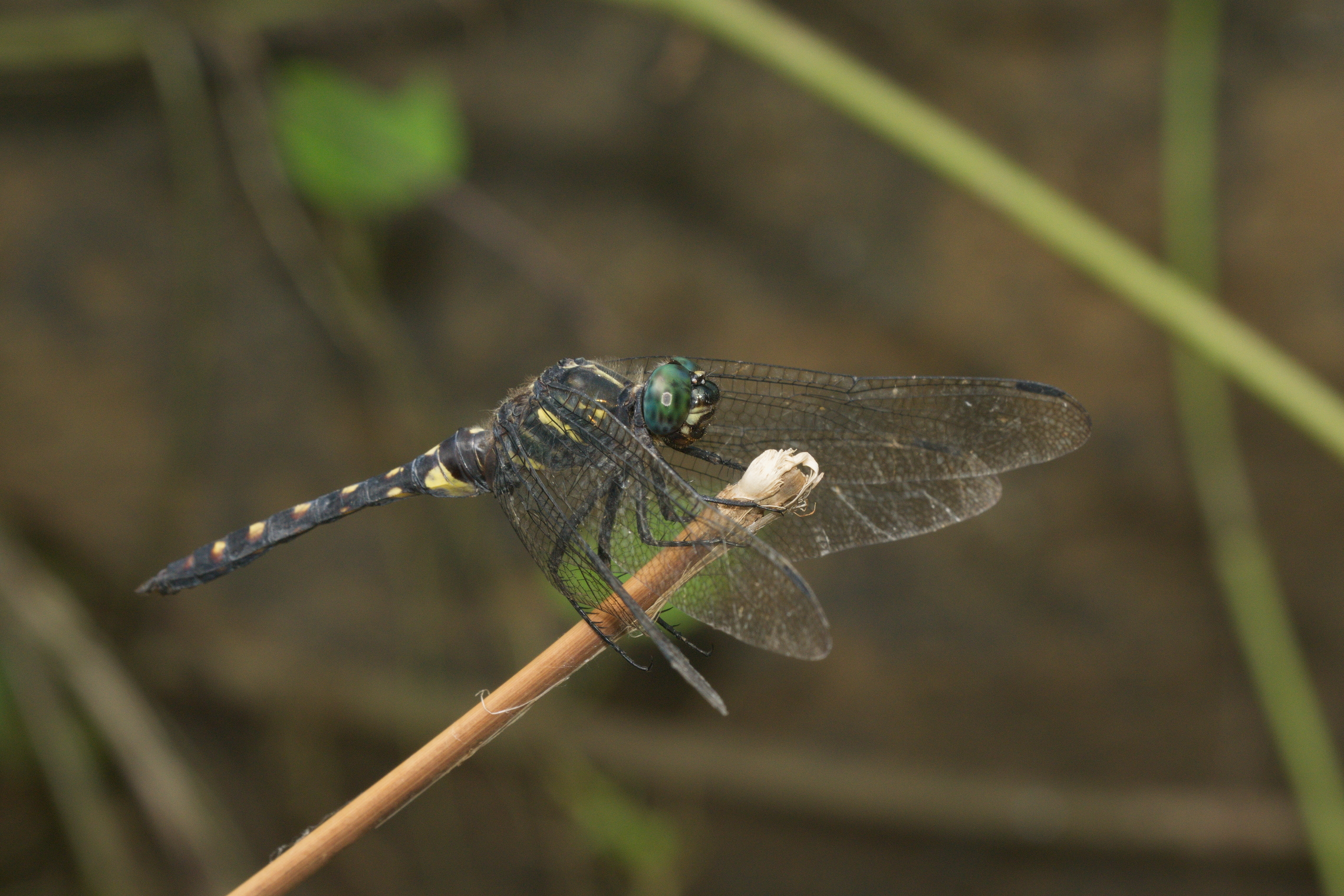
- Male

Conservation status
- Least Concern (IUCN 3.1)

Scientific classification
- Kingdom: Animalia
- Phylum: Arthropoda
- Class: Insecta
- Order: Odonata
- Infraorder: Anisoptera
- Family: Libellulidae
- Genus: Onychothemis
- Species: O. testacea

Binomial name
- Onychothemis testacea Laidlaw, 1902

= Onychothemis testacea =

Species of dragonfly

Onychothemis testacea, the stellate river hawk, or riverhawker, is a species of dragonfly in the family Libellulidae. It is widespread in many Asian countries.

== Description ==
It is a medium sized dragonfly with bottle-green eyes. Its thorax is dark metallic-blue, marked with citron-yellow. There is a narrow mid-dorsal carina, a humeral spot and a narrow stripe on mesepimeron. Abdomen is black, marked with citron-yellow. Segment 1 has a triangular spot on mid-dorsum. Segment 2 has a small diamond-shaped spot on mid-dorsum. Segment 3 has its base dorsally and sub-dorsally narrow yellow and a stellate spot on mid-dorsum. Segments 4 to 9 are similar to 3; but the lateral spots much smaller. Segment 10 is entirely black. Anal appendages are black. Female is similar to the male.

== Habitat ==
It breeds in streams in forest or at its margins. This is a very fast flying dragonfly of forested streams. Males usually perch on dry twigs and other similar vantage points over streams and aggressively chase other dragonflies entering their territory.

== See also ==
- List of odonates of Sri Lanka
- List of odonates of India
- List of odonata of Kerala
