= Rhinocyphinae =

Scientific classification
- Kingdom: Animalia
- Phylum: Arthropoda
- Clade: Pancrustacea
- Class: Insecta
- Order: Odonata
- Suborder: Zygoptera
- Family: Chlorocyphidae
- Subfamily: Rhinocyphinae; Bechly, 1996

Genera
- Aristocypha; Calocypha; Ebenocypha; Heliocypha; Heterocypha; Rhinocypha; Scapanocypha; Sundacypha

Subfamily of damselflies

Rhinocyphinae is a subfamily of jewel damselflies in the family Chlorocyphidae. World Odonata List includes eight genera in the subfamily.

== Taxonomic history ==
In 2014, Dijkstra and colleagues discussed two groups of genera that had been placed in Rhinocyphinae, but their analyses did not support the groups forming one larger group. They noted that the classification needed revision. In 2026, Fomekong-Lontchi and colleagues included Rhinocyphinae as one of six subfamilies in their revised classification of Chlorocyphidae. They noted that relationships within the subfamily need further study.
