= Chlorocyphinae =

Scientific classification
- Kingdom: Animalia
- Phylum: Arthropoda
- Clade: Pancrustacea
- Class: Insecta
- Order: Odonata
- Suborder: Zygoptera
- Family: Chlorocyphidae
- Subfamily: Chlorocyphinae; Cowley, 1937

Genera
- Africocypha; Chlorocypha; Platycypha; Stenocypha

Subfamily of damselflies

Chlorocyphinae is a subfamily of jewel damselflies in the family Chlorocyphidae. World Odonata List places four genera in the subfamily; they are found in tropical Africa.

== Taxonomic history ==
In 2014, Dijkstra and colleagues described four African genera as a distinct group and referred to it as "Chlorocyphinae". They did not formally apply subfamily names at the time because of a nomenclatural issue involving older names for other groups in Chlorocyphidae. In 2026, Fomekong-Lontchi and colleagues included Chlorocyphinae, attributed to Cowley in 1937, as a subfamily in their revised classification of Chlorocyphidae.
