= M. potens =

M. potens may refer to:

- Metriorhynchus potens, an extinct Late Jurassic metriorhynchid crocodile species
- Myolepta potens, a hoverfly species

== See also ==
- Potens (disambiguation)
