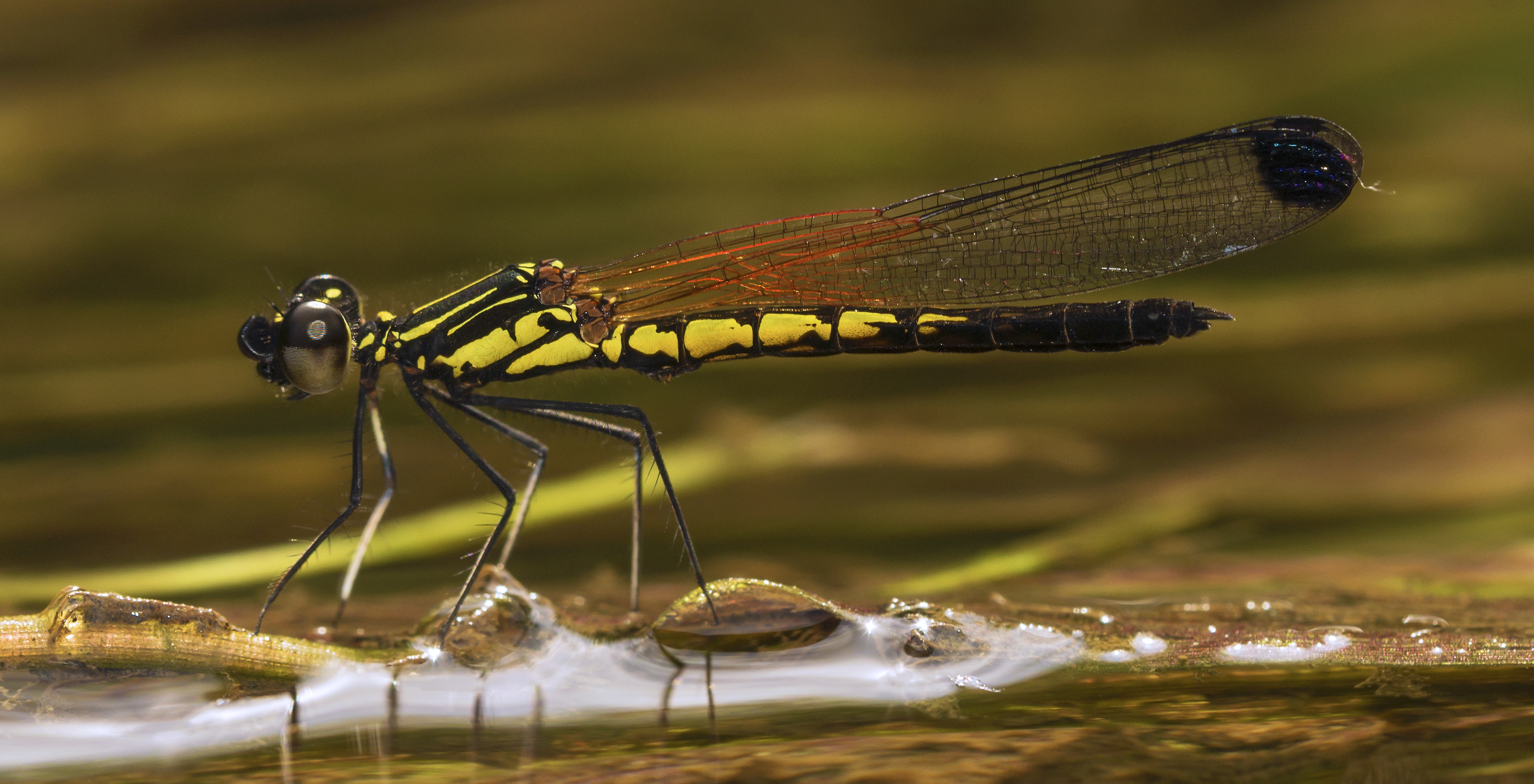
- Male
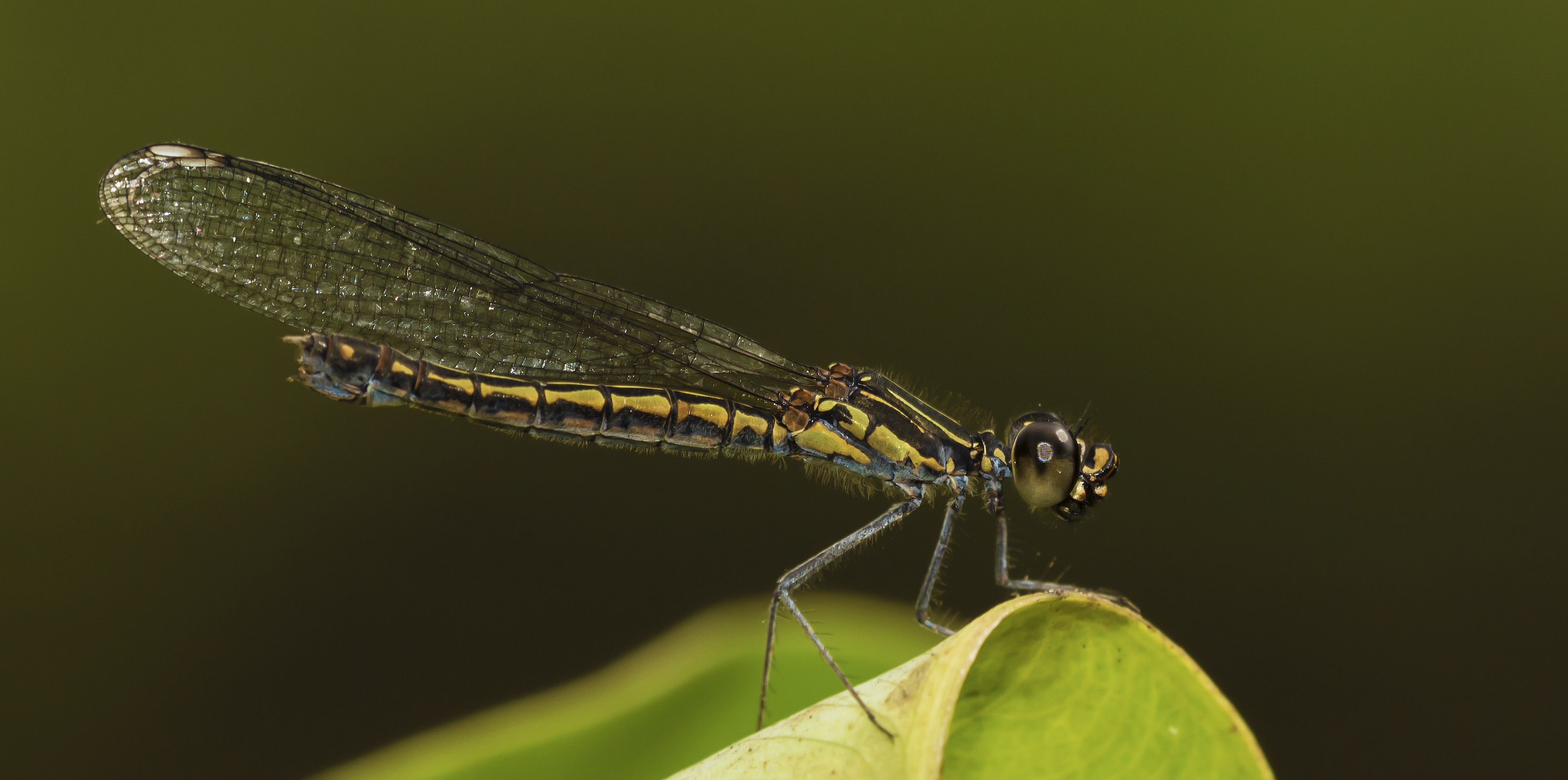
- Female

Scientific classification
- Kingdom: Animalia
- Phylum: Arthropoda
- Class: Insecta
- Order: Odonata
- Suborder: Zygoptera
- Family: Chlorocyphidae
- Genus: Libellago
- Species: L. indica

Binomial name
- Libellago indica (Fraser, 1928)

Synonyms
- Micromerus lineatus indica Fraser, 1928; Libellago lineata indica Fraser, 1934

= Libellago indica =

Species of damselfly

Libellago indica, the southern heliodor, is a species of damselfly in the family Chlorocyphidae. It is found only in South India. It breeds in hill streams and rivers.

Fraser described this damselfly in 1928 as a subspecies of Libellago lineata. Most authors have followed Fraser's original view for a long time, although Lieftinck considered L. indica as a good species (Lieftinck, 1940, p. 88; 1955, p. 68; 1971, p. 206). Recently De Fonseka 2000, Hämäläinen 2002 and World Odonata List listed L. indica as a good species.

== Description and habitat ==
It is a small damselfly with large head and brown capped yellowish eyes. Its thorax is black with yellow marks. Wings are transparent with apical black spots on the fore-wings. The abdomen is black with large yellow spots on lateral sides on segments 2 to 7. Segments 2 to 5 have broad mid-dorsal black stripes which is absent in L. lineata lineata. These abdominal markings will help to easily distinguish it from other Libellago lineata. Female is dull brown and with transparent wings. Sub-adult males have also transparent wings.

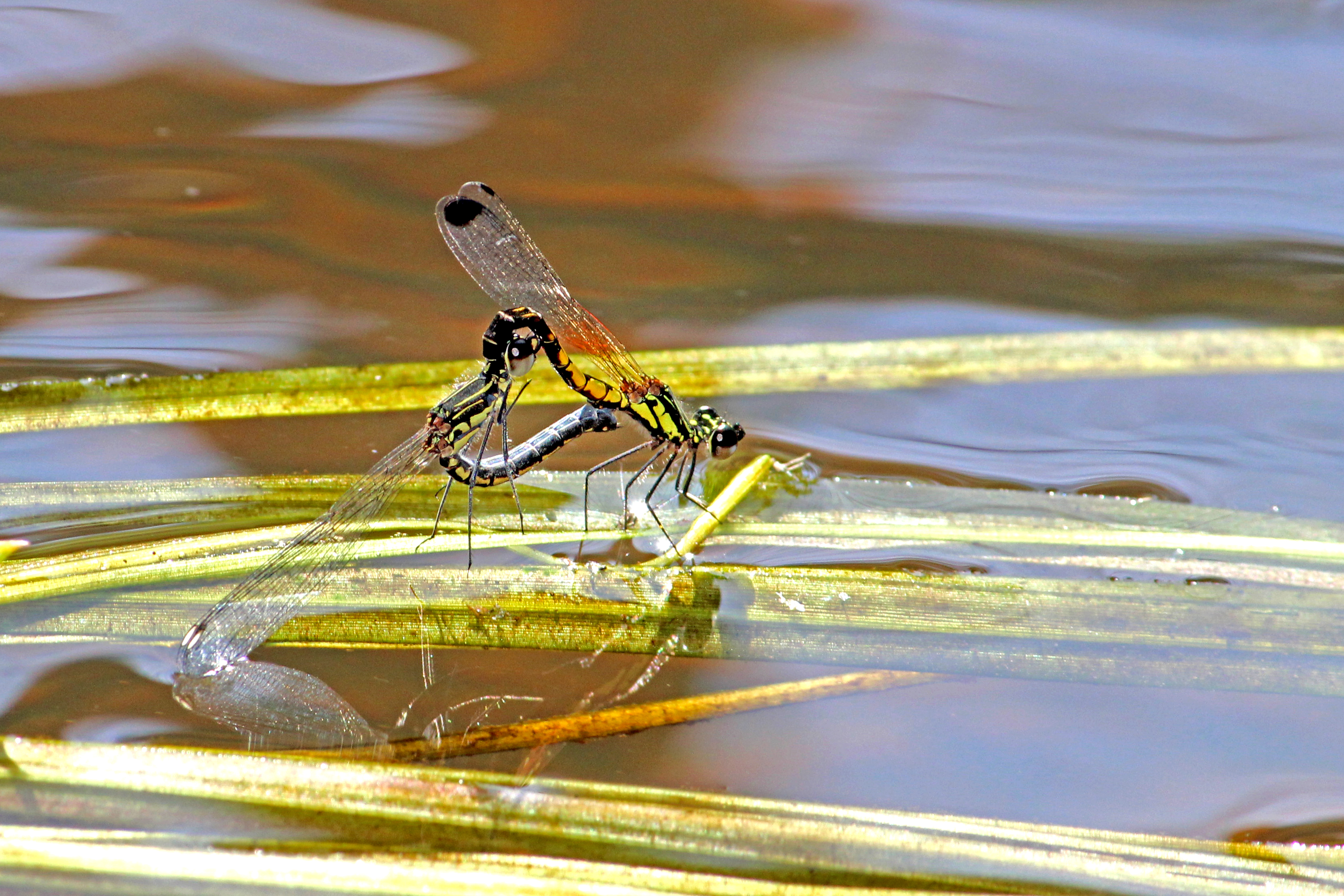
Mating

It is common on the banks of rivers and streams flowing through the forests. Frequently found sitting in emergent water plants and overhanging bushes. It breeds in hill streams and rivers.

== See also ==
- List of odonates of India
- List of odonata of Kerala
