= Sclerocypha =

Scientific classification
- Domain: Eukaryota
- Kingdom: Animalia
- Phylum: Arthropoda
- Class: Insecta
- Order: Odonata
- Suborder: Zygoptera
- Family: Chlorocyphidae
- Genus: Sclerocypha; Fraser, 1949
- Species: S. bisignata

Binomial name
- Sclerocypha bisignata (McLachlan, 1870)

Genus of damselflies

Sclerocypha is a genus of jewel damselfly in the family Chlorocyphidae. There is one described species in Sclerocypha, S. bisignata.
