= Africocypha centripunctata =

Conservation status
- Endangered (IUCN 3.1)

Scientific classification
- Kingdom: Animalia
- Phylum: Arthropoda
- Clade: Pancrustacea
- Class: Insecta
- Order: Odonata
- Suborder: Zygoptera
- Family: Chlorocyphidae
- Genus: Africocypha
- Species: A. centripunctata

Binomial name
- Africocypha centripunctata (Gambles, 1975)

Synonyms
- Chlorocypha centripunctata Gambles, 1975

Species of insect

Africocypha centripunctata, the banded jewel, is a species of damselfly known for their multi-color abdomens ranging from blue to yellow and red. They inhabit the streams of Nigeria's Obudu mountains, which has been exposed to deforestation, consequently leading to the endangerment status of the A. centripunctata species along with others of the same family.

== Anatomy and morphology ==
The abdomen color combinations vary from blue-white, yellow-orange, and bright red. Its family, Chlorocyphidae, are considered unique for their expanded eyes and clypeus in its adult stages, as well as its short abdomen, the larva's spiky paraprocts and reduced epiproct.

== Behavior ==
Current knowledge on chlorocyphid displays during threat and courtship involve aggressive flight patterns. Males fly parallel to each other when in a dispute. Males will also seize females in attempt to mate with them as they lay eggs.

== Geographic distribution and habitat ==
Africocypha centripunctata along with other damselflies have been found in the Obudu Plateau region of Cross River State Nigeria. Sightings of A. centripunctata have been made in Cameroon in 2008 and Nigeria as of 2024. Its habitat requires bodies of water, and for that reason they are mainly found in wetlands, rainforest streams and tropical forests. Logging and wood harvesting for agriculture expansion have been potential threats that have led to their ecosystem degradation, therefore they have been listed as endangered as of 2017.

== Conservation ==
In April of 2024, the Rufford Foundation presented a final evaluation report for the Ecological Survey of the Threatened and Relict Damselflies on the Obudu Plateau, Nigeria. The project was able to improve the awareness of odanates in Nigeria, confirm identity of the A. centipunctata larva and observe barbed wire fencing protecting landscapes that were initially open to human foot traffic.
