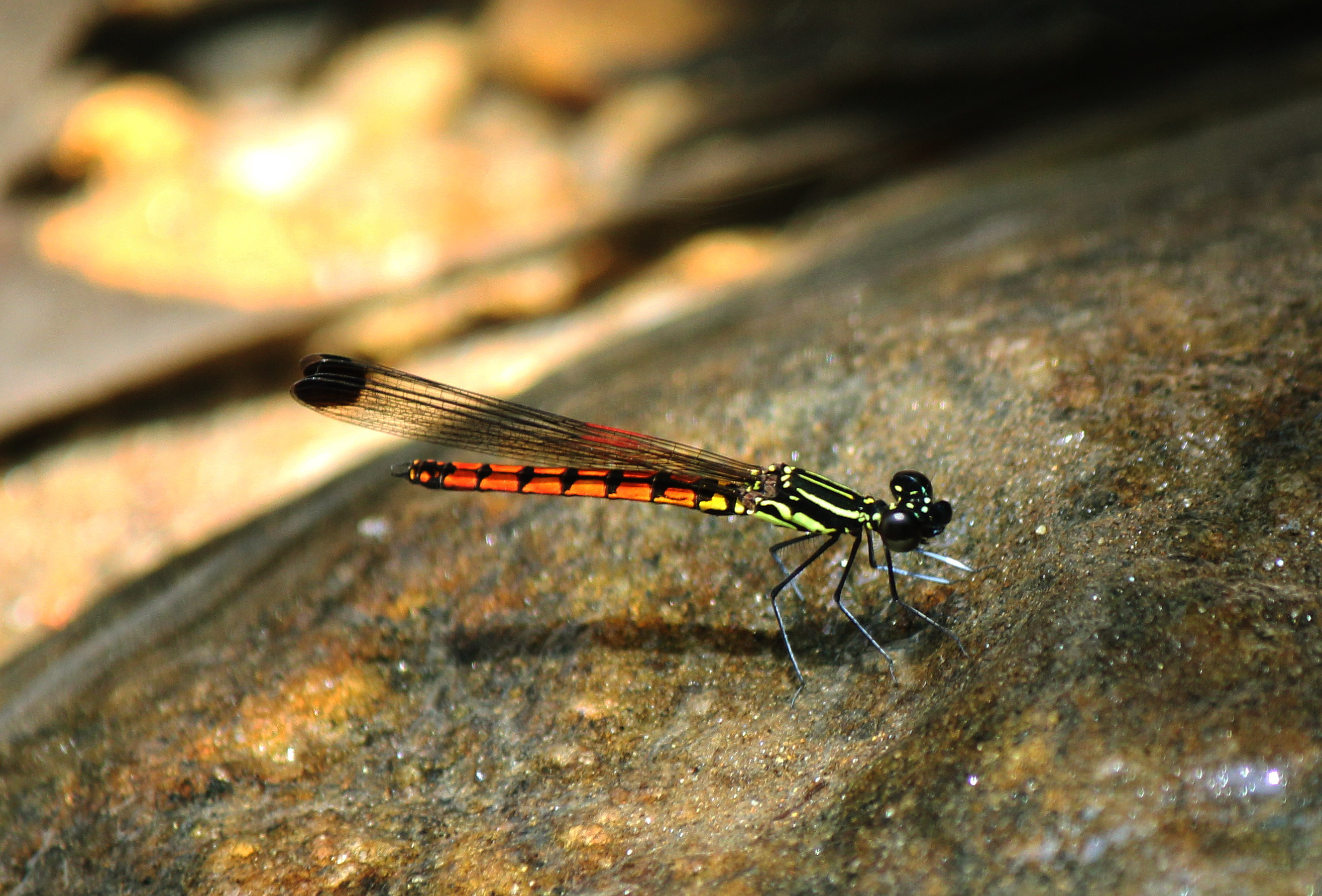

Scientific classification
- Kingdom: Animalia
- Phylum: Arthropoda
- Class: Insecta
- Order: Odonata
- Suborder: Zygoptera
- Family: Chlorocyphidae
- Genus: Libellago
- Species: L. greeni

Binomial name
- Libellago greeni (Laidlaw, 1924)

= Libellago greeni =

Green's gem

Species of damselfly

Libellago greeni (Green's gem) is a species of damselfly in the family Chlorocyphidae. It is endemic to Sri Lanka.

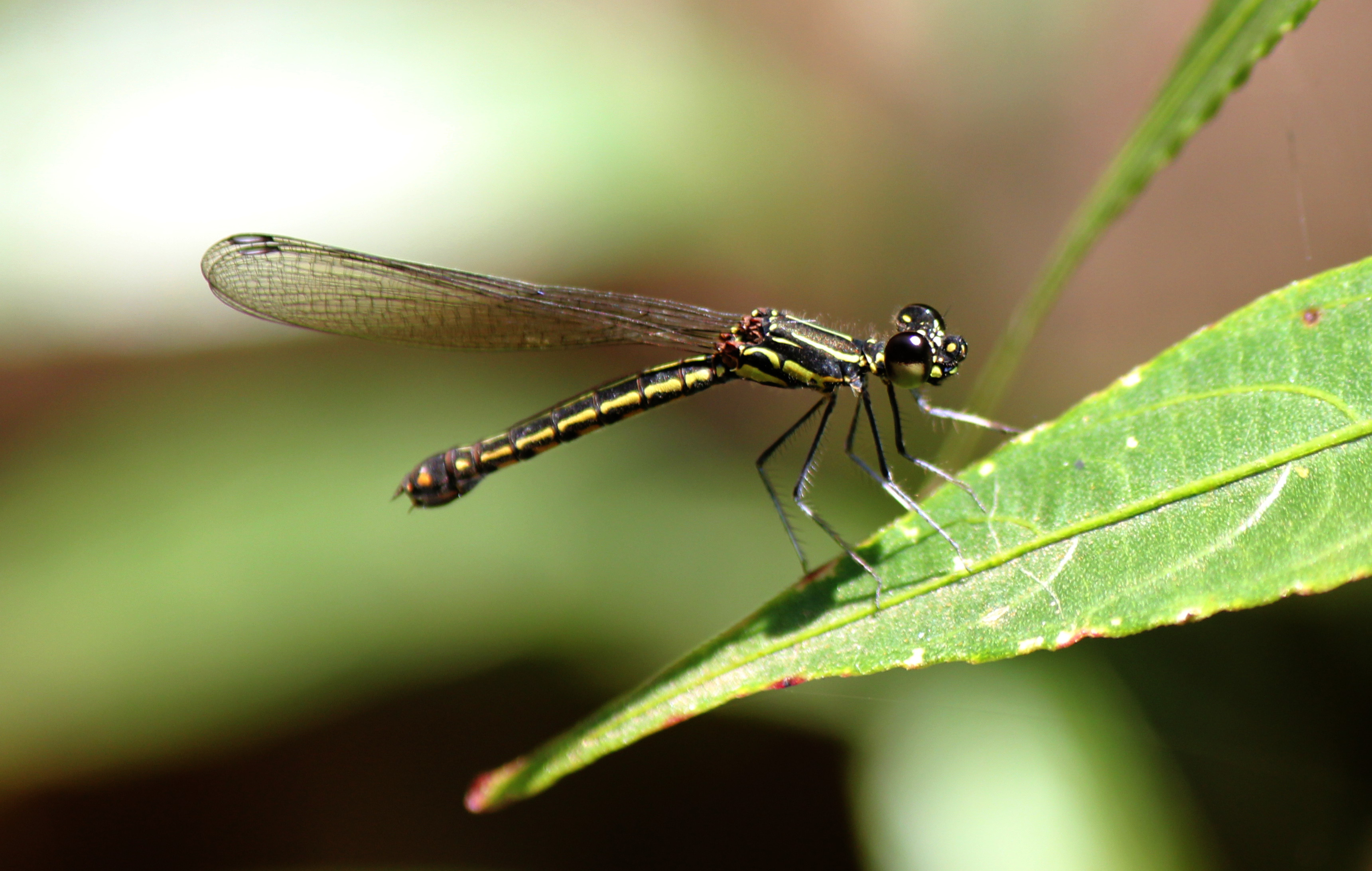
Female
