= P. potens =

P. potens may refer to:

- Psalodon potens, an extinct mammal species
- Purranisaurus potens, an extinct Late Jurassic metriorhynchid crocodile species

== See also ==
- Potens (disambiguation)
