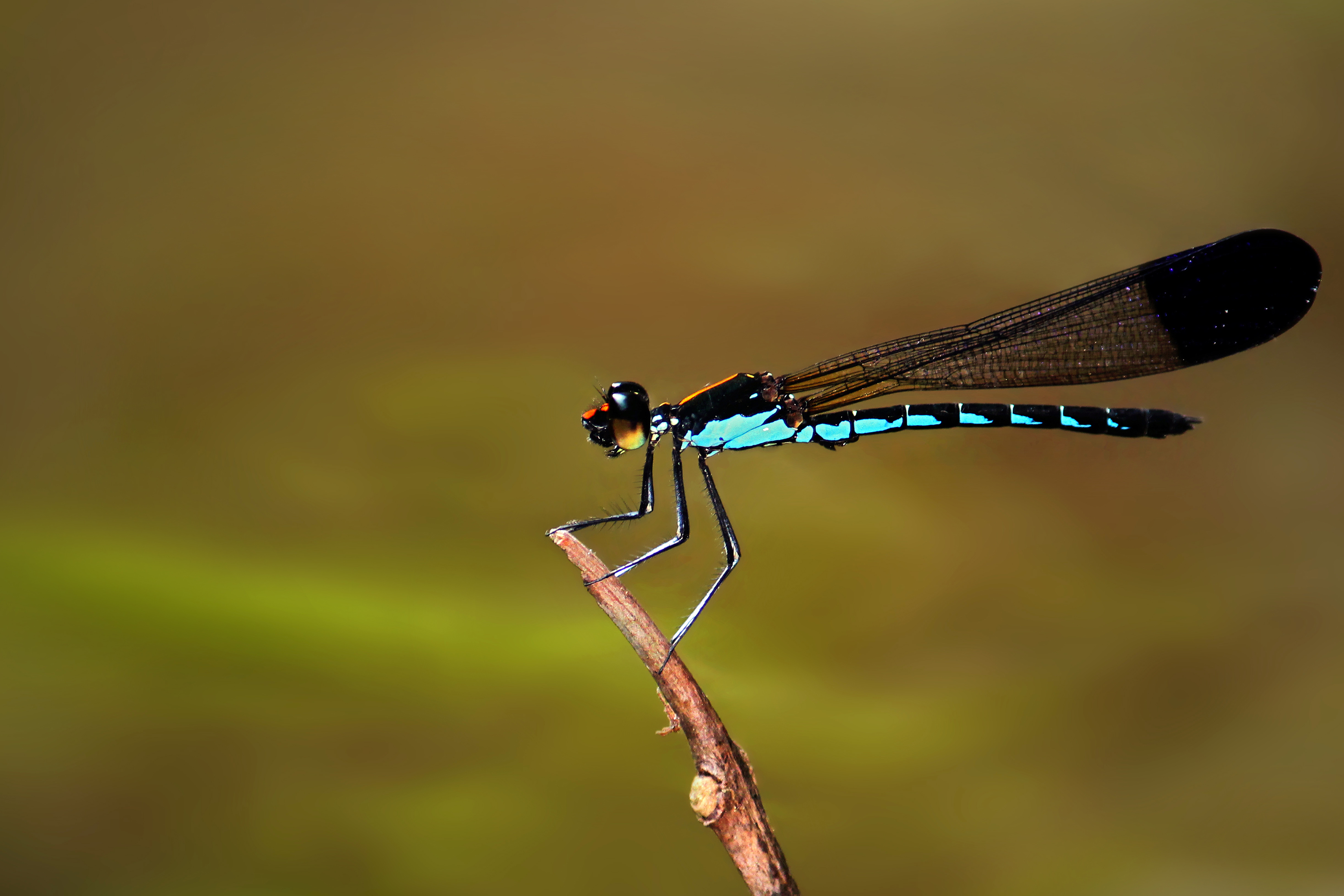
- Male
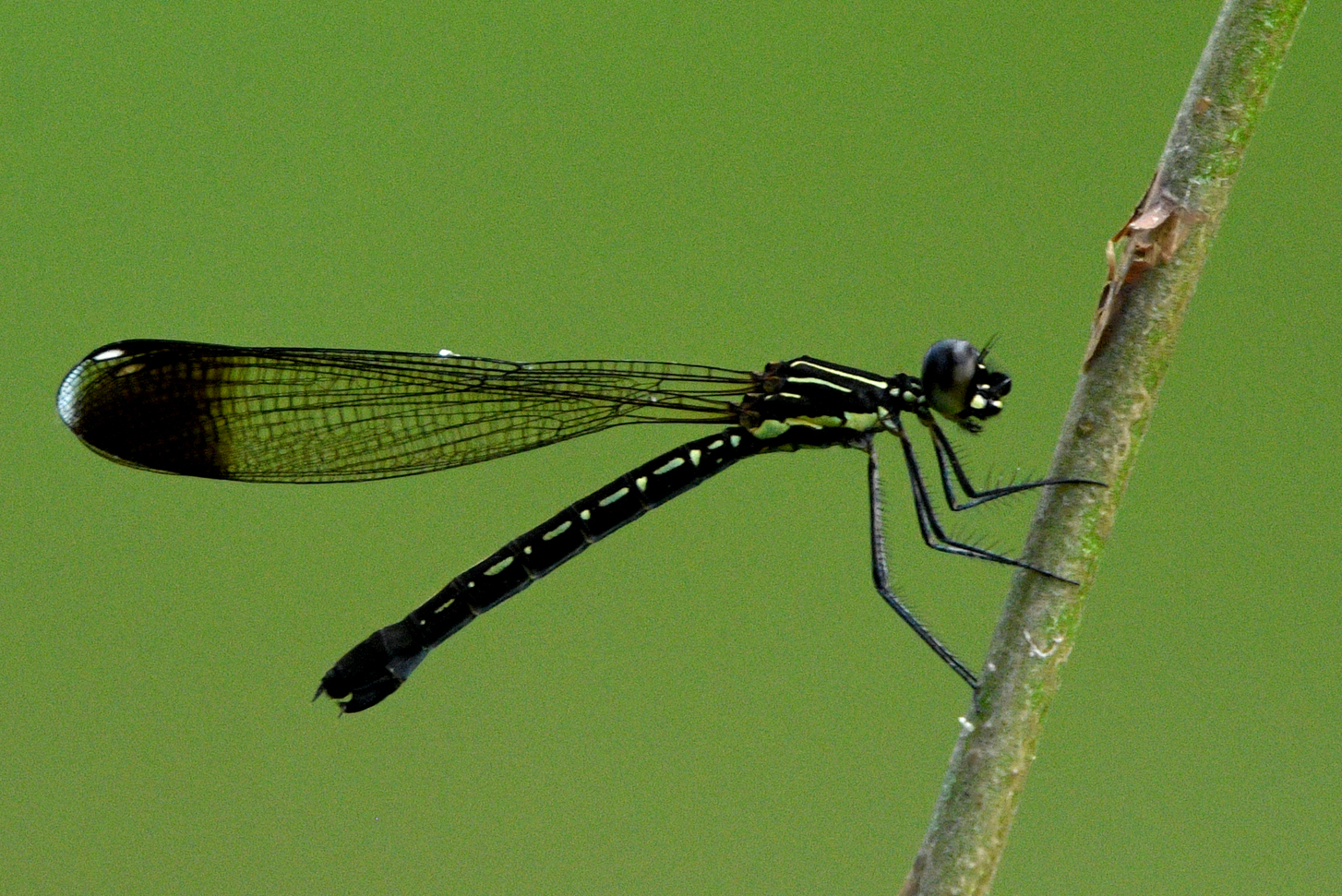
- Female

Conservation status
- Data Deficient (IUCN 3.1)

Scientific classification
- Kingdom: Animalia
- Phylum: Arthropoda
- Clade: Pancrustacea
- Class: Insecta
- Order: Odonata
- Suborder: Zygoptera
- Family: Chlorocyphidae
- Genus: Calocypha
- Species: C. laidlawi

Binomial name
- Calocypha laidlawi (Fraser, 1924)

Synonyms
- Rhinocypha laidlawi Fraser, 1924

= Calocypha laidlawi =

Species of damselfly

Calocypha laidlawi, or myristica sapphire, is a rare species of damselfly belonging to the family Chlorocyphidae. It is found only from Karnataka and Kerala in South India.

== Description and habitat ==
It is a small damselfly with big eyes and several vermilion spots on the head. Its thorax is dark with a narrow vermilion mark on dorsum and pale yellow marks on the lower part of lateral sides. The apical third of each wing is black with dark violet-metallic reflections. Its abdomen is black, marked with bright azure blue on segments 1 to 8.

Female is black with yellow markings on the face, thorax and abdomen. Abdomen is black, marked with yellow mid-lateral stripes and dots in segments 2 to 7. Fore-wings are transparent. Apices of the hind-wings are broadly brown. Pterostigma are with inner half black and outer half white.

It breeds in forest streams and rivers flowing through the myristica swamps. It is commonly found perched on half-submerged logs in mid-stream or resting on twigs overhanging the river. It is a shade-lover; found perched on partially submerged logs in mid-stream or resting on overhanging twigs in the river.

== See also ==
- List of odonates of India
- List of odonata of Kerala
