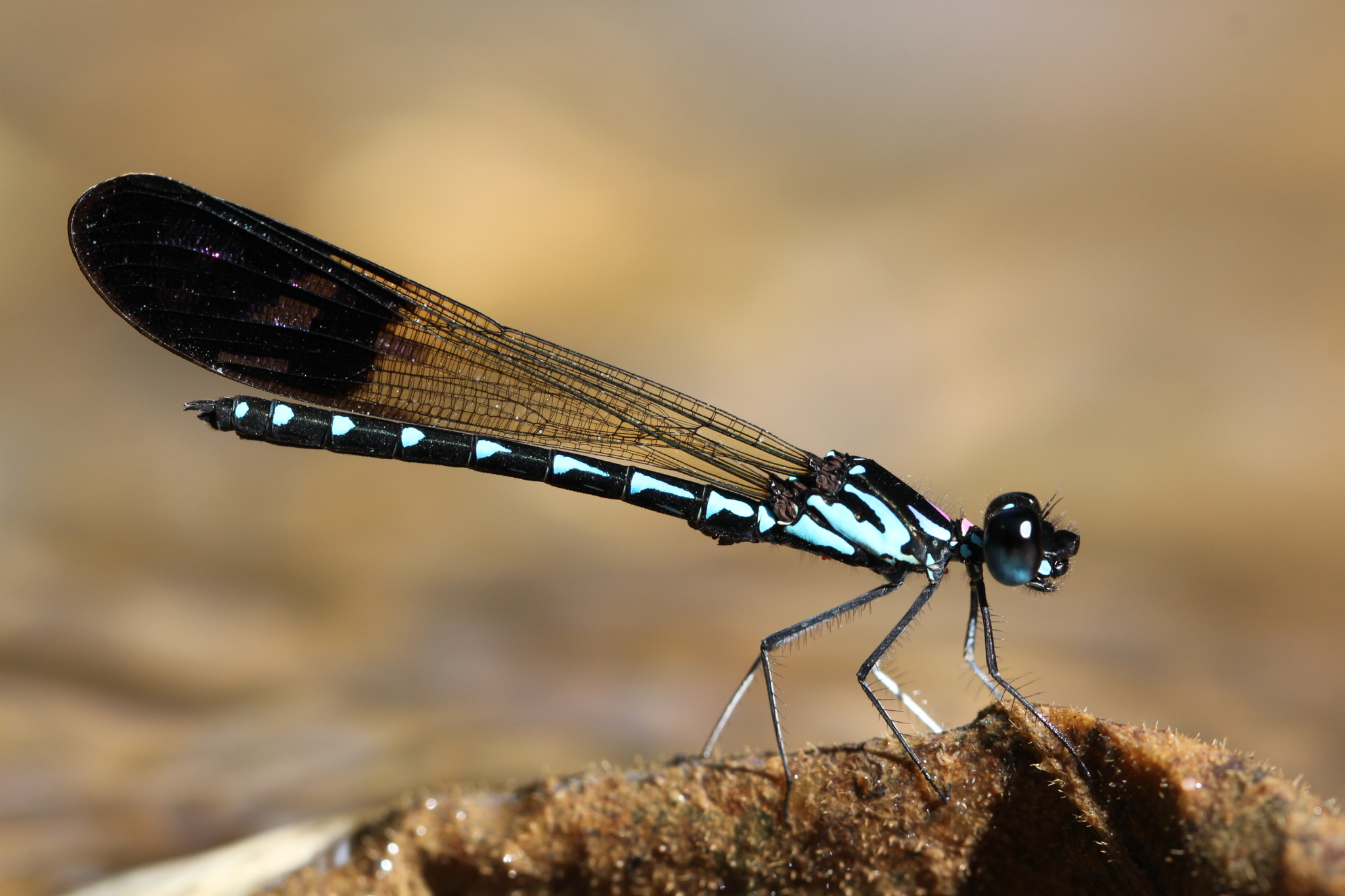

Scientific classification
- Domain: Eukaryota
- Kingdom: Animalia
- Phylum: Arthropoda
- Class: Insecta
- Order: Odonata
- Suborder: Zygoptera
- Family: Chlorocyphidae
- Genus: Heliocypha
- Species: H. perforata

Binomial name
- Heliocypha perforata Percheron, 1835

= Heliocypha perforata =

Species of insect

Heliocypha perforata, also known by its common name common blue jewel, is a species of damselfly from the genus Heliocypha.
