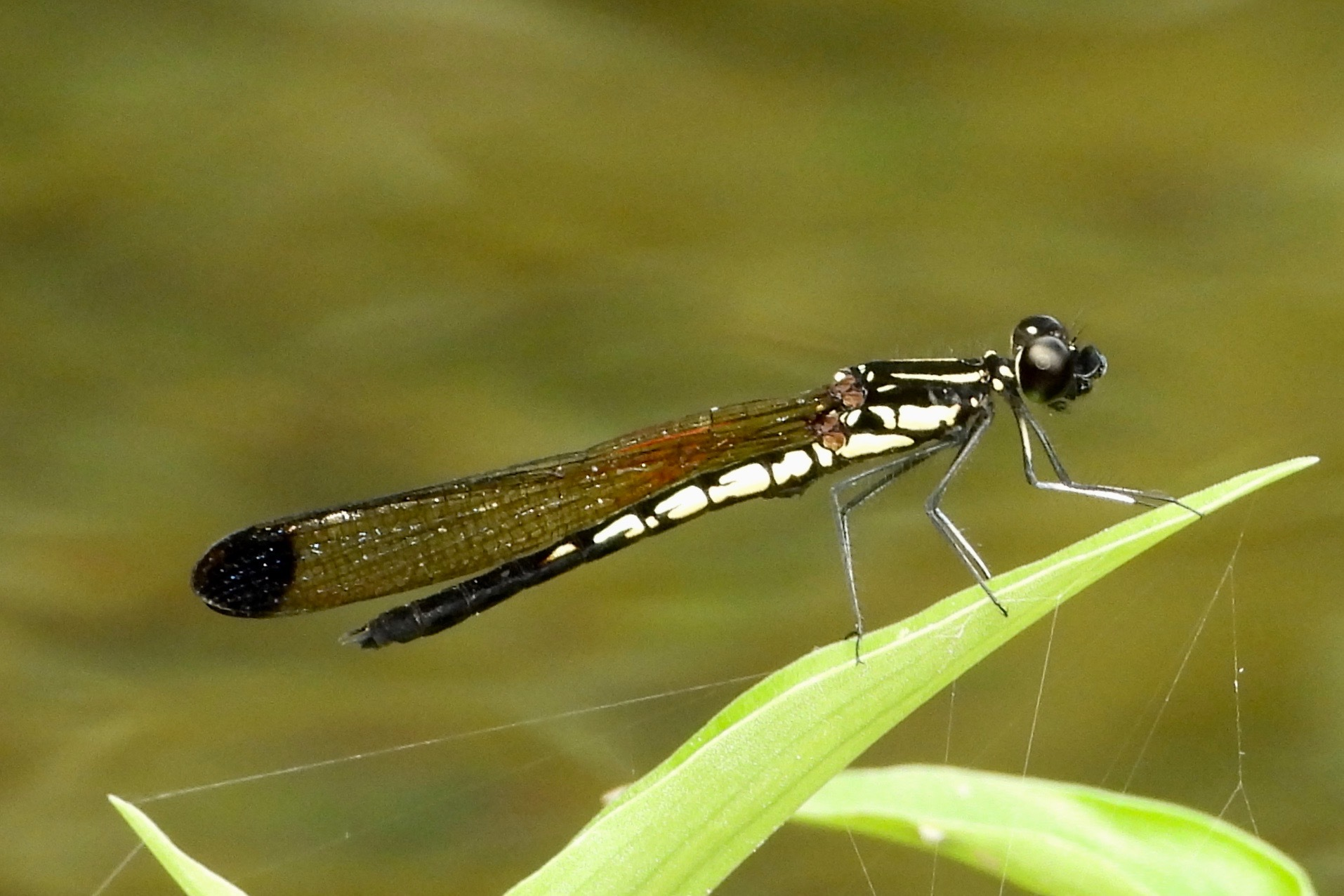

Scientific classification
- Kingdom: Animalia
- Phylum: Arthropoda
- Class: Insecta
- Order: Odonata
- Suborder: Zygoptera
- Family: Chlorocyphidae
- Genus: Libellago
- Species: L. finalis

Binomial name
- Libellago finalis (Hagen in Selys,1869)

= Libellago finalis =

Species of damselfly

Libellago finalis, is a species of damselfly in the family Chlorocyphidae. It is endemic to Sri Lanka. It is threatened by habitat loss.
