= Melanocypha =

Scientific classification
- Domain: Eukaryota
- Kingdom: Animalia
- Phylum: Arthropoda
- Class: Insecta
- Order: Odonata
- Suborder: Zygoptera
- Family: Chlorocyphidae
- Genus: Melanocypha; Fraser, 1949
- Species: M. snellemanni

Binomial name
- Melanocypha snellemanni (Albarda in Selys, 1879)

Genus of damselflies

Melanocypha is a genus of jewel damselfly in the family Chlorocyphidae. There is one described species in Melanocypha, M. snellemanni.
