= T. potens =

T. potens may refer to:

- Thylacinus potens, a prehistoric mammal species
- Titanophoneus potens, a prehistoric synapsid species

== See also ==
- Potens (disambiguation)
