= Aristocypha fulgipennis =

Conservation status
- Data Deficient (IUCN 3.1)

Scientific classification
- Kingdom: Animalia
- Phylum: Arthropoda
- Clade: Pancrustacea
- Class: Insecta
- Order: Odonata
- Suborder: Zygoptera
- Family: Chlorocyphidae
- Genus: Aristocypha
- Species: A. fulgipennis

Binomial name
- Aristocypha fulgipennis (Guérin, 1831)

Synonyms
- Rhinocypha fulgipennis Guérin, 1831; Agrion fulgipennis Guérin, 1831

Species of damselfly

Aristocypha fulgipennis is a species of damselfly in the genus Aristocypha. It is native to Laos and Vietnam.
