= Pachycypha =

Scientific classification
- Kingdom: Animalia
- Phylum: Arthropoda
- Clade: Pancrustacea
- Class: Insecta
- Order: Odonata
- Suborder: Zygoptera
- Family: Chlorocyphidae
- Genus: Pachycypha; Lieftinck, 1950
- Species: P. aurea

Binomial name
- Pachycypha aurea Lieftinck, 1950

Genus of damselflies

Pachycypha is a genus of jewel damselfly in the family Chlorocyphidae. There is one described species in Pachycypha, P. aurea.
