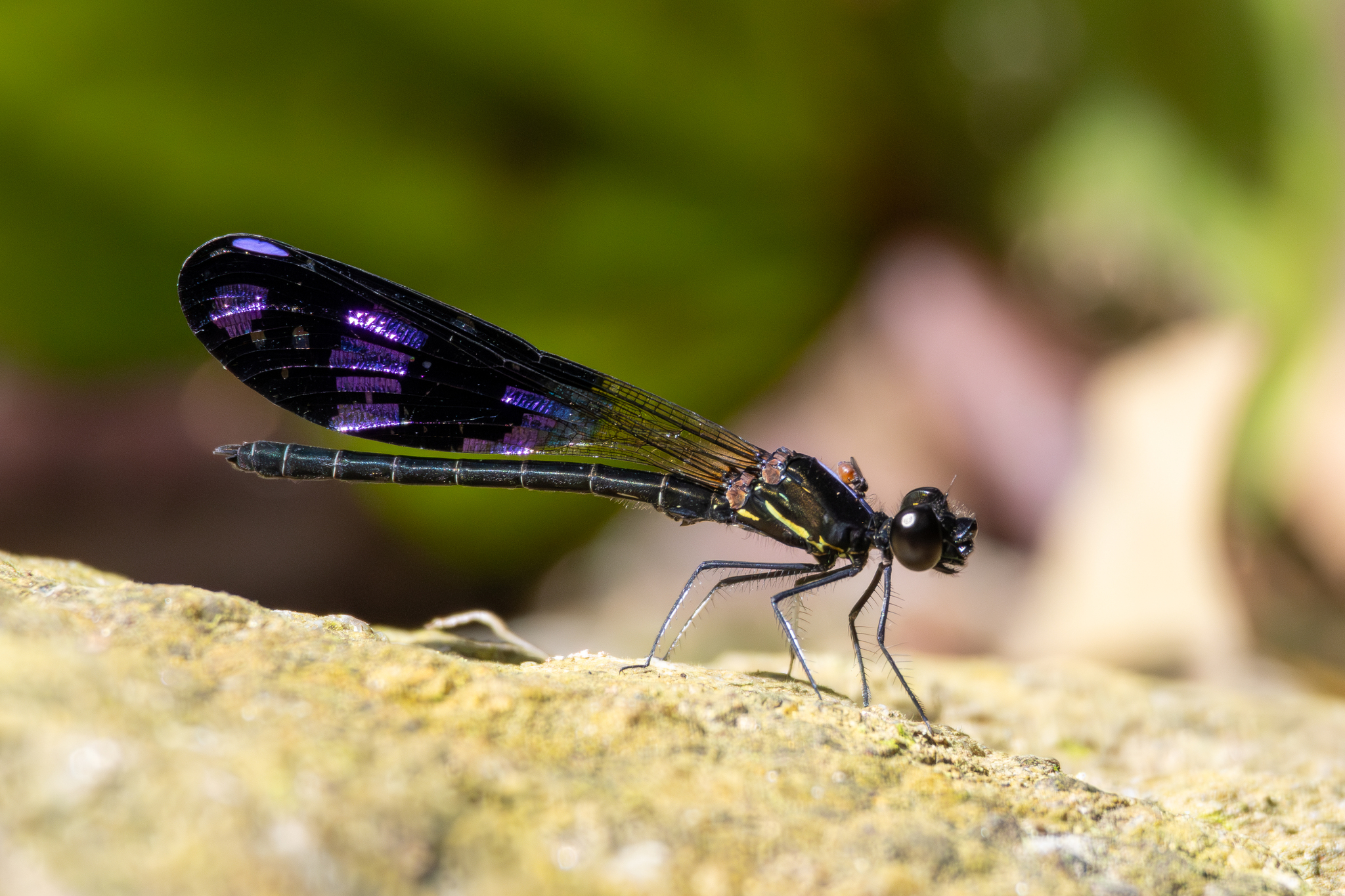
- Aristocypha fenestrella male in Malaysia
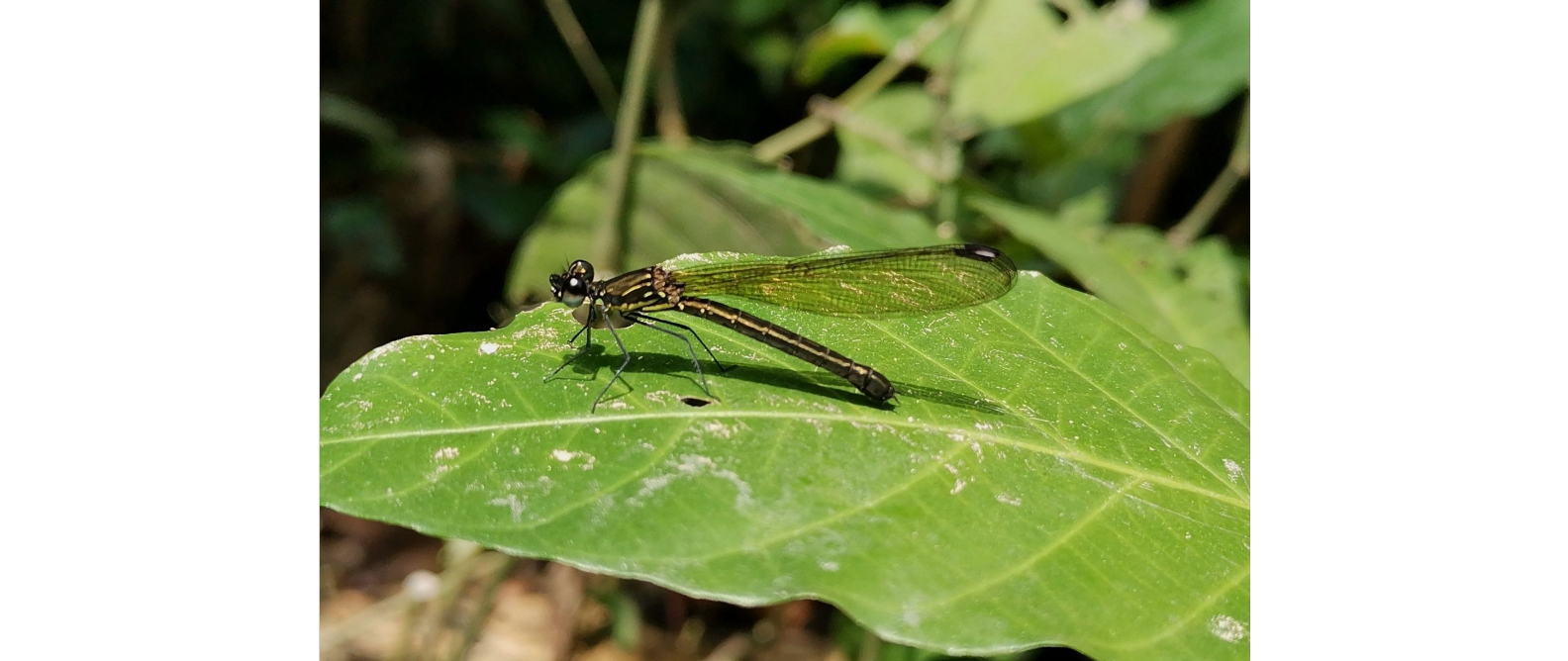
- Aristocypha fenestrella female

Scientific classification
- Kingdom: Animalia
- Phylum: Arthropoda
- Clade: Pancrustacea
- Class: Insecta
- Order: Odonata
- Suborder: Zygoptera
- Family: Chlorocyphidae
- Genus: Aristocypha
- Species: A. fenestrella

Binomial name
- Aristocypha fenestrella (Rambur, 1842)

Synonyms
- Rhinocypha fenestrella Rambur, 1842

= Aristocypha fenestrella =

Species of damselfly

Aristocypha fenestrella is a species of Asian damselfly.

== Description ==
Males have bright violet or magenta spots on their wings and vibrant yellow stripes on their necks. The females are much duller in appearance, however, they still have the "violet, window-like" look of the males. Males normally have a pink-magenta triangle on the top of their neck.

== Range and habitat ==
This species is found in the lowlands of the Indomalayan Realm. It is normally found at an altitude up to 1,700 m (5,600 ft) above sea level.

It normally lives on or around rivers or streams and their banks.
