= Watuwila =

Scientific classification
- Domain: Eukaryota
- Kingdom: Animalia
- Phylum: Arthropoda
- Class: Insecta
- Order: Odonata
- Suborder: Zygoptera
- Family: Chlorocyphidae
- Genus: Watuwila van Tol, 1998
- Species: W. vervoorti

Binomial name
- Watuwila vervoorti van Tol, 1998

Genus of damselflies

Watuwila is a genus of jewel damselfly in the family Chlorocyphidae. There is one described species in Watuwila, W. vervoorti.
