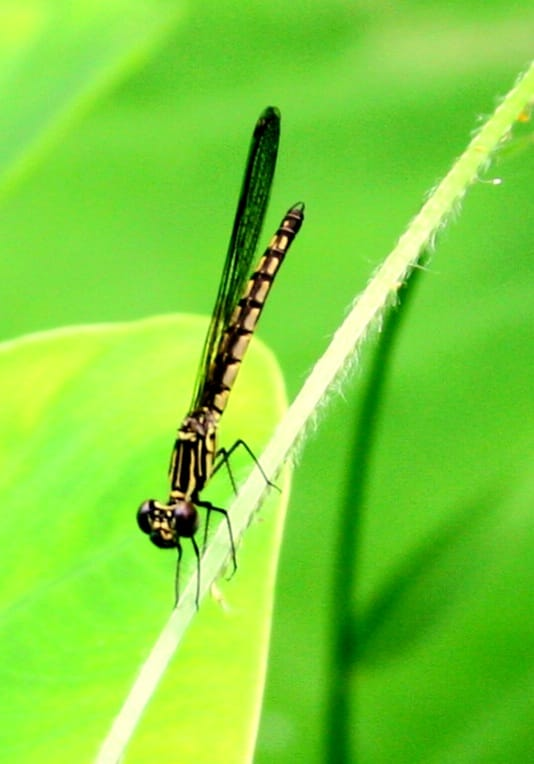

Scientific classification
- Kingdom: Animalia
- Phylum: Arthropoda
- Class: Insecta
- Order: Odonata
- Suborder: Zygoptera
- Family: Chlorocyphidae
- Genus: Libellago
- Species: L. adami

Binomial name
- Libellago adami Fraser, 1939

= Libellago adami =

Adam's gem

Species of damselfly

Libellago adami, Adam's gem, is a species of damselfly in the family Chlorocyphidae. It is endemic to Sri Lanka. Its natural habitats are streams and lowland wet zone rivers, where there is fast flowing waters exist. It is threatened by habitat loss.
