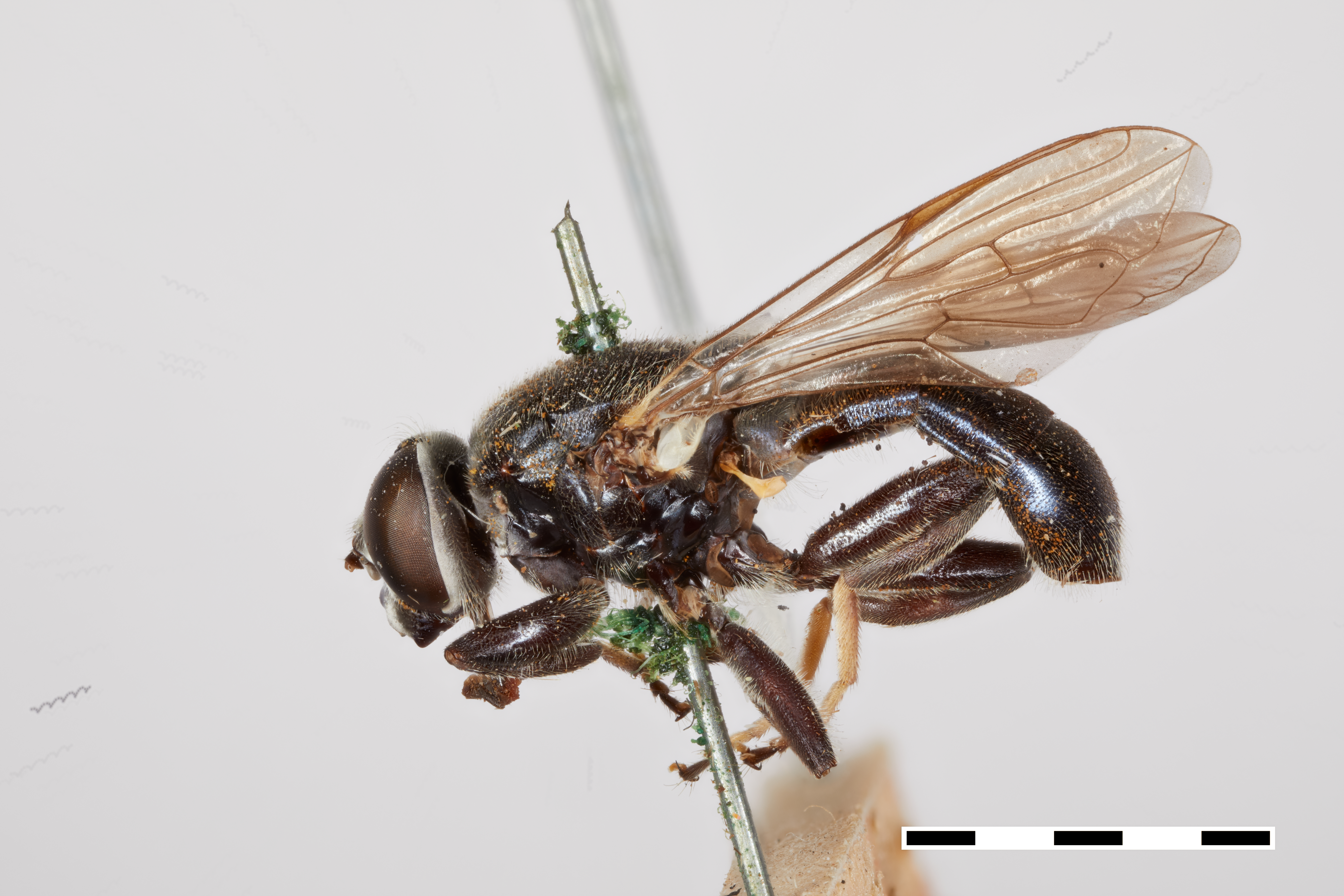
- M. nigra

Scientific classification
- Domain: Eukaryota
- Kingdom: Animalia
- Phylum: Arthropoda
- Class: Insecta
- Order: Diptera
- Family: Syrphidae
- Subfamily: Eristalinae
- Tribe: Brachyopini
- Genus: Myolepta
- Species: M. nigra

Binomial name
- Myolepta nigra (Loew, 1972)

Synonyms
- Myiolepta nigra Loew, 1872; Xylota tuberans Williston, 1887

= Myolepta nigra =

Species of fly

Myolepta nigra (Loew, 1872), the Black Pegleg , is an uncommon species of syrphid fly observed in the eastern and central United States and Eastern Canada. Hoverflies can remain nearly motionless in flight. The adults are also known as flower flies for they are commonly found on flowers from which they get both energy-giving nectar and protein-rich pollen. The larvae of this genus are found in the rotholes of deciduous trees.
