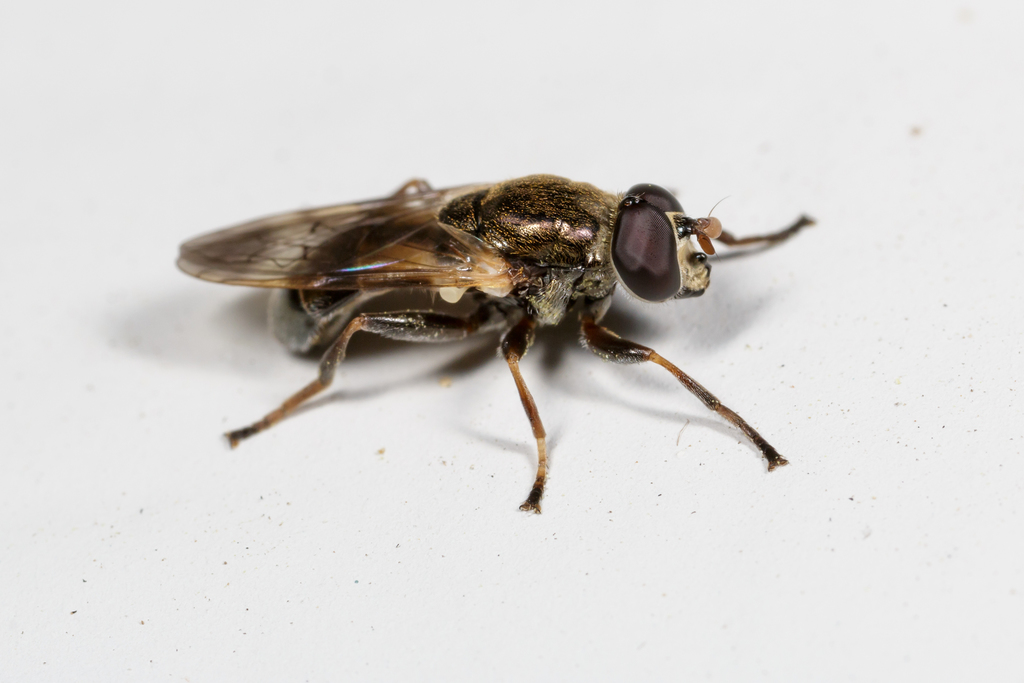

Scientific classification
- Kingdom: Animalia
- Phylum: Arthropoda
- Class: Insecta
- Order: Diptera
- Family: Syrphidae
- Subfamily: Eristalinae
- Tribe: Brachyopini
- Genus: Myolepta
- Species: M. varipes

Binomial name
- Myolepta varipes (Loew, 1869)

Synonyms
- Myiolepta pretiosa Hull, 1923; Myiolepta varipes Loew, 1869

= Myolepta varipes =

Species of fly

Myolepta varipes (Loew, 1869), the Orange-banded Pegleg , is an uncommon species of syrphid fly observed in the eastern half of the United States. Hoverflies can remain nearly motionless in flight. The adults are also known as flower flies, for they are commonly found on flowers from which they get both energy-giving nectar and protein-rich pollen. The larvae of this genus are found in the rot holes of deciduous trees.
