= Indocypha =

Scientific classification
- Kingdom: Animalia
- Phylum: Arthropoda
- Clade: Pancrustacea
- Class: Insecta
- Order: Odonata
- Suborder: Zygoptera
- Family: Chlorocyphidae
- Subfamily: Indocyphinae; Fomekong-Lontchi, Kalkman & Bybee, 2026
- Genus: Indocypha; Fraser, 1949

Genus of damselflies

Indocypha is a genus of jewel damselfly in the family Chlorocyphidae. It is the only genus in the subfamily Indocyphinae. There are seven described species in Indocypha. The species was first spotted in Thailand.

== Species ==
These eight species belong to the genus Indocypha:

- Indocypha catopta Zhang, Hämäläinen & Tong, 2010
- Indocypha chishuiensis Zhou & Zhou, 2006
- Indocypha cyanicauda Zhang & Hämäläinen, 2018
- Indocypha katharina (Needham, 1930)
- Indocypha neglecta Hämäläinen, 2014
- Indocypha silbergliedi Asahina, 1988
- Indocypha svenhedini (Sjöstedt, 1933)
- Indocypha vittata (Selys, 1891)
