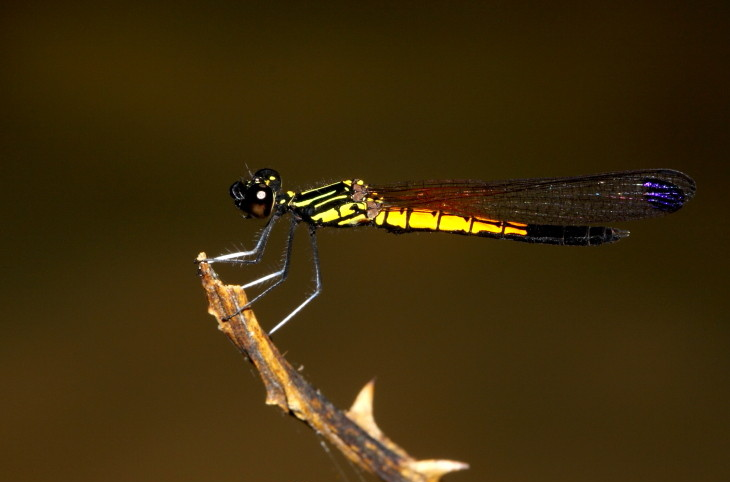
- Male
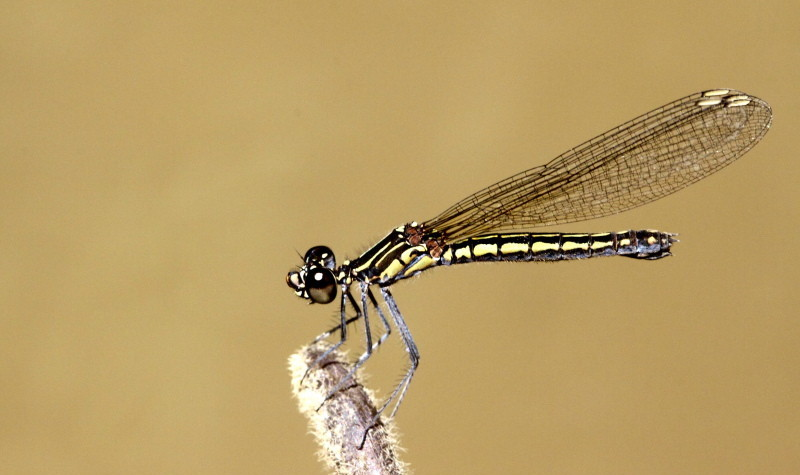
- Female

Conservation status
- Least Concern (IUCN 3.1)

Scientific classification
- Kingdom: Animalia
- Phylum: Arthropoda
- Class: Insecta
- Order: Odonata
- Suborder: Zygoptera
- Family: Chlorocyphidae
- Genus: Libellago
- Species: L. lineata

Binomial name
- Libellago lineata (Burmeister, 1839)

Synonyms
- Micromerus obscurus Kirby, 1886; Micromerus uxor Rambur, 1842

= Libellago lineata =

River heliodor

Species of damselfly

Libellago lineata, the river heliodor, is a species of damselfly in the family Chlorocyphidae. It is found in many Asian countries.

The species is found in clear streams or rivers.

== Subspecies ==
Three have been named:

- L. lineata andamanensis (Fraser 1924) - Andaman and Nicobar Islands
- L. lineata indica (Fraser, 1928) - South India
- L. lineata lineata (Burmeister, 1839) - Southeast Asia, Northeast India

The subspecies Libellago lineata andamanensis and L. lineata indica are now generally considered as new species, Libellago andamanensis and Libellago indica.

== See also ==
- List of odonates of India
- List of odonates of Sri Lanka
