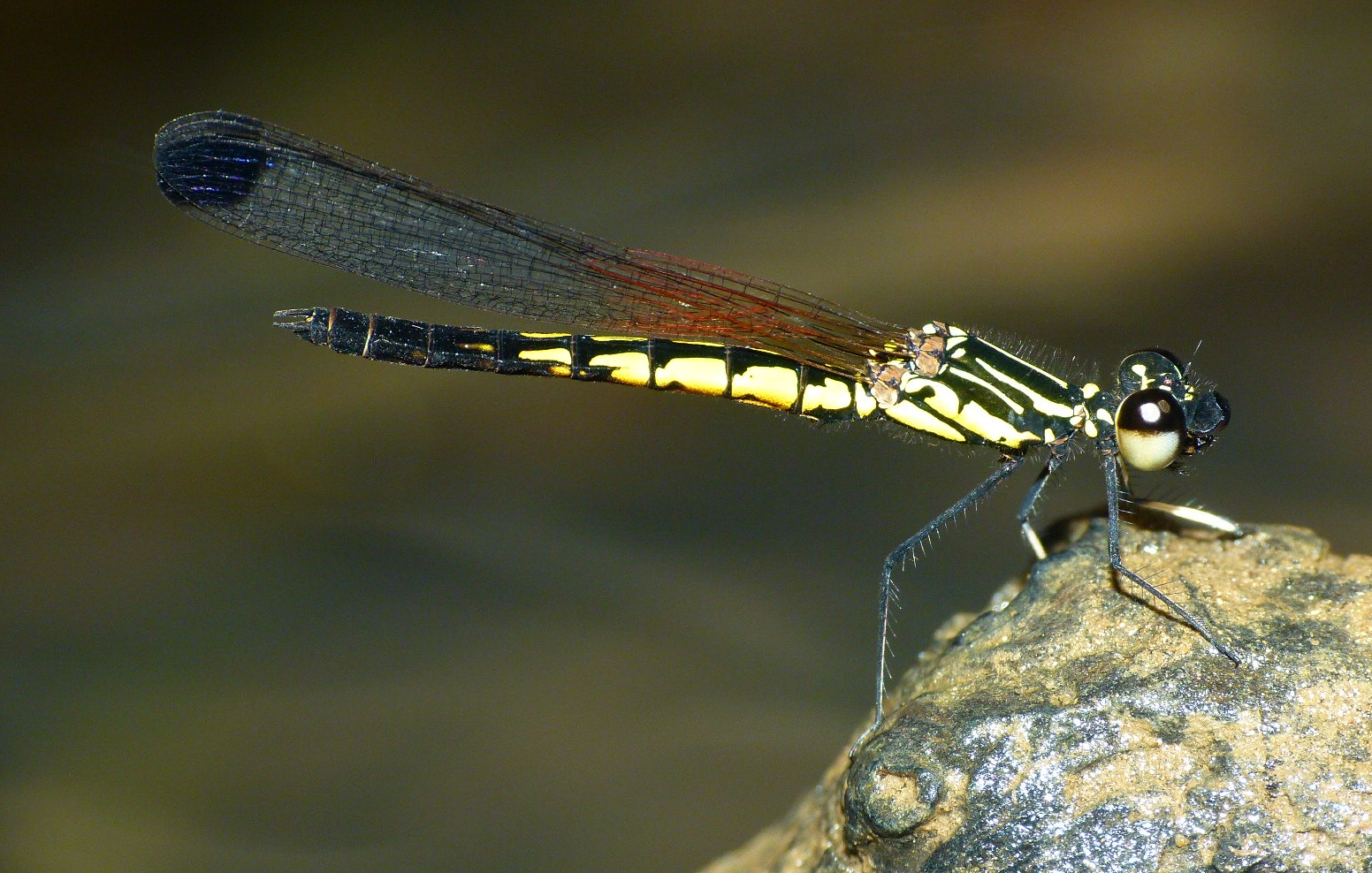
- Libellago indica, male

Scientific classification
- Kingdom: Animalia
- Phylum: Arthropoda
- Clade: Pancrustacea
- Class: Insecta
- Order: Odonata
- Suborder: Zygoptera
- Family: Chlorocyphidae
- Subfamily: Libellagininae; Bianchi, 1905
- Genus: Libellago; Selys, 1840

= Libellago =

Genus of damselflies

Libellago is a genus of damselflies in the family Chlorocyphidae. It is the only genus in the subfamily Libellagininae. Species of Libellago are found mainly in Southeast Asia.

== Taxonomic history ==
Selys established the genus Libellago in 1840, in his Monographie des libellulidées d'Europe, as one of two new non-European genera separated from Calopteryx. In 1853, he established the "Legion Libellago", a group of damselflies centred on the genus.

The subfamily name Libellagininae was introduced by Bianchi in 1905, in the work published jointly with Jakobson.

Laidlaw proposed the subfamily Libellaginae in 1917, and subsequent authors also used the names Libellagini and Libellaginidae at tribal and family rank, respectively. The name Libellaginidae was formerly applied more broadly to the damselflies now placed in Chlorocyphidae.

In modern classifications, Libellagininae is recognised as a subfamily of Chlorocyphidae, comprising only the genus Libellago.

== Species ==
The following are included in BioLib.cz:

1. Libellago adami Fraser, 1939
2. Libellago andamanensis (Fraser, 1924)
3. Libellago asclepiades (Ris, 1916)
4. Libellago aurantiaca (Selys, 1859)
5. Libellago balus Hämäläinen, 2002
6. Libellago blanda (Hagen in Selys, 1853)
7. Libellago celebensis van Tol, 2007
8. Libellago corbeti van der Poorten, 2009
9. Libellago daviesi van Tol, 2007
10. Libellago dorsocyana Lieftinck, 1937
11. Libellago finalis (Hagen in Selys, 1869)
12. Libellago greeni (Laidlaw, 1924)
13. Libellago hyalina (Selys, 1859)
14. Libellago indica (Fraser, 1928)
15. Libellago lineata (Burmeister, 1839)
16. Libellago manganitu van Tol, 2007
17. Libellago naias Lieftinck, 1932
18. Libellago orri Dow & Hämäläinen, 2008
19. Libellago phaethon (Laidlaw, 1931)
20. Libellago rufescens (Selys, 1873)
21. Libellago semiopaca (Selys, 1873)
22. Libellago stictica (Selys, 1869)
23. Libellago stigmatizans (Selys, 1859)
24. Libellago sumatrana (Albarda in Selys, 1879)
25. Libellago xanthocyana (Selys, 1869)
