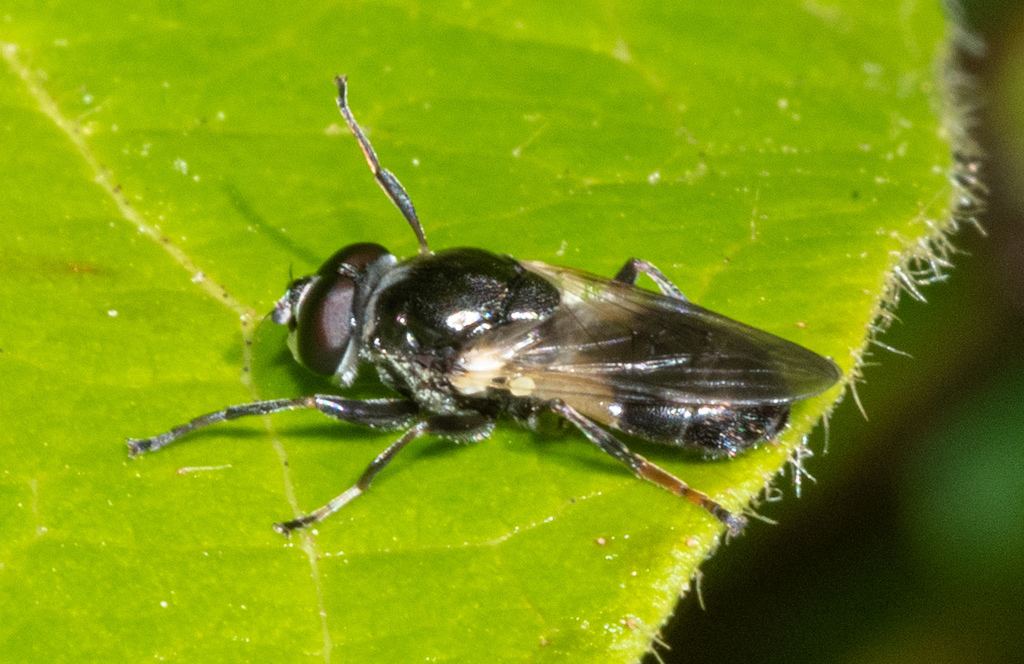

Scientific classification
- Kingdom: Animalia
- Phylum: Arthropoda
- Class: Insecta
- Order: Diptera
- Family: Syrphidae
- Subfamily: Eristalinae
- Tribe: Brachyopini
- Genus: Myolepta
- Species: M. lunulata

Binomial name
- Myolepta lunulata Bigot, 1884

Synonyms
- Myiolepta californica Shannon, 1923; Xylota stigmatipennis Lovett, 1919

= Myolepta lunulata =

Species of fly

Myolepta lunulata is a species of syrphid fly in the family Syrphidae.
