= Disparocypha =

Scientific classification
- Kingdom: Animalia
- Phylum: Arthropoda
- Clade: Pancrustacea
- Class: Insecta
- Order: Odonata
- Suborder: Zygoptera
- Family: Chlorocyphidae
- Subfamily: Disparocyphinae; Fomekong-Lontchi, Kalkman & Bybee, 2026
- Genus: Disparocypha; Ris, 1916
- Species: D. biedermanni

Binomial name
- Disparocypha biedermanni Ris, 1916

Genus of damselflies

Disparocypha is a genus of jewel damselflies in the family Chlorocyphidae. It is the only genus in the subfamily Disparocyphinae. Disparocypha is monotypic with one described species, Disparocypha biedermanni.
