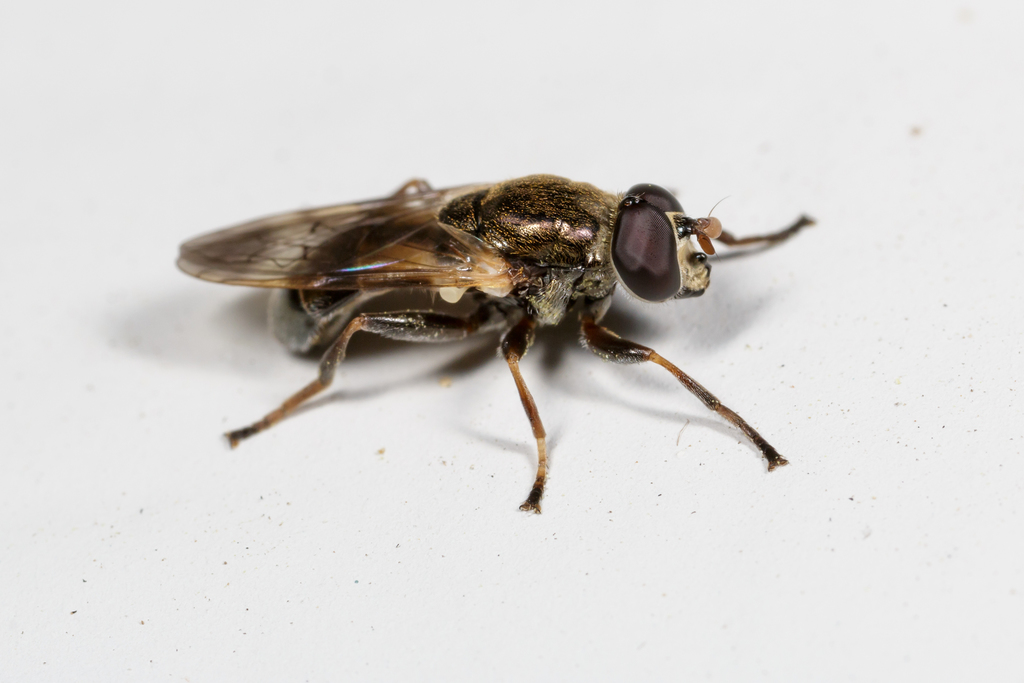
- Myolepta varipes

Scientific classification
- Kingdom: Animalia
- Phylum: Arthropoda
- Class: Insecta
- Order: Diptera
- Family: Syrphidae
- Subfamily: Eristalinae
- Tribe: Brachyopini
- Genus: Myolepta; Newman, 1838

Synonyms
- Leptomyia Walker, 1851; Myiolepta Newman, 1841

= Myolepta =

Genus of flies

Myolepta is a cosmopolitan genus of hoverflies most closely related to the genus Lepidomyia

== Species ==
Subgenus: Myolepta

- Myolepta auricaudata (Williston, 1891)
- Myolepta aurinota (Hine, 1903)
- Myolepta camillae Weems, 1956
- Myolepta difformis (Strobl, 1909)
- Myolepta dolorosa (Hull, 1941)
- Myolepta dubia (Fabricius, 1805)
- Myolepta greeni Hull, 1941i
- Myolepta haemorrhoidalis (Philippi, 1865)
- Myolepta luctuosa (Bigot, 1857a)
- Myolepta lunulata Bigot, 1884
- Myolepta luteola (Gmelin, 1790)
- Myolepta nausicaa (Hull, 1937a)
- Myolepta nigra (Loew, 1972)
- Myolepta nigritarsis Coe, 1957
- Myolepta obscura (Becher, 1882)
- Myolepta potens (Harris, 1776)
- Myolepta strigilata (Loew, 1872)
- Myolepta vara (Panzer, 1798)
- Myolepta varipes (Loew, 1869)

Subgenus: Protolepidostola

- Myolepta braziliana (Shannon, 1927a)
- Myolepta evansi Thompson, 1968
- Myolepta marinonii (Marinoni, 2004)
- Myolepta minuta Fluke, 1956
- Myolepta problematica Thompson, 1968
- Myolepta scintillans (Hull, 1946b)
