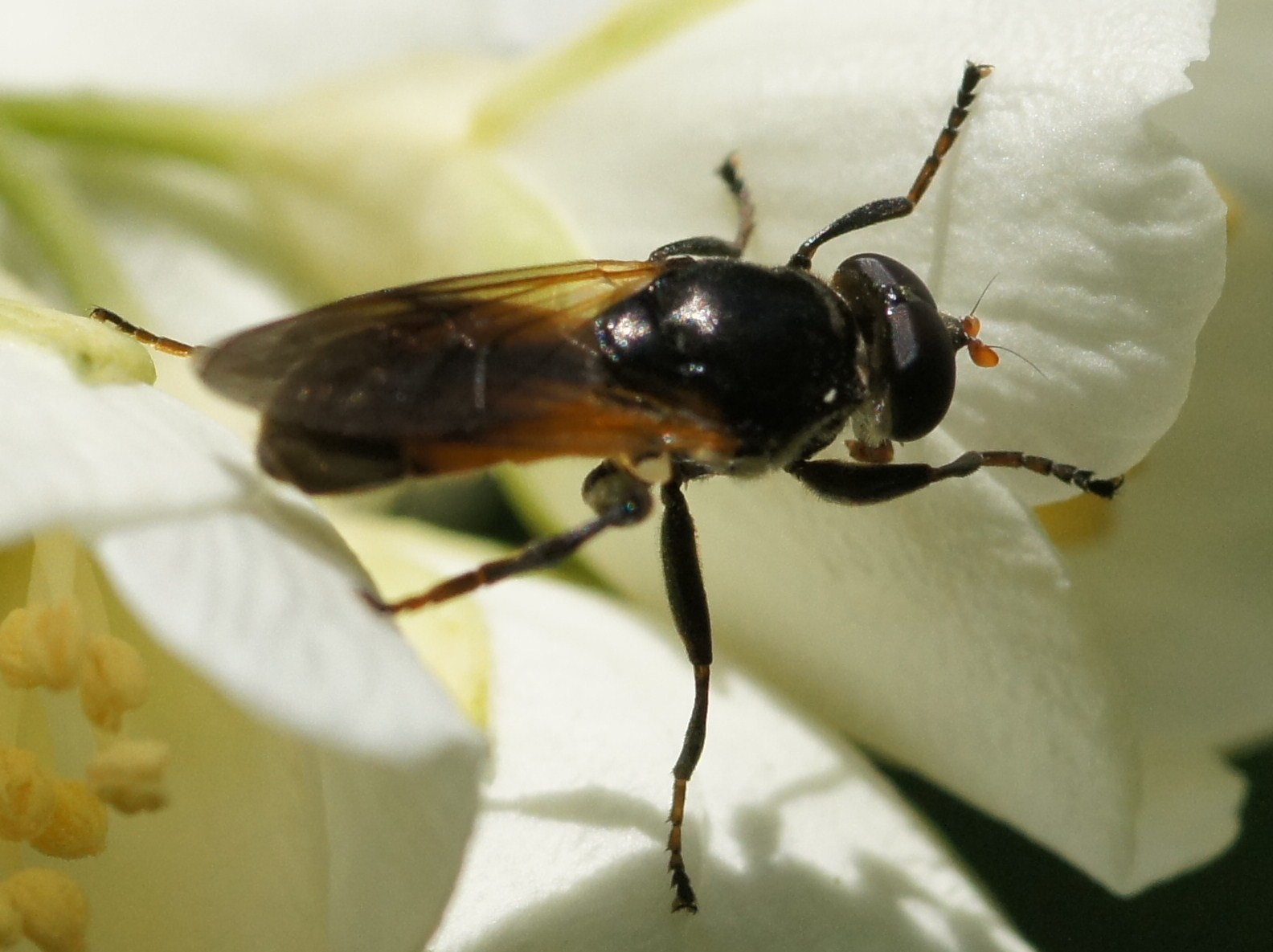
- Myolepta dubia (male)

Scientific classification
- Kingdom: Animalia
- Phylum: Arthropoda
- Class: Insecta
- Order: Diptera
- Family: Syrphidae
- Genus: Myolepta
- Species: M. dubia

Binomial name
- Myolepta dubia Fabricius, 1805

= Myolepta dubia =

Species of fly

Myolepta dubia is a European hoverfly.
