= Potency =

Potency may refer to:

- Potency (pharmacology), a measure of the activity of a drug in a biological system
- Virility
- Cell potency, a measure of the differentiation potential of stem cells
- In homeopathic dilutions, potency is a measure of how dilute a substance is
- Potency in philosophy is a specific potentiality in Aristotle's Theory of Potentiality and actuality, or "Act and Potency"; e.g., since the material, stone, is potentially a statue, it has a potency for statuehood, of which the form of any statue is the "act"

== See also ==
- Potent (disambiguation)
- Potens (disambiguation)
