= Cyrano (insect) =

Scientific classification
- Kingdom: Animalia
- Phylum: Arthropoda
- Clade: Pancrustacea
- Class: Insecta
- Order: Odonata
- Suborder: Zygoptera
- Family: Chlorocyphidae
- Subfamily: Cyranoinae; Fomekong-Lontchi, Kalkman & Bybee, 2026
- Genus: Cyrano; Needham & Gyger, 1939

Genus of insects

Cyrano is genus of damselflies in the family Chlorocyphidae, erected by James Needham and May Gyger in 1939. It is the only genus in the subfamily Cyranoinae. Species have been recorded from the Philippines.

== Species ==
The Global Biodiversity Information Facility lists:

1. Cyrano angustior Hämäläinen, 1989
2. Cyrano unicolor (Hagen, 1869)
