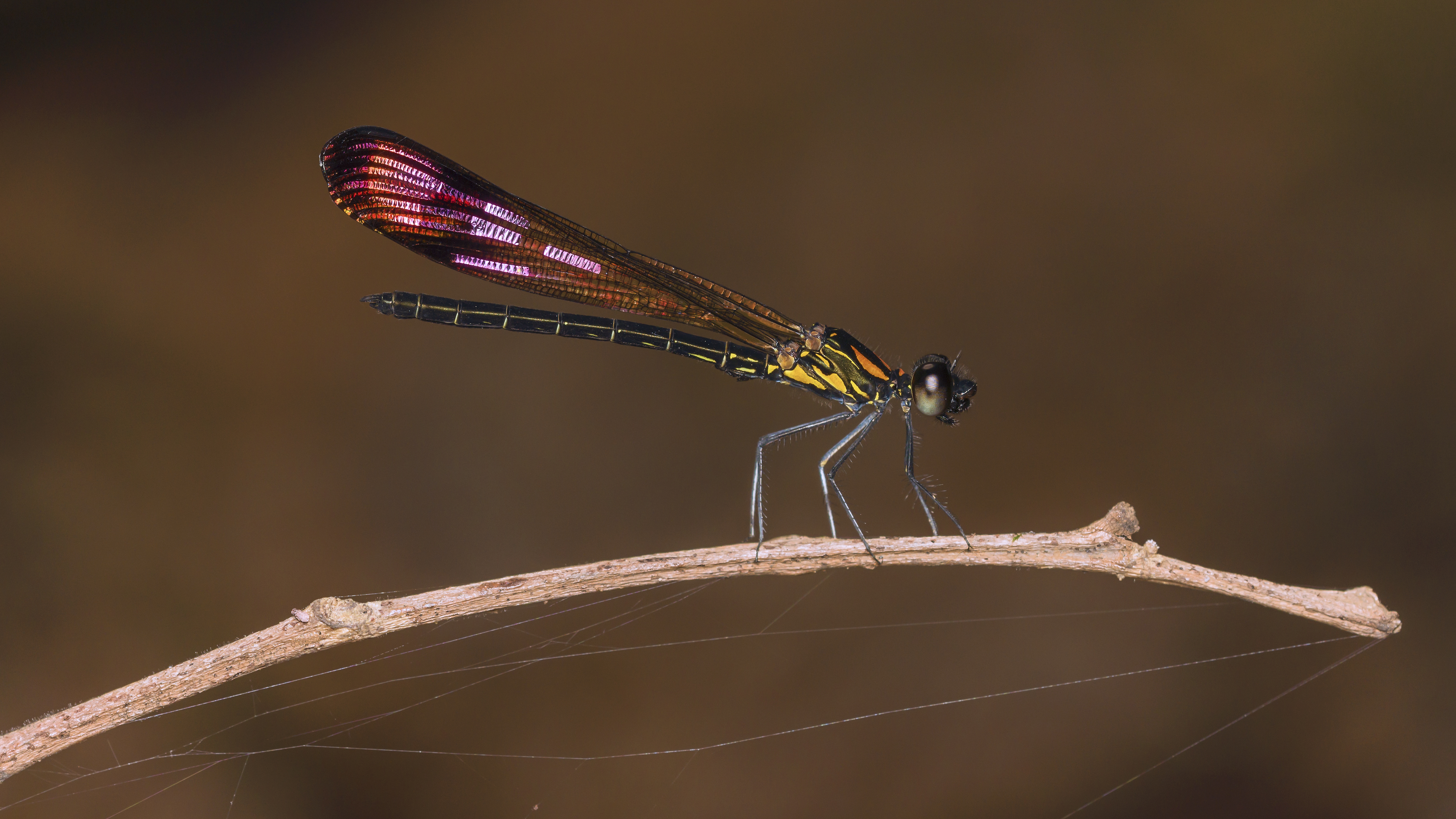
- Male
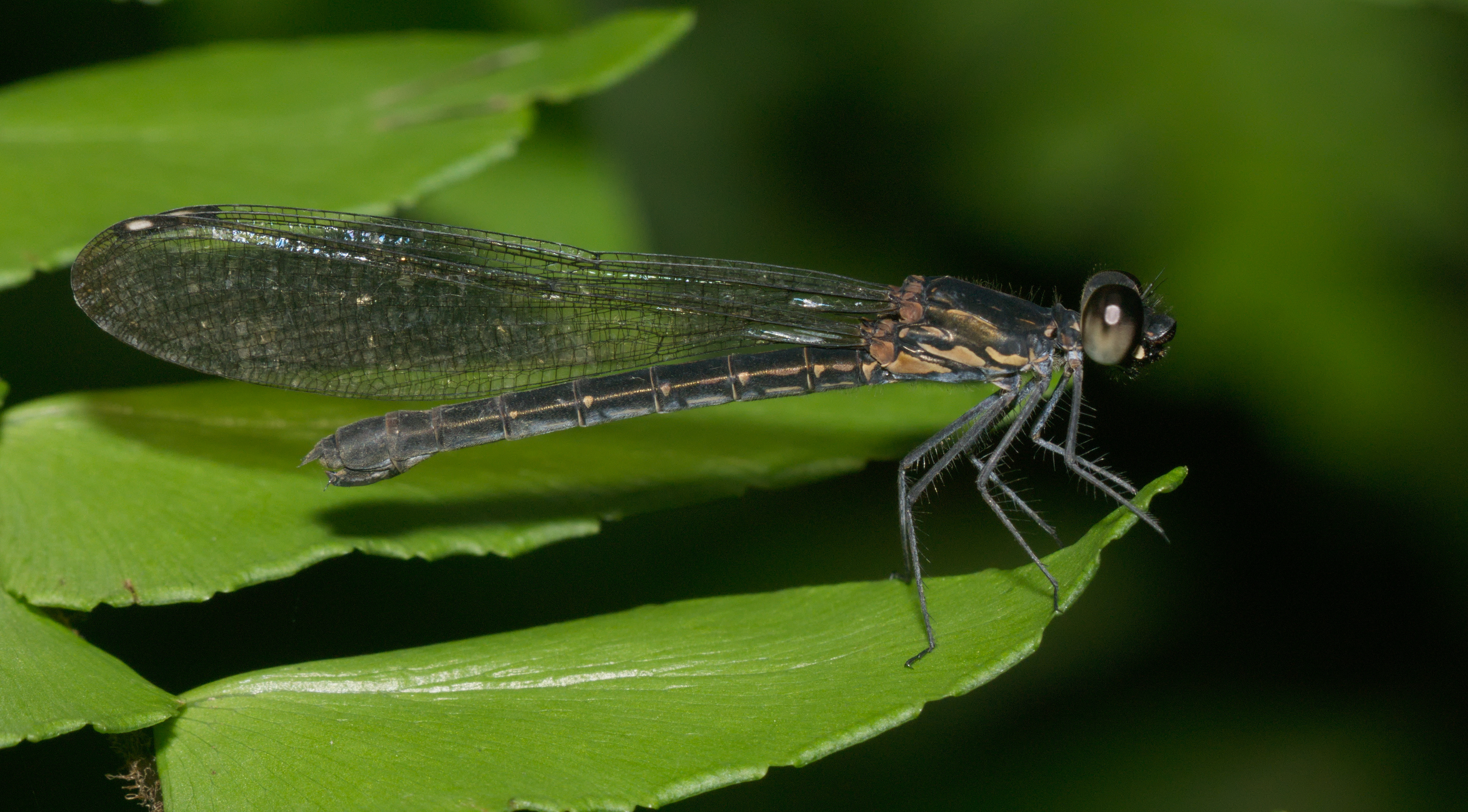
- Female

Conservation status
- Least Concern (IUCN 3.1)

Scientific classification
- Kingdom: Animalia
- Phylum: Arthropoda
- Class: Insecta
- Order: Odonata
- Suborder: Zygoptera
- Family: Chlorocyphidae
- Genus: Heliocypha
- Species: H. bisignata

Binomial name
- Heliocypha bisignata (Hagen, 1853)

Synonyms
- Rhinocypha bisignata Hagen, 1853

= Heliocypha bisignata =

Species of damselfly

Heliocypha bisignata, stream ruby, is a species of damselfly in the family Chlorocyphidae. It is endemic to South India where it breeds in hill streams in the southern part of the country.

== Description and habitat ==
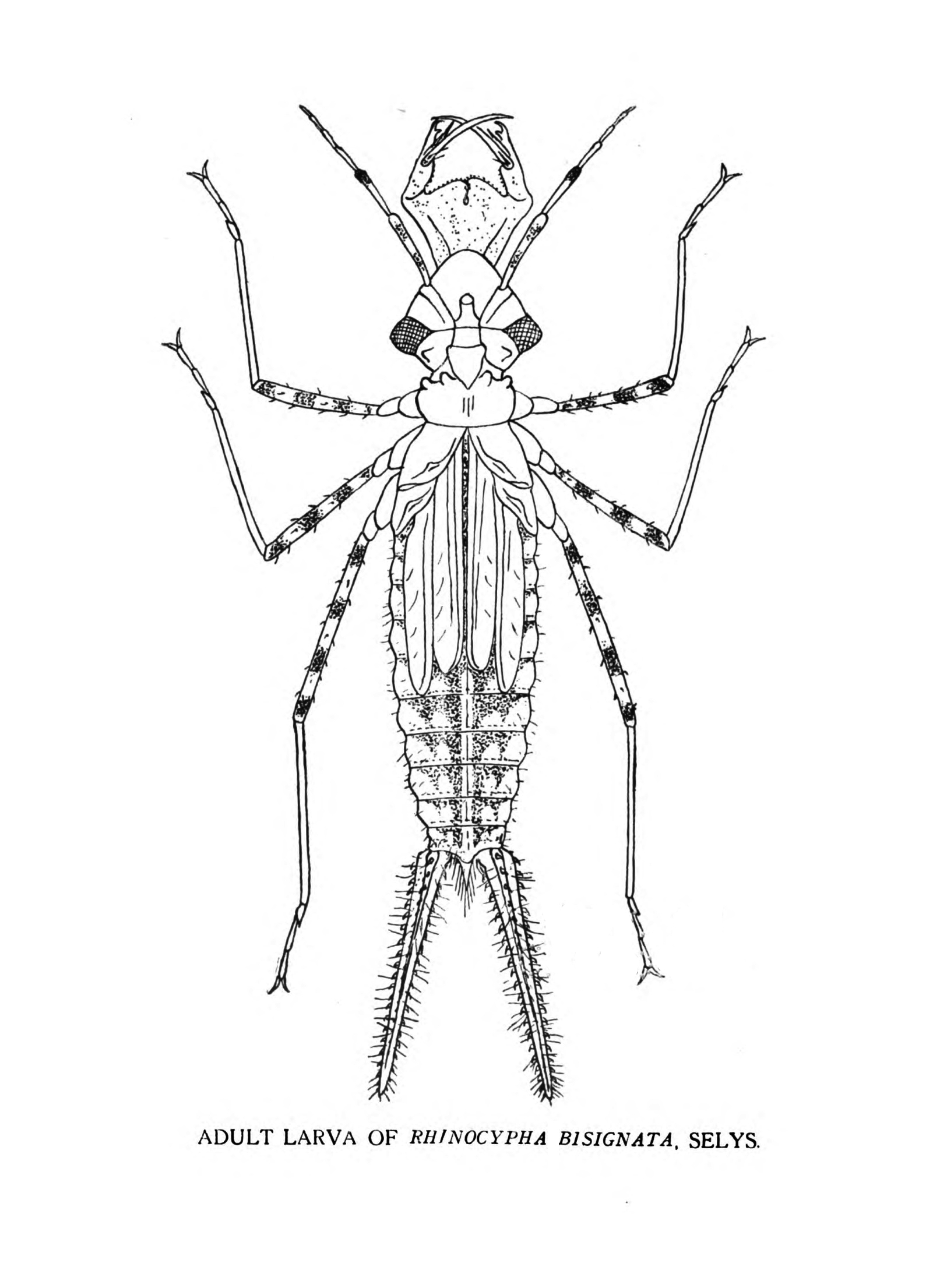
Naiad

It is a small damselfly with black head and big eyes. Its thorax is black with pink marks on the dorsum and yellow stripes on the lateral sides. Its fore-wings are transparent with outer fourth opaque in bright copper colors. Hind-wings are with outer third opaque, marked with two series of vitreous spots which glow with a copper or violet reflex. Its abdomen is black, marked with yellow mid-lateral stripes and dots in segments 2 to 6. Female has dull colors and transparent wings. Its pterostigma is black with a pale creamy center.

Males usually found perch on the rocks and floating logs and grasses in the forest stream. They fly occasionally to reveal their glistening wing patches. Females lay their eggs in submerged logs in forest streams.

== See also ==
- List of odonates of India
- List of odonata of Kerala
