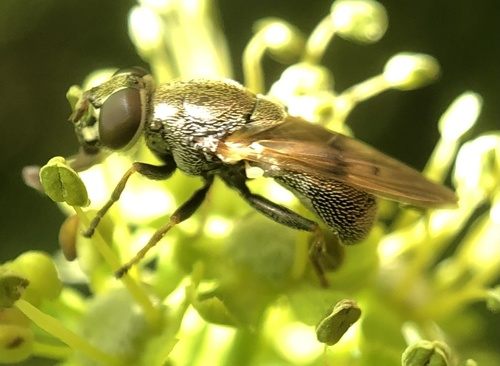
- M.strigilata

Scientific classification
- Domain: Eukaryota
- Kingdom: Animalia
- Phylum: Arthropoda
- Class: Insecta
- Order: Diptera
- Family: Syrphidae
- Subfamily: Eristalinae
- Tribe: Brachyopini
- Genus: Myolepta
- Species: M. strigilata

Binomial name
- Myolepta strigilata (Loew, 1872)

Synonyms
- Myiolepta strigilata Loew, 1872

= Myolepta strigilata =

Species of fly

Myolepta strigilata (Loew, 1872), the Scaled Pegleg, is an uncommon species of syrphid fly observed in the eastern and central United States. Hoverflies can remain nearly motionless in flight. The adults are also known as flower flies for they are commonly found on flowers, from which they get both energy-giving nectar and protein-rich pollen. The larvae of this genus have been found in rot holes of deciduous trees.
