= Potent =

Potent may refer to:

- Vair § Potent for the heraldic fur
- Warren Potent for the Australian Olympic medalist in shooting

See also:

- Potency (disambiguation)
