= Africocypha =

Scientific classification
- Kingdom: Animalia
- Phylum: Arthropoda
- Clade: Pancrustacea
- Class: Insecta
- Order: Odonata
- Suborder: Zygoptera
- Family: Chlorocyphidae
- Genus: Africocypha; Pinhey, 1961

Genus of damselflies

Africocypha is a genus of jewel damselfly in the family Chlorocyphidae. There are at least three described species in Africocypha.

The dragonfly species Africocypha centripunctata is also known as Chlorocypha centripunctata, the Banded Jewel or Nigerian damselflies, and known for their multi-color abdomens ranging from blue to yellow and red. They inhabit the streams of Nigeria's Obudu mountains, which has been exposed to deforestation, consequently leading to the endangerment status of the A. centripunctata species along with others of the same family.

== Anatomy and morphology ==
The abdomen color combinations vary from blue-white, yellow-orange, and bright red. Its family, Chlorocyphidae, are considered unique for their expanded eyes and clypeus in its adult stages, as well as its short abdomen, the larva's spiky paraprocts and reduced epiproct.

== Behavior ==
Current knowledge on chlorocyphid displays during threat and courtship involve aggressive flight patterns. Males fly parallel to each other when in a dispute. Males will also seize females in attempt to mate with them as they lay eggs.

== Distribution and habitat ==
Africocypha centripunctata along with other damselflies have been found in the Obudu Plateau region of Cross River State Nigeria. Citings of the A. centripunctata have been found in Cameroon in 2008 and Nigeria as of 2024. Its habitat requires bodies of water, and for that reason they are mainly found in wetlands, rainforest streams and tropical forests. Logging and wood harvesting for agriculture expansion have been potential threats that have led to their ecosystem degradation, therefore they have been listed as endangered as of 2017.

== Conservation ==
In April 2024, the Rufford Foundation presented a final evaluation report for the Ecological Survey of the Threatened and Relict Damselflies on the Obudu Plateau, Nigeria. The project was able to improve the awareness of odanates in Nigeria, confirm identity of the A. centipunctata larva and observe barbed wire fencing protecting landscapes that were initially open to human foot traffic.

== Species ==
These three species belong to the genus Africocypha:

- Africocypha centripunctata (Gambles, 1975)
- Africocypha lacuselephantum (Karsch, 1899)
- Africocypha varicolor Dijkstra, Mézière & Günther, 2015
