= Myolepta potens =

Conservation status
- Least Concern (IUCN 3.1) (Europe regional assessment)

Scientific classification
- Kingdom: Animalia
- Phylum: Arthropoda
- Class: Insecta
- Order: Diptera
- Family: Syrphidae
- Genus: Myolepta
- Species: M. potens

Binomial name
- Myolepta potens Harris, 1776

Synonyms
- Musca potens Harris, 1780

Species of fly

Myolepta potens is a European hoverfly.

The species ranges from France and Germany through central Europe to the Black Sea. It is rare throughout its range and is listed in the Red Data Books of a number of its range states. It is listed by the Council of Europe as a Saproxylic (deadwood-dependent) Indicator species, because its presence indicates that a large quantity of standing deadwood is also present.

The species was discovered in Britain in 1945 by John Cowley at Loxley Wood and another woodland site near Shapwick in Somerset and identified by J. E. Collin. Cowley found more specimens in the same area in 1946, 1947 and 1949. Subsequently, fellow dipterist E. C. M. d'Assis-Fonseca found a single male in Blaise Wood near Bristol in 1949, and in 1950 E. E. Lowe found the species at Combe Dingle, which is close to the Blaise Castle Estate within which Blaise Wood lies. J. C. Hartley found six larvae in a rot-hole at Ashton Court, Bristol in 1961, thus providing proof of the species' breeding in Britain. Despite attempts to relocate the species in its Bristol and Somerset sites in the 1980s and 1990s, it has not been refound (Loxley Wood is largely coniferised and therefore no longer suitable for supporting the species).

In the Institute for Terrestrial Ecology's Provisional hoverfly atlas published in 2000, the species was listed as extinct. During an English Nature-commissioned survey of Moccas Park National Nature Reserve in Herefordshire, Andy Godfrey found Myolepta potens larvae in a rot-hole. Subsequent survey work revealed that there is a strong population at this site using rot holes in several different species of tree.

Two English names have been coined for this species, although neither has gained widespread usage: the Western wood-vase hoverfly and the Moccas hoverfly
