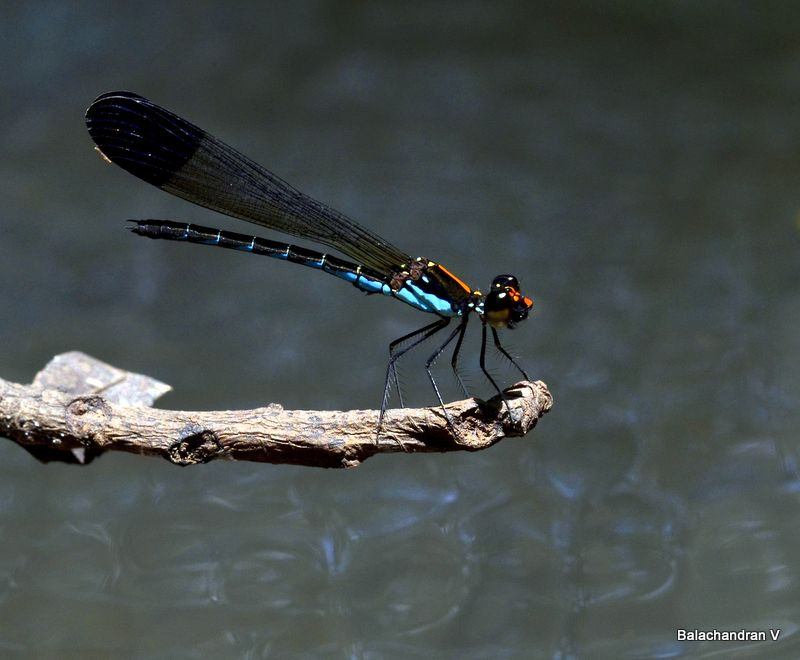
- Calocypha laidlawi

Scientific classification
- Domain: Eukaryota
- Kingdom: Animalia
- Phylum: Arthropoda
- Class: Insecta
- Order: Odonata
- Suborder: Zygoptera
- Family: Chlorocyphidae
- Genus: Calocypha; Fraser, 1928

= Calocypha =

Genus of damselflies

Calocypha is a genus of jewel damselfly in the family Chlorocyphidae. There are at least two described species in Calocypha.

== Species ==
These two species belong to the genus Calocypha:

- Calocypha laidlawi (Fraser, 1924)
- Calocypha petiolata
