= Sundacypha =

Scientific classification
- Domain: Eukaryota
- Kingdom: Animalia
- Phylum: Arthropoda
- Class: Insecta
- Order: Odonata
- Suborder: Zygoptera
- Family: Chlorocyphidae
- Genus: Sundacypha; Laidlaw, 1950

Genus of damselflies

Sundacypha is a genus of jewel damselfly in the family Chlorocyphidae. There are at least two described species in Sundacypha.

== Species ==
These two species belong to the genus Sundacypha:

- Sundacypha petiolata (Selys, 1859)
- Sundacypha striata Orr, 1999
