= Stenocypha =

Scientific classification
- Kingdom: Animalia
- Phylum: Arthropoda
- Class: Insecta
- Order: Odonata
- Suborder: Zygoptera
- Superfamily: Calopterygoidea
- Family: Chlorocyphidae
- Genus: Stenocypha; Dijkstra, 2013

Genus of damselflies

Stenocypha is a genus of damselflies in the family Chlorocyphidae, erected by Klaas-Douwe Dijkstra in 2013. Species have been recorded from tropical central Africa.

== Species ==
The Global Biodiversity Information Facility and BioLib list:

1. Stenocypha gracilis (Karsch, 1899)
2. Stenocypha hasta (Pinhey, 1960)
3. Stenocypha jacksoni (Pinhey, 1952)
4. Stenocypha molindica (Fraser, 1948)
5. Stenocypha tenuis (Longfield, 1936)
