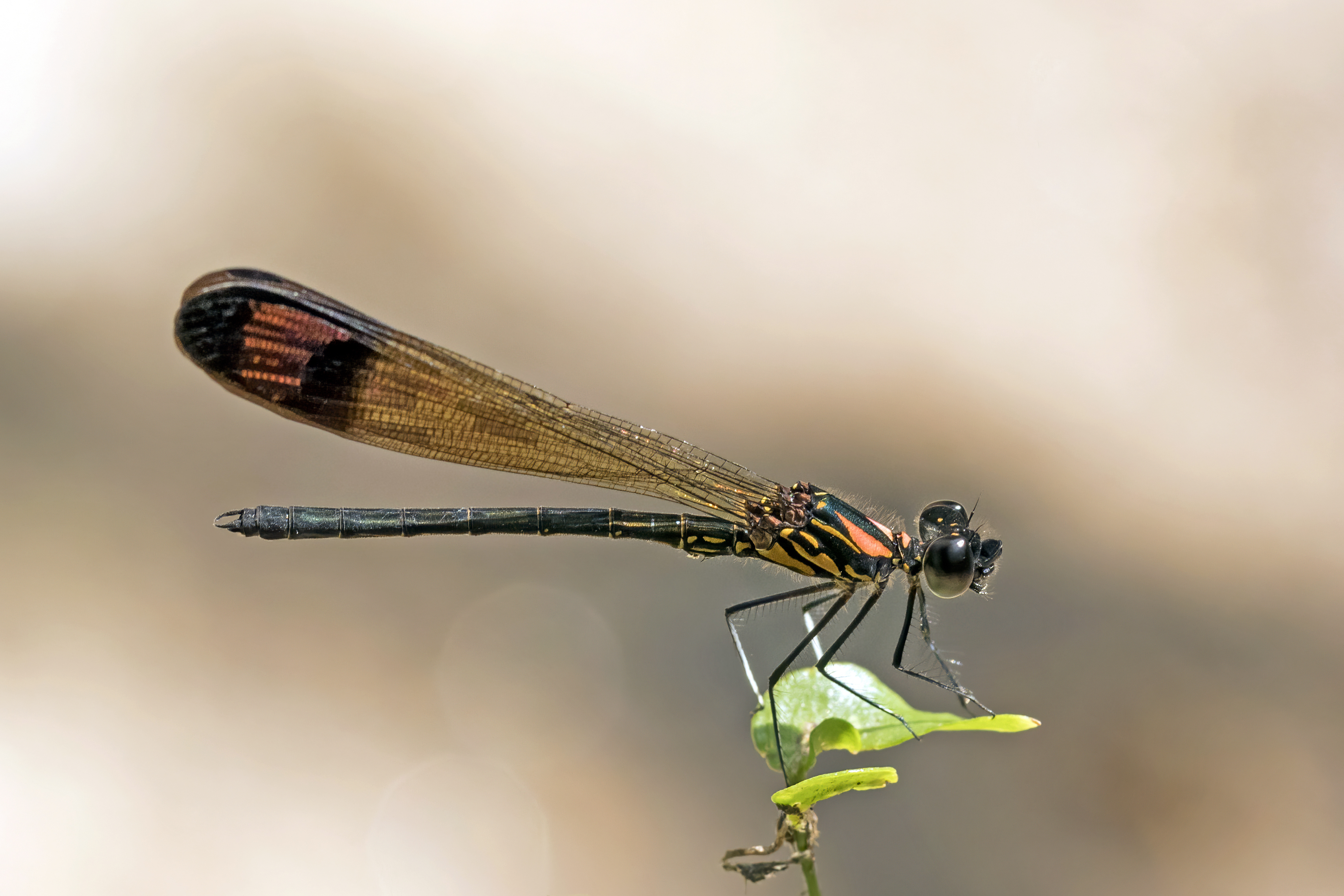
- male H. bisignata, India
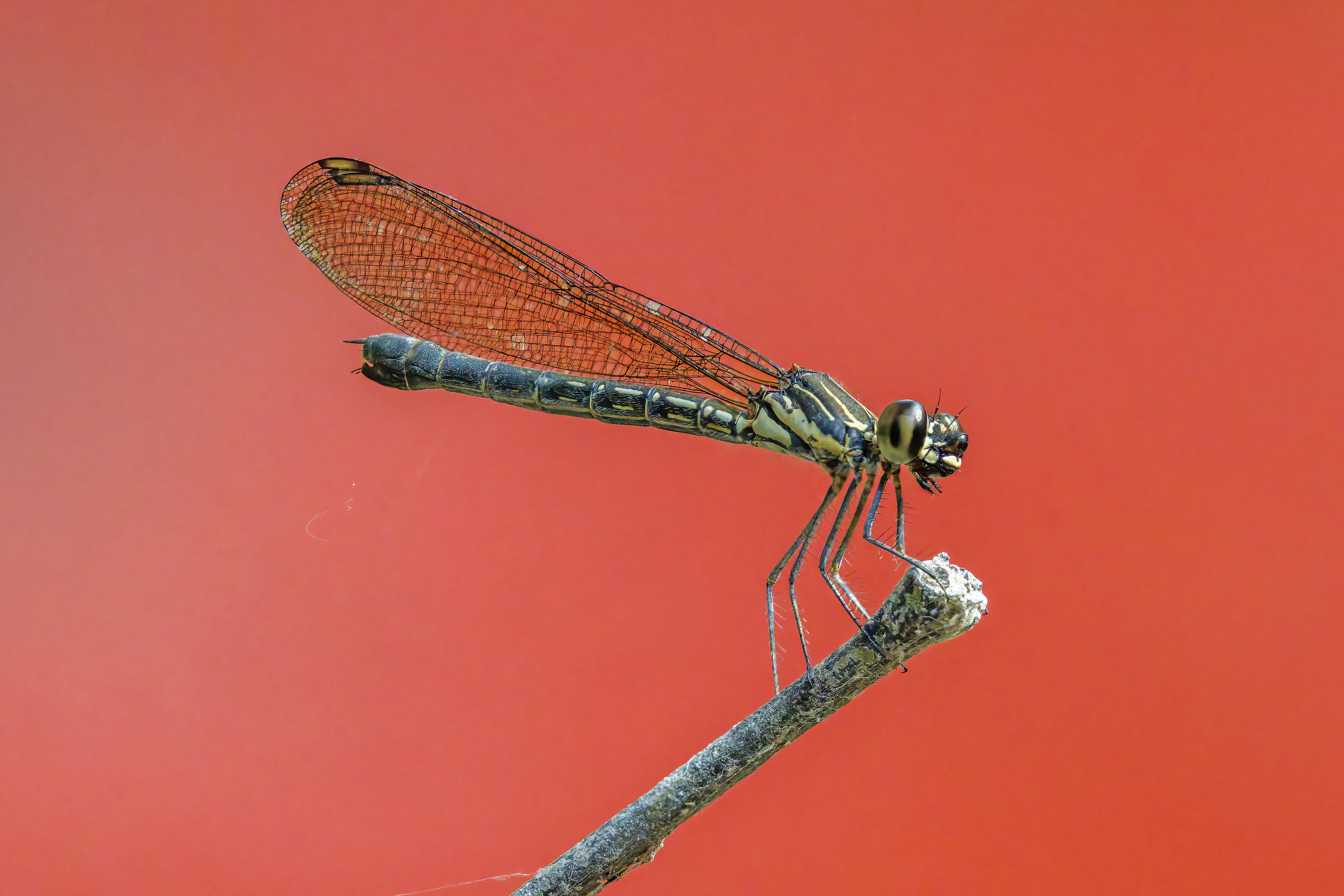
- female H. biforata, Laos

Scientific classification
- Kingdom: Animalia
- Phylum: Arthropoda
- Class: Insecta
- Order: Odonata
- Suborder: Zygoptera
- Family: Chlorocyphidae
- Genus: Heliocypha; Fraser, 1949

= Heliocypha =

Genus of damselflies

Heliocypha is a genus of jewel damselflies in the family Chlorocyphidae. There are about nine described species in Heliocypha, found in Indomalaya.

== Species ==
These nine species belong to the genus Heliocypha:

- Heliocypha angusta (Hagen in Selys, 1853)
- Heliocypha biforata (Selys, 1859)
- Heliocypha biseriata (Selys, 1859)
- Heliocypha bisignata (Hagen in Selys, 1853)
- Heliocypha fenestrata (Wiedemann in Burmeister, 1839)
- Heliocypha mariae (Lieftinck, 1930)
- Heliocypha nubecula (Lieftinck, 1948)
- Heliocypha perforata (Percheron, 1835) (Common Blue Jewel)
- Heliocypha vantoli Hämäläinen, 2016
