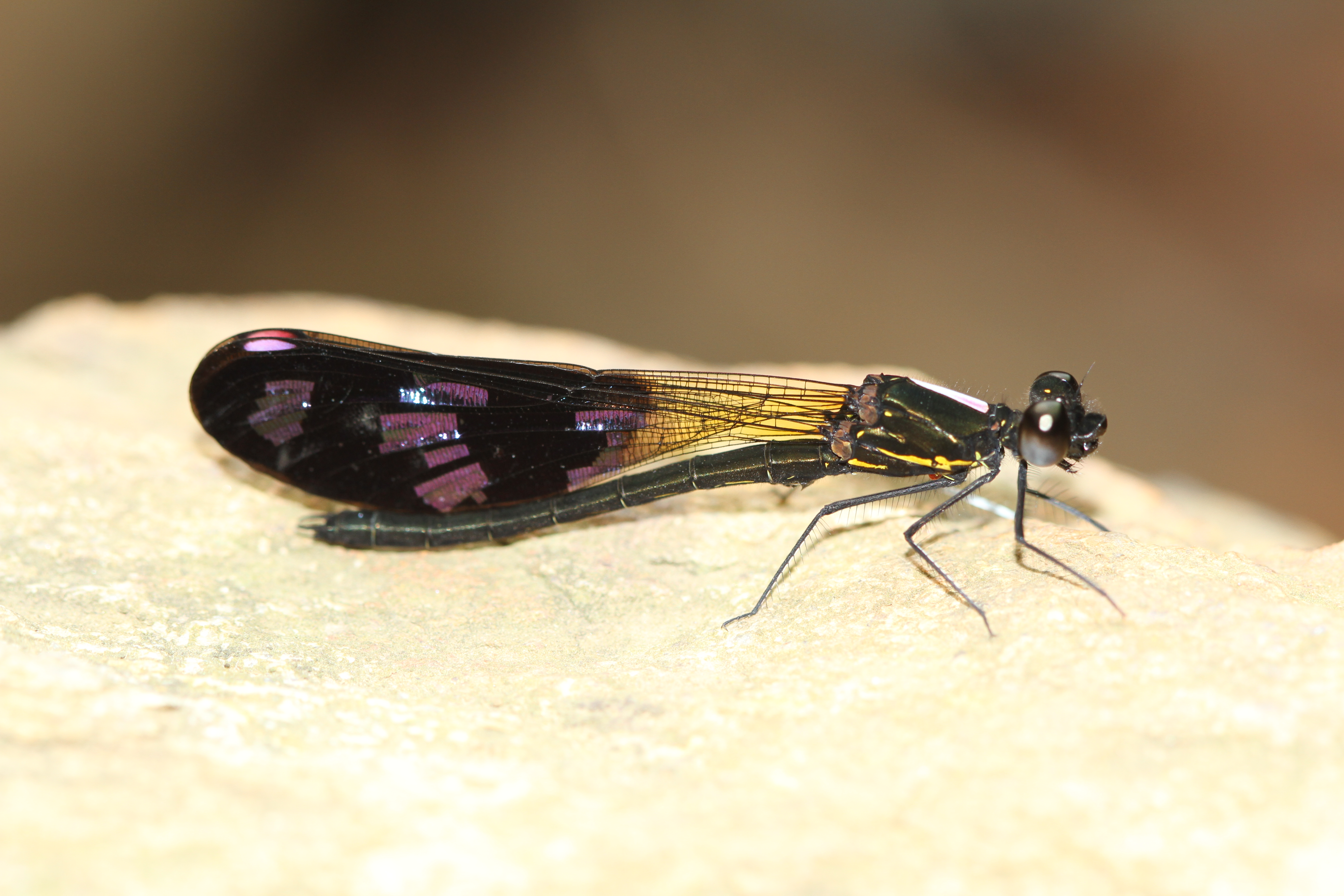
- Aristocypha spuria

Scientific classification
- Kingdom: Animalia
- Phylum: Arthropoda
- Clade: Pancrustacea
- Class: Insecta
- Order: Odonata
- Suborder: Zygoptera
- Superfamily: Calopterygoidea
- Family: Chlorocyphidae
- Genus: Aristocypha; Laidlaw, 1950

= Aristocypha =

Genus of damselflies

Aristocypha is a genus of damselflies in the family Chlorocyphidae, erected by Frank Fortescue Laidlaw in 1950. Species have mostly been recorded from the Indomalayan realm.

== Species ==
The following species are assigned to this genus:

1. Aristocypha aino Hämäläinen, Reels & Zhang, 2009
2. Aristocypha baibarana (Matsumura, 1931)
3. Aristocypha chaoi (Wilson, 2004)
4. Aristocypha cuneata (Selys, 1853)
5. Aristocypha fenestrella (Rambur, 1842)
6. Aristocypha fulgipennis (Guérin, 1831)
7. Aristocypha hilaryae (Fraser, 1927)
8. Aristocypha immaculata (Selys, 1879)
9. Aristocypha iridea (Selys, 1891)
10. Aristocypha quadrimaculata (Selys, 1853)
11. Aristocypha spuria (Selys, 1879)
12. Aristocypha trifasciata (Selys, 1853)
