= Potens =

Potens, a Latin word meaning powerful, confer potency, found in the word potentate, may refer to:

- Metriorhynchus potens, an extinct Late Jurassic metriorhynchid crocodile species
- Myolepta potens, a hoverfly species
- Psalodon potens, an extinct mammal species
- Purranisaurus potens, an extinct Late Jurassic metriorhynchid crocodile species
- Thylacinus potens, a prehistoric mammal species
- Titanophoneus potens, a prehistoric synapsid species
