= John Cowley (entomologist) =

English entomologist

John Cowley (1909–1967) was an English entomologist specializing on Odonata and Diptera. Born in Albourne, Sussex, he was elected a fellow of the Royal Entomological Society of London in 1931.
