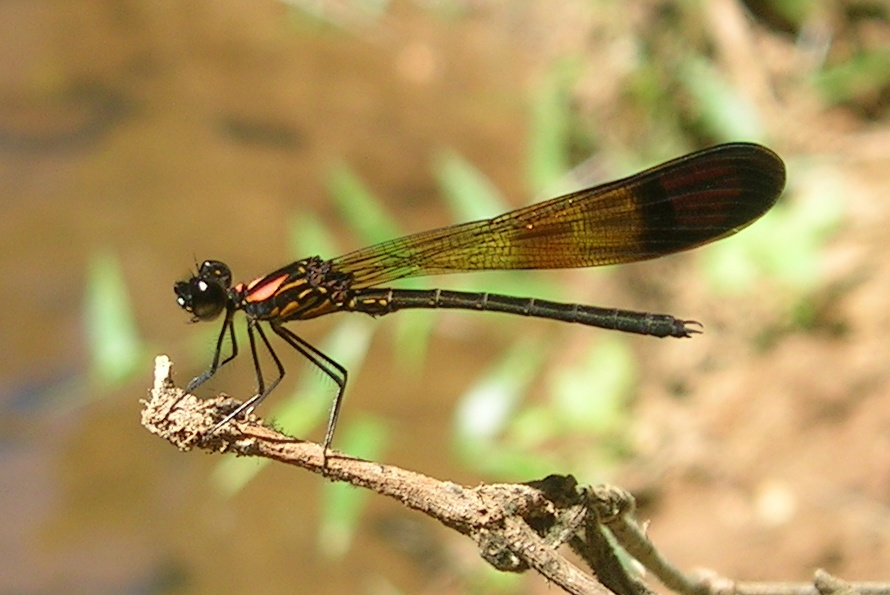
- Rhinocypha bisignata

Scientific classification
- Kingdom: Animalia
- Phylum: Arthropoda
- Clade: Pancrustacea
- Class: Insecta
- Order: Odonata
- Suborder: Zygoptera
- Superfamily: Calopterygoidea
- Family: Chlorocyphidae; Cowley, 1937

Subfamilies
- Chlorocyphinae; Cyranoinae; Indocyphinae; Libellagininae; Rhinocyphinae
- Distribution of Chlorocyphidae

= Chlorocyphidae =

Family of damselflies

Chlorocyphidae is a family of damselflies in the superfamily Calopterygoidea, commonly known as jewels or heliodors. Members of the family are typically small to medium-sized damselflies with brightly coloured bodies and often conspicuous wing markings. They inhabit forest streams and rivers throughout the Old World tropics, with their greatest diversity occurring in Southeast Asia.

Many species are noted for their metallic colours and elaborate courtship displays, with males using brightly coloured wings and body markings in territorial and mating behaviour. Chlorocyphidae is one of the most distinctive damselfly families and is consistently recovered as a monophyletic lineage in both morphological and molecular studies.

== Taxonomic history ==
In 1937 Cowley recognised Chlorocyphidae as a distinct family of damselflies and noted that many contemporary authors used the alternative name Libellaginidae for the same group. The family has long been regarded as a distinctive lineage of tropical stream-dwelling damselflies.

Morphological and molecular studies have consistently supported the monophyly of Chlorocyphidae. Modern classifications recognise approximately twenty genera distributed throughout the Old World tropics.

Although the family-group name Libellaginidae Bianchi, 1905 predates Chlorocyphidae under the principle of priority, the latter name has been used overwhelmingly in the scientific literature for much of the twentieth and twenty-first centuries. In 2013, Dijkstra and colleagues reported that Chlorocyphidae was preferred in almost 99% of published usage and recommended retaining it in the interests of nomenclatural stability.

In 2026, Fomekong-Lontchi and colleagues compared DNA from 90 species of jewel damselflies. They proposed dividing the family into six main groups, including two newly named subfamilies, Cyranoinae and Indocyphinae. They also described new genera and new species, and proposed re-grouping some existing species.

== Genera ==
The following genera are currently placed in Chlorocyphidae:

- Africocypha Pinhey, 1961
- Aristocypha Laidlaw, 1950
- Calocypha Fraser, 1928
- Chlorocypha Fraser, 1928
- Cyrano Needham & Gyger, 1939
- Disparocypha Ris, 1916
- Ebenocypha Fomekong-Lontchi, Kalkman & Bybee, 2026
- Heliocypha Fraser, 1949
- Heterocypha Laidlaw, 1950
- Indocypha Fraser, 1949
- Libellago Selys, 1840
- Platycypha Fraser, 1949
- Rhinocypha Rambur, 1842
- Scapanocypha Fomekong-Lontchi, Kalkman & Bybee, 2026
- Stenocypha Dijkstra, 2013
- Sundacypha Laidlaw, 1950

== Etymology ==
The family name Chlorocyphidae is derived from the type genus Chlorocypha, with the standard zoological suffix -idae used for animal families.

The genus name Chlorocypha was proposed by Fraser in 1928 as a replacement name during a discussion of the nomenclature of Micromerus and Libellago. Fraser did not explain the derivation of the name. It is probably derived from the Greek χλωρός (chlōros, "green" or "greenish-yellow"), a reference that may allude to the metallic coloration common in many members of the family, and cypha, a name element used in several damselfly genera.

== Gallery ==
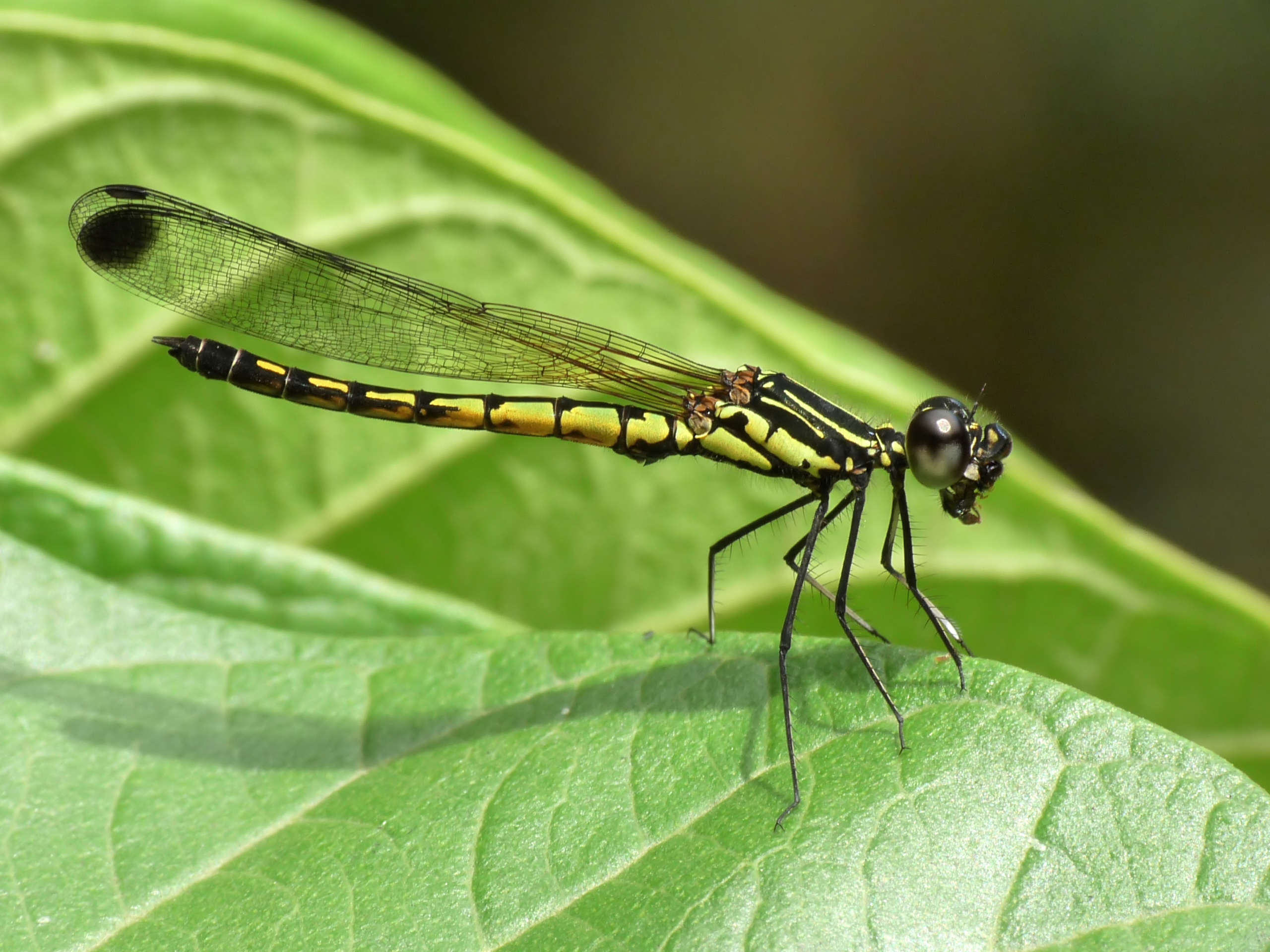
Libellago lineata, male

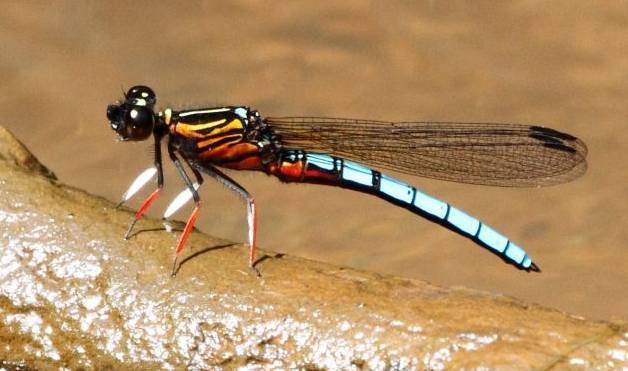
Platycypha caligata

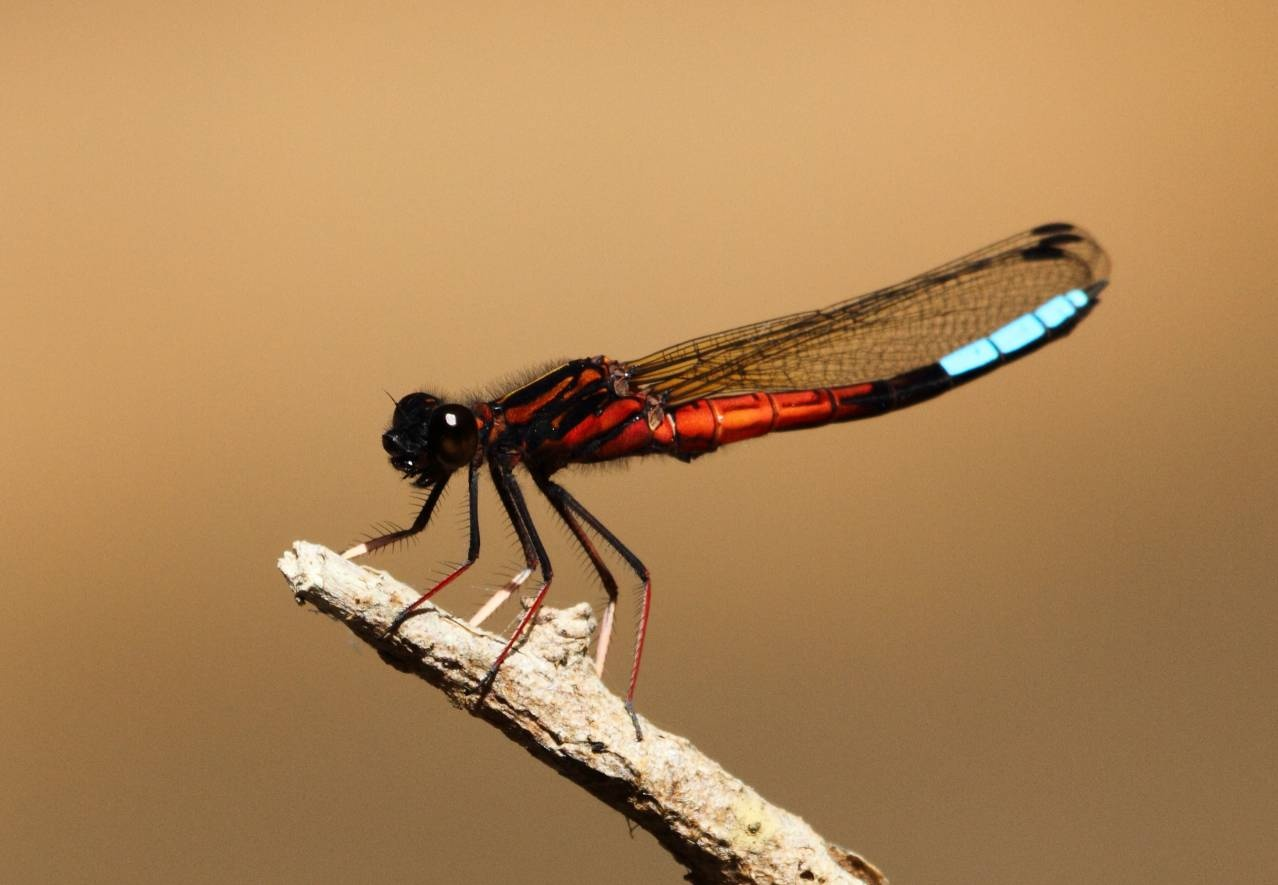
Platycypha fitzsimonsi

== See also ==
- List of damselflies of the world (Chlorocyphidae)
