= List of damselflies of the world (Chlorocyphidae) =

- Africocypha lacuselephantum
- Aristocypha fenestrella
- Calocypha laidlawi
- Chlorocypha aphrodite
- Chlorocypha cancellata
- Chlorocypha centripunctata
- Chlorocypha consueta
- Chlorocypha croceus
- Chlorocypha curta
- Chlorocypha cyanifrons
- Chlorocypha dahli
- Chlorocypha dispar
- Chlorocypha frigata
- Chlorocypha ghesquierei
- Chlorocypha glauca
- Chlorocypha grandis
- Chlorocypha helenae
- Chlorocypha hintzi
- Chlorocypha jacksoni
- Chlorocypha luminosa
- Chlorocypha molindica
- Chlorocypha mutans
- Chlorocypha neptunus
- Chlorocypha picta
- Chlorocypha rubida
- Chlorocypha rubriventris
- Chlorocypha schmidti
- Chlorocypha selysi
- Chlorocypha seydeli
- Chlorocypha sharpae
- Chlorocypha tenuis
- Chlorocypha trifaria
- Chlorocypha victoriae
- Chlorocypha wittei
- Cyrano angustior
- Cyrano unicolor
- Disparocypha biedermanni
- Indocypha leucoura
- Indocypha silvergliedi
- Indocypha svenhedini
- Indocypha vittata
- Libellago adami
- Libellago andamanensis
- Libellago asclepiades
- libellago aurantiaca
- Libellago balus
- Libellago bisignatus
- Libellago blanda
- Libellago celebensis
- Libellago daviesi
- Libellago dorsocyana
- Libellago finalis
- Libellago greeni
- Libellago hyalina
- Libellago manganitu
- Libellago miae
- Libellago mima
- Libellago naias
- Libellago orri
- Libellago phaethon
- Libellago rufescens
- Libellago semiopaca
- Libellago stictica
- Libellago stigmatizans
- Libellago sumatrana
- Libellago xanthocyana
- Melanocypha snellemanni
- Pachycypha aurea
- Platycypha amboniensis
- Platycypha auripes
- Platycypha caligata
- Platycypha fitzsimonsi
- Platycypha lacustris
- Platycypha picta
- Platycypha pinheyi
- Platycypha rufitibia
- Rhinocypha albistigma
- Rhinocypha angusta
- Rhinocypha arguta
- Rhinocypha aurea
- Rhinocypha aurofulgens
- Rhinocypha aurulenta
- Rhinocypha baibarana
- Rhinocypha bifasciata
- Rhinocypha biforata
- Rhinocypha biseriata
- Rhinocypha bisignata
- Rhinocypha cogauta
- Rhinocypha colorata
- Rhinocypha cucullata
- Rhinocypha cuneata
- Rhinocypha dorsosanguinea
- Rhinocypha drusilla
- Rhinocypha eximia
- Rhinocypha fenestraata
- Rhinocypha fenestrella
- Rhinocypha frontalis
- Rhinocypha fulgipennis
- Rhinocypha hageni
- Rhinocypha heterostigma
- Rhinocypha hilaryae
- Rhinocypha humeralis
- Rhinocypha ignipennis
- Rhinocypha immaculata
- Rhniocypha iridea
- Rhinocypha katherina
- Rhinocypha latimaculata
- Rhinocypha liberata
- Rhinocypha mariae
- Rhinocypha monochroa
- Rhinocypha moultoni
- Rhinocypha nubecula
- Rhinocypha ogasawarensis
- Rhinocypha pagenstecheri
- Rhinocypha pallidifrons
- Rhinocypha pelops
- Rhinocypha perforata
- Rhinocypha phantasma
- Rhinocypha quadrimaculata
- Rhinocypha sanguinolenta
- Rhinocypha seducta
- Rhinocypha selysi
- Rhinocypha spinifer
- Rhinocypha spuria
- Rhinocypha stygia
- Rhinocypha sumbana
- Rhinocypha tincta
- Rhinocypha trifasciata
- Rhinocypha trimaculata
- Rhinocypha turconii
- Rhinocypha uenoi
- Rhinocypha unimaculata
- Rhinocypha ustulata
- Rhinocypha viola
- Rhinocypha vitrinella
- Rhinocypha watsoni
- Rhinocypha xanthe
- Rhinoneura caerulea
- Rhinoneura villosipes
- Sclerocypha bisignata
- Sundacypha petiolata
- Sundacypha striata
- Watuwila vervoorti
