= Ruby jewel =

Ruby jewel may refer to:

- Ruby, a gemstone
- Jewel bearing, often made of synthetic ruby
- Chlorocypha consueta, a species of damselfly
