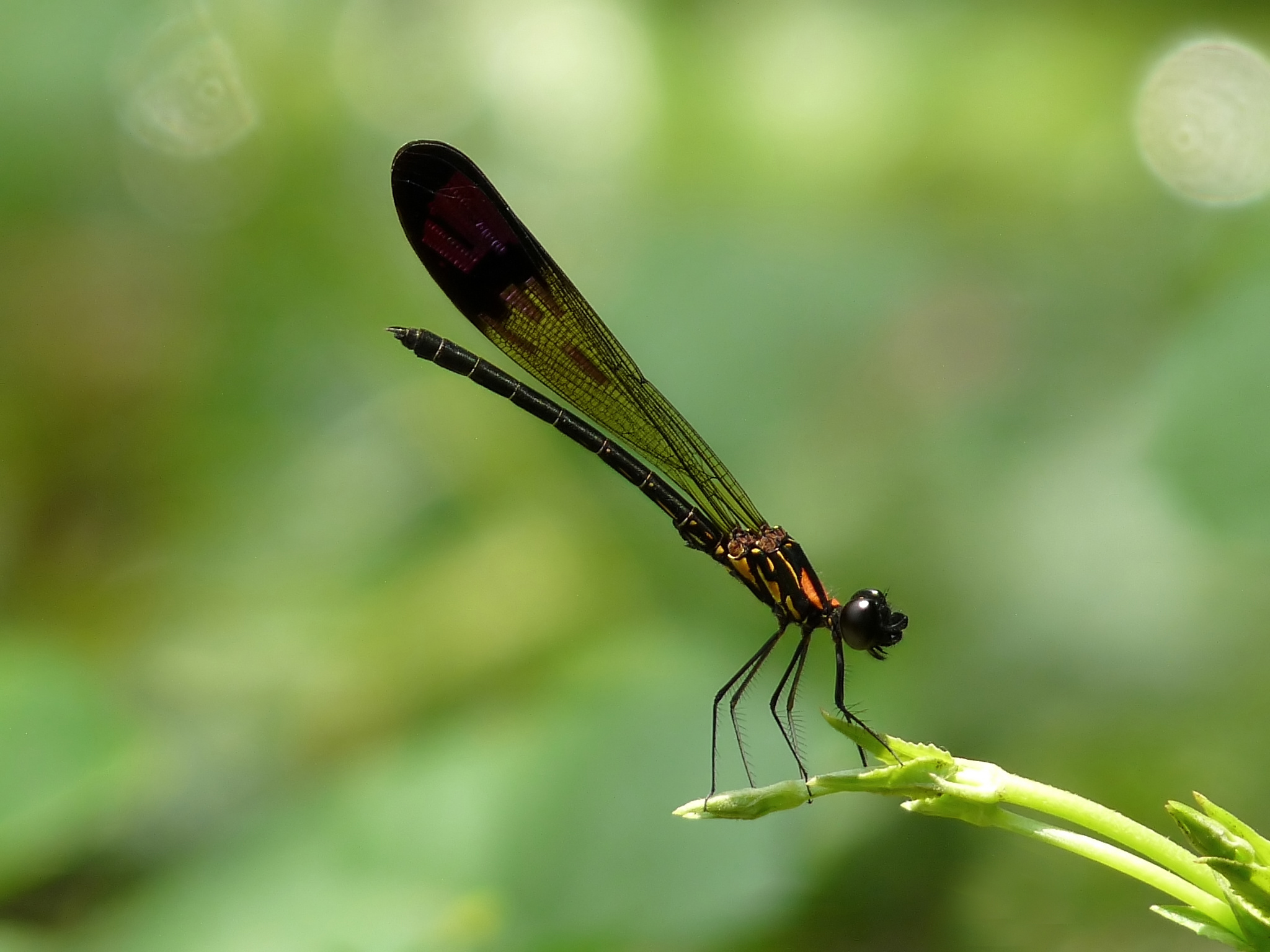
- Rhinocypha bisignata male
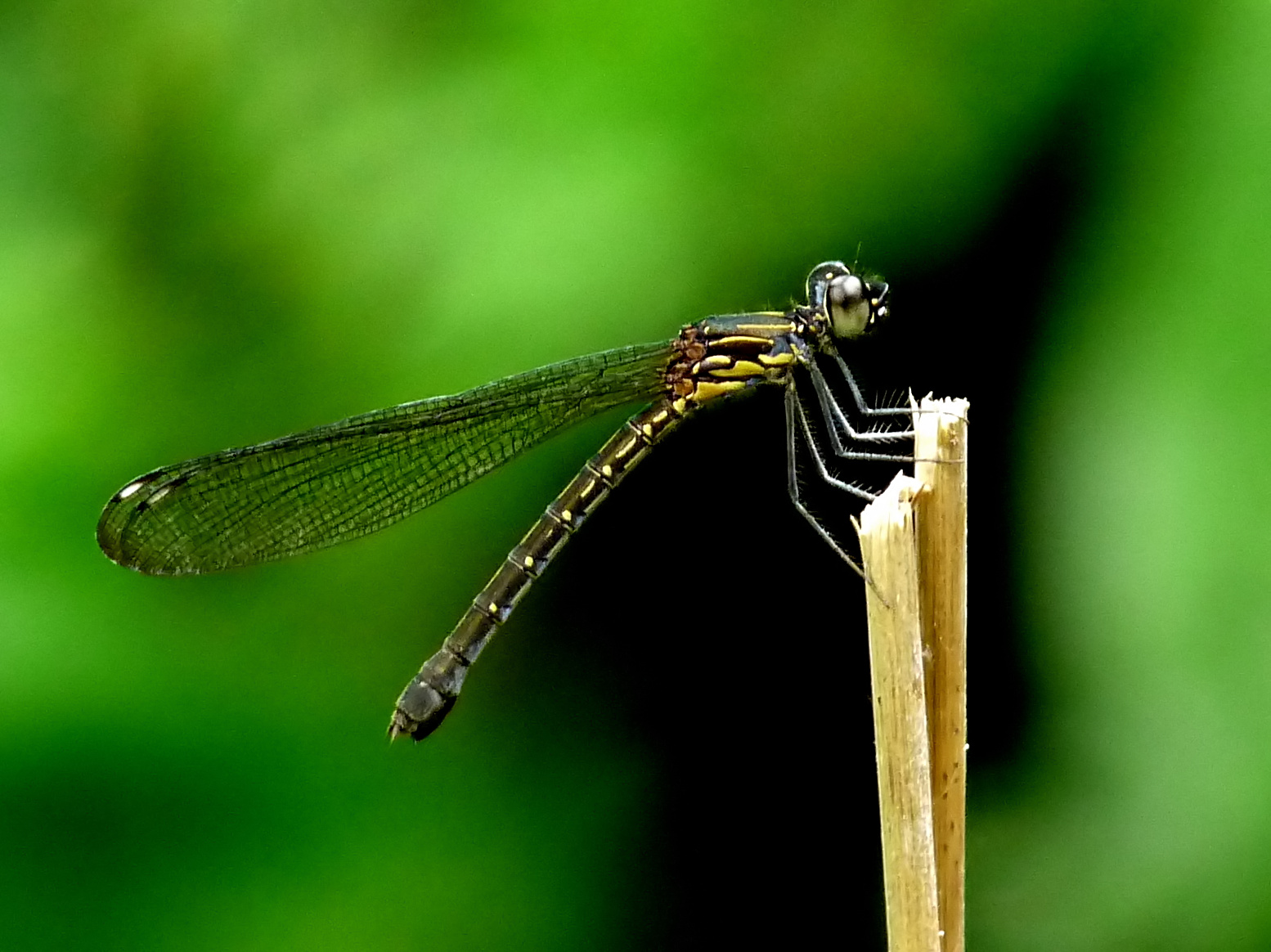
- Rhinocypha bisignata female

Scientific classification
- Kingdom: Animalia
- Phylum: Arthropoda
- Clade: Pancrustacea
- Class: Insecta
- Order: Odonata
- Suborder: Zygoptera
- Family: Chlorocyphidae
- Genus: Rhinocypha; Rambur, 1842

= Rhinocypha =

Genus of damselflies

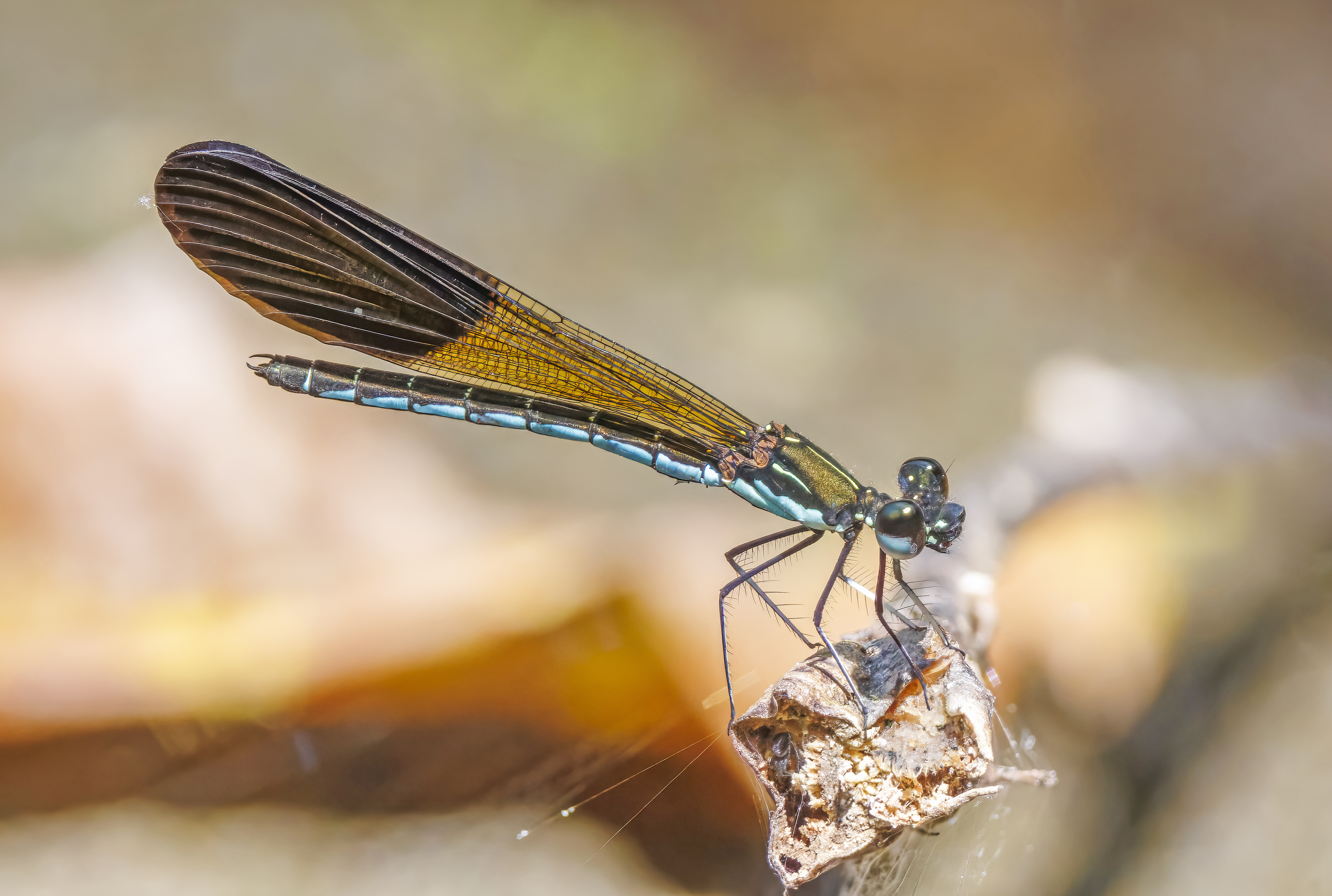
R. colorata male Luzon, Philippines

Rhinocypha is a genus of damselflies in the family Chlorocyphidae.

== Genera ==
The genus contains the following species:

- Rhinocypha albistigma Selys, 1873
- Rhinocypha angusta Hagen in Selys, 1853
- Rhinocypha anisoptera Selys, 1879
- Rhinocypha arguta Hämäläinen & Divasiri, 1997
- Rhinocypha aurea Hämäläinen & Karube, 2001
- Rhinocypha aurofulgens Laidlaw, 1931
- Rhinocypha aurulenta Förster, 1903
- Rhinocypha baibarana Matsumura, 1931
- Rhinocypha bifasciata Selys, 1879
- Rhinocypha biforata Selys, 1859
- Rhinocypha biseriata Selys, 1859
- Rhinocypha bisignata Hagen in Selys, 1853
- Rhinocypha chaoi Wilson, 2004
- Rhinocypha cognata Kimmins, 1936
- Rhinocypha colorata Selys, 1869
- Rhinocypha cucullata Selys, 1873
- Rhinocypha cuneata Selys, 1853
- Rhinocypha dorsosanguinea Lieftinck, 1961
- Rhinocypha drusilla Needham, 1930
- Rhinocypha eximia McLachlan in Selys, 1873
- Rhinocypha fenestrata (Burmeister, 1839)
- Rhinocypha fenestrella Rambur, 1842
- Rhinocypha frontalis Selys, 1873
- Rhinocypha fulgipennis (Guérin-Méneville, 1831)
- Rhinocypha hageni Krüger, 1898
- Rhinocypha heterostigma Rambur, 1842
- Rhinocypha hilaryae Fraser, 1927
- Rhinocypha humeralis Selys, 1873
- Rhinocypha ignipennis Selys, 1879
- Rhinocypha immaculata Selys, 1871
- Rhinocypha iridea Selys, 1891
- Rhinocypha katharina Needham, 1930
- Rhinocypha latimaculata Lieftinck, 1974
- Rhinocypha liberata Lieftinck, 1949
- Rhinocypha mariae Lieftinck, 1930
- Rhinocypha monochroa Selys, 1873
- Rhinocypha moultoni Laidlaw, 1915
- Rhinocypha nubecula Lieftinck, 1948
- Rhinocypha ogasawarensis Oguma, 1913
- Rhinocypha pagenstecheri Förster, 1897
- Rhinocypha pallidifrons Ris, 1927
- Rhinocypha pelops Laidlaw, 1936
- Rhinocypha perforata (Percheron, 1835) - Common Blue Jewel
- Rhinocypha phantasma Lieftinck, 1935
- Rhinocypha quadrimaculata Selys, 1853
- Rhinocypha sanguinolenta Lieftinck, 1961
- Rhinocypha seducta Hämäläinen & Karube, 2001
- Rhinocypha selysi Krüger, 1898
- Rhinocypha spinifer Laidlaw, 1931
- Rhinocypha spuria Selys, 1879
- Rhinocypha stygia Förster, 1897
- Rhinocypha sumbana Förster, 1897
- Rhinocypha tincta Rambur, 1842
- Rhinocypha trifasciata Selys, 1853
- Rhinocypha trimaculata Selys, 1853
- Rhinocypha turconii Selys, 1891
- Rhinocypha uenoi Asahina, 1964
- Rhinocypha unimaculata Selys, 1853
- Rhinocypha ustulata Kaup in Brauer, 1867
- Rhinocypha viola Orr, 2002
- Rhinocypha vitrinella Fraser, 1935
- Rhinocypha watsoni van Tol & Rozendaal, 1995
- Rhinocypha xanthe Ris, 1927
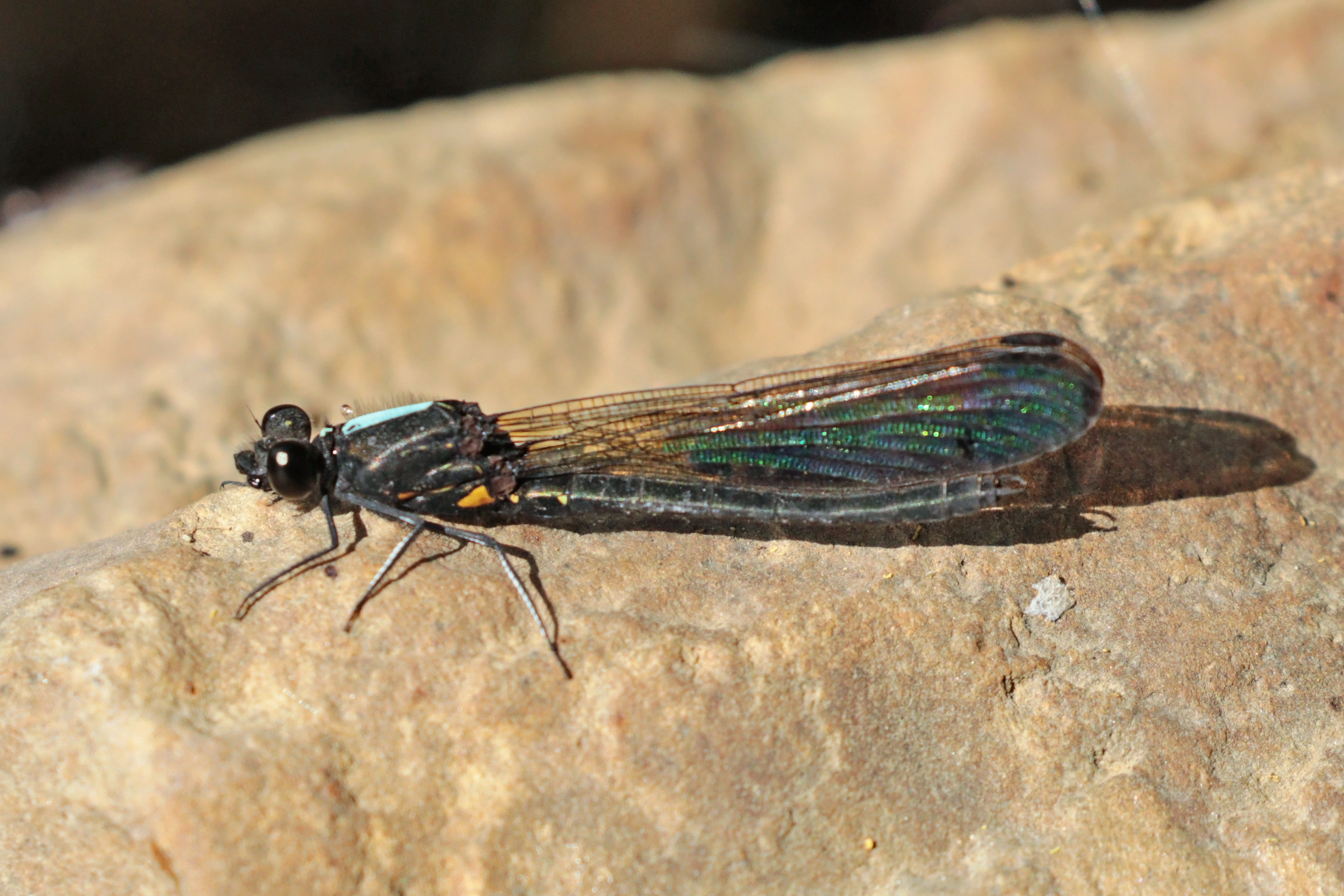
R. trifasciata male
Three-banded emerald jewel, Nepal

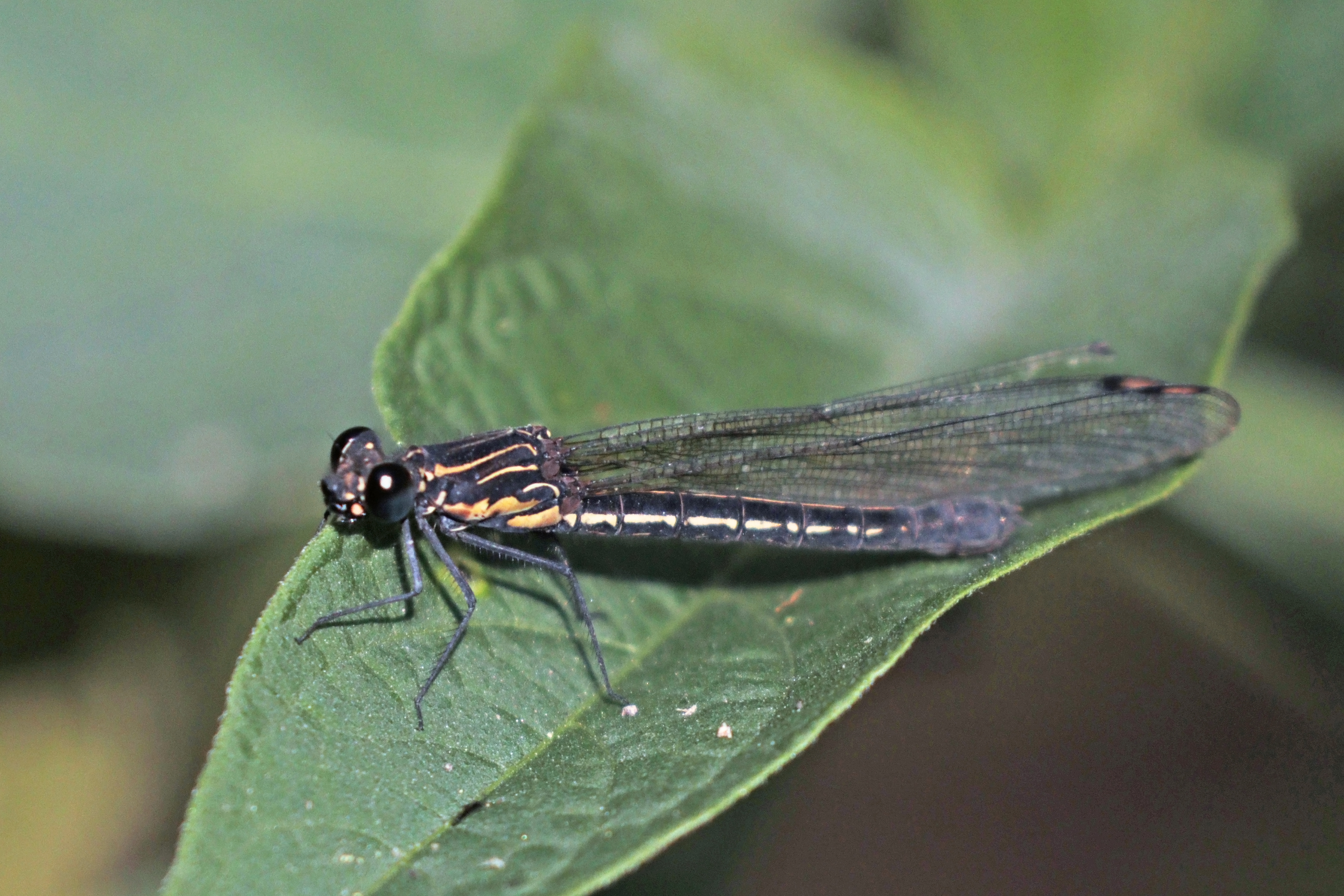
R. trifasciata female
Three-banded emerald jewel, Nepal

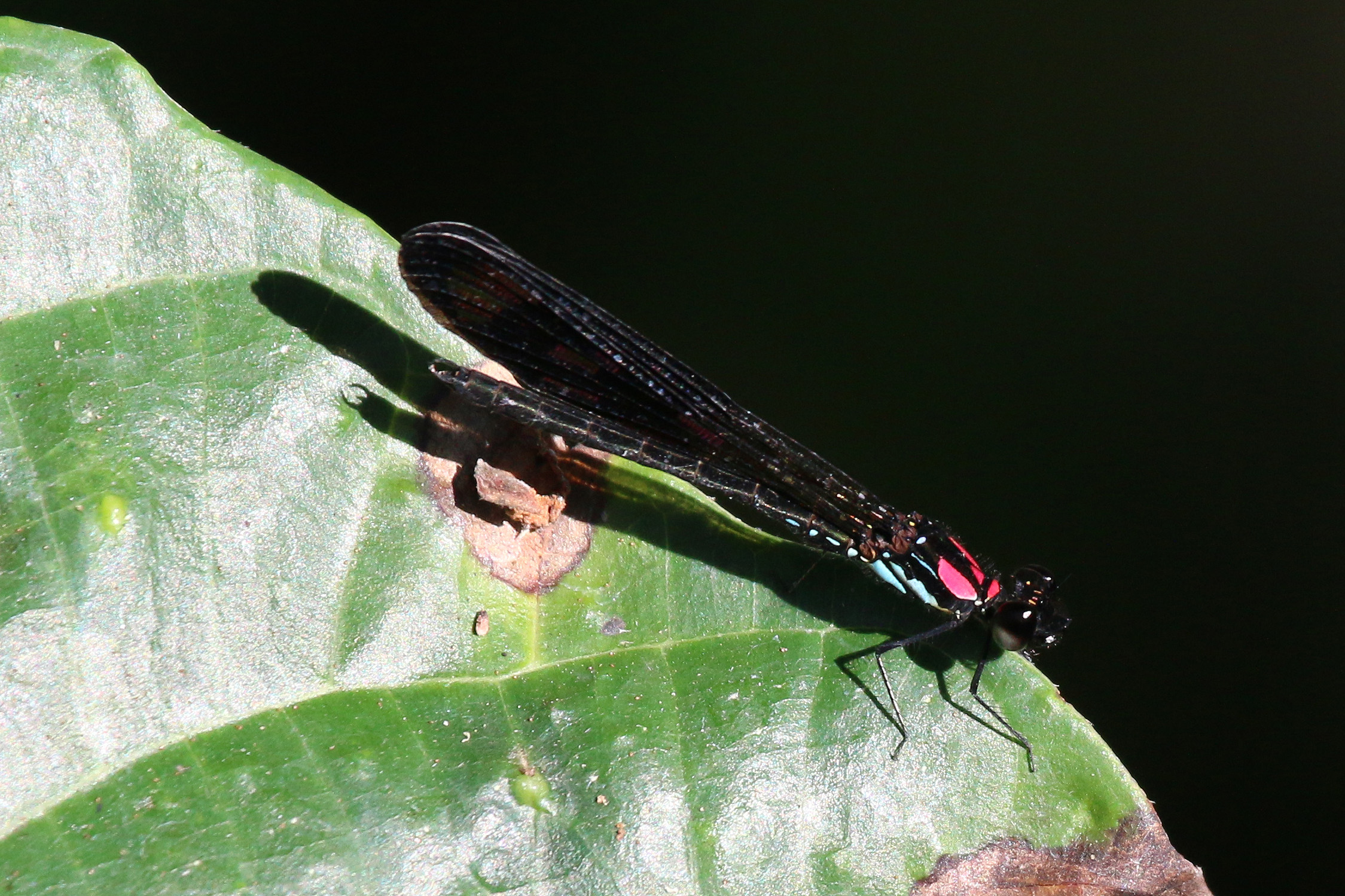
R. fenestrata male
Jewel, Bali, Indonesia
