= Chlorocypha radix =

Conservation status
- Least Concern (IUCN 3.1)

Scientific classification
- Kingdom: Animalia
- Phylum: Arthropoda
- Class: Insecta
- Order: Odonata
- Suborder: Zygoptera
- Family: Chlorocyphidae
- Genus: Chlorocypha
- Species: C. radix

Binomial name
- Chlorocypha radix Longfield, 1959

Species of damselfly

Chlorocypha radix is a species of jewel damselfly in the family Chlorocyphidae.

The IUCN conservation status of Chlorocypha radix is "LC", least concern, with no immediate threat to the species' survival. The IUCN status was reviewed in 2017.
