= Rhinoneura =

Scientific classification
- Kingdom: Animalia
- Phylum: Arthropoda
- Clade: Pancrustacea
- Class: Insecta
- Order: Odonata
- Suborder: Zygoptera
- Family: Chlorocyphidae
- Genus: Rhinoneura; Laidlaw, 1915

Genus of damselflies

Rhinoneura is a genus of damselflies in the family Chlorocyphidae. There are only two species in the genus, both believed to be occur only the highlands of north Borneo.

The genus contains the following species:

- Rhinoneura caerulea Kimmins, 1936
- Rhinoneura villosipes Laidlaw, 1915
