= Chlorocypha hasta =

Conservation status
- Data Deficient (IUCN 3.1)

Scientific classification
- Kingdom: Animalia
- Phylum: Arthropoda
- Class: Insecta
- Order: Odonata
- Suborder: Zygoptera
- Family: Chlorocyphidae
- Genus: Chlorocypha
- Species: C. hasta

Binomial name
- Chlorocypha hasta Pinhey, 1960

Species of damselfly

Chlorocypha hasta is a species of damselfly in family Chlorocyphidae. It is endemic to Tanzania.
