= Chlorocypha fabamacula =

Conservation status
- Least Concern (IUCN 3.1)

Scientific classification
- Kingdom: Animalia
- Phylum: Arthropoda
- Class: Insecta
- Order: Odonata
- Suborder: Zygoptera
- Family: Chlorocyphidae
- Genus: Chlorocypha
- Species: C. fabamacula

Binomial name
- Chlorocypha fabamacula Pinhey, 1961

Species of damselfly

Chlorocypha fabamacula is a species of jewel damselfly in the family Chlorocyphidae.

The IUCN conservation status of Chlorocypha fabamacula is "LC", least concern, with no immediate threat to the species' survival. The IUCN status was reviewed in 2018.
