= Platycypha bamptoni =

Conservation status
- Near Threatened (IUCN 3.1)

Scientific classification
- Domain: Eukaryota
- Kingdom: Animalia
- Phylum: Arthropoda
- Class: Insecta
- Order: Odonata
- Suborder: Zygoptera
- Family: Chlorocyphidae
- Genus: Platycypha
- Species: P. bamptoni

Binomial name
- Platycypha bamptoni (Pinhey, 1975)

Synonyms
- Chlorocypha bambtoni Pinhey, 1975; Chlorocypha bamptoni Pinhey, 1975; Chlorocypha crocea bambtoni Pinhey, 1975

Species of damselfly

Platycypha bamptoni is a species of jewel damselfly in the family Chlorocyphidae.

The IUCN conservation status of Platycypha bamptoni is "NT", near threatened. The species may be considered threatened in the near future. The IUCN status was assessed in 2006.
