= Chlorocypha frigida =

Conservation status
- Least Concern (IUCN 3.1)

Scientific classification
- Kingdom: Animalia
- Phylum: Arthropoda
- Class: Insecta
- Order: Odonata
- Suborder: Zygoptera
- Family: Chlorocyphidae
- Genus: Chlorocypha
- Species: C. frigida

Binomial name
- Chlorocypha frigida Pinhey, 1961

Species of damselfly

Chlorocypha frigida is a species of jewel damselfly in the family Chlorocyphidae.

The IUCN conservation status of Chlorocypha frigida is "LC", least concern, with no immediate threat to the species' survival. The IUCN status was reviewed in 2017.
