= Chlorocypha cancellata =

Conservation status
- Least Concern (IUCN 3.1)

Scientific classification
- Kingdom: Animalia
- Phylum: Arthropoda
- Class: Insecta
- Order: Odonata
- Suborder: Zygoptera
- Family: Chlorocyphidae
- Genus: Chlorocypha
- Species: C. cancellata

Binomial name
- Chlorocypha cancellata (Selys, 1879)

Species of damselfly

Chlorocypha cancellata is a species of damselfly in the family Chlorocyphidae. It is found in Cameroon, the Republic of the Congo, the Democratic Republic of the Congo, Equatorial Guinea, Gabon, Guinea, Nigeria, and Uganda. Its natural habitats are subtropical or tropical moist lowland forests and rivers.
