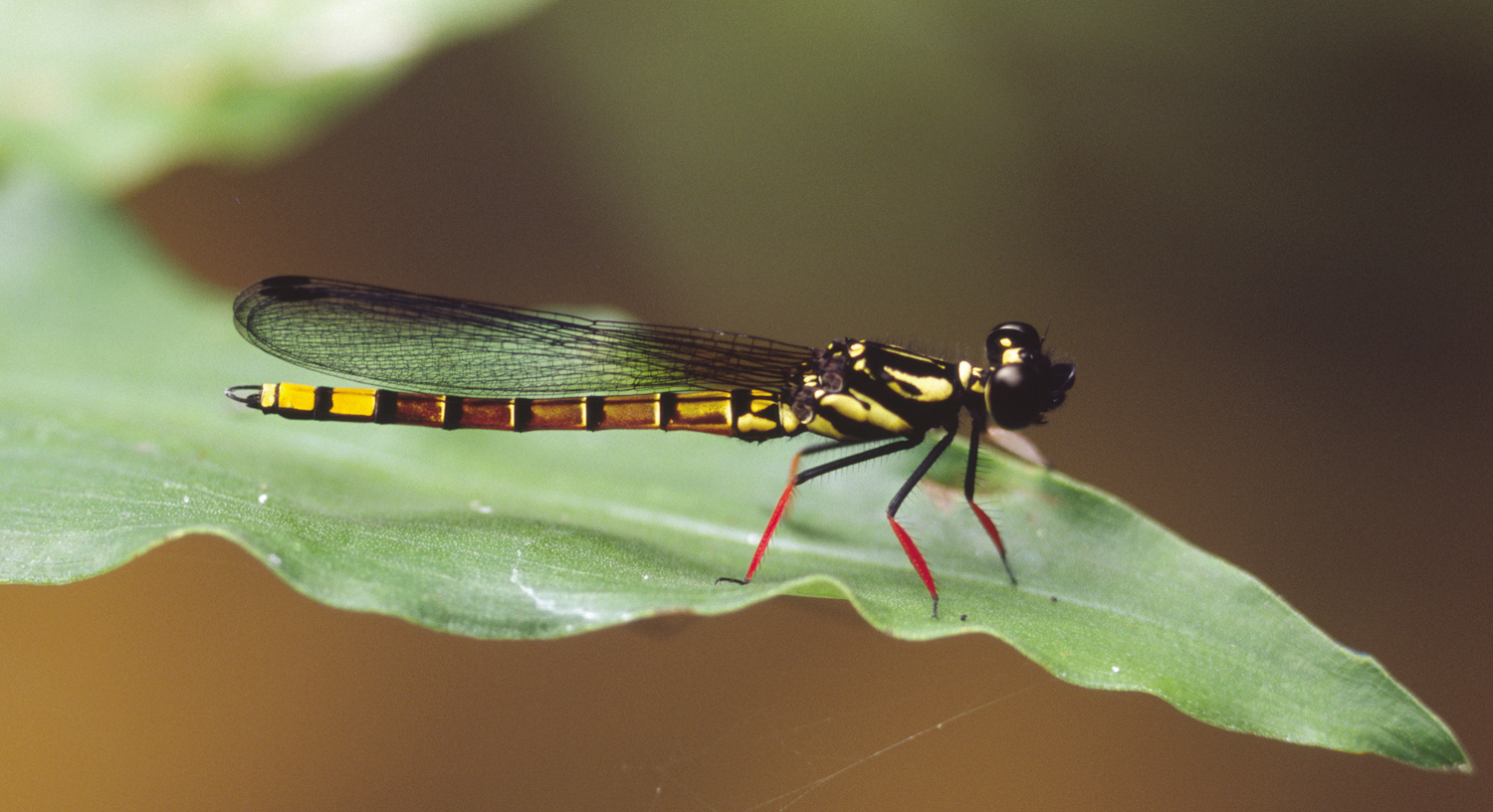
- Platycypha eliseva

Scientific classification
- Kingdom: Animalia
- Phylum: Arthropoda
- Clade: Pancrustacea
- Class: Insecta
- Order: Odonata
- Suborder: Zygoptera
- Family: Chlorocyphidae
- Genus: Platycypha; Fraser, 1949

= Platycypha =

Genus of damselflies

Platycypha is a genus of damselflies in the jewel damselfly family (Chlorocyphidae) from Sub-Saharan Africa.

== Species ==
The World Odonata List includes the following:

- Platycypha amboniensis (Martin, 1915) - Montane Dancing-jewel
- Platycypha angolensis Longfield, 1959 (Angola Dancing Jewel)
- Platycypha auripes (Förster, 1906) - Golden Dancing-jewel
- Platycypha bamptoni (Pinhey, 1975)
- Platycypha caligata (Selys, 1853) - Dancing Jewel
- Platycypha crocea (Longfield, 1947) (Angola Jewel)
- Platycypha eliseva Dijkstra, 2008 (Lucifer Jewel)
- Platycypha fitzsimonsi Pinhey, 1950 (Boulder Jewel)
- Platycypha inyangae Pinhey, 1958 (Inyanga Jewel)
- Platycypha lacustris (Förster, 1914) (Forest Jewel)
- Platycypha picta (Pinhey, 1962) (Petite Jewel)
- Platycypha pinheyi Fraser, 1950 (Tanganyika Jewel)
- Platycypha rubriventris (Pinhey, 1975) (Red-bellied Jewel)
- Platycypha rufitibia (Pinhey, 1961) - Red-booted Jewel
