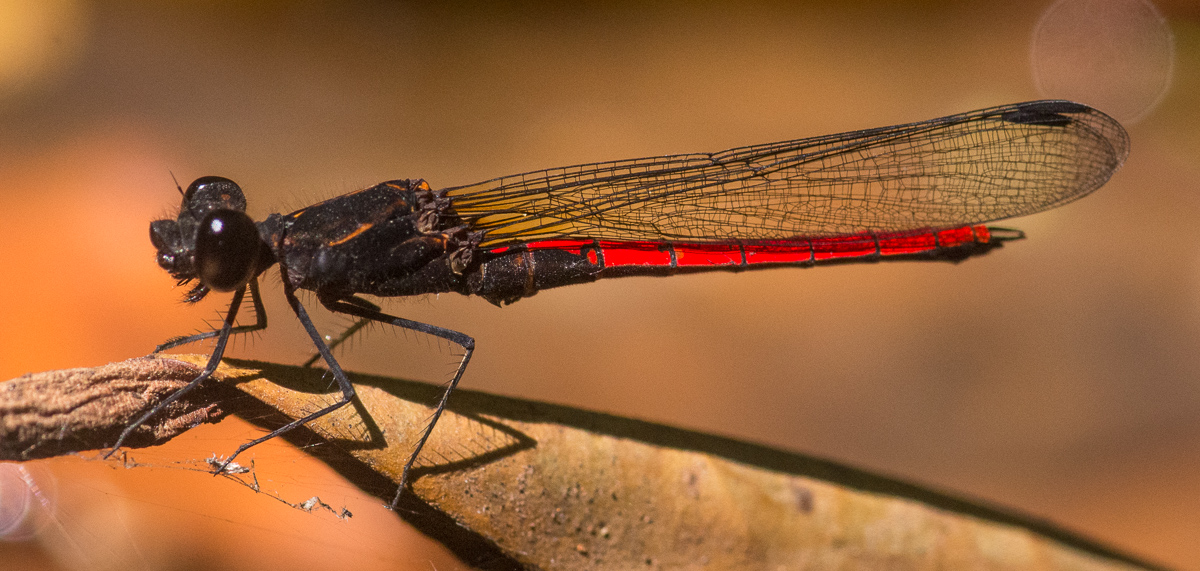
- Chlorocypha dispar

Scientific classification
- Kingdom: Animalia
- Phylum: Arthropoda
- Clade: Pancrustacea
- Class: Insecta
- Order: Odonata
- Suborder: Zygoptera
- Family: Chlorocyphidae
- Genus: Chlorocypha; Fraser, 1928

= Chlorocypha =

Genus of damselflies

Chlorocypha is a genus of damselflies in the family Chlorocyphidae.

== Species ==
The following species are currently placed in Chlorocypha:

- Chlorocypha aphrodite Le Roi, 1915
- Chlorocypha cancellata (Selys, 1879)
- Chlorocypha centripunctata Gambles, 1975 - giant jewel
- Chlorocypha consueta (Karsch, 1899) - ruby jewel, southern red jewel
- Chlorocypha croceus Longfield, 1947
- Chlorocypha curta (Hagen in Selys, 1853) - blue-tailed red jewel
- Chlorocypha cyanifrons (Selys, 1873)
- Chlorocypha dahli Fraser, 1956
- Chlorocypha dispar (Palisot de Beauvois, 1805) - small red jewel
- Chlorocypha fabamacula Pinhey, 1961
- Chlorocypha frigida Pinhey, 1961
- Chlorocypha ghesquierei Fraser, 1959
- Chlorocypha glauca (Selys, 1879) - eastern red-tipped jewel
- Chlorocypha grandis (Sjöstedt, 1899)
- Chlorocypha hasta Pinhey, 1960
- Chlorocypha helenae Legrand, 1984
- Chlorocypha hintzi (Grünberg, 1914)
- Chlorocypha jacksoni Pinhey, 1952
- Chlorocypha luminosa (Karsch, 1893) - orange jewel
- Chlorocypha molindica Fraser, 1948
- Chlorocypha mutans Legrand & Couturier, 1984
- Chlorocypha neptunus (Sjöstedt, 1899)
- Chlorocypha radix Longfield, 1959 - western red-tipped jewel
- Chlorocypha rubida (Hagen in Selys, 1853)
- Chlorocypha rubriventris Pinhey, 1975
- Chlorocypha schmidti Pinhey, 1967
- Chlorocypha selysi Karsch, 1899 - blue-nuzzled jewel
- Chlorocypha seydeli Fraser, 1958
- Chlorocypha sharpae Pinhey, 1972
- Chlorocypha tenuis Longfield, 1936
- Chlorocypha trifaria (Karsch, 1899) - Uganda red jewel
- Chlorocypha victoriae (Förster, 1914)
- Chlorocypha wittei Fraser, 1955

== Etymology ==
The genus name Chlorocypha was proposed by Fraser in 1928 as a replacement name during a discussion of the nomenclature of Micromerus and Libellago. Fraser did not explain the derivation of the name. It is probably derived from the Greek χλωρός (chlōros, "green" or "greenish-yellow"), a reference that may allude to the metallic coloration common in many members of the family.
