= Chlorocypha rubida =

Conservation status
- Least Concern (IUCN 3.1)

Scientific classification
- Kingdom: Animalia
- Phylum: Arthropoda
- Class: Insecta
- Order: Odonata
- Suborder: Zygoptera
- Family: Chlorocyphidae
- Genus: Chlorocypha
- Species: C. rubida

Binomial name
- Chlorocypha rubida (Hagen in Selys, 1853)

Species of damselfly

Chlorocypha rubida is a species of jewel damselfly in the family Chlorocyphidae.

The IUCN conservation status of Chlorocypha rubida is "LC", least concern, with no immediate threat to the species' survival. The IUCN status was reviewed in 2017.
