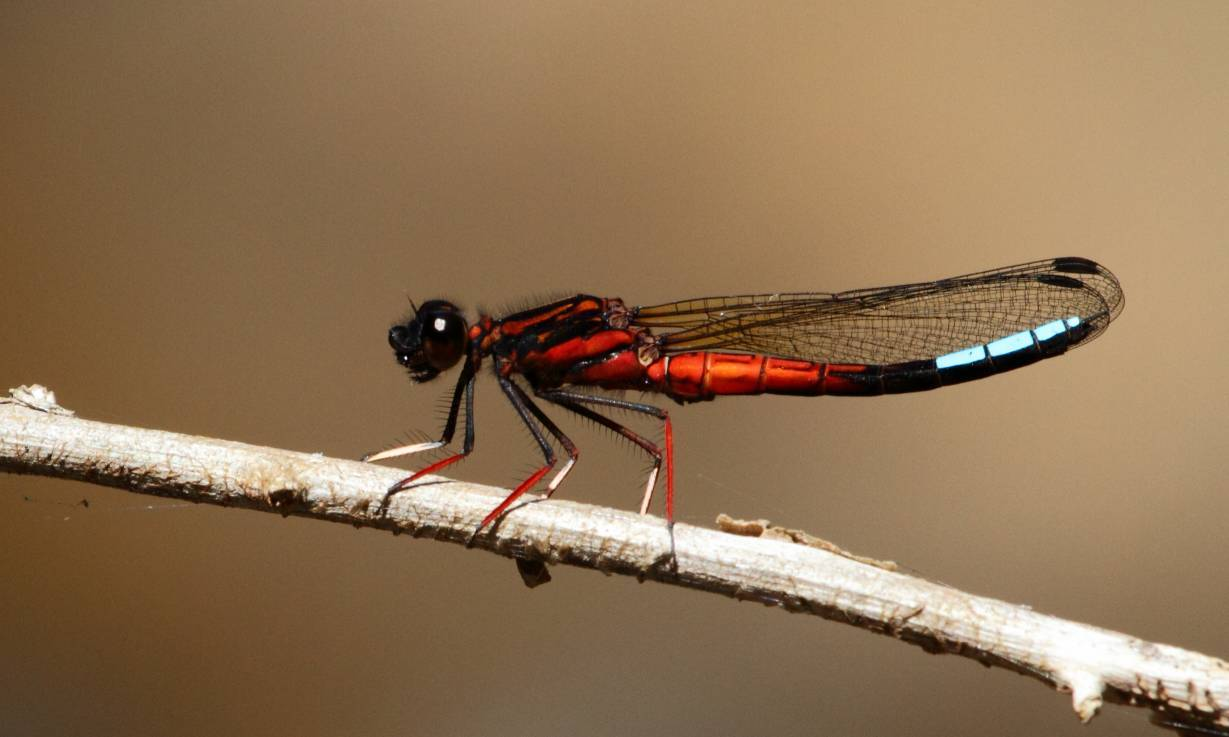
- Male

Conservation status
- Least Concern (IUCN 3.1)

Scientific classification
- Kingdom: Animalia
- Phylum: Arthropoda
- Class: Insecta
- Order: Odonata
- Suborder: Zygoptera
- Family: Chlorocyphidae
- Genus: Platycypha
- Species: P. fitzsimonsi

Binomial name
- Platycypha fitzsimonsi Pinhey, 1950

= Platycypha fitzsimonsi =

Species of damselfly

Platycypha fitzsimonsi, the boulder jewel or Fitzsimon's jewel is a species of damselfly in the family Chlorocyphidae. It is endemic to South Africa where its natural habitats include wooded and forested streams and rivers.

This is a fairly small species; 29–34 mm long with a wingspan of 46–54 mm. The mature male has an orange-red and black striped thorax and a distinctive red, black and blue abdomen. Females and immature males are dark brown and khaki.

Like several other Chlocyphidae, males extend and vibrate their tibia displaying the white colouration (foot waggling) towards ovipositing females as a courtship display.

== Gallery ==
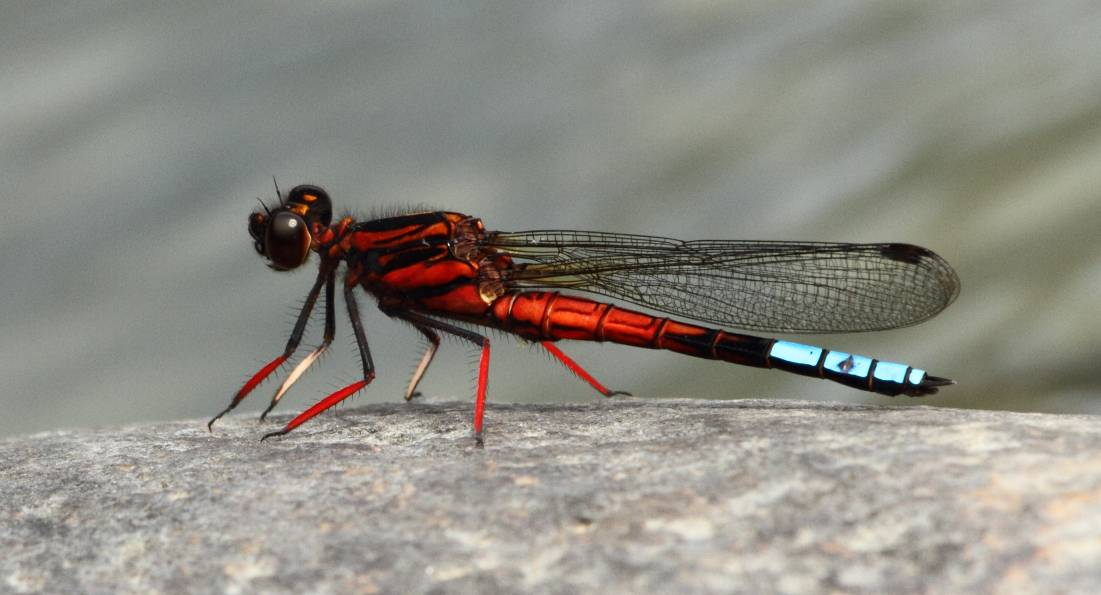
Male

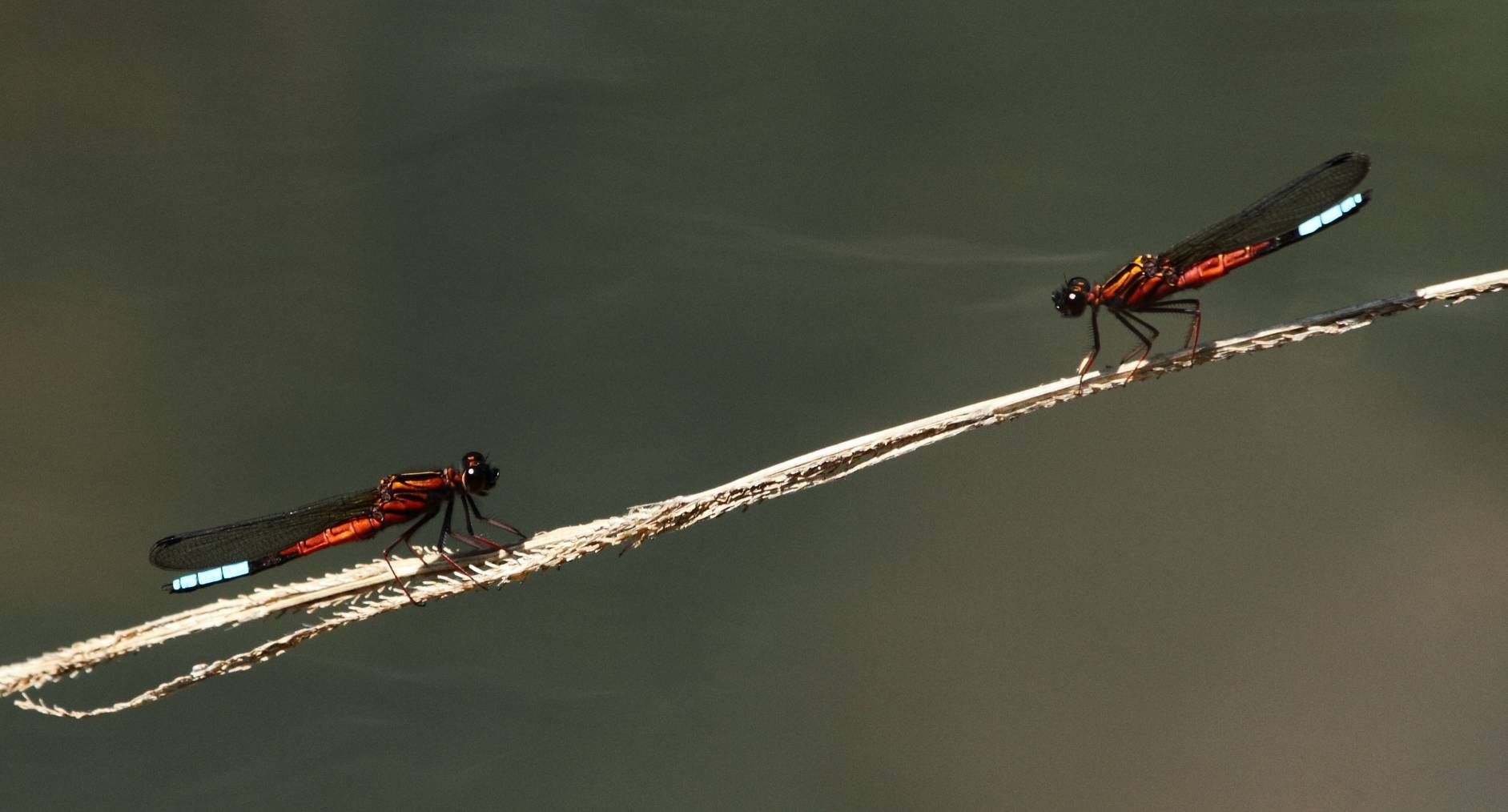
Males

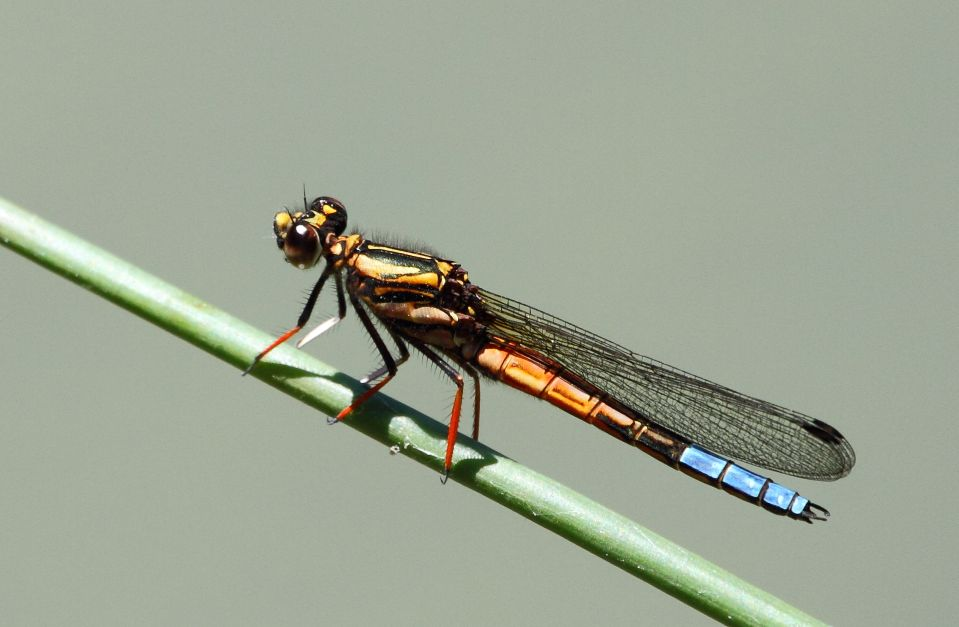
Immature male

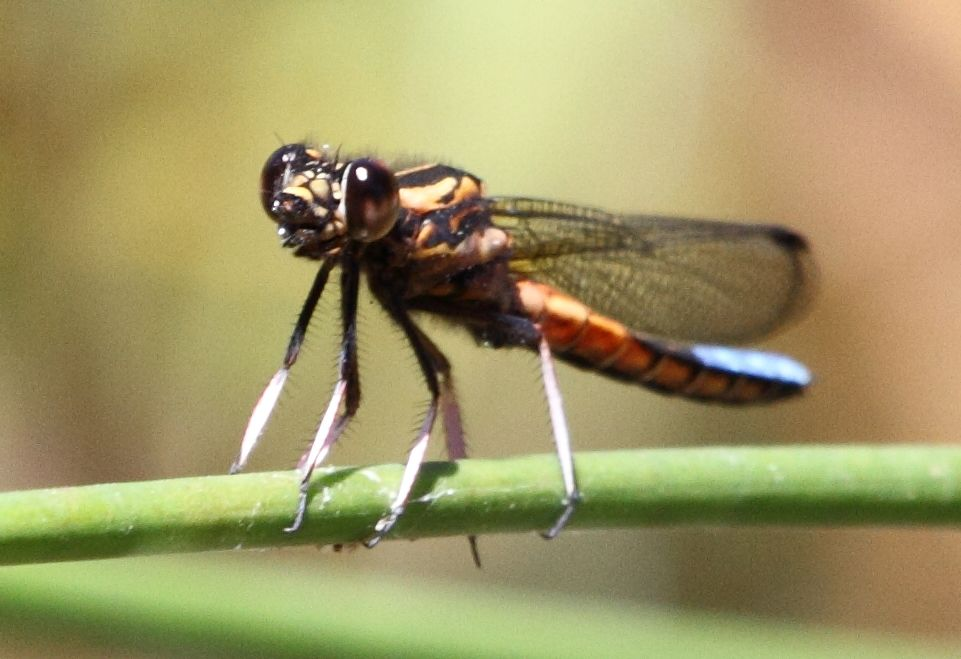
Immature male
