= Platycypha auripes =

Conservation status
- Endangered (IUCN 3.1)

Scientific classification
- Kingdom: Animalia
- Phylum: Arthropoda
- Class: Insecta
- Order: Odonata
- Suborder: Zygoptera
- Family: Chlorocyphidae
- Genus: Platycypha
- Species: P. auripes

Binomial name
- Platycypha auripes (Förster, 1906)

Species of damselfly

Platycypha auripes, also known as Tanzania jewel, is a species of damselfly in the family Chlorocyphidae. It is endemic to the Eastern Arc Mountains in Tanzania. It occurs in and around forest streams. Classified as endangered by the IUCN, it is threatened by habitat loss caused by agriculture and wood extraction.
