= Chlorocypha rubriventris =

Scientific classification
- Domain: Eukaryota
- Kingdom: Animalia
- Phylum: Arthropoda
- Class: Insecta
- Order: Odonata
- Suborder: Zygoptera
- Family: Chlorocyphidae
- Genus: Chlorocypha
- Species: C. rubriventris

Binomial name
- Chlorocypha rubriventris Pinhey, 1975

Species of damselfly

Chlorocypha rubriventris is a species of jewel damselfly in the family Chlorocyphidae.
