= Platycypha lacustris =

Conservation status
- Least Concern (IUCN 3.1)

Scientific classification
- Kingdom: Animalia
- Phylum: Arthropoda
- Class: Insecta
- Order: Odonata
- Suborder: Zygoptera
- Family: Chlorocyphidae
- Genus: Platycypha
- Species: P. lacustris

Binomial name
- Platycypha lacustris (Förster, 1914)

Species of damselfly

Platycypha lacustris, also known as forest jewel, is a species of damselfly in the family Chlorocyphidae. It is found in forest of Sub-Saharan Africa in Cameroon, the Democratic Republic of the Congo, Kenya, Tanzania, Uganda, and Zambia. Its lives around rainforest streams. It is a widespread species that can be threatened by habitat loss.
