= Chlorocypha glauca =

Conservation status
- Least Concern (IUCN 3.1)

Scientific classification
- Kingdom: Animalia
- Phylum: Arthropoda
- Class: Insecta
- Order: Odonata
- Suborder: Zygoptera
- Family: Chlorocyphidae
- Genus: Chlorocypha
- Species: C. glauca

Binomial name
- Chlorocypha glauca (Selys, 1879)

Species of damselfly

Chlorocypha glauca is a species of jewel damselfly in the family Chlorocyphidae.

The IUCN conservation status of Chlorocypha glauca is "LC", least concern, with no immediate threat to the species' survival. The IUCN status was reviewed in 2010.
