= Chlorocypha dahli =

Conservation status
- Data Deficient (IUCN 3.1)

Scientific classification
- Kingdom: Animalia
- Phylum: Arthropoda
- Class: Insecta
- Order: Odonata
- Suborder: Zygoptera
- Family: Chlorocyphidae
- Genus: Chlorocypha
- Species: C. dahli

Binomial name
- Chlorocypha dahli Fraser, 1956

Species of damselfly

Chlorocypha dahli is a species of jewel damselfly in the family Chlorocyphidae.
