= Rhinoneura villosipes =

Conservation status
- Vulnerable (IUCN 3.1)

Scientific classification
- Kingdom: Animalia
- Phylum: Arthropoda
- Class: Insecta
- Order: Odonata
- Suborder: Zygoptera
- Family: Chlorocyphidae
- Genus: Rhinoneura
- Species: R. villosipes

Binomial name
- Rhinoneura villosipes Laidlaw, 1915

Species of damselfly

Rhinoneura villosipes is a species of jewel damselfly in the family Chlorocyphidae.

The IUCN conservation status of Rhinoneura villosipes is "VU", vulnerable. The species faces a high risk of endangerment in the medium term.
