= Chlorocypha neptunus =

Conservation status
- Vulnerable (IUCN 3.1)

Scientific classification
- Kingdom: Animalia
- Phylum: Arthropoda
- Class: Insecta
- Order: Odonata
- Suborder: Zygoptera
- Family: Chlorocyphidae
- Genus: Chlorocypha
- Species: C. neptunus

Binomial name
- Chlorocypha neptunus (Sjöstedt, 1899)

Species of damselfly

Chlorocypha neptunus is a species of jewel damselfly in the family Chlorocyphidae.

The IUCN conservation status of Chlorocypha neptunus is "VU", vulnerable. The species faces a high risk of endangerment in the medium term. The IUCN status was reviewed in 2018.
