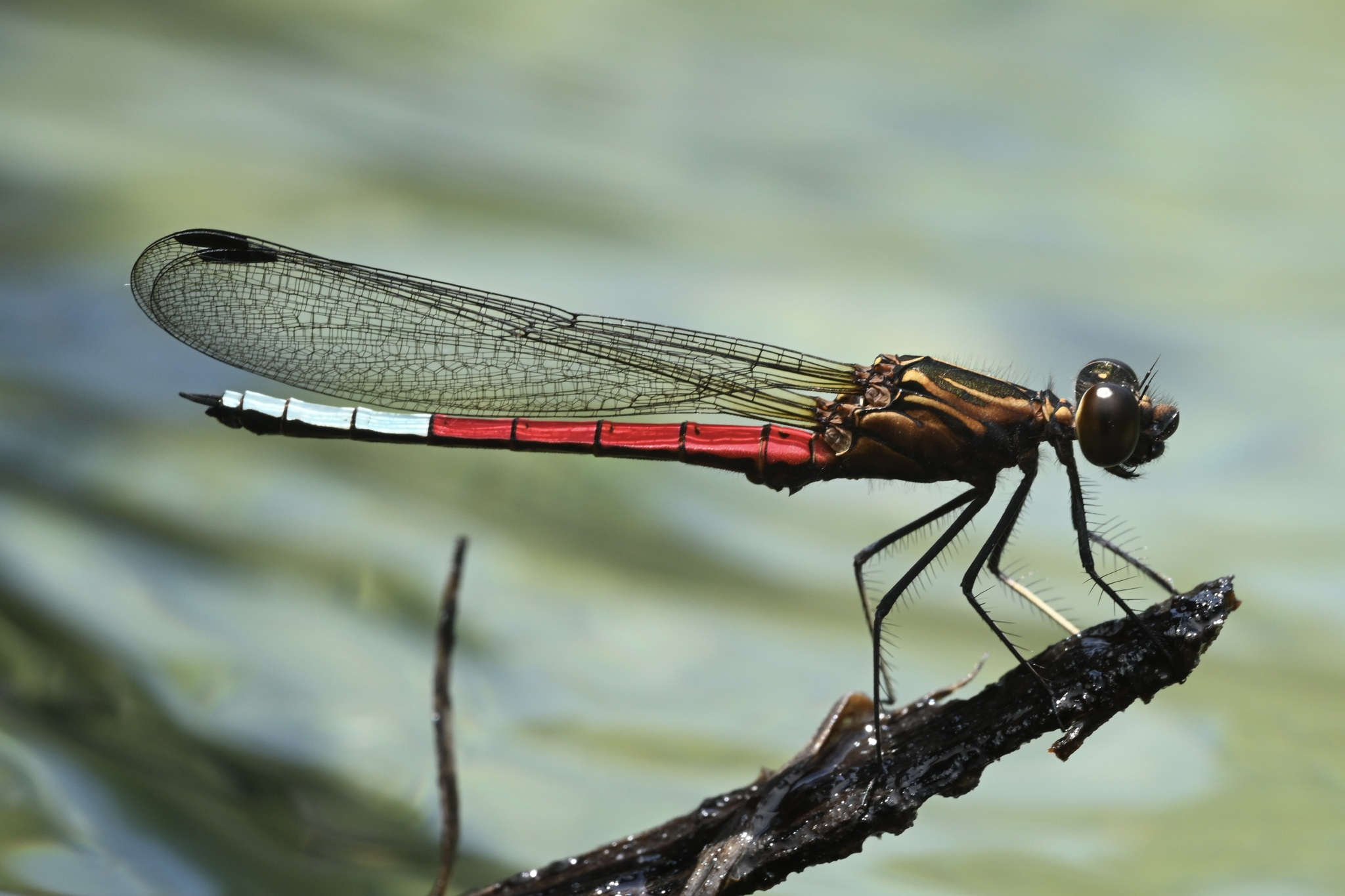
- Male in Angola

Conservation status
- Least Concern (IUCN 3.1)

Scientific classification
- Kingdom: Animalia
- Phylum: Arthropoda
- Clade: Pancrustacea
- Class: Insecta
- Order: Odonata
- Suborder: Zygoptera
- Family: Chlorocyphidae
- Genus: Chlorocypha
- Species: C. curta

Binomial name
- Chlorocypha curta (Hagen in Selys, 1853)

= Chlorocypha curta =

Species of damselfly

Chlorocypha curta is a species of damselfly in the family Chlorocyphidae. It is found in Burkina Faso, Cameroon, Central African Republic, Ivory Coast, Equatorial Guinea, Ghana, Guinea, Kenya, Liberia, Nigeria, Sierra Leone, Sudan, Togo, and Uganda. Its natural habitats are subtropical or tropical moist lowland forests and rivers.
