= Rhinocypha latimacula =

Conservation status
- Endangered (IUCN 3.1)

Scientific classification
- Kingdom: Animalia
- Phylum: Arthropoda
- Clade: Pancrustacea
- Class: Insecta
- Order: Odonata
- Suborder: Zygoptera
- Family: Chlorocyphidae
- Genus: Rhinocypha
- Species: R. latimacula

Binomial name
- Rhinocypha latimacula Lieftinck, 1974

Synonyms
- Rhinocypha latimaculata Lieftinck, 1974 [orth. error]

Species of damselfly

Rhinocypha latimacula is a species of damselfly in the family Chlorocyphidae. It is endemic to the Philippines. Its natural habitat is rivers. It is threatened by habitat loss.
