= Chlorocypha molindica =

Conservation status
- Near Threatened (IUCN 3.1)

Scientific classification
- Kingdom: Animalia
- Phylum: Arthropoda
- Class: Insecta
- Order: Odonata
- Suborder: Zygoptera
- Family: Chlorocyphidae
- Genus: Chlorocypha
- Species: C. molindica

Binomial name
- Chlorocypha molindica Fraser, 1948

Species of damselfly

Chlorocypha molindica is a species of damselfly in the family Chlorocyphidae. It is found in Burundi, the Republic of the Congo, the Democratic Republic of the Congo, Rwanda, and Uganda. Its natural habitats are subtropical or tropical moist lowland forests, subtropical or tropical moist montane forests, and rivers.
