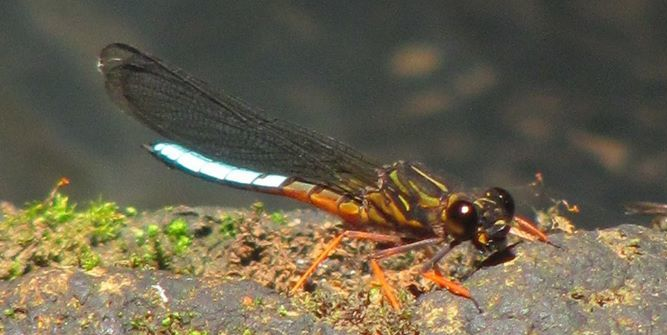
- Platycypha amboniensis in Kenya

Conservation status
- Critically Endangered (IUCN 3.1)

Scientific classification
- Kingdom: Animalia
- Phylum: Arthropoda
- Class: Insecta
- Order: Odonata
- Suborder: Zygoptera
- Family: Chlorocyphidae
- Genus: Platycypha
- Species: P. amboniensis

Binomial name
- Platycypha amboniensis (Martin, 1915)

= Platycypha amboniensis =

Species of damselfly

Platycypha amboniensis is a species of damselfly in the family Chlorocyphidae. It is endemic to Kenya. Its natural habitats are subtropical or tropical moist montane forests and rivers. It is threatened by habitat loss.
