= Rhinocypha ogasawarensis =

Conservation status
- Endangered (IUCN 3.1)

Scientific classification
- Kingdom: Animalia
- Phylum: Arthropoda
- Class: Insecta
- Order: Odonata
- Suborder: Zygoptera
- Family: Chlorocyphidae
- Genus: Rhinocypha
- Species: R. ogasawarensis

Binomial name
- Rhinocypha ogasawarensis Oguma, 1913

Species of damselfly

Rhinocypha ogasawarensis is a species of damselfly in the family Chlorocyphidae. It is endemic to Japan.
