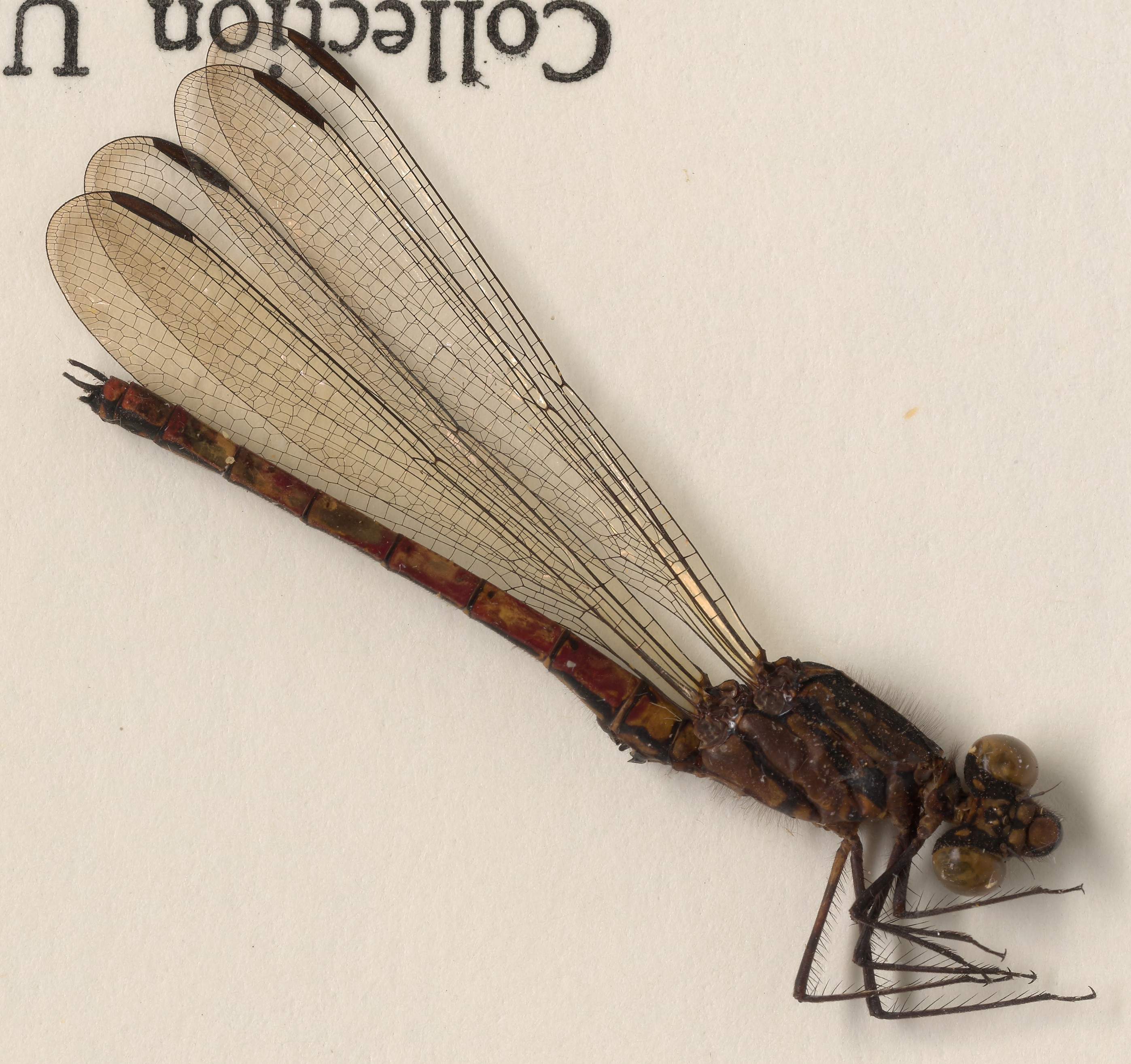

Conservation status
- Least Concern (IUCN 3.1)

Scientific classification
- Kingdom: Animalia
- Phylum: Arthropoda
- Class: Insecta
- Order: Odonata
- Suborder: Zygoptera
- Family: Chlorocyphidae
- Genus: Chlorocypha
- Species: C. wittei

Binomial name
- Chlorocypha wittei Fraser, 1955

= Chlorocypha wittei =

Species of damselfly

Chlorocypha wittei is a species of jewel damselfly in the family Chlorocyphidae.

The IUCN conservation status of Chlorocypha wittei is "LC", least concern, with no immediate threat to the species' survival. The IUCN status was reviewed in 2017.
