= Platycypha pinheyi =

Conservation status
- Near Threatened (IUCN 3.1)

Scientific classification
- Kingdom: Animalia
- Phylum: Arthropoda
- Class: Insecta
- Order: Odonata
- Suborder: Zygoptera
- Family: Chlorocyphidae
- Genus: Platycypha
- Species: P. pinheyi

Binomial name
- Platycypha pinheyi Fraser, 1950

Species of damselfly

Platycypha pinheyi is a species of damselfly in the family Chlorocyphidae. It is found along the shores of Lake Tanganyika in the Democratic Republic of the Congo, Tanzania, and Zambia.
