= Chlorocypha dispar =

Conservation status
- Least Concern (IUCN 3.1)

Scientific classification
- Kingdom: Animalia
- Phylum: Arthropoda
- Class: Insecta
- Order: Odonata
- Suborder: Zygoptera
- Family: Chlorocyphidae
- Genus: Chlorocypha
- Species: C. dispar

Binomial name
- Chlorocypha dispar (Palisot de Beauvois, 1807)

Species of damselfly

Chlorocypha dispar is a species of jewel damselfly in the family Chlorocyphidae.

The IUCN conservation status of Chlorocypha dispar is "LC", least concern, with no immediate threat to the species' survival. The IUCN status was reviewed in 2018.
