= Chlorocypha selysi =

Conservation status
- Least Concern (IUCN 3.1)

Scientific classification
- Kingdom: Animalia
- Phylum: Arthropoda
- Class: Insecta
- Order: Odonata
- Suborder: Zygoptera
- Family: Chlorocyphidae
- Genus: Chlorocypha
- Species: C. selysi

Binomial name
- Chlorocypha selysi (Karsch, 1899)

Species of damselfly

Chlorocypha selysi is a species of jewel damselfly in the family Chlorocyphidae.

The IUCN conservation status of Chlorocypha selysi is "LC", least concern, with no immediate threat to the species' survival. The IUCN status was reviewed in 2018.

== Subspecies ==
These two subspecies belong to the species Chlorocypha selysi:

- Chlorocypha selysi nigeriensis Gambles, 1975
- Chlorocypha selysi selysi
