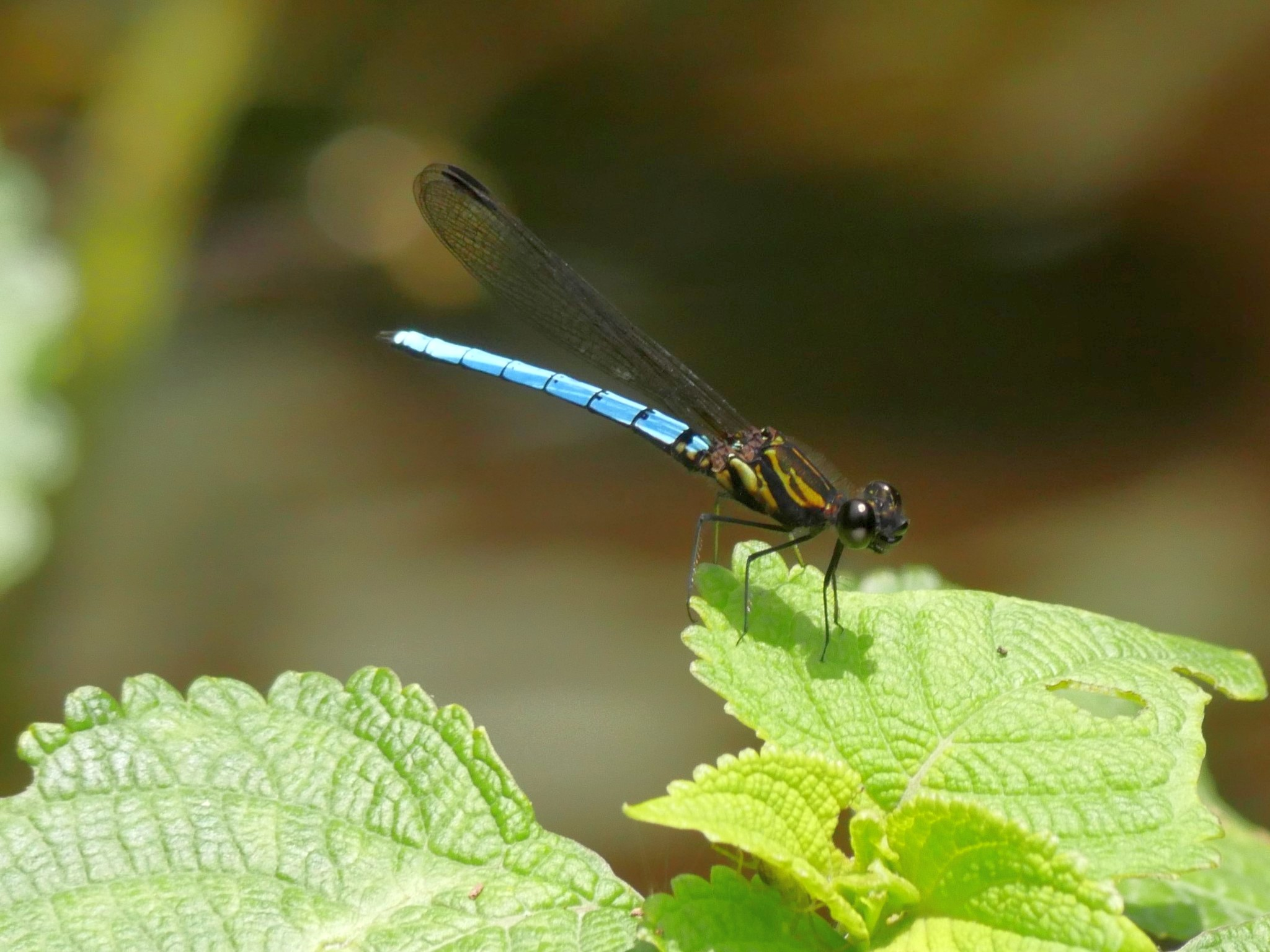

Conservation status
- Least Concern (IUCN 3.1)

Scientific classification
- Domain: Eukaryota
- Kingdom: Animalia
- Phylum: Arthropoda
- Class: Insecta
- Order: Odonata
- Suborder: Zygoptera
- Family: Chlorocyphidae
- Genus: Chlorocypha
- Species: C. aphrodite

Binomial name
- Chlorocypha aphrodite (Le Roi, 1915)

= Chlorocypha aphrodite =

Species of damselfly

Chlorocypha aphrodite, common name Blue Jewel, is a species of jewel damselfly in the family Chlorocyphidae.

The insect inhabits streams and rivers in the central African rainforest about the northern Congo River basin, with a confirmed range in northern Democratic Republic of the Congo, the Republic of the Congo, and adjacent portions of Gabon, Cameroon, and the Central African Republic.

The IUCN assessed Chlorocypha aphrodite as "least concern" on its Red List of Threatened Species, with no immediate threat to the species' survival. Logging is a concern. The IUCN assessment was published in 2017.
