= Chlorocypha seydeli =

Conservation status
- Least Concern (IUCN 3.1)

Scientific classification
- Kingdom: Animalia
- Phylum: Arthropoda
- Class: Insecta
- Order: Odonata
- Suborder: Zygoptera
- Family: Chlorocyphidae
- Genus: Chlorocypha
- Species: C. seydeli

Binomial name
- Chlorocypha seydeli Fraser, 1958

Species of damselfly

Chlorocypha seydeli is a species of jewel damselfly in the family Chlorocyphidae.

The IUCN conservation status of Chlorocypha seydeli is "LC", least concern, with no immediate threat to the species' survival. The IUCN status was reviewed in 2017.
