= Chlorocypha helenae =

Conservation status
- Near Threatened (IUCN 3.1)

Scientific classification
- Kingdom: Animalia
- Phylum: Arthropoda
- Class: Insecta
- Order: Odonata
- Suborder: Zygoptera
- Family: Chlorocyphidae
- Genus: Chlorocypha
- Species: C. helenae

Binomial name
- Chlorocypha helenae Legrand, 1984

Species of damselfly

Chlorocypha helenae is a species of jewel damselfly in the family Chlorocyphidae.

The IUCN conservation status of Chlorocypha helenae is "NT", near threatened. The species may be considered threatened in the near future. The IUCN status was reviewed in 2018.
