= Chlorocypha luminosa =

Conservation status
- Least Concern (IUCN 3.1)

Scientific classification
- Kingdom: Animalia
- Phylum: Arthropoda
- Class: Insecta
- Order: Odonata
- Suborder: Zygoptera
- Family: Chlorocyphidae
- Genus: Chlorocypha
- Species: C. luminosa

Binomial name
- Chlorocypha luminosa (Karsch, 1893)

Species of damselfly

Chlorocypha luminosa is a species of jewel damselfly in the family Chlorocyphidae.

The IUCN conservation status of Chlorocypha luminosa is "LC", least concern, with no immediate threat to the species' survival. The IUCN status was reviewed in 2017.
