= Rhinocypha hageni =

Conservation status
- Endangered (IUCN 3.1)

Scientific classification
- Kingdom: Animalia
- Phylum: Arthropoda
- Class: Insecta
- Order: Odonata
- Suborder: Zygoptera
- Family: Chlorocyphidae
- Genus: Rhinocypha
- Species: R. hageni

Binomial name
- Rhinocypha hageni Krüger, 1898

Species of damselfly

Rhinocypha hageni is a species of damselfly in the family Chlorocyphidae. It is endemic to the Philippines. Its natural habitat is rivers. It is threatened by habitat loss.
