= Rhinocypha tincta =

Papuan jewel

Conservation status
- Least Concern (IUCN 3.1)

Scientific classification
- Kingdom: Animalia
- Phylum: Arthropoda
- Clade: Pancrustacea
- Class: Insecta
- Order: Odonata
- Suborder: Zygoptera
- Family: Chlorocyphidae
- Genus: Rhinocypha
- Species: R. tincta

Binomial name
- Rhinocypha tincta Rambur, 1842

Species of damselfly

Rhinocypha tincta is a species of damselfly in the family Chlorocyphidae, commonly known as a Papuan jewel. It is a medium-sized damselfly with a short stout body, it is black with blue markings, and has long dark wings with pterostigma. It has been recorded from South-east Asia, New Guinea and the Solomon Islands in the Pacific, where it inhabits streams.

== Etymology ==
The genus name Rhinocypha is derived from the Greek ῥίς (rhis, "nose") and κυφός (kyphos, "bent forward" or "hunchbacked"), referring to the protruding lower part of the face.

The species name tincta is derived from the Latin tingo ("to dye"), referring to the distinctive wing colouration.

== Gallery ==
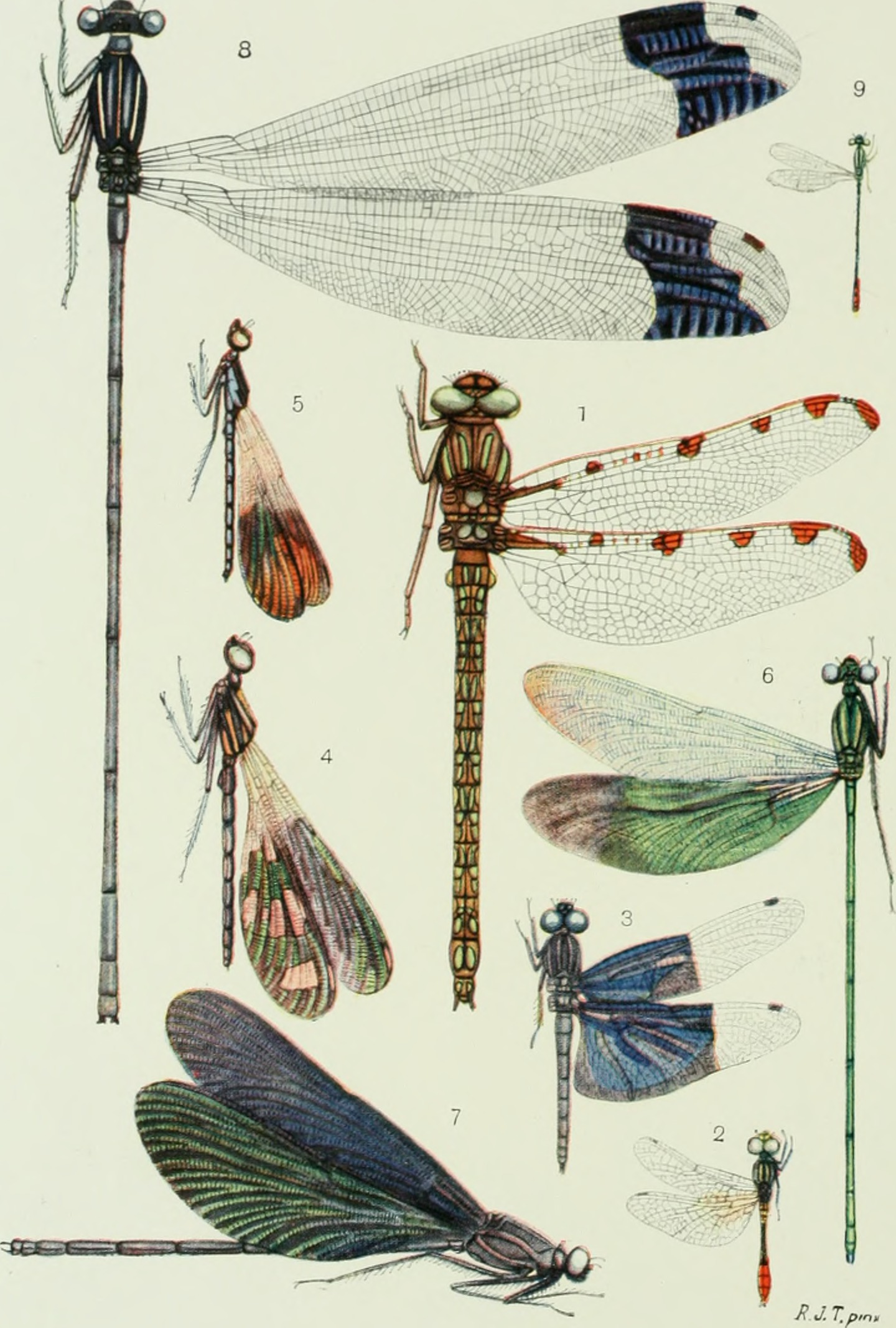
Figure 5. Male

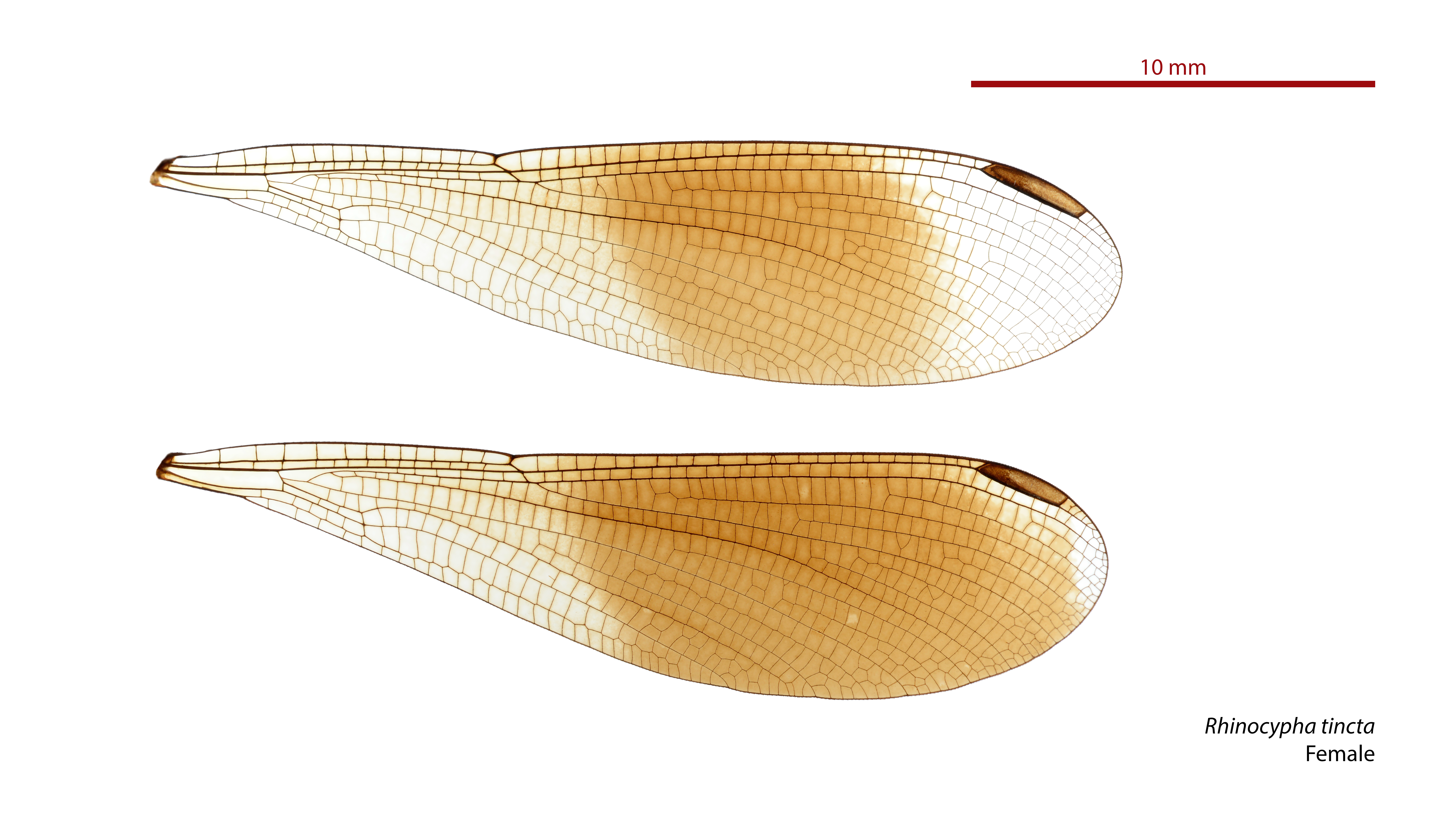
Female wings

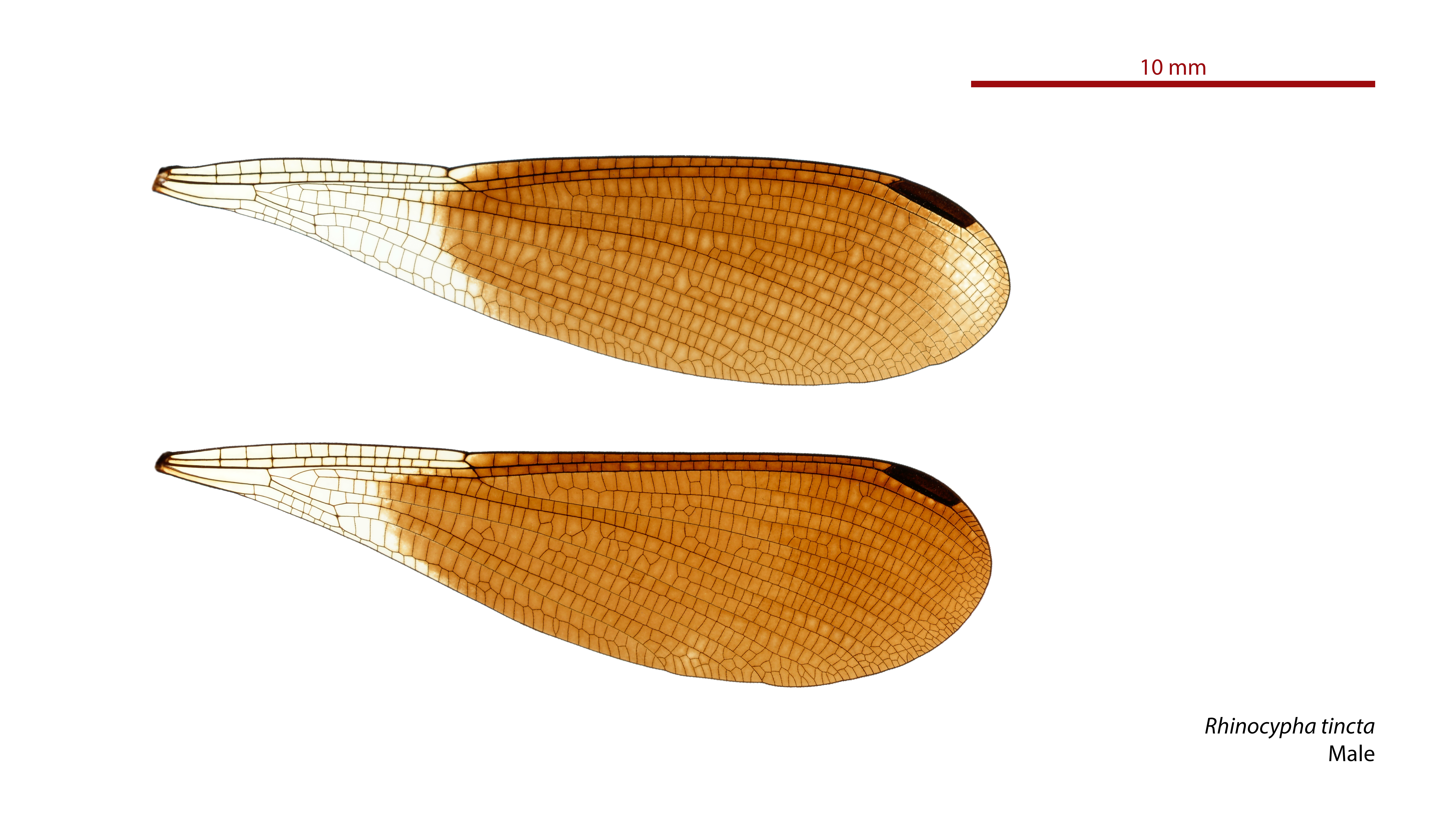
Male wings

== Notes ==
Early records of Rhinocypha tincta in Australia have not been confirmed.
