= Chlorocypha trifaria =

Conservation status
- Least Concern (IUCN 3.1)

Scientific classification
- Kingdom: Animalia
- Phylum: Arthropoda
- Class: Insecta
- Order: Odonata
- Suborder: Zygoptera
- Family: Chlorocyphidae
- Genus: Chlorocypha
- Species: C. trifaria

Binomial name
- Chlorocypha trifaria (Karsch, 1899)

Species of damselfly

Chlorocypha trifaria is a species of damselfly in the family Chlorocyphidae. It is found in the Republic of the Congo, the Democratic Republic of the Congo, Uganda, and possibly Sudan. Its natural habitats are subtropical or tropical moist lowland forests and rivers. It is threatened by habitat loss.
