= Rhinoneura caerulea =

Conservation status
- Data Deficient (IUCN 3.1)

Scientific classification
- Kingdom: Animalia
- Phylum: Arthropoda
- Class: Insecta
- Order: Odonata
- Suborder: Zygoptera
- Family: Chlorocyphidae
- Genus: Rhinoneura
- Species: R. caerulea

Binomial name
- Rhinoneura caerulea Kimmins, 1936

Species of damselfly

Rhinoneura caerulea is a species of jewel damselfly in the family Chlorocyphidae.

The IUCN conservation status of Rhinoneura caerulea is "DD", data deficient, risk undetermined.
