= Chlorocypha ghesquierei =

Conservation status
- Data Deficient (IUCN 3.1)

Scientific classification
- Kingdom: Animalia
- Phylum: Arthropoda
- Class: Insecta
- Order: Odonata
- Suborder: Zygoptera
- Family: Chlorocyphidae
- Genus: Chlorocypha
- Species: C. ghesquierei

Binomial name
- Chlorocypha ghesquierei Fraser, 1959

Species of damselfly

Chlorocypha ghesquierei is a species of jewel damselfly in the family Chlorocyphidae.
