= Chlorocypha jacksoni =

Conservation status
- Near Threatened (IUCN 3.1)

Scientific classification
- Kingdom: Animalia
- Phylum: Arthropoda
- Class: Insecta
- Order: Odonata
- Suborder: Zygoptera
- Family: Chlorocyphidae
- Genus: Chlorocypha
- Species: C. jacksoni

Binomial name
- Chlorocypha jacksoni Pinhey, 1952

Species of damselfly

Chlorocypha jacksoni is a species of damselfly in the family Chlorocyphidae. It is found in the Republic of the Congo, the Democratic Republic of the Congo, and Uganda. Its natural habitats are subtropical or tropical moist lowland forests, subtropical or tropical moist montane forests, and rivers. It is threatened by habitat loss.
