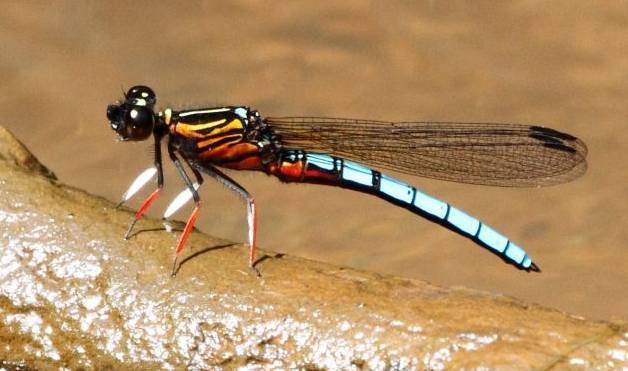
- Male
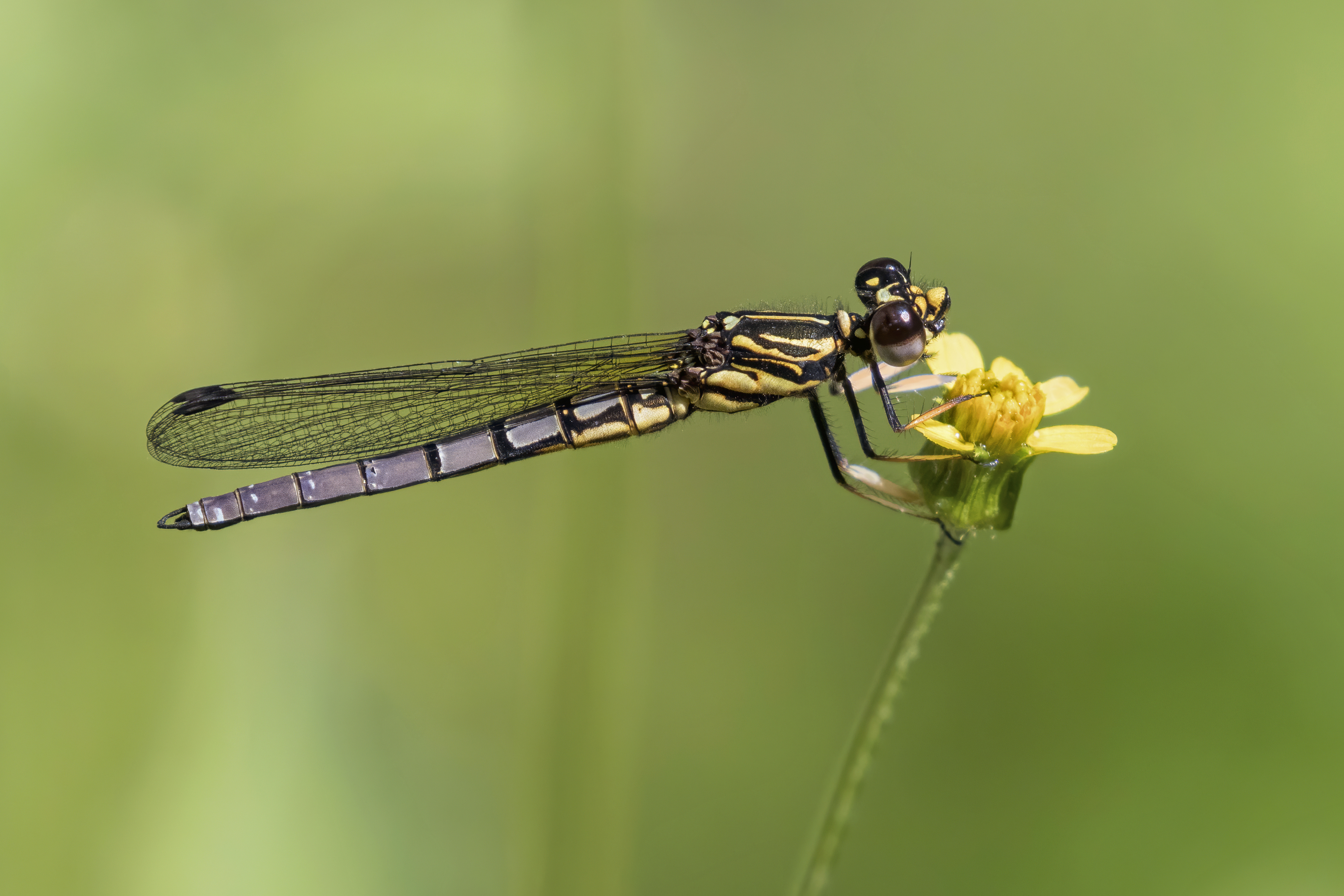
- teneral male

Conservation status
- Least Concern (IUCN 3.1)

Scientific classification
- Kingdom: Animalia
- Phylum: Arthropoda
- Class: Insecta
- Order: Odonata
- Suborder: Zygoptera
- Family: Chlorocyphidae
- Genus: Platycypha
- Species: P. caligata

Binomial name
- Platycypha caligata (Selys, 1853)

Synonyms
- Libellago caligata Selys, 1853

= Platycypha caligata =

Species of damselfly

Platycypha caligata, the dancing jewel, is a species of damselfly in the family Chlorocyphidae. It is found in eastern, central and southern Africa from Ethiopia to Angola and South Africa. Its natural habitats include shady parts of subtropical or tropical streams and rivers in forest, woodland, savanna, and shrubland, and shorelines of lakes.

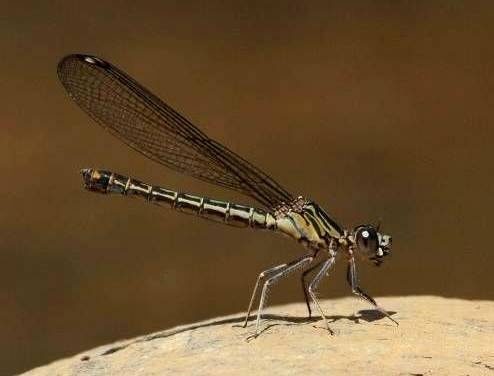
female, Ithala Game Reserve

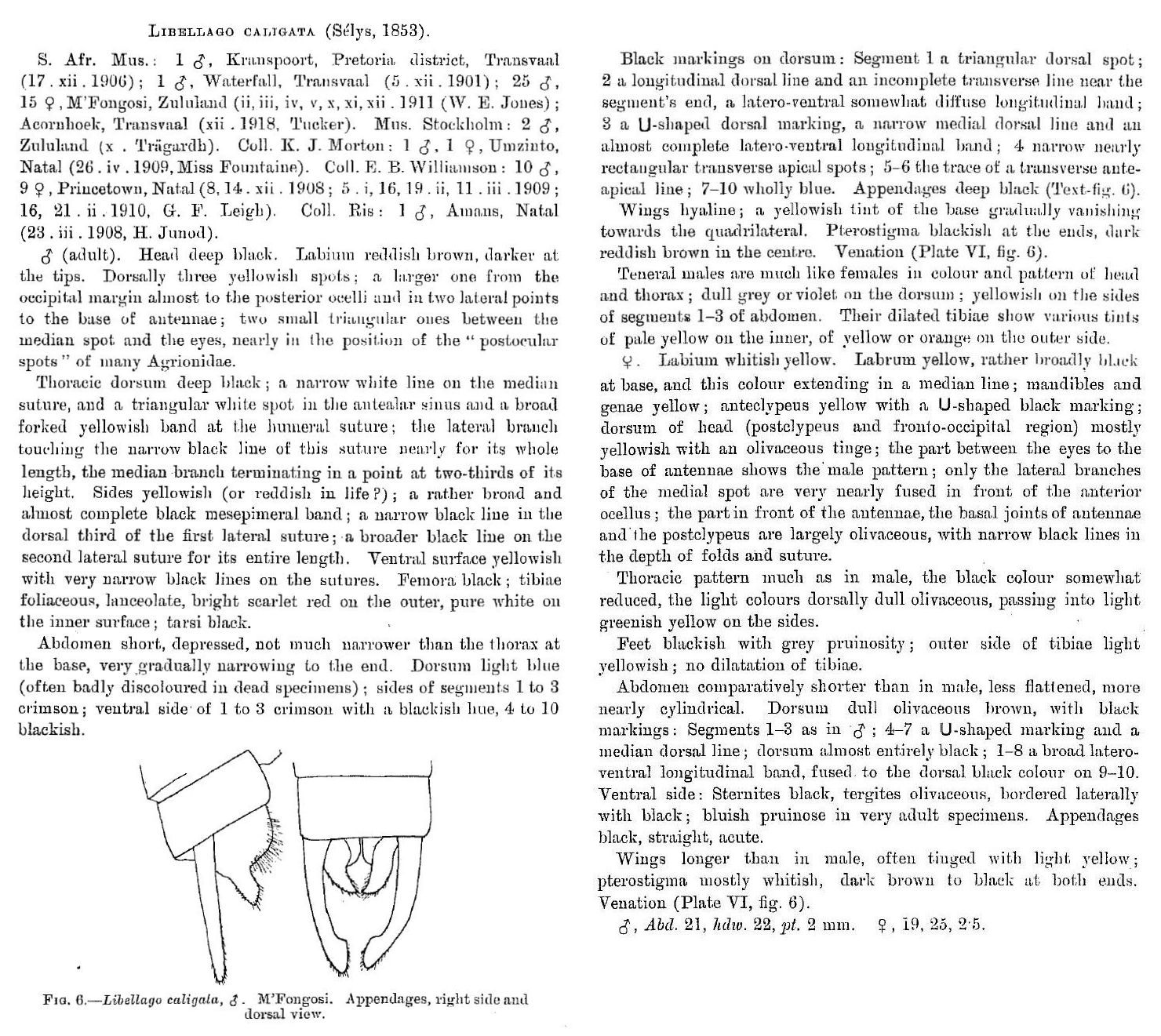
Description by Ris (1921)

Males perform remarkable territorial and courtship displays which include flashing and vibrating (foot waggling) their brightly colored legs with flattened tibiae and waving their abdomens. Experimentally varying tibial colours showed functions of anterior and posterior tibial colours to be distinct. The white anterior colouration was vital during courtship to attract mates and achieve tandem formation. Similarly, the red colouration on the posterior of the tibia was necessary for territorial signalling to other males.
