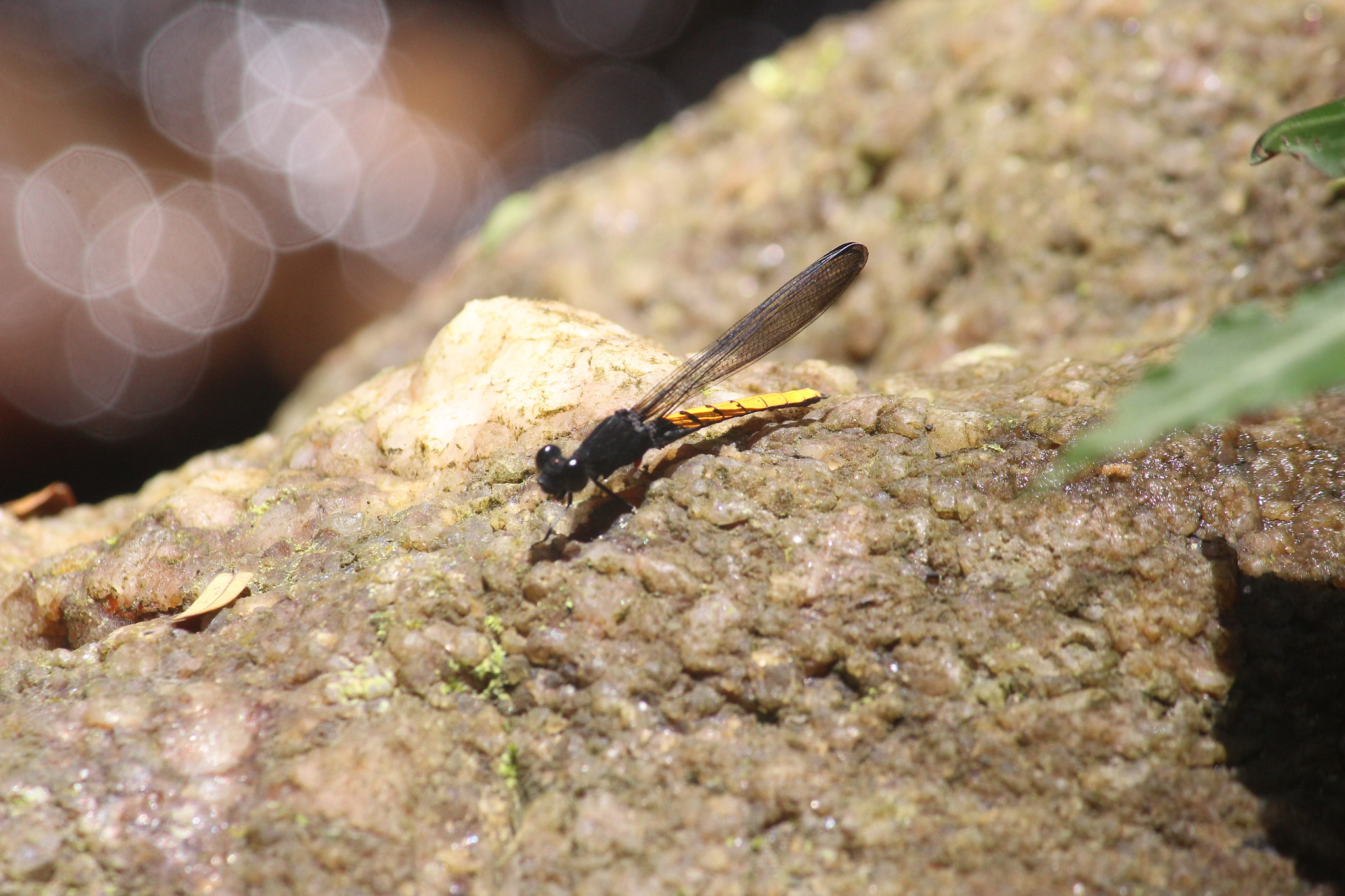

Conservation status
- Endangered (IUCN 3.1)

Scientific classification
- Kingdom: Animalia
- Phylum: Arthropoda
- Class: Insecta
- Order: Odonata
- Suborder: Zygoptera
- Family: Chlorocyphidae
- Genus: Chlorocypha
- Species: C. schmidti

Binomial name
- Chlorocypha schmidti Pinhey, 1967

= Chlorocypha schmidti =

Species of damselfly

Chlorocypha schmidti is a species of damselfly in the family Chlorocyphidae. It is found in the Republic of the Congo, the Democratic Republic of the Congo, and Tanzania. Its natural habitats are subtropical or tropical moist lowland forests, subtropical or tropical moist montane forests, and rivers. It is threatened by habitat loss.
