= Chlorocypha tenuis =

Conservation status
- Least Concern (IUCN 3.1)

Scientific classification
- Kingdom: Animalia
- Phylum: Arthropoda
- Class: Insecta
- Order: Odonata
- Suborder: Zygoptera
- Family: Chlorocyphidae
- Genus: Chlorocypha
- Species: C. tenuis

Binomial name
- Chlorocypha tenuis Longfield, 1936

Species of damselfly

Chlorocypha tenuis is a species of damselfly in the family Chlorocyphidae. It is found in Burundi, the Republic of the Congo, the Democratic Republic of the Congo, Kenya, and Uganda. Its natural habitats are subtropical or tropical moist lowland forests and rivers. It is threatened by habitat loss.
