= Chlorocypha victoriae =

Conservation status
- Least Concern (IUCN 3.1)

Scientific classification
- Kingdom: Animalia
- Phylum: Arthropoda
- Class: Insecta
- Order: Odonata
- Suborder: Zygoptera
- Family: Chlorocyphidae
- Genus: Chlorocypha
- Species: C. victoriae

Binomial name
- Chlorocypha victoriae (Förster, 1914)

Species of damselfly

Chlorocypha victoriae is a species of damselfly in the family Chlorocyphidae. It is found in Angola, Cameroon, Central African Republic, the Republic of the Congo, the Democratic Republic of the Congo, Uganda, Zambia, and possibly Equatorial Guinea. Its natural habitats are subtropical or tropical moist lowland forests and rivers. It is threatened by habitat loss.
