= Chlorocypha cyanifrons =

Conservation status
- Least Concern (IUCN 3.1)

Scientific classification
- Kingdom: Animalia
- Phylum: Arthropoda
- Class: Insecta
- Order: Odonata
- Suborder: Zygoptera
- Family: Chlorocyphidae
- Genus: Chlorocypha
- Species: C. cyanifrons

Binomial name
- Chlorocypha cyanifrons (Selys, 1873)

Species of damselfly

Chlorocypha cyanifrons is a species of jewel damselfly in the family Chlorocyphidae.

The IUCN conservation status of Chlorocypha cyanifrons is "LC", least concern, with no immediate threat to the species' survival. The IUCN status was reviewed in 2018.
