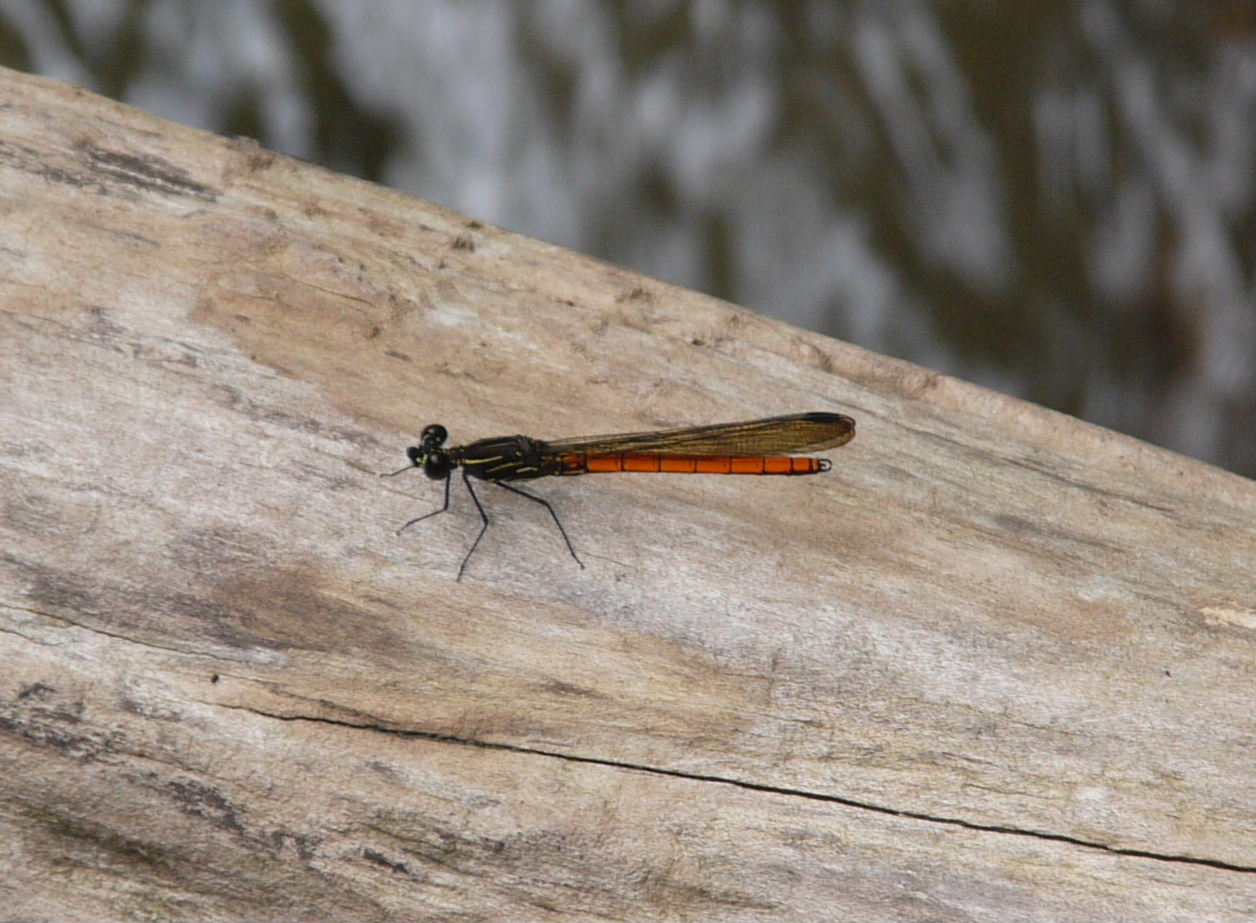

Conservation status
- Endangered (IUCN 2.3)

Scientific classification
- Kingdom: Animalia
- Phylum: Arthropoda
- Class: Insecta
- Order: Odonata
- Suborder: Zygoptera
- Family: Chlorocyphidae
- Genus: Rhinocypha
- Species: R. uenoi

Binomial name
- Rhinocypha uenoi Asahina, 1964

= Rhinocypha uenoi =

Species of damselfly

Rhinocypha uenoi is a species of damselfly in the family Chlorocyphidae. It is endemic to Japan, only known to be found on Iriomote Island. The local common name for this species is yaeyama hanadaka tombo (ヤエヤマハナダカトンボ). Rhinocypha uenoi are a very endangered species.
