= Chlorocypha hintzi =

Scientific classification
- Domain: Eukaryota
- Kingdom: Animalia
- Phylum: Arthropoda
- Class: Insecta
- Order: Odonata
- Suborder: Zygoptera
- Family: Chlorocyphidae
- Genus: Chlorocypha
- Species: C. hintzi

Binomial name
- Chlorocypha hintzi Grünberg, 1914

Species of damselfly

Chlorocypha hintzi is a species of jewel damselfly in the family Chlorocyphidae.
