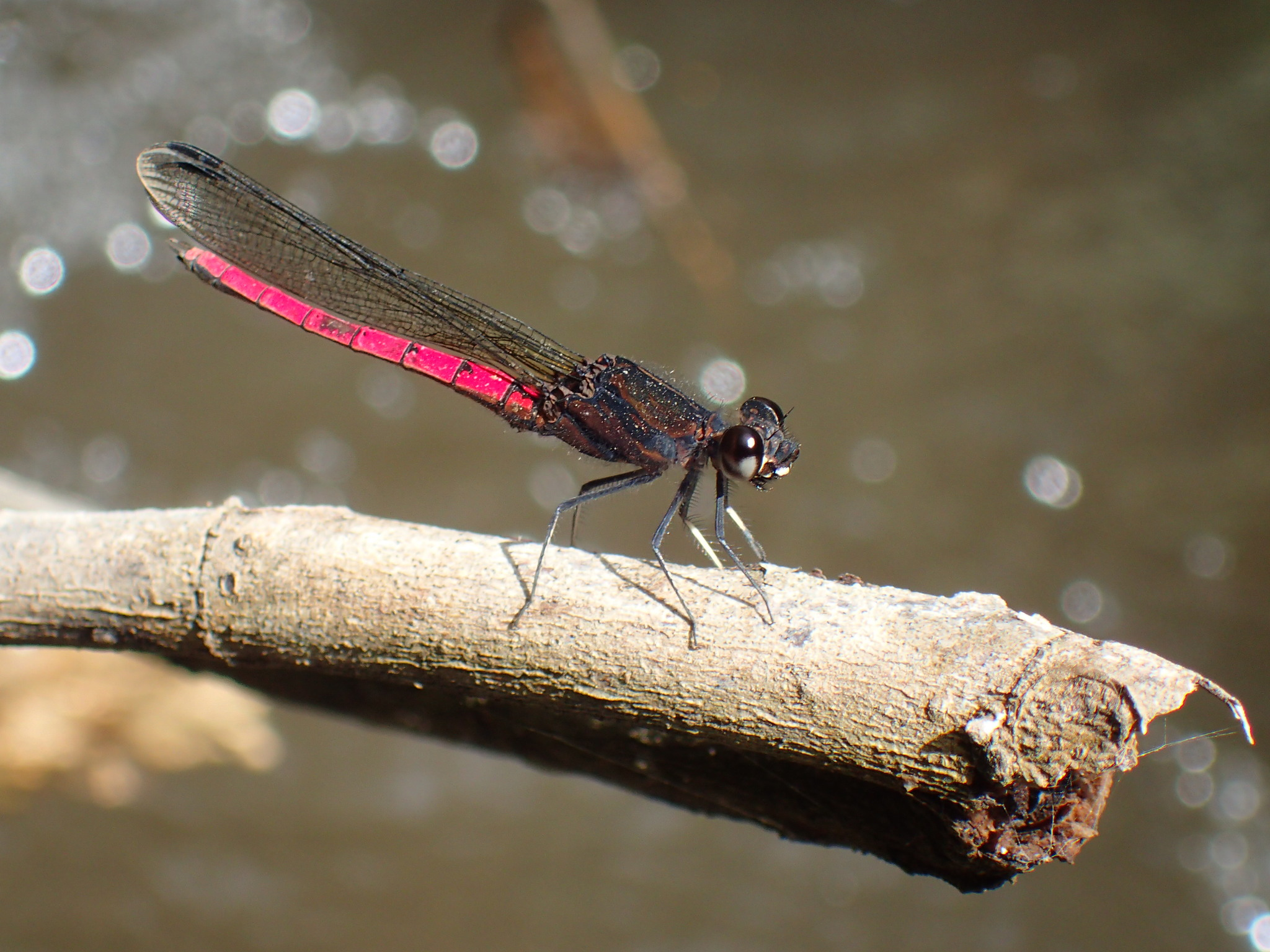
- A male Chlorocypha consueta

Conservation status
- Least Concern (IUCN 3.1)

Scientific classification
- Kingdom: Animalia
- Phylum: Arthropoda
- Class: Insecta
- Order: Odonata
- Suborder: Zygoptera
- Family: Chlorocyphidae
- Genus: Chlorocypha
- Species: C. consueta

Binomial name
- Chlorocypha consueta (Karsch, 1899)

= Chlorocypha consueta =

Species of damselfly

Chlorocypha consueta, the ruby jewel, is a species of damselfly in the family Chlorocyphidae.

== Distribution and status ==
Tropical Africa: Democratic Republic of the Congo; Malawi; Mozambique; Tanzania; Zambia; Zimbabwe. A widespread species; no major threats are known.

== Habitat ==
This species is most common along streams with gallery forest, but is also found on rivers and in more open habitats.
