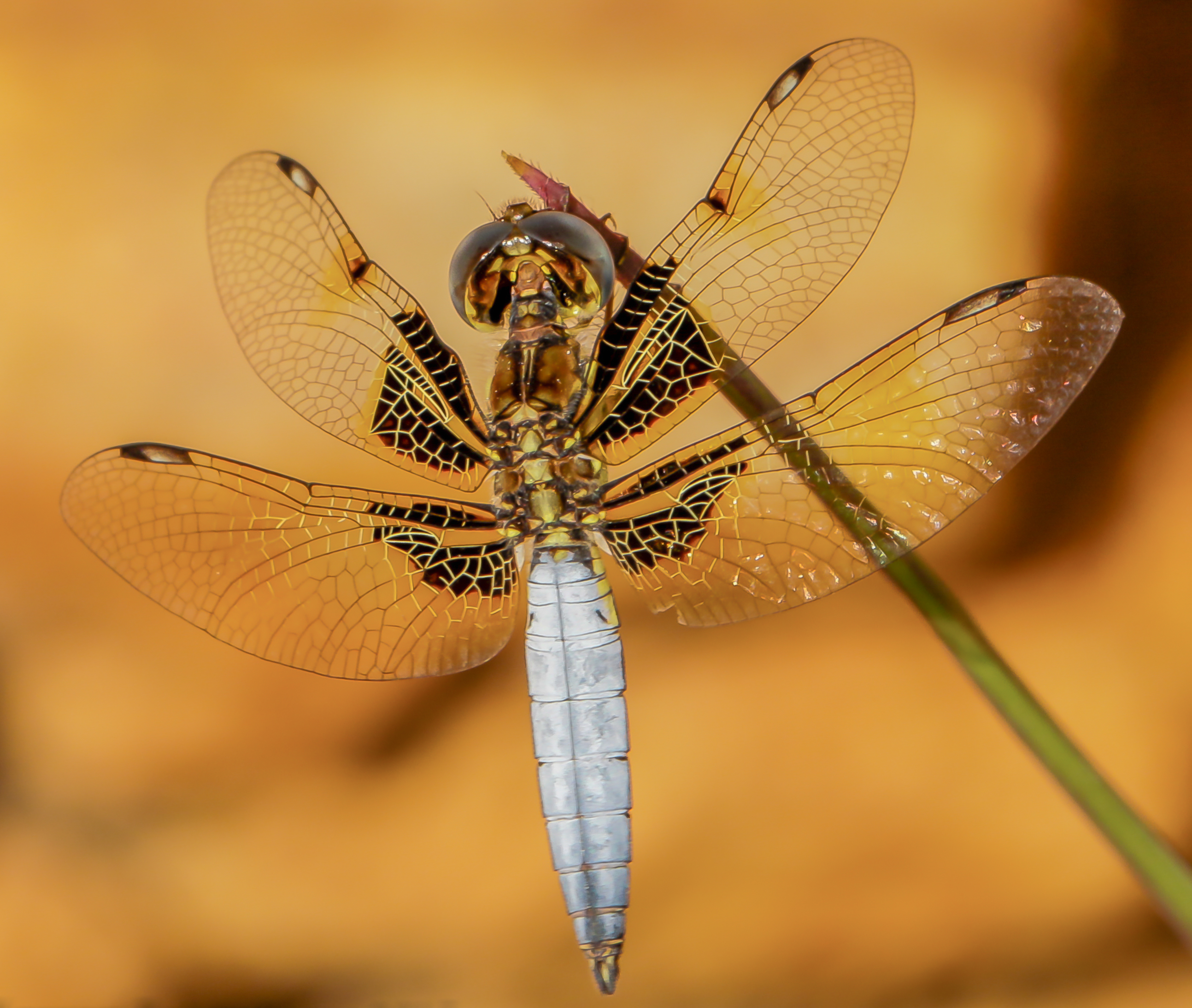

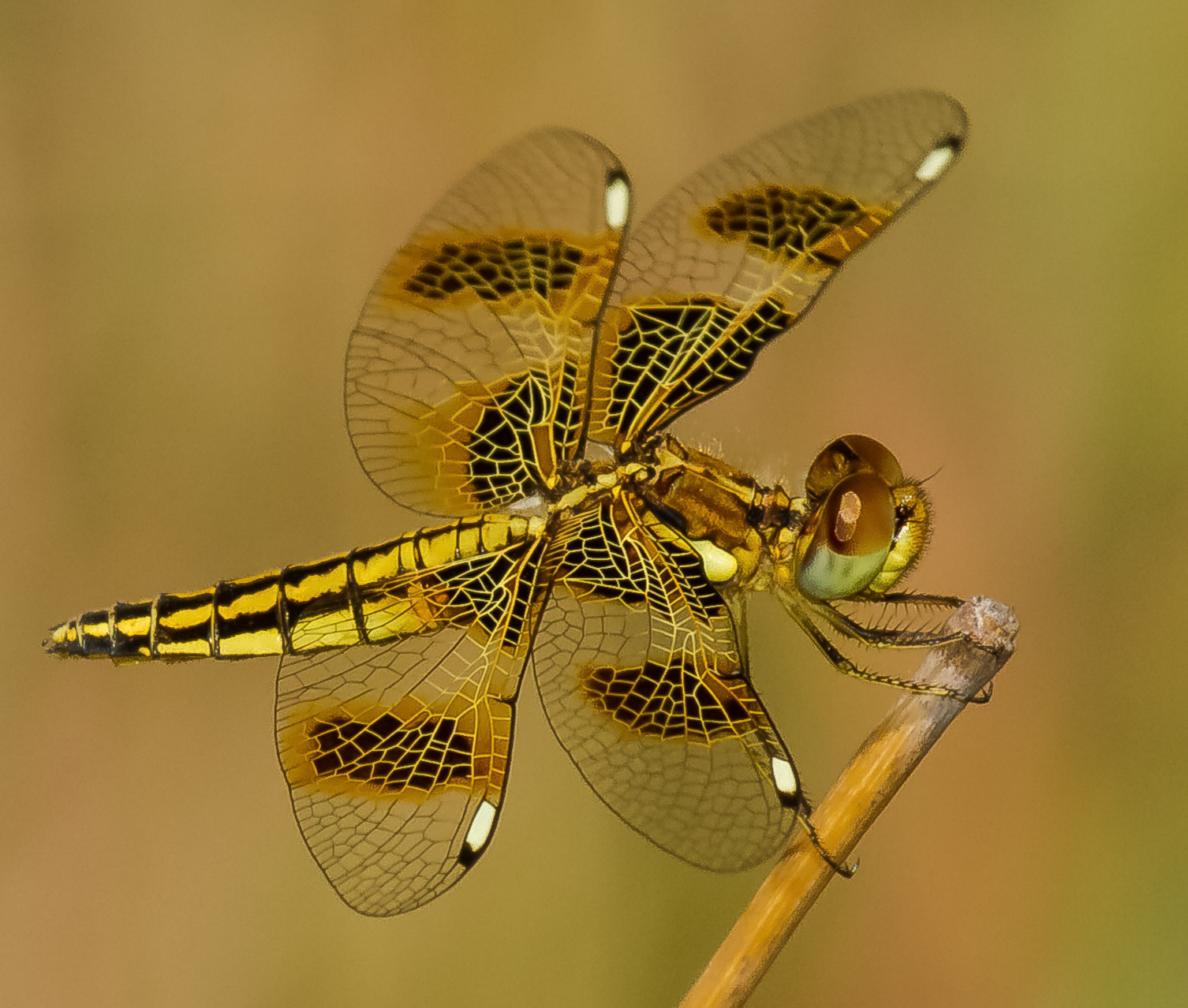
- Male and female

Conservation status
- Least Concern (IUCN 3.1)

Scientific classification
- Kingdom: Animalia
- Phylum: Arthropoda
- Class: Insecta
- Order: Odonata
- Infraorder: Anisoptera
- Family: Libellulidae
- Genus: Palpopleura
- Species: P. jucunda

Binomial name
- Palpopleura jucunda Rambur, 1842

= Palpopleura jucunda =

Species of dragonfly

Palpopleura jucunda, commonly known as the yellow-veined widow, is a species of dragonfly in the family Libellulidae, which is native to sub-Saharan Africa.

== Range and habitat ==
It is found in Angola, Botswana, the DRC, Ivory Coast, Ethiopia, Kenya, Malawi, Mozambique, Namibia, Nigeria, South Africa, Sudan, Tanzania, Uganda, Zambia, Zimbabwe, and possibly Burundi. Its natural habitats are swamps and intermittent freshwater marshes.
