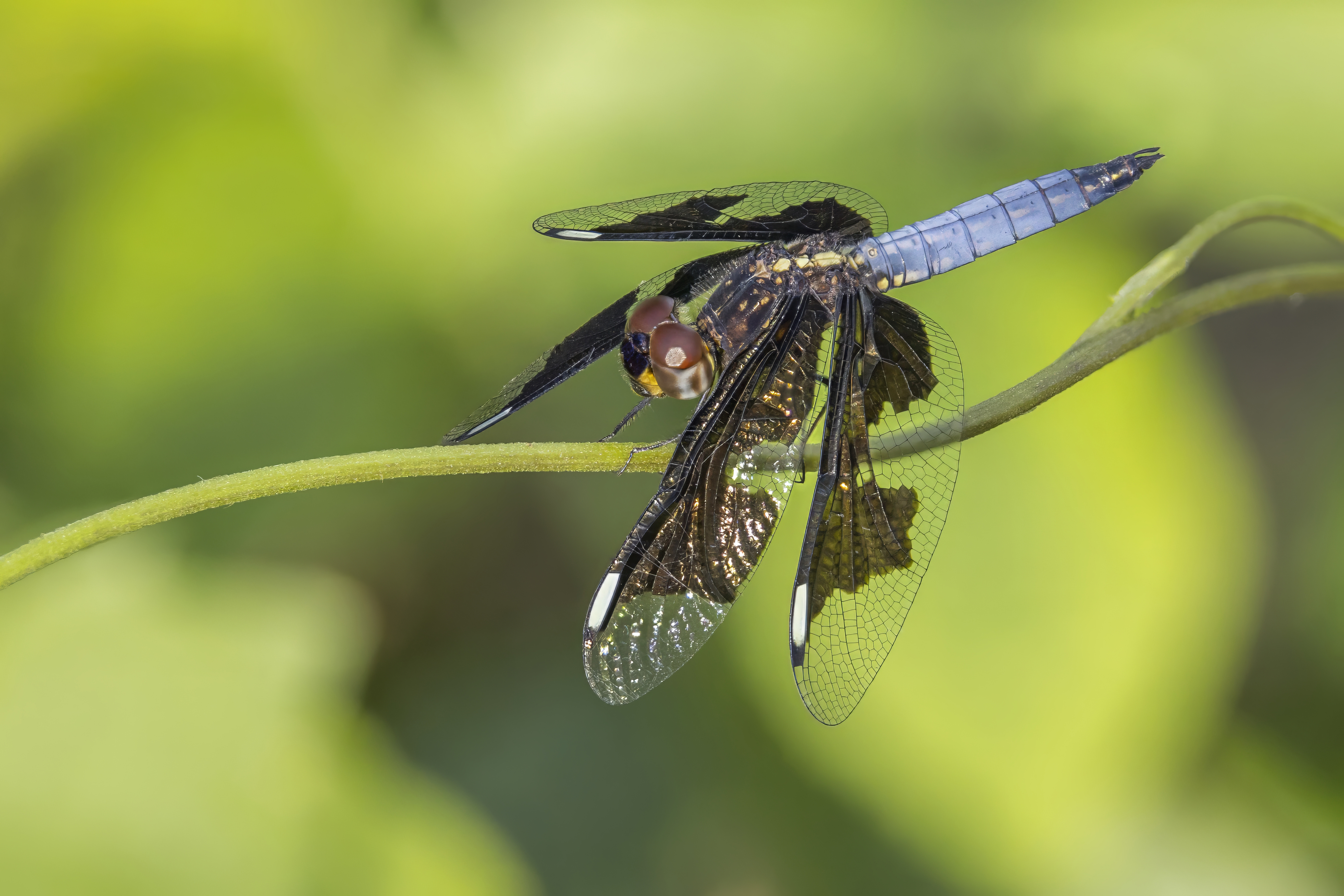
- Male
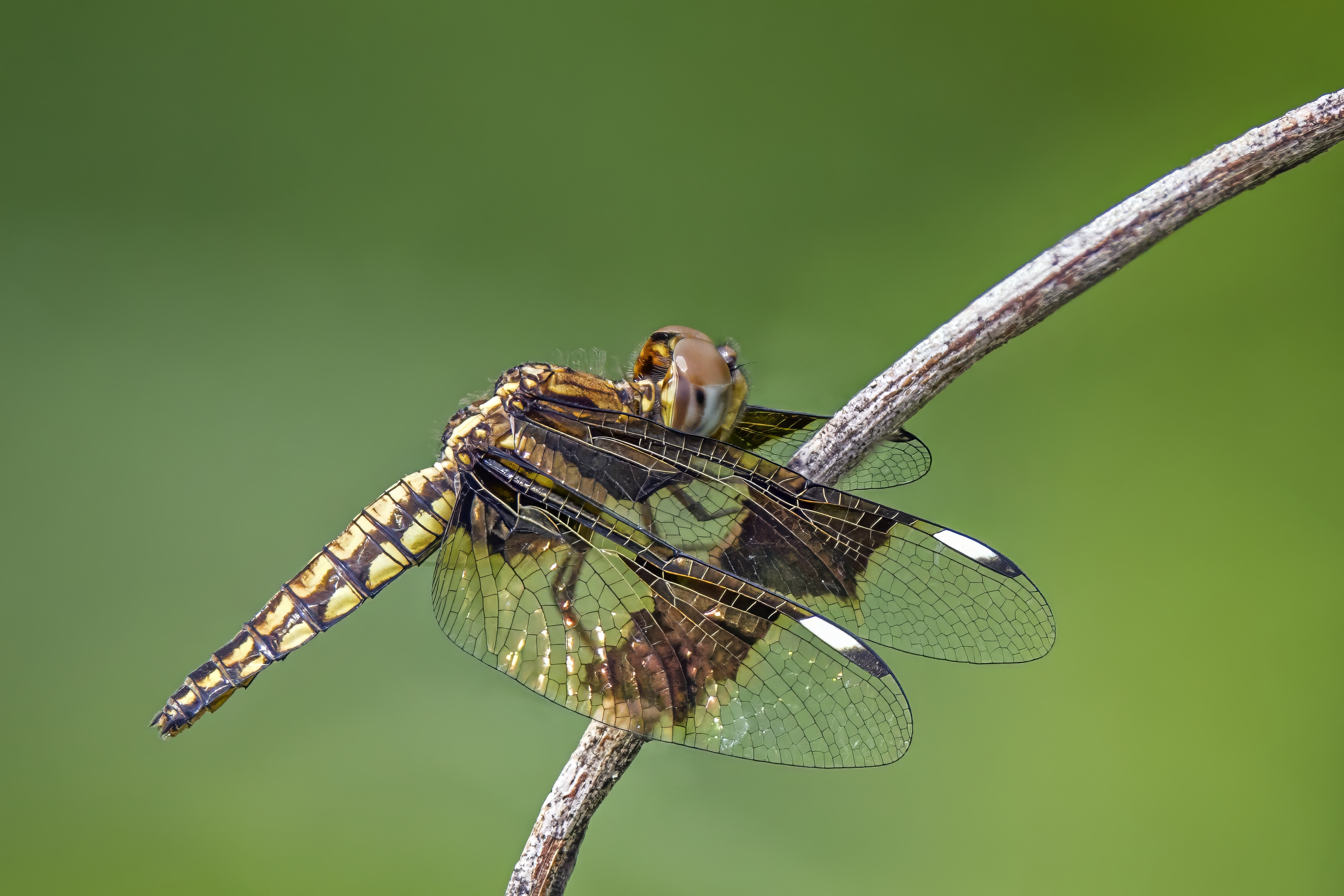
- Female; Both in Ghana

Conservation status
- Least Concern (IUCN 3.1)

Scientific classification
- Kingdom: Animalia
- Phylum: Arthropoda
- Clade: Pancrustacea
- Class: Insecta
- Order: Odonata
- Suborder: Anisoptera
- Superfamily: Libelluloidea
- Family: Libellulidae
- Genus: Palpopleura
- Species: P. portia

Binomial name
- Palpopleura portia (Drury, 1773)

= Palpopleura portia =

Species of dragonfly

Palpopleura portia, the portia widow, is a species of dragonfly in the family Libellulidae. It is found in Angola, Botswana, Burkina Faso, Central African Republic, the Democratic Republic of the Congo, Ivory Coast, Equatorial Guinea, Ethiopia, Gambia, Kenya, Madagascar, Malawi, Mozambique, Namibia, Nigeria, Senegal, Somalia, South Africa, Sudan, Tanzania, Togo, Uganda, Zambia, Zimbabwe, and possibly Burundi. Its natural habitats are dry savanna, moist savanna, subtropical or tropical dry shrubland, subtropical or tropical moist shrubland, rivers, intermittent rivers, shrub-dominated wetlands, swamps, freshwater lakes, intermittent freshwater lakes, freshwater marshes, intermittent freshwater marshes, and freshwater springs.

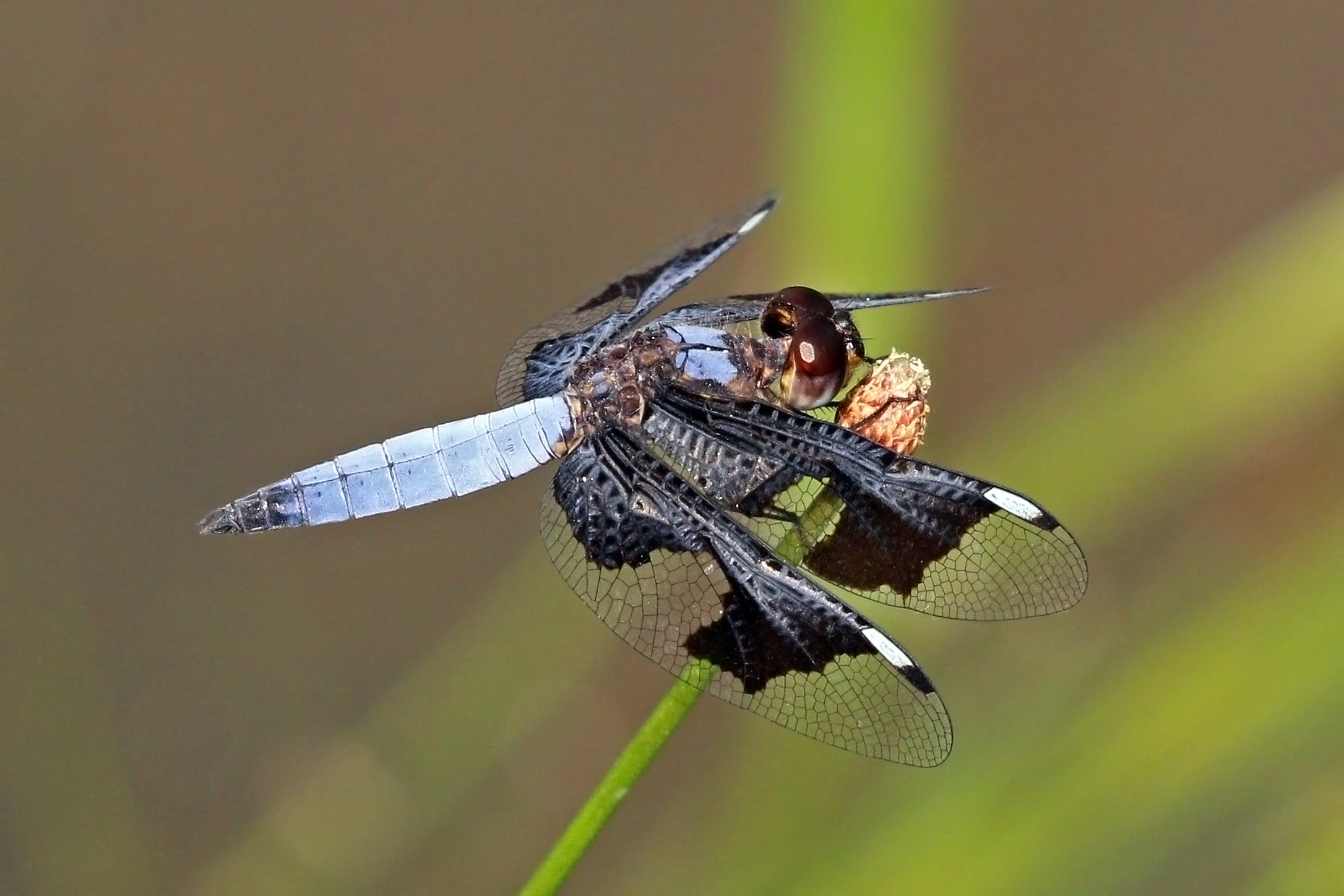
Male, Gambia

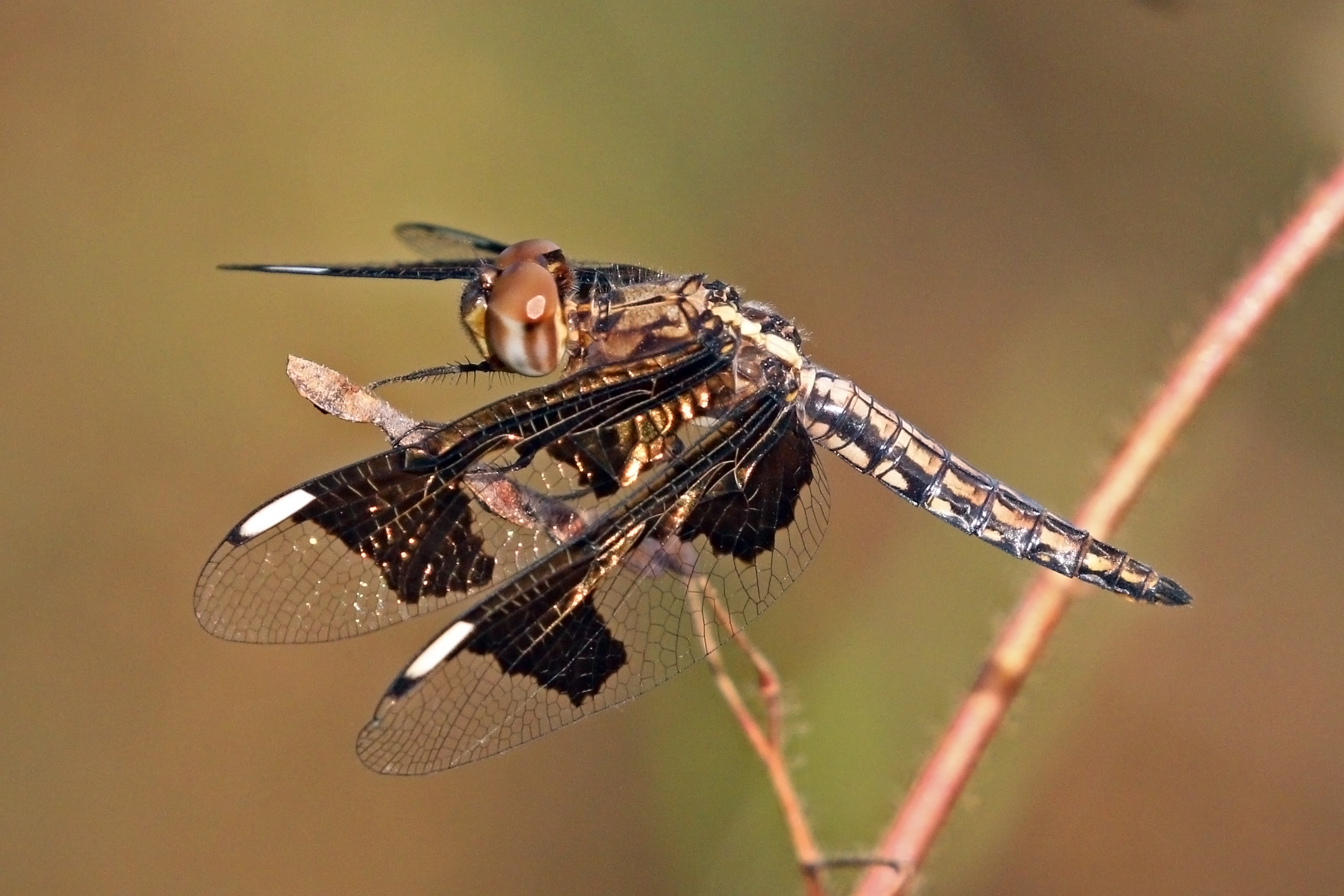
Female, Gambia

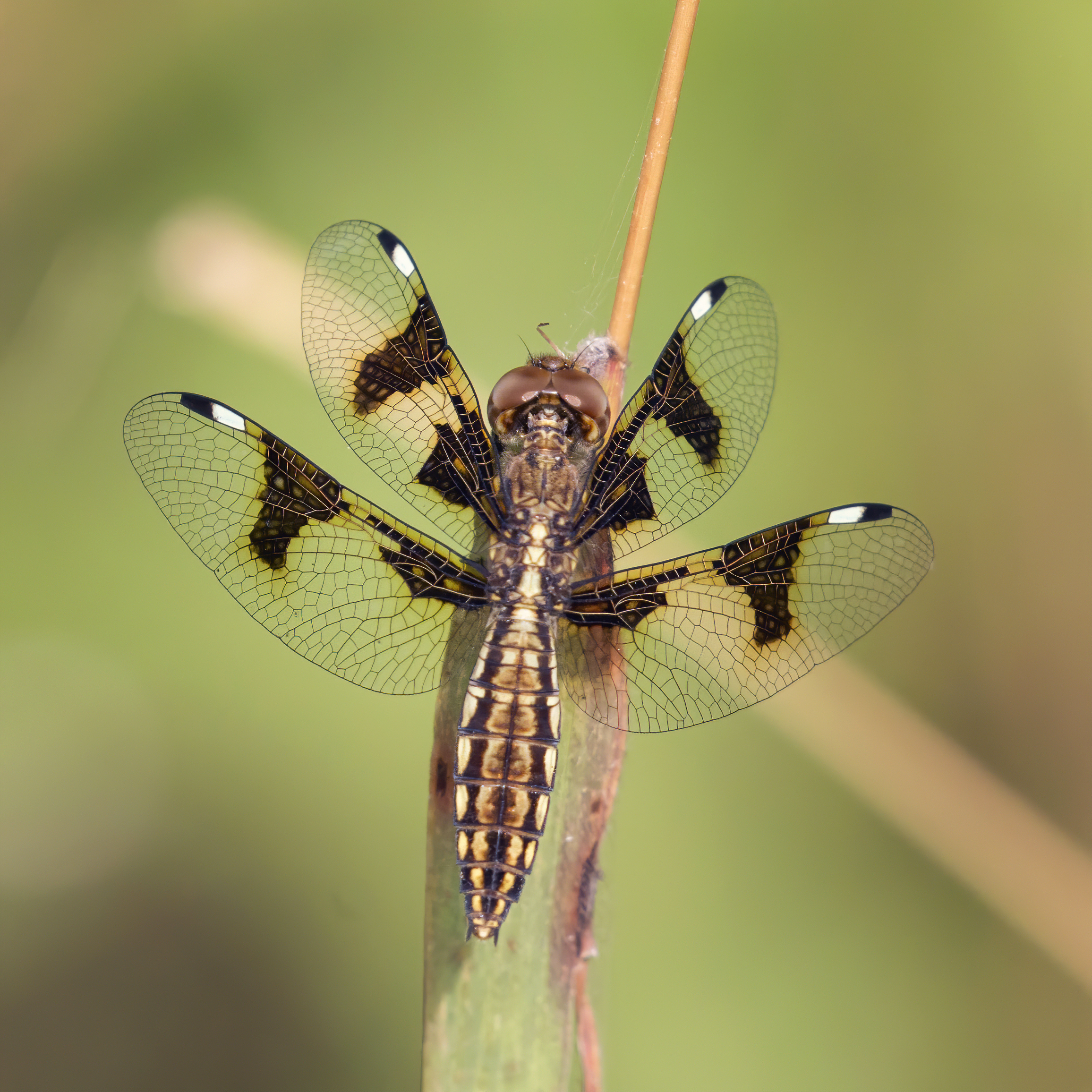
Female, Senegal
