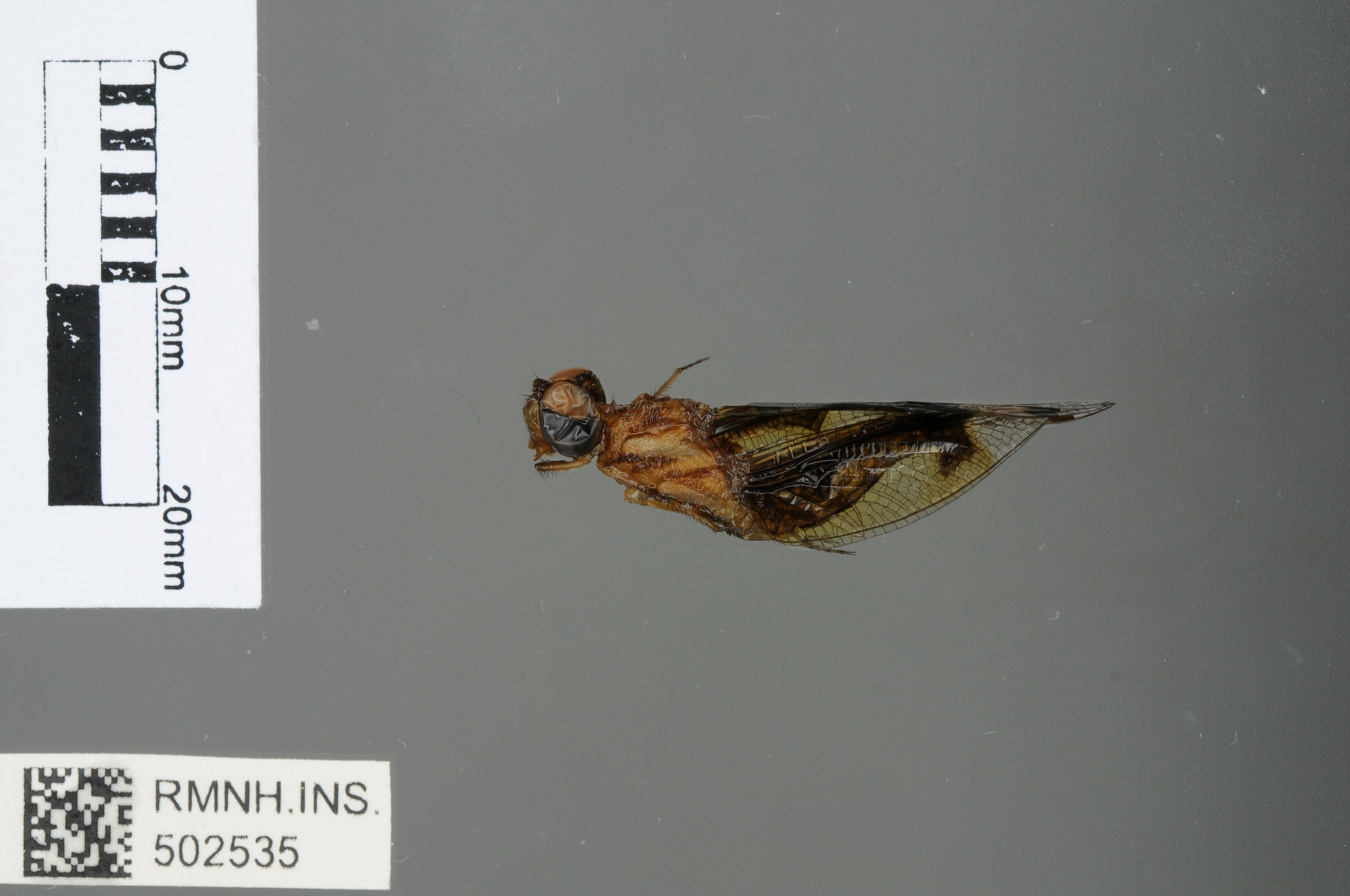

Conservation status
- Least Concern (IUCN 3.1)

Scientific classification
- Kingdom: Animalia
- Phylum: Arthropoda
- Class: Insecta
- Order: Odonata
- Infraorder: Anisoptera
- Family: Libellulidae
- Genus: Palpopleura
- Species: P. albifrons

Binomial name
- Palpopleura albifrons Legrand, 1979

= Palpopleura albifrons =

Species of dragonfly

Palpopleura albifrons is a species of dragonfly in the family Libellulidae. It is endemic to Gabon. Its natural habitat is subtropical or tropical moist lowland forests.
