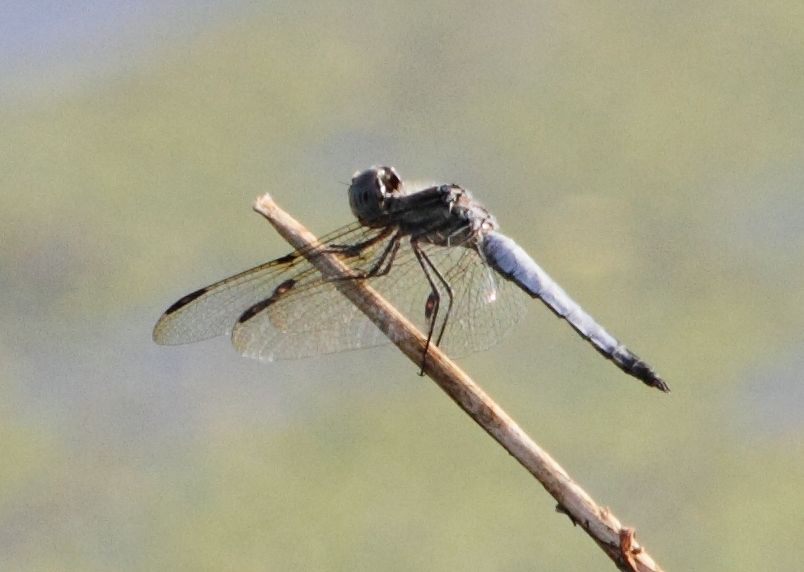
- Male
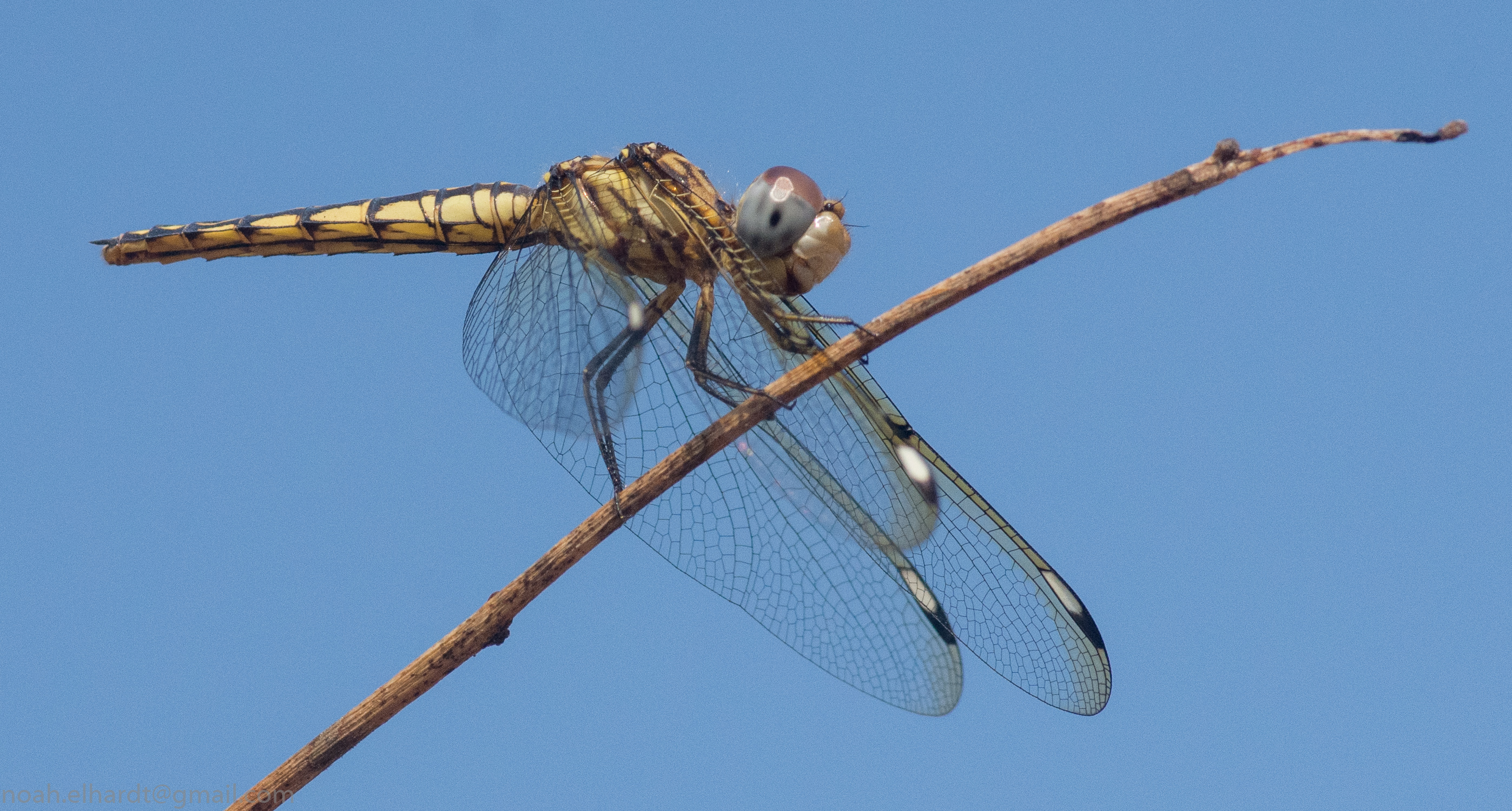
- Female

Conservation status
- Least Concern (IUCN 3.1)

Scientific classification
- Kingdom: Animalia
- Phylum: Arthropoda
- Class: Insecta
- Order: Odonata
- Infraorder: Anisoptera
- Family: Libellulidae
- Genus: Palpopleura
- Species: P. deceptor

Binomial name
- Palpopleura deceptor (Calvert, 1899)

= Palpopleura deceptor =

Species of dragonfly

Palpopleura deceptor, the deceptive widow, is a species of dragonfly in the family Libellulidae. It is found in Benin, Botswana, Burkina Faso, Cameroon, Chad, the Democratic Republic of the Congo, Ivory Coast, Ethiopia, Gambia, Ghana, Guinea, Kenya, Malawi, Mozambique, Namibia, Niger, Nigeria, Sierra Leone, Somalia, South Africa, Sudan, Tanzania, Togo, Uganda, Zambia, Zimbabwe, and possibly Burundi. Its natural habitats are subtropical or tropical moist lowland forests, dry savanna, moist savanna, subtropical or tropical dry shrubland, subtropical or tropical moist shrubland, subtropical or tropical seasonally wet or flooded lowland grassland, swamps, intermittent freshwater lakes, and intermittent freshwater marshes.
