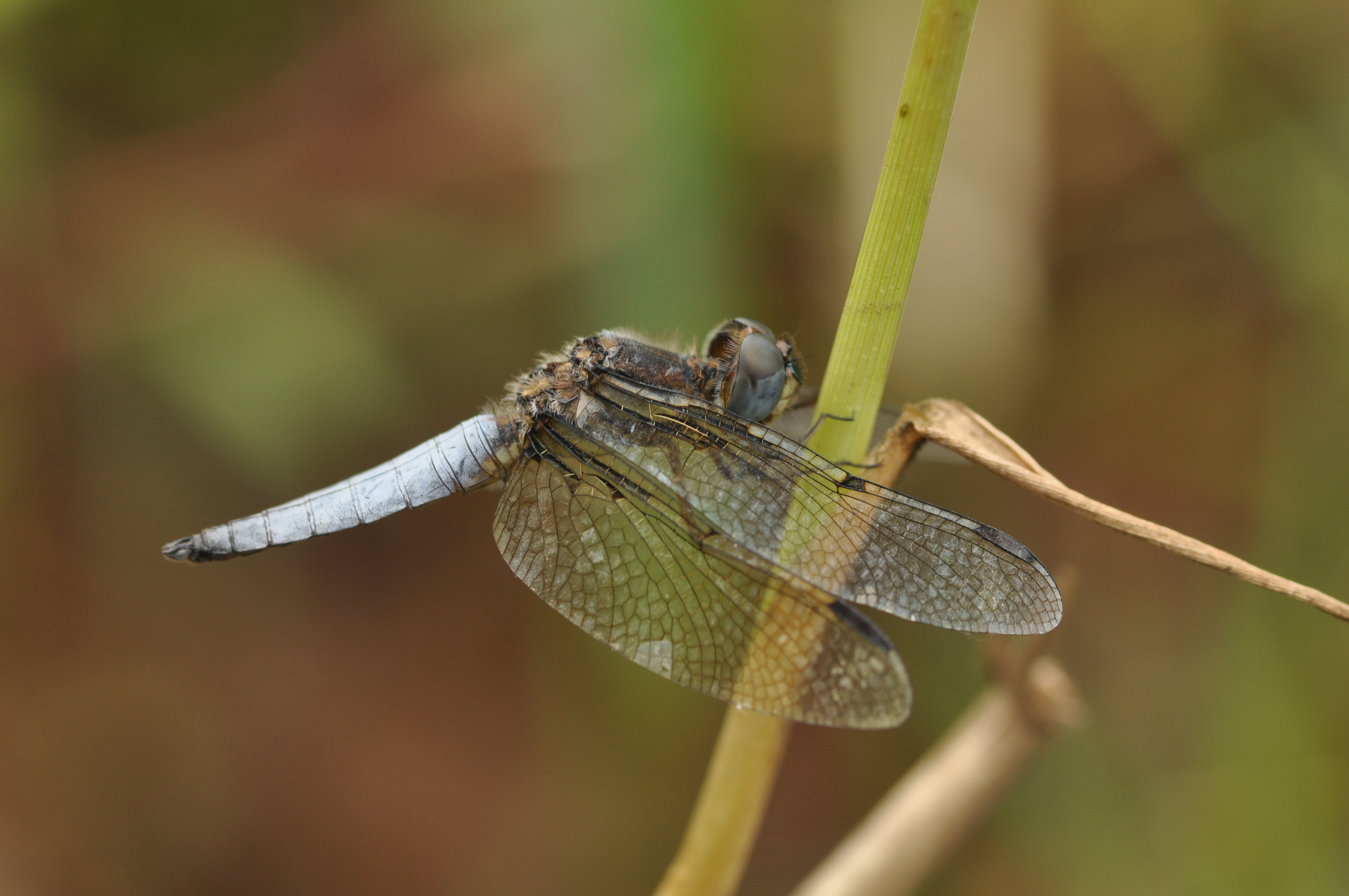
- Male

Conservation status
- Least Concern (IUCN 3.1)

Scientific classification
- Kingdom: Animalia
- Phylum: Arthropoda
- Class: Insecta
- Order: Odonata
- Infraorder: Anisoptera
- Family: Libellulidae
- Genus: Palpopleura
- Species: P. sexmaculata

Binomial name
- Palpopleura sexmaculata (Fabricius, 1787)

Synonyms
- Aeshna minuta Fabricius, 1787; Palpopleura minuta (Fabricius, 1787)

= Palpopleura sexmaculata =

Species of dragonfly

Palpopleura sexmaculata, commonly known as the Asian widow or blue-tailed yellow skimmer, is a species of dragonfly in the family Libellulidae. It is widespread in several countries in South, East and Southeast Asia, but is no longer believed to occur in Sri Lanka.

== Description and habitat ==
It is a small dragonfly with brown capped greenish eyes. Its thorax is greenish yellow and hind-wings usually tinted with yellow from the base. Pterostigma is black in adults bi-colored in juveniles and sub-adults as in females. Its abdomen is pruinosed with light blue, leaving segments 1-3 as yellow. Sub-adult males and females are yellow. The pterostigma of the female are bi-colored with half black and half yellow. It breeds in marshy areas and small pools in the hills.

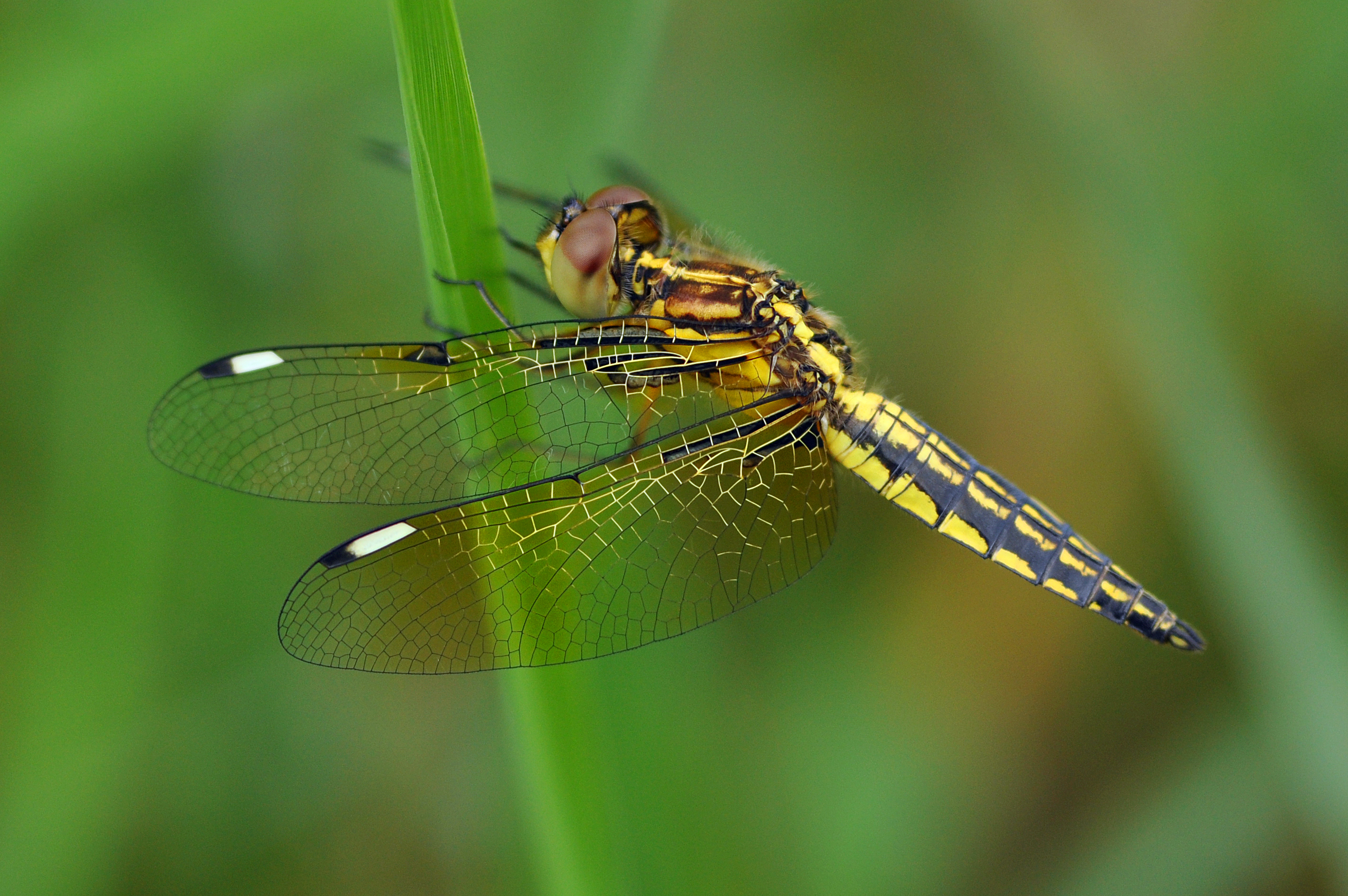
Young male

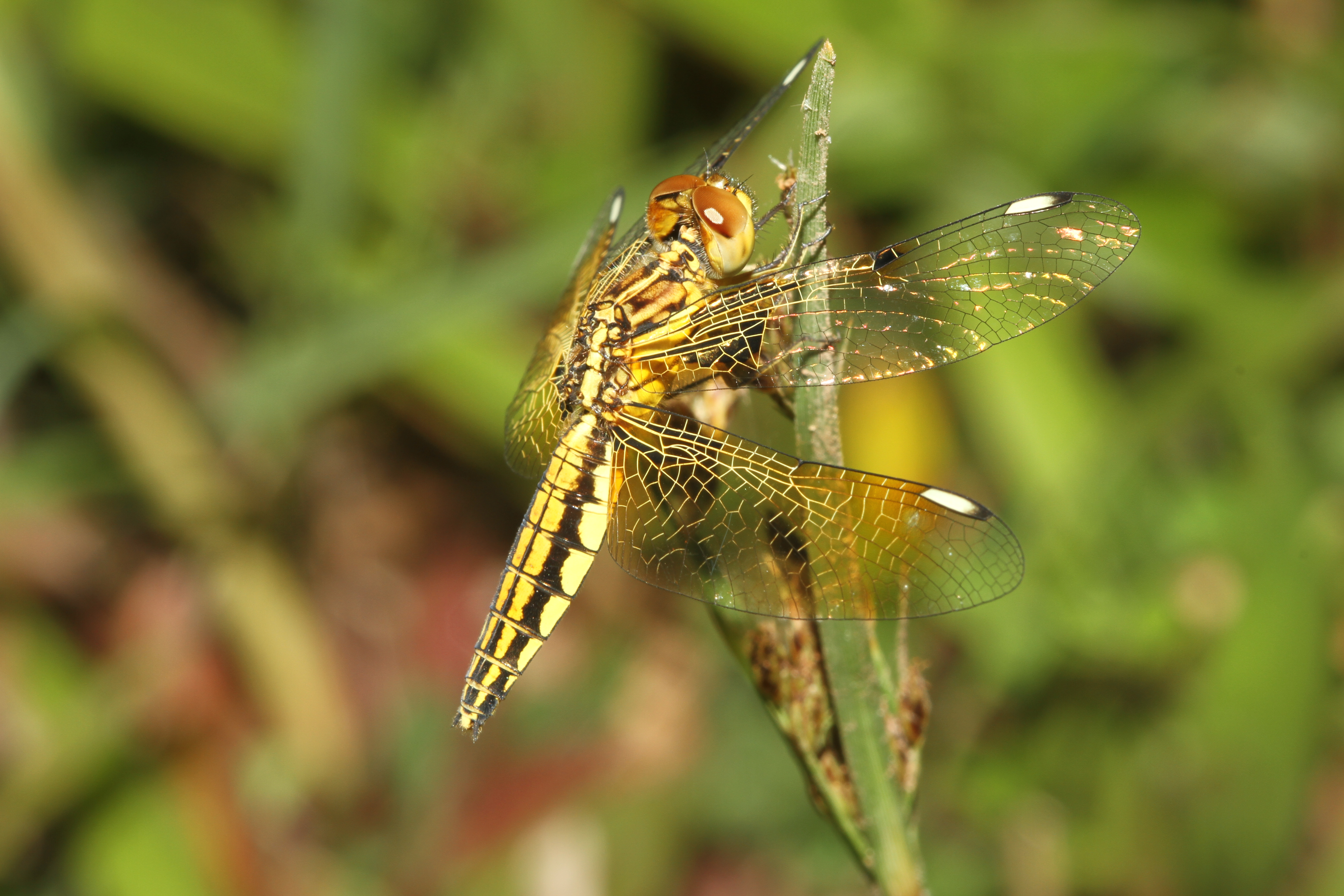
Female

== See also ==
- List of odonates of Sri Lanka
- List of odonates of India
- List of odonata of Kerala
