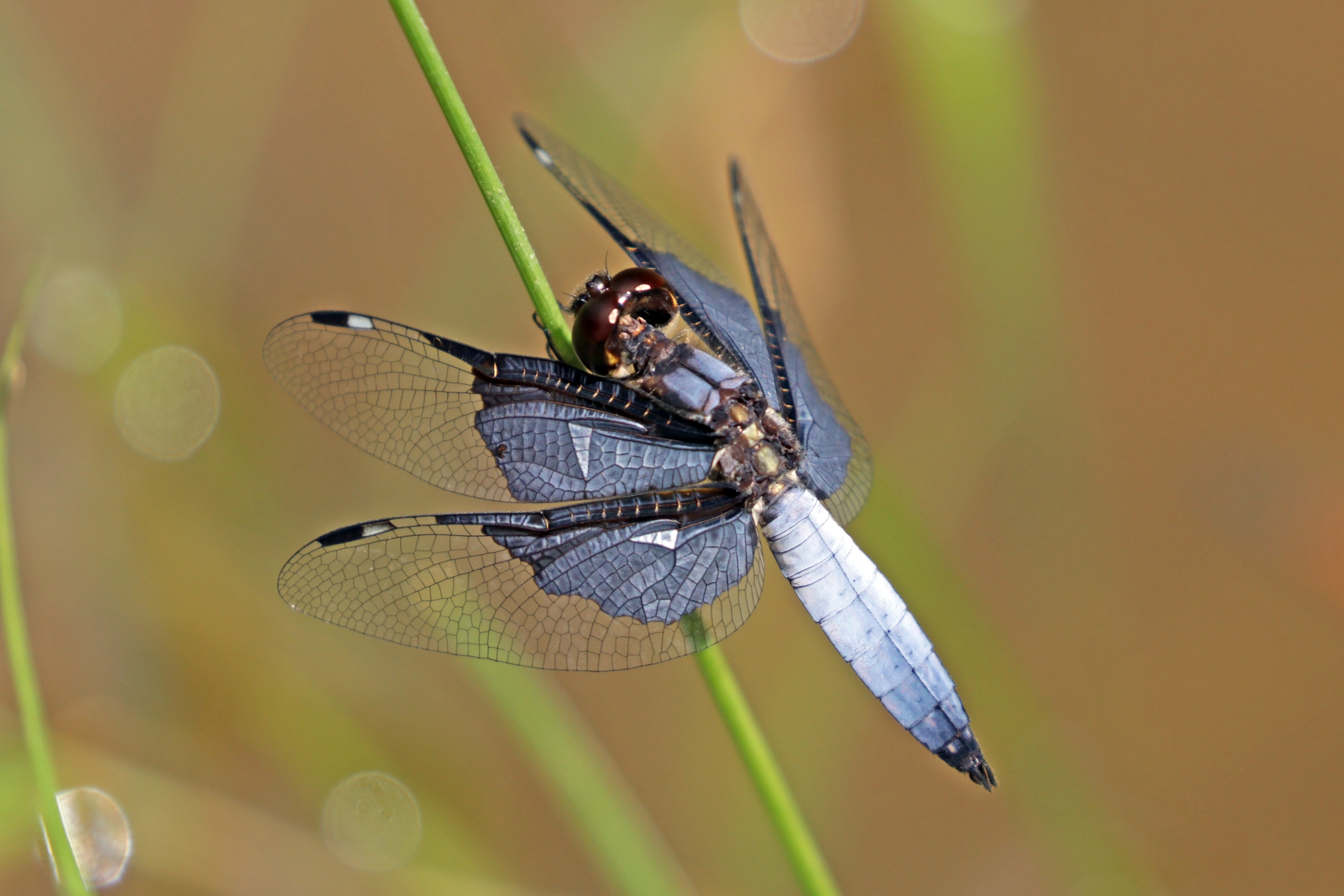
- Male, Peyrieras, Madagascar

Conservation status
- Least Concern (IUCN 3.1)

Scientific classification
- Kingdom: Animalia
- Phylum: Arthropoda
- Class: Insecta
- Order: Odonata
- Infraorder: Anisoptera
- Family: Libellulidae
- Genus: Palpopleura
- Species: P. vestita

Binomial name
- Palpopleura vestita Rambur, 1842

= Palpopleura vestita =

Species of dragonfly

Palpopleura vestita, commonly known as the silver widow, is a species of dragonfly in the family Libellulidae. It is widespread in Madagascar, where it has been observed in a variety of habitats, including rice paddies, ponds and swamps.

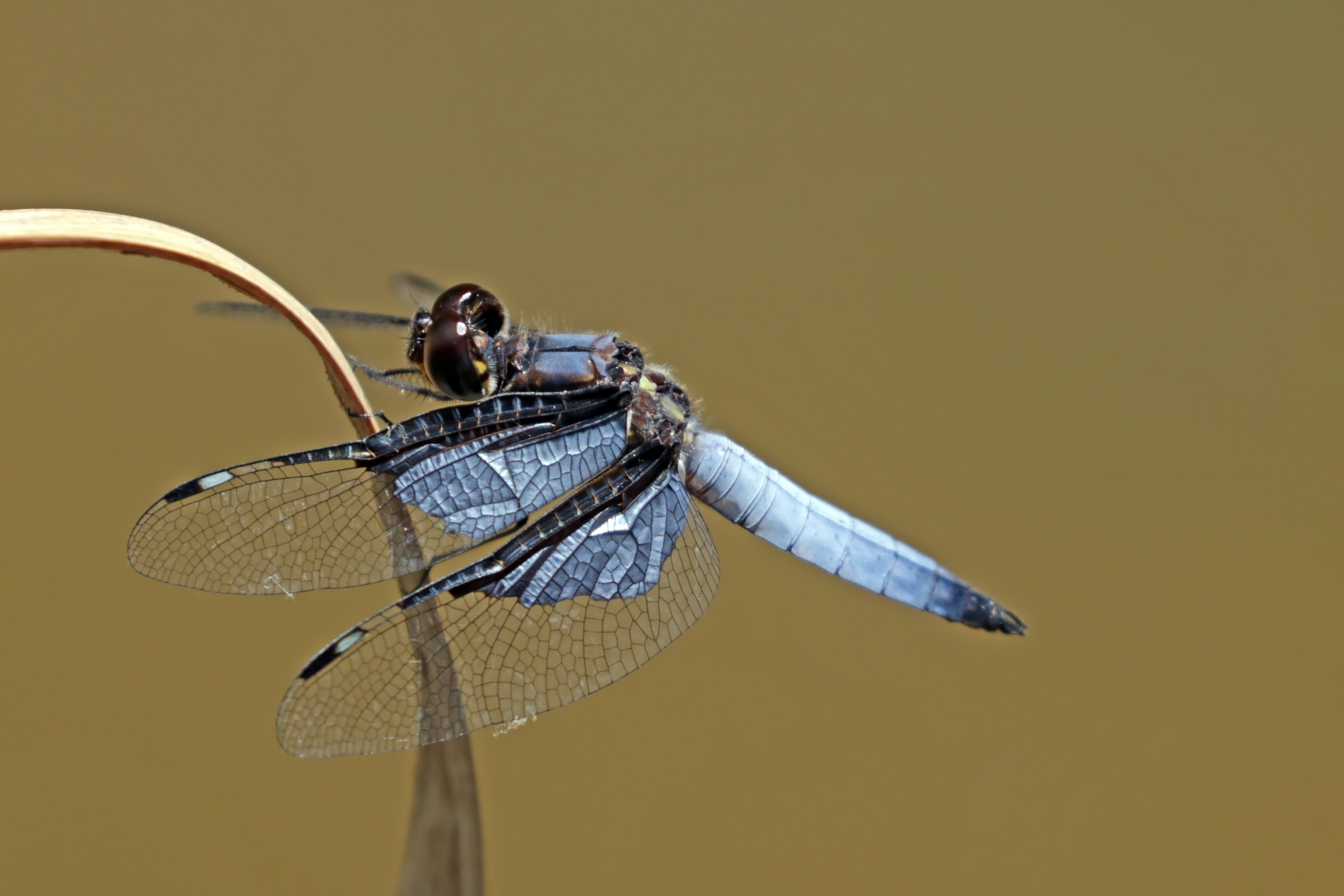

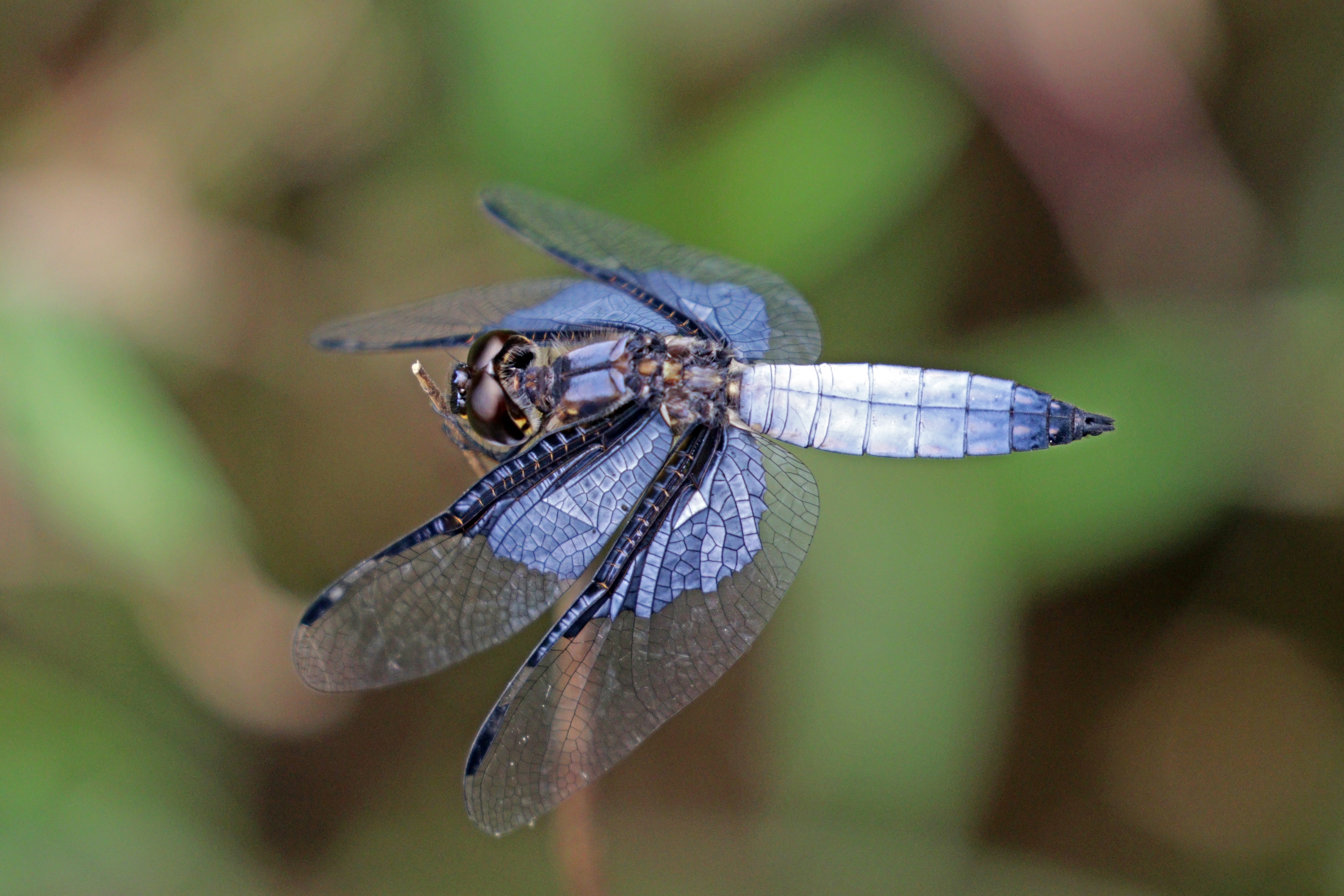
