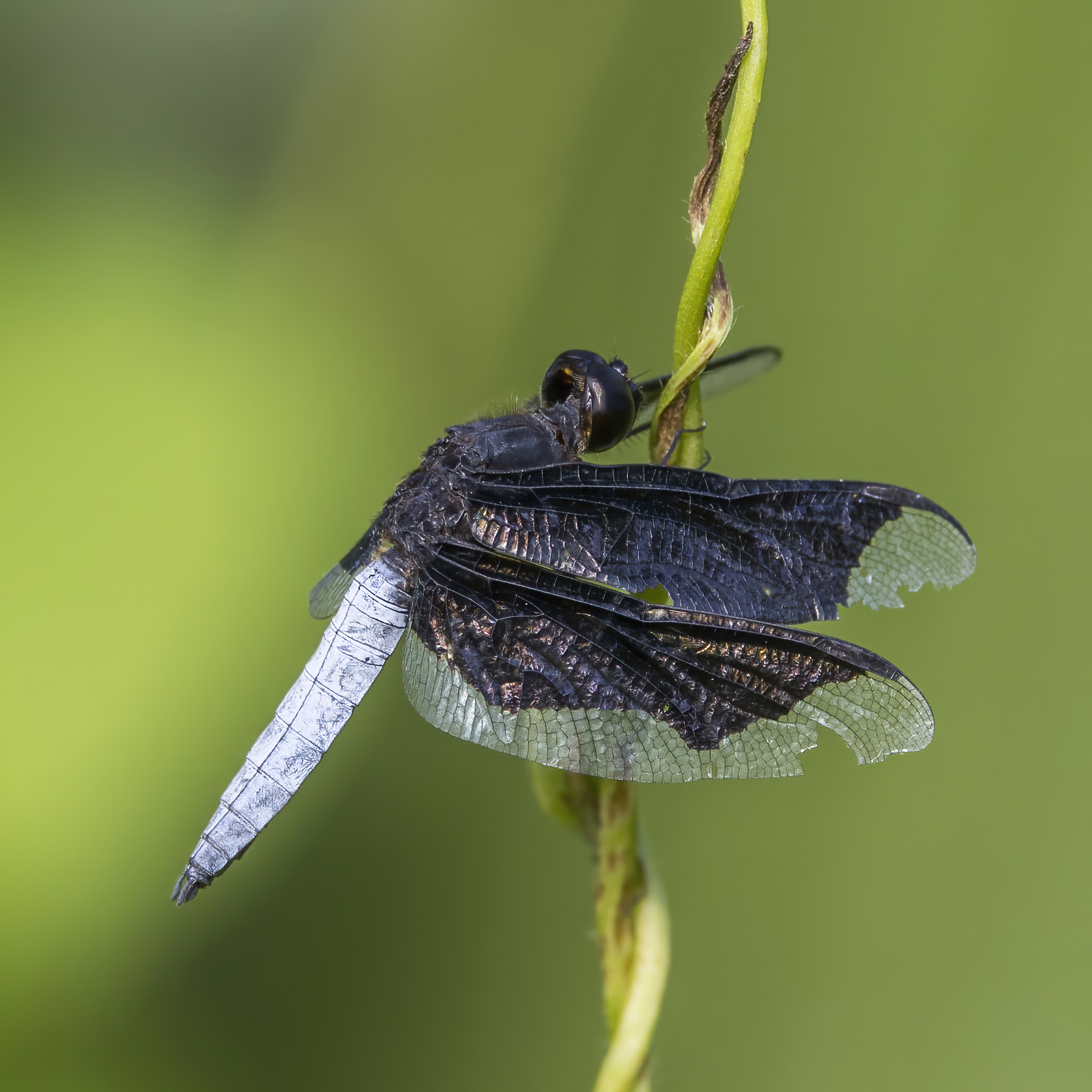
- Male, São Tomé and Príncipe
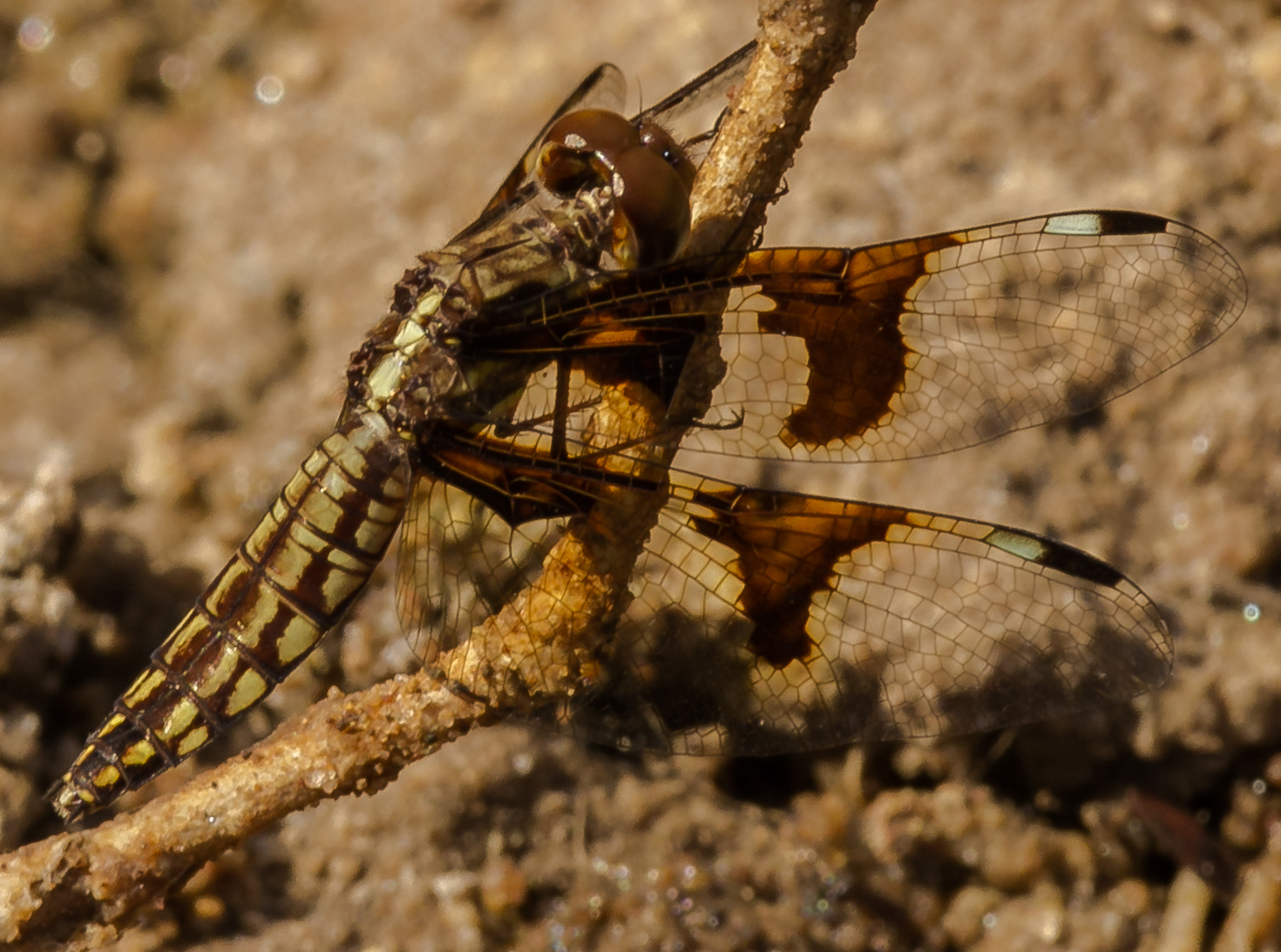
- Female

Conservation status
- Least Concern (IUCN 3.1)

Scientific classification
- Kingdom: Animalia
- Phylum: Arthropoda
- Class: Insecta
- Order: Odonata
- Infraorder: Anisoptera
- Family: Libellulidae
- Genus: Palpopleura
- Species: P. lucia

Binomial name
- Palpopleura lucia (Drury, 1773)

= Palpopleura lucia =

Species of dragonfly

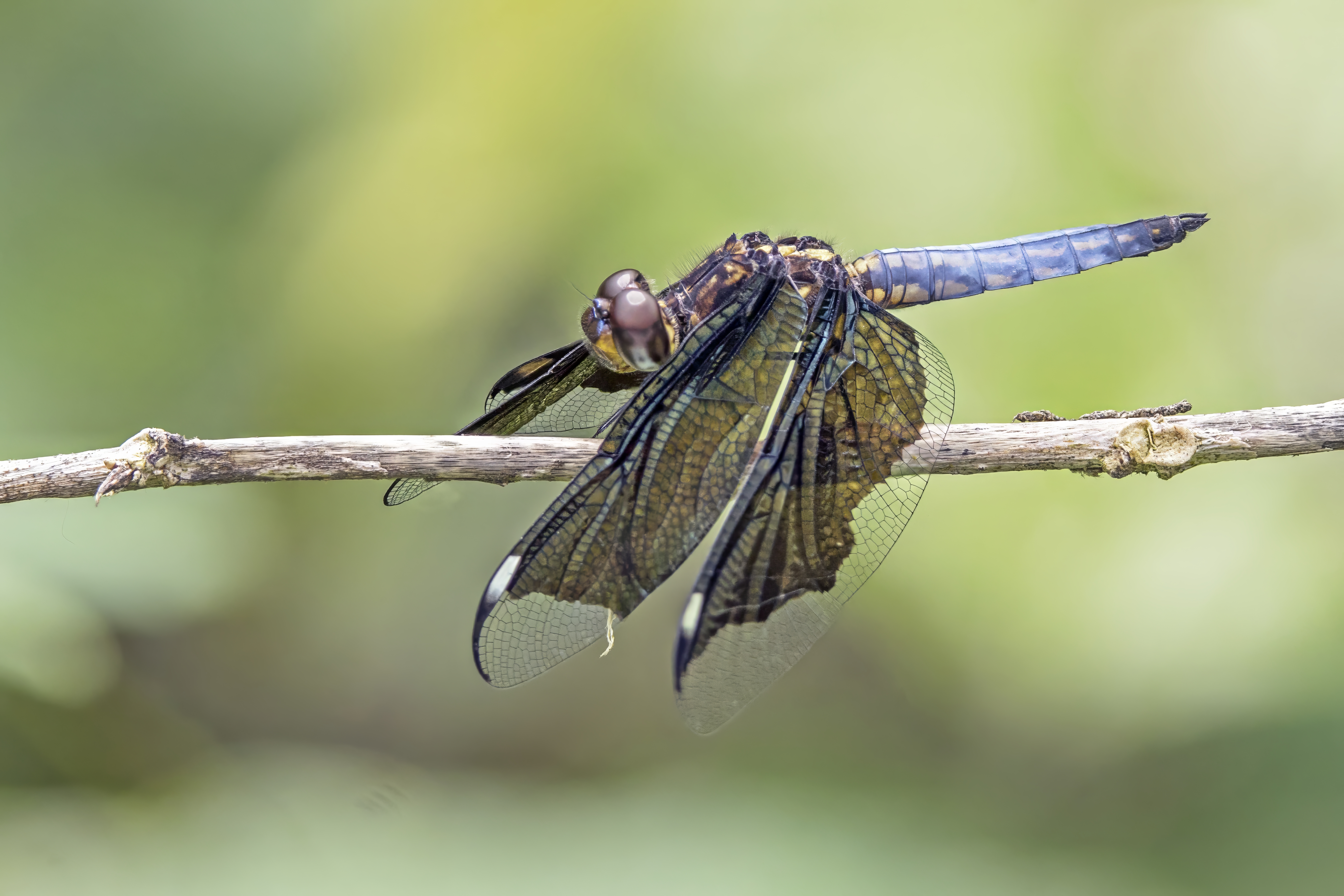
immature male, Ghana

Palpopleura lucia, the Lucia widow, is a species of dragonfly in the family Libellulidae. It is found in Angola, Benin, Botswana, Burkina Faso, Cameroon, Central African Republic, Chad, Comoros, the Democratic Republic of the Congo, Ivory Coast, Equatorial Guinea, Ethiopia, Gabon, Gambia, Ghana, Guinea, Kenya, Liberia, Madagascar, Malawi, Mozambique, Namibia, Nigeria, São Tomé and Príncipe, Sierra Leone, Somalia, South Africa, Sudan, Tanzania, Togo, Uganda, Zambia, Zimbabwe, and possibly Burundi. Its natural habitats are subtropical or tropical moist lowland forests, subtropical or tropical dry shrubland, rivers, intermittent rivers, shrub-dominated wetlands, swamps, freshwater lakes, intermittent freshwater lakes, freshwater marshes, intermittent freshwater marshes, and freshwater springs.
