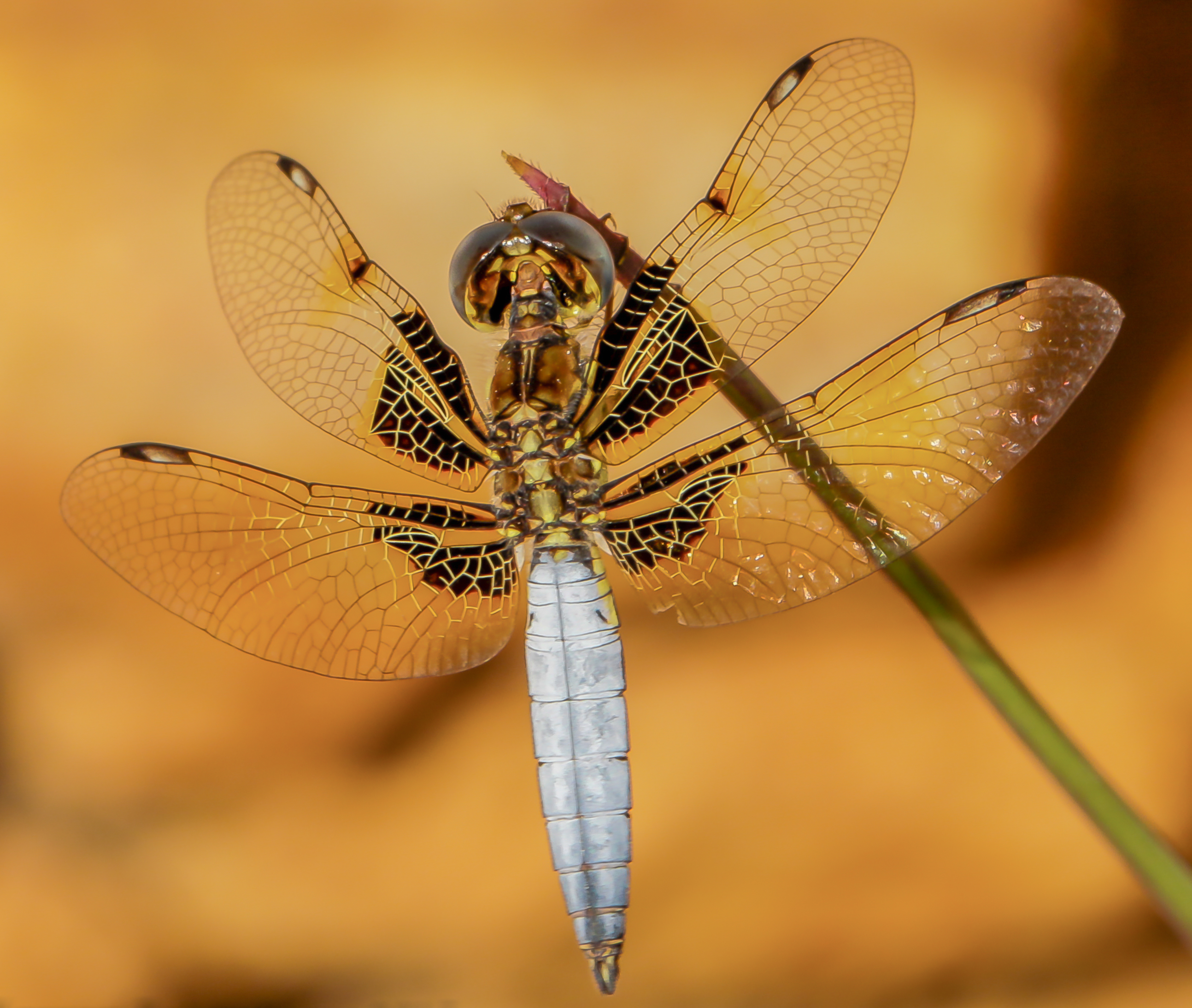

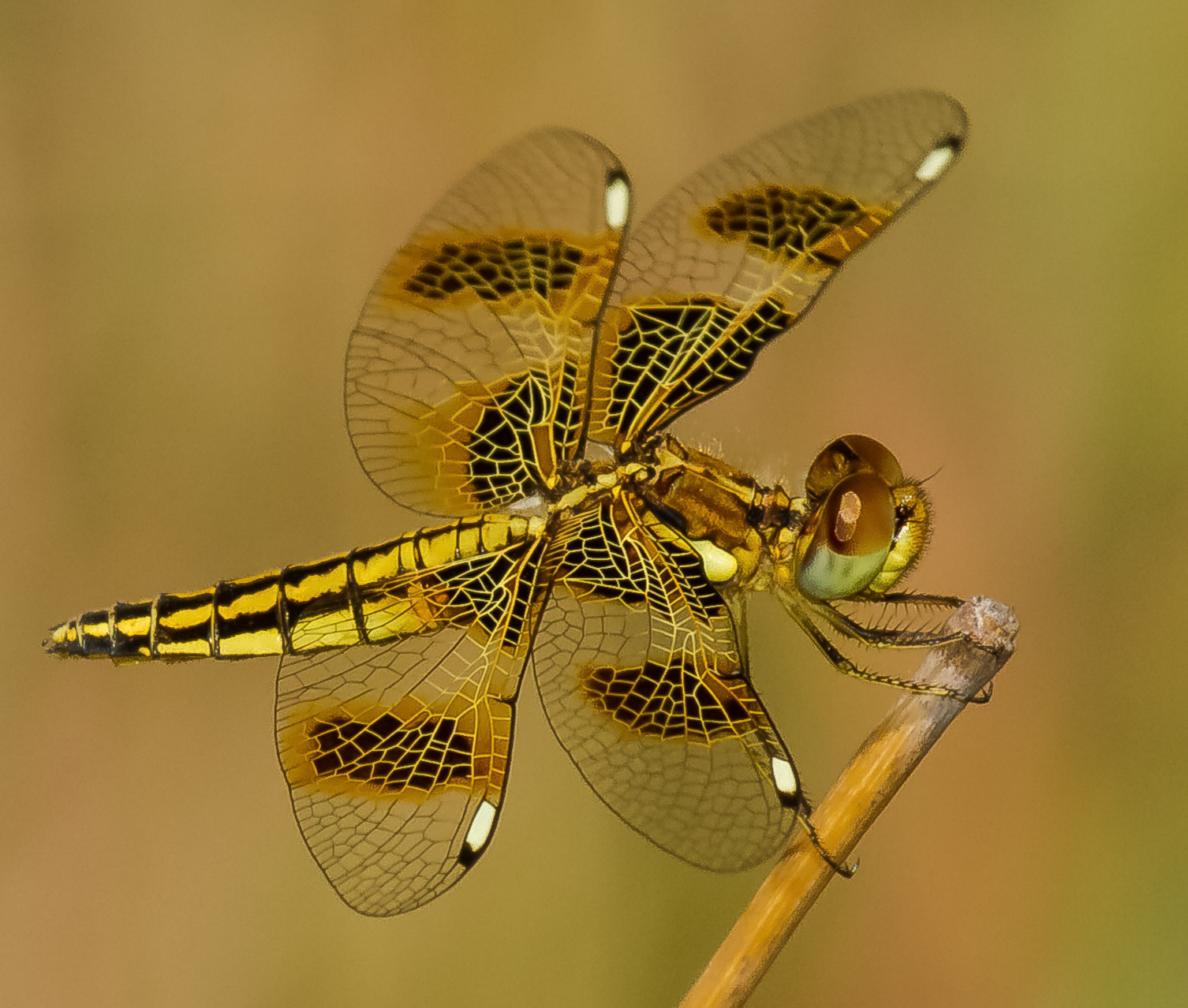
- P. jucunda, male and female

Scientific classification
- Kingdom: Animalia
- Phylum: Arthropoda
- Class: Insecta
- Order: Odonata
- Infraorder: Anisoptera
- Family: Libellulidae
- Subfamily: Palpopleurinae
- Genus: Palpopleura; Rambur, 1842

= Palpopleura =

Genus of dragonflies

Palpopleura is a genus of dragonflies in the family Libellulidae. Five species are native to sub-Saharan Africa, one ranges widely in southern Asia, and one is a widespread endemic to Madagascar.

== Species ==
The genus contains the following species:

Male	Female	Scientific name	Common name	Distribution
		Palpopleura albifrons Legrand, 1979	Pale-faced widow	Gabon
		Palpopleura deceptor (Calvert, 1899)	Deceptive widow	Benin, Botswana, Burkina Faso, Cameroon, Chad, the Democratic Republic of the Congo, Ivory Coast, Ethiopia, Gambia, Ghana, Guinea, Kenya, Malawi, Mozambique, Namibia, Niger, Nigeria, Sierra Leone, Somalia, South Africa, Sudan, Tanzania, Togo, Uganda, Zambia, Zimbabwe, and possibly Burundi.
		Palpopleura jucunda Rambur, 1842	Yellow-veined widow	Angola, Botswana, the DRC, Ivory Coast, Ethiopia, Kenya, Malawi, Mozambique, Namibia, Nigeria, South Africa, Sudan, Tanzania, Uganda, Zambia, Zimbabwe, and possibly Burundi.
		Palpopleura lucia (Drury, 1773)	Lucia widow	Angola, Benin, Botswana, Burkina Faso, Cameroon, Central African Republic, Chad, Comoros, the Democratic Republic of the Congo, Ivory Coast, Equatorial Guinea, Ethiopia, Gabon, Gambia, Ghana, Guinea, Kenya, Liberia, Madagascar, Malawi, Mozambique, Namibia, Nigeria, São Tomé and Príncipe, Sierra Leone, Somalia, South Africa, Sudan, Tanzania, Togo, Uganda, Zambia, Zimbabwe
		Palpopleura portia (Drury, 1773)	Portia widow	Angola, Botswana, Burkina Faso, Central African Republic, the Democratic Republic of the Congo, Ivory Coast, Equatorial Guinea, Ethiopia, Gambia, Kenya, Madagascar, Malawi, Mozambique, Namibia, Nigeria, Senegal, Somalia, South Africa, Sudan, Tanzania, Togo, Uganda, Zambia, Zimbabwe
		Palpopleura sexmaculata (Fabricius, 1787)	Asian widow	South, East and Southeast Asia
		Palpopleura vestita Rambur, 1842	Silver widow	Madagascar
